= Sunnyhills =

- Suburb
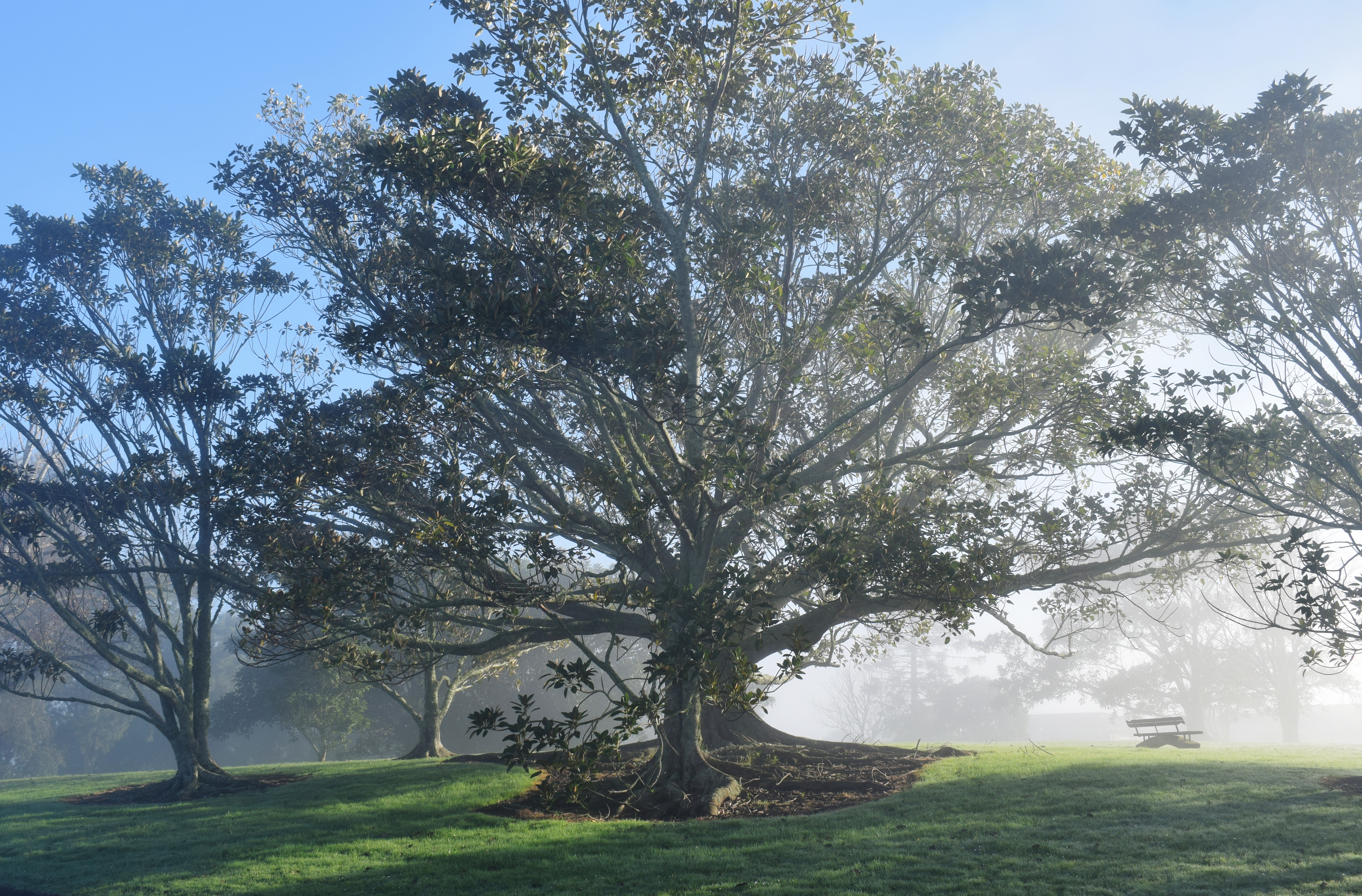
- Moreton Bay fig tree in a public park in Sunnyhills on a foggy morning
- Interactive map of Sunnyhills
- Coordinates: 36°54′16″S 174°52′58″E
- Country: New Zealand
- City: Auckland
- Local authority: Auckland Council
- Electoral ward: Howick ward
- Local board: Howick Local Board

Area
  - Land: 174 ha (430 acres)

Population (June 2025)
  - Total: 6,100
  - Density: 3,500/km^{2} (9,100/sq mi)

(Tāmaki River)	Farm Cove	Half Moon Bay
(Tāmaki River)	Sunnyhills	Highland Park
Pakuranga	Pakuranga Heights

Sunnyhills is a suburb of East Auckland, New Zealand, located on the eastern banks of the Tāmaki River near Pakuranga. Previously farmland within the Pakuranga Town District, suburban housing developed in the area in the mid-1960s.

== Geography ==
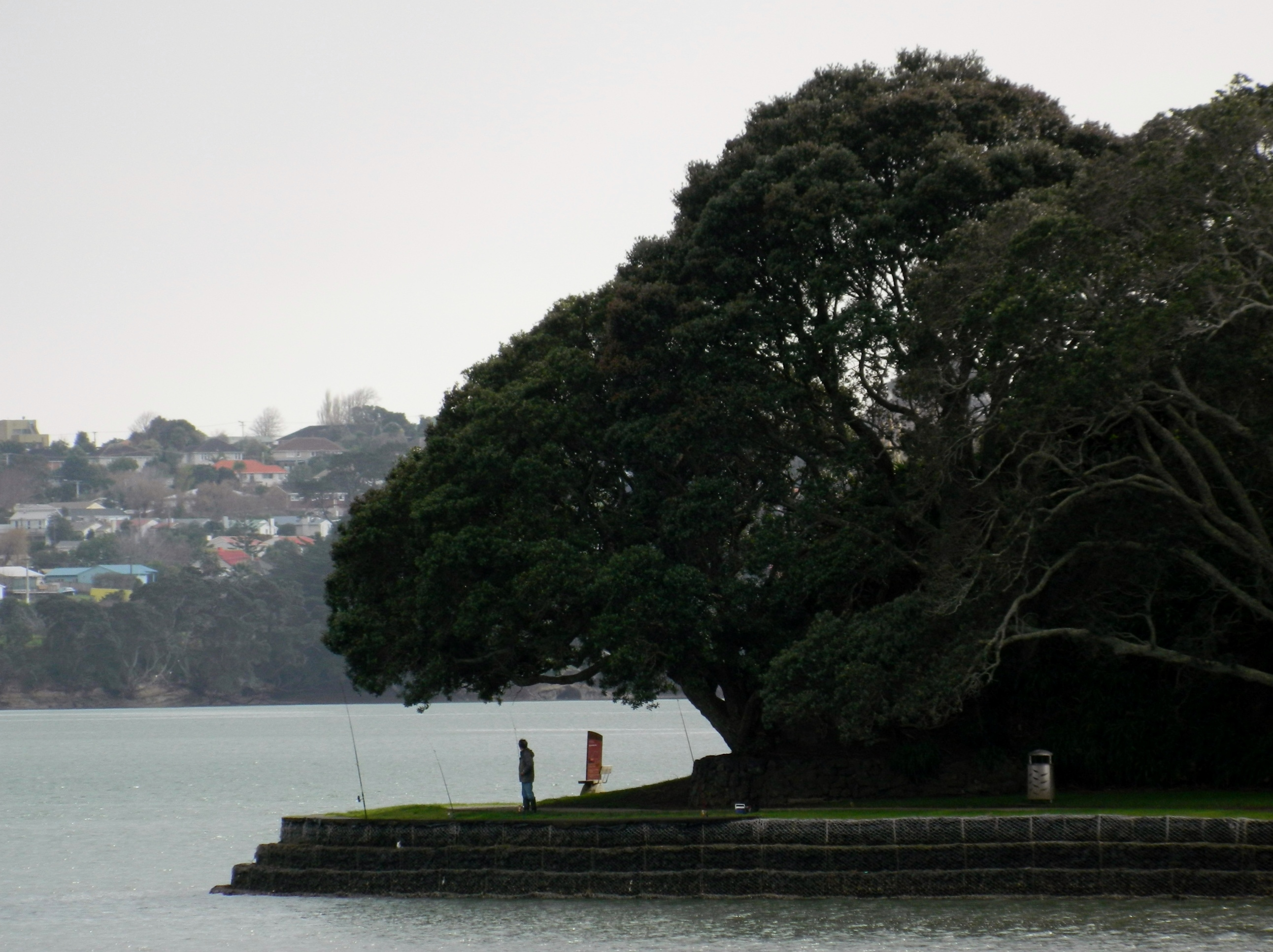
Sanctuary Point along the Sunnyhills walkway is a popular spot for fisherman

Sunnyhills is a suburb of East Auckland located on the eastern shores of the Tāmaki River, an estuarial drowned river valley. The shoreline along Sunnyhills at Sanctuary Point is notable for its deposits of white volcanic tephra at the base of the cliffs.

== History ==
The Sunnyhills area is part of the rohe of Ngāi Tai ki Tāmaki, who descend from the crew of the Tainui migratory waka, who visited the area around the year 1300. The mouth of the Tāmaki River was traditionally known as Te Wai ō Tāiki ("The Waters of Tāiki"), named after the Ngāi Tai ancestor Tāiki. Tāiki settled with his followers along the eastern shores of the Tāmaki River, alongside the descendants of Huiārangi of the early iwi Te Tini ō Maruiwi. Ngāi Tai created extensive cultivations along the eastern shores of the Tāmaki River. Ōhuiarangi / Pigeon Mountain was an important pā site for Ngāi Tai ki Tāmaki, named after ancestress Huiārangi, daughter of Tāmaki of Te Tini ō Maruiwi. The slopes of the mountain and surrounding areas were home to stonefield gardens, and the mountain was an important location for snaring kererū. In approximately the first half of the 18th century, Ngāriki, a rangatira of Ngāi Tai, built a fortified pā at Te Naupata (Musick Point), the headland at the end of the peninsula, called Te Waiārohia (a shortening of Te Waiārohia ō Ngāriki). The followers of Ngāriki also settled at the Ōhuiarangi pā.

During the Musket Wars in the 1820s, members of Ngāi Tai fled to the Waikato for temporary refuge. When English missionary William Thomas Fairburn visited the area in 1833, it was mostly unoccupied. In 1836, William Thomas Fairburn brokered a land sale between Tāmaki Māori chiefs covering the majority of modern-day South Auckland, East Auckland and the Pōhutukawa Coast. The sale was envisioned as a way to end hostilities in the area, but it is unclear what the chiefs understood or consented to. Māori continued to live in the area, unchanged by this sale. In 1854 when Fairburn's purchase was investigated by the New Zealand Land Commission, a Ngāi Tai reserve was created around the Wairoa River and Umupuia areas, and as a part of the agreement, members of Ngāi Tai agreed to leave their traditional settlements to the west.

=== European settlement ===
The Pakuranga area was sold by Government auction in 1843. In 1847, Howick was established as a defensive outpost for Auckland, by fencibles (retired British Army soldiers) and their families. By the latter 19th Century, the Pakuranga area had developed English countryside, dominated by poplar, oak and willow trees. Wheat fields were a major source of income, which were gradually replaced with dairy farms by the 1940s. By 1956, Pakuranga had grown in size enough that the Pakuranga County Town was established within Manukau County.

Pakuranga saw major growth from the 1950s, with new subdivisions developed in the area. Sunnyhills (also referred to as Sunny Hills or Sunnyhill) was one of these developments, which was constructed in the mid-1960s. Sunnyhills was lauded for the individual designs of houses, and for modern features such as underground telephone and power cables. In October 1970, Sunnyhills Primary School was opened.

== Demographics ==
Sunnyhills covers 1.74 km^{2} (0.67 sq mi) and had an estimated population of 6,100 as of June 2025, with a population density of 3,506 people per km^{2}.

Historical population
Year	Pop.	±% p.a.
2006	6,384	—
2013	5,508	−2.09%
2018	5,670	+0.58%
2023	5,664	−0.02%
The 2006 population is for a larger area of 2.50 km^{2}. Source:

Sunnyhills had a population of 5,664 in the 2023 New Zealand census, a decrease of 6 people (−0.1%) since the 2018 census, and an increase of 156 people (2.8%) since the 2013 census. There were 2,697 males, 2,955 females and 9 people of other genders in 1,932 dwellings. 2.3% of people identified as LGBTIQ+. The median age was 41.7 years (compared with 38.1 years nationally). There were 987 people (17.4%) aged under 15 years, 1,014 (17.9%) aged 15 to 29, 2,523 (44.5%) aged 30 to 64, and 1,143 (20.2%) aged 65 or older.

People could identify as more than one ethnicity. The results were 52.0% European (Pākehā); 7.0% Māori; 4.8% Pasifika; 43.1% Asian; 1.9% Middle Eastern, Latin American and African New Zealanders (MELAA); and 2.3% other, which includes people giving their ethnicity as "New Zealander". English was spoken by 90.8%, Māori language by 1.1%, Samoan by 1.0%, and other languages by 36.5%. No language could be spoken by 1.5% (e.g. too young to talk). New Zealand Sign Language was known by 0.2%. The percentage of people born overseas was 48.5, compared with 28.8% nationally.

Religious affiliations were 32.6% Christian, 3.6% Hindu, 1.6% Islam, 0.4% Māori religious beliefs, 3.2% Buddhist, 0.3% New Age, 0.2% Jewish, and 2.5% other religions. People who answered that they had no religion were 49.9%, and 5.8% of people did not answer the census question.

Of those at least 15 years old, 1,587 (33.9%) people had a bachelor's or higher degree, 1,923 (41.1%) had a post-high school certificate or diploma, and 1,164 (24.9%) people exclusively held high school qualifications. The median income was $42,800, compared with $41,500 nationally. 681 people (14.6%) earned over $100,000 compared to 12.1% nationally. The employment status of those at least 15 was that 2,244 (48.0%) people were employed full-time, 627 (13.4%) were part-time, and 117 (2.5%) were unemployed.

Individual statistical areas
Name	Area (km^{2})	Population	Density (per km^{2})	Dwellings	Median age	Median income
Sunnyhills West	0.87	2,202	2,531	720	42.3 years	$48,800
Sunnyhills East	0.87	3,465	3,983	1,212	41.4 years	$38,800
New Zealand					38.1 years	$41,500

== Education ==
Sunnyhills Primary School is a coeducational full primary school (years 1–6) with a roll of 480 as of July 2025. St Mark's Catholic School is a state-integrated coeducational contributing primary school (years 1–6) with a roll of 207 as of July 2025. Other schools in the Pakuranga area close to Sunnyhills are: Riverina Primary School, Wakaaranga Primary School, Anchorage Park Primary School, Farm Cove Intermediate, Pakuranga Intermediate, Saint Kentigern College, Pakuranga College and Edgewater College.

== Bibliography ==
- La Roche, Alan (2011). Grey's Folly: A History of Howick, Pakuranga, Bucklands-Eastern Beaches, East Tamaki, Whitford, Beachlands and Maraetai. Auckland: Tui Vale Productions. ISBN 978-0-473-18547-3. OCLC 1135039710. Wikidata Q118286377.
