= Botany Downs =

- Suburb
- Interactive map of Botany Downs
- Coordinates: 36.909528°S 174.917454°E
- Country: New Zealand
- City: Auckland
- Local authority: Auckland Council
- Electoral ward: Howick ward
- Local board: Howick Local Board

Area
  - Land: 170 ha (420 acres)

Population (June 2025)
  - Total: 6,210
  - Density: 3,700/km^{2} (9,500/sq mi)

Highland Park	Howick	Howick
Pakuranga Heights	Botany Downs	Somerville
Golflands	Northpark	Northpark

Botany Downs is an eastern suburb of the city of Auckland, New Zealand. This residential area previously formed part of the East Tāmaki area. In terms of local-body administration, the suburb lies in the Howick ward, one of the thirteen administrative divisions of the Auckland Council.

== Geography ==
Botany Downs is located in the central peninsula of East Auckland, between the Tāmaki River and Tāmaki Strait of the Hauraki Gulf. The suburb is south of Howick. Botany Creek runs west through the suburb to meet the Pakuranga Creek. The soil around Howick is primarily clay and sandstone. Botany Road is a major arterial road that runs north-south through Botany Downs, which intersects with Cascades Road to the south of the suburb.

== History ==
=== Early history ===
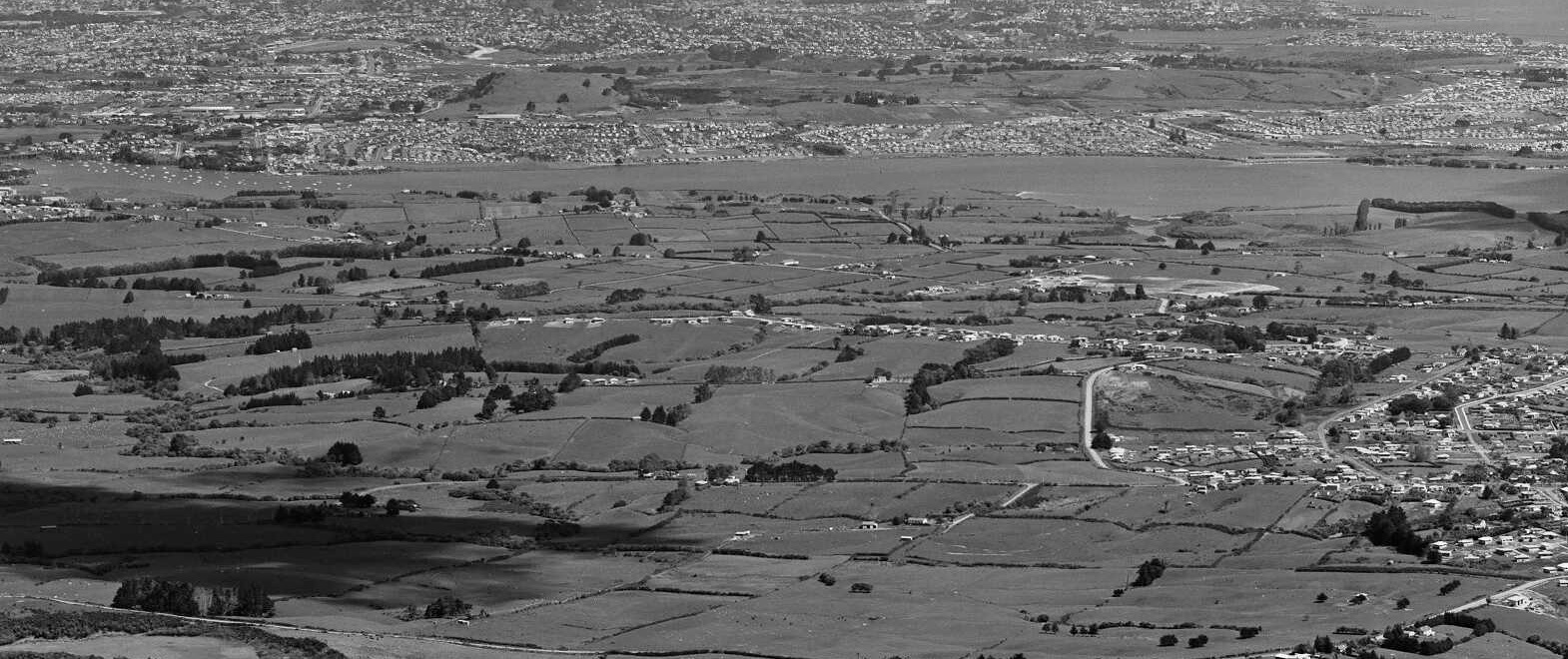
Aerial view of Botany Downs in 1959, when the area was farmland

The Botany Downs area is part of the rohe of Ngāi Tai ki Tāmaki, who descend from the crew of the Tainui migratory waka, who visited the area around the year 1300. Ōwairoa is the traditional name used to describe the swampy inland areas away from the coast. The wider area was extensively cultivated, but as the area was relatively exposed, two fortified pā were constructed: Paparoa Pā at the south-eastern end of Waipaparoa / Howick Beach, and Tūwakamana Pā above Cockle Bay. During the Musket Wars in the 1820s, Ngāi Tai Ki Tāmaki sought temporary refuge in the Waikato. When English missionary William Thomas Fairburn visited the area in 1833, it was mostly unoccupied.

In 1836, William Thomas Fairburn brokered a land sale between Tāmaki Māori chiefs covering the majority of modern-day South Auckland, East Auckland and the Pōhutukawa Coast. The sale was envisioned as a way to end hostilities in the area, but it is unclear what the chiefs understood or consented to. Māori continued to live in the area, unchanged by this sale. In 1854 when Fairburn's purchase was investigated by the New Zealand Land Commission, a Ngāi Tai reserve was created around the Wairoa River and Umupuia areas, and as a part of the agreement, members of Ngāi Tai agreed to leave their traditional settlements to the west.

In 1847, Howick was established as a defensive outpost for Auckland, by fencibles (retired British Army soldiers) and their families.

=== Development of the suburb ===
Botany Downs was the name of a farm leased by Vern Carr from James Wilson. Carr named the farm after Botany Road. The "Downs" in the name was not a reference to the geography of the area, instead a reference to the economics of farming in the 1950s and 1960s. The area was developed into suburban housing in the mid-1970s, and Botany Downs Primary School opened in 1975. The school decided to name itself after Carr's former farm, a fact that displeased Carr.

In 1984, the Howick Club, a private social club, opened in Botany Downs, and in 1989 a new bridge on Botany Road was constructed over the Botany Creek. In the year 2000, a 153 unit condominium development called Sacramento was constructed in Botany Downs. The development was part of the leaky homes crisis, and led to a multi-million dollar lawsuit by the occupants.

== Demographics ==
Botany Downs covers 1.70 km^{2} (0.66 sq mi) and had an estimated population of 6,210 as of June 2025, with a population density of 3,653 people per km^{2}.

Historical population
Year	Pop.	±% p.a.
2006	4,800	—
2013	5,385	+1.66%
2018	5,706	+1.16%
2023	5,772	+0.23%
The 2006 population is for a smaller area of 1.49 km^{2}. Source:

Botany Downs had a population of 5,772 in the 2023 New Zealand census, an increase of 66 people (1.2%) since the 2018 census, and an increase of 387 people (7.2%) since the 2013 census. There were 2,835 males, 2,919 females and 18 people of other genders in 1,899 dwellings. 3.2% of people identified as LGBTIQ+. The median age was 39.8 years (compared with 38.1 years nationally). There were 1,074 people (18.6%) aged under 15 years, 966 (16.7%) aged 15 to 29, 2,787 (48.3%) aged 30 to 64, and 942 (16.3%) aged 65 or older.

People could identify as more than one ethnicity. The results were 52.1% European (Pākehā); 6.0% Māori; 6.5% Pasifika; 39.9% Asian; 2.3% Middle Eastern, Latin American and African New Zealanders (MELAA); and 4.0% other, which includes people giving their ethnicity as "New Zealander". English was spoken by 89.9%, Māori language by 0.6%, Samoan by 1.6%, and other languages by 37.5%. No language could be spoken by 1.8% (e.g. too young to talk). New Zealand Sign Language was known by 0.1%. The percentage of people born overseas was 52.3, compared with 28.8% nationally.

Religious affiliations were 35.2% Christian, 3.0% Hindu, 1.5% Islam, 0.2% Māori religious beliefs, 2.3% Buddhist, 0.1% New Age, 0.1% Jewish, and 2.5% other religions. People who answered that they had no religion were 48.5%, and 6.9% of people did not answer the census question.

Of those at least 15 years old, 1,407 (29.9%) people had a bachelor's or higher degree, 2,025 (43.1%) had a post-high school certificate or diploma, and 1,269 (27.0%) people exclusively held high school qualifications. The median income was $45,900, compared with $41,500 nationally. 642 people (13.7%) earned over $100,000 compared to 12.1% nationally. The employment status of those at least 15 was that 2,502 (53.3%) people were employed full-time, 600 (12.8%) were part-time, and 108 (2.3%) were unemployed.

Individual statistical areas
Name	Area (km^{2})	Population	Density (per km^{2})	Dwellings	Median age	Median income
Botany Downs West	1.03	3,492	3,390	1,104	39.8 years	$45,300
Botany Downs East	0.68	2,283	3,357	795	39.7 years	$46,800
New Zealand					38.1 years	$41,500

== Education ==
Botany Downs School is a contributing primary school (years 1–6) with a roll of 600. Elim Christian College is a state-integrated Christian composite school (years 1–13) with a roll of 1,005. All these schools are coeducational. Rolls are as of October 2025. The main secondary schools for the area are Botany Downs Secondary College and Howick College.

== Bibliography ==
- La Roche, Alan (2011). Grey's Folly: A History of Howick, Pakuranga, Bucklands-Eastern Beaches, East Tamaki, Whitford, Beachlands and Maraetai. Auckland: Tui Vale Productions. ISBN 978-0-473-18547-3. OCLC 1135039710. Wikidata Q118286377.
