= Waipaparoa / Howick Beach =

Beach in New Zealand

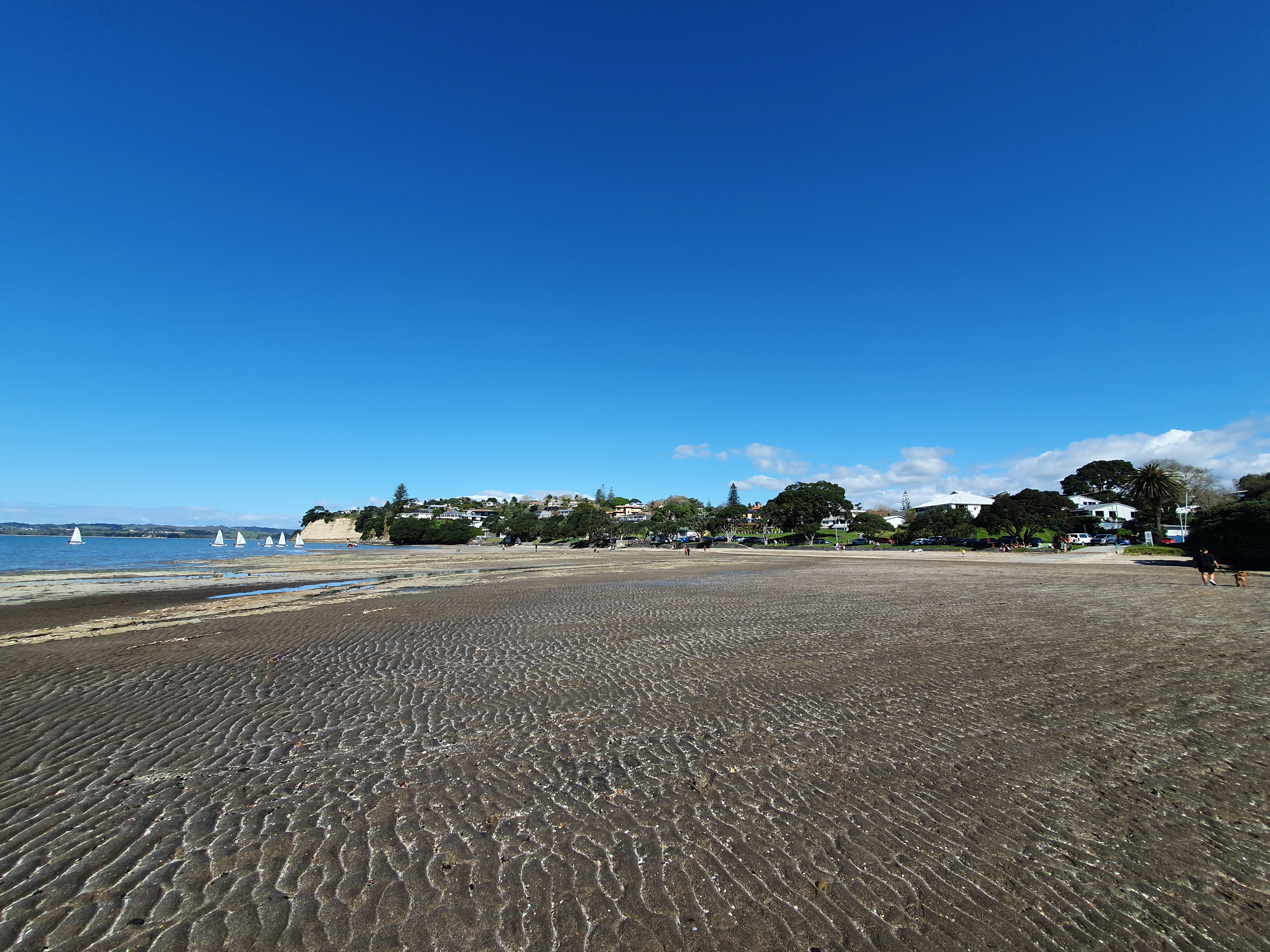
- View of Waipaparoa / Howick Beach at low tide, looking east

- Location within the Auckland Region
- Location: Auckland Region, New Zealand
- Coordinates: 36.892°S 174.942°E
- Ocean/sea sources: Hauraki Gulf

Waipaparoa / Howick Beach is a beach in the Auckland Region of New Zealand's North Island. It is located in Howick.

== Description ==
Waipaparoa / Howick Beach is located in East Auckland in Howick, adjacent to Mellons Bay in the west and Cockle Bay in the east. Waipaparoa / Howick Beach looks out towards the Tāmaki Strait, Waiheke Island, Motukaraka Island and Beachlands.

== History ==
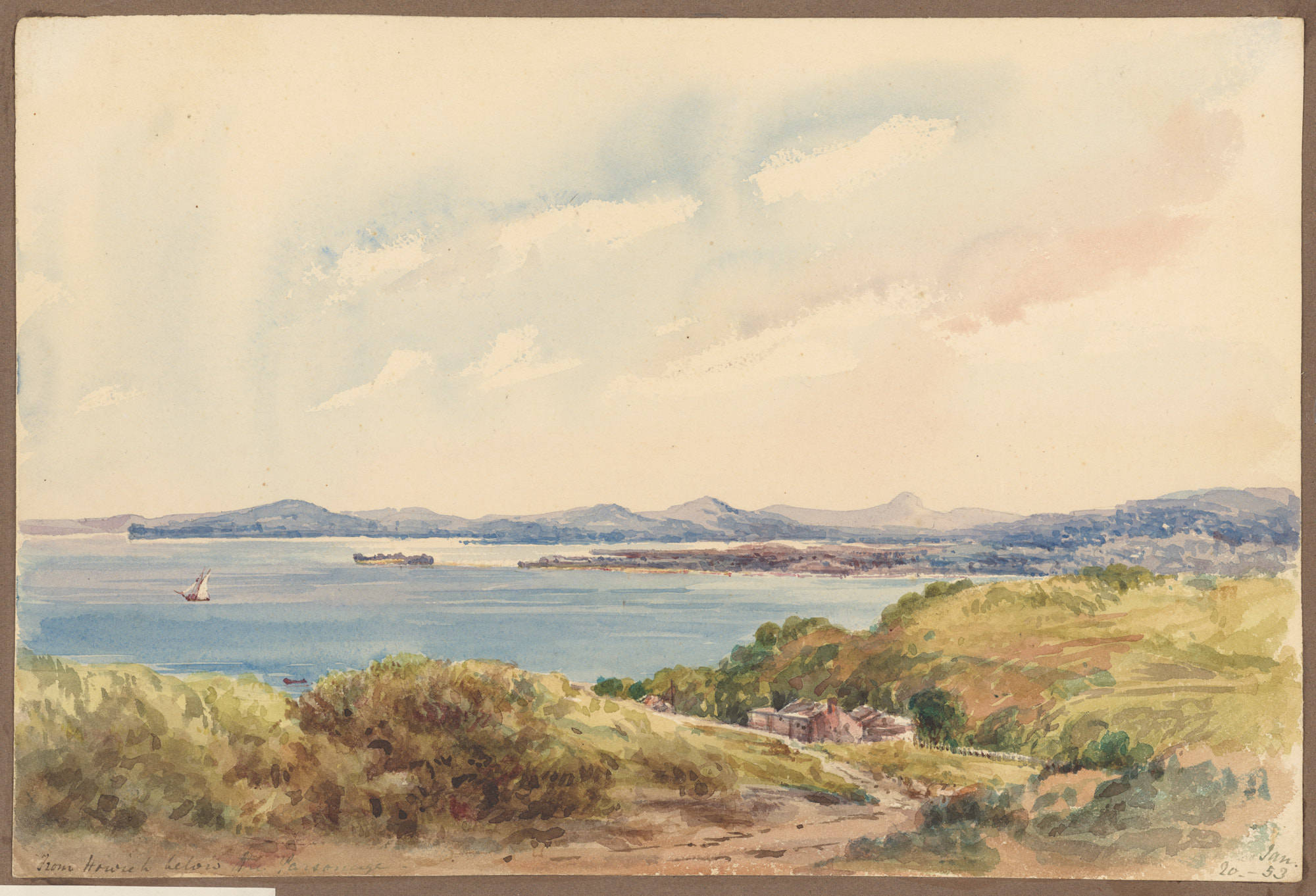
Watercolour by Caroline Harriet Abraham, showing Waipaparoa / Howick Beach in 1853

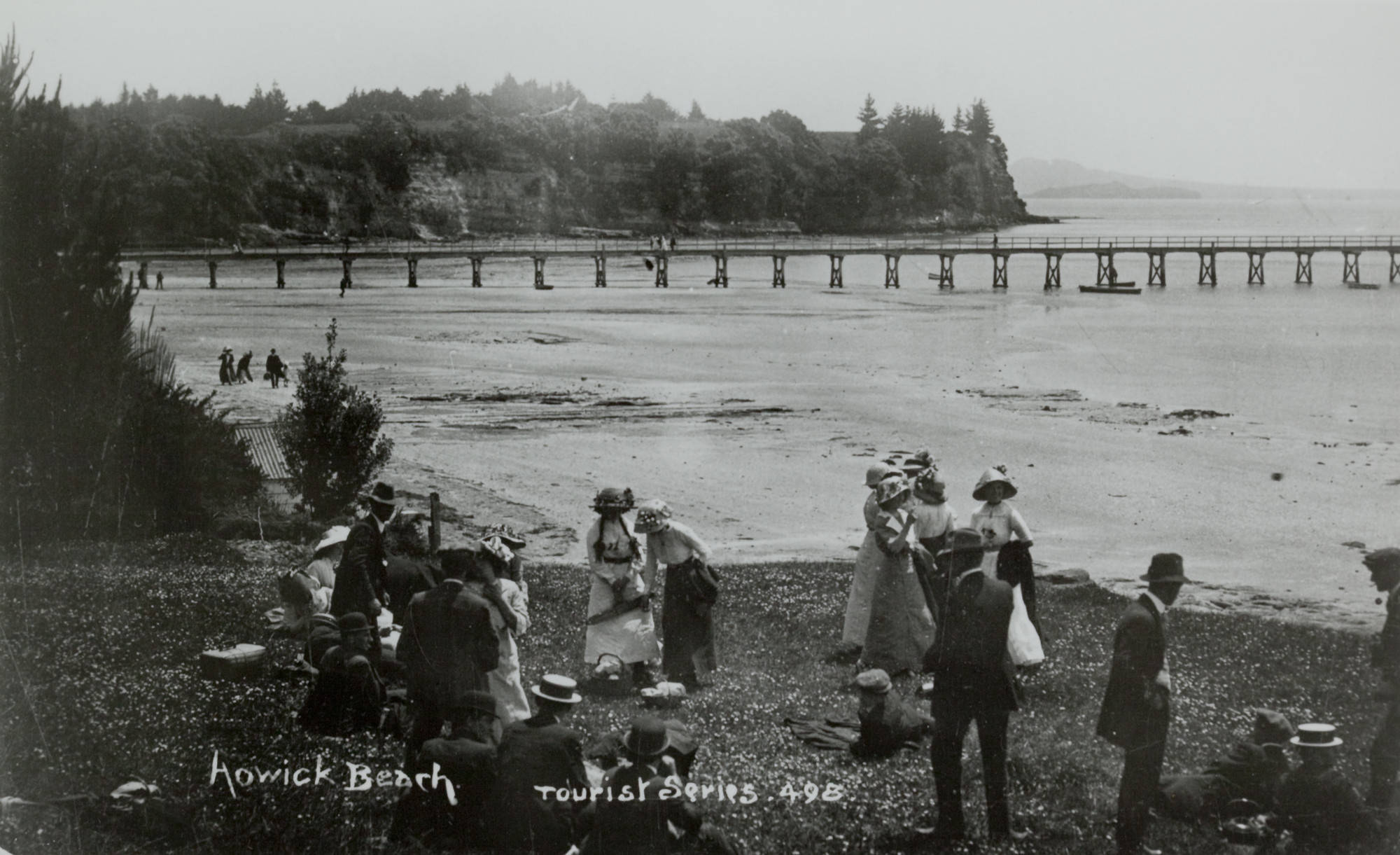
Holidaymakers at Howick Beach circa 1915, with the Howick Wharf in the background

The Tāmaki Strait was visited by the Tainui migratory waka around the year 1300, and members of the crew settled around East Auckland and the Pōhutukawa Coast. These were the ancestors of the modern mana whenua of the area, Ngāi Tai ki Tāmaki. The traditional names for the beach and surrounding bay are Paparoa and Waipaparoa, with Waipaparoa referring to the wider bay between modern-day Howick and Beachlands, including the Turanga Creek. The Howick area was extensively cultivated, but as the area was relatively exposed, two fortified pā were constructed: Paparoa Pā at the south-eastern end of Waipaparoa / Howick Beach, and Tūwakamana Pā above Cockle Bay. In addition to agriculture, the Waipaparoa / Howick Beach area was known for pioke (shortspine spurdog sharks), which were caught in the near-by estuaries and dried at the beach. In the 1600s, the warrior Kāwharu attacked and raised Paparoa Pā, without taking occupation of the lands. While the wider area was still cultivated, the site of Paparoa Pā became a wāhi tapu (sacred and restricted) site to Ngāi Tai.

In 1836, English Missionary William Thomas Fairburn brokered a land sale between Tāmaki Māori chiefs, Pōtatau Te Wherowhero and Turia of Ngāti Te Rau, covering the majority of modern-day South Auckland, East Auckland and the Pōhutukawa Coast. The sale was envisioned as a way to end hostilities in the area, but it is unclear what the chiefs understood or consented to. Māori continued to live in the area, unchanged by this sale. Fairburn's Purchase was investigated by the New Zealand Land Commission found to be excessive and reduced in size. The disallowed parts of his purchase were not returned to Ngāi Tai, however in 1854 a reserve was created for Ngāi Tai around the Wairoa River and Umupuia. As a part of this arrangement, Ngāi Tai agreed not to settle elsewhere in the region, which included Waipaparoa / Howick Beach.

In 1847, Howick township was established as a defensive outpost for Auckland, by fencibles (retired British Army soldiers) and their families. Many of the ships transporting the fencibles arrived at Waipaparoa / Howick Beach, including the Minerva and Sir Robert Sale. Ships used to offload passengers directly onto the sandstone reef, and since the early colonial era, the beach developed a reputation as being dangerous, due to numerous shipwrecks and drownings. In 1854, wharf was constructed on the beach, however was only usable at high tide. Many ferries preferred to disembark passengers at the Shelly Park sandspit, despite being further away from Howick. In 1896, a new 240 metre-long wharf was constructed at Waipaparoa / Howick Beach.

At the turn of the 20th century, the beach had started to become a popular location for excursions and holidays. In 1905, bathing sheds were erected at the beach, and in the 1920s the northern area of the beach was subdivided for housing.

During World War II, an anti-tank trench was dug at the eastern end of the beach, which over time primarily used by children as a changing area. The trench was covered up a few years after construction, due to little blue penguins getting trapped inside. From 1956, the Howick Volunteer Coastguard has patrolled the beach.

== Amenities ==
The beach is a popular location for picnics and swimming, and has several boat ramps.

== Bibliography ==
- La Roche, Alan (2011). Grey's Folly: A History of Howick, Pakuranga, Bucklands-Eastern Beaches, East Tamaki, Whitford, Beachlands and Maraetai. Auckland: Tui Vale Productions. ISBN 978-0-473-18547-3. OCLC 1135039710. Wikidata Q118286377.
