= Half Moon Bay, Auckland =

Half Moon Bay
- Suburb
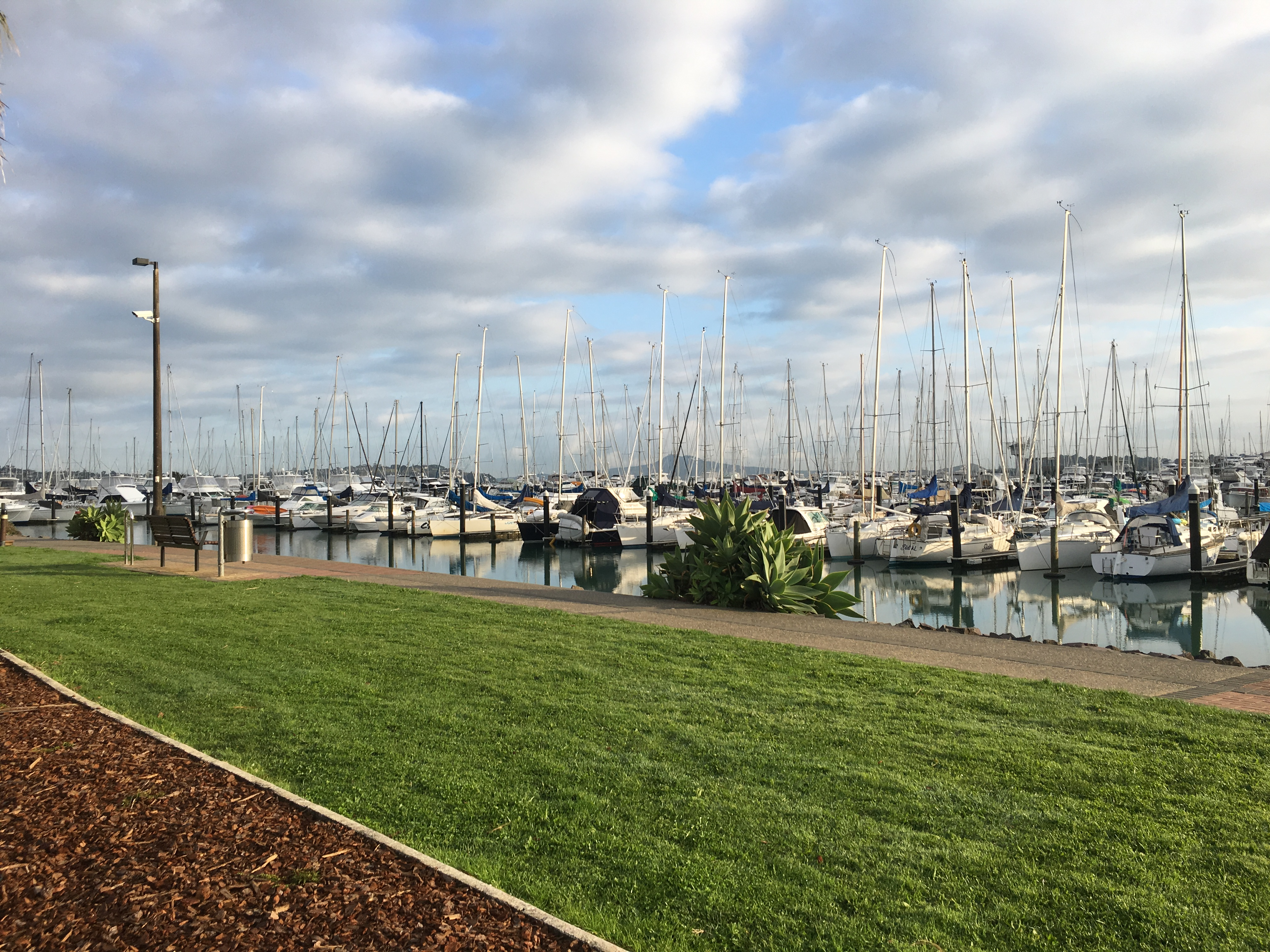
- Marina at Half Moon Bay, September 2018
- Interactive map of Half Moon Bay
- Coordinates: 36°53′05″S 174°53′55″E
- Country: New Zealand
- City: Auckland
- Local authority: Auckland Council
- Electoral ward: Howick ward
- Local board: Howick Local Board
- Established: 1969

Area
  - Land: 262 ha (650 acres)

Population (June 2025)
  - Total: 8,650
  - Density: 3,300/km^{2} (8,550/sq mi)
- Postcode: 2012
- Ferry terminals: Half Moon Bay Ferry Terminal
- Airports: None

(Tāmaki River)	(Tāmaki River)	Bucklands Beach
(Tāmaki River)	Half Moon Bay	Mellons Bay
Farm Cove	Pakuranga Heights	Howick, Highland Park

Half Moon Bay, is a suburb of East Auckland, New Zealand, lying immediately south of Bucklands Beach. It is home to the Half Moon Bay Marina, where over 500 boats berth. It is located on the Tāmaki River in the Hauraki Gulf.

== Geography ==
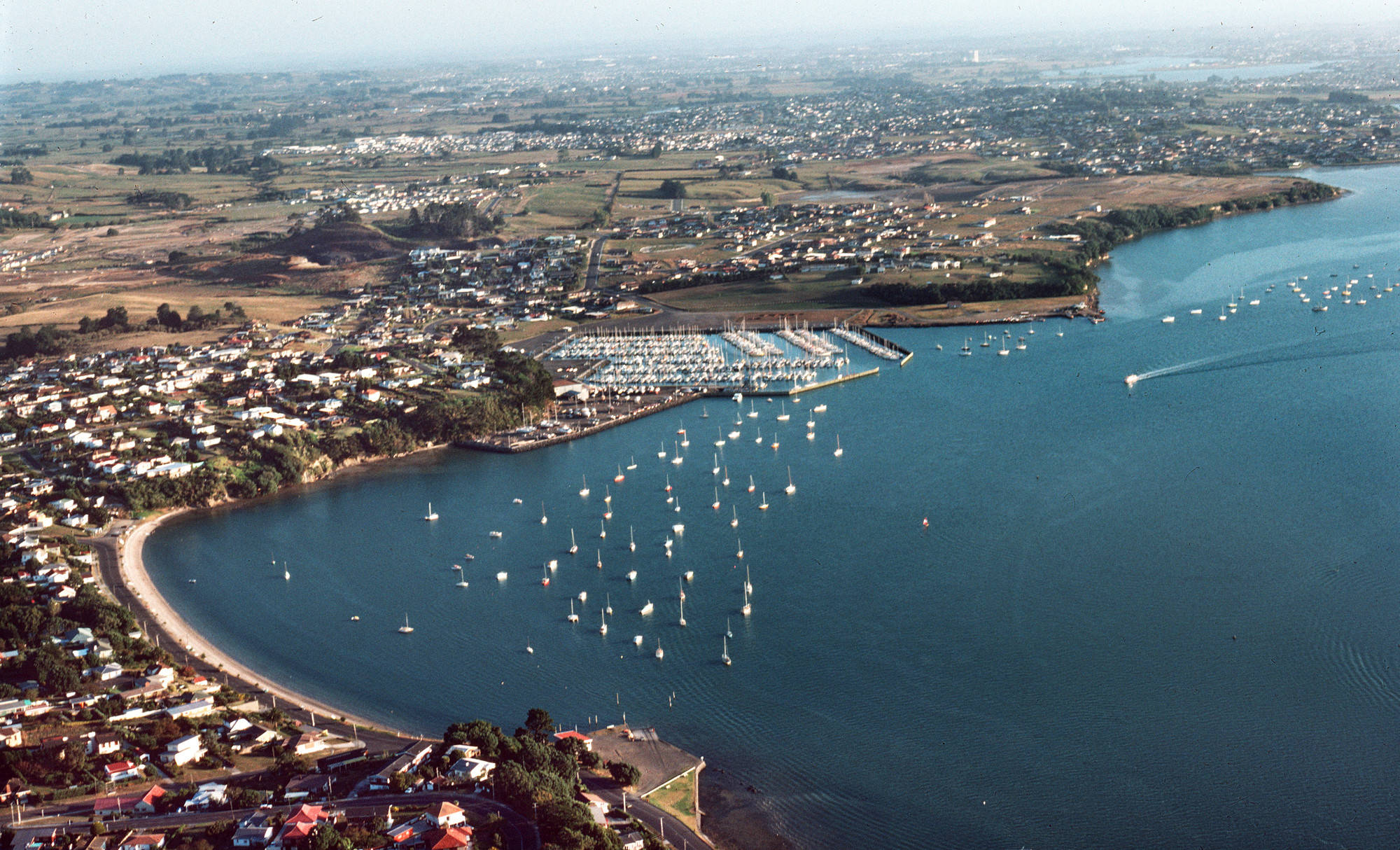
Aerial view of Half Moon Bay and the marina in 1976

Half Moon Bay is located on the western side of a peninsula between the Tāmaki River and the Tāmaki Strait of the Hauraki Gulf. The bay itself is found to the north of the suburb, and Wakaaranga Creek forms a border to the south. Part of the shoreline of Half Moon Bay is a lava flow that was formed approximately 10,000 years ago during the eruption of Maungarei.

Ōhuiarangi / Pigeon Mountain is a 53 metre high volcano found in the centre of the suburb. Part of the Auckland volcanic field, the volcano erupted an estimated 23,400 years ago. The mountain was extensively quarried from 1913 to the 1970s, with the entire north half of the volcano removed.

== History ==
=== Māori history ===
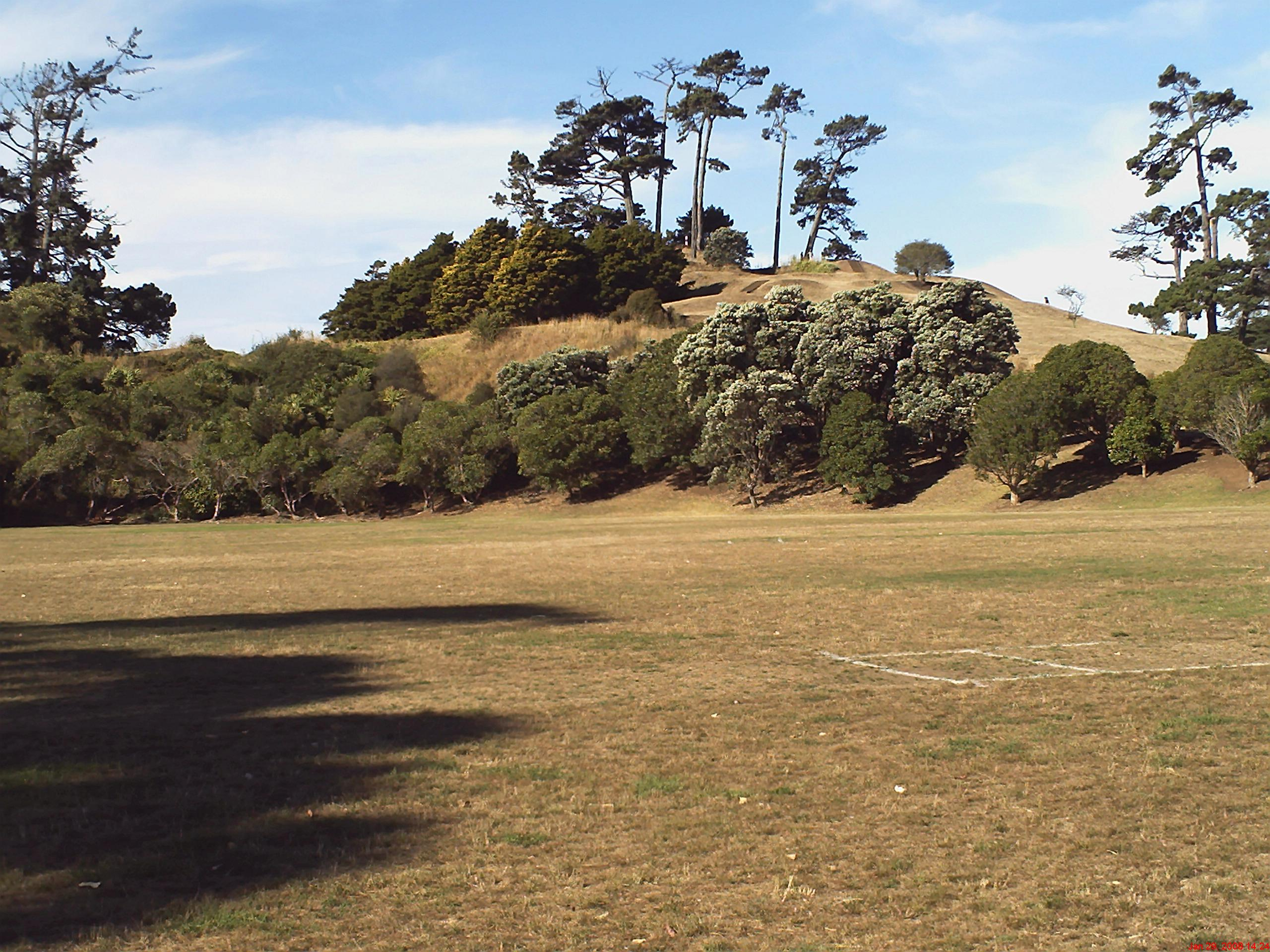
Ōhuiarangi / Pigeon Mountain was an important defended pā site for Ngāi Tai ki Tāmaki, surrounded by stonefield gardens

The Half Moon Bay area is part of the rohe of Ngāi Tai ki Tāmaki, who descend from the crew of the Tainui migratory waka, who visited the area around the year 1300. The mouth of the Tāmaki River was traditionally known as Te Wai ō Tāiki ("The Waters of Tāiki"), named after the Ngāi Tai ancestor Tāiki. Tāiki settled with his followers along the eastern shores of the Tāmaki River, alongside the descendants of Huiārangi of the early iwi Te Tini ō Maruiwi.

Ōhuiarangi / Pigeon Mountain was an important pā site for Ngāi Tai ki Tāmaki, named after ancestress Huiārangi, daughter of Tāmaki of Te Tini ō Maruiwi. The slopes of the mountain and surrounding areas were home to extensive stonefield gardens, and the mountain was an important location for snaring kererū. In approximately the first half of the 18th century, Ngāriki, a rangatira of Ngāi Tai, built a fortified pā at Te Naupata (Musick Point), the headland at the end of the peninsula, called Te Waiārohia (a shortening of Te Waiārohia ō Ngāriki). The followers of Ngāriki also settled at the Ōhuiarangi pā. From the 1790s, Te Rangitāwhia was the paramount chief of Ngāi Tai, whose principal residences were at Waiārohia and to the south at Ōhuiarangi / Pigeon Mountain. After the village was attacked by Kapetaua of the related iwi Te Patukirikiri, Ngāi Tai built a smaller pā on the mountain.

During the Musket Wars in the 1820s, the Half Moon Bay area was evacuated, and the lands became tapu to Ngāi Tai due to the events of the conflict. Most members of Ngāi Tai fled to the Waikato for temporary refuge during this time, and when English missionary William Thomas Fairburn visited the area in 1833, it was mostly unoccupied.

In 1836, William Thomas Fairburn brokered a land sale between Tāmaki Māori chiefs covering the majority of modern-day South Auckland, East Auckland and the Pōhutukawa Coast. The sale was envisioned as a way to end hostilities in the area, but it is unclear what the chiefs understood or consented to. Māori continued to live in the area, unchanged by this sale. In 1854 when Fairburn's purchase was investigated by the New Zealand Land Commission, a Ngāi Tai reserve was created around the Wairoa River and Umupuia areas, and as a part of the agreement, members of Ngāi Tai agreed to leave their traditional settlements to the west.

=== European settlement ===
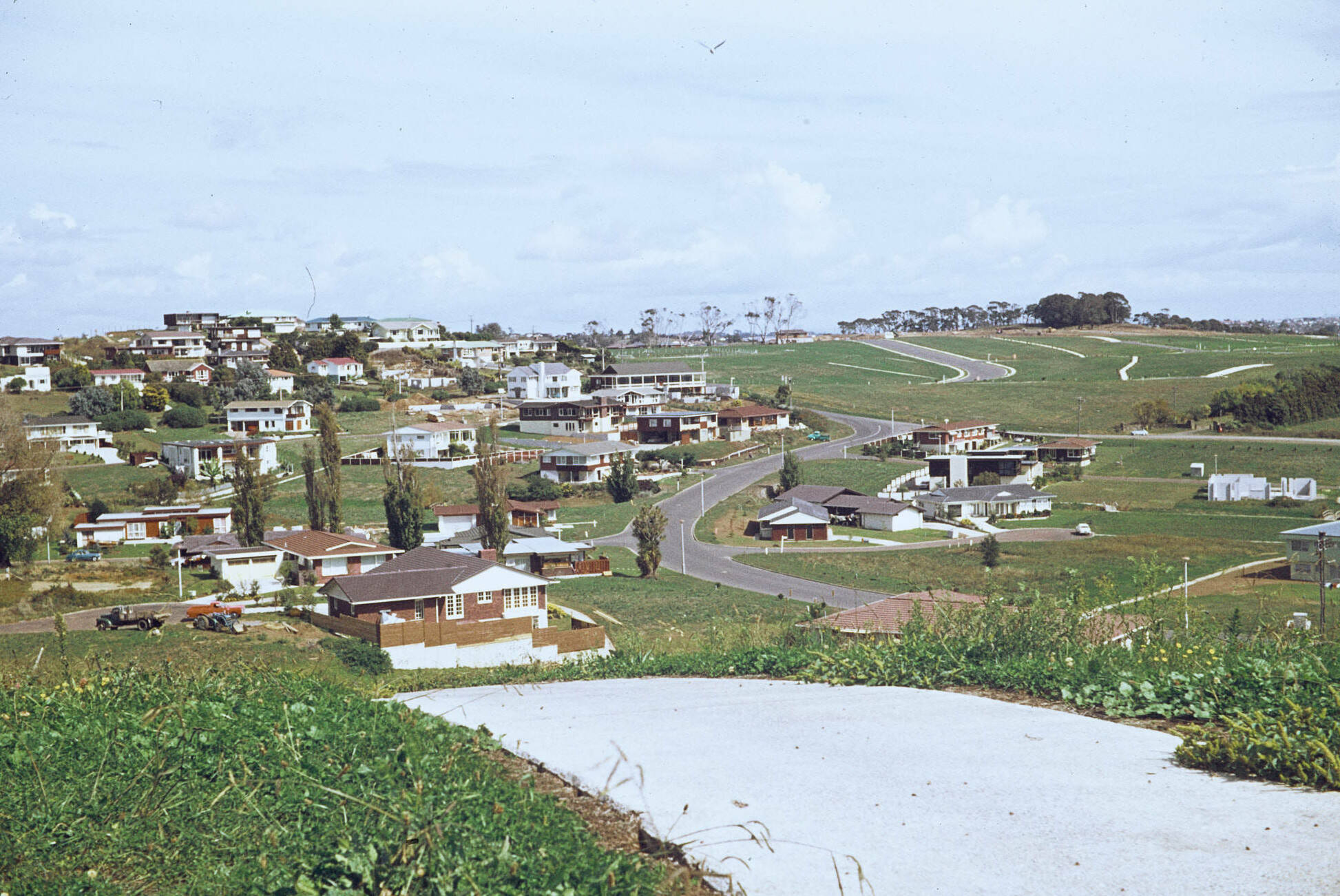
New housing developing at Half Moon Bay in 1973

In 1847, Howick was established as a defensive outpost for Auckland, by fencibles (retired British Army soldiers) and their families. The area was close to Tamaki Landing, the ferry launching point at Bucklands Beach that connected the area to Panmure and Point England. The bay became known as Barn Bay, or Hancock's Bay, after Herbert John Hancock, a long time tenant of the major farm in the area.

In the early 20th Century, Half Moon Bay became a popular location for picnicking. In 1949, the King George V Memorial Health Camp was opened, as a location for children to recuperate from illness. This led to the bay becoming known as Camp Bay.

In 1967, Unit Subdividisons Ltd began subdividing the area, adopting the name Half Moon Bay. A large-scale marina was established in the suburb, which officially opened in 1972. In 1976, a shopping district was opened at the marina.

The Bucklands Beach Yacht Club moved to Half Moon Bay, and opened new clubrooms in 1988. The first ferry services between the Auckland City Centre and Half Moon Bay began in 1999.

== Demographics ==
Half Moon Bay covers 2.62 km^{2} (1.01 sq mi) and had an estimated population of 8,650 as of June 2025, with a population density of 3,302 people per km^{2}.

Historical population
Year	Pop.	±% p.a.
2006	7,425	—
2013	7,809	+0.72%
2018	8,106	+0.75%
2023	8,061	−0.11%

Half Moon Bay had a population of 8,061 in the 2023 New Zealand census, a decrease of 45 people (−0.6%) since the 2018 census, and an increase of 252 people (3.2%) since the 2013 census. There were 3,993 males, 4,044 females and 27 people of other genders in 2,649 dwellings. 2.5% of people identified as LGBTIQ+. The median age was 40.1 years (compared with 38.1 years nationally). There were 1,641 people (20.4%) aged under 15 years, 1,410 (17.5%) aged 15 to 29, 3,771 (46.8%) aged 30 to 64, and 1,242 (15.4%) aged 65 or older.

People could identify as more than one ethnicity. The results were 45.6% European (Pākehā); 5.4% Māori; 5.4% Pasifika; 48.3% Asian; 2.5% Middle Eastern, Latin American and African New Zealanders (MELAA); and 2.6% other, which includes people giving their ethnicity as "New Zealander". English was spoken by 89.7%, Māori language by 0.9%, Samoan by 1.0%, and other languages by 42.5%. No language could be spoken by 1.6% (e.g. too young to talk). New Zealand Sign Language was known by 0.2%. The percentage of people born overseas was 53.7, compared with 28.8% nationally.

Religious affiliations were 31.1% Christian, 2.8% Hindu, 1.8% Islam, 0.2% Māori religious beliefs, 3.4% Buddhist, 0.1% New Age, 0.1% Jewish, and 2.3% other religions. People who answered that they had no religion were 52.1%, and 6.2% of people did not answer the census question.

Of those at least 15 years old, 2,187 (34.1%) people had a bachelor's or higher degree, 2,580 (40.2%) had a post-high school certificate or diploma, and 1,659 (25.8%) people exclusively held high school qualifications. The median income was $43,500, compared with $41,500 nationally. 939 people (14.6%) earned over $100,000 compared to 12.1% nationally. The employment status of those at least 15 was that 3,282 (51.1%) people were employed full-time, 801 (12.5%) were part-time, and 165 (2.6%) were unemployed.

Individual statistical areas
Name	Area (km^{2})	Population	Density (per km^{2})	Dwellings	Median age	Median income
Half Moon Bay West	1.14	2,775	2,434	1,002	44.6 years	$48,500
Half Moon Bay North East	0.65	2,247	3,457	672	40.0 years	$40,100
Half Moon Bay South East	0.84	3,042	3,621	975	35.9 years	$41,200
New Zealand					38.1 years	$41,500

== Education ==
Pakuranga College is a coeducational secondary school (years 9–13) with a roll of 2,270 as of July 2026.

== Bibliography ==
- La Roche, Alan (2011). Grey's Folly: A History of Howick, Pakuranga, Bucklands-Eastern Beaches, East Tamaki, Whitford, Beachlands and Maraetai. Auckland: Tui Vale Productions. ISBN 978-0-473-18547-3. OCLC 1135039710. Wikidata Q118286377.
