= Highland Park, New Zealand =

Highland Park
- Suburb
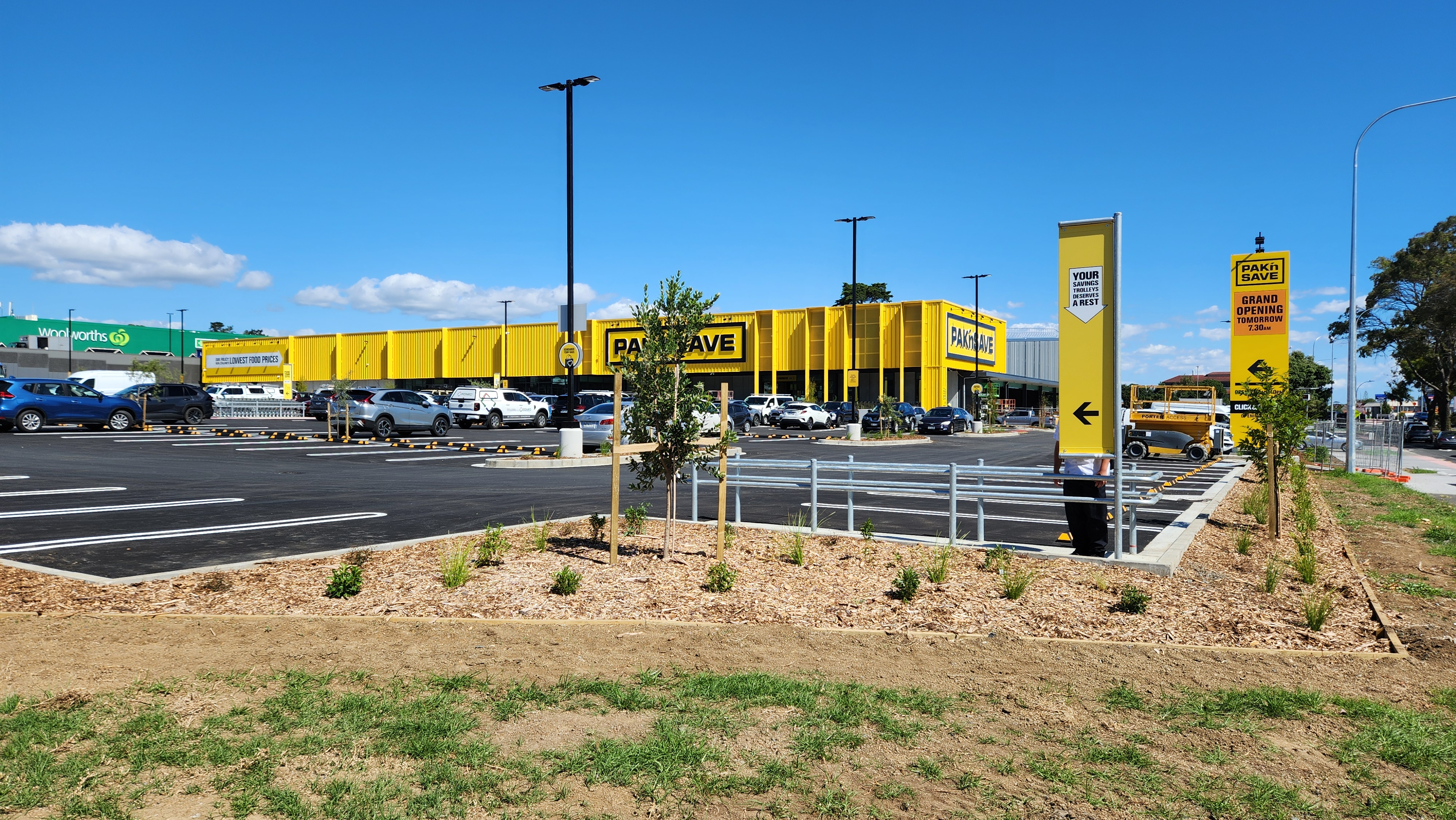
- Pak'nSave Highland Park
- Interactive map of Highland Park
- Coordinates: 36°53′58″S 174°54′21″E
- Country: New Zealand
- City: Auckland
- Local authority: Auckland Council
- Electoral ward: Howick ward
- Local board: Howick Local Board

Area
  - Land: 116 ha (290 acres)

Population (June 2025)
  - Total: 4,300
  - Density: 3,700/km^{2} (9,600/sq mi)

Half Moon Bay	Bucklands Beach	Mellons Bay
Sunnyhills	Highland Park	Howick
Pakuranga Heights	Golflands	Botany Downs

Highland Park is a suburb of Auckland, New Zealand, located between Howick and Pakuranga. It belongs to the Pakuranga electorate which is currently represented by Simeon Brown.

== Geography ==
Highland Park is located in the central peninsula of East Auckland, west of Howick, New Zealand. The Pakuranga Stream, a tributary of the Pakuranga Creek, flows through the western portion of the suburb. Aviemore Drive is a major north-south arterial route in the suburb, connecting Pakuranga Road and Bucklands Beach Road to Cascades Road.

== History ==
In May 1972, the Manukau City Council sold the land at Highland Park Estate to Neil Construction Ltd, who developed housing on 650 subdivisions south of Pakuranga Road. The first houses were sold in February 1974. Highland Park Shopping Centre was developed on a nine-acre site in the north of the suburb by Progressive Enterprises, which opened in 1978. In the same year, the second Georgie Pie restaurant in New Zealand was opened at Highland Park, and was billed as the first drive-through restaurant in New Zealand. Both the suburb and the Highland Park Centre were themed around the Scottish Highlands, with a fort being constructed at the centre, and many of the street names of the suburb being Scottish in origin.

In December 2017, Highland Park Shopping Centre was purchased by Foodstuffs. When the lease ended in 2023, the shopping centre was demolished and construction of the new Pakn'Save Highland Park location began. It opened on 25 February 2025, as the largest new supermarket in New Zealand.

== Demographics ==
Highland Park covers 1.16 km^{2} (0.45 sq mi) and had an estimated population of 4,300 as of June 2025, with a population density of 3,707 people per km^{2}.

Historical population
Year	Pop.	±% p.a.
2006	4,191	—
2013	3,753	−1.56%
2018	3,963	+1.09%
2023	4,008	+0.23%
The 2006 population is for a larger area of 1.38 km^{2}. Source:

Highland Park had a population of 4,008 in the 2023 New Zealand census, an increase of 45 people (1.1%) since the 2018 census, and an increase of 255 people (6.8%) since the 2013 census. There were 1,965 males, 2,031 females and 12 people of other genders in 1,425 dwellings. 2.5% of people identified as LGBTIQ+. The median age was 40.1 years (compared with 38.1 years nationally). There were 651 people (16.2%) aged under 15 years, 735 (18.3%) aged 15 to 29, 1,815 (45.3%) aged 30 to 64, and 810 (20.2%) aged 65 or older.

People could identify as more than one ethnicity. The results were 43.7% European (Pākehā); 6.1% Māori; 7.7% Pasifika; 47.8% Asian; 3.0% Middle Eastern, Latin American and African New Zealanders (MELAA); and 2.7% other, which includes people giving their ethnicity as "New Zealander". English was spoken by 87.4%, Māori language by 1.0%, Samoan by 1.4%, and other languages by 42.8%. No language could be spoken by 2.5% (e.g. too young to talk). New Zealand Sign Language was known by 0.3%. The percentage of people born overseas was 56.7, compared with 28.8% nationally.

Religious affiliations were 35.0% Christian, 2.9% Hindu, 2.2% Islam, 0.1% Māori religious beliefs, 3.1% Buddhist, 0.4% New Age, 0.1% Jewish, and 1.9% other religions. People who answered that they had no religion were 48.4%, and 6.1% of people did not answer the census question.

Of those at least 15 years old, 936 (27.9%) people had a bachelor's or higher degree, 1,389 (41.4%) had a post-high school certificate or diploma, and 1,035 (30.8%) people exclusively held high school qualifications. The median income was $36,300, compared with $41,500 nationally. 273 people (8.1%) earned over $100,000 compared to 12.1% nationally. The employment status of those at least 15 was that 1,641 (48.9%) people were employed full-time, 375 (11.2%) were part-time, and 93 (2.8%) were unemployed.

== Amenities ==
- The Cascade Walkway, a public walkway along the Pakuranga Creek that connects Highland Park to Lloyd Elsmore Park in the west.
- William Green Domain, a public park and home for the Fencibles United association football club.

== Bibliography ==
- La Roche, Alan (2011). Grey's Folly: A History of Howick, Pakuranga, Bucklands-Eastern Beaches, East Tamaki, Whitford, Beachlands and Maraetai. Auckland: Tui Vale Productions. ISBN 978-0-473-18547-3. OCLC 1135039710. Wikidata Q118286377.
