= Howick, New Zealand =

Howick
- Suburb
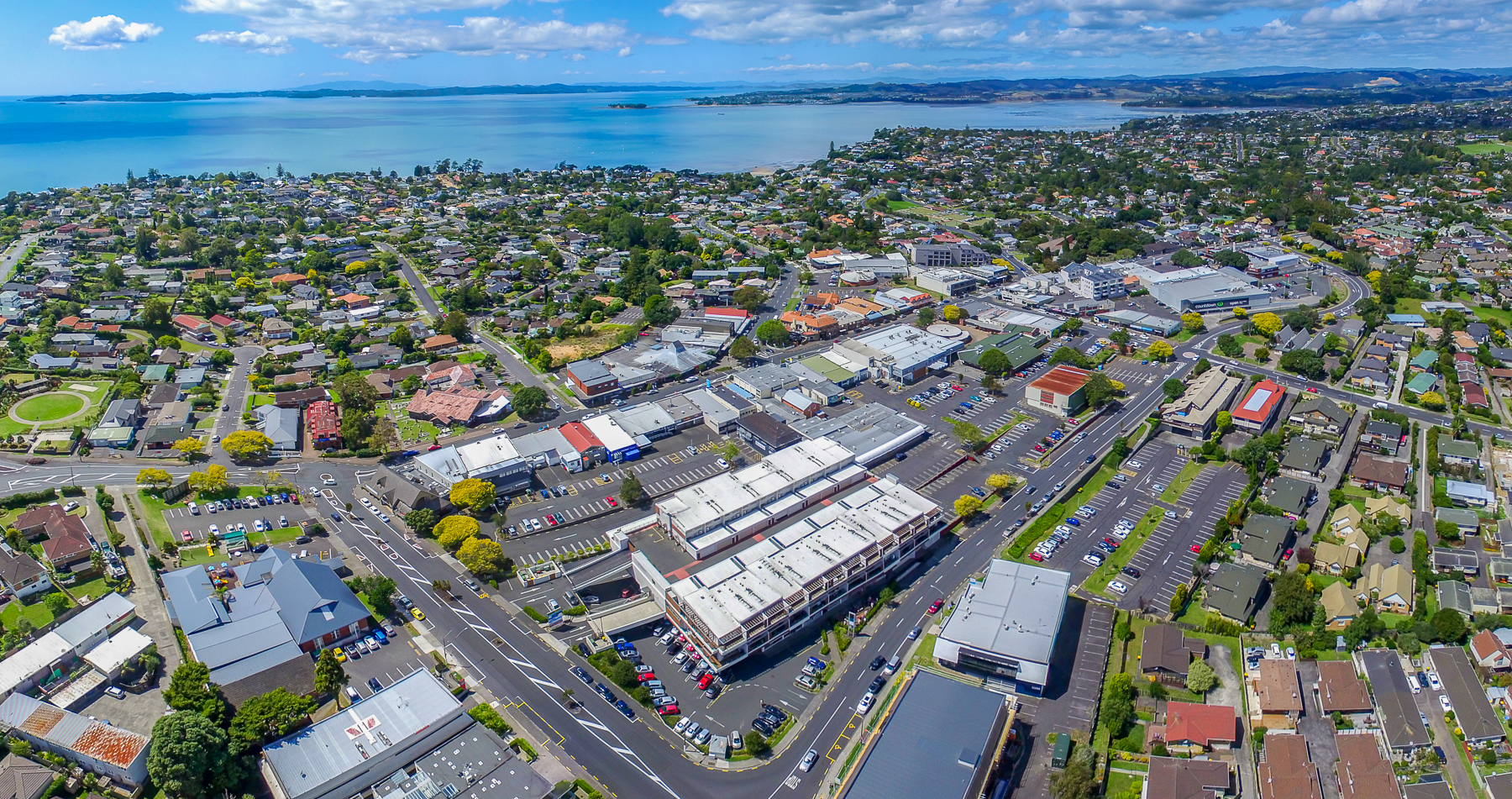
- Howick village seen from above
- Interactive map of Howick
- Coordinates: 36.894°S 174.932°E
- Country: New Zealand
- City: Auckland
- Local authority: Auckland Council
- Electoral ward: Howick ward
- Local board: Howick Local Board
- Established: 1847 (European)

Area
  - Land: 316 ha (780 acres)

Population (June 2025)
  - Total: 12,640
  - Density: 4,000/km^{2} (10,400/sq mi)

Eastern Beach	(Hauraki Gulf)	Mellons Bay
Half Moon Bay	Howick	Cockle Bay
Highland Park	Botany Downs	Shelly Park

Howick is a suburb of East Auckland, New Zealand. The area was traditionally settled by Ngāi Tai ki Tāmaki, and in 1847 Howick was established as a defensive settlement for Auckland, by veteran fencible soldiers of the British Army. Howick was a small agricultural centre until the 1950s, when it developed into a suburban area of Auckland.

== Geography ==
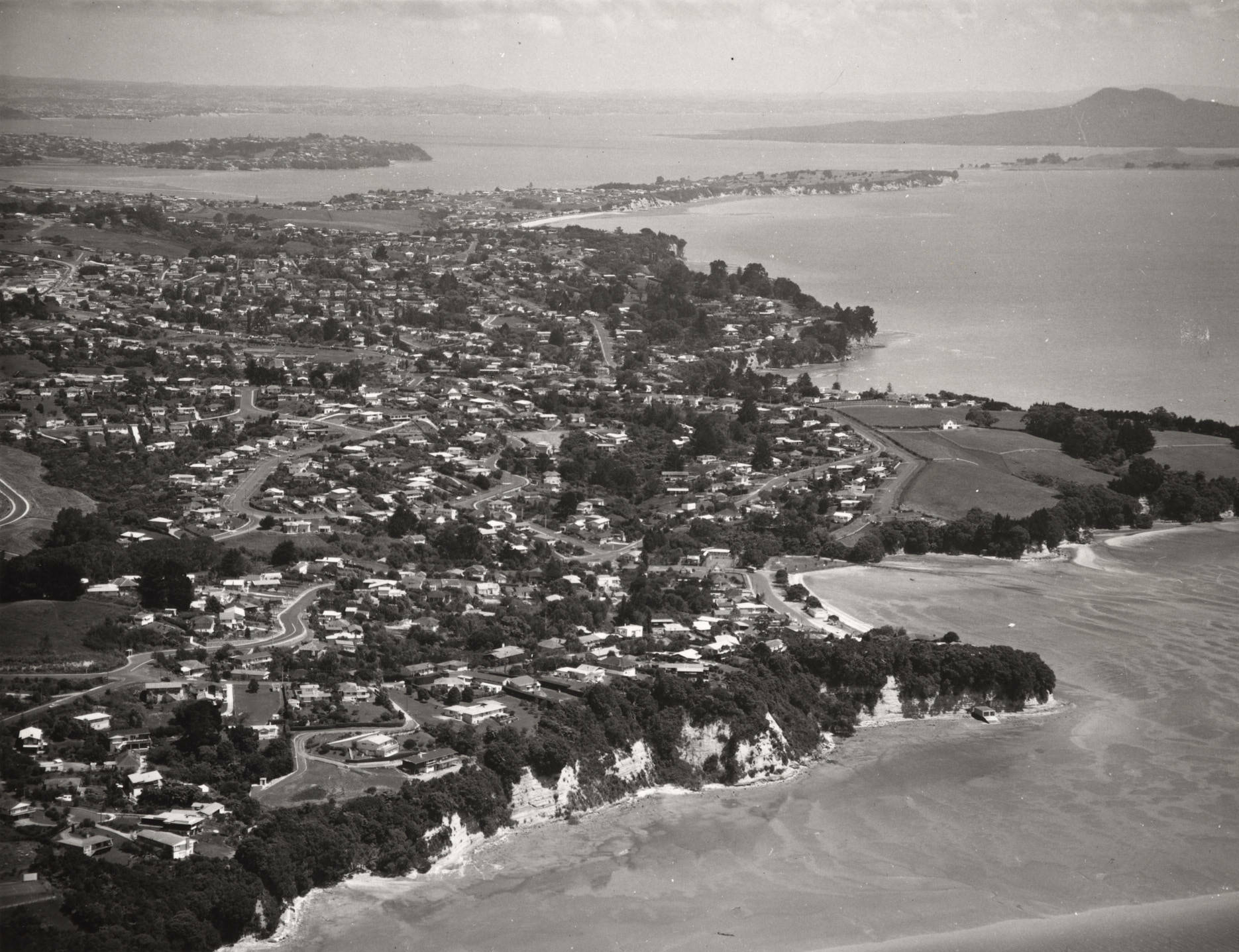
Aerial view of the wider Howick area in 1970, showing the Tāmaki Strait, Musick Point, and Rangitoto

Howick is located in the central peninsula of East Auckland, between the Tāmaki River and Tāmaki Strait of the Hauraki Gulf. Waipaparoa / Howick Beach is located to the north-east of the suburb, adjacent to Mellons Bay in the west and Cockle Bay in the east. Waipaparoa / Howick Beach looks out towards the Tāmaki Strait, Waiheke Island, Motukaraka Island and Beachlands. The soil around Howick is primarily clay and sandstone.

== Etymology ==
Howick was named after Henry Grey, 3rd Earl Grey, a name chosen by Governor George Grey in 1847. The Earl was formerly known as Viscount Howick, and his family home in Alnwick, Northumberland. Earl Grey was the Secretary of State for the Colonies who decided to settle British Army veterans in settlements around Auckland. The traditional Tāmaki Māori names for the coastal area were Paparoa and Waipaparoa, and Ōwairoa was used to describe the swampy inland area where the Howick village was established. The names Howick, Owairoa and Paparoa were used interchangeably by European settlers until 1923, when the Howick Town Board was established.

== History ==
=== Māori history ===
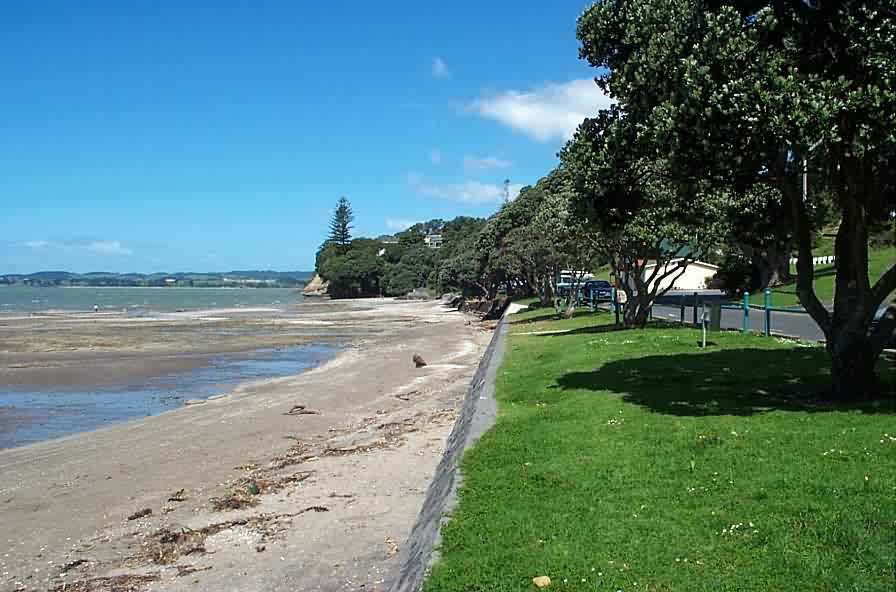
The eastern end of Waipaparoa / Howick Beach is the location of Paparoa, a fortified pā usef by Ngāi Tai ki Tāmaki

The Tāmaki Strait was visited by the Tainui migratory waka around the year 1300, and members of the crew settled around East Auckland and the Pōhutukawa Coast. These were the ancestors of the modern mana whenua of the area, Ngāi Tai ki Tāmaki. The traditional names for the beach and surrounding bay are Paparoa and Waipaparoa, with Waipaparoa referring to the wider bay between modern-day Howick and Beachlands, including the Turanga Creek. The Howick area was extensively cultivated, but as the area was relatively exposed, two fortified pā were constructed: Paparoa Pā at the south-eastern end of Waipaparoa / Howick Beach, and Tūwakamana Pā above Cockle Bay. In addition to agriculture, the Waipaparoa / Howick Beach area was known for pioke (shortspine spurdog sharks), which were caught in the near-by estuaries and dried at the beach. In the 1600s, the warrior Kāwharu attacked and razed Paparoa Pā, without taking occupation of the lands. While the wider area was still cultivated, the site of Paparoa Pā became a wāhi tapu (sacred and restricted) site to Ngāi Tai.

In 1836, English Missionary William Thomas Fairburn brokered a land sale between Tāmaki Māori chiefs, Pōtatau Te Wherowhero and Turia of Ngāti Te Rau, covering the majority of modern-day South Auckland, East Auckland and the Pōhutukawa Coast. The sale was envisioned by the church and the chiefs as a way to end hostilities in the area, but it is unclear what the chiefs understood or consented to. Māori continued to live in the area, unchanged by this sale. Fairburn's Purchase was investigated by the New Zealand Land Commission found to be excessive and reduced in size. The disallowed parts of his purchase were not returned to Ngāi Tai, however in 1854 a reserve was created for Ngāi Tai around the Wairoa River and Umupuia. As a part of this arrangement, Ngāi Tai agreed not to settle elsewhere in the region, which included Howick.

=== Establishment of Howick ===
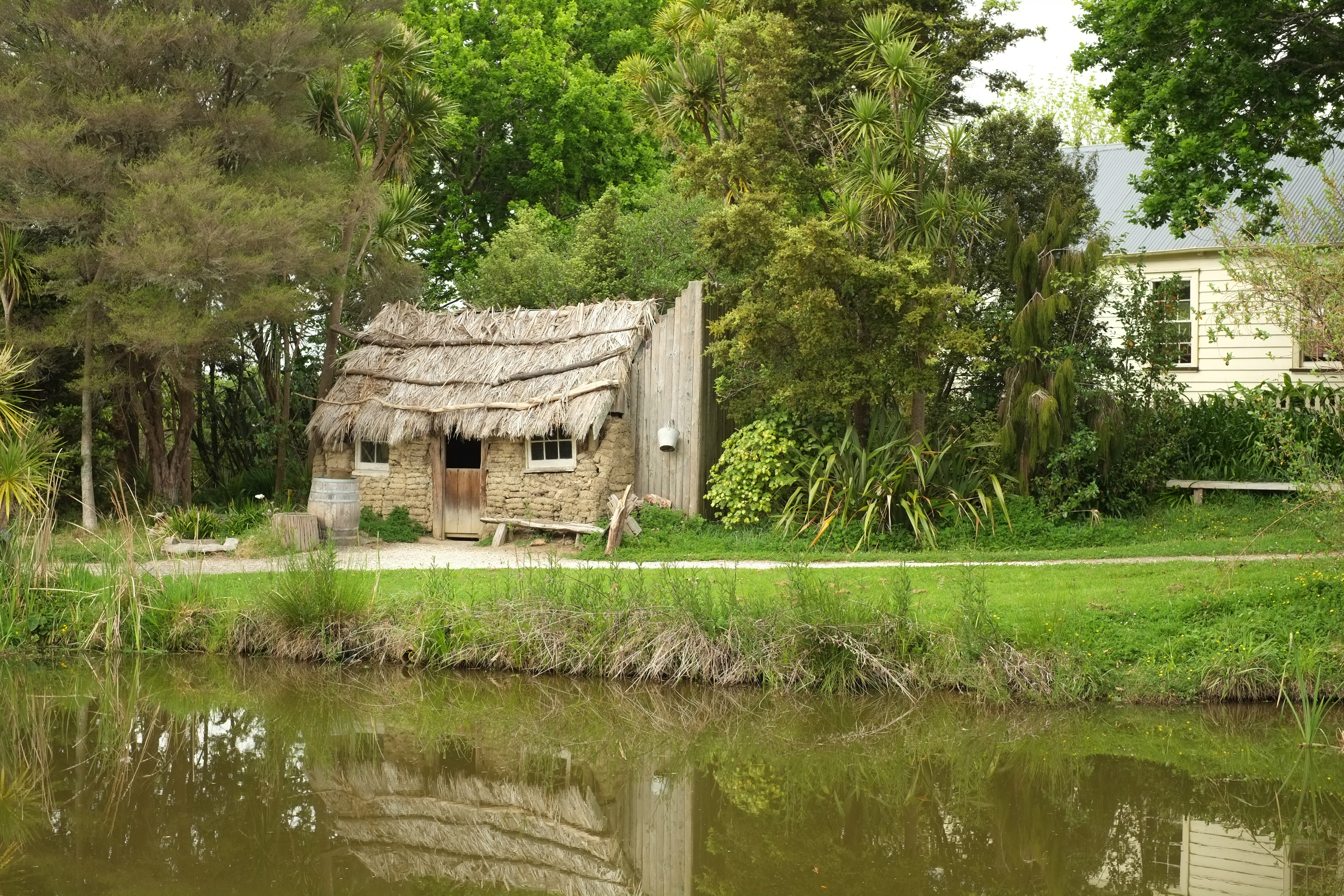
Reconstruction of a settlers' raupō cottage at Howick Historical Village

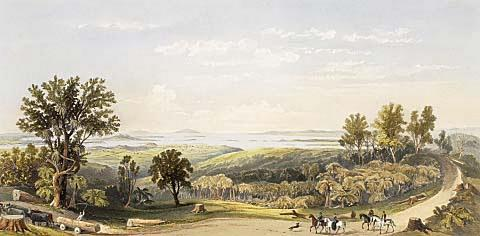
Watercolour of Howick village and the Waitematā Harbour in 1862

Howick was established in 1847 as a defensive outpost for Auckland, by fencibles (retired British Army soldiers) and their families. Governor George Grey, Bishop George Selwyn, Major Mathew Richmond and Felton Mathew chose the site in October 1847, at a location known to early colonists as Owairoa. The decision to establish on site was controversial. It was allegedly chosen to protect Auckland against potential invasion from Marutūāhu tribes to the east, but the site was too far inland to serve this purpose. As the Crown owned the entirety of the land at Howick, the Government could directly profit from the land sales to fencible settlers.

The fencibles arrived between 1847 and 1852, with the first ships arriving at Waiapaparoa / Howick Beach. Early settlers struggled to establish themselves on the land. Almost no trees were found in the district that could be used for construction, and the soil was primarily clay, compared to other fencible settlements such as Ōtāhuhu and Panmure that were established on volcanic soils more suitable for farming. In 1849 when William Fox of the New Zealand Company visited Howick, he described the settlement as a costly failure. The settlers were promised that houses would be constructed for their families, however this had not occurred by their arrival. The first cottages were constructed from raupō with help from Ngāi Tai, and by December 1849 most of these had been replaced with wooden cottages.

The fencible settlers were primarily poor, and were evenly split between Catholic and Protestant families. All Saints Church was constructed in Howick in 1847, as the first Anglican parish church in Auckland. The Government was widely criticised for not providing many employment opportunities for the fencible settlers. Early settlers often found work on Government projects such as road construction, drainage or clearing allotments, while others worked for farmers. Many fencibles lived in Auckland for work, but were obliged to return to Howick on Sundays, otherwise they could be charged with mutiny under the Fencibles Act.

Howick village developed around the Howick Domain, and grew overtime to become a service centre for the surrounding rural areas. The settlers were dependent on water transport and ferry services, until the construction of the Panmure Bridge across the Tāmaki River in 1865. Howick was developed into an English-style village by the settlers, becoming known as an area where potatoes and butter were produced. In the 1850s and 1860s the Howick District Acclimation Society worked to introduce English birds such as the thrush and blackbird to the area, to develop an English atmosphere and as a measure to combat caterpillars in the orchards of the area.

By 1854, many of the fencibles had completed their required seven years of service. Most stayed in Howick, with some moving to Auckland, the gold mine towns of the Coromandel Peninsula, or new defensive settlements to the south, such as Hunua, Papakura and Pukekawa.

In April 1861, news reached the village of the imminent Invasion of the Waikato. By July 1863, a defensive blockhouse was constructed in Howick, and 101 fencibles and their sons served in the war. In September 1863, the Ngāi Tai village of Ōtau near Clevedon was attacked by the British army, and the village was evacuated, with people moving to communities at the river's mouth. While Māori of South Auckland such as Te Ākitai Waiohua were forced to leave, Ngāi Tai were designated as a "friendly" people by the Crown, and remained neutral in the fighting. After the Native Lands Act of 1865, the Native Land Court confiscated many Ngāi Tai lands. The remaining land was individuated, slowly sold on to European farmers.

The first local government was established in the area in 1865, with the creation of the Howick Township Road Board.

In 1865, the capital of New Zealand was moved from Auckland to Wellington. This caused major financial problems for the residents of Howick, as income from butter dropped and land prices plummeted. By 1880, the population of the village had dropped to 220, down from 775 in 1848. The Howick Town Hall was constructed in 1884, and a number of social organisations such as the Howick Musical Association and Howick Cricket Club were established during this period.

=== Suburban development ===
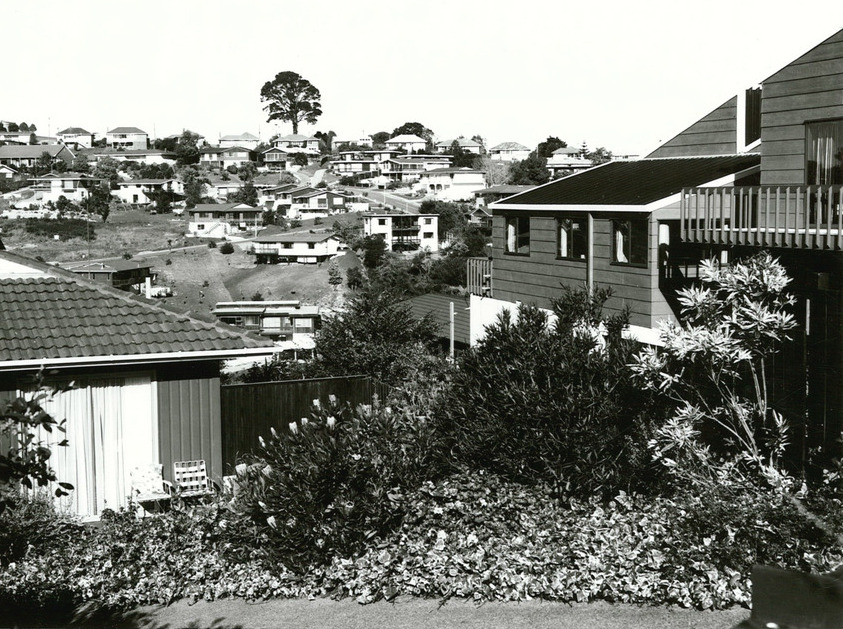
Suburban housing in Howick in 1978

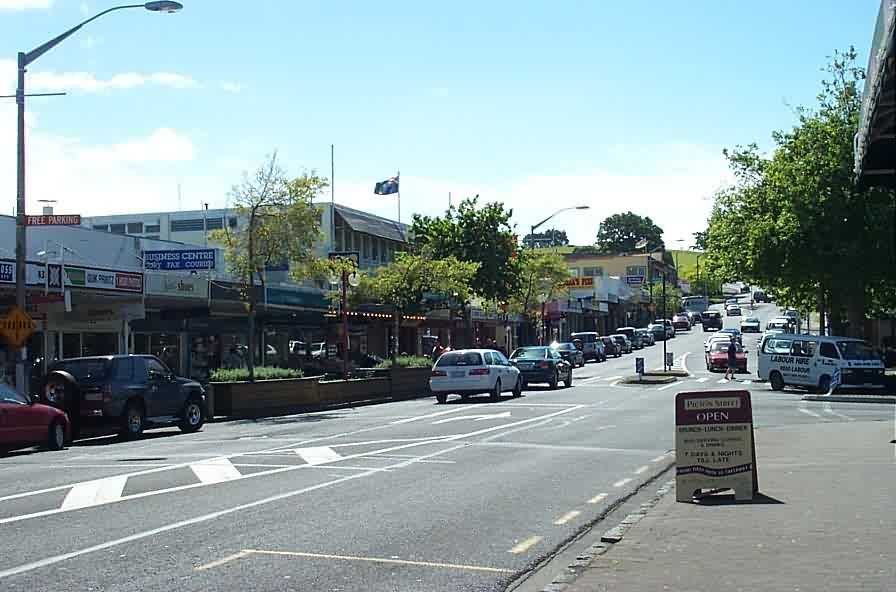
Picton Street in Howick in 2005

Until the 1920s, Howick had the reputation of being a sleepy English-style village. By 1921, the village had grown enough to become a town district within the Manukau County, and became a town district the following year. In the 1930s after a concrete road was constructed between Howick and Greenlane, Howick developed into a suburb for people working in Penrose, Westfield and Ōtāhuhu. Howick village held fundraising carnivals from the 1930s to the 1950s known as Queens Carnivals, where beauty pageants were held to choose an annual queen from the community to represent Howick businesses.

After World War II, many Dutch New Zealanders settled in Howick. The population had slowly grown to 1,500 when the settlement celebrated its centenary in 1947. In 1952, Howick split from the Manukau County to form its own borough. Major suburban growth occurred in Howick in the 1960s and 1970s, including the development of new suburbs in the surrounding areas. In the 1980s and 1990s, Howick developed as a location for Asian migrant communities. Entrepreneur Kit Wong established 100 shops at the Meadowlands shopping plaza, which included a number of businesses run by Chinese and Thai immigrants, such as restaurants.

== Government ==
=== Howick electorate ===
From 1993 and prior to the introduction of MMP in 1996, Howick had its own seat in Parliament, Howick; which had been created from part of the former Otara electorate.

In the 1996 general election, due to the need to decrease the number of general electorates to ensure a sufficient number of seats were available for list MPs, the population centres formerly in the Howick seat were merged into the former separate seat of Pakuranga.

While making recommendations for the boundaries to apply in the 2008 general election, the Electoral Commission recently proposed to resurrect the Howick seat. The planned seat would have taken in the population centres of Howick and Botany Downs-Dannemora but would have had the effect of splitting Bucklands Beach and Highland Park across two electorates. Due to this, and the planned move to incorporate Panmure, Point England and Glen Innes into the neighbouring Pakuranga seat, the commission received a significant number of objections from Pakuranga residents. The Commission eventually adopted the recommendation of Objector N17/30 in keeping the Howick suburb in Pakuranga and renaming the new seat Botany, with a corresponding shift in centre of gravity to the new suburb of Flat Bush.

=== Local government ===
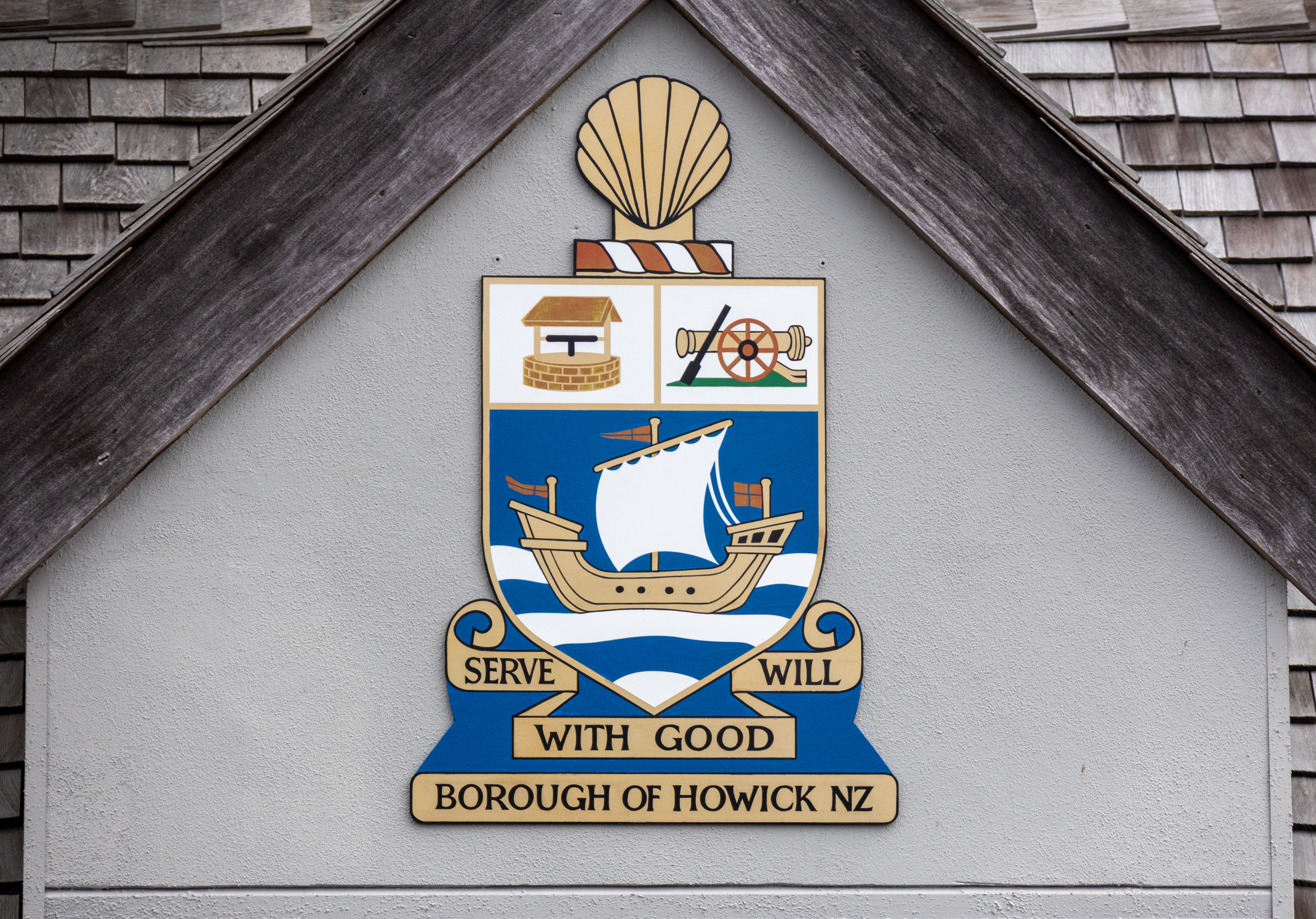
Coat of arms of the Howick Borough Council (1955–1989) on Howick Village Bus Shelter

The first local government in the area was the Howick Township Road Board, which was established 3 March 1865 and in operation by 20 March. By 1921, the village had grown enough to become a town district within the Manukau County, becoming a borough in 1952. In 1959 parts of Manukau County were annexed by Howick. As a part of the 1989 New Zealand local government reforms, Howick Borough was incorporated into Manukau City. In November 2010, all cities and districts of the Auckland Region were amalgamated into a single body, governed by the Auckland Council.

Howick is part of the Howick local board area, who elects members of the Howick Local Board. Residents of Howick also elect two Howick ward councillors, who sits on the Auckland Council.

==== Mayors of Howick ====
During its existence from 1952 to 1989, the borough of Howick had six mayors:

	Name	Term
1	Ernie La Roche	1952–1953
2	William Stevenson	1953–1962
3	Walter Haddrell	1962–1965
4	Cecil Litten	1965–1966
5	Whitford Blundell	1966–1974
6	Morrin Cooper	1974–1989

== Notable places ==
=== Museums ===
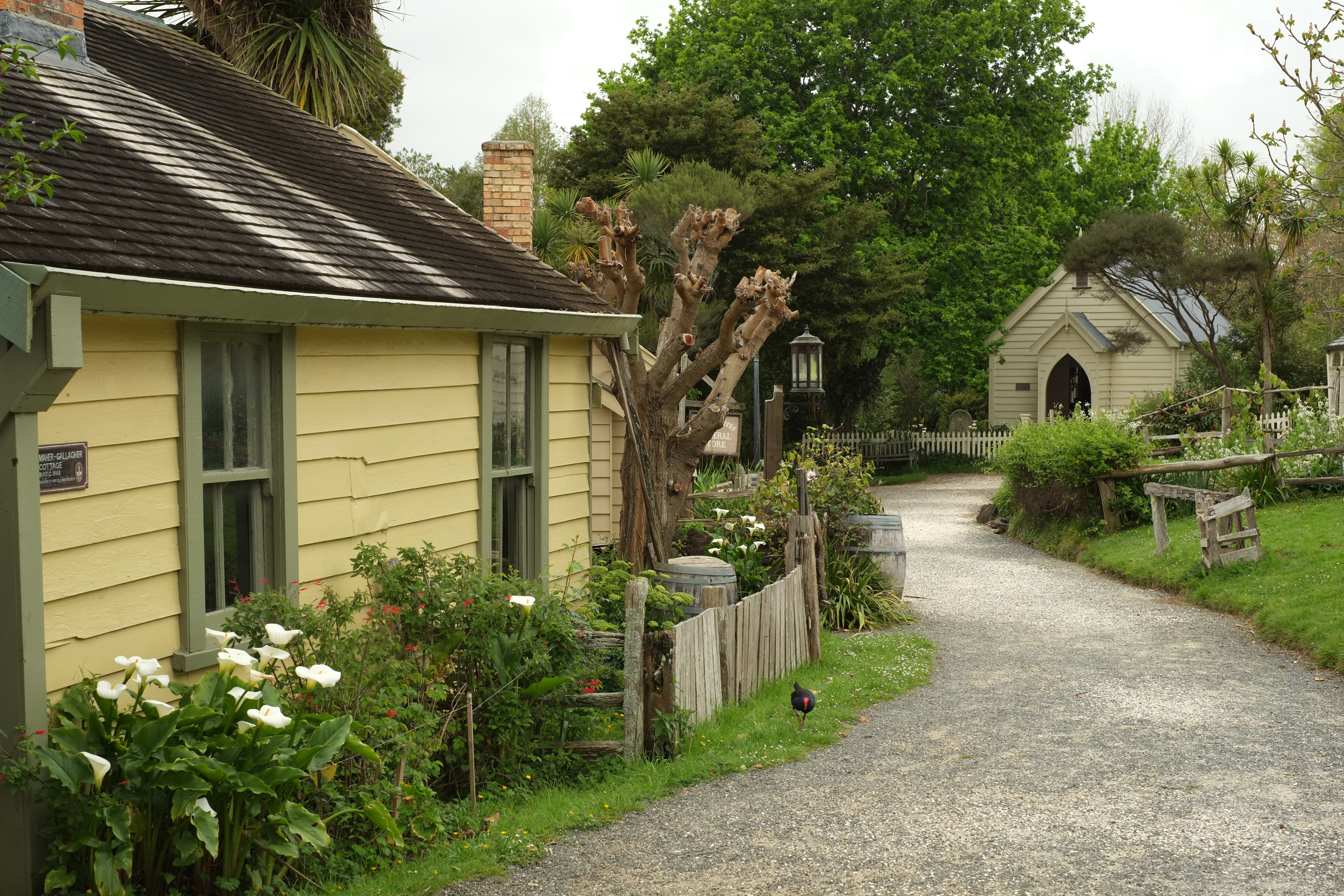
Howick Historical Village in Lloyd Elsmore Park, Pakuranga

Howick Historical Village, a living history museum run by Howick & Districts Historical Society and located in Pakuranga, opened in 1980 to recreate the Fencible settlement of Howick. The original historic buildings, sourced from around Howick and its environs, were saved from demolition between the mid 1960s and early 1980s and moved to Lloyd Elsmore Park in Pakuranga.

The Polish Heritage Trust Museum has been operating in Howick in 2004.

=== Emilia Maud Nixon Garden of Memories ===
Originally built in the mid-1930s, a small wharenui is located behind the village's library and arts centre. The 'Garden of Memories' was developed by Howick resident Emilia Maude Nixon to "promote understanding, harmony and goodwill between all people". Nixon planted native trees and grew traditional food eaten by Maori. A waka was also located in the garden, with the wharenui named Torere – after the daughter of Hoturoa, the chief of the Tainui. Kuia and kaumātua visited the garden for a dedication in 1936.

After Nixon's death in 1962, the garden was managed by the Howick Borough Council while Torere was managed by the Howick and District Historical Society. In the following decades, the wharenui was occasionally vandalised and left largely unmaintained. The original structure was demolished and rebuilt by the Manukau City Council following the 1989 New Zealand local government reforms – though the wharenui's facade and carvings were maintained. Following the rebuilding of Torere, the building was used for classes and activities organised by volunteers.

An attempt to name the wharenui a "marae" by its managing trust prompted over 300 submissions by residents in 1997 – and signs bearing the name were gratified over. The opposition and council response sparked a Race Relations Office investigation. But Torere itself was damaged beyond repair following a fire in October 2004 – fire investigators found the incident was likely a result of an arson attack, while some locals blamed the fire on an electrical fault. The wharenui rebuild project was contested by some locals, notably the Howick Ratepayers and Residents Association, and was only completed in 2011.

=== Buildings ===
The McMillan Homestead is located on Bleakhouse Road and was built in the 1880s.

All Saints' Church is a category I heritage listed Church located in Howick that was constructed in 1847.

== Sport and recreation ==
Howick is home to Fencibles United association football club, who compete in the Lotto Sport Italia NRFL Division 2, and the Howick Hornets rugby league club, who compete in Auckland Rugby League's top division, the Fox Memorial.

== Demographics ==
Howick covers 3.16 km^{2} (1.22 sq mi) and had an estimated population of 12,640 as of June 2025, with a population density of 4,000 people per km^{2}.

Historical population
Year	Pop.	±% p.a.
2006	9,798	—
2013	10,512	+1.01%
2018	11,064	+1.03%
2023	11,523	+0.82%

Howick had a population of 11,523 in the 2023 New Zealand census, an increase of 459 people (4.1%) since the 2018 census, and an increase of 1,011 people (9.6%) since the 2013 census. There were 5,661 males, 5,829 females and 36 people of other genders in 4,011 dwellings. 2.7% of people identified as LGBTIQ+. The median age was 38.3 years (compared with 38.1 years nationally). There were 2,274 people (19.7%) aged under 15 years, 2,025 (17.6%) aged 15 to 29, 5,514 (47.9%) aged 30 to 64, and 1,707 (14.8%) aged 65 or older.

People could identify as more than one ethnicity. The results were 59.6% European (Pākehā); 7.8% Māori; 5.7% Pasifika; 33.5% Asian; 2.1% Middle Eastern, Latin American and African New Zealanders (MELAA); and 2.9% other, which includes people giving their ethnicity as "New Zealander". English was spoken by 92.0%, Māori language by 1.1%, Samoan by 1.1%, and other languages by 31.4%. No language could be spoken by 2.4% (e.g. too young to talk). New Zealand Sign Language was known by 0.2%. The percentage of people born overseas was 48.1, compared with 28.8% nationally.

Religious affiliations were 35.3% Christian, 3.2% Hindu, 1.5% Islam, 0.3% Māori religious beliefs, 2.4% Buddhist, 0.2% New Age, 0.1% Jewish, and 2.3% other religions. People who answered that they had no religion were 48.2%, and 6.6% of people did not answer the census question.

Of those at least 15 years old, 2,856 (30.9%) people had a bachelor's or higher degree, 4,125 (44.6%) had a post-high school certificate or diploma, and 2,274 (24.6%) people exclusively held high school qualifications. The median income was $46,500, compared with $41,500 nationally. 1,443 people (15.6%) earned over $100,000 compared to 12.1% nationally. The employment status of those at least 15 was that 5,031 (54.4%) people were employed full-time, 1,137 (12.3%) were part-time, and 222 (2.4%) were unemployed.

Individual statistical areas
Name	Area (km^{2})	Population	Density (per km^{2})	Dwellings	Median age	Median income
Howick West	1.19	4,074	3,424	1,323	38.8 years	$44,300
Howick Central	0.86	3,681	4,280	1,281	37.5 years	$46,300
Howick East	1.11	3,768	3,395	1,407	38.8 years	$48,800
New Zealand					38.1 years	$41,500

== Education ==
Howick Intermediate School is an intermediate school (years 7–8) with a roll of 605. Howick Primary School and Owairoa Primary School are contributing primary schools (years 1–6) with rolls of 318 and 805 students, respectively

All these schools are coeducational. Rolls are as of July 2026.

Our Lady Star of the Sea School is a state-integrated coeducational Catholic contributing primary school (Year 1–6) with a roll of 297 as of July 2026.

== Bibliography ==
- Alexander, Ruth; Gibson, Gail; la Roche, Alan (1997). The Royal New Zealand Fencibles, 1847–1852. New Zealand Fencible Society. ISBN 0473047160.
- La Roche, Alan (2011). Grey's Folly: A History of Howick, Pakuranga, Bucklands-Eastern Beaches, East Tamaki, Whitford, Beachlands and Maraetai. Auckland: Tui Vale Productions. ISBN 978-0-473-18547-3. OCLC 1135039710. Wikidata Q118286377.
- La Roche, John (2011). "Tamaki River Bridge, Panmure". In La Roche, John (ed.). Evolving Auckland: The City's Engineering Heritage. Wily Publications. ISBN 9781927167038.
- Bloomfield, Gerald Taylor (1973). The Evolution of Local Government Areas in Metropolitan Auckland, 1840-1971. Auckland: Auckland University Press. ISBN 0-19-647714-X.
