= Mellons Bay =

- Suburb
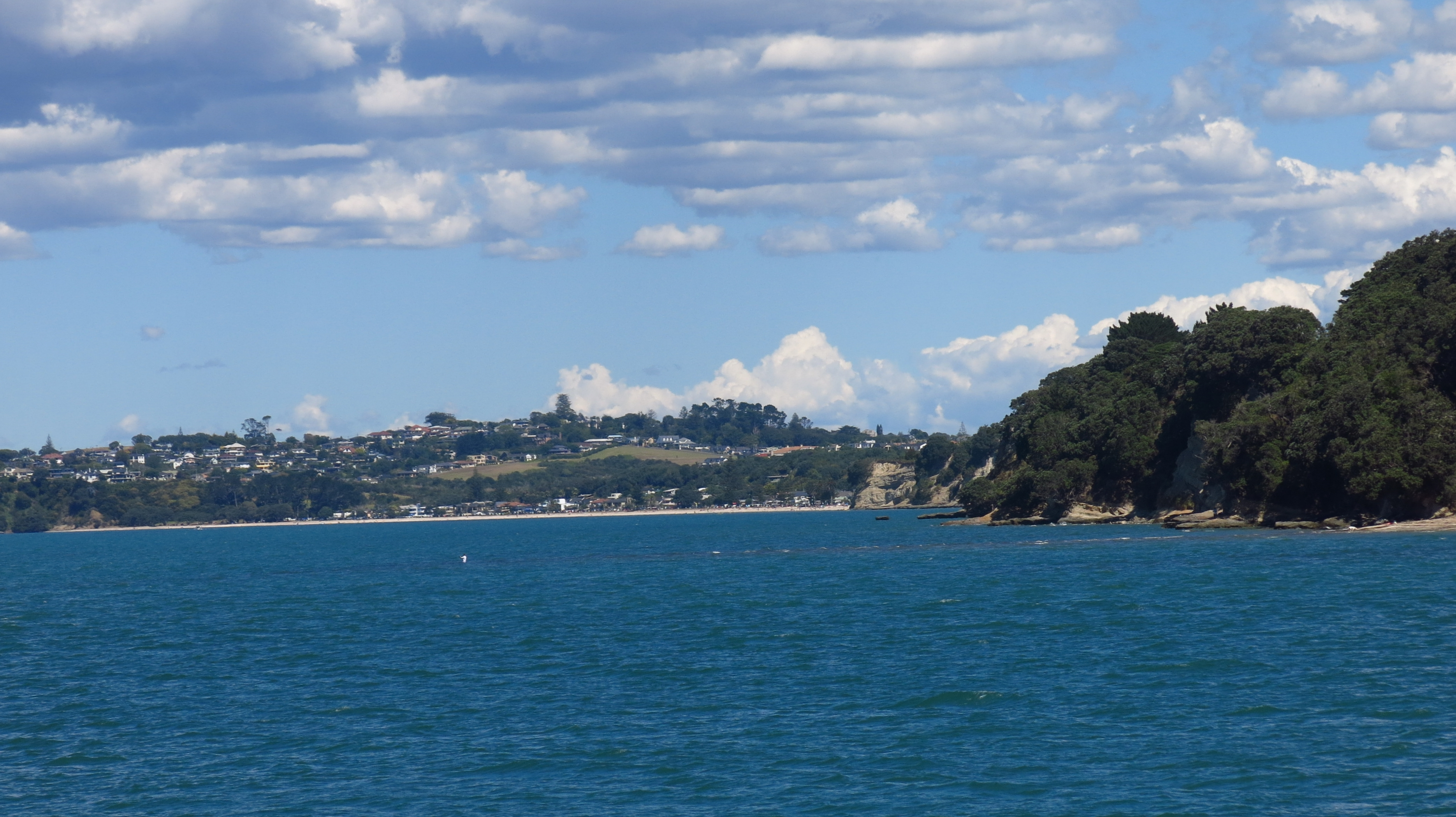
- Mellons Bay
- Interactive map of Mellons Bay
- Coordinates: 36.886461°S 174.928342°E
- Country: New Zealand
- City: Auckland
- Local authority: Auckland Council
- Electoral ward: Howick ward
- Local board: Howick Local Board

Area
  - Land: 168 ha (420 acres)

Population (June 2025)
  - Total: 4,170
  - Density: 2,480/km^{2} (6,430/sq mi)

Eastern Beach (2.2 km)		(Waitematā Harbour)
Half Moon Bay (2.3 km)	Mellons Bay
Highland Park (2.6 km)	Howick (1.2 km)	Cockle Bay (2.1 km)

Mellons Bay is a suburb of East Auckland. It is south of Eastern Beach and north of Howick.

== Geography ==
Mellons Bay is located on the eastern edges of metropolitan East Auckland along the Hauraki Gulf coast. and consists of two ridges joined by a wide steep gully facing east. The bay itself is located to the east of the suburb, and looks out towards the Tāmaki Strait and Waiheke Island.

== History ==
The traditional Ngāi Tai ki Tāmaki name for Mellons Bay was Okokino, referring to the bad gusts of winds that were hazards for waka travelling along the coast. The major European settlement in the area began in 1847, with the establishment of the Howick fencible settlement, a settlement of retired British Army soldiers intended to defend Auckland from potential attacks. Mellons Bay was named after the Irish William Mellon, who settled there around 1856. A seawall to combat erosion was constructed at Mellons Bay in 2016.

== Demographics ==
Mellons Bay covers 1.68 km^{2} (0.65 sq mi) and had an estimated population of 4,170 as of June 2025, with a population density of 2,482 people per km^{2}.

Historical population
Year	Pop.	±% p.a.
2006	3,594	—
2013	3,681	+0.34%
2018	4,017	+1.76%
2023	3,990	−0.13%

Mellons Bay had a population of 3,990 in the 2023 New Zealand census, a decrease of 27 people (−0.7%) since the 2018 census, and an increase of 309 people (8.4%) since the 2013 census. There were 1,950 males, 2,034 females and 6 people of other genders in 1,359 dwellings. 2.8% of people identified as LGBTIQ+. The median age was 44.3 years (compared with 38.1 years nationally). There were 699 people (17.5%) aged under 15 years, 687 (17.2%) aged 15 to 29, 1,854 (46.5%) aged 30 to 64, and 750 (18.8%) aged 65 or older.

People could identify as more than one ethnicity. The results were 65.6% European (Pākehā); 4.2% Māori; 1.4% Pasifika; 33.3% Asian; 1.9% Middle Eastern, Latin American and African New Zealanders (MELAA); and 2.0% other, which includes people giving their ethnicity as "New Zealander". English was spoken by 93.9%, Māori language by 0.5%, Samoan by 0.2%, and other languages by 30.8%. No language could be spoken by 0.8% (e.g. too young to talk). New Zealand Sign Language was known by 0.2%. The percentage of people born overseas was 45.5, compared with 28.8% nationally.

Religious affiliations were 33.5% Christian, 1.6% Hindu, 1.1% Islam, 2.0% Buddhist, 0.4% New Age, 0.1% Jewish, and 1.6% other religions. People who answered that they had no religion were 54.1%, and 6.2% of people did not answer the census question.

Of those at least 15 years old, 1,260 (38.3%) people had a bachelor's or higher degree, 1,389 (42.2%) had a post-high school certificate or diploma, and 642 (19.5%) people exclusively held high school qualifications. The median income was $49,200, compared with $41,500 nationally. 741 people (22.5%) earned over $100,000 compared to 12.1% nationally. The employment status of those at least 15 was that 1,605 (48.8%) people were employed full-time, 543 (16.5%) were part-time, and 57 (1.7%) were unemployed.

== Education ==
Mellons Bay School is a coeducational contributing primary school (years 1–8) with a roll of 404 as of March 2026.
