= Pakuranga Heights =

- Suburb
- Interactive map of Pakuranga Heights
- Coordinates: 36°54′58″S 174°53′21″E
- Country: New Zealand
- City: Auckland
- Local authority: Auckland Council
- Electoral ward: Howick ward
- Local board: Howick Local Board

Area
  - Land: 353 ha (870 acres)

Population (June 2025)
  - Total: 10,140
  - Density: 2,870/km^{2} (7,440/sq mi)

(Tamaki River), Panmure	Sunnyhills	Highland Park
Pakuranga	Pakuranga Heights	Botany Downs
(Tamaki River), Ōtāhuhu	East Tāmaki	Burswood

Pakuranga Heights is an Auckland suburb.

== Demographics ==
Pakuranga Heights covers 3.53 km^{2} (1.36 sq mi) and had an estimated population of 10,140 as of June 2025, with a population density of 2,873 people per km^{2}.

Historical population
Year	Pop.	±% p.a.
2006	8,577	—
2013	8,802	+0.37%
2018	9,234	+0.96%
2023	9,180	−0.12%

Pakuranga Heights had a population of 9,180 in the 2023 New Zealand census, a decrease of 54 people (−0.6%) since the 2018 census, and an increase of 378 people (4.3%) since the 2013 census. There were 4,662 males, 4,485 females and 30 people of other genders in 2,826 dwellings. 3.1% of people identified as LGBTIQ+. The median age was 35.1 years (compared with 38.1 years nationally). There were 1,875 people (20.4%) aged under 15 years, 1,938 (21.1%) aged 15 to 29, 4,311 (47.0%) aged 30 to 64, and 1,056 (11.5%) aged 65 or older.

People could identify as more than one ethnicity. The results were 40.9% European (Pākehā); 13.0% Māori; 15.1% Pasifika; 42.5% Asian; 3.0% Middle Eastern, Latin American and African New Zealanders (MELAA); and 2.7% other, which includes people giving their ethnicity as "New Zealander". English was spoken by 87.4%, Māori language by 2.3%, Samoan by 3.4%, and other languages by 37.5%. No language could be spoken by 2.7% (e.g. too young to talk). New Zealand Sign Language was known by 0.4%. The percentage of people born overseas was 48.1, compared with 28.8% nationally.

Religious affiliations were 35.2% Christian, 4.0% Hindu, 3.5% Islam, 0.8% Māori religious beliefs, 2.5% Buddhist, 0.4% New Age, 0.2% Jewish, and 2.3% other religions. People who answered that they had no religion were 44.8%, and 6.7% of people did not answer the census question.

Of those at least 15 years old, 2,007 (27.5%) people had a bachelor's or higher degree, 3,108 (42.5%) had a post-high school certificate or diploma, and 2,196 (30.1%) people exclusively held high school qualifications. The median income was $43,600, compared with $41,500 nationally. 717 people (9.8%) earned over $100,000 compared to 12.1% nationally. The employment status of those at least 15 was that 4,017 (55.0%) people were employed full-time, 837 (11.5%) were part-time, and 216 (3.0%) were unemployed.

Individual statistical areas
Name	Area (km^{2})	Population	Density (per km^{2})	Dwellings	Median age	Median income
Pakuranga Heights North West	0.76	2,739	3,604	870	34.6 years	$44,100
Pakuranga Heights East	1.79	3,006	1,679	918	36.0 years	$42,200
Pakuranga Heights South West	0.97	3,432	3,538	1,038	34.9 years	$44,800
New Zealand					38.1 years	$41,500

== Education ==
Elm Park School, Pakuranga Heights School and Riverhills School are coeducational contributing primary schools (years 1–6) with rolls of 495, 500 and 110 students, respectively. Rolls are as of July 2025.
