= Pōhutukawa Coast =

Region of Auckland, New Zealand

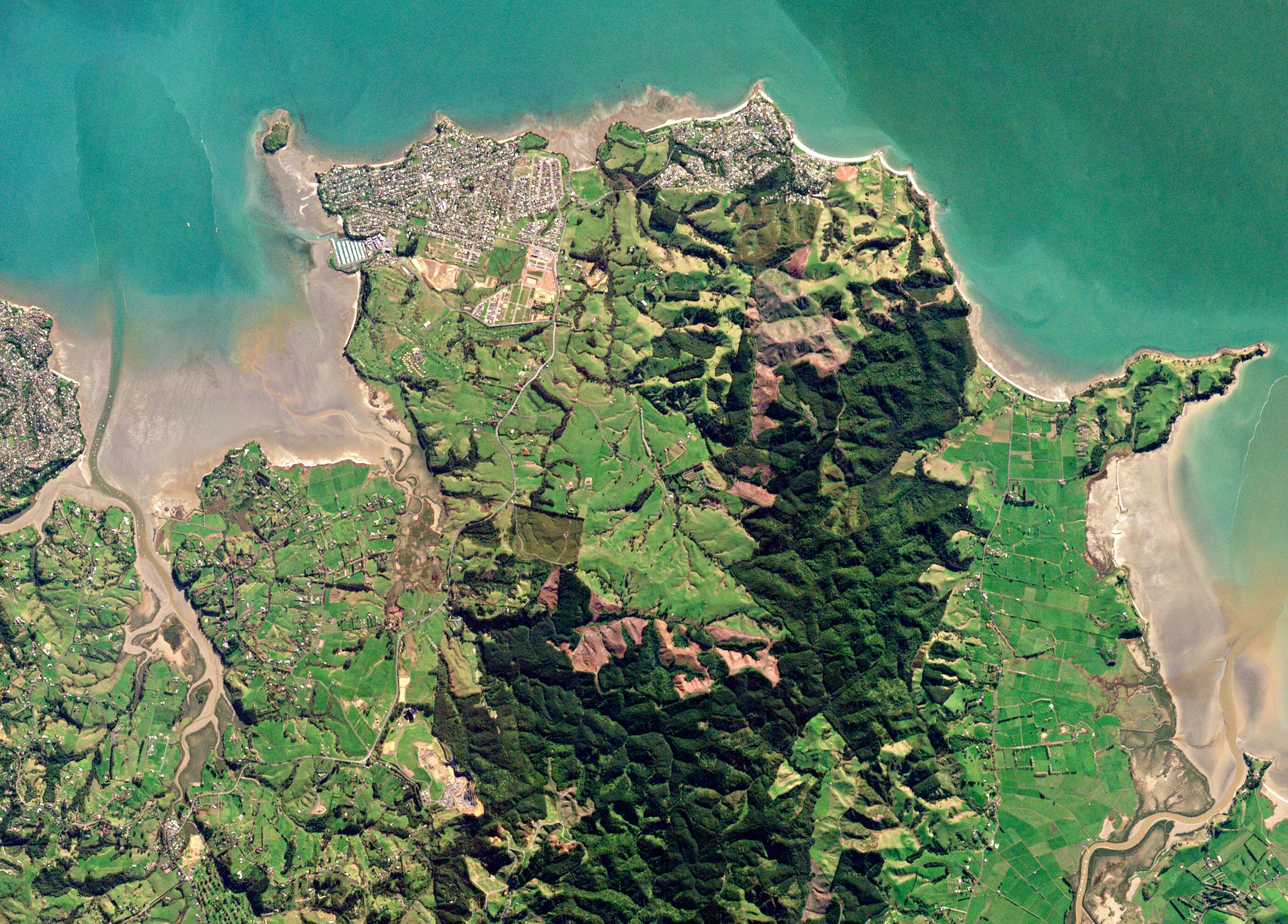
- The Pōhutukawa Coast captured by a Planet Labs satellite in 2016

- Location in New Zealand
- Coordinates: 36°53′S 175°01′E
- Country: New Zealand
- Island: North Island
- Region: Auckland Region

Area
  - Total: 82.06 km^{2} (31.68 sq mi)

Population
  - Estimate (June 2025): 12,375
- Time zone: UTC+12 (NZST)
  - Summer (DST): UTC+13 (NZDT)
- Area code: 09

The Pōhutukawa Coast is an area of the Auckland Region in New Zealand. The area covers settlemnts south of the Tāmaki Strait: Whitford, Beachlands, and Maraetai. The area was traditionally known as Maraetai, and is within the rohe of Ngāi Tai ki Tāmaki. In the 1920s, seasonal holiday communities developed in the area, which became permanent residential towns by the 1950s.

== Definition and etymology ==
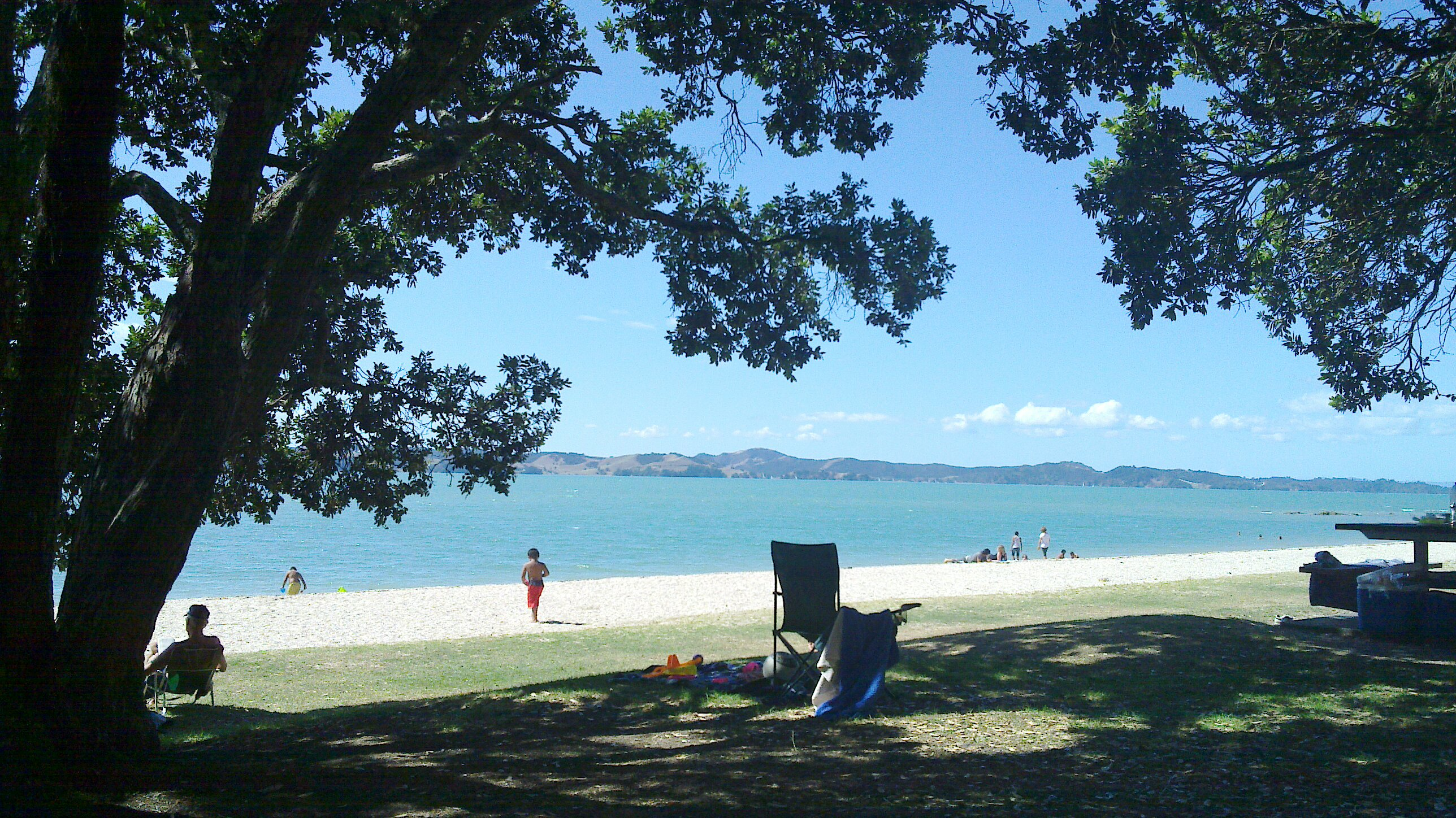
The area is named after the pōhutukawa trees found along the coast

The Pōhutukawa Coast includes the settlements of Whitford, Beachlands, and Maraetai. It covers the Whakakaiwhara Peninsula, the location of Duder Regional Park. Kawakawa Bay is occasionally included in the definition, and sometimes locations as far as the Firth of Thames, such as Ōrere Point and Tāpapakanga Regional Park.

One of the earliest uses of the name Pōhutukawa Coast was when the Maraetai community newsletter, the Town Crier, rebranded as the newspaper the Pohutukawa Coast Times in August 1992. This was joined in July 2002 when the Whitford Rotary Club was renamed the Pohutukawa Coast Rotary, and the Pohutukawa Coast Community Association, which formed in October 2004. The coast is named after the pōhutukawa found along the coastline.

== Geography ==
The Pōhutukawa Coast is primarily formed from Jurassic age Waipapa Group greywacke, as well as Holocene alluvial deposits. The coast borders the Tāmaki Strait, an area of the Hauraki Gulf sheltered by Waiheke and Ponui islands. Motukaraka Island is a flat topped island 500 metres off the coast from Beachlands. It is composed of Waitemata sandstone, and formed between one and two million years ago as a section of a river valley. The flat top of the island is an uplifted terrace which has undergone intertidal erosion.

Three estuarine drowned river valleys can be found to the west of the coast, the Mangemangeroa Creek, Tūranga Creek and Waikopua Creek. These three estuaries are major habitats for migratory and native New Zealand birdlife.

The east coast is the Whakakaiwhara Peninsula, which is the location of Duder Regional Park. Prior to human settlement, the Whakakaiwhara Peninsula was heavily forested with Beilschmiedia tawa, Beilschmiedia tarairi (taraire), pūriri, karaka and kauri trees.

== Human context ==
=== Māori history ===
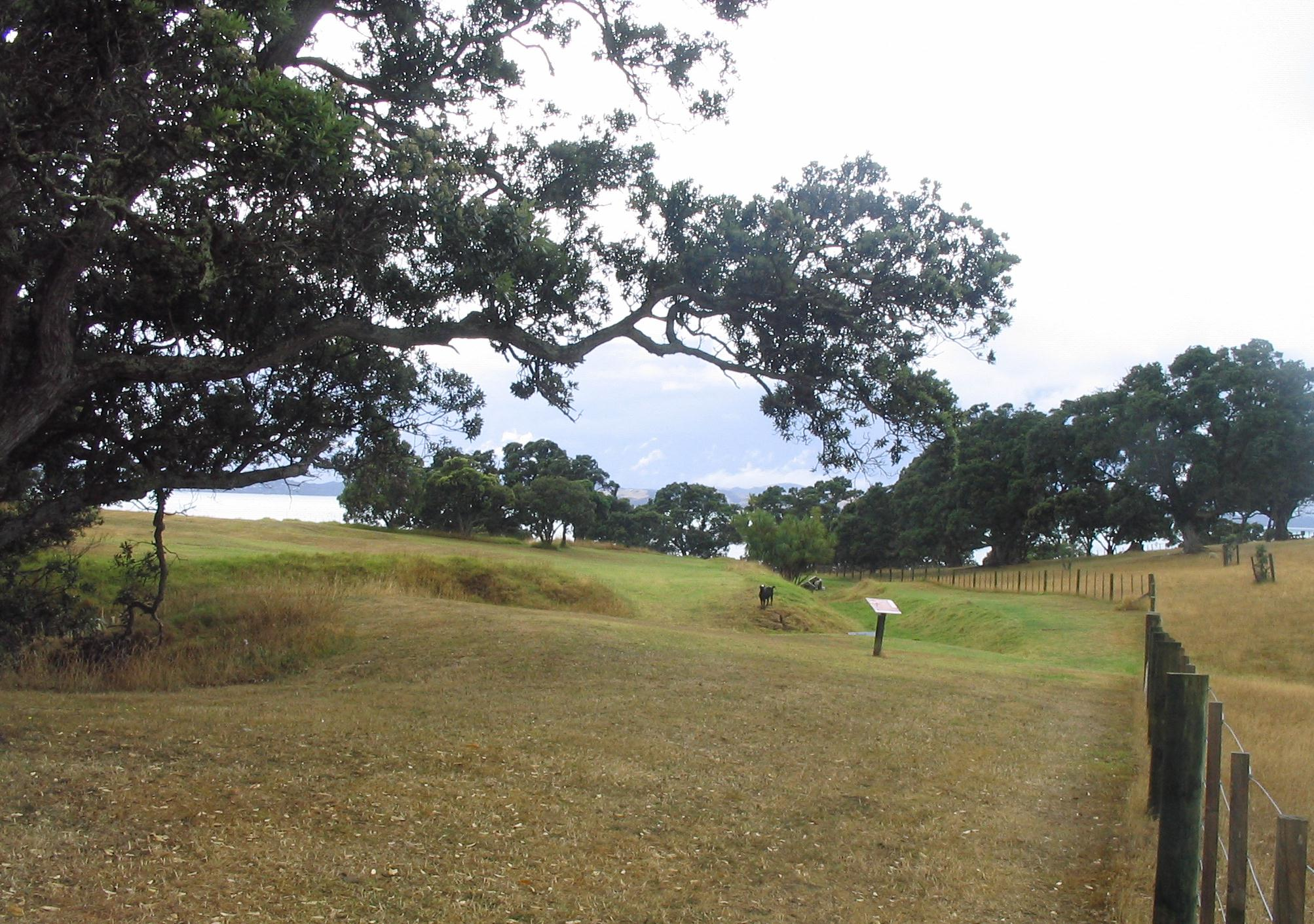
Former pā site at Ōmana Regional Park

The Pōhutukawa Coast was visited by the Tainui migratory waka around the year 1300. The waka landed at Tūranga Creek, tethered to a volcanic rock in the shape of a man. This gave rise to the name of the creek, which means "Anchorage". Tainui followers of Manawatere, who identified as Ngā Oho, decided to settle the area between the Pōhutukawa Coast and Tūwakamana (Cockle Bay). Ngāi Tai ki Tāmaki, the mana whenua of the area, descend from these early settlers. Ngāi Tai ki Tāmaki traditional stories talk about the land already being occupied by the supernatural Tūrehu people, and many place names in the area reference Tūrehu figures, such as Hinerangi and Manawatere.

The name Maraetai is a traditional name for the Tāmaki Strait, meaning "Marae Enclosed by the Tides", referring to how the sheltered ocean of the strait acted like a flat marae ātea (marae entrance courtyard). The name traditionally referred to the wider area between Motukaraka Island and the Wairoa River. Tūranga is the traditional name for the wider area around Whitford and the Tūranga Creek. Ngāi Tai people lived in seasonal encampments between the Tāmaki River and Wairoa River, collecting seafood resources, cultivating crops such as kūmara and taro, snaring birds and processing karaka berries.

By the 1600s, Whakakaiwhara Pā and Te Oue Pā to the south of the Whakakaiwhara Peninsula were focal points of Ngāi Tai life, where the rangatira of the iwi were based. By the 1800s, after European contact, the rangatira of Ngāi Tai were based at Umupuia (Duders Beach). During the 1820s, most members of Ngāi Tai fled to the Waikato due to the threats of the Musket Wars, however by the 1830s many had returned.

=== Early European history ===
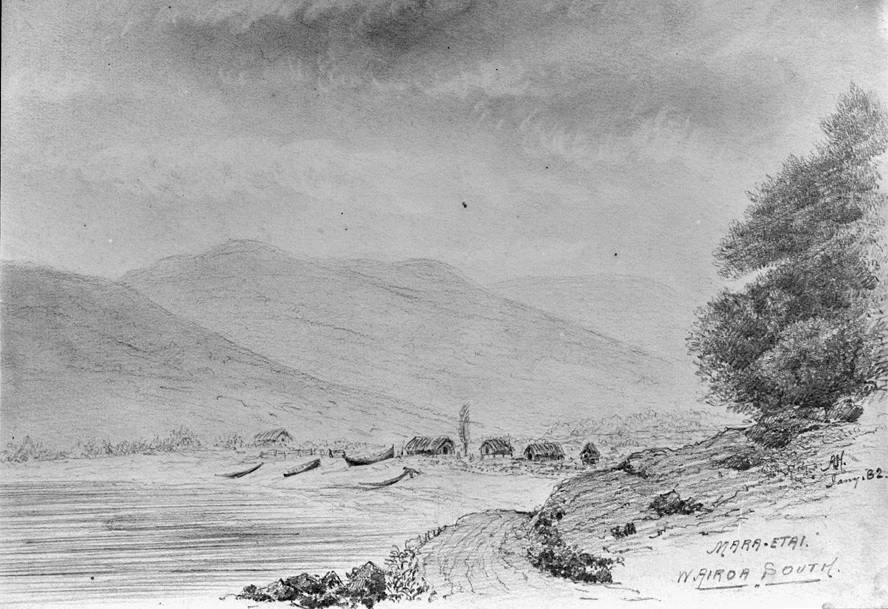
Pencil sketch of Umupuia in 1882

English Missionary William Thomas Fairburn first visited the area in 1833. In 1836, Fairburn brokered a land sale between Tāmaki Māori chiefs, Pōtatau Te Wherowhero and Turia of Ngāti Te Rau, covering the majority of modern-day South Auckland, East Auckland and the Pōhutukawa Coast. The sale was envisioned as a way to end hostilities in the area, but it is unclear what the chiefs understood or consented to. Māori continued to live in the area, unchanged by this sale.

Fairburn established the Maraetai Mission Station in 1837, where he taught reading, writing and spread Christianity among Ngāi Tai and Ngāti Pāoa. Fairburn resigned from the mission in 1841, and the mission continued on Wiremu Hoete, until late 1843. Many Ngāi Tai and Ngāti Pāoa lived at the mission, and the farm surrounding the mission became one of the first farms in Auckland. Fairburn's Purchase was investigated by the New Zealand Land Commission in 1841 and 1842 and found to be excessive and reduced in size. The disallowed parts of his purchase were not returned to Ngāi Tai, however in 1854 a reserve was created for Ngāi Tai between the eastern shores of the Wairoa River and Umupuia. As a part of this arrangement, Ngāi Tai agreed not to settle elsewhere in the region, which meant that Ngāi Tai's tradition of seasonal settlement could not be continued.

The first European settlers arrived in the area in the 1840s and 1850s. In 1842, Ngeungeu, daughter of the Ngāi Tai chief Tara Te Irirangi, moved back to Umupuia with her family, after her husband, Scottish mariner Thomas Maxwell in the Bay of Islands, died. In September 1863 during the Invasion of the Waikato, the Ngāi Tai village of Ōtau near Clevedon was attacked by the British army, and the village was evacuated, living in communities at the river's mouth. For the remainder of the war, Ngāi Tai were designated as a "friendly" people by the Crown, and remained neutral in the fighting. After the Native Lands Act of 1865, the Native Land Court confiscated many Ngāi Tai lands. The remaining land was individuated, slowly sold on to European farmers.

The first local government in the area was the Turanga Highway District, which began operating in 1866 around Whitford, followed by the Maraetai Highway District in 1875. From 1869 until the 1920s, the Nathan family at Whitford operated a large ostrich farm. Other farms grew oats, hay, wheat, potatoes for the Auckland market, and other industries developed, including brickworks and mines.

Ngāi Tai focused life at Umupuia for the 19th Century, where a flax mill existed. In the early 20th century, a fire burnt down the mill and the meeting house, Hārata Kīngi.

=== Urban development ===
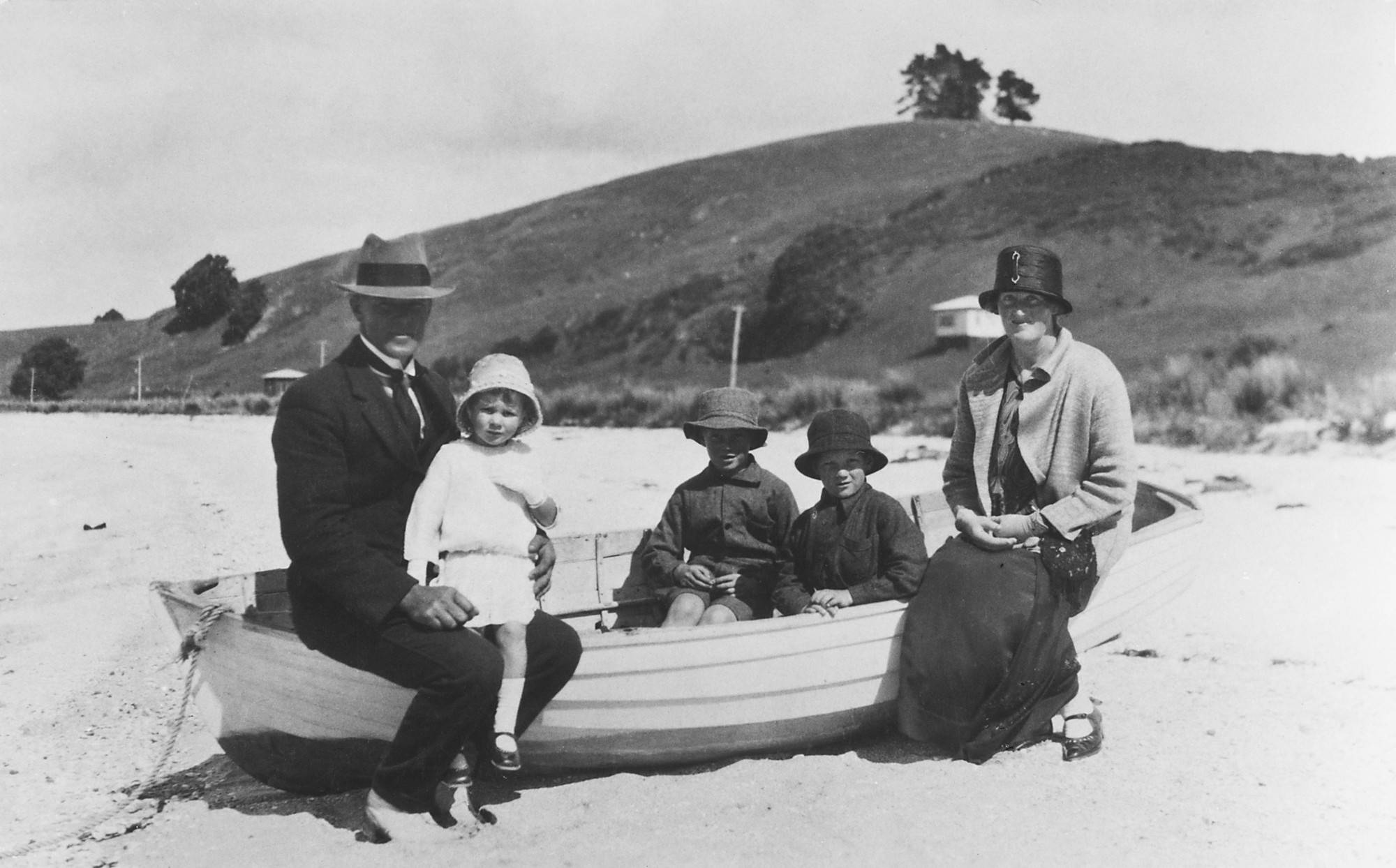
A family enjoying a day at Maraetai Beach in the 1920s

By the early 20th Century, the Pōhutukawa Coast had become a popular spot for picnics and camping. Beachlands and Maraetai were subdivided in the 1920s, growing into holiday communities. In 1929, the first bus service began, linking Maraetai, Beachlands and Whitford to Auckland. From the 1950s to the early 1970s, Beachlands and Maraetai grew significantly, transitioning from seasonal holiday towns to permanent residential communities.

The Pine Harbour marina was constructed in 1988, becoming a major transport hub for the area, linking the Pōhutukawa Coast to Auckland by ferry. The Umupuia Marae was officially reopened in November 1990, and in 1997 the Formosa Golf Club opened.

Between 2017 and the 2030s, the Pōhutukawa Coast Trail, a series of walking tracks linking the communities of the Pōhutukawa Coast, will be constructed. In 2022, residents of the Pōhutukawa Coast petitioned the government to build a high school for the area.

== Demographics ==
Pōhutukawa Coast covers 82.06 km^{2} (31.68 sq mi) (Note: In this section, Pōhutukawa Coast is treated as including Beachlands, Maraetai and Whitford and the parts of Turanga and Kawakawa Bay-Orere listed in the table of individual statistical areas.) and had an estimated population of 12,375 as of June 2025, with a population density of 151 people per km^{2}.

Historical population
Year	Pop.	±% p.a.
2006	6,387	—
2013	7,899	+3.08%
2018	9,750	+4.30%
2023	11,712	+3.73%
The 2006 population is for a smaller area of 76.32 km^{2}. Source:

Pōhutukawa Coast had a population of 11,712 in the 2023 New Zealand census, an increase of 1,962 people (20.1%) since the 2018 census, and an increase of 3,813 people (48.3%) since the 2013 census. There were 5,805 males, 5,871 females and 39 people of other genders in 3,951 dwellings. 2.2% of people identified as LGBTIQ+. There were 2,412 people (20.6%) aged under 15 years, 1,857 (15.9%) aged 15 to 29, 5,742 (49.0%) aged 30 to 64, and 1,704 (14.5%) aged 65 or older.

People could identify as more than one ethnicity. The results were 89.1% European (Pākehā); 9.5% Māori; 3.3% Pasifika; 7.7% Asian; 1.1% Middle Eastern, Latin American and African New Zealanders (MELAA); and 2.5% other, which includes people giving their ethnicity as "New Zealander". English was spoken by 97.3%, Māori language by 1.2%, Samoan by 0.3%, and other languages by 12.6%. No language could be spoken by 1.8% (e.g. too young to talk). New Zealand Sign Language was known by 0.3%. The percentage of people born overseas was 30.7, compared with 28.8% nationally.

Religious affiliations were 31.3% Christian, 1.1% Hindu, 0.6% Islam, 0.2% Māori religious beliefs, 0.5% Buddhist, 0.2% New Age, 0.2% Jewish, and 1.6% other religions. People who answered that they had no religion were 57.4%, and 7.1% of people did not answer the census question.

Of those at least 15 years old, 2,787 (30.0%) people had a bachelor's or higher degree, 4,851 (52.2%) had a post-high school certificate or diploma, and 1,650 (17.7%) people exclusively held high school qualifications. 2,427 people (26.1%) earned over $100,000 compared to 12.1% nationally. The employment status of those at least 15 was that 5,274 (56.7%) people were employed full-time, 1,344 (14.5%) were part-time, and 198 (2.1%) were unemployed.

Individual statistical areas
Name	Area (km^{2})	Population	Density (per km^{2})	Dwellings	Median age	Median income
Beachlands-Pine Harbour	8.82	7,797	884	2,616	40.5 years	$58,900
Maraetai	6.88	2,553	371	903	44.4 years	$58,400
Whitford	0.18	147	817	48	52.3 years	$61,200
7007024	1.80	165	92	57	52.2 years	$62,500 (Note: These smaller areas within Taranga statistical area do not have names in the census results, only numbers.)
7007025	2.08	138	66	36	46.8 years	$49,000
7007034	2.86	159	56	51	50.1 years	$58,800
7007035	2.40	150	63	48	43.2 years	$56,300
7031494	5.22	210	40	60	44.0 years	$58,600
7007071	21.29	105	5	33	45.1 years	$42,400
7031517	30.53	288	9	99	45.4 years	$54,300 (Note: This area on the western side of Kawakawa Bay-Orere statistical area does not have a name in the census results, only a number.)
New Zealand					38.1 years	$41,500

== Education ==
Beachlands School is a coeducational full primary school (years 1–8) with a roll of 617 as of July 2026. Maraetai Beach School is a coeducational full primary school (years 1–8) with a roll of 430 as of July 2026.

There are no colleges for students aged 13–18 in the area but there are free buses providing access to schools such as Howick College and Botany Downs Secondary College as well as special character schools such as Elim Christian College, Sancta Maria College, Saint Kentigern College and Star of the Sea primary school.

== Local government ==
The first local government in the area was the Turanga Highway District, which was designated in 1865 and began operating in 1866. Around Beachlands and Maraetai, the Maraetai Highway Board was first designated in 1867 and began operating in 1875. The Maraetai Road Board was absorbed into the Manukau County in 1914, followed by Turanga in 1917. On 22 November 1954, Beachlands was established as a county town within the Manukau County, followed by Maraetai on 1 April 1962. All areas of the Pōhutukawa Coast were merged into Manukau City in 1965. In November 2010, all cities and districts of the Auckland Region were amalgamated into a single body, governed by the Auckland Council.

The Pōhutukawa Coast is part of the Franklin local board area, who elects members of the Franklin Local Board. Residents of Whitford also elect the Franklin ward councillor, who sits on the Auckland Council.

== Bibliography ==
- La Roche, Alan (2011). Grey's Folly: A History of Howick, Pakuranga, Bucklands-Eastern Beaches, East Tamaki, Whitford, Beachlands and Maraetai. Auckland: Tui Vale Productions. ISBN 978-0-473-18547-3. OCLC 1135039710. Wikidata Q118286377.
