= Magazine Bay =

Magazine Bay may refer to:

- Magazine Bay (Auckland), bay on the Pōhutukawa Coast in the Auckland region of New Zealand
- Magazine Bay (Canterbury), bay in Lyttelton Harbour / Whakaraupō in the Canterbury region of New Zealand
