= Maraetai =

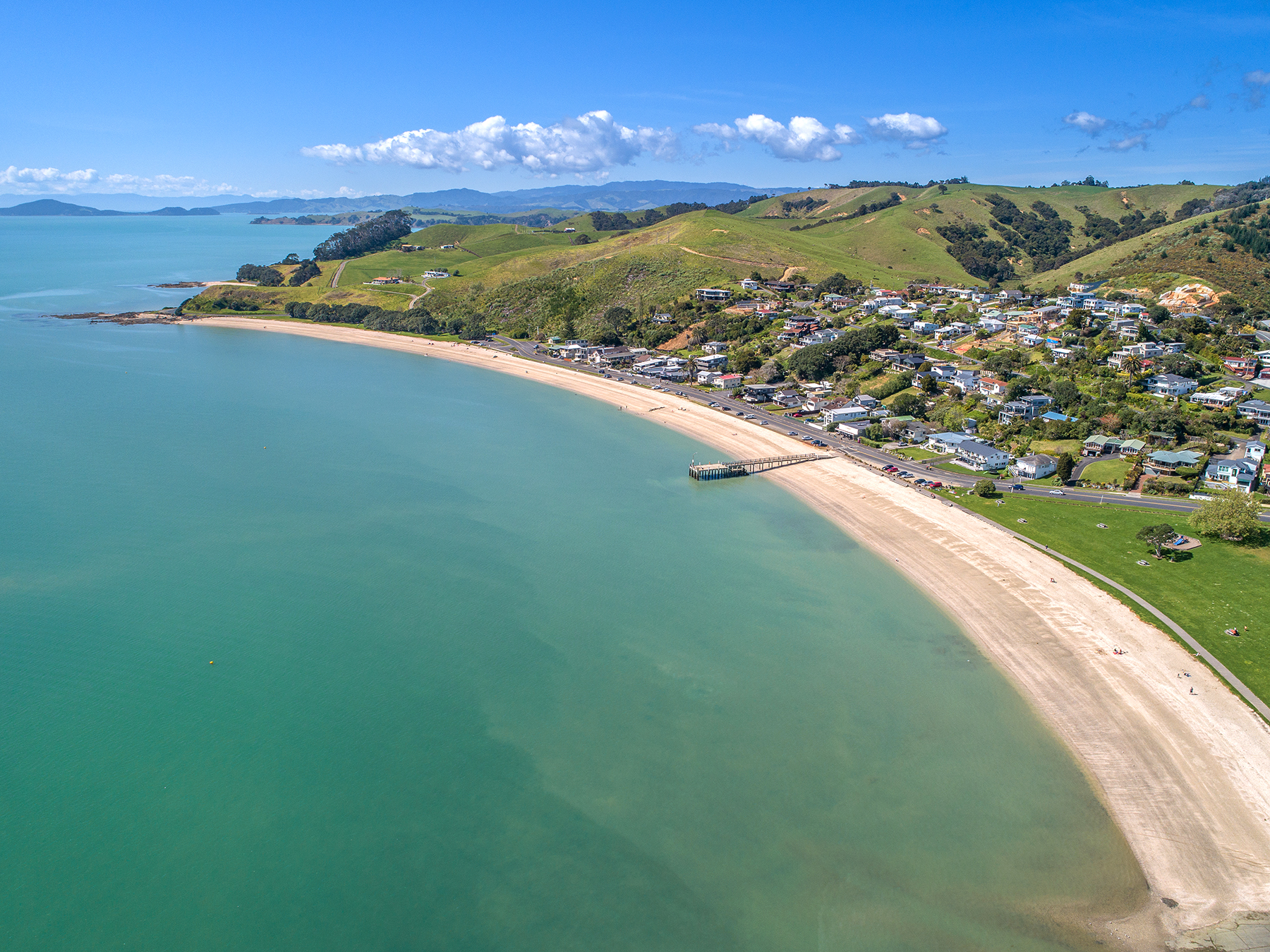
- Aerial overview of Maraetai beach, showing township and pier
- Interactive map of Maraetai
- Coordinates: 36.881°S 175.042°E
- Country: New Zealand
- Region: Auckland Region
- Ward: Franklin ward
- Board: Franklin Local Board
- Electorates: Papakura; Hauraki-Waikato

Government
  - Territorial Authority: Auckland Council
  - Mayor of Auckland: Wayne Brown
  - Papakura MP: Vacant
  - Hauraki-Waikato MP: Hana-Rawhiti Maipi-Clarke

Area
  - Total: 6.88 km^{2} (2.66 sq mi)

Population (June 2025)
  - Total: 2,660
  - Density: 387/km^{2} (1,000/sq mi)

Maraetai is a coastal town to the east of Auckland in New Zealand, on the Pōhutukawa Coast. Part of the traditional rohe of Ngāi Tai Ki Tāmaki, the area developed into a coastal holiday community in the early 20th Century.

== Geography ==
Maraetai is located adjacent to the Tāmaki Strait, in the Hauraki Gulf of New Zealand, 24 kilometres east of the Auckland City Centre. Maraetai has a number of bays and beaches, including Omana Beach, Te Pene Beach, Ohinerangi Beach, Waiomanu Beach and Magazine Bay. The closest town, Beachlands, lies approximately 4 kilometres to the west.

== History ==
=== Māori history ===
The Pōhutukawa Coast was visited by the Tainui migratory waka around the year 1300. Tainui followers of Manawatere, who identified as Ngā Oho, decided to settle the area between the Pōhutukawa Coast and Tūwakamana (Cockle Bay). Ngāi Tai ki Tāmaki, the mana whenua of the area, descend from these early settlers. Ngāi Tai ki Tāmaki traditional stories talk about the land already being occupied by the supernatural Tūrehu people, and many place names in the area reference Tūrehu figures, such as Hinerangi and Manawatere.

The name Maraetai is a traditional name for the Tāmaki Strait meaning "Marae Enclosed by the Tides", referring to how the sheltered ocean of the strait acted like a flat marae ātea (marae entrance courtyard). The name traditionally referred to the wider area between Motukaraka Island and the Wairoa River. Traditional names associated with modern Maraetai include Ōmanawatere, the name of Manawatere's pā and kāinga, Pōhaturoa, the name of the western Maraetai Beach as far as the Ōhinerangi stone, and Papawhitu, the name of the headland pā at modern Maraetai Point. Maraetai was a customary food gathering area, and around 200 people lives at the Papawhitu Pā, established in the 16th century.

When William Thomas Fairburn visited the area in 1833, it was mostly unoccupied due to the events of the Musket Wars, as most members of Ngāi Tai had fled to temporary refuge in the Waikato. In 1836, Fairburn purchased 40,000 acres between Ōtāhuhu and Umupuia (Duders Beach), including much of the catchment of the Wairoa River. Fairburn established a mission at Maraetai in 1837, where he taught reading, writing and spread Christianity among Ngāi Tai and Ngāti Pāoa. Fairburn resigned from the mission in 1841, and the mission was continued on Wiremu Hoete, until late 1843. Many Ngāi Tai and Ngāti Pāoa lived at the mission, and the farm surrounding the mission became one of the first farms in Auckland.

In 1851, Welsh farmer Thomas Eckford bought 368 acres from Fairburn around Maraetai as farmland, and the area was a site for kauri logging. In 1854, a portion of Fairburn's purchase between Maraetai Beach and Umupuia was designated as a reserve for Ngāi Tai. In September 1863 during the Invasion of the Waikato, the Ngāi Tai village of Ōtau near Clevedon was attacked by the British army, and the village was evacuated, living in communities at the river's mouth. For the remainder of the war, Ngāi Tai were designated as a "friendly" people by the Crown, and remained neutral in the fighting. After the Native Lands Act of 1865, the Native Land Court confiscated many Ngāi Tai lands. The remaining land was individuated, slowly sold on to European farmers. In 1877, the farmer Thomas Eckford sold his farm to George Couldrey.

=== Suburban development ===
The area was predominantly rural and sparsely populated in the 19th Century, and by the early 20th Century became a popular spot for picnics and camping. The Maraetai Highway District was established in 1875, and the first school opened in 1880. In the 1920s the area was subdivided. Sections of the Maraetai Beach Estate are advertised for sale in 1923, followed by the Omana Beach Estate in 1924. The Maraetai Hall was built in a single day on Labour Day 1926 as a community effort, and in 1929 the first bus service began, linking Maraetai, Beachlands and Whitford to Auckland.

Suburban housing in Maraetai developed significantly in the 1960s and early 1970s. Maraetai's residents do not use city mains water and instead must use water tanks and bore water. Many residents prefer it to be kept this way to maintain the town's rural aspect. Maraetai's beaches are popular destinations for other Aucklanders and are often crowded in the summer months.

== Demographics ==
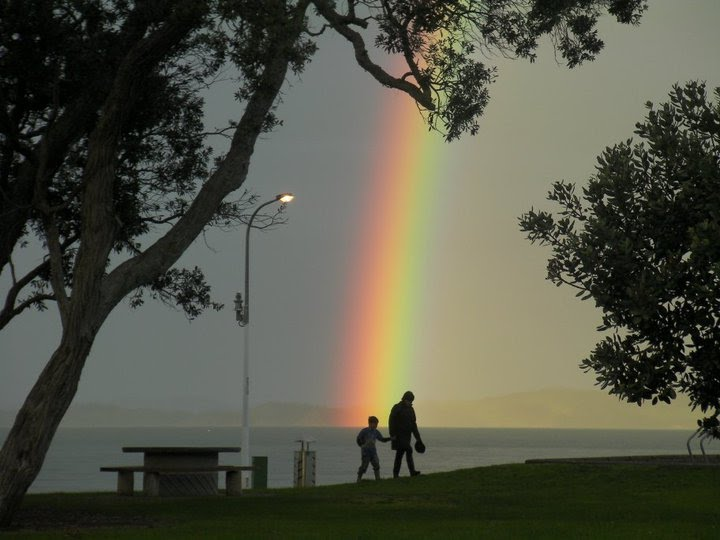
Rainbow after sun breaks through a heavy shower at Maraetai Beach.

Stats NZ describes Maraetai as a rural settlement. It covers 6.88 km^{2} (2.66 sq mi) and had an estimated population of 2,660 as of June 2025, with a population density of 387 people per km^{2}.

Historical population
Year	Pop.	±% p.a.
2006	1,863	—
2013	2,199	+2.40%
2018	2,346	+1.30%
2023	2,553	+1.71%

Maraetai had a population of 2,553 in the 2023 New Zealand census, an increase of 207 people (8.8%) since the 2018 census, and an increase of 354 people (16.1%) since the 2013 census. There were 1,254 males, 1,287 females and 15 people of other genders in 903 dwellings. 2.2% of people identified as LGBTIQ+. The median age was 44.4 years (compared with 38.1 years nationally). There were 471 people (18.4%) aged under 15 years, 390 (15.3%) aged 15 to 29, 1,284 (50.3%) aged 30 to 64, and 408 (16.0%) aged 65 or older.

People could identify as more than one ethnicity. The results were 91.4% European (Pākehā); 9.4% Māori; 3.2% Pasifika; 5.2% Asian; 0.8% Middle Eastern, Latin American and African New Zealanders (MELAA); and 2.8% other, which includes people giving their ethnicity as "New Zealander". English was spoken by 97.6%, Māori language by 1.4%, Samoan by 0.1%, and other languages by 11.5%. No language could be spoken by 1.6% (e.g. too young to talk). New Zealand Sign Language was known by 0.2%. The percentage of people born overseas was 29.7, compared with 28.8% nationally.

Religious affiliations were 33.0% Christian, 1.2% Hindu, 0.6% Islam, 0.2% Māori religious beliefs, 0.2% Buddhist, 0.2% New Age, 0.1% Jewish, and 1.2% other religions. People who answered that they had no religion were 56.1%, and 7.4% of people did not answer the census question.

Of those at least 15 years old, 645 (31.0%) people had a bachelor's or higher degree, 1,089 (52.3%) had a post-high school certificate or diploma, and 348 (16.7%) people exclusively held high school qualifications. The median income was $58,400, compared with $41,500 nationally. 540 people (25.9%) earned over $100,000 compared to 12.1% nationally. The employment status of those at least 15 was that 1,134 (54.5%) people were employed full-time, 318 (15.3%) were part-time, and 48 (2.3%) were unemployed.

== Landmarks and features ==
- The Maraetai Walkway is a walking path that connects the Maraetai Wharf to Beachlands in the west, crossing the Te Puru Creek.
- Ōmana Regional Park is a regional park located between Maraetai and Beachlands

== Education ==
The first school in Maraetai opened in 1880. This school was later closed, and Maraetai Beach School was opened on 22 February 1958. It is a coeducational full primary school (years 1–8) with a roll of 430 as of July 2026.

== Local government ==
The first local government in the area was the Maraetai Highway Board, which was formed 26 September 1867 and began operating 7 October 1867. The board was absorbed into the Manukau County in 1914. On 1 April 1962, Maraetai was established as a county town within the Manukau County, which existed until the establishment of Manukau City in 1965. In November 2010, all cities and districts of the Auckland Region were amalgamated into a single body, governed by the Auckland Council.

Maraetai is part of the Franklin local board area, who elects members of the Franklin Local Board. Residents of Maraetai also elect the Franklin ward councillor, who sits on the Auckland Council.

== Bibliography ==
- La Roche, Alan (2011). Grey's Folly: A History of Howick, Pakuranga, Bucklands-Eastern Beaches, East Tamaki, Whitford, Beachlands and Maraetai. Auckland: Tui Vale Productions. ISBN 978-0-473-18547-3. OCLC 1135039710. Wikidata Q118286377.
