= Beachlands, New Zealand =

Beachlands
- Suburb
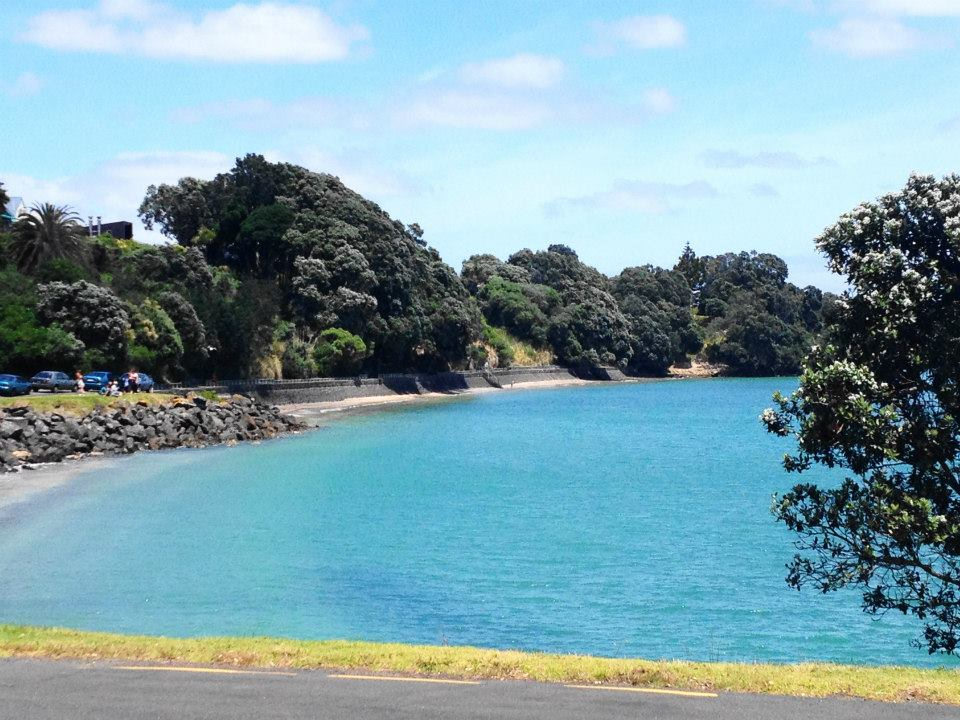
- Sunkist Bay in Beachlands, New Zealand
- Interactive map of Beachlands
- Coordinates: 36°53′S 175°00′E
- Country: New Zealand
- City: Auckland
- Local authority: Auckland Council
- Electoral ward: Franklin ward
- Local board: Franklin Local Board
- Established: 1920s

Area
  - Land: 882 ha (2,180 acres)

Population (June 2025)
  - Total: 8,330
  - Density: 944/km^{2} (2,450/sq mi)
- Ferry terminals: Pine Harbour Marina

Motukaraka Island	(Tāmaki Strait)	(Tāmaki Strait)
(Tamaki Strait)	Beachlands	Maraetai
(Tāmaki Strait)	Whitford	Clevedon

Beachlands is an outer suburb of Auckland, New Zealand, established in the 1920s, where development increased in the 1950s due to its popularity as a beach holiday destination. It is located on the Pōhutukawa Coast and in close proximity to Maraetai.

== Geography ==
Beachlands is located adjacent to the Tāmaki Strait, in the Hauraki Gulf of New Zealand, 20 kilometres east of the Auckland City Centre. Beachlands has a number of bays and beaches, including Sunkist Bay, Pohutukawa Bay, View Bay and Shelly Bay, and is west of the Ōmana Regional Park.

== History ==
=== Māori history ===
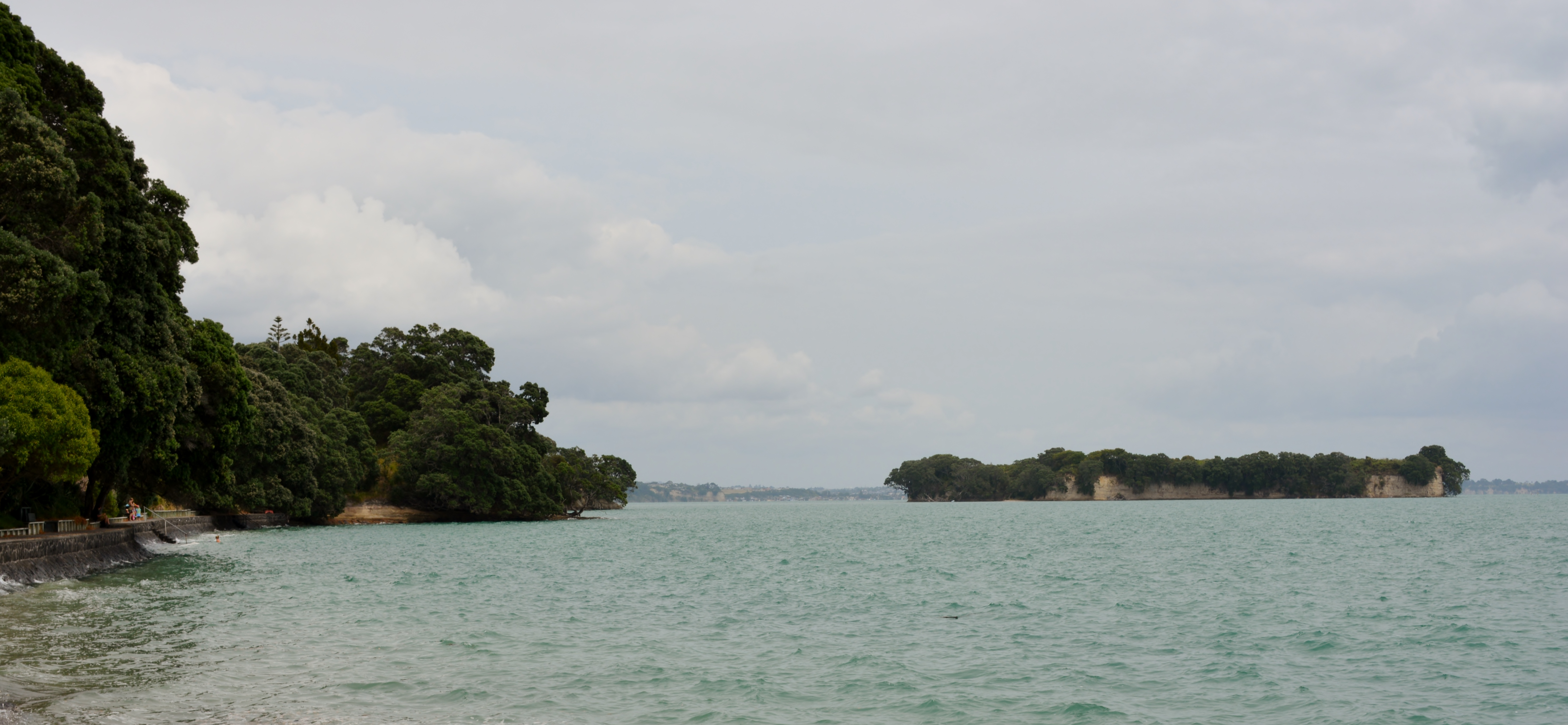
Motukaraka Island was famous for kūmara plantations

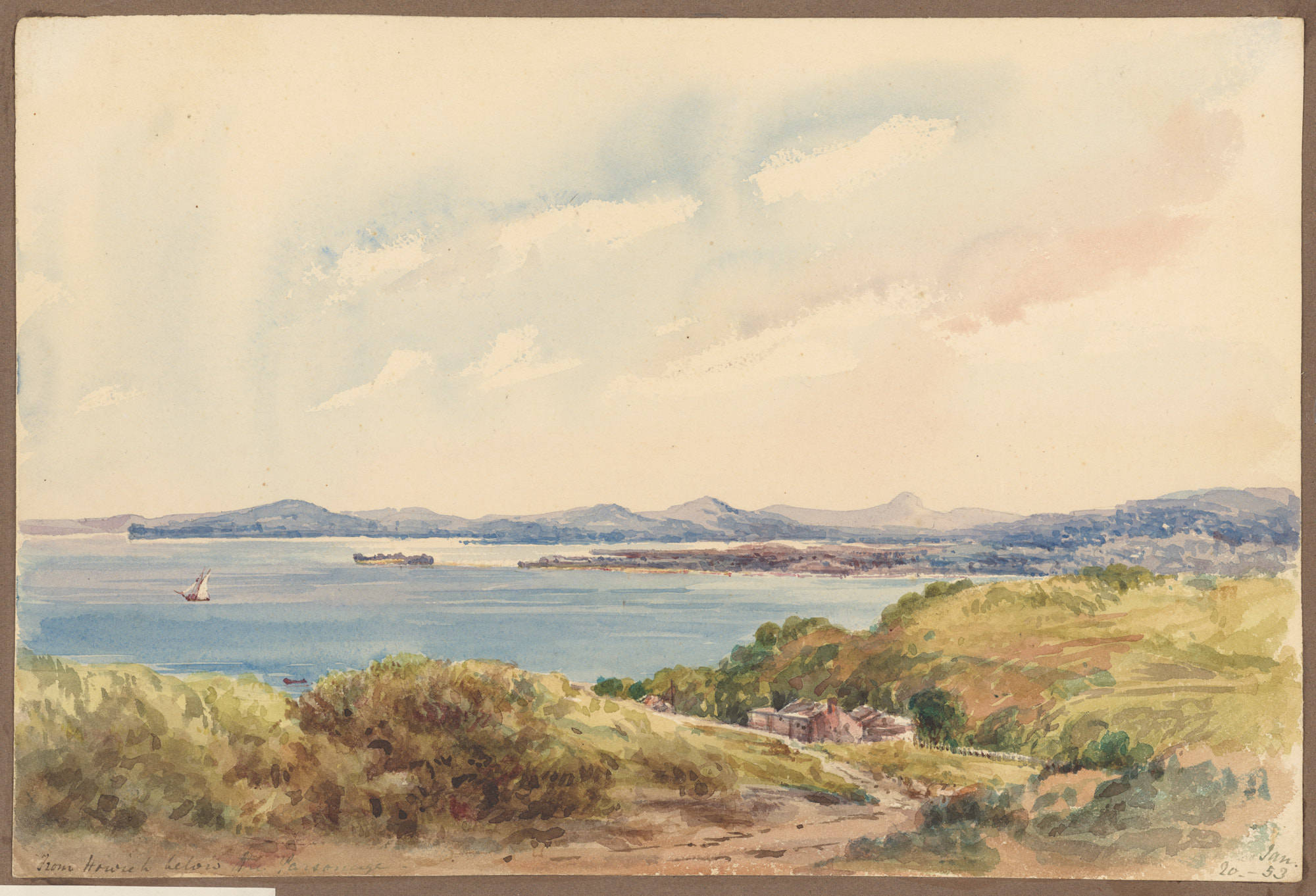
Watercolour by Caroline Harriet Abraham, depicting Motukaraka Island and Beachlands seen from Waipaparoa / Howick Beach

The Pōhutukawa Coast was visited by the Tainui migratory waka around the year 1300. Tainui followers of Manawatere, who identified as Ngā Oho, decided to settle the area between the Pōhutukawa Coast and Tūwakamana (Cockle Bay). Ngāi Tai ki Tāmaki, the mana whenua of the area, descend from these early settlers. Ngāi Tai ki Tāmaki traditional stories talk about the land already being occupied by the supernatural Tūrehu people, and many place names in the area reference Tūrehu figures, such as Hinerangi and Manawatere.

The traditional name for the Beachlands area is Kahawairahi, referring to how abundant kahawai fish were in the waters, and the inland area was called Kauriwhakiwhaki, and was an area where kauri wood was harvested to construct waka, and kauri gum for kapoa, a traditional chewing gum. The area was one of the most densely gardened and fished places in the Pōhutukawa Coast, and has a high concentration of archaeological middens, pits and terraces. The headland between Sunkist Bay and Shelly Bay was a fortified pā called Te Kawau. Motukaraka Island was famous for its kūmara plantations, and used to be a tied island, connected to the mainland by a narrow strip of sand. The waters around Motukaraka were known as an important shark fishing ground.

Kahawairahi was an important Ngāi Tai settlement into the early colonial era. European settlers noted Ngāi Tai drying fish at Kahawairahi in the 1860s. When William Thomas Fairburn visited the area in 1833, it was mostly unoccupied due to the events of the Musket Wars, as most members of Ngāi Tai had fled to temporary refuge in the Waikato. In 1836, Fairburn purchased 40,000 acres between Ōtāhuhu and Umupuia (Duders Beach), including much of the catchment of the Wairoa River. Fairburn's Purchase was investigated by the New Zealand Land Commission in 1841 and 1842 and found to be excessive and reduced in size. The disallowed parts of his purchase were not returned to Ngāi Tai, however in 1854 a reserve was created for Ngāi Tai between the eastern shores of the Wairoa River and Umupuia.

In September 1863 during the Invasion of the Waikato, the Ngāi Tai village of Ōtau near Clevedon was attacked by the British army, and the village was evacuated, living in communities at the river's mouth. For the remainder of the war, Ngāi Tai were designated as a "friendly" people by the Crown, and remained neutral in the fighting. After the Native Lands Act of 1865, the Native Land Court confiscated many Ngāi Tai lands. The remaining land was individuated, slowly sold on to European farmers.

=== Suburban development ===
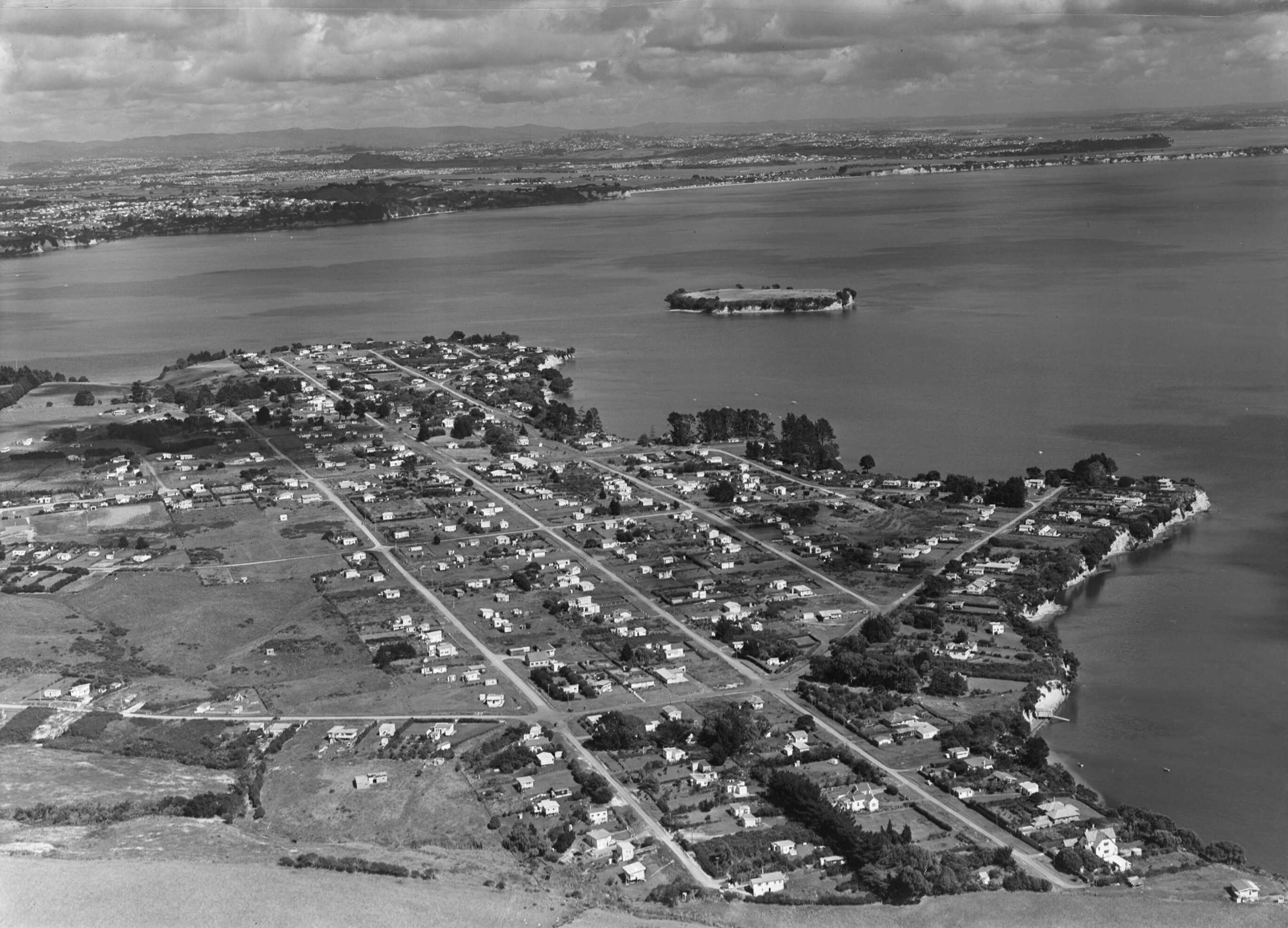
An aerial view of Beachlands in 1959

The Beachlands area was grassy farmland until 1922, when it was subdivided by Richard W. Kipplewhite. Beachlands was advertised as a "new marine garden suburb" of Auckland. Beachlands developed into a location for day-trips, with many people visiting from Auckland by ferry. A holiday community grew around Beachlands. In 1929, the first bus service began, linking Maraetai, Beachlands and Whitford to Auckland. In 1948, the Beachlands RSA Hall was constructed.

Beachlands grew significantly in the 1950s, developing from a holiday destination to a residential community. In the 1960s, property values in the Beachlands area plummeted as the area was the site of a proposed oil refinery, which was eventually constructed at Marsden Point near Whangārei. Pine Harbour was constructed in 1988, and the Formosa Golf Club opened in 1997. In 2017, the Pohutukawa Coast Shopping Centre opened in Beachlands, despite opposition from members of the community.

Many English migrants and increasing numbers of South Africans have moved into the area in recent years. Houses in old Beachlands often come with a quarter of an acre of land. The housing ranges from cliff top mansions to rambling and somewhat run down baches. The newer areas of Pine Harbour, Spinnaker Bay and Pony Park contain modern houses, generally with smaller gardens than in old Beachlands. District plan minimum size is 700 square metres for a section (piece of land), although some subdivisions were approved during a brief period which saw some in-fill housing (more sections in a given area).

While connected to Auckland's waste water reticulation, all the properties collect their own rain water. Some properties have tapped into the underlying aquifers fed from the adjacent Maraetai-Brookby range of hills. No potable rivers are utilised for potable water locally.

== Demographics ==
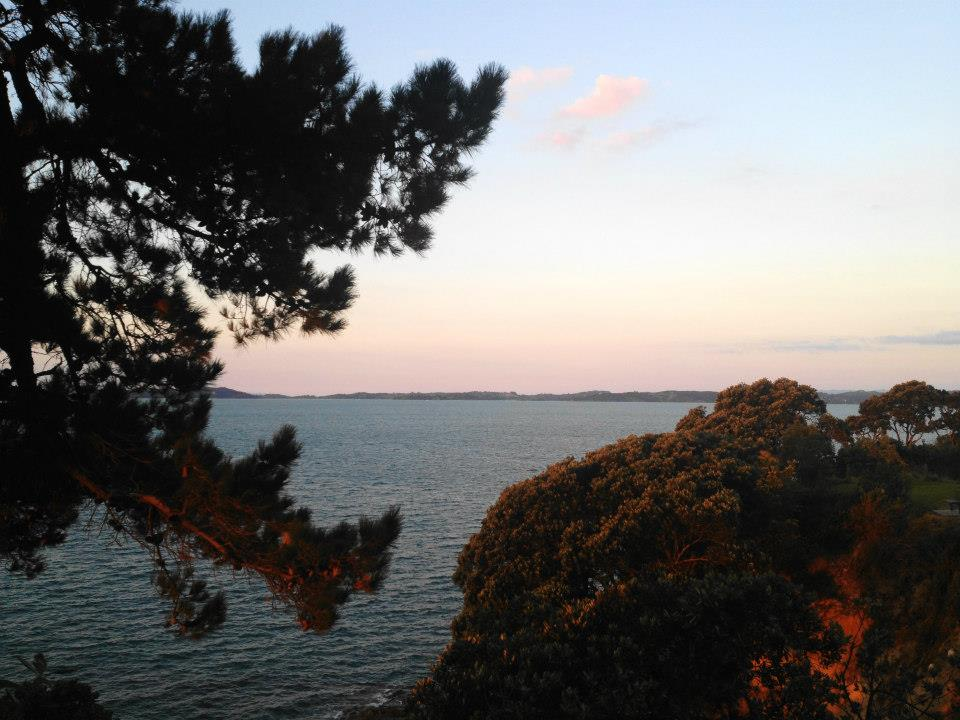
Cliffside on the bay near Beachlands

Beachlands is described by Statistics New Zealand as a small urban area, which it calls Beachlands-Pine Harbour. It covers 8.82 km^{2} (3.41 sq mi) and had an estimated population of 8,330 as of June 2025, with a population density of 944 people per km^{2}.

Historical population
Year	Pop.	±% p.a.
2006	3,417	—
2013	4,572	+4.25%
2018	6,261	+6.49%
2023	7,797	+4.49%

Beachlands-Pine Harbour had a population of 7,797 in the 2023 New Zealand census, an increase of 1,536 people (24.5%) since the 2018 census, and an increase of 3,225 people (70.5%) since the 2013 census. There were 3,867 males, 3,912 females and 18 people of other genders in 2,616 dwellings. 2.0% of people identified as LGBTIQ+. The median age was 40.5 years (compared with 38.1 years nationally). There were 1,743 people (22.4%) aged under 15 years, 1,209 (15.5%) aged 15 to 29, 3,804 (48.8%) aged 30 to 64, and 1,041 (13.4%) aged 65 or older.

People could identify as more than one ethnicity. The results were 89.4% European (Pākehā); 9.5% Māori; 3.4% Pasifika; 7.5% Asian; 1.1% Middle Eastern, Latin American and African New Zealanders (MELAA); and 2.5% other, which includes people giving their ethnicity as "New Zealander". English was spoken by 97.2%, Māori language by 1.0%, Samoan by 0.3%, and other languages by 12.3%. No language could be spoken by 2.0% (e.g. too young to talk). New Zealand Sign Language was known by 0.2%. The percentage of people born overseas was 31.4, compared with 28.8% nationally.

Religious affiliations were 30.9% Christian, 0.9% Hindu, 0.6% Islam, 0.2% Māori religious beliefs, 0.5% Buddhist, 0.2% New Age, 0.2% Jewish, and 1.5% other religions. People who answered that they had no religion were 57.8%, and 7.1% of people did not answer the census question.

Of those at least 15 years old, 1,767 (29.2%) people had a bachelor's or higher degree, 3,192 (52.7%) had a post-high school certificate or diploma, and 1,089 (18.0%) people exclusively held high school qualifications. The median income was $58,900, compared with $41,500 nationally. 1,608 people (26.6%) earned over $100,000 compared to 12.1% nationally. The employment status of those at least 15 was that 3,516 (58.1%) people were employed full-time, 846 (14.0%) were part-time, and 117 (1.9%) were unemployed.

Individual statistical areas
Name	Area (km^{2})	Population	Density (per km^{2})	Dwellings	Median age	Median income
Sunkist Bay	1.53	3,207	2,096	1,083	40.1 years	$57,100
Te Puru	7.30	4,590	629	1,533	41.0 years	$60,400
New Zealand					38.1 years	$41,500

== Landmarks and features ==
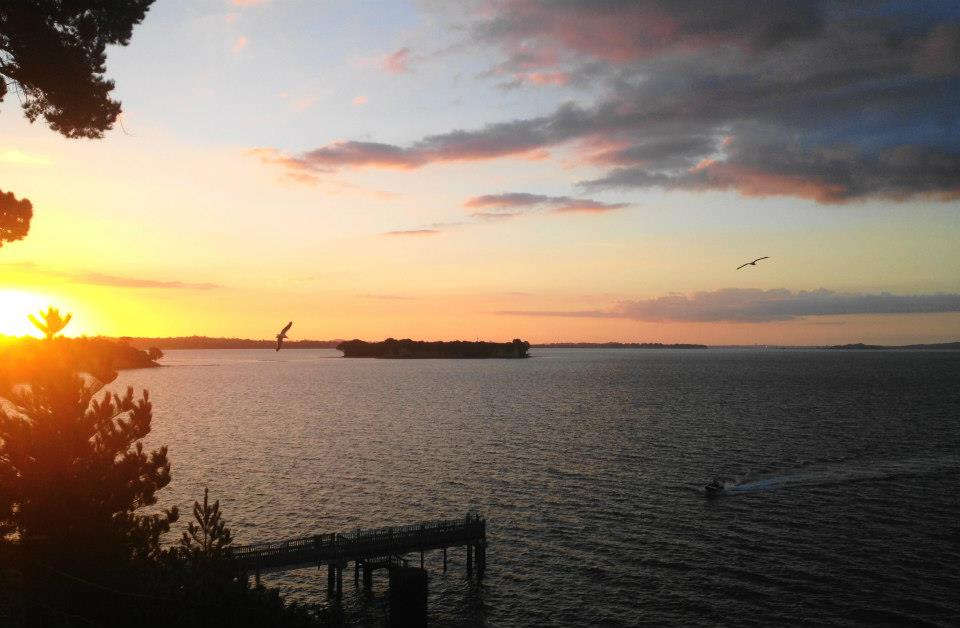
View from Beachlands overlooking Motukaraka Island and the Hauraki Gulf

Natural attractions in the immediate area include Sunkist Bay Beach, Shelly Beach and Snapper Rock. The Domain is the small park in the centre of Beachlands on the corner of Beachlands Road, Sunkist Bay Road and Karaka Road. Offshore, Motukaraka Island (also known as Flat Top Island or Flat Island) is located near the entrance to Pine Harbour Marina and is accessible at low tide. It is a short walk from the shore.

A walkway/cycle-way runs between Maraetai and Beachlands following the coast through Omana and Te Puru.

== Education ==
The first Beachlands School opened in 1925, while the present day Beachlands school opened in 1949. It is a coeducational full primary school (years 1–8) with a roll of 617 as of July 2026.

There are no colleges for students aged 13–18 in the area but there are free buses providing access to schools such as Howick College and Botany Downs Secondary College as well as special character schools such as Elim Christian College, Sancta Maria College, Saint Kentigern College and Star of the Sea primary school.

== Transportation ==
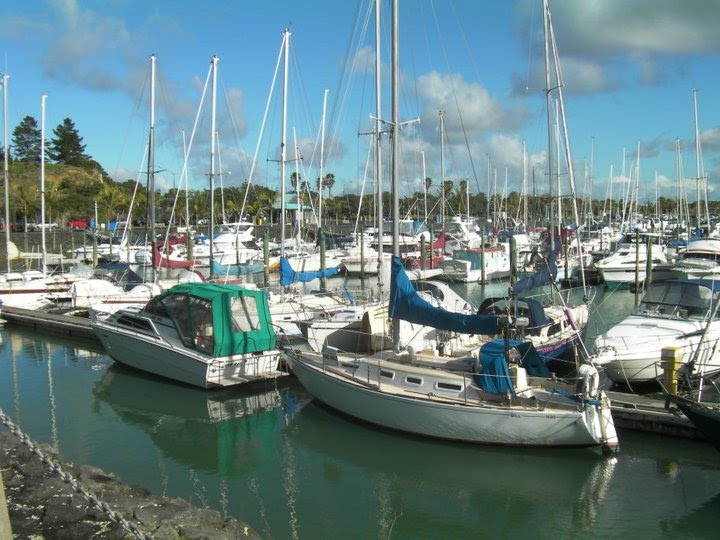
Pine Harbour Marina

The fully serviced marina at Pine Harbour includes a ferry service to central Auckland with 20 departures per day in each direction on Mondays to Fridays. In 2015, the 570-berth Pine Harbour Marina and some 9 hectares of associated land were sold for $22 million. The marina is a major transport hub for the area.

== Sports and recreation ==
Te Puru Sports Centre, located in Te Puru Park between Beachlands and Maraetai, is the base for the Te Puru Keas (junior cubs), Cubs, Scouts and Venturers. A gym, tennis, sports fields and a large indoor arena provide a cultural centre that unites Beachlands and neighbouring Maraetai into 'the Pohutukawa Coast' community. The Te Puru Centre was initiated by local effort and fundraising and completed with a 50% grant from former Manukau City Mayor Sir Barry Curtis.

== Local government ==
The first local government in the area was the Maraetai Highway Board, which was designated in 1867 and began operating in 1875. The board was absorbed into the Manukau County in 1914. On 22 November 1954, Beachlands was established as a county town within the Manukau County, which existed until the establishment of Manukau City in 1965. In November 2010, all cities and districts of the Auckland Region were amalgamated into a single body, governed by the Auckland Council.

Beachlands is part of the Franklin local board area, who elects members of the Franklin Local Board. Residents of Beachlands also elect the Franklin ward councillor, who sits on the Auckland Council.

== Bibliography ==
- La Roche, Alan (2011). Grey's Folly: A History of Howick, Pakuranga, Bucklands-Eastern Beaches, East Tamaki, Whitford, Beachlands and Maraetai. Auckland: Tui Vale Productions. ISBN 978-0-473-18547-3. OCLC 1135039710. Wikidata Q118286377.
