= Ōmana Regional Park =

New Zealand regional park

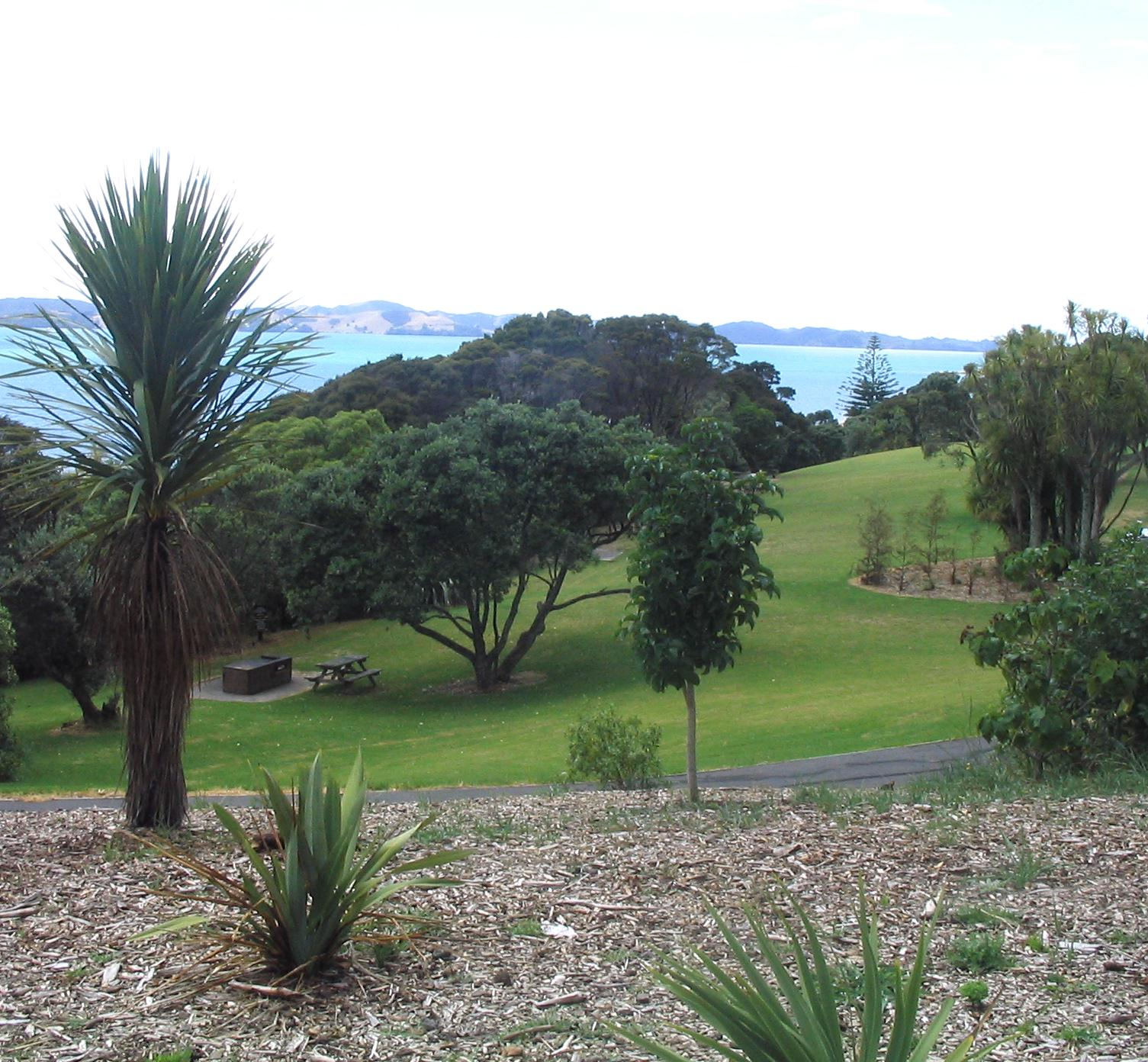
- View from Ōmana towards Waiheke Island

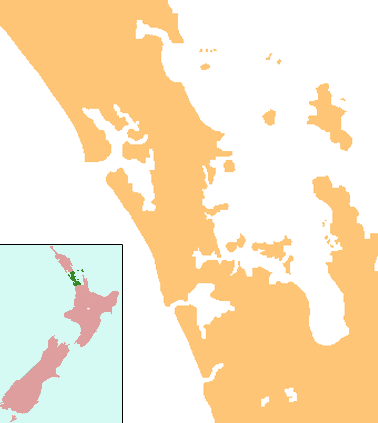
- Location within New Zealand Auckland
- Location: Franklin, Auckland, New Zealand
- Coordinates: 36.8799°S 175.0239°E
- Operator: Auckland Council

Ōmana Regional Park is situated south-east of Auckland and just west of Maraetai, in the Franklin area of the Auckland Region on the North Island of New Zealand. It is owned and managed by Auckland Council.

== Geography ==
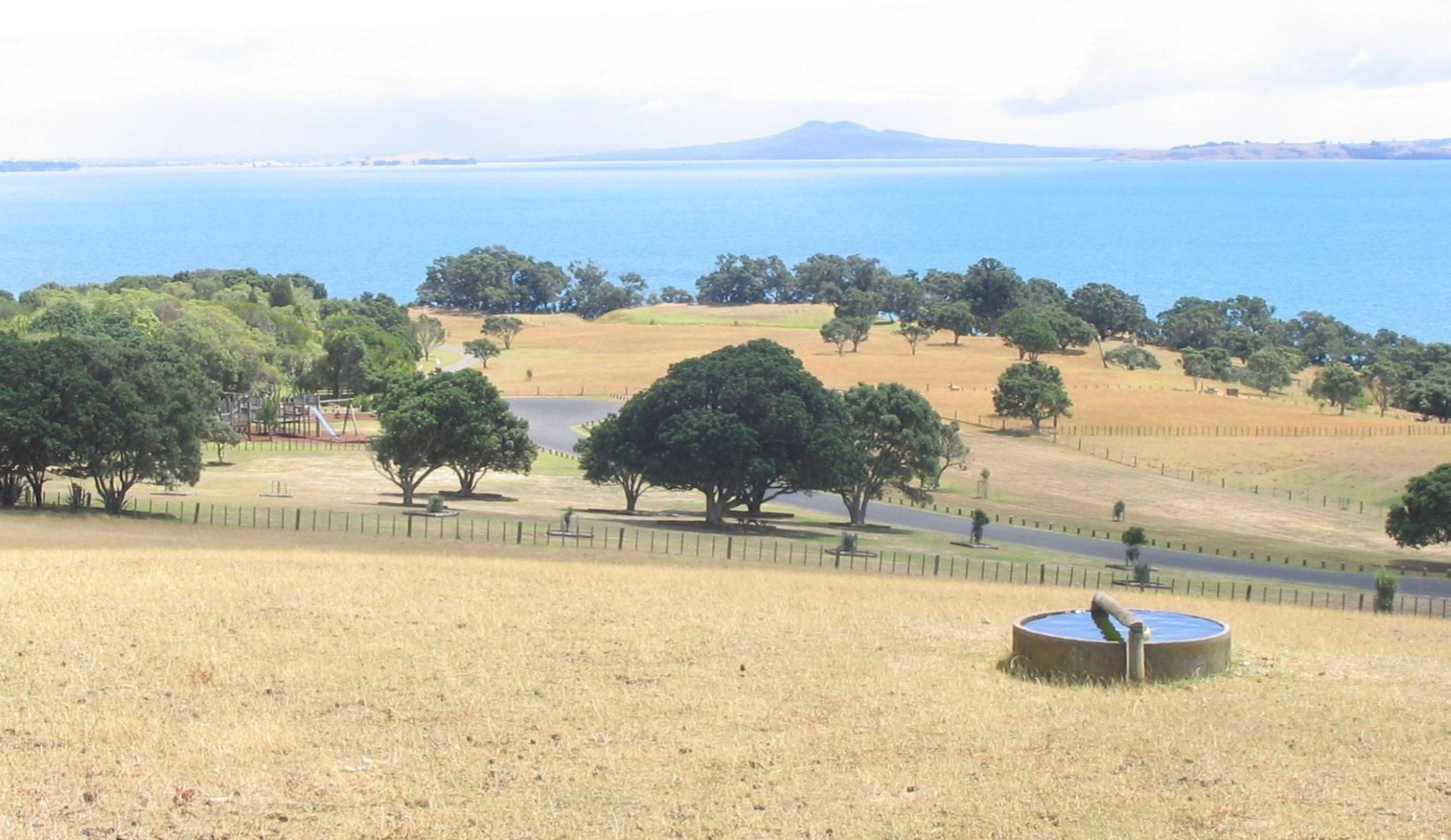
View over Ōmana park from the highest point, 40 metres above sea level, towards Rangitoto Island

The park is located on a gently contoured knoll, which rises 40 meters above sea level. From the highest point looking inland, visitors can see from Maraetai to the Beachlands settlements. Looking seaward, there are views of the Hauraki Gulf.

The eastern boundary is the Whitford-Maraetai road which is separated from view by a strip of mature native bush. There are 40.81 hectares of park of which about 20 hectares are used to graze sheep and the rest is used for recreational activities. The western boundary is the brackish Te Puru Creek.

=== Birds ===
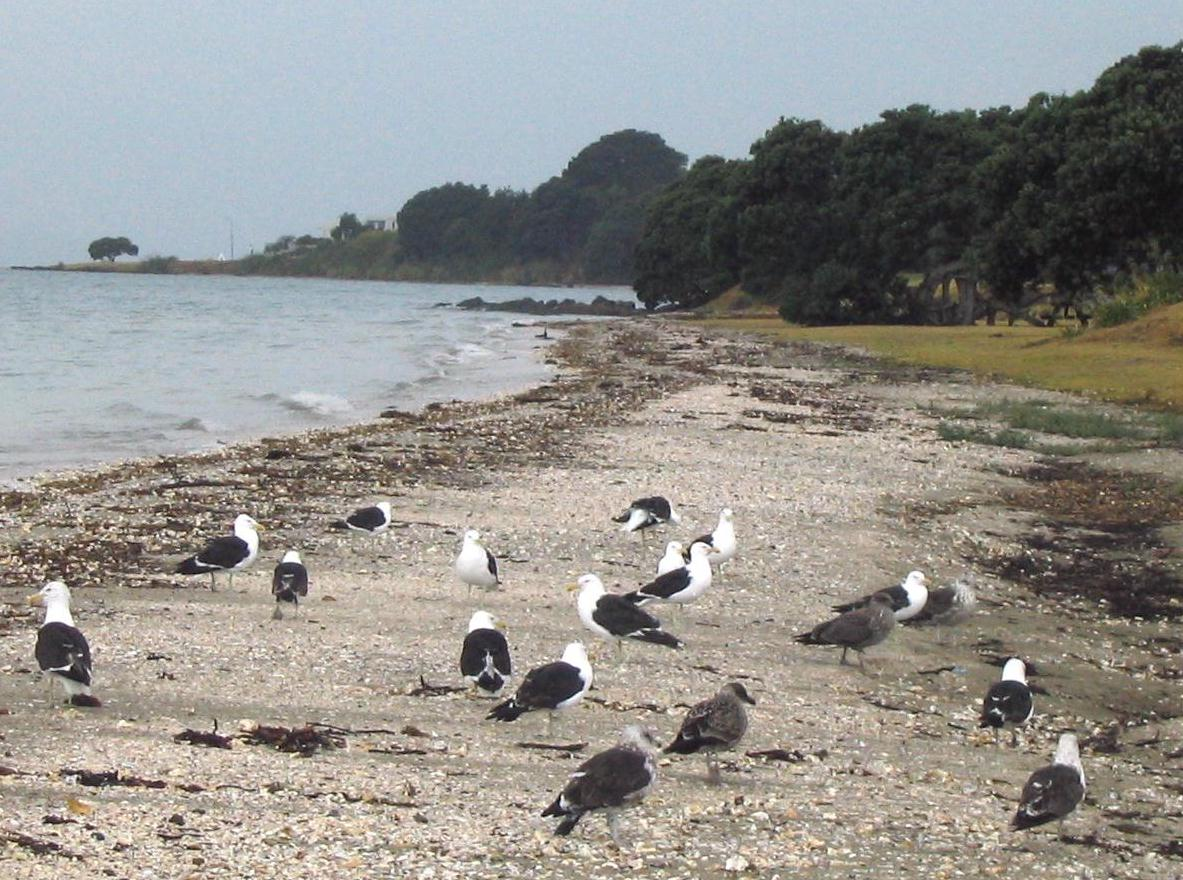
Southern black-backed gulls.

At least twenty-six different types of bird are found in the park. natives include: pied stilt, pūkeko (Porphyrio melanotus), kererū, tūī which appears almost black except for a white tuft under its chin, fantail, grey warbler, red-billed gull, southern black-backed gull (see kelp gull), South Island pied oystercatcher and the closely related variable oystercatcher (Haematopus unicolor), pied shag, kingfisher, and white-faced heron. The white-fronted tern can be found resting on the greywacke outcrops which become visible at low tide.

=== Geology ===
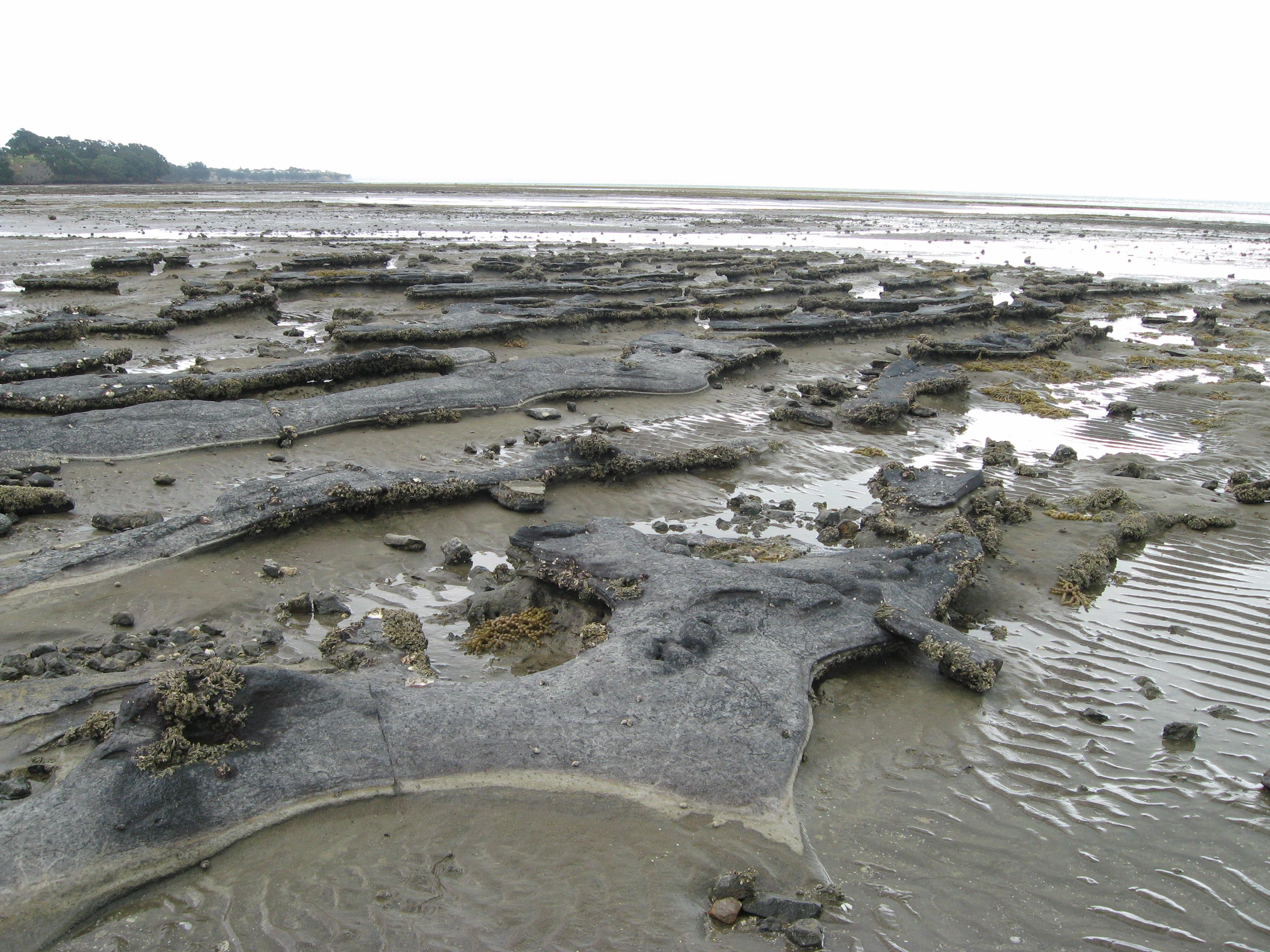
Ōmana shore platform, sandstones about 19 million years old.

The beach and extensive rock platform, form the northern boundary of the park. The whole of Ōmana Regional Park is underlain at a depth of 30 to 100m by ancient greywacke (a harder basement sedimentary rock). The greywacke belongs to the Waiheke group. The softer more recent sandstone is of the Waitamata group.

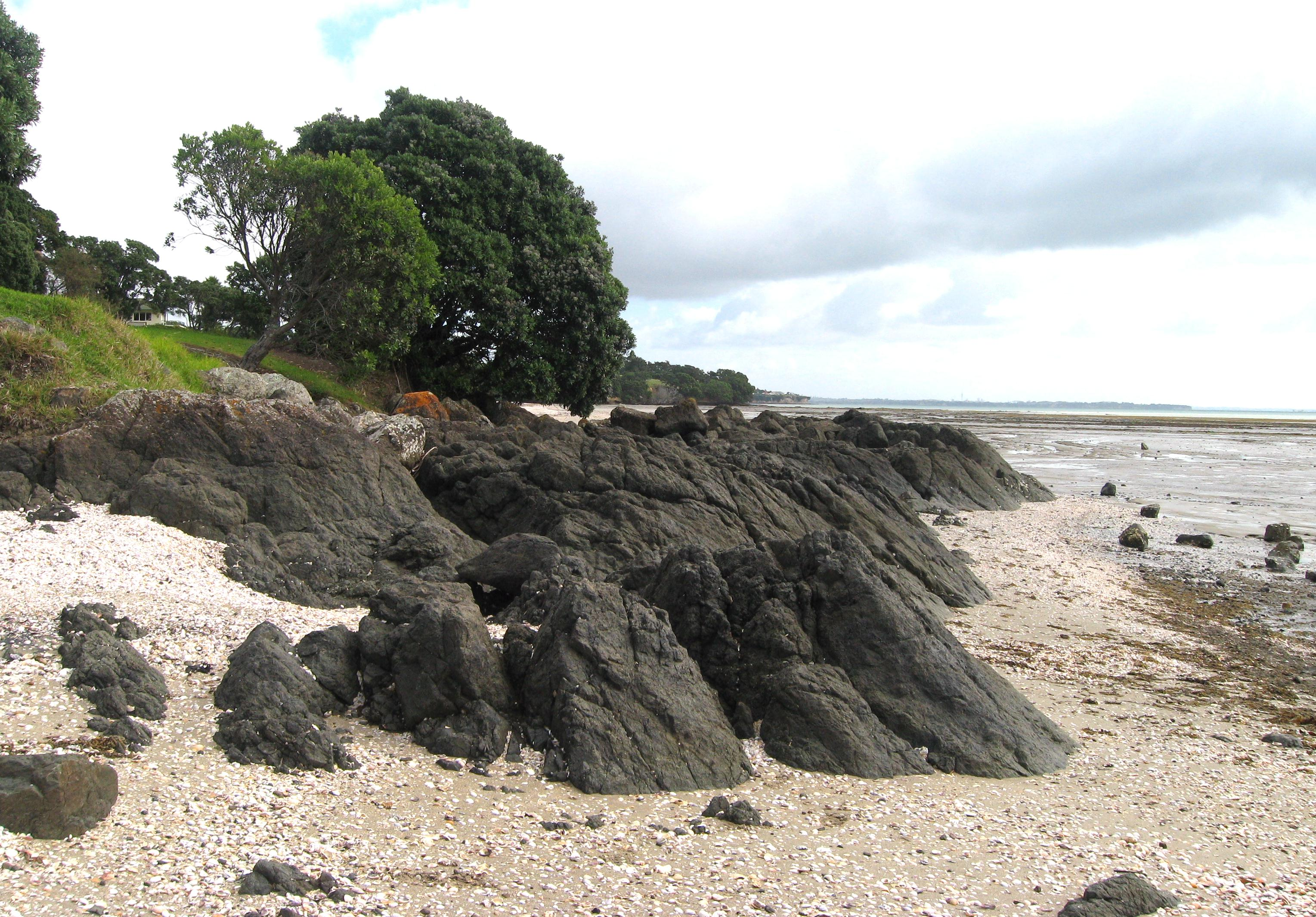
Ancient (200-million-year-old) greywacke outcrop.

The layered sandstones and siltstones (mudstones) are seen in the cliff faces and also form the shore platform around the north and west sides of the park. These softer, generally yellow-brown rocks are approximately 19-20 million years old and are made up of the Waitamata formation (East Coast Bays facies) of early Miocene (Late Otaian) age. Distortion and faulted dipping, of this once soft strata, can be seen both in the cliffs and in the small ridges of the rock platform extending out from the beach at low tide.

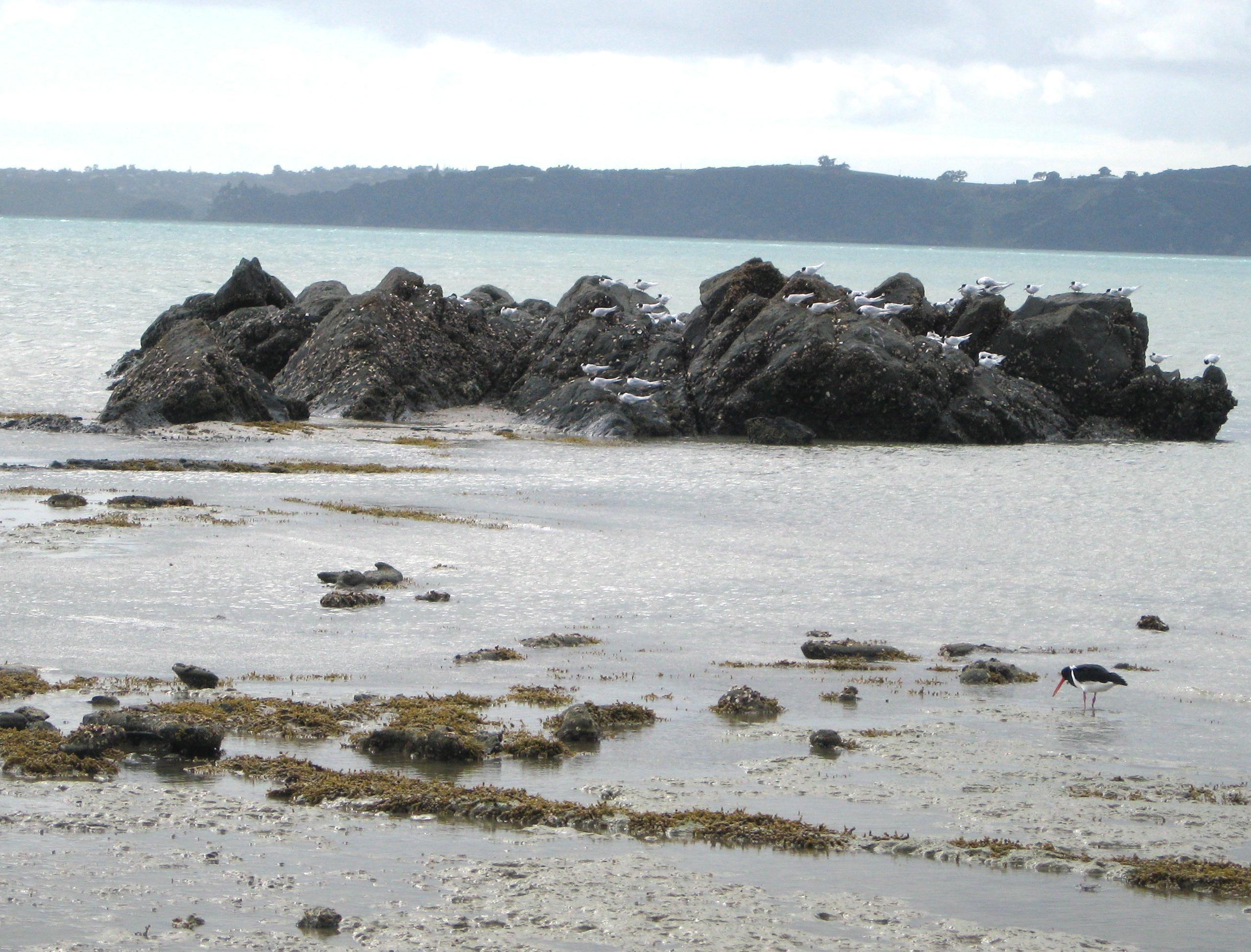
Ancient greywacke, poking through the 19-million-year-old mudstone shore platform.

What makes an interesting discovery is that protruding through the softer yellow-brown sedimentary sandstone and mudstone layers, there are ancient (200-million-year-old) tips of greywacke sea stacks from the Jurassic age. They are older and harder (cut or formed from the original 200-million-year-old greywacke about 25 million years ago). They are about 1–2 meters high and are found in the shore platform, about 200 metres east of the park at Ōmana Beach.

Holocene sands (less than 7000 years old) form the flat area behind Ōmana Beach and at Te Puru Creek.

==== Simplified geological overview ====
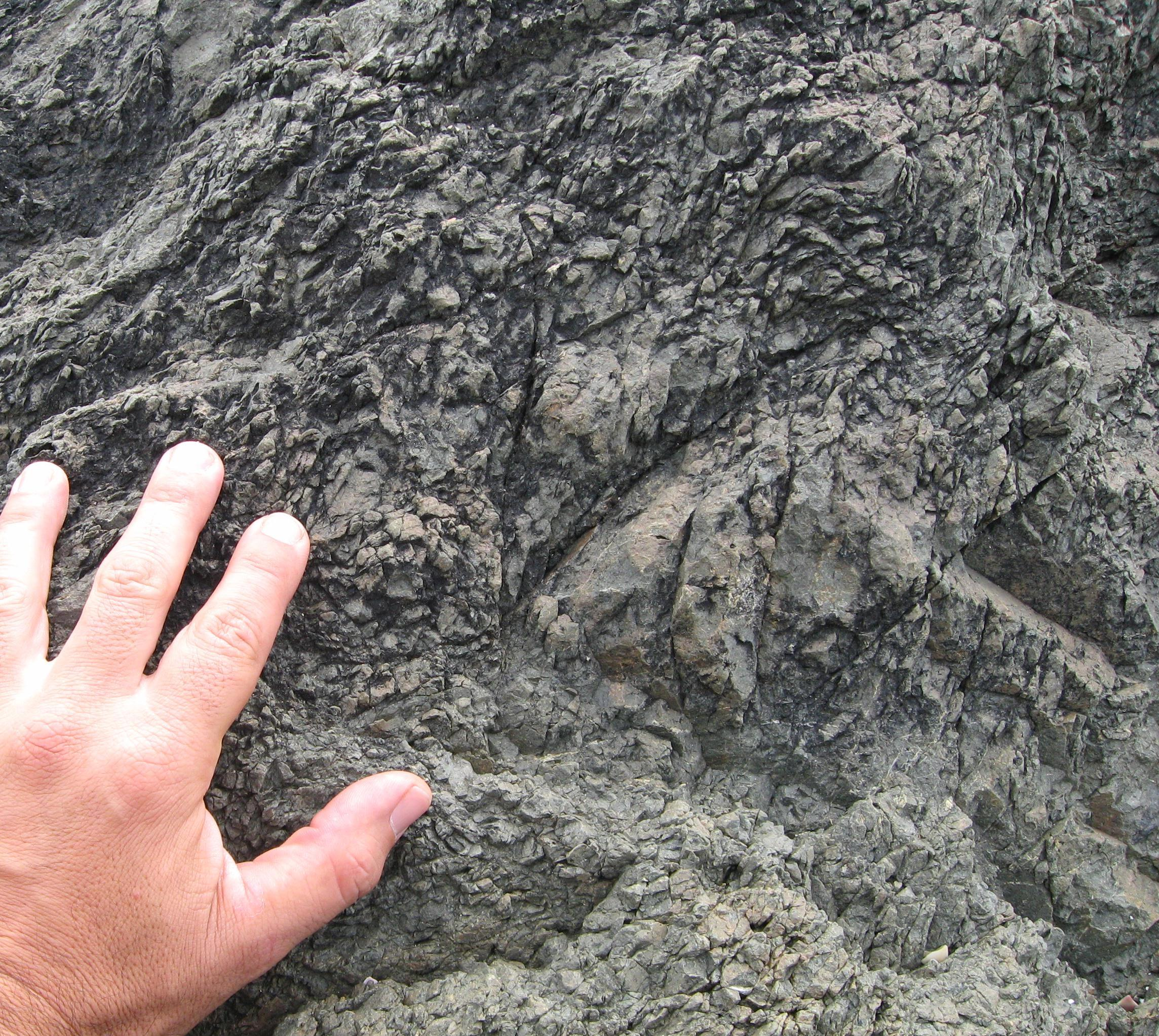
Greywacke, an ancient sedimentary rock.

200 to 150 million years ago, sand eroded from the super-continent Gondwana into a deep trough in the sea floor. These deposits were kilometers thick and compressed, folded and heated became hard greywacke.

150 to 120 million years ago, the hard greywacke was uplifted and became the first mountainous backbone of New Zealand. 120 to 70 million years ago, the mountain ranges were eroded to a great degree. 35 to 15 million years ago, the sea completely covered much of New Zealand. During this long quiet period, sediments were deposited over the old basement rock and gradually metamorphosed into sandstones. 15 to 5 million years ago, the greywackes were again uplifted (Late Miocene). This second set of earth movements, known as the Kaikoura Orogeny, elevated large fault-bounded blocks to form the horsts (upfaulted blocks of land) of the Hunua and Coromandel Ranges, and threw down the grabens (down-faulted blocks) of the Firth of Thames and Hauraki Gulf which Ōmana now overlooks.

=== Vegetation ===
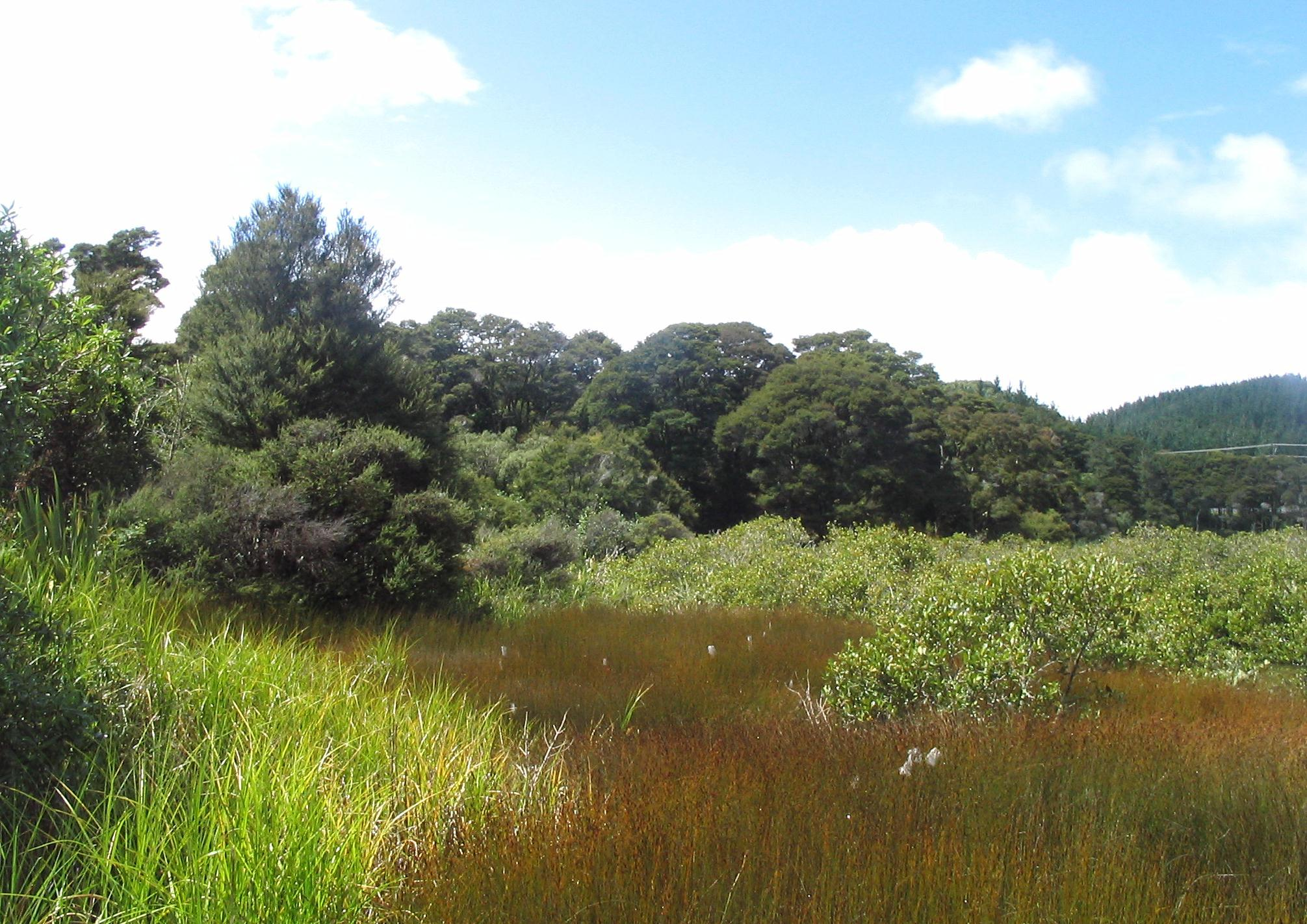
Salt marsh, Te Puru creek. mangroves and kanuka

Apart from the pōhutukawa and grass areas, there is a southern patch of mature tānekaha and a northern patch of pūriri (ripe red berries) and taraire. Other large trees include rewarewa, mapou, kōwhai, tōtara, tree ferns, cabbage trees, and kahikatea. Kānuka can be found on the slopes of the Te Puru creek (the estuarine mangrove salt marsh).

=== Intertidal ecology ===
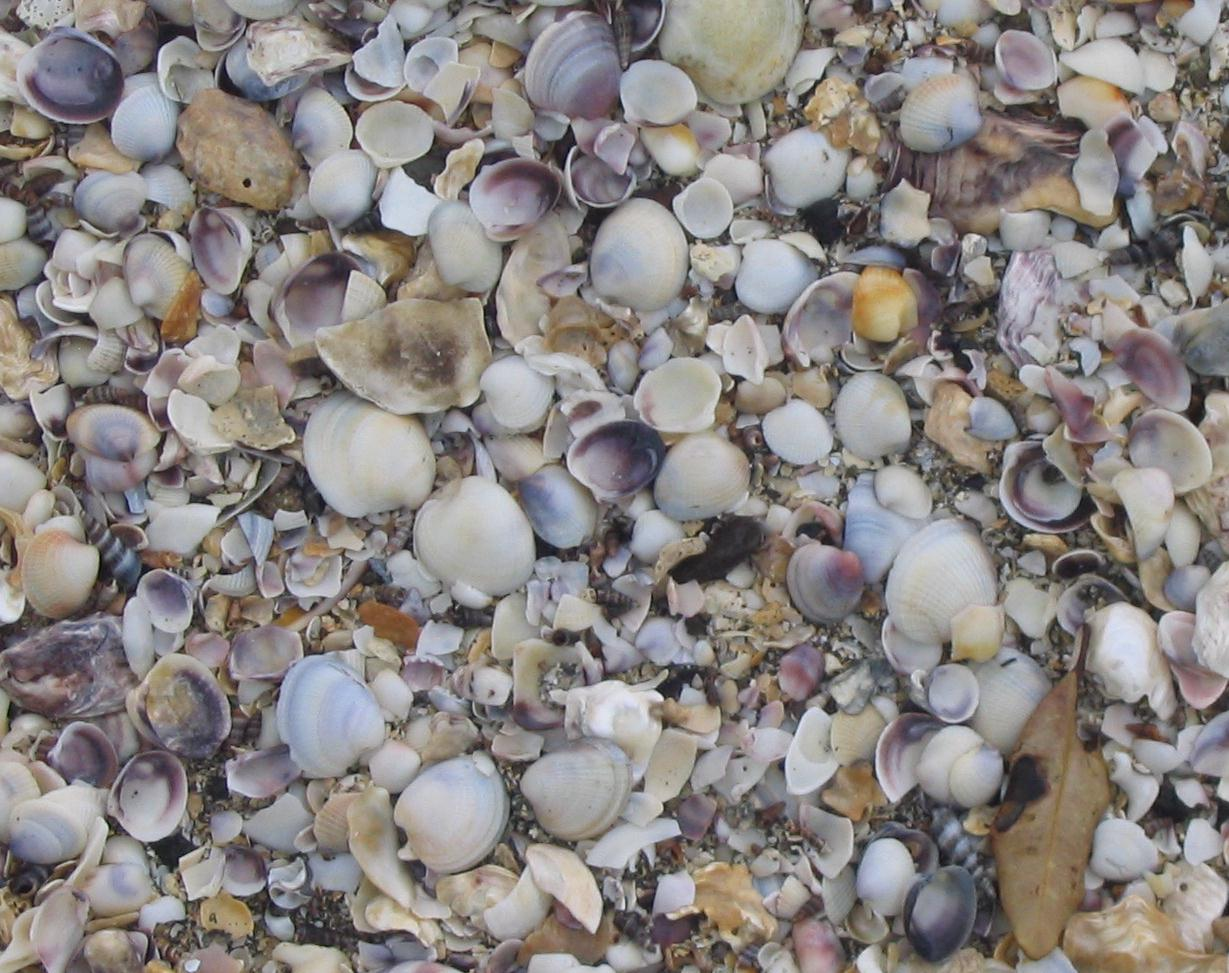
Cockle shells on Ōmana beach.

The intertidal ecology is mainly composed of three areas:

- Rocky shore platform with small pools at low tide on north and west of the park are occupied by small barnacles, rock oysters, Neptune's necklace (a sea weed) and tube worms.
- Sand and mudflats surrounding the shore platform contain cockles, pipi (Paphies australis), crabs and Polychaete worms. Because of the cockle bed out in the sea, the cockle shells wash up high on the beach during storms. The sand can be found underneath.
- Mangroves with mud snails (Amphibola crenata), small mussels and barnacles.

== History ==
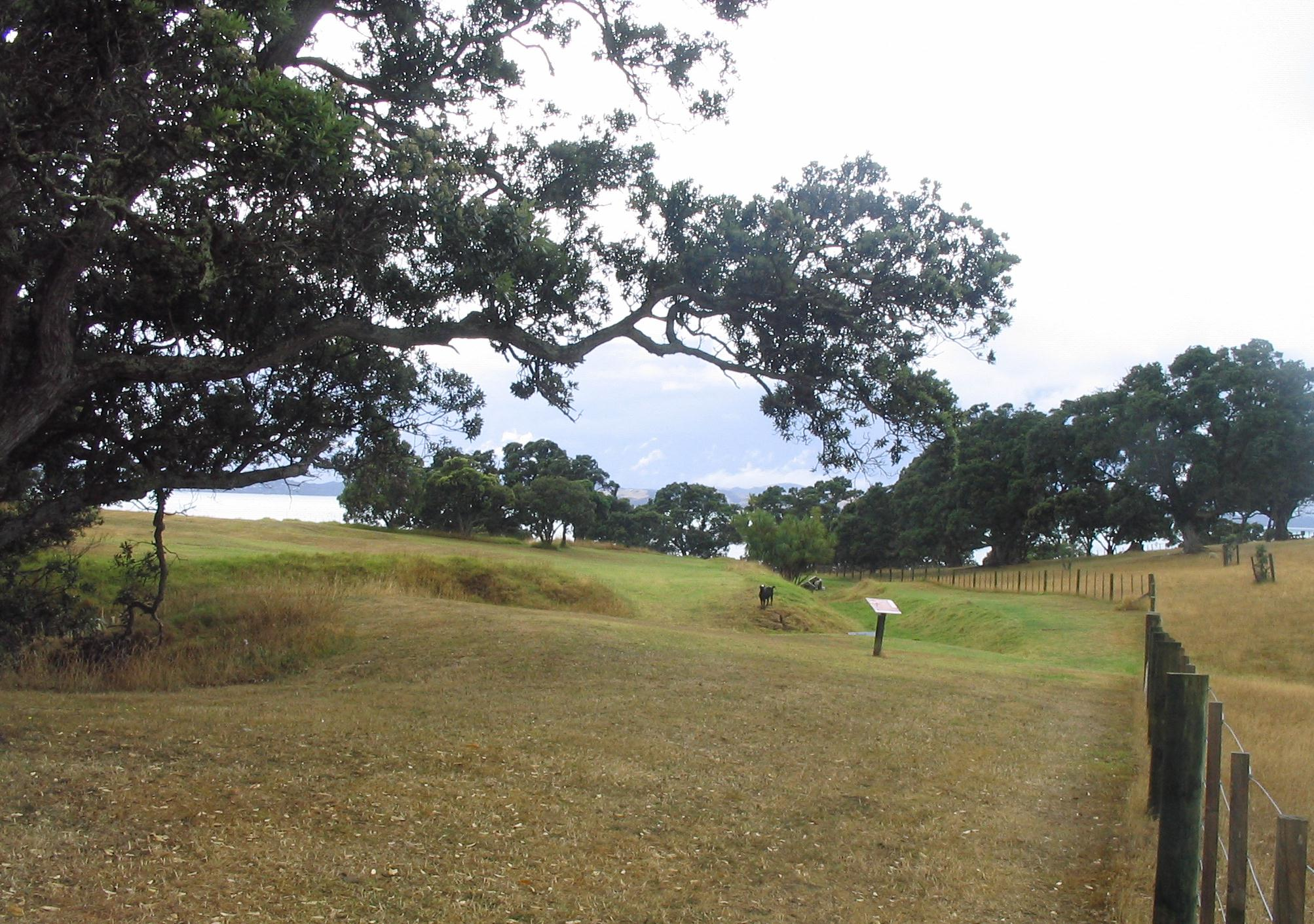
O-manutere pa site showing ring ditch.

Ōmana Regional Park has been a traditional home for Ngāi Tai ki Tāmaki for generations. The name Ōmana is a shortening of Ōmanawatere ("The Place of Manawatere"), referring to the name of a Ngāi Tai ancestor. According to legend, "This man Manawatere came from Hawaiki, he did not come in a canoe (waka), he glided over the ripples of the waves". The ARC information board beside the pa says he rode on the back of a taniwha.

On the perimeter track, visitors will find a grassed area, overlooking the sea, which was the original site of a Ngāi Tai pā. (see Pā). This grassed area has a deep ditch whose internal bank would have once been much higher and topped with a strong palisade of posts. O-Manawatere is a relatively small pā.

The park was part of William Fairburn's Maraetai Mission Station, which operated from 1837 to 1842. It was one of the first European farms in eastern Auckland. The forest covering the park and surrounding area was felled for timber by European settlers who cleared the land for farming during the mid-1840s. Kauri felled in the Maraetai hills behind Ōmana was hauled by bullock teams down to the sea and then floated to mills in Auckland. The Ōmana park area was also dug for kauri gum and even prospected for gold and silver. In 1852 following the discovery of gold in Coromandel many searched the hills digging shafts wherever quartz veins could be located.

The area was farmed continuously, since the development of the mission until March 1970, when it was purchased by the Auckland Regional Authority to be developed into a regional park.

== Gallery ==
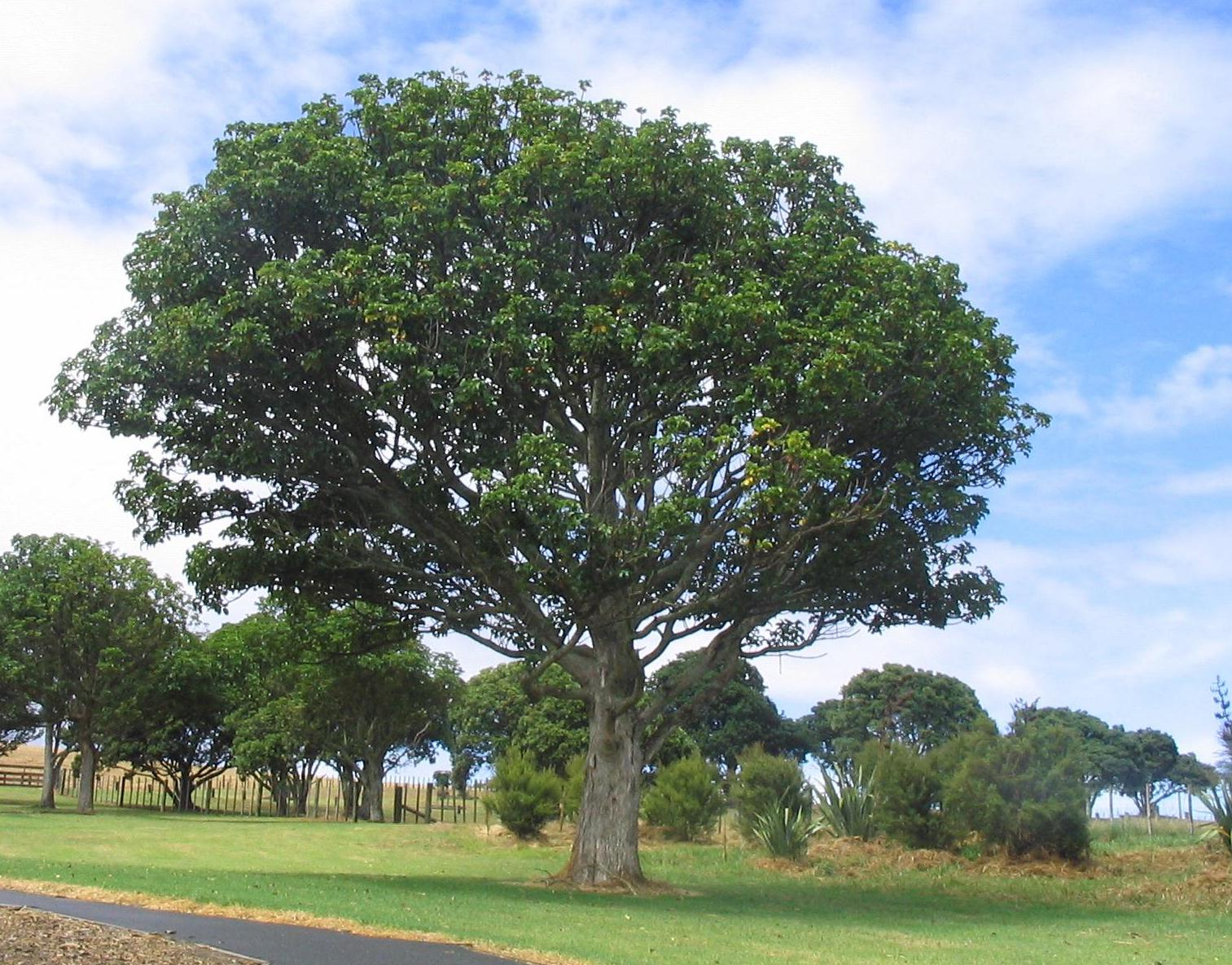
Pūriri (Vitex lucens) at Ōmana with red berries in summer.

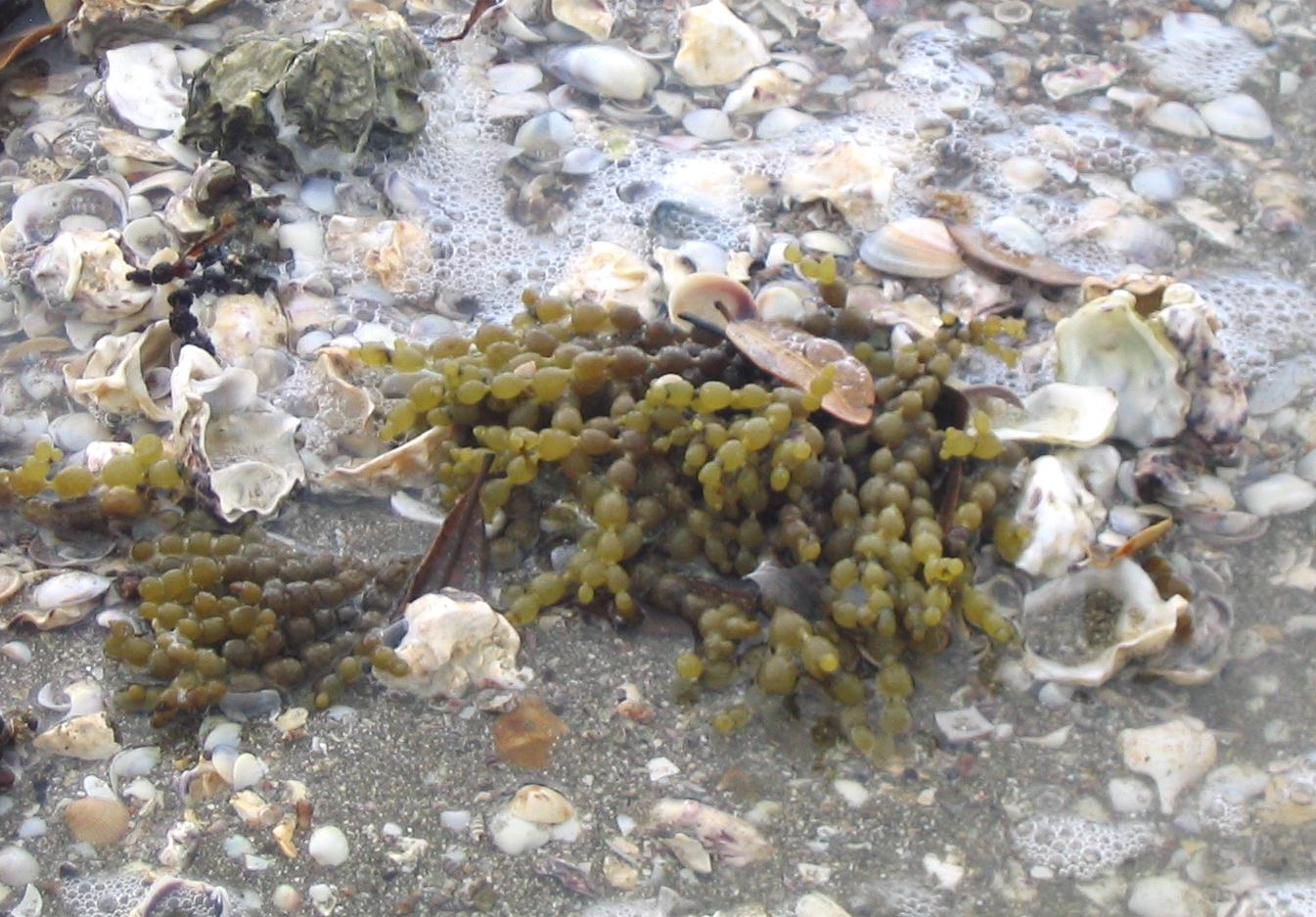
Neptune's necklace, Ōmana.

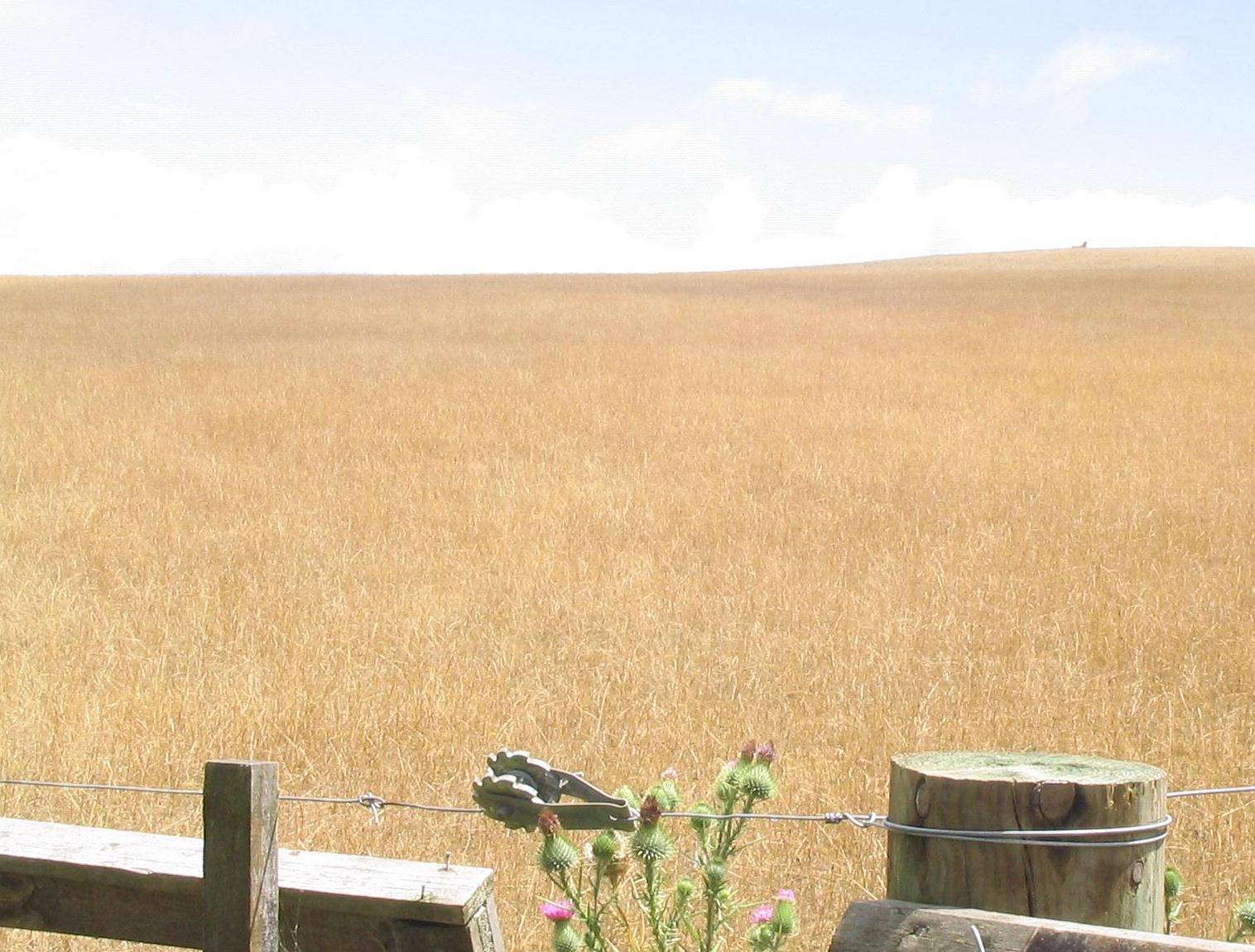
Dry grass of February. One sheep on the horizon, Ōmana.

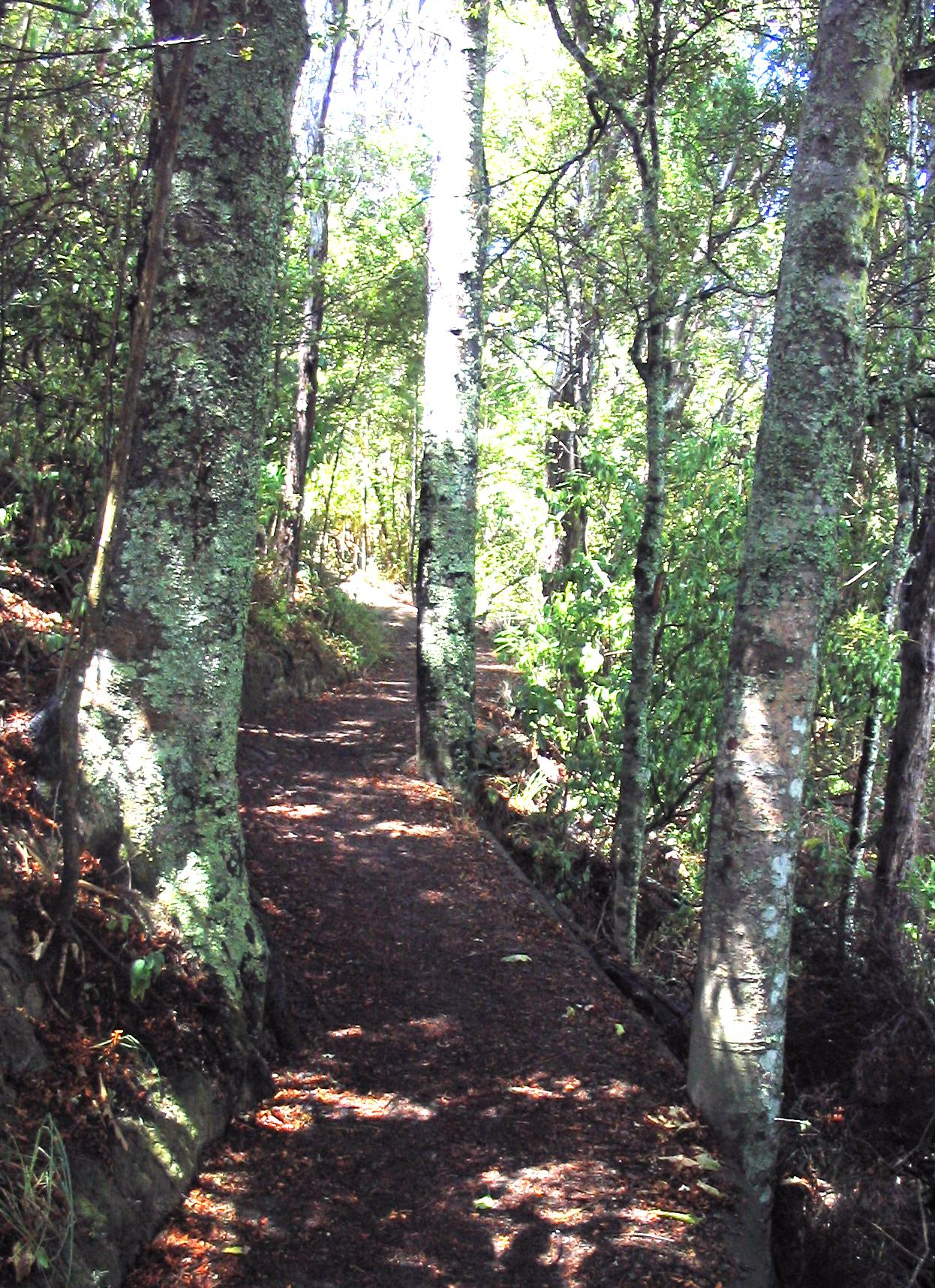
Young kauri on the perimeter walk.

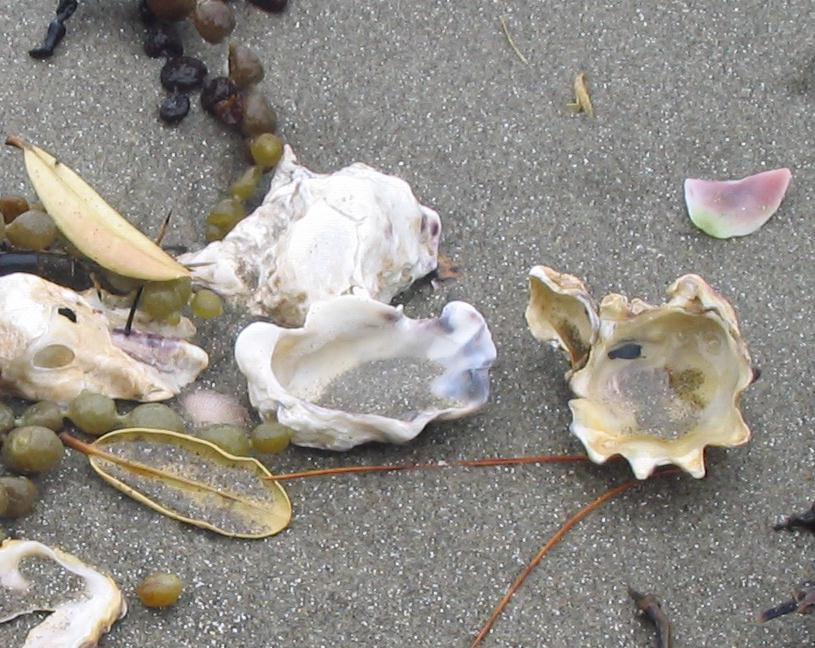
Oyster shells on Ōmana beach.

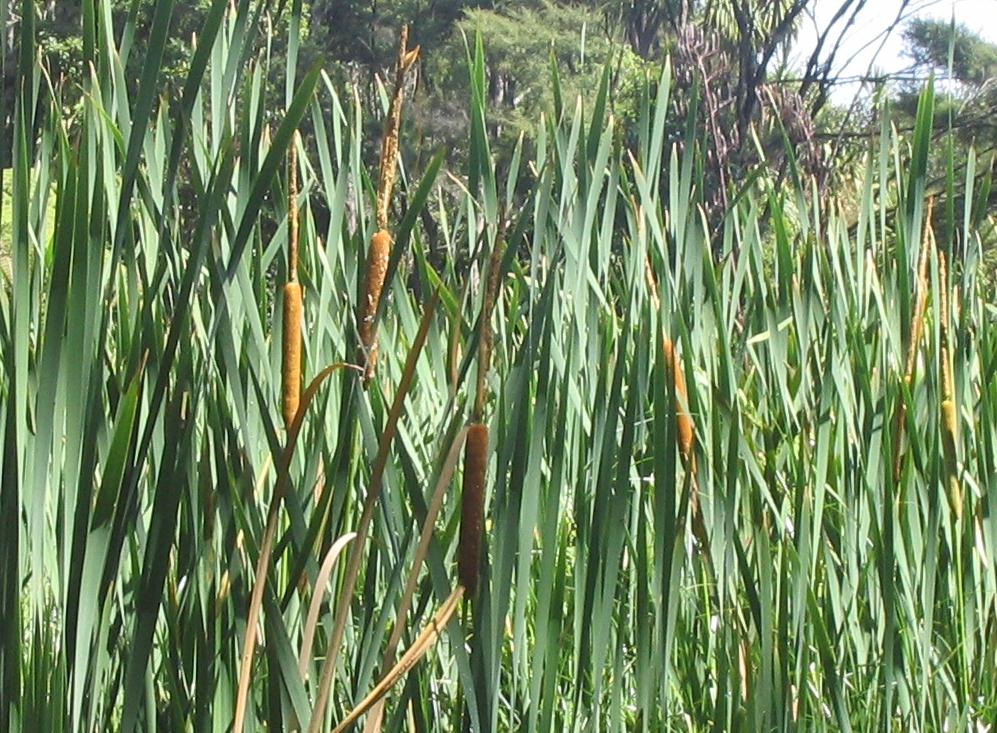
Raupo at Ōmana.

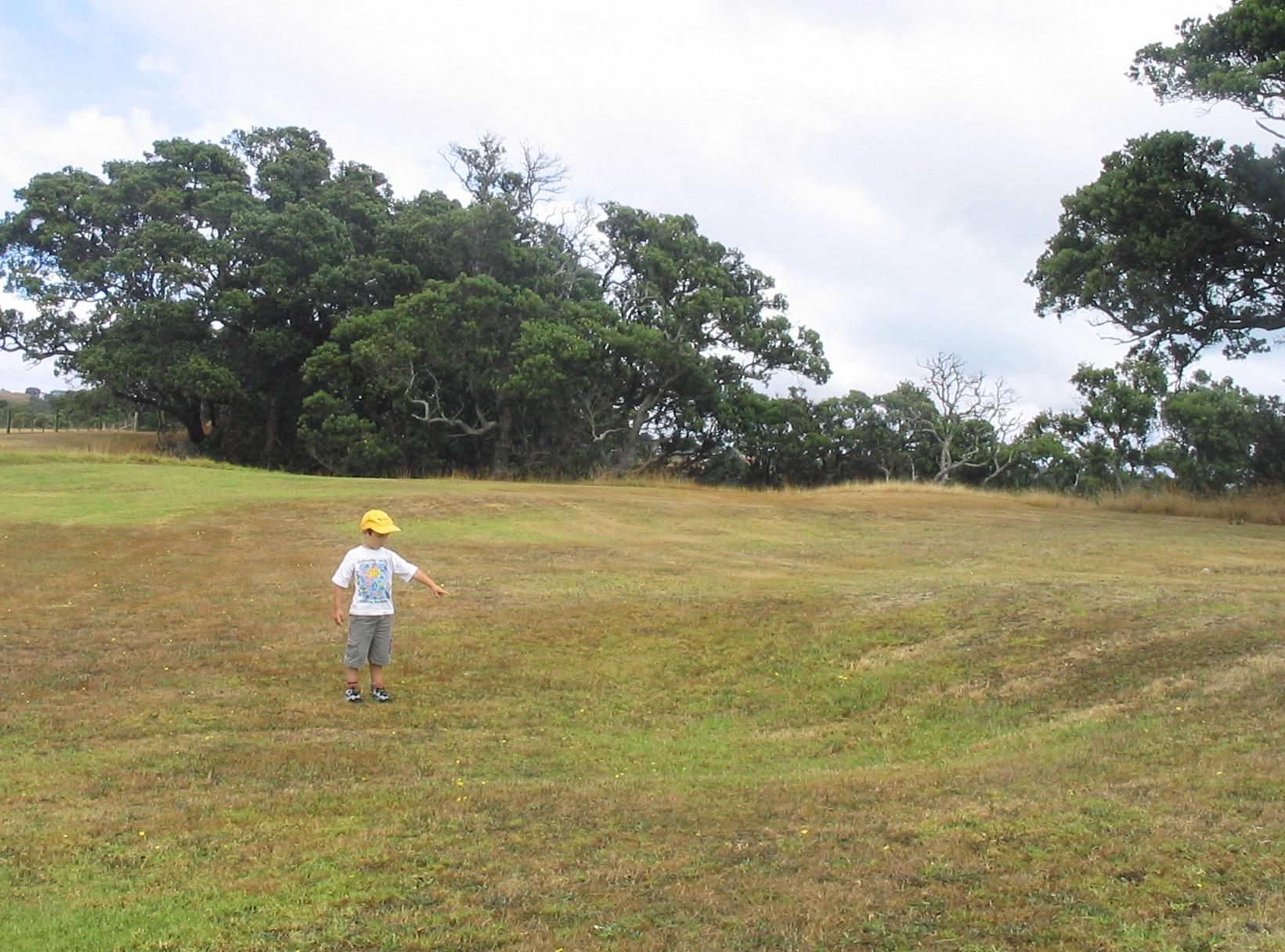
Kumara pit on the pa site.

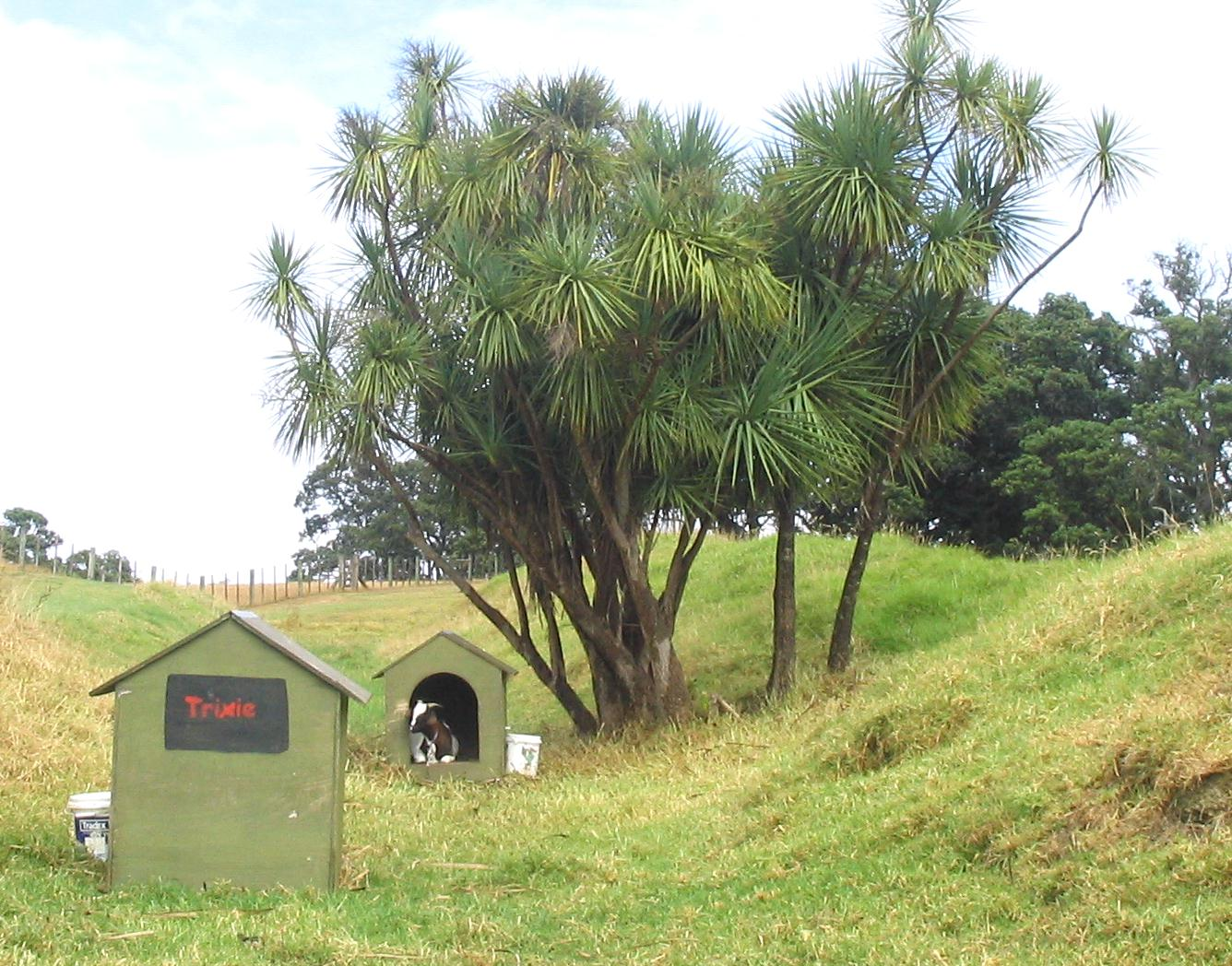
Goats and cabbage trees in the ditch beside the pa site.

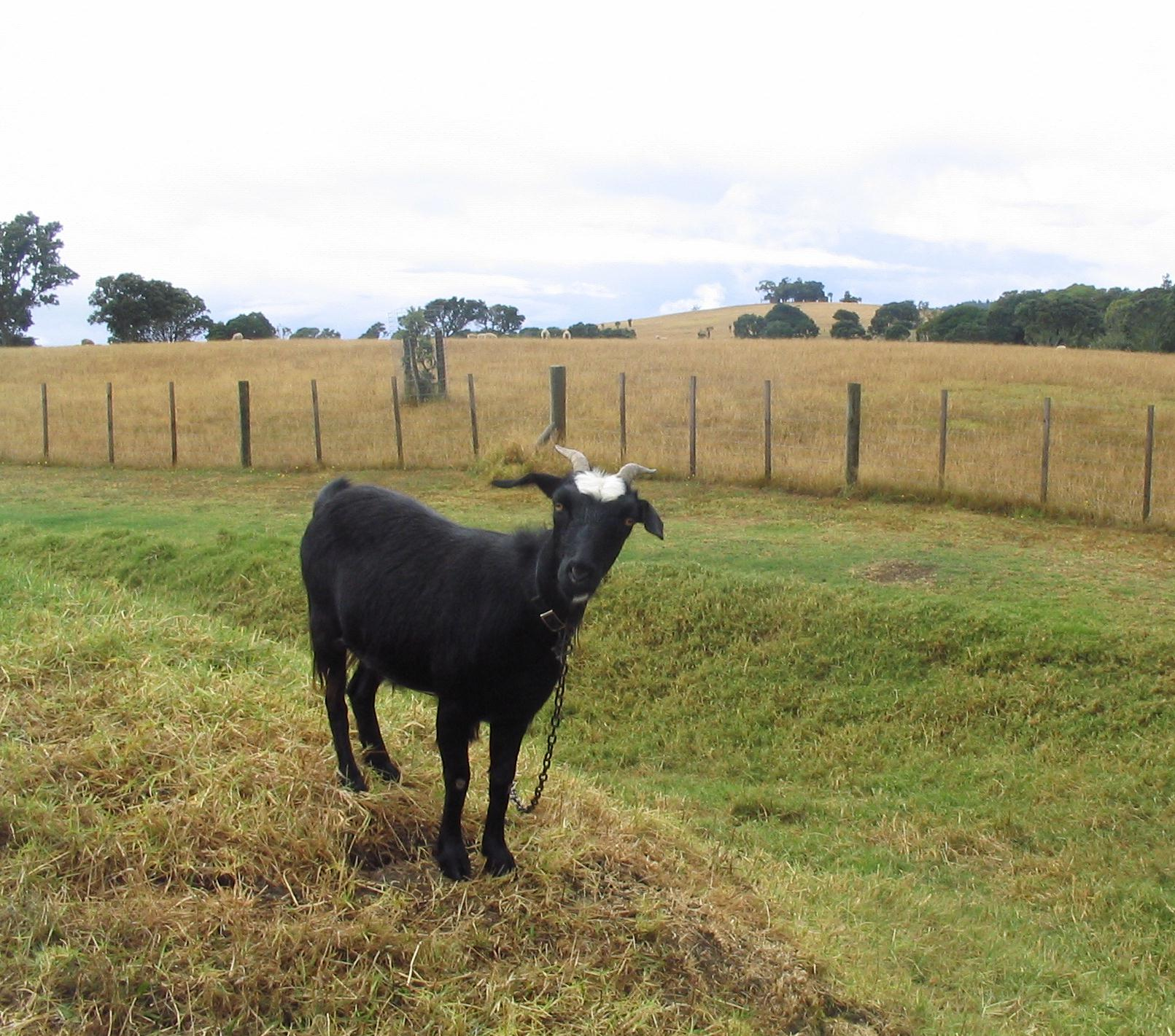
Goat with the pa ring ditch in the background.

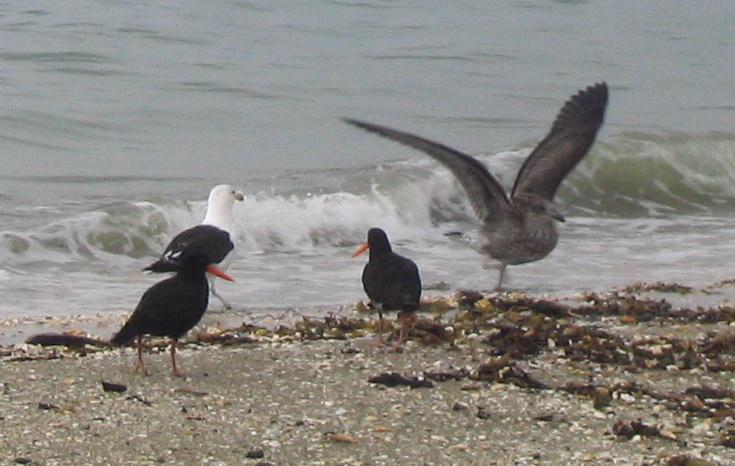
Two variable oystercatchers Haematopus unicolor.

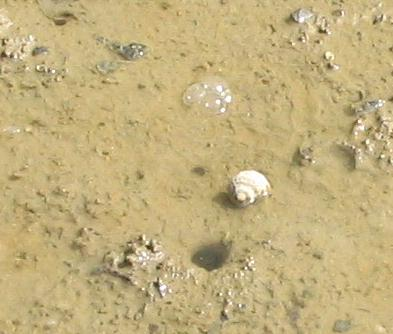
Mud snail near mangroves. Amphibola crenata (titiko).

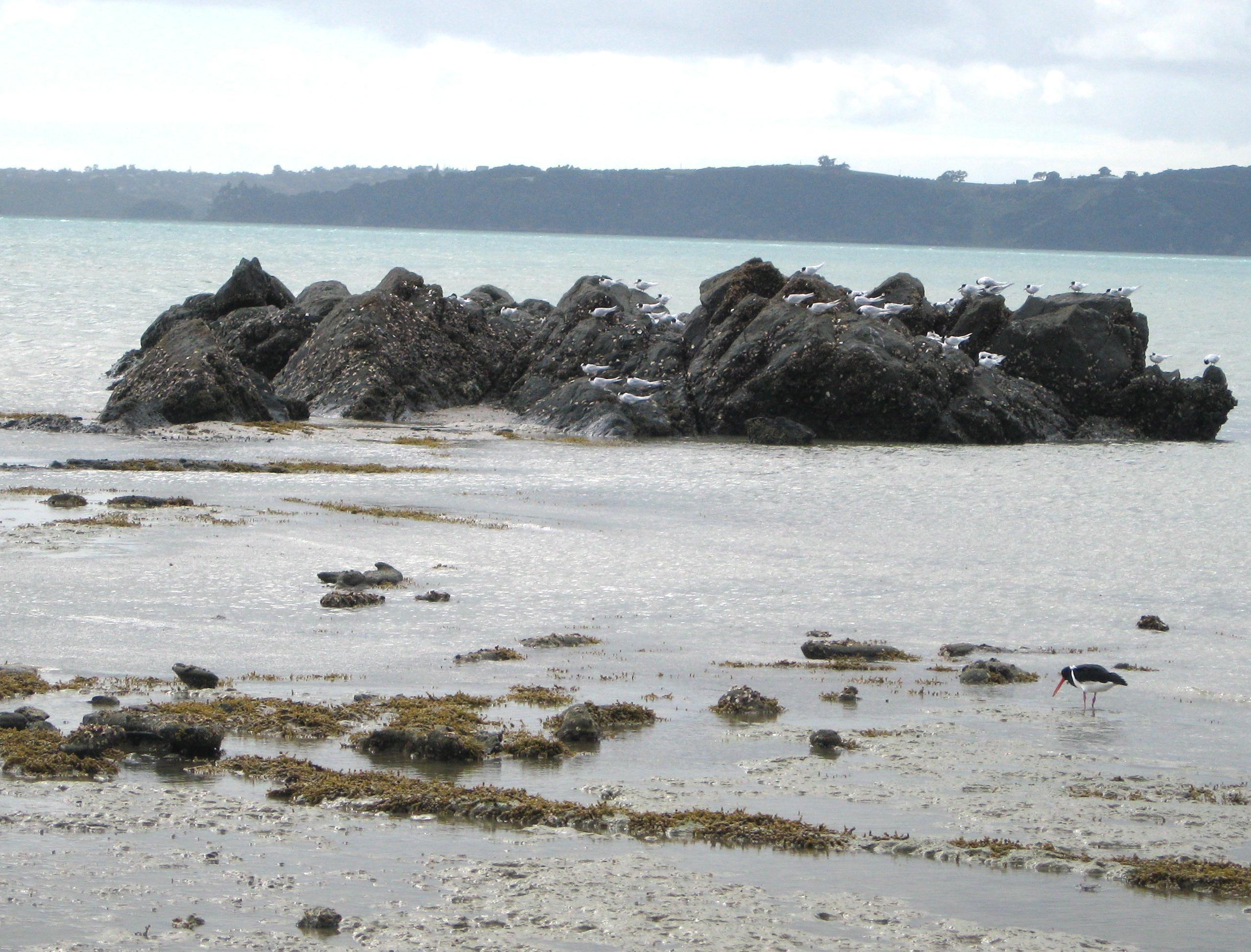
White-fronted terns on ancient Greywacke sea stack.
