= Maraetai Mission Station =

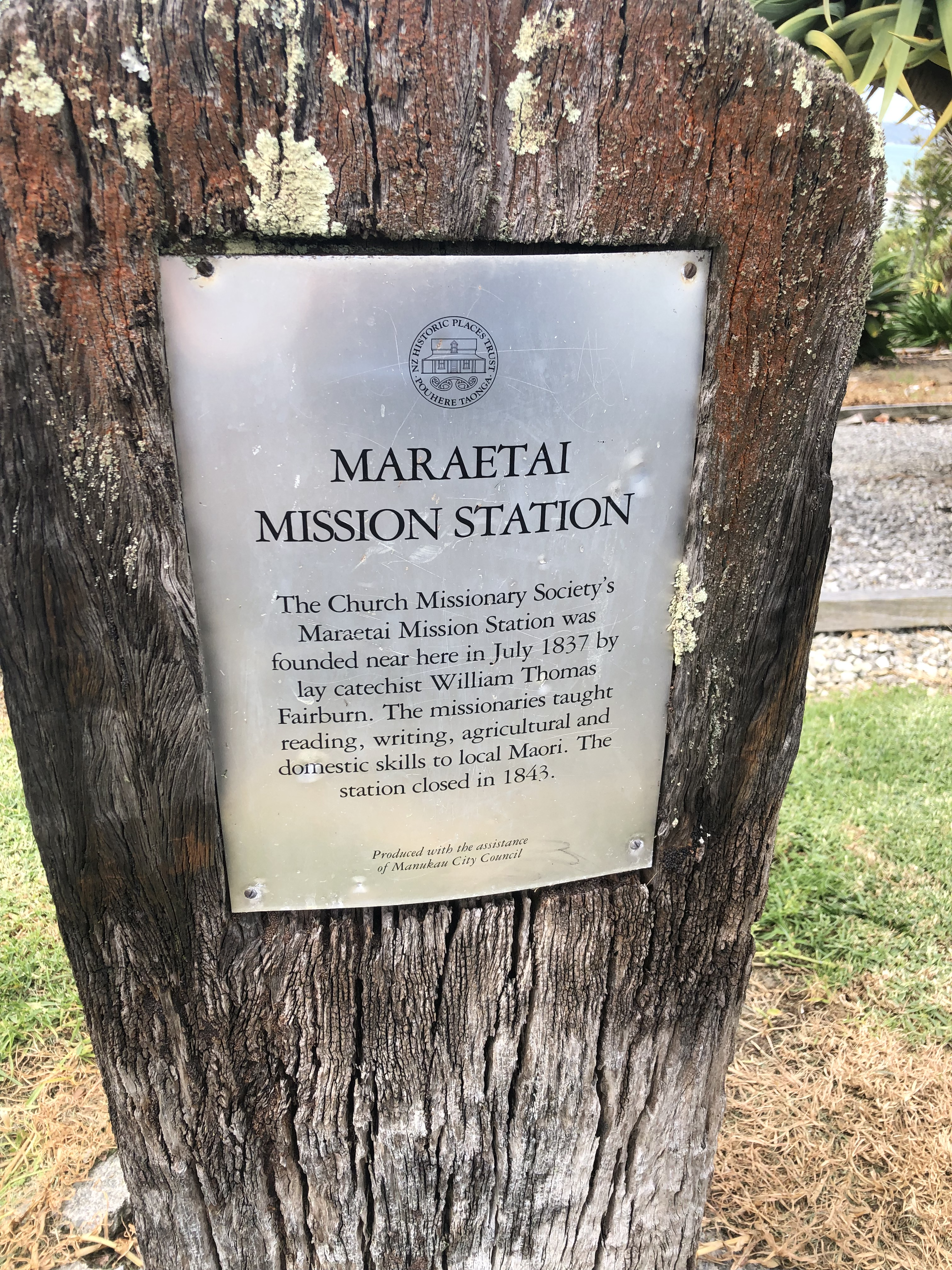
- Maraetai Mission Station plaque, at the original mission site. Located at 38–40 Campbell Road, Maraetai.
- Maraetai Mission Station
- 36.87851°S 175.03155°E
- Location: Maraetai, Auckland
- Denomination: Anglicanism

History
- Founded: 1837
- Founder: William Thomas Fairburn

Architecture
- Closed: 1842

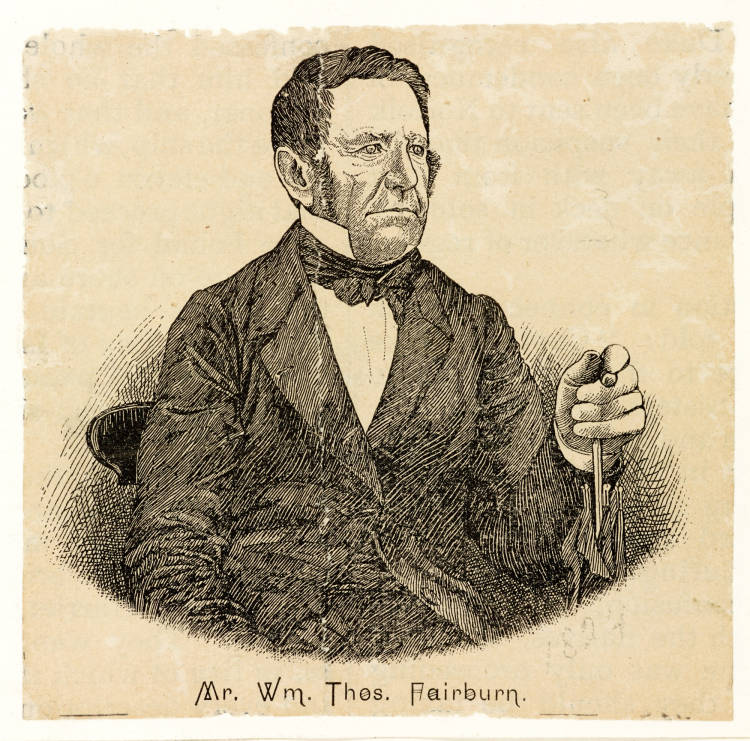
William Thomas Fairburn, founder of Maraetai Mission Station

Maraetai Mission Station was a Church Missionary Society founded mission based in Maraetai, Auckland, that operated between 1837 and 1842. It was founded and operated by William Fairburn, an English carpenter and lay preacher, until his resignation from the mission in December 1841. A school operated alongside the mission station, and was taught by Fairburn's wife Sarah and their daughter Elizabeth. At this school, Māori children, primarily Ngāi Tai and Ngāti Paoa, but also from other surrounding iwi, were taught reading, writing and arithmetic. The children were dressed in European clothing, and were taught the English alphabet by singing it to the tune of 'God Save the Queen'.

== The Fairburn purchase ==
Following the Ngāpuhi raids of the 1820s and 1830s, tensions persisted between Waikato, Auckland, and Hauraki tribes, and the land between the Wairoa and Tāmaki rivers had not been reoccupied since the 1821 exodus, due to fear of conflict. The Christian Missionary Society, who desired to establish a mission station somewhere within the Tāmaki isthmus, sought to find a resolution. In 1836, a group of missionaries travelled from the Bay of Islands to Puriri, a previously established mission station, to gather individuals to travel into the isthmus. Henry Williams led this expedition, and two Ngāpuhi chiefs, Rewa and Moka, were also present, to act as mediators. In January 1836, at Puriri, the land transaction known as the 'Fairburn purchase' took place, upon suggestion by Williams to the present chiefs. This land, which totalled 83,000 acres (34,000 ha), was sold to Fairburn, as it was seen as the most agreeable option at the time, largely in part to Fairburn's promise to keep the land in a trust, and for the land to act as a neutral area for the tribes. Therefore, while the iwi sold the land, there was an understanding that they could continue to live and work there, This understanding was confirmed by Fairburn when he promised to return one third of the land in 1837. The Fairburn purchase was considerably the largest pre-treaty land sale in the Hauraki region.

The chiefs that sold the land ‘received as return for that land Tamaki, ninety blankets, twenty-four axes, twenty-four adzes, twenty-six hoes, fourteen spades, eighty dollars, nine hundred pounds tobacco, twenty four combs, [and] twelve plane irons’, followed by a payment in instalments of £902. The boundaries of this land stretched from the Tāmaki River to the Wairoa River, from Ōtāhuhu out to Howick and Clevedon, and as far east as Maraetai. According to the deed of sale, which was completed by Fairburn, the sellers were 'Turiri, the chief and his people called Ngatitawaki, Herua, the chief and his people called Urikaraka, Hauauru, the chief and his people called Matekiwaho'. Signatories included Ngāti Paoa, as well as other Thames iwi, and also Te Akitai and Ngāti Whātua. In 1854, a 6,000-acre (2,400 ha) section of the purchased land, between Maraetai Beach and Umupuia, was designated as a reserve for Ngāi Tai. It was on this block of land where Fairburn established the Maraetai Mission Station.

== Establishment ==
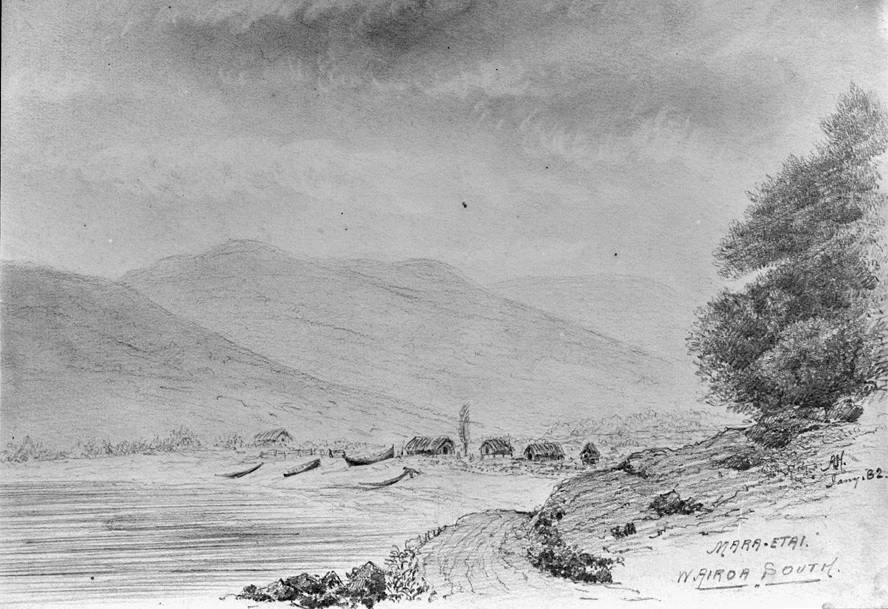
Pencil Sketch of Umupuia, Maraetai in 1882.

From early 1833, the Church Missionary Society initiated plans to expand the mission beyond the Bay of Islands, and into the more southern regions of the North Island. In January 1833 Fairburn was directed to Tamaki (Panmure) as a possible site for a mission station, however Puriri was eventually settled on as the new mission site, due to the central location of the river system that linked Hauraki with Waikato and Tauranga.

The mission station buildings were made from raupō, and timber framing was reused multiple times over, as Fairburn travelled across the Northern region. The timber was first used at the Paihia Mission Station, and then again at the Puriri Mission Station, and then lastly used to construct the Maraetai Mission Station. Local Māori built the Fairburn's raupō house, and also worked on the building of the mission station as a whole, with tasks including building other dwellings, the erecting of fences, and the construction of a boat house and a potato store.

== Mission school ==
=== Attendance ===
The mission school was established alongside the mission station, and was taught and run by Fairburn's eldest daughter Elizabeth. Initially, the school only admitted girls, and they were educated in the Fairburn's house, as it was one of the first buildings. Later on, as more buildings were built, a school for boys and infants was established. According to Fairburn's letters to the Church Missionary Society, during their first year of operation, in 1837, the mission school had an average attendance of thirteen girls and fourteen children. The following year, the men and boys school was operational following the construction of the school house, and had greatly fluctuating numbers, with average attendance no more than fourteen. In 1838 there were thirty-five children written to attend the mission school, however average attendance was twelve. Similarly, documented attendance for women and girls was forty-one, while actual attendance averaged fourteen.

=== Curriculum ===
Māori students at the school typically wore European clothes, and alongside reading, writing, and arithmetic, were also taught agricultural and domestic skills. The wife of Surveyor General Felton Matthew visited the mission school multiple times, and on 4 June 1840, observed the Māori students alongside their teach, Miss Fairburn. Their studies were deeply religious, and included reading scriptures in Te Reo Māori, and also the reading of catechisms and hymns.

=== Native teachers ===
In March 1840, Fairburn noted in a letter that the women and girls school was taught by female native teachers. There were multiple native teachers within the Maraetai Mission, one being Wiremu Hoete (William Jowett). Hoete was a Ngāti Paoa chief that took the name of the Church Missionary Society secretary following his baptism. Hoete converted to Christianity in 1838, and had a strong relationship with Fairburn, protecting him at Maraetai as well as promoting the mission. Hoete and Patene Puhata of Ngāti Paoa were leaders in worship and spiritual activities within the mission. The work of native teachers differed to that of the European missionaries, as they provided Christian instruction in the context of the Māori lifestyle.

== Sabbath attendance and baptisms ==
In 1837, Sunday attendance numbered around 65 Māori, from various tribes in the area. Between 1837 and 1841, Ngāti Paoa, led by Wiremu Hoete, crossed from Waiheke to Maraetai to attend Sunday mass, and made the return canoe journey on the following Tuesday. By 1838, the average attendance was up to 91.

There were 46 recorded baptisms in 1838, and another 46 baptisms in 1840. Of these 1840 baptisms, 27 were men, 14 were women, and 14 were children.

== Fairburn's resignation and closure ==
A committee meeting of missionaries took place at Maraetai on 1 December 1841. At this meeting William Fairburn submitted his resignation, which was accepted by the committee, and later, the Church Missionary Society in London. In his resignation letter he cites sickness and poor health, and that of his wife's, as what prompted him to retire. Resignation was also prompted due to criticisms around his large land holdings in the area.

Following retirement, the Fairburn's moved to Ōtāhuhu in 1842, with Mrs Fairburn dying in 1843. Much of the mission work was continued by Wiremu Hoete and other native teachers. No missionary took over the running of the Maraetai Mission Station, and it closed some time in 1843. Following its closure, Reverend Maunsell, who was based at Te Kohanga near Tuakau at the time, visited the area once a month.

== Bibliography ==
- La Roche, Alan (1991). The History of Howick and Pakuranga; Whitford, Bucklands and Eastern Beaches and Surrounding Districts. The Howick & Districts Historical Society.
- La Roche, Alan (2011). Grey's Folly: A History of Howick, Pakuranga, Bucklands-Eastern Beaches, East Tamaki, Whitford, Beachlands and Maraetai. Auckland: Tui Vale Productions. ISBN 978-0-473-18547-3. OCLC 1135039710. Wikidata Q118286377.
- Monin, Paul (2001). This Is My Place: Hauraki Contested 1769–1875. Wellington: Bridget Williams Book. ISBN 1-877242-19-5.
- Tonson, A. E. (1966). Old Manukau. Tonson Publishing House.
