= Motukaraka Island =

Uninhabited island in New Zealand

Motukaraka Island (Auckland)
Nickname: Flat Island
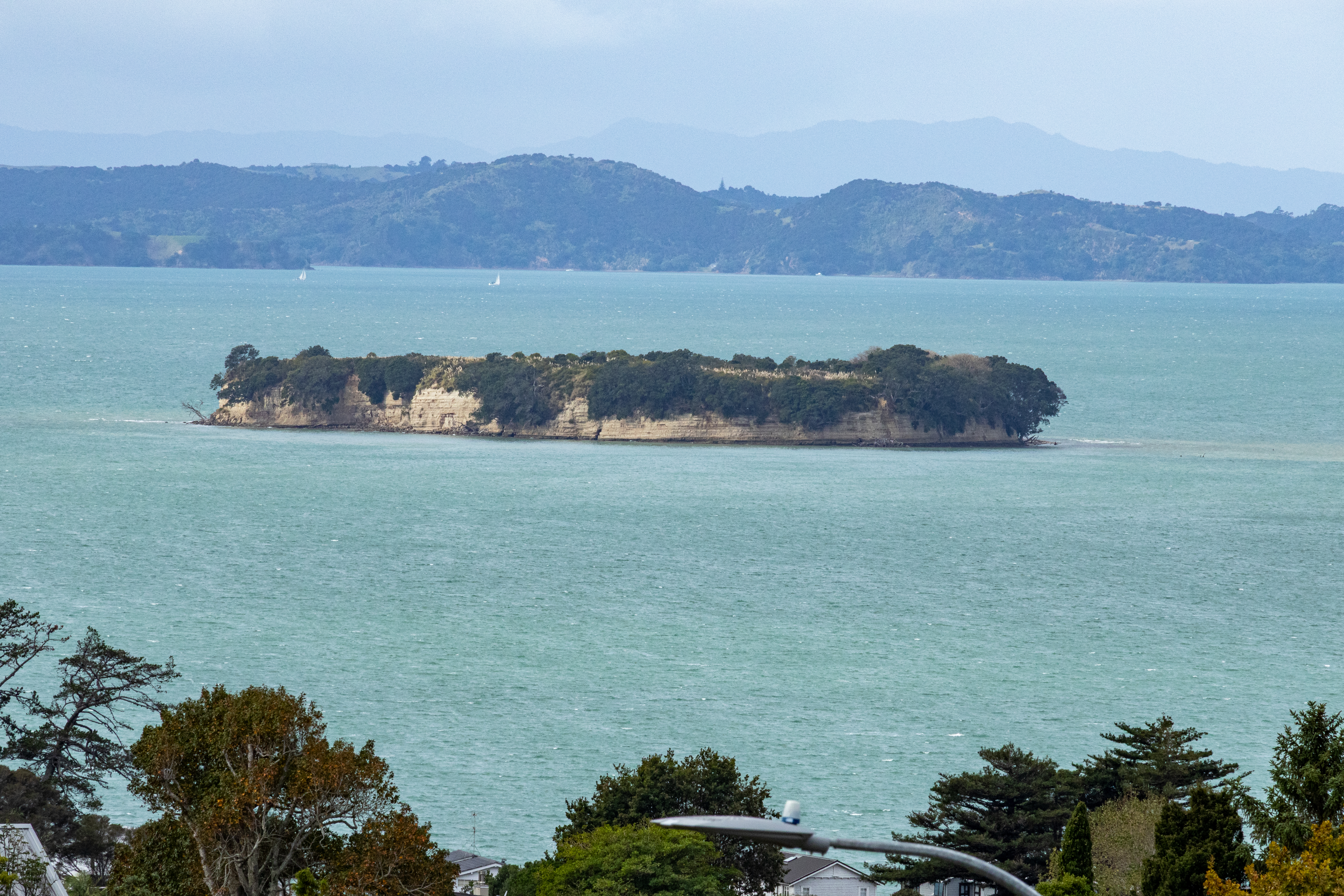
- Motukaraka Island seen from Stockade Hill, Howick
- Interactive map of Motukaraka Island (Auckland)

Geography
- Location: Hauraki Gulf
- Coordinates: 36°52′41″S 174°58′44″E
- Area: 5.7 ha (14 acres)
- Highest elevation: 15 m (49 ft)

Administration
- New Zealand

Demographics
- Population: 0

Motukaraka Island (Auckland) (Island of Karaka) is a 5.7-hectare (14-acre) uninhabited island 500 m (1,600 ft) off the coast of Beachlands in Auckland, New Zealand with historical significance and a rich history of Māori occupation.

The island is flat and approximately 15m above sea level with access from the mainland via a raised shellbank for approximately two hours either side of low tide. The rocks surrounding the island are a popular day trip and fishing destination, although access to the top of the island is difficult due to the steep cliffs around it.

There have been numerous other places named "Motukaraka" throughout New Zealand, including in the Auckland suburb of Green Bay, and in the Hokianga Harbour. Most historical accounts differentiate this island as being 'near Howick'.

== Geography ==
The island is composed of Waitemata sandstone, which formed between one and two million years ago as a section of a river valley. The flat top of the island is an uplifted terrace, which has undergone intertidal erosion.

== History ==
Historian Percy Smith records that in the late 18th century Motukaraka Island was a heavily fortified pā of about 100 members of the tribe Ngāti Pāoa. Around this time a party from Ngāti Rongo, seeking revenge for a previous attack by Ngāti Pāoa, stormed the island. They cut kauri spars to serve as scaling ladders and attacked the site at dawn. The ensuing massacre wiped out almost all inhabitants, including the Ngāti Pāoa chief Taeiwi. The island has been uninhabited since this time.

Clianthus puniceus, a critically endangered species of plant was recorded as being present on the island in the late 19th century but all expeditions since this time have not discovered the species and it is no longer endemic to the island.

Motukaraka Island was the first historic category scenic reserve in New Zealand, gazetted in March 1905. In the 1920s the island was used for various farming purposes, including growing karaka, breeding rabbits and farming potatoes, with a chute built to drop the bags of potatoes down into waiting carts. Although the island was used for farming it was not inhabited or settled.

In 1965 a fire broke out on the island and burned unchecked for three days. All plants except a few coastal pohutukawa were destroyed in the fire.

It has also been known variously as Flat Island, Motu Ika (Fish Island), and Reserve Island.

== Conservation and recreational use ==
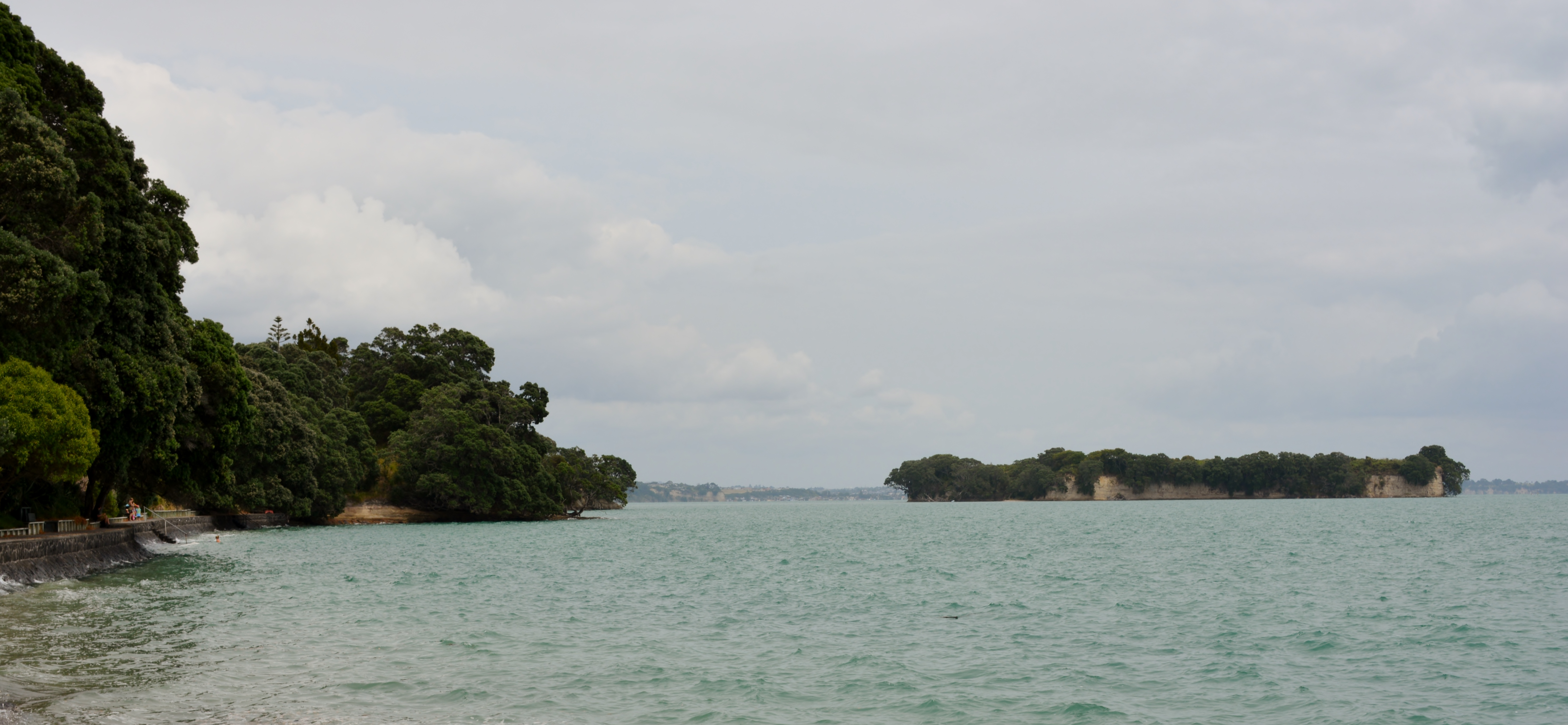
Motukaraka Island from Beachlands

Many expeditions in the 1990s and 2000s have taken place to study the recolonized flora and fauna and remove pests. Pest eradication appears to have been successful but the loss of the mature plants and trees in the fire has facilitated the growth of weeds.

At various times stairs have been present to allow easy access to the island but drainage issues and the harsh environment have required their removal. Despite this the island is a popular walk and fishing area.
