= Magazine Bay (Auckland) =

Bay in the North Island, New Zealand

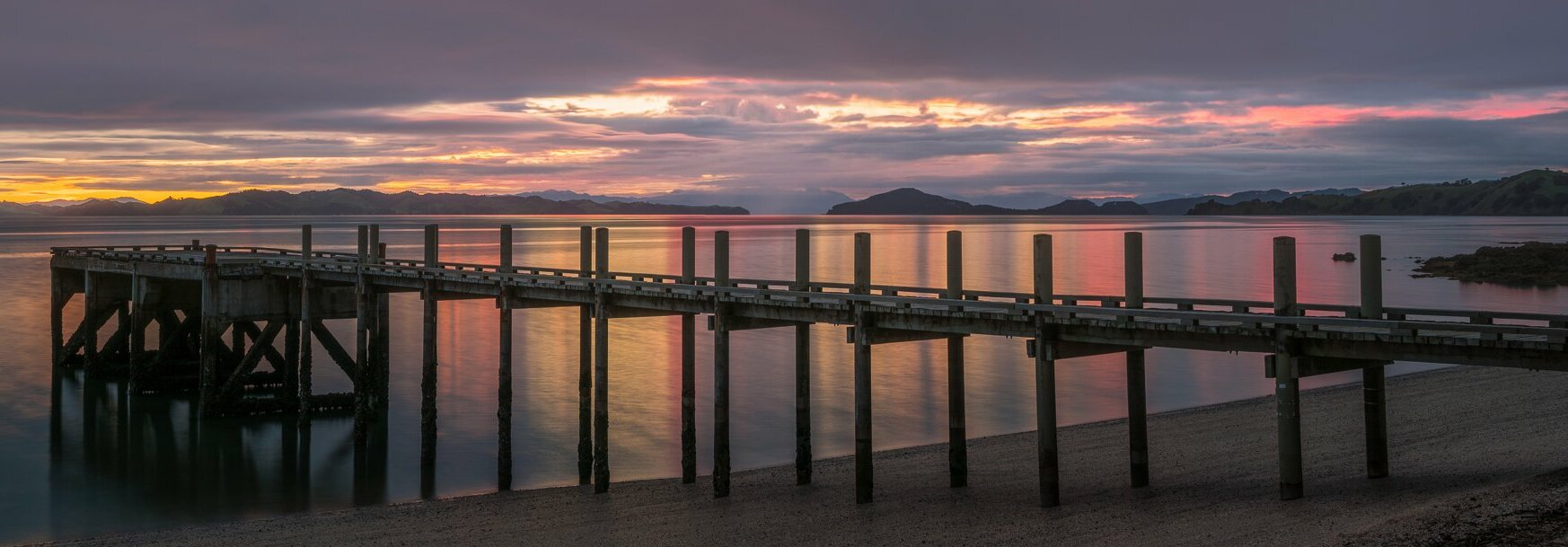
- Dawn at the Magazine Bay Wharf

- Location within the Auckland Region
- Location: Auckland Region, New Zealand
- Coordinates: 36.8838°S 175.0572°E
- Ocean/sea sources: Hauraki Gulf

Magazine Bay is a bay in the Auckland Region of New Zealand's North Island. It is located to the east of Maraetai.

== Description ==
Magazine Bay is a bay located on the Pōhukukawa Coast, close to the town of Maraetai. The bay is directly to the east of Waiomanu Beach. Magazine Bay looks out towards the Tāmaki Strait, Waiheke Island and Ponui Island.

== History ==
The traditional Ngāi Tai ki Tāmaki name for the bay is Kakaremea. The headland to the north of the bay was the location of a pā called Te Aute. Kakaremea was a part of the lands gifted by the chief Te Whatatau to the followers of his wife Te Raukohekohe in the late 1600s. A karaka tree associated with the death of Ngāi Tai and Ngāti Pāoa ancestor Māhia is located at the bay.

In 1850, a gold mine was established on the hill behind Magazine Bay. The mine operated for ten years and found very little gold, but left significant piles of clay. From 1899 to 1907, a brickworks operated at the site, using the clay from the former mine. In 1912, the Nobel Explosives Company established an explosives magazine (storage facility) at the site. The storage facility is the namesake of the bay, and during World War II the magazine was enlarged and used to store ammunition. During this period, the facility was camouflaged, and protected by home guard soldiers based at Maraetai.

Since 2010, the land adjacent to Magazine Bay and neighbouring Waiomanu Beach has been protected as a public reserve.

== Amenities ==
The bay has a wooden wharf, surrounded by mostly shallow water. Magazine Bay is the end point of the Maraetai Beach Path walkway,

== Bibliography ==
- La Roche, Alan (2011). Grey's Folly: A History of Howick, Pakuranga, Bucklands-Eastern Beaches, East Tamaki, Whitford, Beachlands and Maraetai. Auckland: Tui Vale Productions. ISBN 978-0-473-18547-3. OCLC 1135039710. Wikidata Q118286377.
