= Home Guard (New Zealand) =

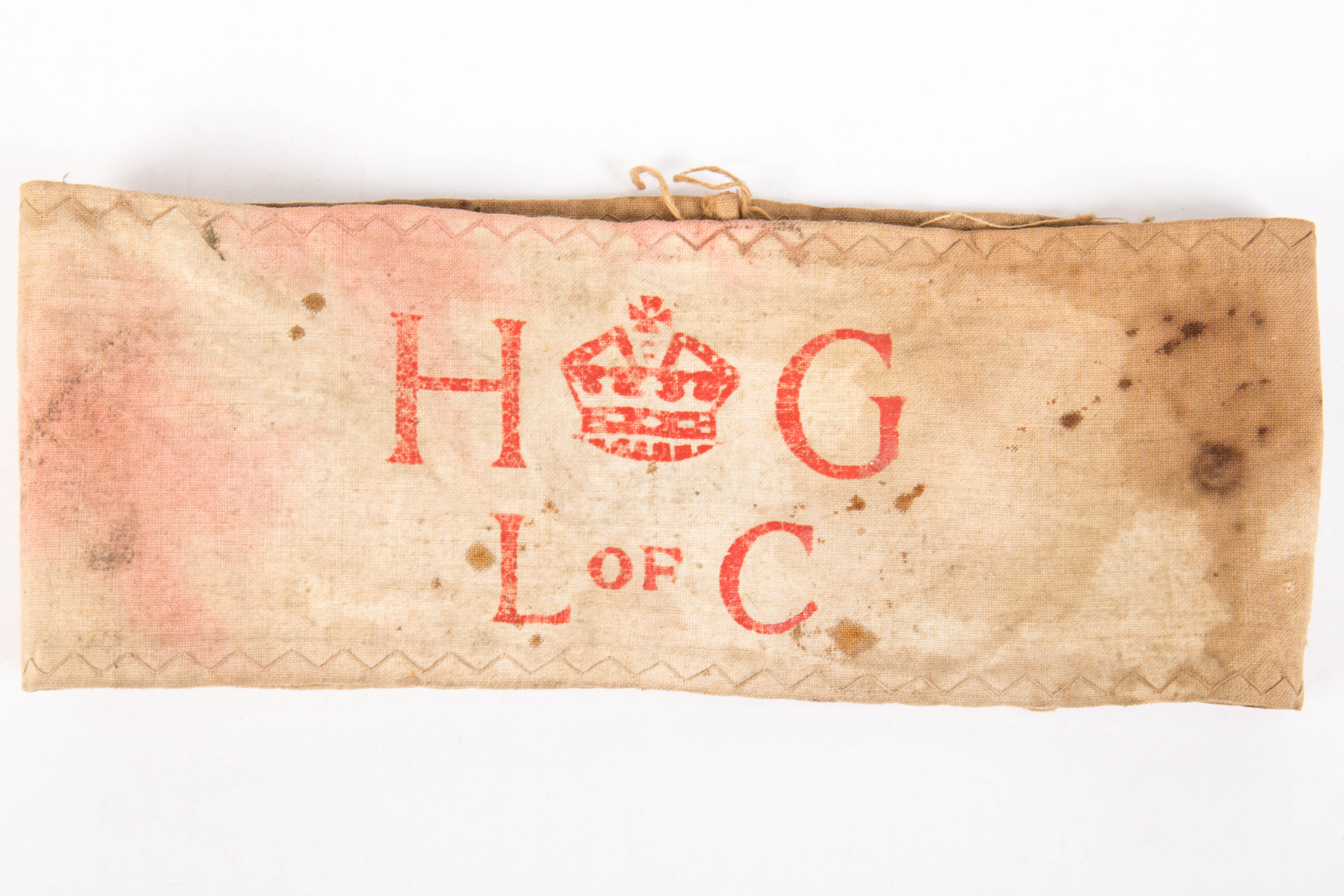
- Home Guard armband worn during World War II
- Active: August 1940 – December 1943
- Disbanded: December 1943
- Country: New Zealand
- Role: Defence from invasion

The Home Guard was a wartime armed service during the Second World War that was established with the primary objective of defending New Zealand from the threat posed by the Empire of Japan.

Within months of the outbreak of the Second World War, and mindful of the potential threat posed by the Empire of Japan, consideration was being given to the formation of a civilian force that would assist in the defence of New Zealand. The Home Guard, modelled on its British equivalent, was formed in August 1940 under the auspices of the Emergency Reserve Corps Regulations. Membership was initially voluntary, with a minimum age of 15 but no upper limit. From 1942, membership was compulsory for those in the 35 to 50 age bracket. The same year non-British subjects residing in New Zealand became eligible for the Home Guard.

One of the key responsibilities of the Home Guard was the mission of destroying any infrastructure, particularly bridges, that could be used by invading Japanese forces. In East Auckland, the Home Guard was predominantly made up of horse-mounted farmers who had been excused from war service. They carried out exercises in 1942 including one in which they tested the time taken to travel from Manukau Harbour to the Waitematā Harbour at Eastern Beach. Farmers with experience from the First World War were used to construct beach obstacles such as barbed wire entanglements and to build concrete pillboxes. Eastern Beach had such pillboxes at each end. The long wave radio station at Musick Point was provided with bomb shelters from which emergency radios could be operated. A blackout was imposed and enforced by the Home Guard. The wooden wharf at Bucklands Beach, which was believed capable of aiding a Japanese landing, was demolished in 1942.

Members of the Home Guard who served for 28 days full-time or 6 months part-time were eligible for the New Zealand War Service Medal. At the peak of its membership, the Home Guard had approximately 119,000–123,000 men.

The Home Guard participated in the manhunt of spree killer Stanley Graham in October 1941.

== See Also ==
- Home Guard (United Kingdom)
- Volunteer Defence Corps (Australia)
- Coastwatchers
- Auxiliary Units
- Veterans Guard of Canada
- Pacific Coast Militia Rangers

== Bibliography ==
- Taylor, Nancy (1986). The New Zealand People at War: The Home Front, Volume 1. Wellington: Department of Internal Affairs. ISBN 0-477-01259-0.
