= East Auckland =

Region of Auckland, New Zealand

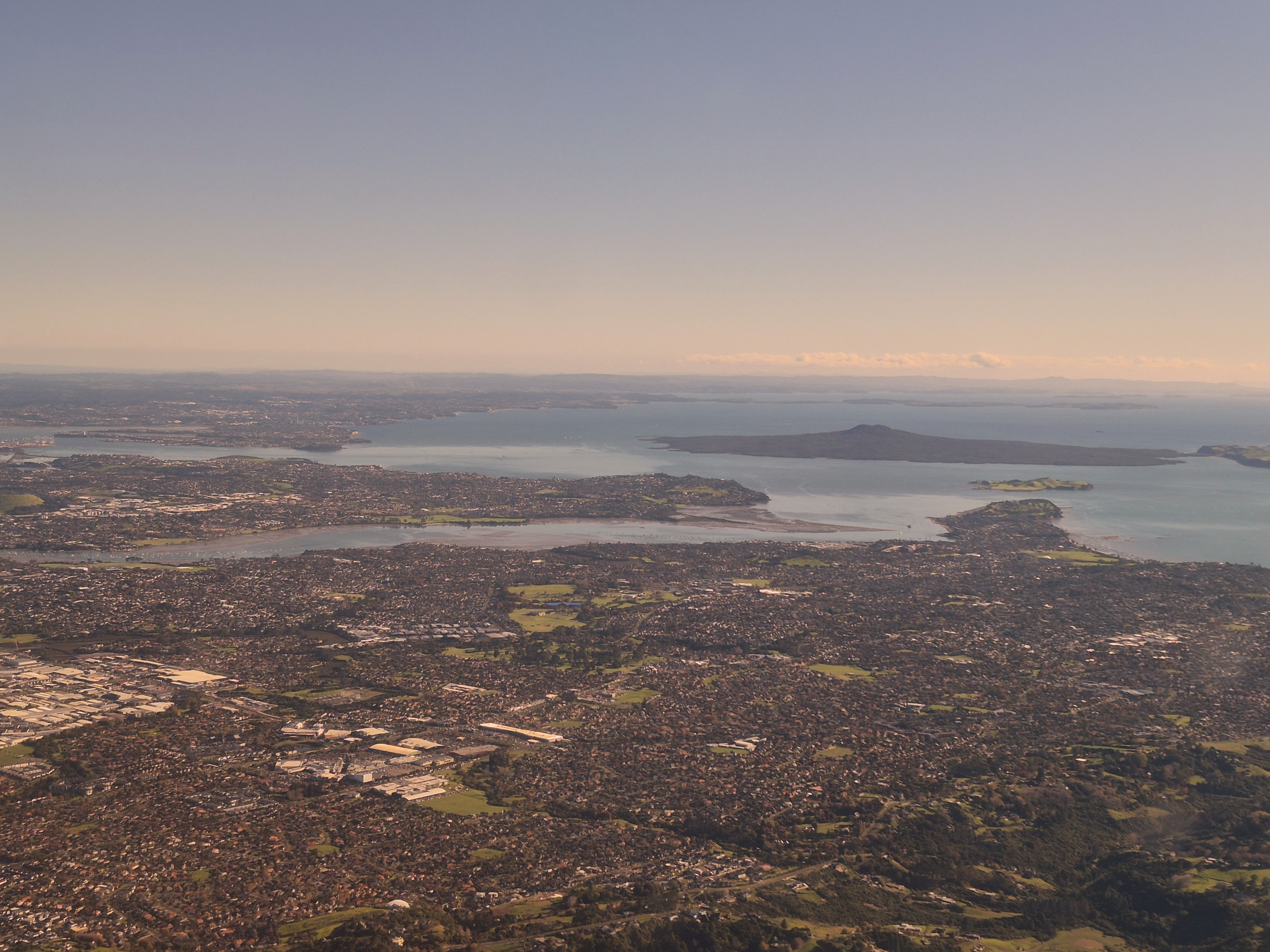
- An aerial view of some of the suburbs traditionally considered East Auckland, including Pakuranga, Bucklands Beach, Howick and Botany Downs.

- Location in the Auckland Region
- Coordinates: 36°55′S 174°55′E
- Country: New Zealand
- Island: North Island
- Region: Auckland Region
- NZ Parliament: Botany; Pakuranga

Government
  - MPs: Simeon Brown (National); Christopher Luxon (National)

Area
  - Total: 69.70 km^{2} (26.91 sq mi)

Population (2023 estimation)
  - Total: 157,700
  - Density: 2,263/km^{2} (5,860/sq mi)

East Auckland (Māori: Te Rāwhiti o Tāmaki Makaurau) is one of the major geographical regions of Auckland, the largest city in New Zealand. Settled in the 14th century, the area is part of the traditional lands of Ngāi Tai ki Tāmaki. The area was developed into farmland in the 1840s, and the town of Howick was established as a defensive outpost by fencibles (retired British Army soldiers) to protect Auckland. Coastal holiday communities developed in the area from the 1910s, and from the 1950s underwent major redevelopment into a suburban area of greater Auckland. From the 1980s, the area saw significant Asian New Zealander migrant communities develop.

== Definition and names ==
Most definitions of East Auckland include the Howick local board area, which includes suburbs such as Botany, Bucklands Beach, Howick, Flat Bush and Pakuranga. Sometimes suburbs of the eastern Auckland isthmus are included in the definition, such as Glen Innes, Panmure and Point England, and the Pōhutukawa Coast. Other areas occasionally referred to as East Auckland include Saint Heliers, Ellerslie, Mission Bay, Mount Wellington and Remuera.

The first references to East Auckland come from the 1970s, referring to Glen Innes. The term East Auckland for areas near Howick entered popular use in the 1990s.

The name East Tāmaki was used in the 19th century to refer to the East Auckland area.

== Natural history ==
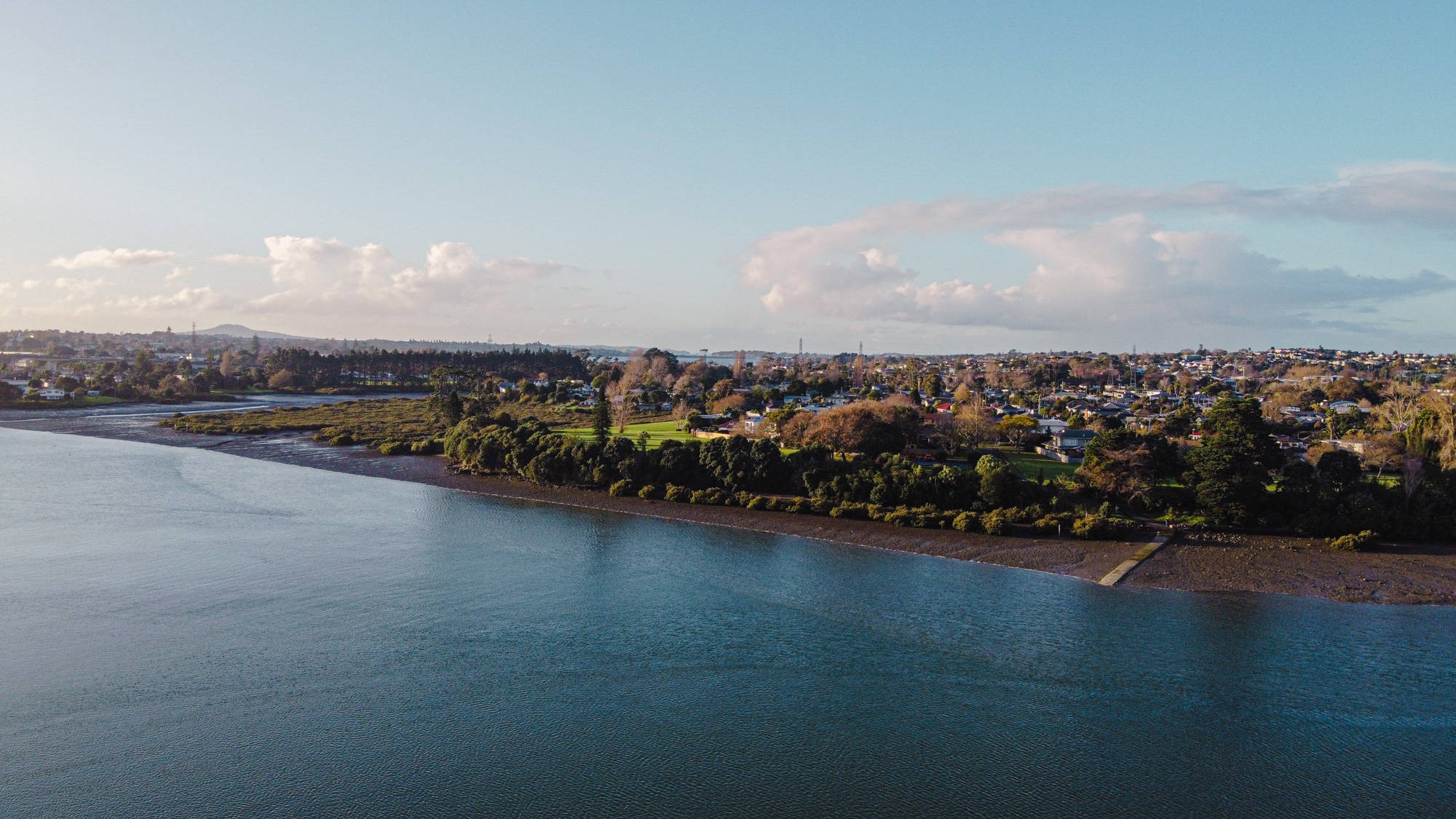
The Tāmaki River is a major geographic feature of East Auckland

Much of metropolitan East Auckland is a peninsula, bordered by the Tāmaki River to the west, the Tāmaki Strait of the Hauraki Gulf, and the Mangemangeroa Creek in the east. The peninsula tapers into a headland in the north called Musick Point / Te Naupata. The area is primarily formed from Waitemata sandstone that was laid down in the Early Miocene era. The northern cliffs of Eastern Beach feature some of the most noticeable anticline folding in the Auckland Region. Many areas of East Auckland that border Botany Creek, Pakuranga Creek and Tāmaki River are formed from alluvial soils.

Features of the Auckland volcanic field are present in East Auckland, including Ōhuiarangi / Pigeon Mountain, Ōtara Hill, Green Hill and Styaks Swamp. These features erupted in an estimated period between 57,000 and 20,000 years ago. Because of these eruptions, significant areas of Half Moon Bay and East Tāmaki are formed from basalt tuff and lava flows. A lava flow from the volcano from Styaks Swamp forms the southern boundary of the Pakuranga Creek at Burswood.

The Tāmaki River is a drowned river valley system, which formed at the end of the Last Glacial Maximum (known locally as the Ōtira Glaciation), between 12,000 and 7,000 years ago as sea levels rose. Prior to human settlement, the area was primarily a broadleaf podocarp forest, home to tree species such as tōtara, mataī, tawa, pōhutukawa, rewarewa, māhoe and taraire. By the 19th century, the area was primarily bracken fern scrubland, and in the 1850s the area was transformed into English-style farmland, dominated by pasture and poplar, oak and willow trees.

== Human context ==
=== Māori history ===
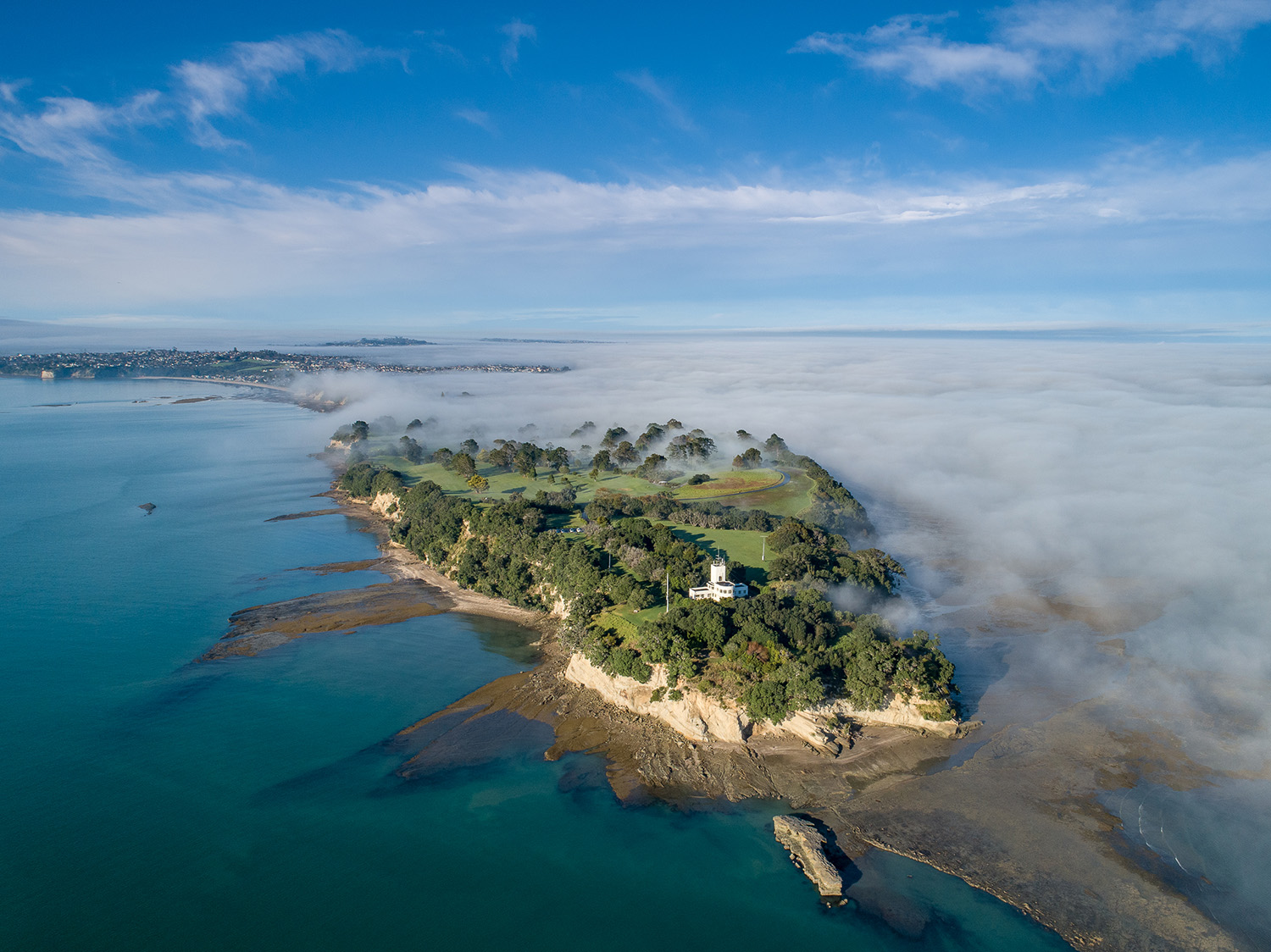
Musick Point / Te Naupata was the location of Te Waiārohia, a major defensive pā in the 18th century

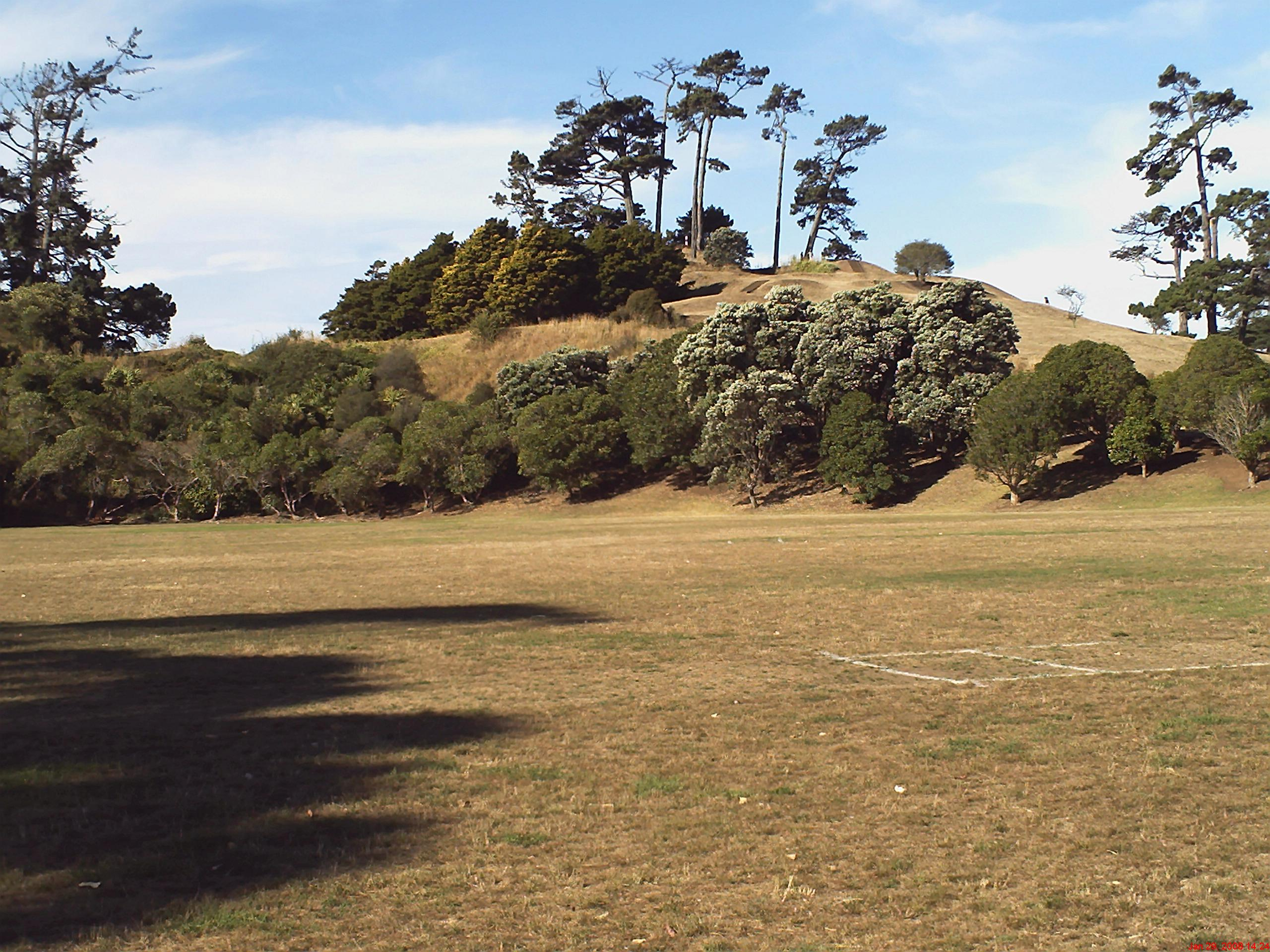
Ōhuiarangi / Pigeon Mountain was an important defended pā site for Ngāi Tai ki Tāmaki, surrounded by stonefield gardens

The Tāmaki Strait was visited by the Tainui migratory waka around the year 1300, and members of the crew settled around modern East Auckland and the Pōhutukawa Coast. These were the ancestors of the modern mana whenua of the area, Ngāi Tai ki Tāmaki. Waipaparoa was the traditional name for the wider bay between modern-day Howick and Beachlands, while the mouth of the Tāmaki River was traditionally known as Te Wai ō Tāiki ("The Waters of Tāiki"), named after the Ngāi Tai ancestor Tāiki. Tāiki settled with his followers along the eastern shores of the Tāmaki River, alongside the descendants of Huiārangi of the early iwi Te Tini ō Maruiwi. The upper reaches of the river near modern Pakuranga is traditionally known as Te Wai Mokoia, referring to Mokoikahikuwaru, a protector taniwha of the Tainui waka who is described in legends as taking up residence at the Panmure Basin. The Tāmaki River settlements were important due to their proximity to Te Tō Waka, the portage at Ōtāhuhu where waka could easily cross into the Manukau Harbour. Many ara (trails) across East Auckland may have begun life as moa trails.

Ngāi Tai centred life in the area between the Tāmaki and Wairoa rivers, settling in an annual cycle of encampments based on what resources were seasonally available. Traditional resources included fish, shellfish, snared birds and processed karaka berries. The coasts were widely cultivated, where crops such as kūmara, taro, hue gourd and uwhi were grown. Volcanic soils, especially those found at Ōtara Hill and the Pakuranga Creek, were home to the most extensive stonefield gardens, most of which have since been destroyed. Ōhuiarangi / Pigeon Mountain was an important pā site for Ngāi Tai ki Tāmaki, named after ancestress Huiārangi, daughter of Tāmaki of Te Tini ō Maruiwi. Pā sites were constricted to the east: Paparoa at Waipaparoa / Howick Beach and Tūwakamana at Cockle Bay, to protect the exposed cultivations of the area. In the 1600s, the warrior Kāwharu attacked and raised Paparoa Pā, without taking occupation of the lands. While the wider area was still cultivated, the site of Paparoa Pā became a wāhi tapu (sacred and restricted) site to Ngāi Tai.

From the 1600s, Ngāi Tai intermarried with Ngāti Tamaterā. Not long after this time, members of Ngāitai from the Bay of Plenty who had shared ancestry with Ngāi Tai migrated to the region. Their arrival was celebrated, and the lands near Umupuia became a shared gift for Ngāitai and Ngāi Tai ki Tāmaki peoples. Te Wana, a child of this union, became a well-known warrior, who united the peoples of Ngāi Tai. In the 1700s, Ngāi Tai ki Tāmaki forged unions between other Tāmaki Māori iwi, such as Te Uri o Pou, Waiohua, and Marutūāhu, which caused division between members of Ngāi Tai.

In the early-mid 18th century, Ngāriki, a rangatira of Ngāi Tai, built a fortified pā at Te Naupata (Musick Point), the headland at the end of the peninsula, called Te Waiārohia (a shortening of Te Waiārohia ō Ngāriki), which grew to become one of the largest centres of Ngāi Tai life. From the 1790s, Te Rangitāwhia was the paramount chief of Ngāi Tai, whose principal residences were at Waiārohia and to the south at Ōhuiarangi / Pigeon Mountain. After the village was attacked by Kapetaua of the related iwi Te Patukirikiri, Ngāi Tai built a smaller pā on the mountain. By the mid-18th century, Ngāti Pāoa, a Marutūāhu tribe with close relationships to Ngāi Tai, established themselves on the western shores of the river at Panmure, at Mokoia pā and the Mauināina kāinga. By the time missionaries Samuel Marsden and John Gare Butler visited the isthmus in 1820, there were thousands of inhabitants living along the shores of the Tāmaki River.

The first regular contact Māori of East Auckland had with Europeans was with whalers, who visited the area from the 1780s. The visits led to outbreaks of rewharewha, a respiratory disease, which decimated many Ngāi Tai settlements.

During the Musket Wars in the 1820s, the settlements of Ngāti Pāoa and Ngāi Tai were sacked by a Ngāpuhi taua (war party). The wider area was evacuated by Ngāti Pāoa and Ngāi Tai, with most members of Ngāi Tai fleeing to the Waikato for temporary refuge during this time. When English missionary William Thomas Fairburn visited the area in 1833, it was mostly unoccupied. The settlements of Mokoia, Mauināina and Te Waiārohia became tapu for Ngāti Pāoa and Ngāi Tai due to the large number of deaths, and were not resettled.

In 1836, English Missionary William Thomas Fairburn brokered a land sale between Tāmaki Māori chiefs, Pōtatau Te Wherowhero and Turia of Ngāti Te Rau, covering the majority of modern-day South Auckland, East Auckland and the Pōhutukawa Coast. The sale was envisioned by the church and the chiefs as a way to end hostilities in the area, but it is unclear what the chiefs understood or consented to. Māori continued to live in the area, unchanged by this sale. Fairburn's Purchase was investigated by the New Zealand Land Commission found to be excessive and reduced in size. Most of the disallowed parts of his purchase were not returned to Ngāi Tai, instead were kept by the Government to sell to settlers.

=== Early European settlement ===
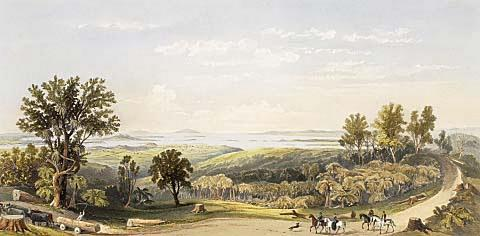
Watercolour of Howick village and the Waitematā Harbour in 1862

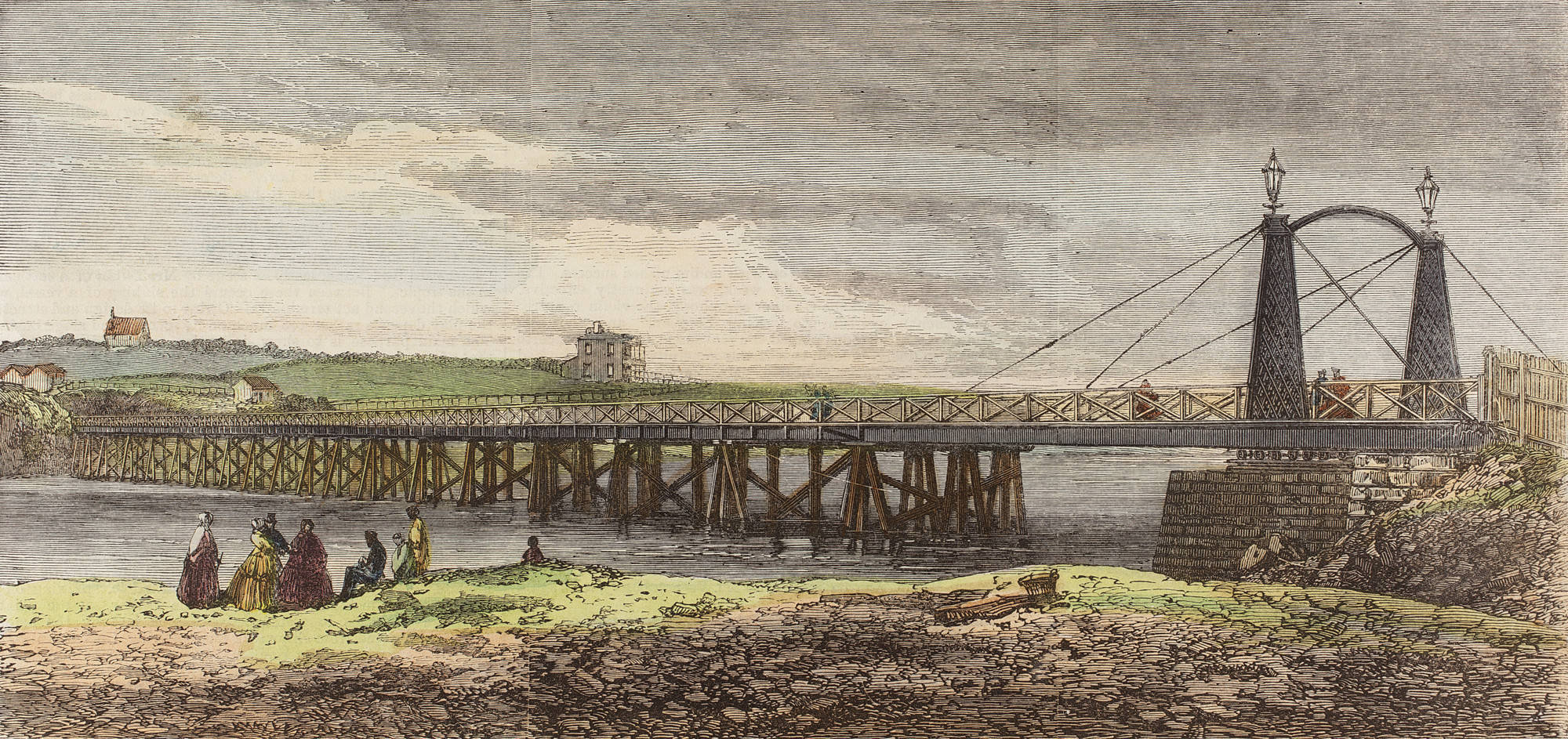
Lithograph of the first Panmure Bridge in 1867

Fairburn established a mission at Maraetai in 1837, where he taught reading, writing and spread Christianity among Ngāi Tai and Ngāti Pāoa. Fairburn resigned from the mission in 1841, and the mission was continued on Wiremu Hoete, until late 1843. Many Ngāi Tai and Ngāti Pāoa lived at the mission, and the farm surrounding the mission became one of the first farms in Auckland. The New Zealand Government began selling sections around Pakuranga in 1843, some of which were farmed by Joseph Hargreaves, who bought 82 acres in 1843 and constructed the first European house in the area, and by Hemi Pepene, a Ngāpuhi orphan who grew up at the Paihia Mission Station and was taken care of by the Fairburns.

Howick was established in 1847 as a defensive outpost for Auckland, by fencibles (retired British Army soldiers) and their families. The decision to establish on site was controversial. It was allegedly chosen to protect Auckland against potential invasion from Marutūāhu tribes to the east, but the site was too far inland to serve this purpose. As the Crown owned the entirety of the land at Howick, the Government could directly profit from the land sales to fencible settlers. The fencibles arrived between 1847 and 1852. Early settlers struggled to establish themselves on the land. Almost no trees were found in the district that could be used for construction, and the soil was primarily clay, compared to other fencible settlements such as Ōtāhuhu and Panmure that were established on volcanic soils more suitable for farming. The Government was widely criticised for not providing many employment opportunities for the fencible settlers. Early settlers often found work on Government projects such as road construction, drainage or clearing allotments, while others worked for farmers. Many fencibles lived in Auckland for work, but were obliged to return to Howick on Sundays, otherwise they could be charged with mutiny under the Fencibles Act.

Howick grew to become a service centre for the surrounding rural areas. The settlers were dependent on water transport and ferry services, until the construction of the Panmure Bridge across the Tāmaki River in 1865. Wheat, potatoes and butter were important industries for the early settlers.

In April 1861, news reached Howick of the imminent Invasion of the Waikato. By July 1863, a defensive blockhouse was constructed at Stockade Hill, In September 1863, the Ngāi Tai village of Ōtau near Clevedon was attacked by the British army, and the village was evacuated, with people moving to communities at the river's mouth. While Māori of South Auckland such as Te Ākitai Waiohua were forced to leave, Ngāi Tai were designated as a "friendly" people by the Crown, and remained neutral in the fighting. After the Native Lands Act of 1865, the Native Land Court confiscated many Ngāi Tai lands. The remaining land was individuated, slowly sold on to European farmers.

In 1865, the capital of New Zealand was moved from Auckland to Wellington. This caused major financial problems for the residents of Howick, as income from butter dropped and land prices plummeted. In 1874, the Pakuranga Hunt was established, and by 1900 had become one of the largest social clubs in Auckland. The Hunt was based in East Tāmaki, organising hare hunts and country balls for the wider area. By 1960, the hunt had relocated Karaka.

In the late 19th and early 20th centuries, the wheat fields of the area were gradually replaced with dairy farms. In the 1910s and 1920s, areas such as Bucklands Beach, Eastern Beach, Shelly Park and Cockle Bay became a popular holidaying destinations for Aucklanders. Suburban housing was constructed, and seasonal holiday communities developed around these beaches.

=== Suburban development ===
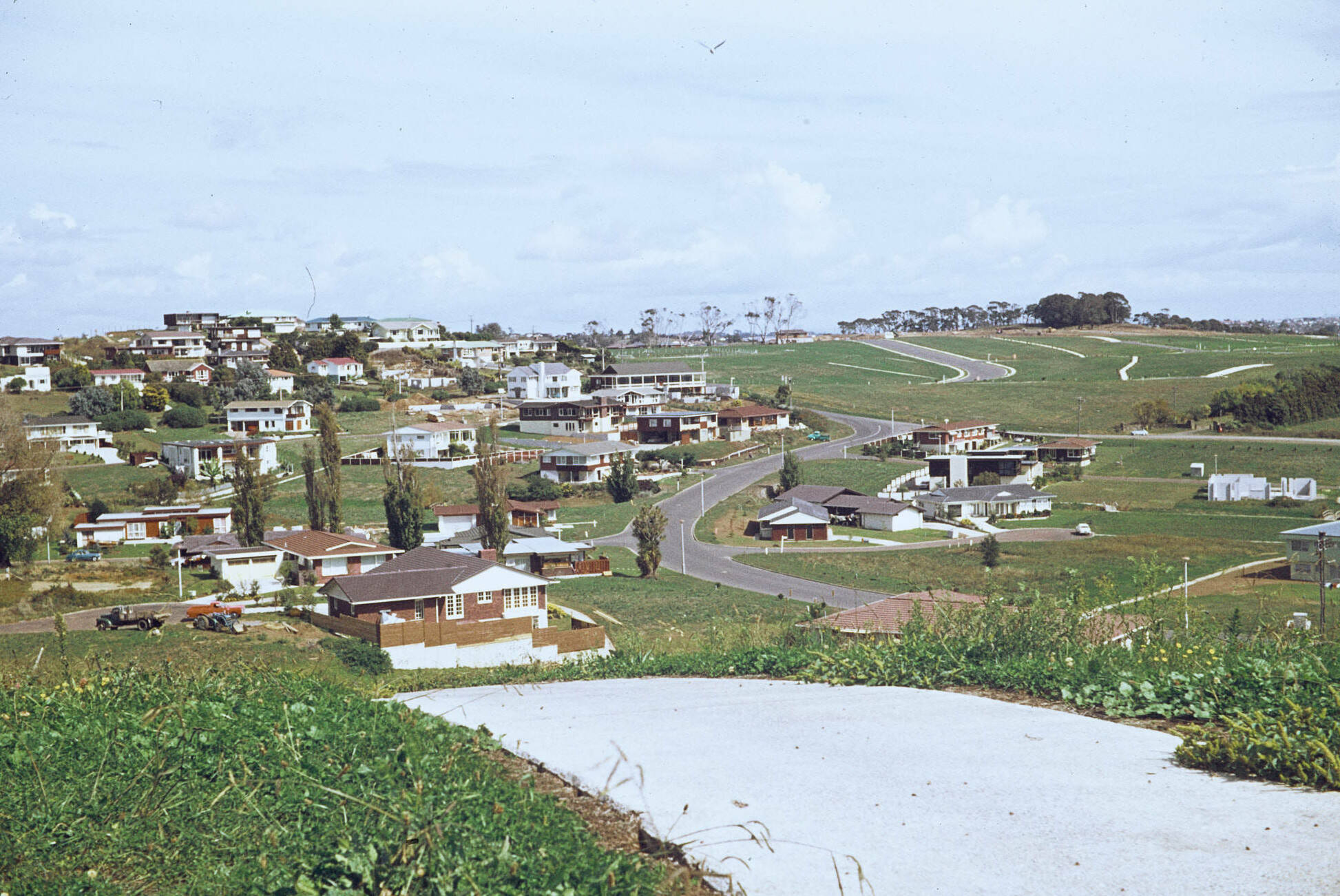
New housing developing at Half Moon Bay in 1973

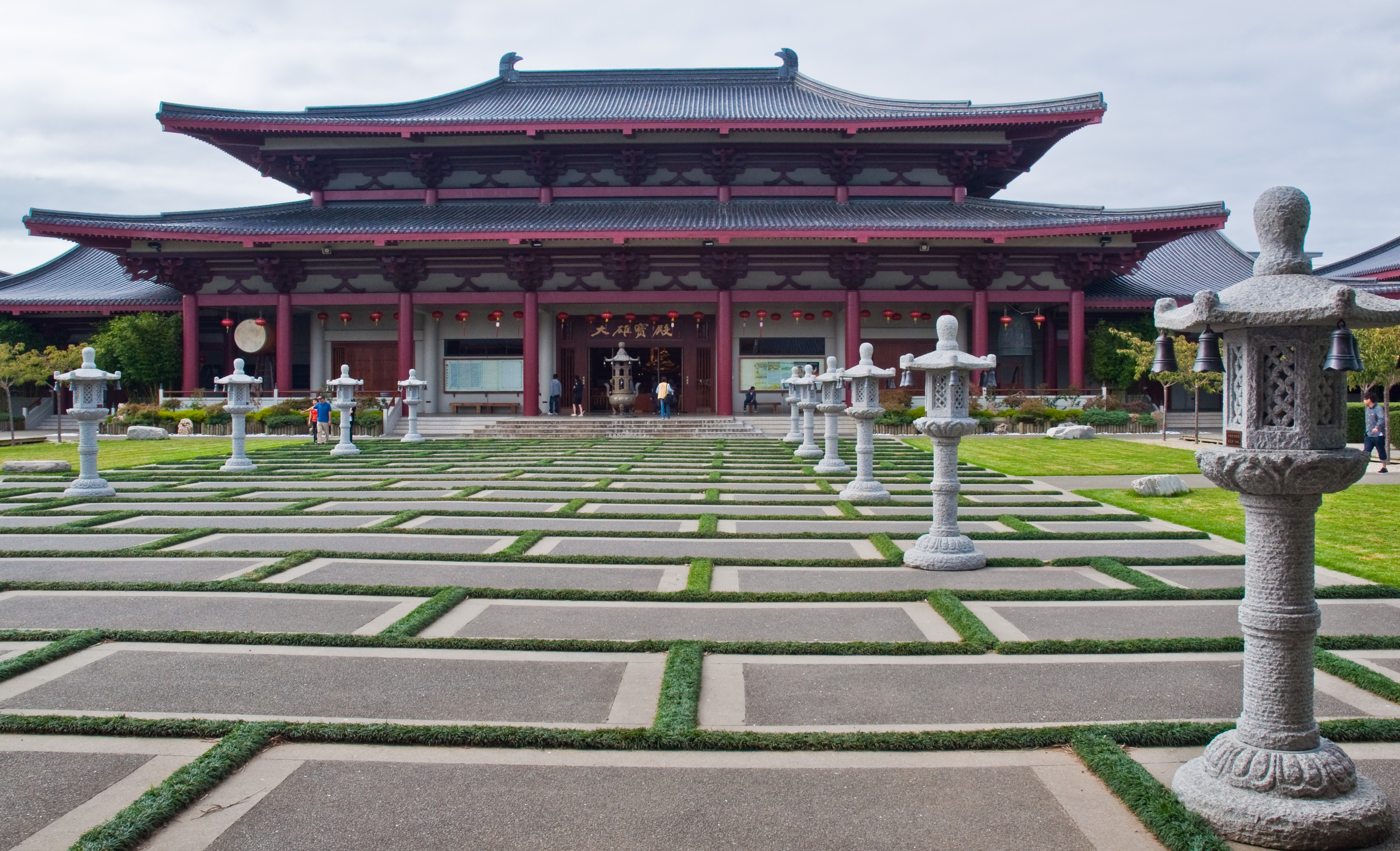
Fo Guang Shan Temple, the largest Buddhist temple in New Zealand

In the 1930s, the road to Howick was concreted, improving transport times for milk to Auckland, and for passengers into the area. This led to Howick developing into a commuter suburb, for people working in Penrose, Westfield and Ōtāhuhu. During World War II, pillboxes and defenses were built along the coastline and major roadways of the area by the Home Guard. In March 1942 the Japanese submarine I-25 operated in the Hauraki Gulf, and a Yokosuka E14Y floatplane flown by Nobuo Fujita conducted reconnaissance flights over Howick and Beachlands on 13 March, leaving shortly afterwards. In 1948, Pakuranga was considered as a potential site for the new international airport, which eventually opened in Māngere.

In 1952, Howick split from the Manukau County to form its own borough. Major suburban growth occurred in East Auckland from the 1950s to the 1970s, including the development of many new suburbs surrounding Howick and Pakuranga. In 1965, the Pakuranga Town Centre (now known as Pakuranga Plaza) was officially opened. It was the second modern American-style mall constructed in Auckland.

In 1964, a new eastern city centred around Howick was proposed, covering the modern Howick local board area and the Pōhutukawa Coast. These areas were merged into the newly founded Manukau City in 1965, and the Local Government Commission scuttled plans for an eastern city in 1972.

In the 1980s and 1990s, East Auckland developed significant Asian migrant communities. Entrepreneur Kit Wong, inspired by his parents' experiences of isolation living in Auckland, developed commercial and restaurant spaces in Meadowlands and Somerville as spaces for Chinese New Zealander communities to develop. In 2007, Fo Guang Shan Temple, the largest Buddhist temple in New Zealand, was opened in Flat Bush.

In 1981 Lloyd Elsmore Park, a multi-purpose urban park, sporting facility and home to the Howick Historical Village, was officially opened. The Botany Town Centre shopping precinct opened in 2001.

In the mid-2000s, new large-scale housing subdivisions were constructed to the south, including Flat Bush, Dannemora and East Tāmaki Heights. Ormiston Town Centre was officially opened to the public in 2021. The Flat Bush area is expected to grow to 40,000 residents by 2025. The Eastern Busway, a project to link Botany to Panmure by rapid transport, began construction in 2019. The busway opened to Pakuranga in 2021, with the entire project scheduled to open by the mid-2020s.

== Local government ==
Road boards were the first local government in South Auckland in the 1860s, which were established across the Auckland Province due to a lack of central government funding for road improvements. The Pakuranga, Howick Township, Paparoa, East Tamaki and Turanga highway boards were established to administer upkeep for major arterial connections. In 1876, the Manukau County was established as the local government for South and East Auckland.

By 1921, Howick had grown to become a town district, and in 1952 split from the Manukau County to form the Borough of Howick. In 1956, Pakuranga was established as a county town. This was merged into the newly established Manukau City in 1965. As a part of the 1989 New Zealand local government reforms, Howick Borough was incorporated into Manukau City.

In November 2010, all cities and districts of the Auckland Region were amalgamated into a single body, governed by the Auckland Council. Within the new system, East Auckland became primarily administered by the Howick Local Board. In addition to the local board, two counsellors represent East Auckland on the Auckland Council. Voters in the Howick ward, an area with the same borders as the Howick Local Board area, vote for two councillors.

== Demographics ==
The Howick ward of East Auckland covers 69.70 km^{2} (26.91 sq mi) (Note: The Howick ward and Howick Local Board areas are co-terminous.) and had an estimated population of and had an estimated population of 173,200 as of June 2025, with a population density of 2,485 people per km^{2}.

Historical population
Year	Pop.	±% p.a.
2006	113,505	—
2013	127,125	+1.63%
2018	140,970	+2.09%
2023	153,570	+1.73%

Howick ward had a population of 153,570 in the 2023 New Zealand census, an increase of 12,600 people (8.9%) since the 2018 census, and an increase of 26,445 people (20.8%) since the 2013 census. There were 75,996 males, 77,190 females and 381 people of other genders in 47,061 dwellings. 2.5% of people identified as LGBTIQ+. The median age was 38.1 years (compared with 38.1 years nationally). There were 29,202 people (19.0%) aged under 15 years, 29,346 (19.1%) aged 15 to 29, 73,104 (47.6%) aged 30 to 64, and 21,915 (14.3%) aged 65 or older.

People could identify as more than one ethnicity. The results were 38.1% European (Pākehā); 6.3% Māori; 8.0% Pasifika; 52.5% Asian; 2.8% Middle Eastern, Latin American and African New Zealanders (MELAA); and 2.7% other, which includes people giving their ethnicity as "New Zealander". English was spoken by 88.6%, Māori language by 1.1%, Samoan by 2.1%, and other languages by 43.3%. No language could be spoken by 2.1% (e.g. too young to talk). New Zealand Sign Language was known by 0.3%. The percentage of people born overseas was 55.5, compared with 28.8% nationally.

Religious affiliations were 32.4% Christian, 7.2% Hindu, 3.5% Islam, 0.3% Māori religious beliefs, 3.6% Buddhist, 0.2% New Age, 0.1% Jewish, and 4.3% other religions. People who answered that they had no religion were 42.6%, and 5.9% of people did not answer the census question.

Of those at least 15 years old, 39,618 (31.9%) people had a bachelor's or higher degree, 49,611 (39.9%) had a post-high school certificate or diploma, and 35,130 (28.2%) people exclusively held high school qualifications. The median income was $44,900, compared with $41,500 nationally. 17,046 people (13.7%) earned over $100,000 compared to 12.1% nationally. The employment status of those at least 15 was that 66,246 (53.3%) people were employed full-time, 14,814 (11.9%) were part-time, and 3,156 (2.5%) were unemployed.

== Bibliography ==
- Alexander, Ruth; Gibson, Gail; la Roche, Alan (1997). The Royal New Zealand Fencibles, 1847–1852. New Zealand Fencible Society. ISBN 0473047160.
- Ballara, Angela (2003). "Tāmaki-makau-rau (Auckland isthmus)". Taua: 'musket wars', 'land wars' or tikanga?: warfare in Maori society in the early nineteenth century. Auckland: Penguin. ISBN 9780143018896.
- Bloomfield, G.T. (1973). The Evolution of Local Government Areas in Metropolitan Auckland, 1840–1971. Auckland University Press, Oxford University Press. ISBN 0-19-647714-X.
- Hayward, Bruce W. (2017). Out of the Ocean, Into the Fire. Geoscience Society of New Zealand. ISBN 978-0-473-39596-4.
- Jenkins, David (1992). Battle Surface! Japan's Submarine War Against Australia 1942–44. Milsons Point NSW Australia: Random House Australia. ISBN 0-09-182638-1.
- La Roche, Alan (2011). Grey's Folly: A History of Howick, Pakuranga, Bucklands-Eastern Beaches, East Tamaki, Whitford, Beachlands and Maraetai. Auckland: Tui Vale Productions. ISBN 978-0-473-18547-3. OCLC 1135039710. Wikidata Q118286377.
- La Roche, John (2011). "Tamaki River Bridge, Panmure". In La Roche, John (ed.). Evolving Auckland: The City's Engineering Heritage. Wily Publications. ISBN 9781927167038.
