= Eastern Beach, New Zealand =

Eastern Beach
- Suburb
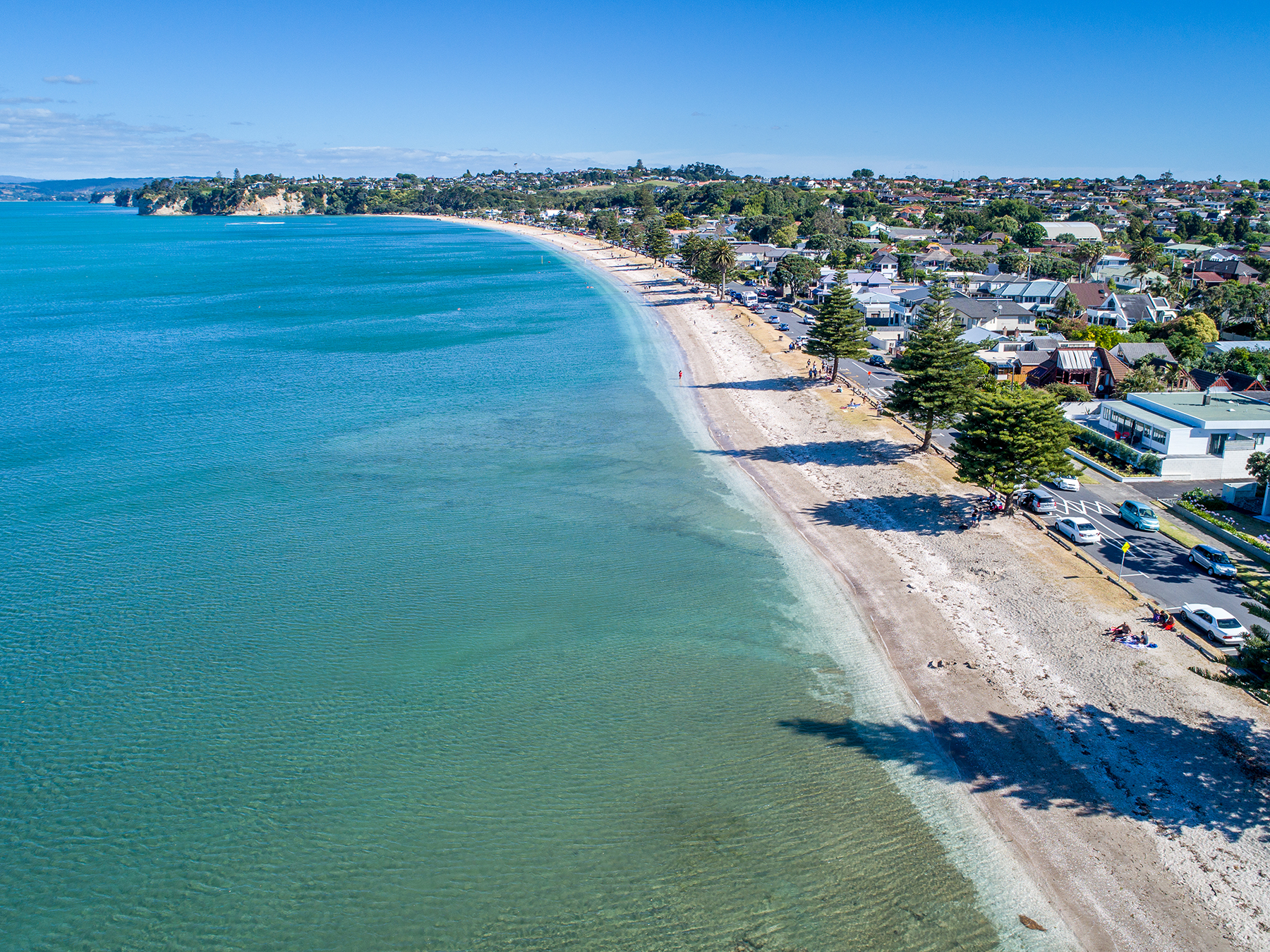
- Eastern Beach Aerial Photo
- Interactive map of Eastern Beach
- Coordinates: 36.8737°S 174.9094°E
- Country: New Zealand
- City: Auckland
- Local authority: Auckland Council
- Electoral ward: Howick ward
- Local board: Howick Local Board

Area
  - Land: 118 ha (290 acres)

Population (June 2025)
  - Total: 2,340
  - Density: 1,980/km^{2} (5,140/sq mi)

Bucklands Beach	Bucklands Beach	(Waitematā Harbour)
Bucklands Beach	Eastern Beach	(Waitematā Harbour)
Half Moon Bay	Howick	Mellons Bay

Eastern Beach is a suburb of Auckland, New Zealand. Located on the eastern city of the city centre, the suburb is in the Howick ward, one of the thirteen administrative divisions of Auckland City. Its most common attraction is a popular white-sand palm fringed beach, also called Eastern Beach, with summer temperatures attracting thousands of people from neighbouring suburbs to the beach to enjoy the shallow waters, and shops and parks within close vicinity. At the southern end of the beach is a boat ramp giving high-medium tide access to the dedicated water skiing zone adjacent to the beach. This was a popular area for gathering Pipi and Cockles, but overuse has seen a rāhui or ban placed on the beach. It is part of the Bucklands Beach peninsula.

== Geography ==
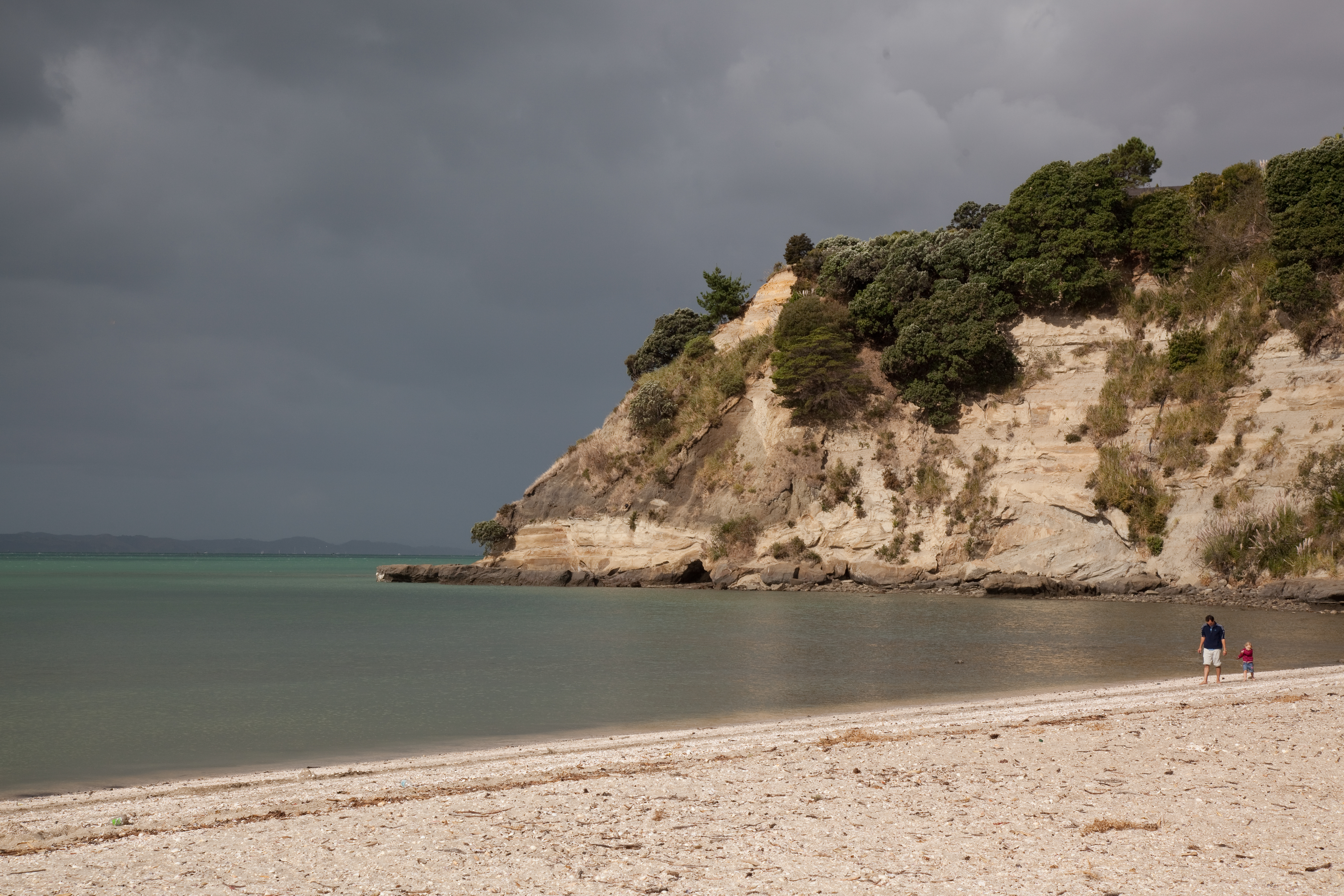
Waitemata sandstone cliffs at the eastern end of Eastern Beach

Eastern Beach is located on the eastern side of a peninsula between the Tāmaki River and the Tāmaki Strait of the Hauraki Gulf, on the opposite side to Bucklands Beach. The beach looks out towards the Tāmaki Strait and Waiheke Island. The area is primarily formed from Waitemata sandstone. Anticline folding of the layers of sandstone can be seen along the cliffs of the beach, and Macleans Reserve is the location of a chenier plain, a large bed of fossilised shells.

== History ==
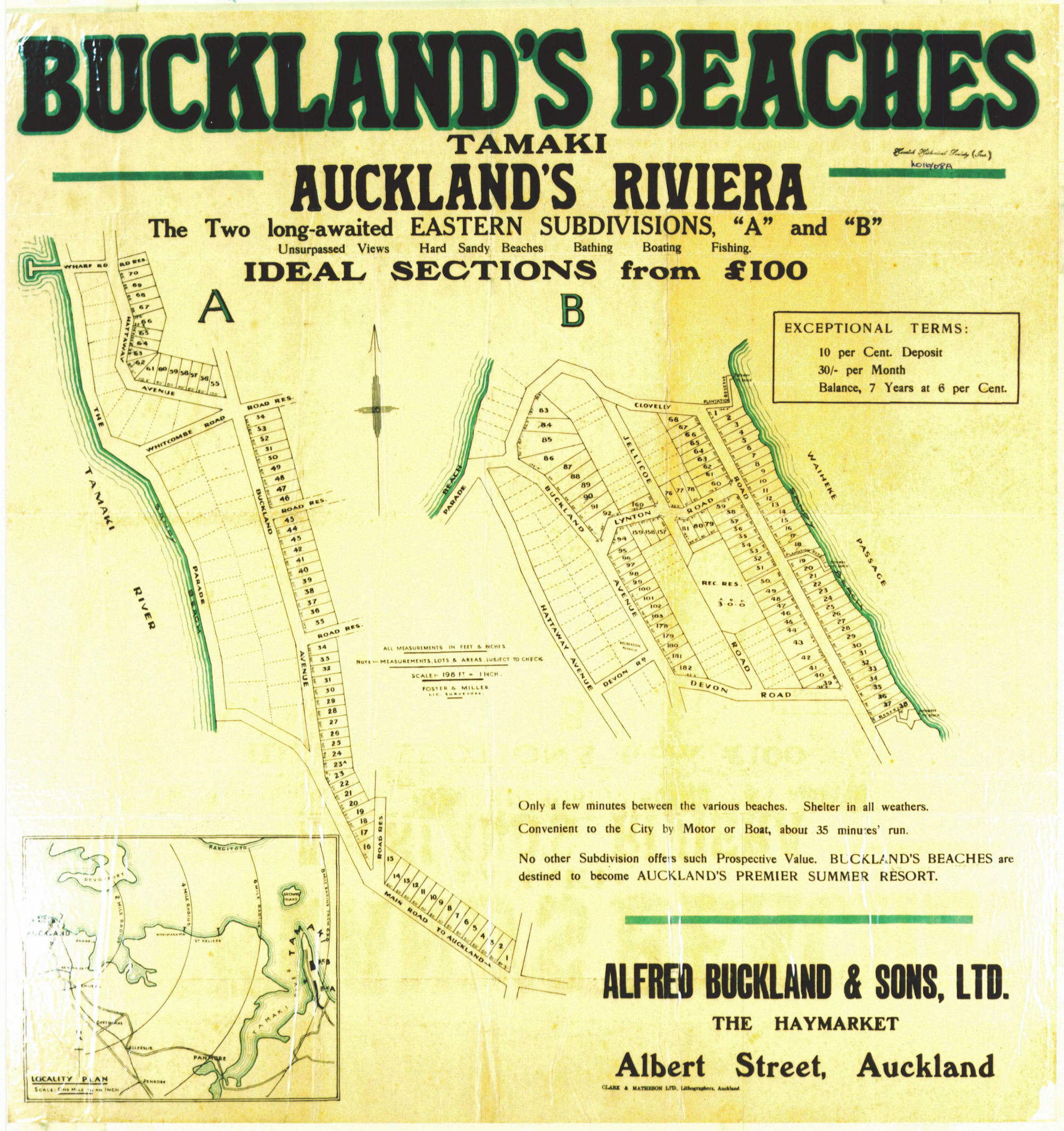
1923 poster advertising the "B" subdivision of Buckland's Beaches, which became Eastern Beach

Eastern Beach is part of the rohe of Ngāi Tai ki Tāmaki, who descend from the crew of the Tainui migratory waka, who visited the area around the year 1300. Early ancestor Tāiki settled with his followers along the eastern shores of the Tāmaki River, alongside the descendants of Huiārangi of the early iwi Te Tini ō Maruiwi. The traditional name for Eastern Beach is Okokino, and the headland south of the beach was known by the name Ngataieura. Eastern Beach, along with the surrounding area, was the location of Ngāi Tai agricultural cultivations.

In approximately the first half of the 18th century, Ngāriki, a rangatira of Ngāi Tai, built a fortified pā at Te Naupata (Musick Point), the headland at the end of the peninsula, called Te Waiārohia (a shortening of Te Waiārohia ō Ngāriki). The name refers to the panoramic views the pā commanded of the area. Ngāriki and the people of Te Waiārohia often came into conflict with Ngaromania, a rangatira who settled at Te Pupū ō Kawau on the western shores of the Tāmaki River who demanded heavy tolls to those who passed by. From the 1790s, Te Rangitāwhia was the paramount chief of Ngāi Tai, whose principal residences were at Waiārohia and to the south at Ōhuiarangi / Pigeon Mountain.

During the Musket Wars in the 1820s, Te Waiārohia and the Eastern Beach area were evacuated, and the lands became tapu to Ngāi Tai due to the events of the conflict. Most members of Ngāi Tai fled to the Waikato for temporary refuge during this time, and when English missionary William Thomas Fairburn visited the area in 1833, it was mostly unoccupied.

In 1836, William Thomas Fairburn brokered a land sale between Tāmaki Māori chiefs covering the majority of modern-day South Auckland, East Auckland and the Pōhutukawa Coast. The sale was envisioned as a way to end hostilities in the area, but it is unclear what the chiefs understood or consented to. Māori continued to live in the area, unchanged by this sale. In 1854 when Fairburn's purchase was investigated by the New Zealand Land Commission, a Ngāi Tai reserve was created around the Wairoa River and Umupuia areas, and as a part of the agreement, members of Ngāi Tai agreed to leave their traditional settlements to the west.

In 1847, Howick was established as a defensive outpost for Auckland, by fencibles (retired British Army soldiers) and their families. In 1851, William Mason bought a 320 acre plot from Fairburn at the modern-day site of Bucklands Beach, where he established a farm, growing oats, wheat and tending goats. Mason built a two-stored homestead above the beach, which was demolished in the 1950s. The area became known as Mason's Beach, a name used up until the late 1940s. In 1861, Mason sold his farm to Alfred Buckland, one of the largest agriculturalists in Auckland. The Bucklands family used to spend holidays at the beach, and in 1865 constructed a wharf for cattle and sheep. From 1880 until 1922, John Granger operated a lime factory at Eastern Beach, where local shells were crushed and burned.

Eastern Beach and Bucklands Beach became a popular holiday destination from the 1910s. The Buckland farm was first subdivided in 1916 when Bucklands Beach was established, and the Devonport Steamship Company constructed a second wharf at Bucklands Beach for passenger services. During this time, phoenix palms were planted at Eastern Beach, to give the area a tropical appearance. In 1923, Eastern Beach was subdivided and established as a housing estate, and in 1934 became a regularly used site for the Auckland Caravaning Club.

During World War II, concrete pillboxes were built at each end of Eastern Beach on the clifftops by local residents. After the establishment of Howick as a borough in 1952, the area rapidly developed suburban housing.

== Facilities ==
- Eastern Beach, which has a boat ramp.
- Macleans Park, a large urban park and nature reserve.
- Willow Park Christian Camp is a large camping facility located at Eastern Beach.

== Demographics ==
Eastern Beach covers 1.18 km^{2} (0.46 sq mi) and had an estimated population of 2,340 as of June 2025, with a population density of 1,983 people per km^{2}.

Historical population
Year	Pop.	±% p.a.
2006	2,181	—
2013	2,136	−0.30%
2018	2,190	+0.50%
2023	2,163	−0.25%

Eastern Beach had a population of 2,163 in the 2023 New Zealand census, a decrease of 27 people (−1.2%) since the 2018 census, and an increase of 27 people (1.3%) since the 2013 census. There were 1,074 males, 1,086 females and 6 people of other genders in 774 dwellings. 3.6% of people identified as LGBTIQ+. The median age was 43.8 years (compared with 38.1 years nationally). There were 369 people (17.1%) aged under 15 years, 378 (17.5%) aged 15 to 29, 1,014 (46.9%) aged 30 to 64, and 405 (18.7%) aged 65 or older.

People could identify as more than one ethnicity. The results were 49.5% European (Pākehā); 4.4% Māori; 3.2% Pasifika; 47.3% Asian; 1.5% Middle Eastern, Latin American and African New Zealanders (MELAA); and 1.7% other, which includes people giving their ethnicity as "New Zealander". English was spoken by 91.4%, Māori language by 0.7%, Samoan by 0.3%, and other languages by 43.6%. No language could be spoken by 1.2% (e.g. too young to talk). New Zealand Sign Language was known by 0.4%. The percentage of people born overseas was 54.5, compared with 28.8% nationally.

Religious affiliations were 30.2% Christian, 2.9% Hindu, 1.5% Islam, 0.1% Māori religious beliefs, 2.8% Buddhist, 0.3% New Age, 0.4% Jewish, and 3.1% other religions. People who answered that they had no religion were 53.4%, and 5.5% of people did not answer the census question.

Of those at least 15 years old, 678 (37.8%) people had a bachelor's or higher degree, 732 (40.8%) had a post-high school certificate or diploma, and 384 (21.4%) people exclusively held high school qualifications. The median income was $41,300, compared with $41,500 nationally. 312 people (17.4%) earned over $100,000 compared to 12.1% nationally. The employment status of those at least 15 was that 807 (45.0%) people were employed full-time, 240 (13.4%) were part-time, and 42 (2.3%) were unemployed.

== Bibliography ==
- La Roche, Alan (2011). Grey's Folly: A History of Howick, Pakuranga, Bucklands-Eastern Beaches, East Tamaki, Whitford, Beachlands and Maraetai. Auckland: Tui Vale Productions. ISBN 978-0-473-18547-3. OCLC 1135039710. Wikidata Q118286377.
