= Panmure Basin =

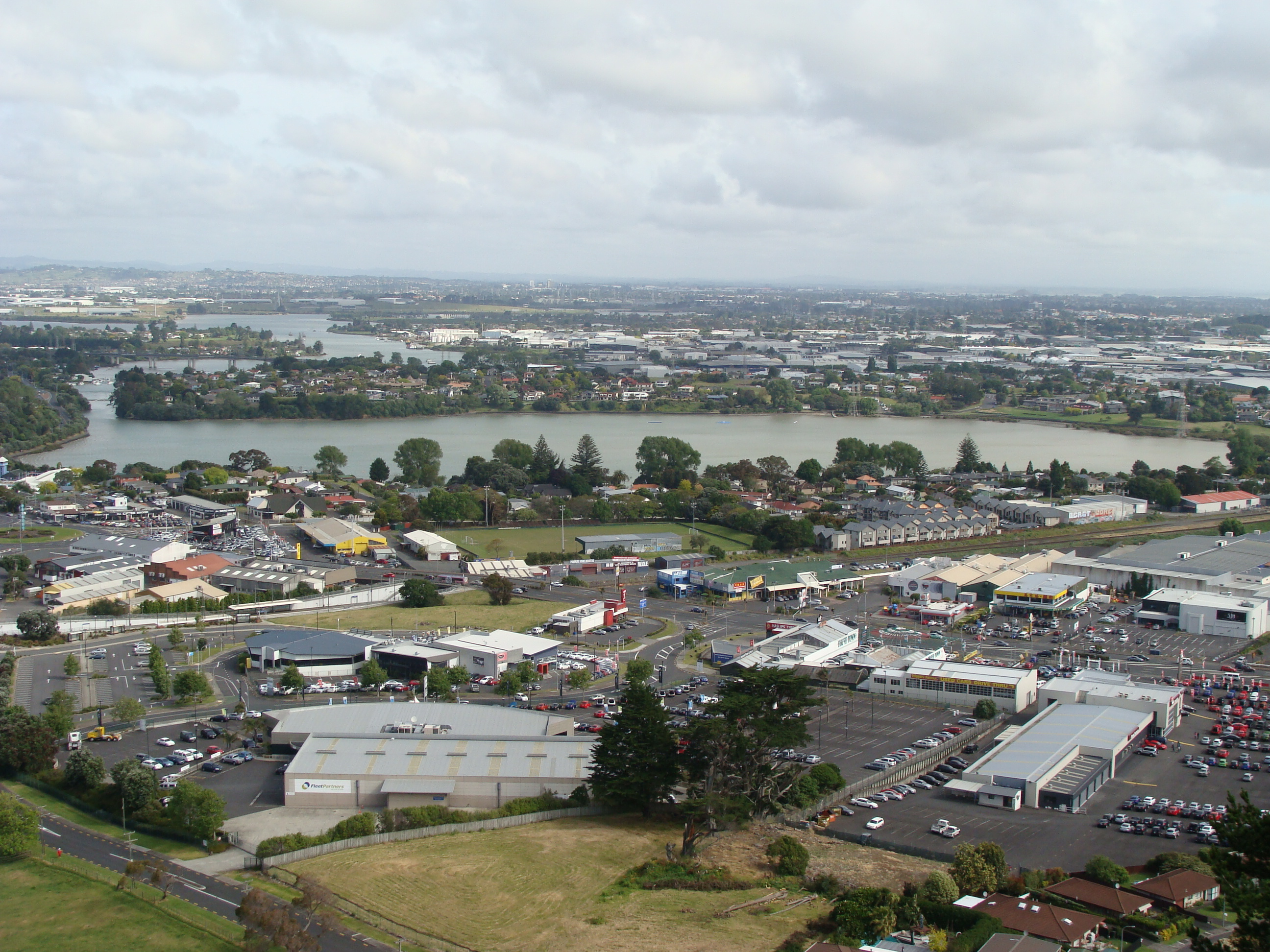
- View of Panmure Basin from Maungarei / Mount Wellington
- Interactive map of Panmure Basin
- Location: Auckland, North Island
- Coordinates: 36.9049°S 174.8493°E
- Type: maar lake
- Primary outflows: Tamaki River
- Surface elevation: 0 m (0 ft)

The Panmure Basin (traditionally known in Māori as Kaiahiku or Te Kopua Kai-a-Hiku), also sometimes known as the Panmure Lagoon, is a tidal estuary within a volcanic crater or maar in New Zealand's Auckland volcanic field. It is located to the south of Panmure town centre.

== Geology ==
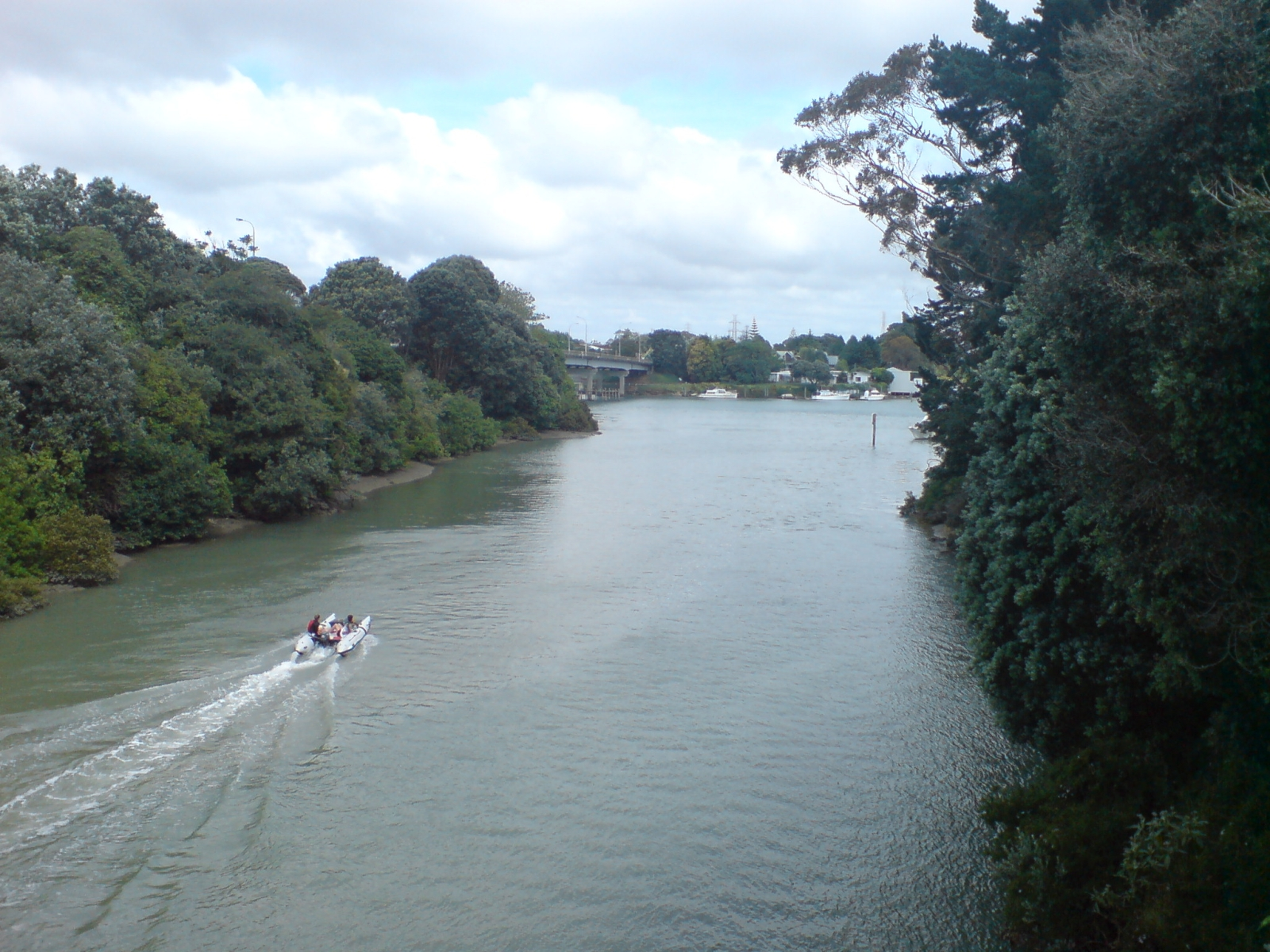
The narrow passage that connects Panmure Basin to the Tāmaki River

The volcano erupted approximately 25,200 years ago. During the Last Glacial Maximum, the basin was a freshwater lake. When sea-levels rose, the estuarine waters of the Tāmaki River breached the lake, turning it into a tidal estuary. A small scoria cone is found in the centre of the basin, obscured by layers of mud.

== History ==
The traditional name of the basin was Te Kai a Hiku. It features in traditional Tāmaki Māori stories as the eating place of the taniwha Moko-ika-hiku-waru. The headland between the basin and the Tāmaki River was the location of the Ngāti Pāoa pā Mauināina (also known as Maunga-inaina and Taumata-inaina).

In February 2008, scientists announced that drilling had discovered a scoria cone buried within the mud filling the explosion crater. Although newspaper journalists inferred that the discovered scoria cone was a much younger and different volcano from Panmure Basin, geologists consider that the scoria cone was produced as the second phase of the eruption of Panmure Basin explosion crater and tuff ring. The explosive phase was produced by the interaction of the magma with cold groundwater but once the water was used up the eruption switched to a dry phase of fire-fountaining producing the scoria cone from the same vent. Thus Panmure Basin is no different from a number of other volcanoes in the Auckland volcanic field, such as the Auckland Domain Volcano, Māngere Lagoon Volcano, Waitomokia, Te Tatua-a-Riukiuta and Crater Hill (each with one or more scoria cones inside their explosion crater), except that Panmure Basin's small central scoria cone was buried.

== See also ==
- Volcanoes of Auckland: The Essential guide - Hayward, B.W., Murdoch, G., Maitland, G.; Auckland University Press, 2011.
- Volcanoes of Auckland: A Field Guide. Hayward, B.W.; Auckland University Press, 2019, 335 pp. ISBN 0-582-71784-1.
