= Bucklands Beach =

- Suburb
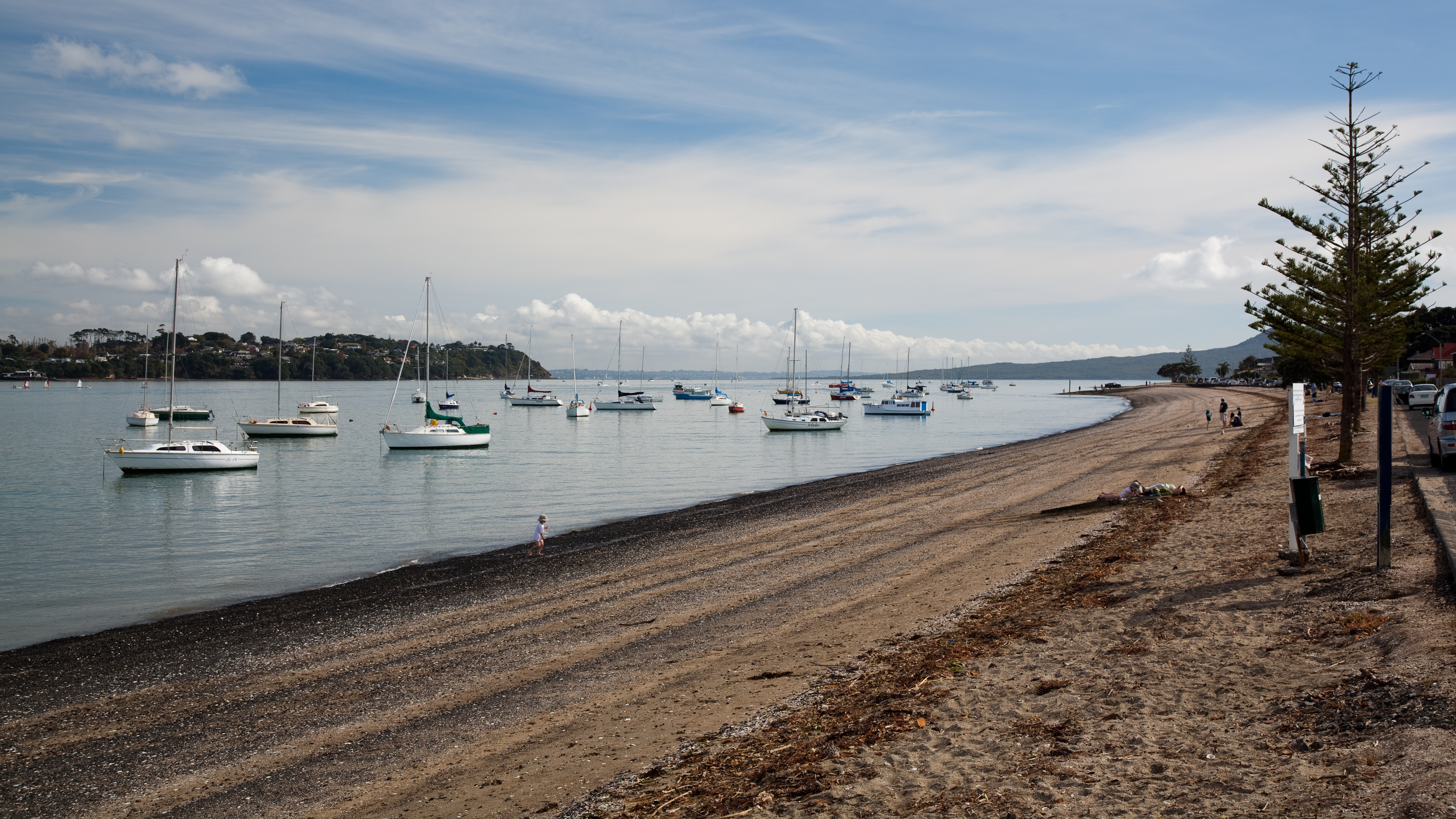
- Bucklands Beach
- Interactive map of Bucklands Beach
- Coordinates: 36.868932°S 174.906159°E
- Country: New Zealand
- City: Auckland
- Local authority: Auckland Council
- Electoral ward: Howick ward
- Local board: Howick Local Board

Area
  - Land: 308 ha (760 acres)

Population (June 2025)
  - Total: 10,480
  - Density: 3,400/km^{2} (8,810/sq mi)

(Tāmaki River)	Musick Point	Hauraki Gulf
(Tāmaki River)	Bucklands Beach	Eastern Beach
Half Moon Bay	Highland Park, Howick	Eastern Beach

Bucklands Beach is a suburb and beach 13 kilometres (8.1 mi) east of Auckland's CBD in New Zealand. Bucklands Beach was originally a rural farm owned by Alfred Buckland until being developed as a holiday destination for Aucklanders in the 1910s with a regular passenger service to the beach. In the 1950s Bucklands Beach developed as a suburban area following Howick's status as a borough council.

== Etymology ==
Bucklands Beach derives its name from Alfred Buckland. Buckland was known to holiday at the beach.

== Geography ==
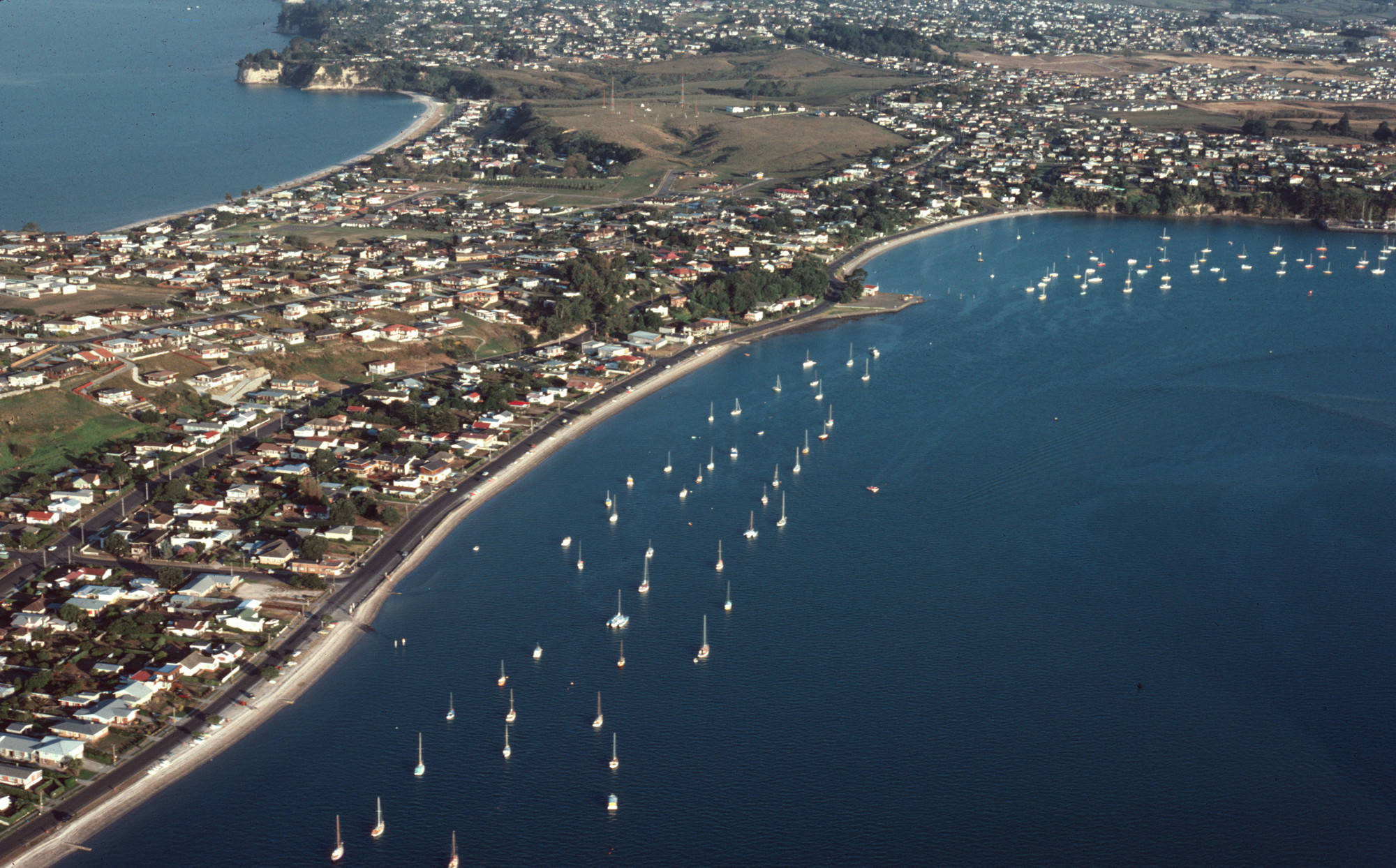
Aerial view of Bucklands Beach in 1976

Bucklands Beach is located on the western side of a peninsula between the Tāmaki River and the Tāmaki Strait of the Hauraki Gulf. At the peninsula's northernmost point, Musick Point / Te Naupata juts into the gulf. The beach itself is located on the western side of the peninsula, which looks out towards Tahuna Torea, a sandspit on the western banks of the Tāmaki River.

== History ==
=== Māori history ===
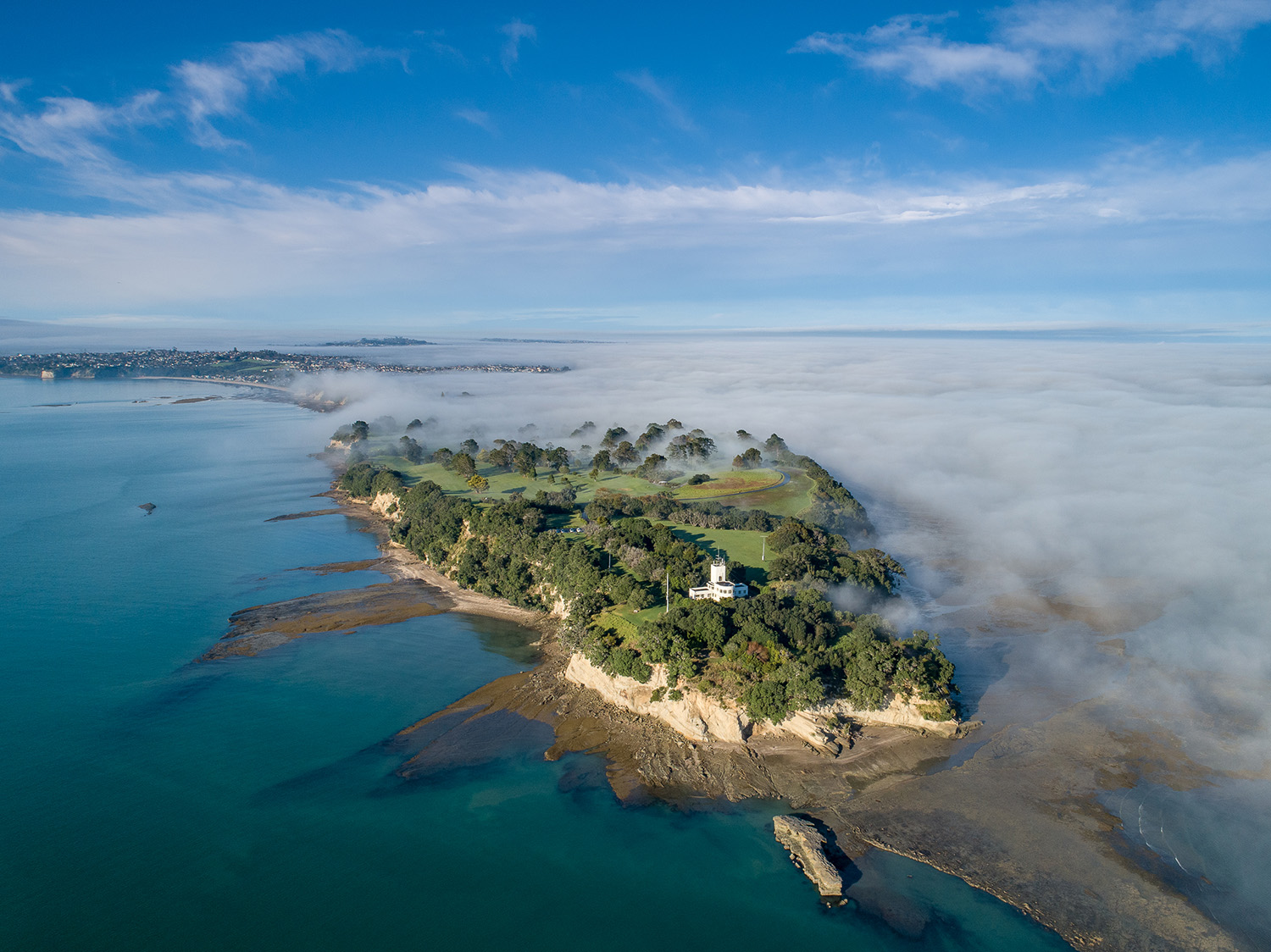
Musick Point / Te Naupata was the location of Te Waiārohia, a major defensive pā in the 18th century

The Bucklands Beach area is part of the rohe of Ngāi Tai ki Tāmaki, who descend from the crew of the Tainui migratory waka, who visited the area around the year 1300. The mouth of the Tāmaki River was traditionally known as Te Wai ō Tāiki ("The Waters of Tāiki"), named after the Ngāi Tai ancestor Tāiki. Tāiki settled with his followers along the eastern shores of the Tāmaki River, alongside the descendants of Huiārangi of the early iwi Te Tini ō Maruiwi. The traditional name for Bucklands Beach is Te Kōmiti, and the area was strategically important as it was close to both the Tāmaki Strait and the route towards Te Tō Waka, the portage at Ōtāhuhu where waka could easily cross into the Manukau Harbour. Te Kōmiti was a site where Tāmaki Māori constructed stone adzes, using greywacke boulders from Motutapu Island. The wider area was rich in food resources, and the eastern coast of the Tāmaki River was widely cultivated.

In approximately the first half of the 18th century, Ngāriki, a rangatira of Ngāi Tai, built a fortified pā at Te Naupata (Musick Point), the headland at the end of the peninsula, called Te Waiārohia (a shortening of Te Waiārohia ō Ngāriki). The name refers to the panoramic views the pā commanded of the area. Ngāriki and the people of Te Waiārohia often came into conflict with Ngaromania, a rangarita who settled at Te Pupū ō Kawau on the western shores of the Tāmaki River who demanded heavy tolls to those who passed by. From the 1790s, Te Rangitāwhia was the paramount chief of Ngāi Tai, whose principal residences were at Waiārohia and to the south at Ōhuiarangi / Pigeon Mountain.

During the Musket Wars in the 1820s, Te Waiārohia and the Bucklands Beach area were evacuated, and the lands became tapu to Ngāi Tai due to the events of the conflict. Most members of Ngāi Tai fled to the Waikato for temporary refuge during this time, and when English missionary William Thomas Fairburn visited the area in 1833, it was mostly unoccupied.

In 1836, William Thomas Fairburn brokered a land sale between Tāmaki Māori chiefs covering the majority of modern-day South Auckland, East Auckland and the Pōhutukawa Coast. The sale was envisioned as a way to end hostilities in the area, but it is unclear what the chiefs understood or consented to. Māori continued to live in the area, unchanged by this sale. In 1854 when Fairburn's purchase was investigated by the New Zealand Land Commission, a Ngāi Tai reserve was created around the Wairoa River and Umupuia areas, and as a part of the agreement, members of Ngāi Tai agreed to leave their traditional settlements to the west.

=== European settlement ===
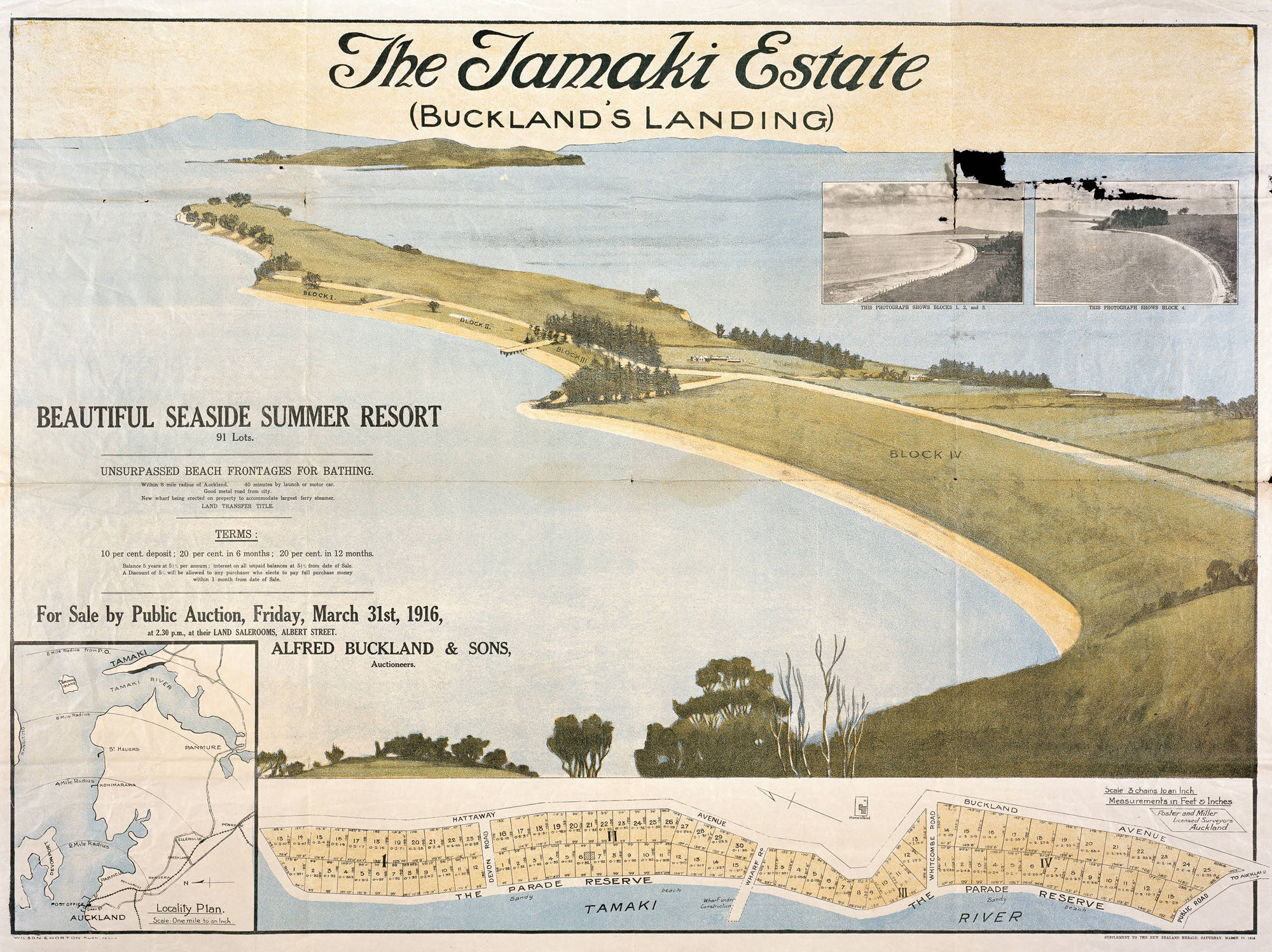
1916 advertisement for the sale of The Tamaki Estate (Buckland's Landing)

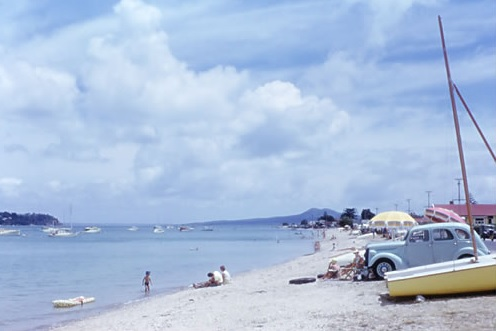
Bucklands Beach in the summer of 1961

At the time, the area was known as the Tamaki Landing, and it was one of the major transport routes for the isolated fencible settlement was the ferry, which connected Bucklands Beach to Panmure and Point England several times per week. In 1861, Mason sold his farm to Alfred Buckland, one of the largest agriculturalists in Auckland. The Bucklands family used to spend holidays at the beach, and in 1865 constructed a wharf for cattle and sheep. From the 1860s until 1879, Little Bucklands Beach to the south became the site of John Granger's brickworks.

In the 1910s, Bucklands Beach became a popular holidaying destination for Aucklanders. The Buckland farm was subdivided into the Tamaki Estate in 1916, and the Devonport Steamship Company constructed a second wharf at Bucklands Beach for passenger services to reach the beach and new settlement. The first post office for Bucklands Beach opened in 1921, and in 1923 the neighbouring suburb Eastern Beach was subdivided.

During World War II, the Bucklands Beach Home Guard was established, who met weekly for military training exercises at Ōhuiarangi / Pigeon Mountain. In 1942, an air traffic communication centre was established at Musick Point. The centre facilitated most of the long range radio transmissions for Auckland, communicating with ships and aircraft, and was used by American naval forces. In May 1949 the Manukau County Council changed the suburb's name from Buckland's Beach to Bucklands Beach.

The area remained primarily a holidaying destination until the 1950s. After the establishment of Howick as a borough in 1952, the Howick and Bucklands Beach areas rapidly developed. In 1954, the Cockle Bay golf course was moved to Musick Point, and in 1956, the Buckland and Easter Beaches War Memorial Community Centre was opened.

== Demographics ==
Bucklands Beach covers 3.08 km^{2} (1.19 sq mi) and had an estimated population of 10,480 as of June 2025, with a population density of 3,403 people per km^{2}.

Historical population
Year	Pop.	±% p.a.
2006	8,598	—
2013	8,817	+0.36%
2018	9,045	+0.51%
2023	9,540	+1.07%

Bucklands Beach had a population of 9,540 in the 2023 New Zealand census, an increase of 495 people (5.5%) since the 2018 census, and an increase of 723 people (8.2%) since the 2013 census. There were 4,719 males, 4,803 females and 21 people of other genders in 3,075 dwellings. 2.3% of people identified as LGBTIQ+. The median age was 40.8 years (compared with 38.1 years nationally). There were 1,980 people (20.8%) aged under 15 years, 1,626 (17.0%) aged 15 to 29, 4,464 (46.8%) aged 30 to 64, and 1,470 (15.4%) aged 65 or older.

People could identify as more than one ethnicity. The results were 41.8% European (Pākehā); 3.0% Māori; 2.6% Pasifika; 55.3% Asian; 2.3% Middle Eastern, Latin American and African New Zealanders (MELAA); and 1.8% other, which includes people giving their ethnicity as "New Zealander". English was spoken by 88.2%, Māori language by 0.7%, Samoan by 0.4%, and other languages by 48.5%. No language could be spoken by 1.5% (e.g. too young to talk). New Zealand Sign Language was known by 0.3%. The percentage of people born overseas was 58.9, compared with 28.8% nationally.

Religious affiliations were 29.3% Christian, 2.8% Hindu, 2.1% Islam, 0.2% Māori religious beliefs, 3.5% Buddhist, 0.2% New Age, 0.1% Jewish, and 3.2% other religions. People who answered that they had no religion were 52.9%, and 5.8% of people did not answer the census question.

Of those at least 15 years old, 2,727 (36.1%) people had a bachelor's or higher degree, 2,940 (38.9%) had a post-high school certificate or diploma, and 1,896 (25.1%) people exclusively held high school qualifications. The median income was $44,100, compared with $41,500 nationally. 1,158 people (15.3%) earned over $100,000 compared to 12.1% nationally. The employment status of those at least 15 was that 3,834 (50.7%) people were employed full-time, 963 (12.7%) were part-time, and 198 (2.6%) were unemployed.

Individual statistical areas
Name	Area (km^{2})	Population	Density (per km^{2})	Dwellings	Median age	Median income
Bucklands Beach North	1.38	3,105	2,250	1,080	43.5 years	$49,500
Bucklands Beach Central	0.58	1,977	3,409	651	41.7 years	$42,800
Bucklands Beach Murvale	0.64	2,712	4,238	783	38.8 years	$40,100
Bucklands Beach South	0.48	1,746	3,638	558	36.4 years	$43,200
New Zealand					38.1 years	$41,500

== Facilities and amenities ==
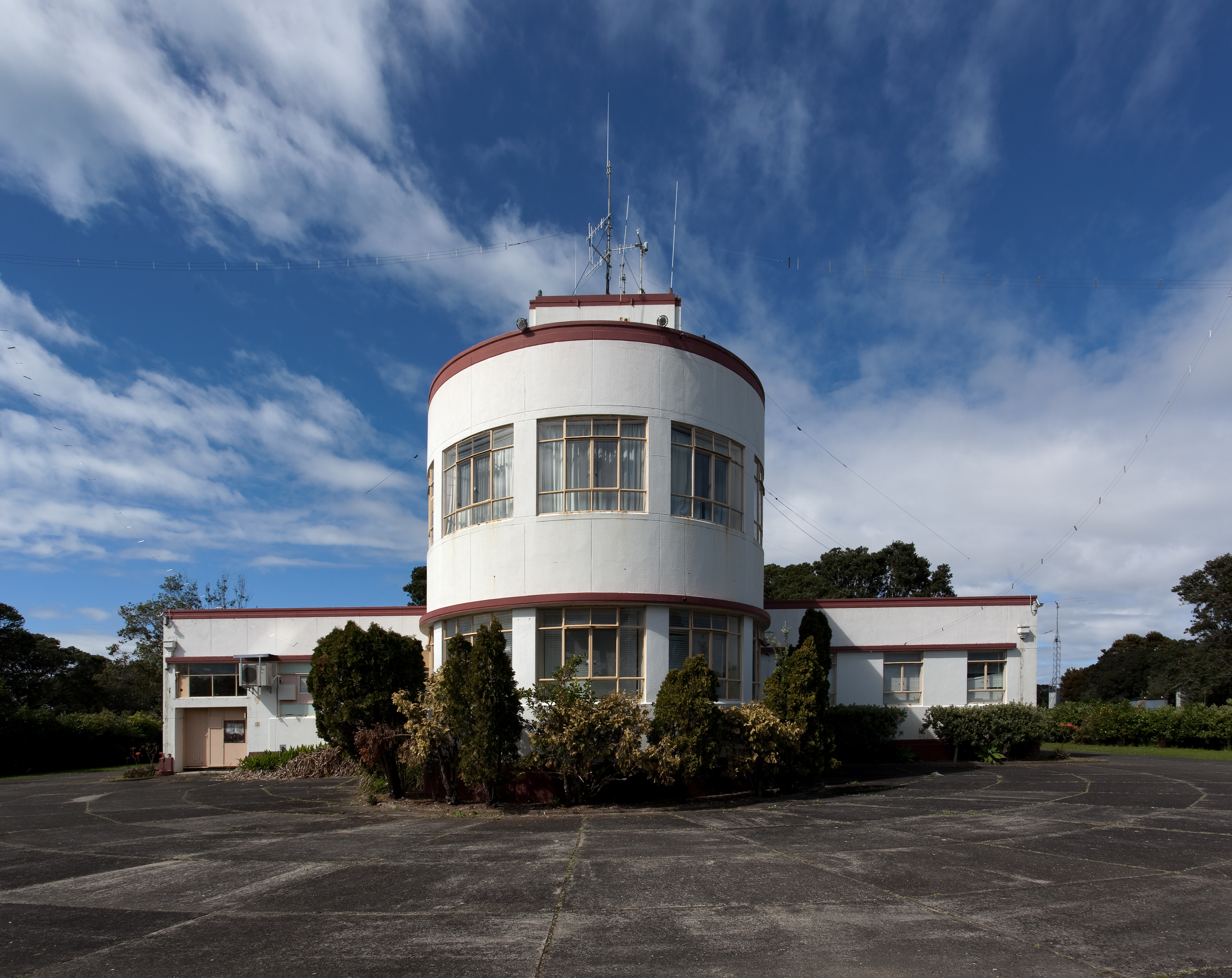
Musick Memorial Radio Station

- Musick Point / Te Naupata, home to the Musick Memorial Radio Station and Howick Golf Club
- The old Bucklands Beach Boating and Life Saving Club clubrooms and boatramp, constructed in 1968 at Grangers Point, between Big and Little Bucklands Beach. The yacht club moved to Half Moon Bay in 1982.
- Warren Boardwalk, a walkway connecting Half Moon Bay and Little Bucklands Beach that was constructed in 2011. The boardwalk is a part of the wider Bucklands Beach Path, which spans much of the peninsula.
- Rogers Park, a public park with football and American football pitches. The Bucklands Beach Association Football Club constructed clubrooms at the park in 1984.
- Bucklands Beach Bowling Club, which was established in 1929.
- The Reformed Presbyterian Church of Bucklands Beach, which opened in 1955.

== Education ==
Bucklands Beach Primary School was the first school established in the area, in 1955. Bucklands Beach Primary School, Macleans Primary School, and Pigeon Mountain School are contributing primary schools (years 1–6) with rolls of 396, 532 and 478 students, respectively.

Bucklands Beach Intermediate School opened in 1976, and is an intermediate school (years 7–8) with a roll of 890. Macleans College is a secondary school (years 9–13) with a roll of 2940 students, that was established in 1980. All these schools are coeducational. Rolls are as of July 2025.

In 1980, Waimokoia School, a school for children with social and behavioural difficulties, was opened in Bucklands Beach, replacing the former Mt Wellington Residential School. The school was closed in 2010 after allegations of mistreatment of students.

== Bibliography ==
- Alexander, Ruth; Gibson, Gail; la Roche, Alan (1997). The Royal New Zealand Fencibles, 1847–1852. New Zealand Fencible Society. ISBN 0473047160.
- La Roche, Alan (2011). Grey's Folly: A History of Howick, Pakuranga, Bucklands-Eastern Beaches, East Tamaki, Whitford, Beachlands and Maraetai. Auckland: Tui Vale Productions. ISBN 978-0-473-18547-3. OCLC 1135039710. Wikidata Q118286377.
- Thomas, Rhys (2011). "Musick Point Radio Station". In La Roche, John (ed.). Evolving Auckland: The City's Engineering Heritage. Wily Publications. ISBN 9781927167038.
