= Tāmaki Strait =

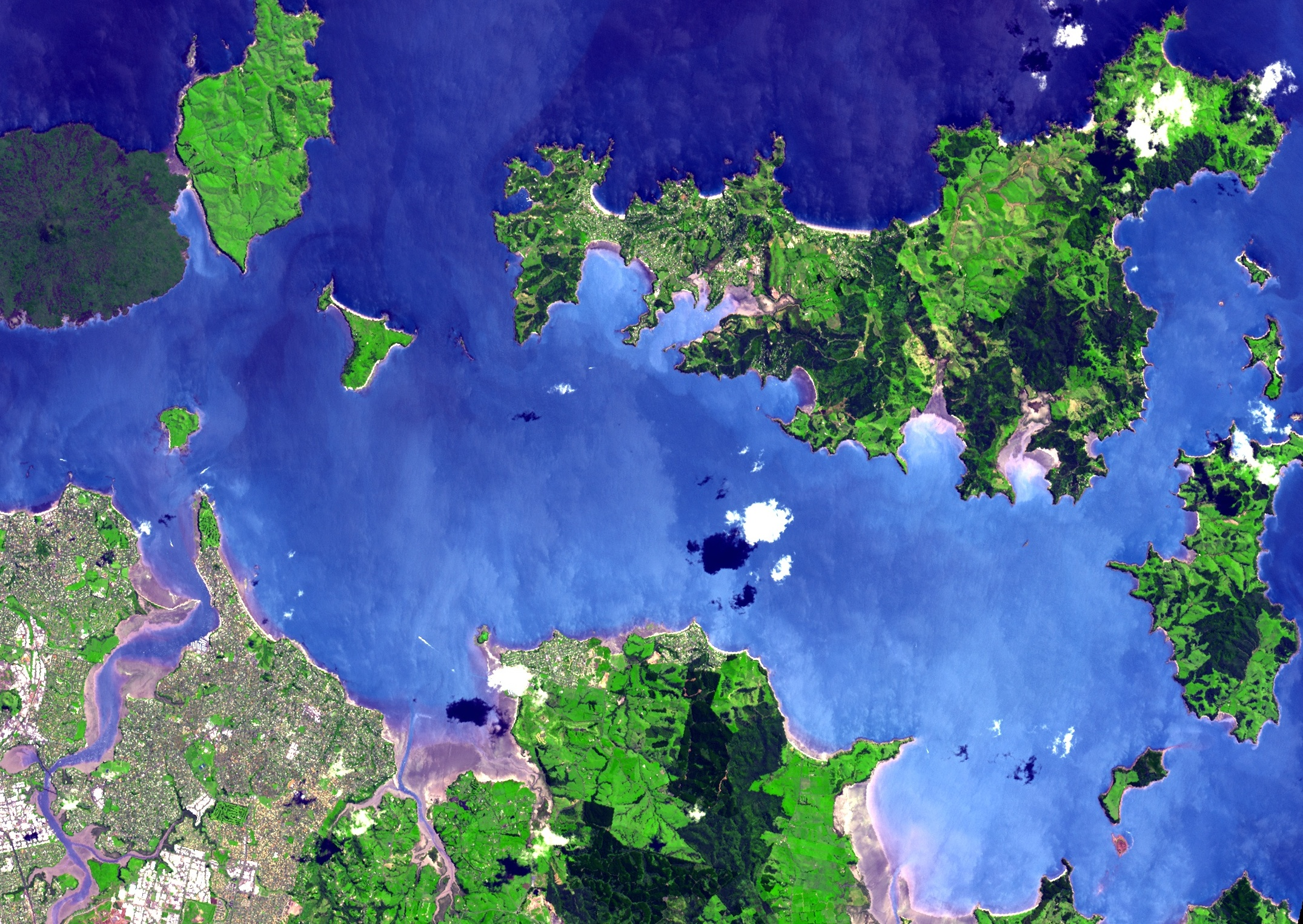
- Satellite view of the Tāmaki Strait

- Location within the Auckland Region
- Location: Auckland Region, New Zealand
- Coordinates: 36.85°S 175.03°E
- River sources: Mangemangeroa Creek, Tāmaki River, Turanga Creek, Waikopua Creek, Wairoa River
- Ocean/sea sources: Hauraki Gulf, Pacific Ocean
- Islands: Karamuramu Island, Koi Island, Motuihe Island, Motukaraka Island, Motukorea, Motutapu Island, Rangitoto Island, Pakihi Island, Papakohatu Island (Crusoe Island), Ponui Island
- Settlements: Beachlands, Blackpool, Bucklands Beach, Eastern Beach, Glendowie, Howick, Maraetai, Mellons Bay, Ōmiha, Orapiu, Ostend, Saint Heliers, Shelly Park, Surfdale

The Tāmaki Strait is an area of the Hauraki Gulf in the Auckland Region of New Zealand's North Island. The strait is east of the Waitematā Harbour, and is located between Waiheke Island, East Auckland and the Pōhutukawa Coast. The area is sometimes referred to as The Back Paddock by sailors.

== Geography ==
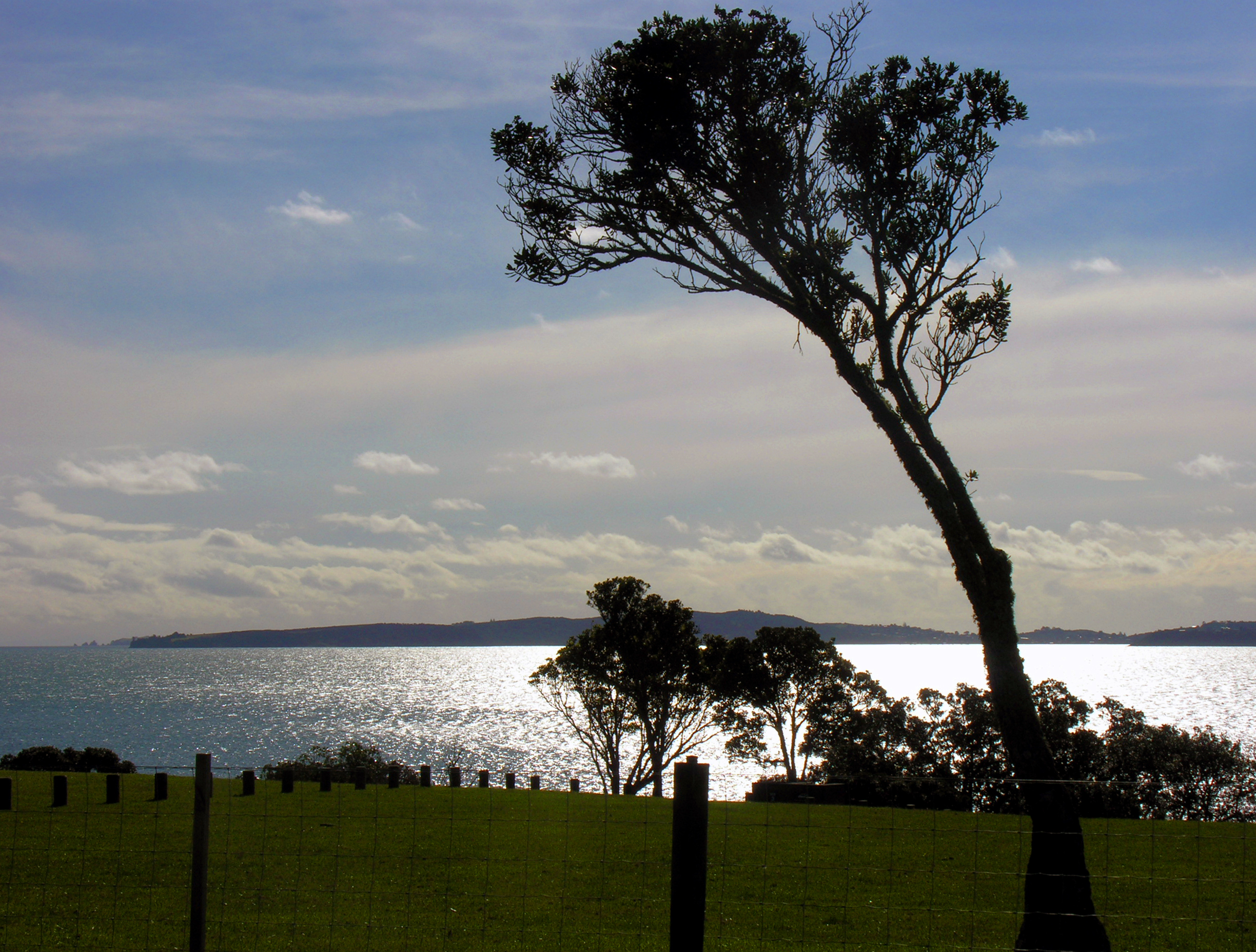
The Tamaki Strait and Waiheke Island, seen from Beachlands

The Tāmaki Strait is located to the east of Auckland, south of Waiheke Island and north of the Pōhutukawa Coast. During the Last Glacial Maximum (known locally as the Ōtira Glaciation), the area was primarily a flat river valley, until between 12,000 and 7,000 years ago when sea levels rose. The westernmost points of the strait are Rangitoto Island and Achilles Point, and the easternmost are Ponui Island and Raukura Point. Within the strait is Te Matuku Marine Reserve, on the south-eastern coast of Waiheke Island.

The strait is shallow, with the majority of the area being within 10 metres under sea-level.

== History ==
The Tāmaki Strait was one of the locations visited by the Tainui migratory waka, as the crew explored the eastern bays of the Auckland Region. The area was explored by Ngāi Tai ki Tāmaki ancestor Peretū. The strait's traditional name is Te Maraetai, meaning "Marae Enclosed by the Tides", referring to how the sheltered ocean of the strait acted like a flat marae ātea (marae entrance courtyard). An alternative name that was used was Te Awaroa ("The Long Channel").

== Bibliography ==
- Green, Nathew (2011). "From Hawaīki to Howick – A Ngāi Tai History". Grey's Folly: A History of Howick, Pakuranga, Bucklands-Eastern Beaches, East Tamaki, Whitford, Beachlands and Maraetai. By La Roche, Alan. Auckland: Tui Vale Productions. pp. 16–33. ISBN 978-0-473-18547-3. OCLC 1135039710.
- La Roche, Alan (2011). Grey's Folly: A History of Howick, Pakuranga, Bucklands-Eastern Beaches, East Tamaki, Whitford, Beachlands and Maraetai. Auckland: Tui Vale Productions. ISBN 978-0-473-18547-3. OCLC 1135039710. Wikidata Q118286377.
