= Tāmaki River =

River in Auckland, New Zealand

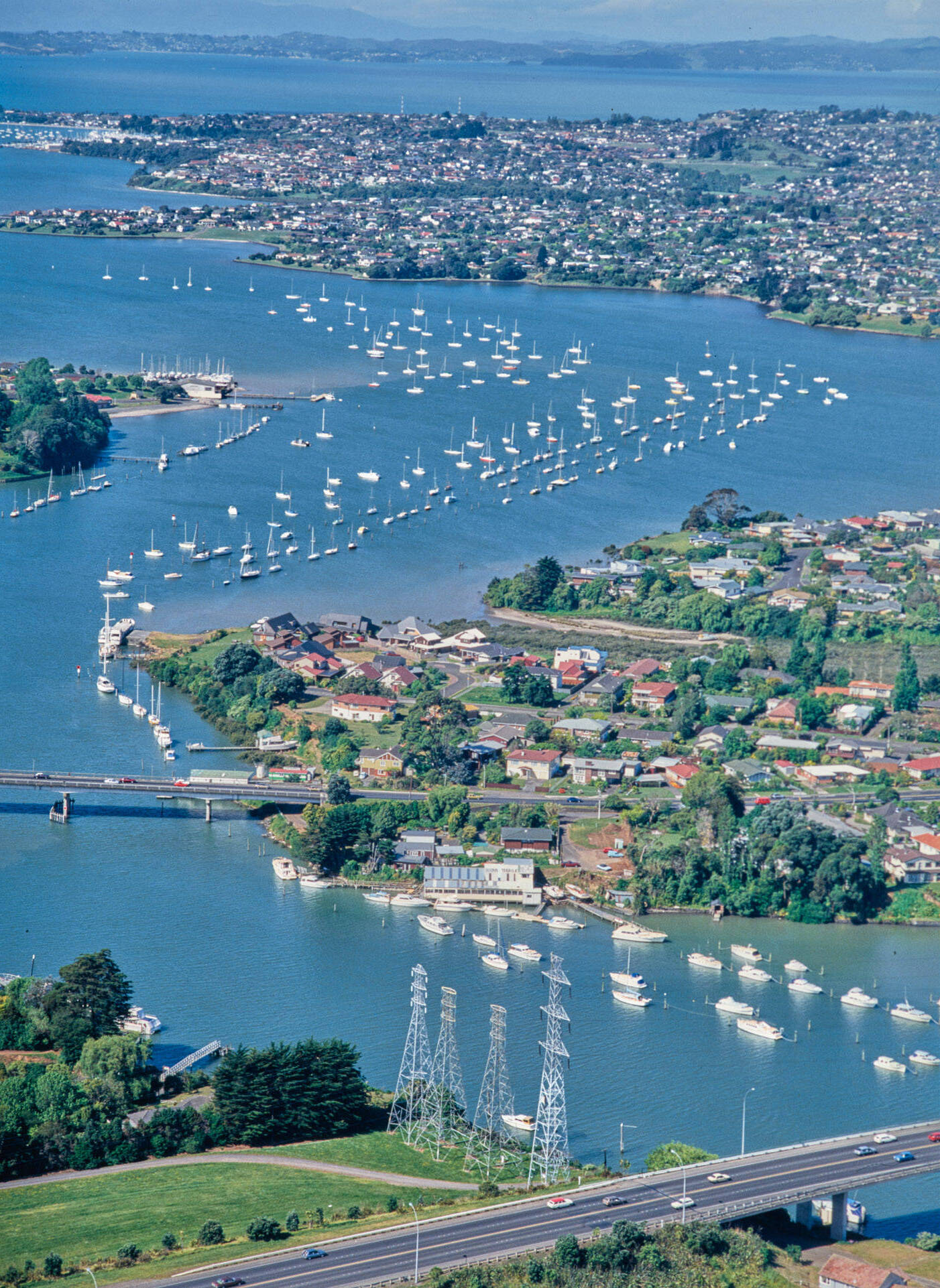
- Aerial view of the Tāmaki River in the 1980s or 1990s, the 4th Panmure Bridge, just east of the Panmure Bridge does not exist.

- Mouth of the Tāmaki River Tāmaki River (New Zealand)
- Route of the Tāmaki River
- Native name: Te Wai o Taiki

Location
- Country: New Zealand
- Region: Auckland Region

Physical characteristics
- Source: Middlemore
  - coordinates: 36.96484°S 174.84533°E
- Mouth: Tāmaki Strait
  - coordinates: 36.8465°S 174.8889°E
- Length: 15 km (9 mi)

Basin features
- Progression: Tāmaki River → Tāmaki Strait → Hauraki Gulf
- Tributaries
  - left: Ōmaru Creek, Ōtāhuhu Creek
  - right: Wakaaranga Creek, Pakuranga Creek, Ōtara Creek
- Bridges: Panmure Bridge, Waipuna Bridge, Auckland Southern Motorway Tamaki River Bridge, Tāmaki Bridge

The Tāmaki River or Tāmaki Estuary is a mostly estuarial arm and harbour of the Hauraki Gulf, within the city of Auckland, New Zealand. It extends south for 15 kilometres (9 mi) from its mouth between the suburb of Saint Heliers and the long thin peninsula of Bucklands Beach, which reaches its end at Musick Point. The inlet extends past the suburbs of Glendowie, Wai o Taiki Bay, Point England, Glen Innes, Tāmaki, Panmure, and Ōtāhuhu to the west, and Bucklands Beach, Half Moon Bay, Farm Cove, Sunnyhills and Pakuranga to the east.

== Etymology ==
It was originally called Te Wai o Taiki, meaning "The Waters of Taiki". The name Taiki is a shortened form of Taikehu, the name of an ancestor of Ngāi Tai.

== Geography ==
The estuarine Tāmaki River is a harbour in the Auckland Region, with four arms: the Ōtāhuhu Creek, Middlemore Creek, Pakuranga Creek and the Ōtara Creek. In addition to these, the Panmure Basin is a tidal basin found in a volcanic crater on the western shores of the river.

The Ōtāhuhu Creek forms the eastern shore of the narrowest point on the Auckland isthmus: here it is about 1.25 kilometres (0.75 mi) to the waters of the Manukau Harbour, an arm of the Tasman Sea.

== History ==
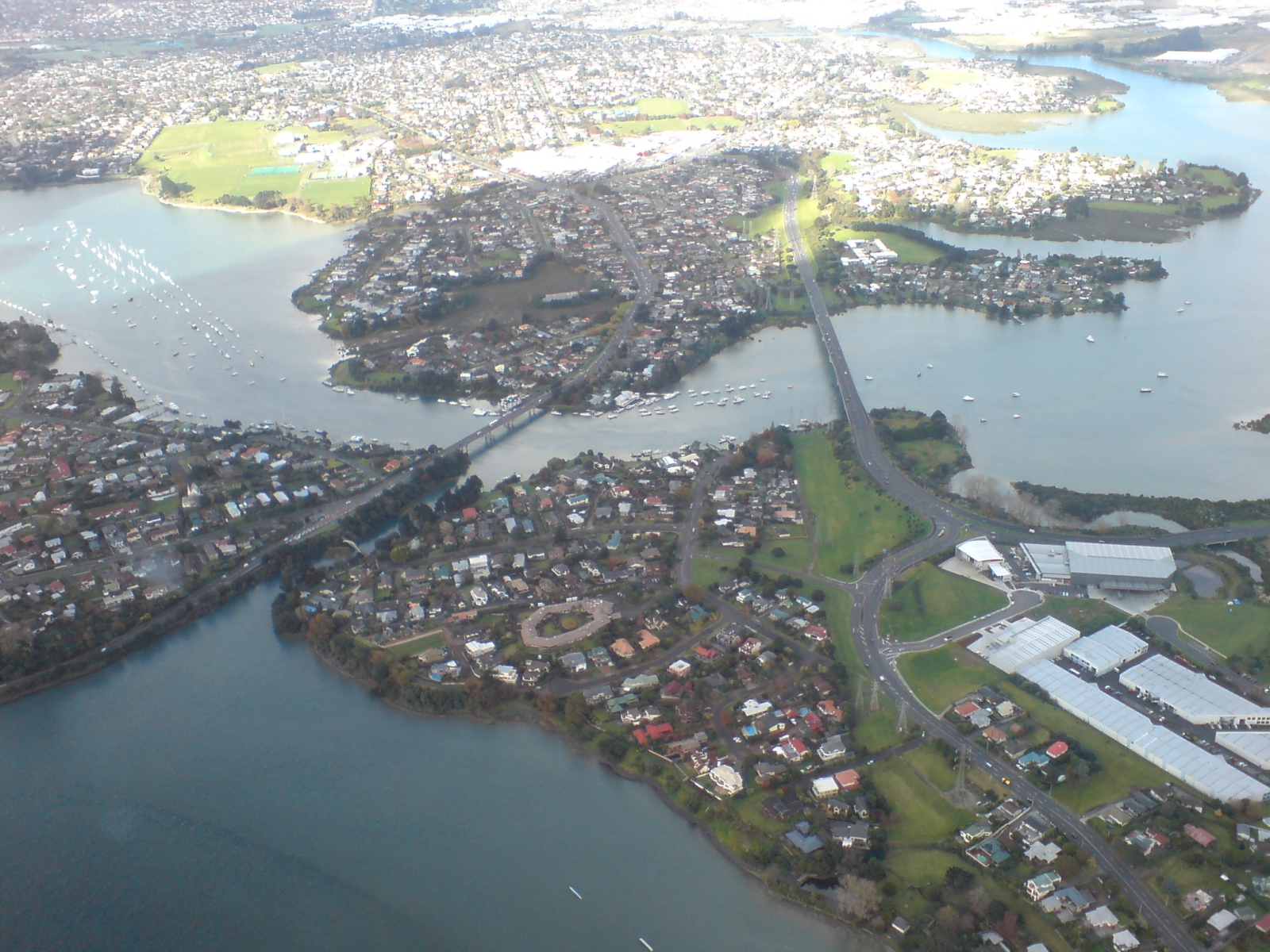
The middle of the estuary looking east

The Tāmaki River is the location of three portages which connected the east and west coasts of New Zealand: Te Tō Waka at Ōtāhuhu, the shortest portage between the two coasts, Karetu to the north at Southdown/Sylvia Park, and the Waokauri / Pūkaki portage, to the south between Middlemore and Papatoetoe. Here, Māori would beach their waka (canoes) and drag them overland to the other coast, thus avoiding having to paddle around North Cape. The portages made the area of immense strategic importance in both pre-European times and during the early years of European occupation. Portage Road, Ōtāhuhu is the approximate historical location of Te Tō Waka. Karetu and went between the extreme north-east corner of the Manukau Harbour to a bay close to the site of the newest bridge across the Tāmaki, about 1 kilometre (0.6 mi) south of the Panmure Basin.

The river was part of the first steam ferry route in Auckland, the PS Governor Wynyard connecting Auckland to Ōtāhuhu, which began service in 1851. By the next year, the ferry was sold to Melbourne as it was unprofitable. By the late 1850s, the Tāmaki River was one of the busiest waterways in New Zealand. The east bank at Pakuranga was the main point where cattle were transported towards the city of Auckland.

In 1865, the estuary was first crossed by the Panmure Bridge, a steel swing bridge, to improve connection between Auckland and Howick. The location is 20 metres (66 ft) to the left of the left hand (Panmure) bridge shown in the photo. The circular base swivel was only removed in the 1980s from the southern shore. Stones and steel had been imported from Australia, possibly reflecting the still very basic nature of industrial construction in the young colony.

In the 1860s and 70s, the Tāmaki River was one of the busiest waterways in New Zealand, due to the transportation of agricultural goods such as wheat between Ōtāhuhu and the city of Auckland. The popularity of alternative transportation such as roads and rail (including the extension of the Southern Line to Ōtāhuhu in 1875) led to a decline of the use of the Tāmaki River, and by 1910 very few vessels used Ōtāhuhu as a port or even ventured upstream of the Panmure Bridge. In the 1890s the mouth of the river was used as a safe anchorage for ships carrying explosives. One such ship, anchored in the mouth of the estuary, caught fire and exploded with loss of life. After this the explosives buoy was moved into a more open area east of Browns Island (Motukōrea), where it is still located.

In 1925 a 1.9-metre (6 ft 2 in) leopard that had escaped from the Auckland Zoo three weeks earlier was found dead in the Tāmaki river by a fishing party in Karaka Bay.

== Transport ==
Due to its extent north–south and its position between the Auckland isthmus and East Auckland, the river is a natural barrier to traffic, especially as only three bridges cross it, all heavily trafficked and increasingly incapable of taking the peak hour flows. The Eastern Busway is a project that is designed to resolve this bottle-neck as one of its goals.

The Tāmaki River also has a marina / ferry wharf at Half Moon Bay, from where commuter ferries depart for the Auckland CBD and car/passenger ferries for Waiheke Island. Many yachts are also moored in its relatively well protected interiors. The river channel is marked with large green buoys. Deep draught vessels should stay close to the buoys as the channel, although averaging 20 metres (66 ft) deep is very narrow in many places. Near the large Point England sand spit there are numerous mudflats which are barely covered at high tide. The speed limit in the river is 10 km/h (5.4 kn). Rocks at the western mouth of the river at St Heliers are marked by a distinctive barber's pole. Vessels of more than 4-metre (13 ft) draught should not attempt the opening between Musick Point and Browns Island. The channel in this area is marked by port and starboard markers about 20 metres (66 ft) apart. It is 0.5 kilometres (0.3 mi) northwest of Musick Point. Large mussel beds extend out 200 metres (660 ft) from Browns Island into the river.
