= Musick Point =

Headland in Auckland, New Zealand

Coordinates: 36.847208°S 174.901357°E

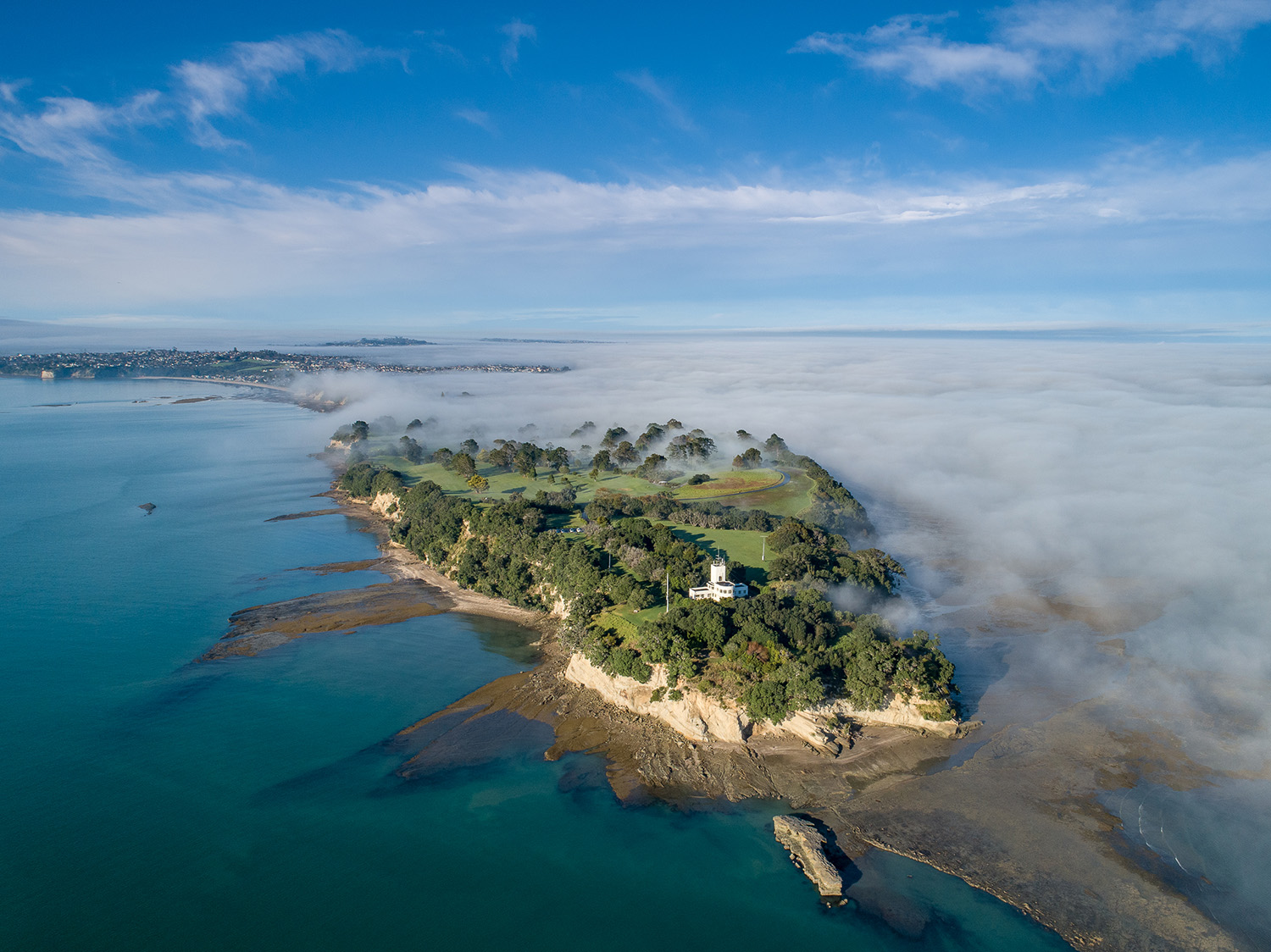
Musick Point Te Naupata from above, emerging from early morning fog

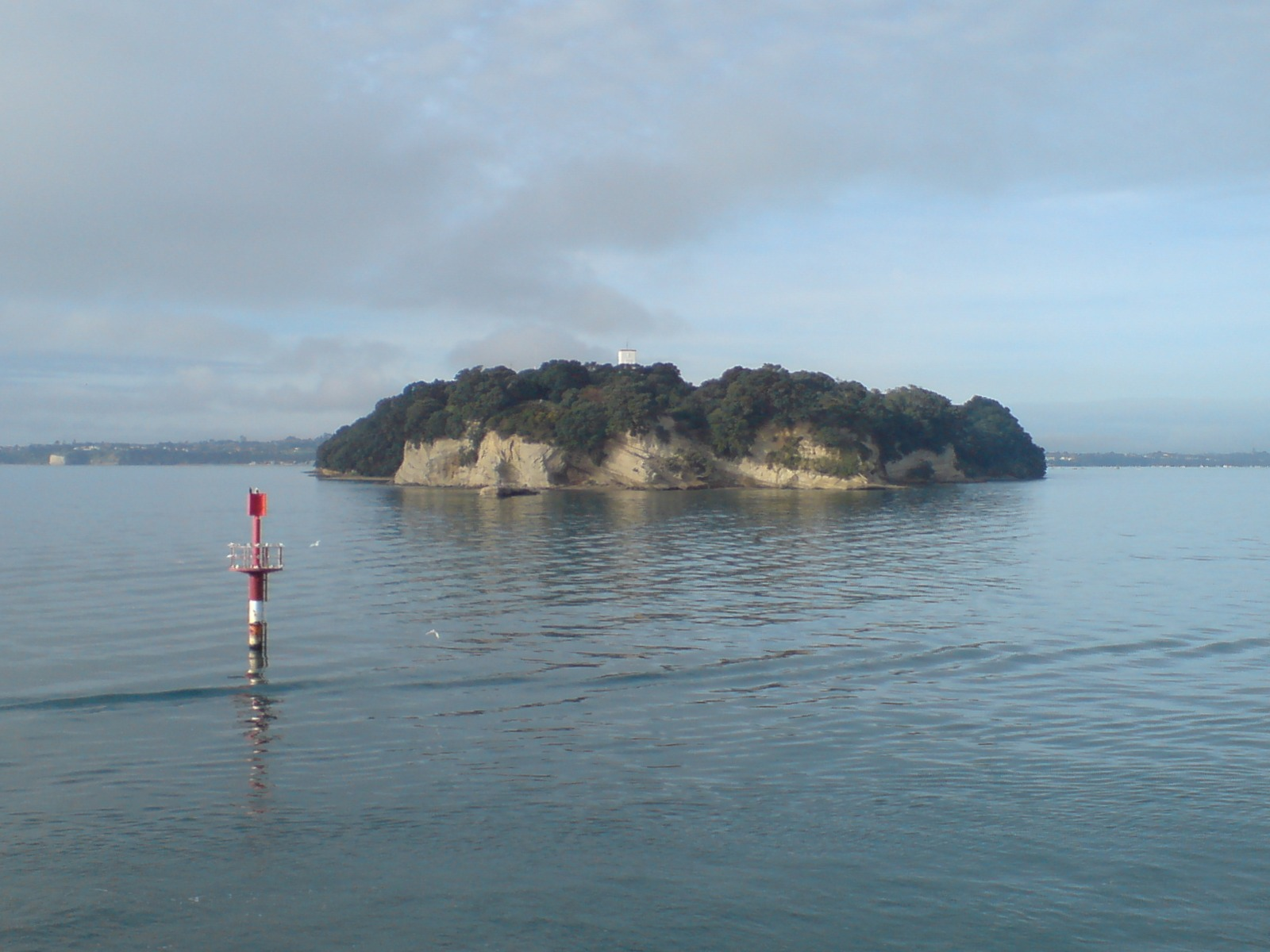
Musick Point from the north

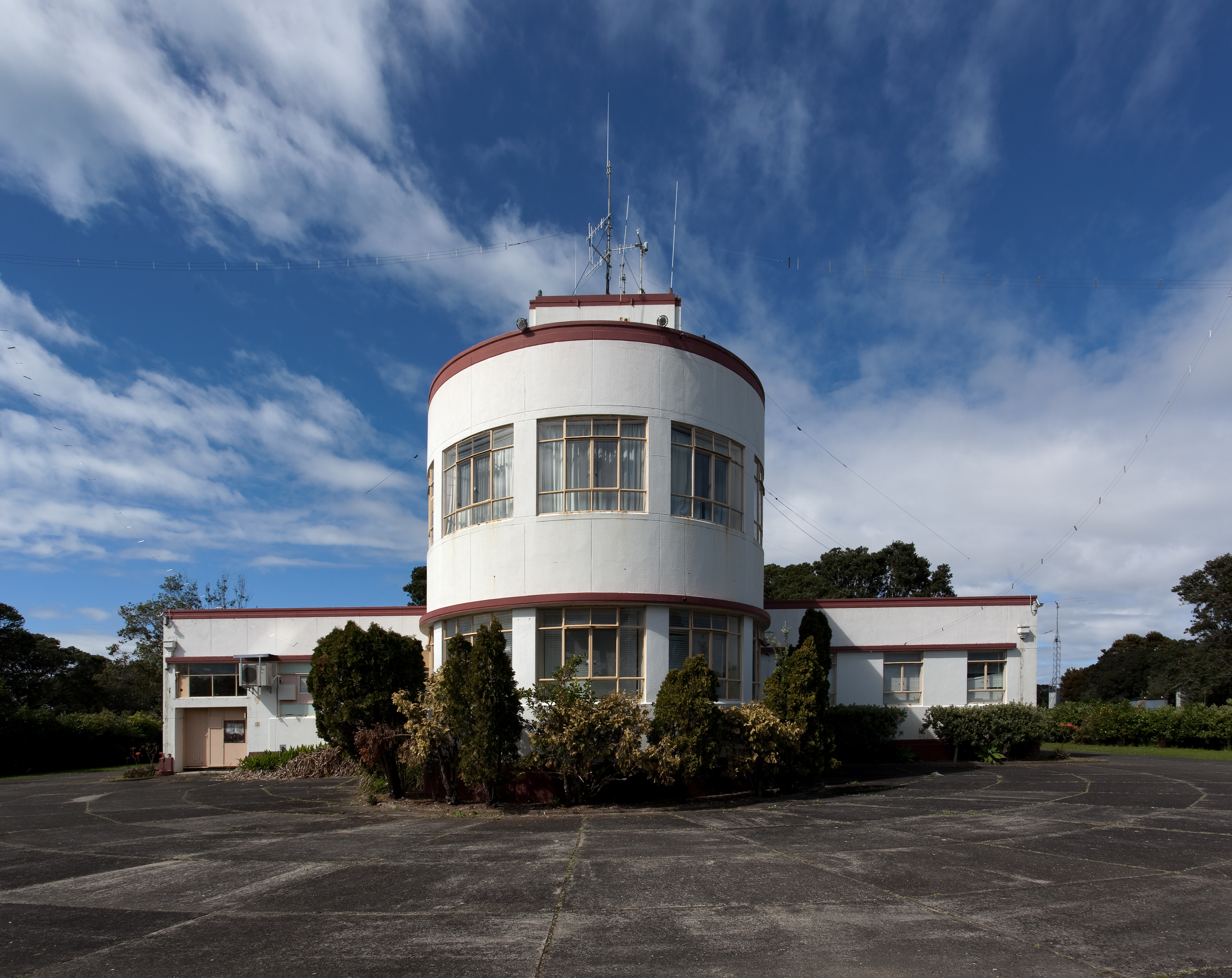
The radio station building

Musick Point (Māori: Te Naupata; officially Musick Point / Te Naupata) is the headland of the peninsula that forms the eastern shore of the Tāmaki River in Bucklands Beach, a suburb of Auckland, New Zealand. In 1942, Musick Point was named after Ed Musick, an aviator who visited New Zealand in 1937, although the headland is also known as Te Waiarohia, after an ancient Māori stronghold. Today, it is occupied by a golf club and the Musick Memorial Radio Station.

The peninsula itself terminates between the Motukorea Channel and the Tāmaki Strait in the Waitematā Harbour, Auckland. The residential areas of Bucklands Beach and Eastern Beach lie immediately to the south.

== History ==
The headland was originally used by Māori of the Ngāi Tai ki Tāmaki iwi (tribe), who dug a ditch across the peninsula as part of Te Waiarohia Pā (sometimes recorded as Te Naupata Pa), until it was overrun by the neighbouring Ngāpuhi iwi in 1821. Parts of the ditch are still clearly visible. The beaches and the sea were plentiful sources of food for the local population.

In 1836, 40,000 acres (160 km^{2}), including the point, were bought by William Thomas Fairburn, a missionary, for 90 blankets, 24 adzes, 24 hoes, 14 spades, 80 pounds (money), 900 lb (410 kg) of tobacco, 24 combs, and 12 plain irons. The land was later parceled up and sold on. During the early settlers era it was called East Head, and until the 1930s it was known as Tāmaki Head.

Today, it is a favourite spot for walking, wedding photos, sightseeing over the harbour and for recreational fishing, as well as being the site of a golf course.

== Radio station ==
The increase in aircraft in the 1930s facilitated the need for international air communication in New Zealand. The headland was chosen due to its remote location in Auckland, leading to the construction of the Streamline Moderne style Musick Memorial Radio Station. The building was constructed in 1940 by DC Street Construction Company, however the events of World War II delayed the official opening of the station until 1942. The station was named after American pilot Ed Musick, whose landing of a Sikorsky S42B, the Samoan Clipper, in Mechanics Bay heralded the beginning of air travel and greater communication with the world for New Zealanders. Upon opening, the station facilitated most of the long range radio transmissions for Auckland, communicating with ships and aircraft, and was used by American naval forces during World War II. A secondary radio bunker was built 300m south of the main building during the war, in case the main station was bombed. Because the area was isolated a water tower was built to store water for the small group of houses and the single workers accommodation that was built at the same time as the station, about 500m to the south of the main radio building.

The isolation of Musick Point, with its absence of man-made electrical interference, made it an ideal radio receiving site and was a welcome improvement over Auckland Radio's previous location in the Chief Post Office in downtown Auckland, which suffered interference from Auckland's electric tramway. Transmitters for the radio station were established a few kilometres away from Musick Point, in Oliver Road, Bucklands Beach, with remote control by the operators at the Point.

The station was the headquarters of the maritime coast station Auckland Radio ZLD, and of aviation radio ZLF. ZLD and ZLF were initially operated by the New Zealand Post Office before the aviation radio service was taken over by the Civil Aviation Corporation, which moved it to Mangere Aerodrome (later Auckland Airport) in 1957. Later, ownership of Auckland Radio changed to Telecom NZ Ltd, and Spark still uses the building for cellular services.

Following the closure of all New Zealand coast radio stations in 1993, ZLD ceased operation from Musick Point and the land became Crown land. The equipment of Auckland Radio ZLD, including most of the Oliver Road transmitters, was acquired by the non-profit Musick Point Radio Group. The Group, which includes several former Musick Point operators and technicians, has a long-term lease on the building, and has reactivated the station on the amateur (ham) radio bands using some of the former ZLD transmitters along with a range of modern equipment. At a 2003 rededication of the building, a plaque recognising the "engineering heritage value" of the station was presented by the Institute of Professional Engineers New Zealand.

In recognition of the station's historical importance, the group has been issued the amateur radio callsigns ZL1ZLD and ZL1ZLF. The Group maintains a radio museum in the building and operates a low-power FM broadcast station with recorded information about Musick Point. One of MPRG's projects was keeping the traditional marine radiotelegraph frequency of 512 kHz alive, and it had a special licence to operate on this frequency which is outside the normal amateur radio bands. These transmissions ceased in mid 2013 when amateurs were allocated a new 630 metre band (427–479 kHz) and authority to operate on 512 kHz was withdrawn.

== Climate ==
Climate data for Musick Point (1991–2020)
Month	Jan	Feb	Mar	Apr	May	Jun	Jul	Aug	Sep	Oct	Nov	Dec	Year
Mean daily maximum °C (°F)	23.0 (73.4)	23.7 (74.7)	22.5 (72.5)	20.5 (68.9)	18.3 (64.9)	16.0 (60.8)	15.1 (59.2)	15.2 (59.4)	16.4 (61.5)	17.8 (64.0)	19.2 (66.6)	21.4 (70.5)	19.1 (66.4)
Daily mean °C (°F)	19.4 (66.9)	20.0 (68.0)	18.7 (65.7)	16.9 (62.4)	14.8 (58.6)	12.6 (54.7)	11.6 (52.9)	11.9 (53.4)	13.0 (55.4)	14.3 (57.7)	15.7 (60.3)	17.8 (64.0)	15.6 (60.0)
Mean daily minimum °C (°F)	15.8 (60.4)	16.4 (61.5)	15.1 (59.2)	13.3 (55.9)	11.3 (52.3)	9.2 (48.6)	8.1 (46.6)	8.6 (47.5)	9.6 (49.3)	10.8 (51.4)	12.2 (54.0)	14.3 (57.7)	12.1 (53.7)
Source: NIWA
