= Somerville, New Zealand =

Somerville
- Suburb
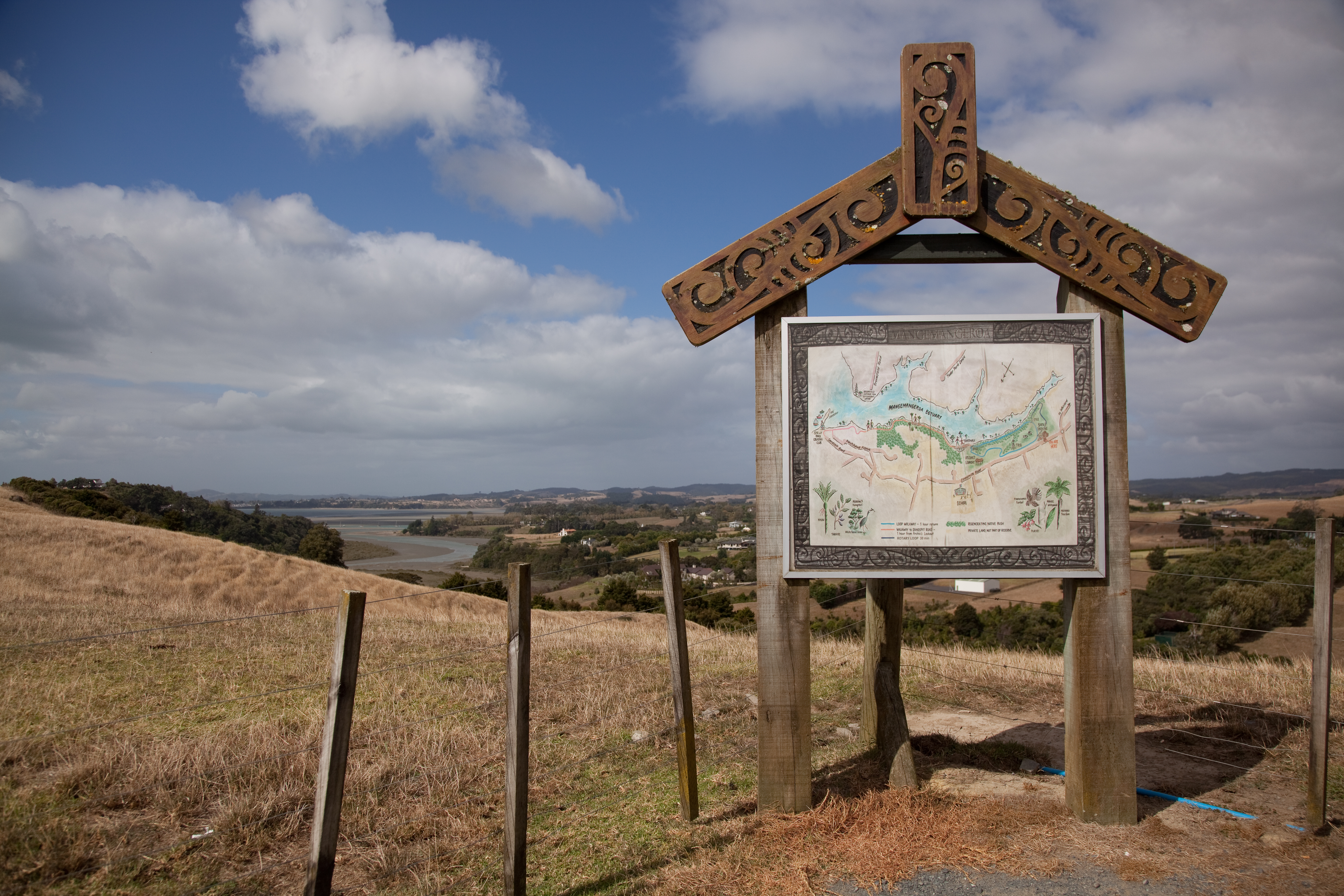
- Mangemangeroa Reserve
- Interactive map of Somerville
- Coordinates: 36.912°S 174.936°E
- Country: New Zealand
- City: Auckland
- Local authority: Auckland Council
- Electoral ward: Howick ward
- Local board: Howick Local Board

Area
  - Land: 156 ha (390 acres)

Population (June 2025)
  - Total: 4,610
  - Density: 2,960/km^{2} (7,650/sq mi)

Botany Downs	Howick	Cockle Bay
Botany Downs	Somerville	Shelly Park
Northpark	Shamrock Park	Whitford

Somerville is a suburb of the city of Auckland, New Zealand, located between Howick and Botany Downs. Most suburban houses in the area were built in the 1990s. Before then, the area was rural. The commercial centre around Meadowlands Drive and Whitford Road is commonly known as Meadowlands.

== Geography ==
Somerville is located on the eastern edges of metropolitan East Auckland, between Whitford Road and Somerville Road. Botany Creek runs west through the suburb to meet the Pakuranga Creek, and the tidal estuary Mangemangeroa Creek is found to the south-east.

== History ==
The Somerville area is part of the rohe of Ngāi Tai ki Tāmaki, who descend from the crew of the Tainui migratory waka, who visited the area around the year 1300. Many Ngāi Tai and Ngāti Pāoa pā sites, middens and other archaeological sites can be found in the Mangemangeroa Valley, which was known for Spiny dogfish pioke found in the estuary. The area was cultivated by Ngāi Tai, and protected by the Tūwakamana Pā at Cockle Bay.

In 1836, English Missionary William Thomas Fairburn brokered a land sale between Tāmaki Māori chiefs covering the majority of modern-day South Auckland, East Auckland and the Pōhutukawa Coast. The sale was envisioned as a way to end hostilities in the area, but it is unclear what the chiefs understood or consented to. Māori continued to live in the area, unchanged by this sale.

In 1847, Howick township was established as a defensive outpost for Auckland, by fencibles (retired British Army soldiers) and their families. Early settlers in the area shot the kūaka and huahou found in the creek, and fencible soldier John Nicholas purchased a farm on Somerville Road in 1851. In 1854 when Fairburn's purchase was investigated by the New Zealand Land Commission, a Ngāi Tai reserve was created around the Wairoa River and Umupuia areas, and as a part of the agreement, members of Ngāi Tai agreed to leave their traditional settlements to the west, near Howick.

The Somerville family began farming the area in 1863, after Archibald Somerville purchased 103 acres of land from Thomas Brady. The family called their farm Paparoa, after the name for the district, and built a two-storied homestead at the intersection of Howick, Whitford and East Tāmaki roads. In the 19th Century, the Whitford Road bridge across the Botany Creek was locally known as Cowbridge, after the skeleton of a large cow that was next to the bridge from 1860 to 1900. Originally the Somerville family grew wheat and oats, but by 1931 switched to dairy and sheep farming. The Somerville family continued to farm the area until 1988, when the farm was sold to be redeveloped as a subdivision. The Somerville family cowshed was moved to Howick Historical Village in 1986.

The first showroom for the new Somerville Estate was exhibited in 1990, and in 1994 the Manukau City Council purchased 22-hectares of the Somerville farm to develop into Mangemangeroa Reserve, which opened in 2000. In the early 1990s, entrepreneur Kit Wong, inspired by his parents' experiences of isolation living in Auckland, developed Meadowlands, a commercial and restaurant space in Somerville as an area for the Chinese New Zealander community. Prime Minister Jim Bolger and Manukau City Mayor Sir Barry Curtis officially opened the centre in 1997. Wong managed the project for ten years. The separate Meadowlands Shopping Plaza on Whitford Road opened in 1993.

By the mid-1990s, significant residential housing had been constructed in the area, and in 1997 Somerville Intermediate School was opened.

In 2009, Manukau City Council proposed a business improvement district for Somerville and Meadowlands, funded by a targeted rate on local businesses. The proposal did not proceed because it did not receive enough support in the required poll. In April 2011, The New Zealand Herald published a report on Meadowlands as part of a series on Chinese New Zealanders. It described the area as one of the most Chinese parts of Auckland.

Over the early-to-mid-2020s, properties within 200 metres of the Meadowlands local centre were proposed to be upzoned to apartment zoning as part of Auckland Council's response to government-directed intensification. In July 2026, the council proposed removing this zoning from smaller local centres as part of a revised plan change.

== Demographics ==
Somerville covers 1.56 km^{2} (0.60 sq mi) and had an estimated population of 4,610 as of June 2025, with a population density of 2,955 people per km^{2}.

Historical population
Year	Pop.	±% p.a.
2006	4,536	—
2013	4,329	−0.67%
2018	4,473	+0.66%
2023	4,338	−0.61%

Somerville had a population of 4,338 in the 2023 New Zealand census, a decrease of 135 people (−3.0%) since the 2018 census, and an increase of 9 people (0.2%) since the 2013 census. There were 2,136 males, 2,196 females and 6 people of other genders in 1,422 dwellings. 2.6% of people identified as LGBTIQ+. The median age was 43.0 years (compared with 38.1 years nationally). There were 729 people (16.8%) aged under 15 years, 687 (15.8%) aged 15 to 29, 2,046 (47.2%) aged 30 to 64, and 876 (20.2%) aged 65 or older.

People could identify as more than one ethnicity. The results were 43.8% European (Pākehā); 4.4% Māori; 2.7% Pasifika; 52.1% Asian; 2.1% Middle Eastern, Latin American and African New Zealanders (MELAA); and 2.6% other, which includes people giving their ethnicity as "New Zealander". English was spoken by 87.1%, Māori language by 0.7%, Samoan by 0.6%, and other languages by 46.9%. No language could be spoken by 1.2% (e.g. too young to talk). New Zealand Sign Language was known by 0.2%. The percentage of people born overseas was 58.4, compared with 28.8% nationally.

Religious affiliations were 31.5% Christian, 3.4% Hindu, 1.7% Islam, 0.1% Māori religious beliefs, 3.8% Buddhist, 0.3% New Age, and 1.9% other religions. People who answered that they had no religion were 51.8%, and 5.5% of people did not answer the census question.

Of those at least 15 years old, 1,194 (33.1%) people had a bachelor's or higher degree, 1,431 (39.7%) had a post-high school certificate or diploma, and 987 (27.3%) people exclusively held high school qualifications. The median income was $42,000, compared with $41,500 nationally. 573 people (15.9%) earned over $100,000 compared to 12.1% nationally. The employment status of those at least 15 was that 1,761 (48.8%) people were employed full-time, 435 (12.1%) were part-time, and 63 (1.7%) were unemployed.

== Commerce ==
The Meadowlands Shopping Plaza is located at 112 Whitford Road. The plaza predates Kit Wong's shopping precinct, which are located across Meadowland Drive. The plaza was built in mid-1993, and a major refurbishment was completed in November 2000. In 2005, the plaza had a Woolworths supermarket, cafe, pharmacy, other specialty shops, and a McDonald's restaurant with a drive-through. An AA branch later opened at the mall. The centre was renovated again in 2011. The supermarket traded as Countdown for several years before returning to the Woolworths name. In May 2020 the mall was sold to a private New Zealand investor for $23.05 million.

Until 2008, a KFC restaurant operated at 90 Whitford Road and there were also previously branches of BNZ, the National Bank, ANZ, and HSBC.

Somerville Shopping Court, a unit-titled retail complex at 119 Meadowland Drive, is located opposite the plaza. Its tenants include an Asian supermarket Tai Ping, medical and dental practices, and restaurants. Through a study of ethnic precincts in Auckland, the sociologists Paul Spoonley and Carina Meares described Wong's precincts, as purpose-built. They contrasted them with older shopping centres, such as Northcote, that became ethnic precincts over time. In May 2010, the centre had 76 premises. Chinese migrants owned 71 percent of these and Koreans 18 percent. Most businesses sold food, and others included hairdressers, travel agents and video shops.

== Education ==
Howick College is a secondary school (years 9–13) with a roll of 2,218. It opened in 1974. Somerville Intermediate School is an intermediate school (years 7–8) with a roll of 957. The school opened in 1997. Both schools are coeducational. Rolls are as of July 2026. Shelly Park School and Cockle Bay School, both contributing primary schools (years 1–6) in neighbouring suburbs, also serve Somerville.

== Amenities ==
- The Cascades Path is an 8 kilometre cycling and walking track along the Botany Creek, that links to Lloyd Elsmore Park.
- Mangemangeroa Reserve is a nature reserve located on the western banks of the Mangemangeroa Creek. A walking track in the reserve follows the coastline to Shelly Park.

== Bibliography ==
- Janssen, Peter (January 2021), Greater Auckland Walks, New Holland Publishers, OL 34023249W, Wikidata Q118136068
- La Roche, Alan (2011a). Grey's Folly: A History of Howick, Pakuranga, Bucklands-Eastern Beaches, East Tamaki, Whitford, Beachlands and Maraetai. Auckland: Tui Vale Productions. ISBN 978-0-473-18547-3. OCLC 1135039710. Wikidata Q118286377.
  - Green, Nathew (2011). "From Hawaīki to Howick – A Ngāi Tai History". In La Roche (2011a), pp. 16–33.
- La Roche, Alan (2011b). A History of Botany (Report). Auckland City Council.
