= Tūranga Creek =

River in Auckland Region, New Zealand

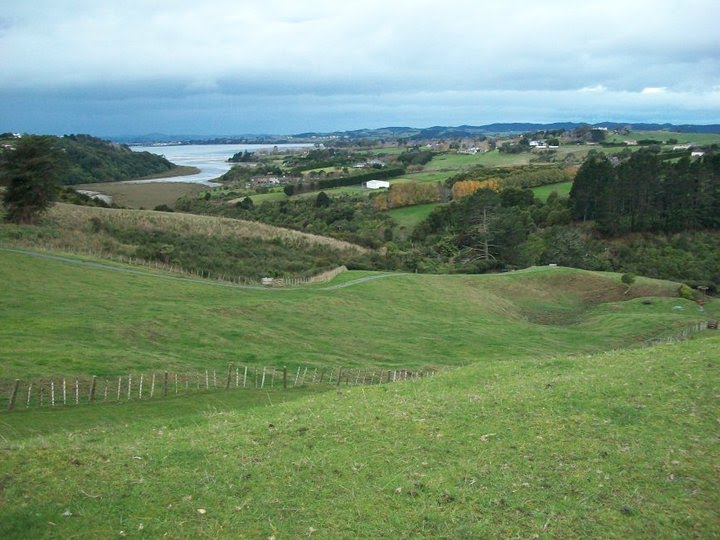
- View of Tūranga Creek from Whitford

- Mouth of the Tūranga Creek Tūranga Creek (New Zealand)
- Route of the Tūranga Creek
- Native name: Tūranga (Māori)

Location
- Country: New Zealand
- Region: Auckland Region

Physical characteristics
- Source
  - coordinates: 36.9859°S 174.949°E
- Mouth: Tāmaki Strait
  - coordinates: 36.8929°S 174.9592°E

Basin features
- Progression: Tūranga Creek → Tāmaki Strait → Hauraki Gulf / Tīkapa Moana → Pacific Ocean
- Landmarks: Wade Island, Whitford
- Tributaries
  - left: Mangemangeroa Creek

Tūranga Creek, also known as the Tūranga River or Tūranga Estuary, is a stream and tidal estuary in the Auckland Region of New Zealand's North Island. The township of Whitford was founded at the navigable headlands of the creek.

== Geography ==
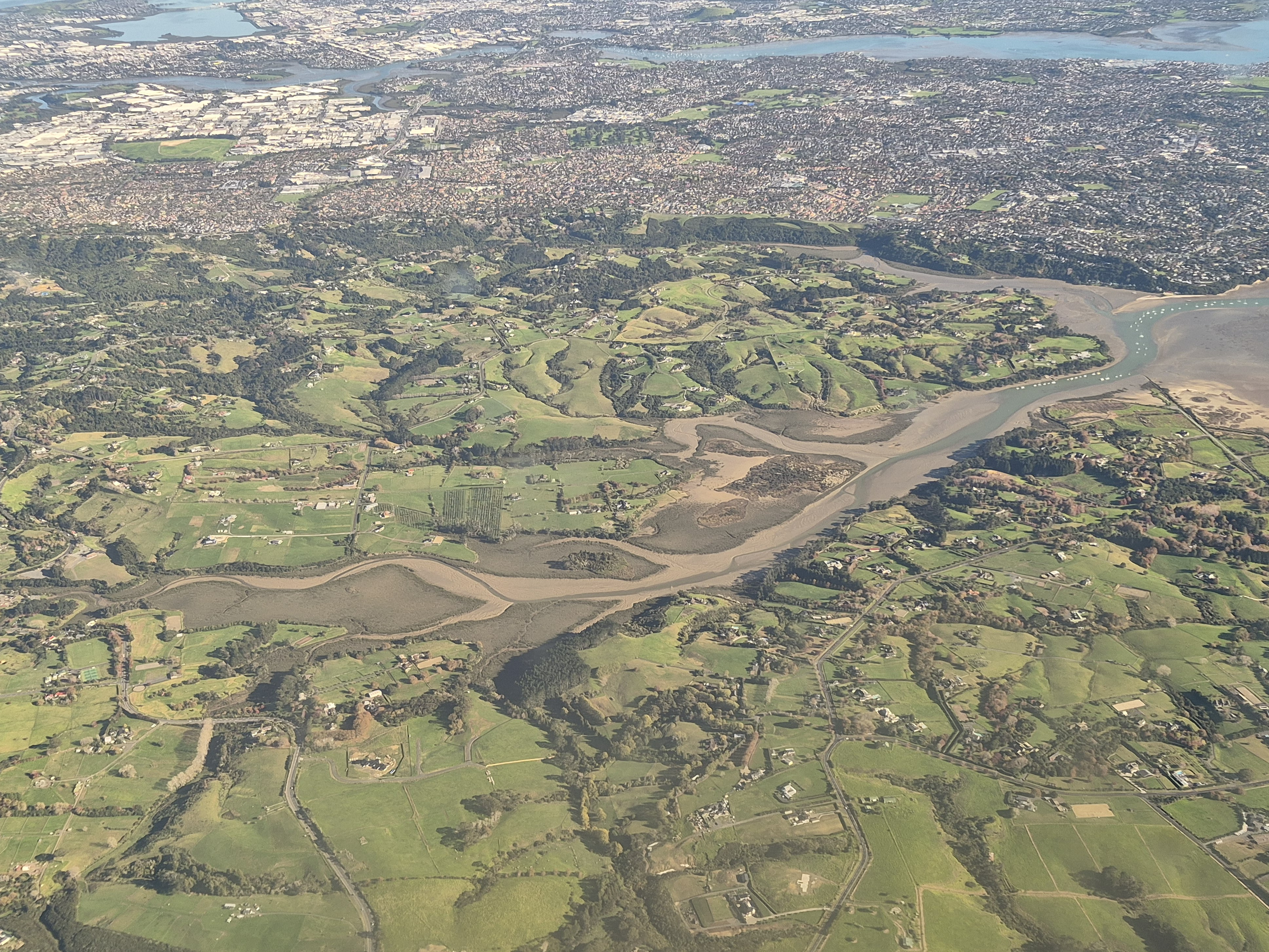
Aerial view of the creek from the east

Tūranga Creek is a drowned valley system. The creek begins in Flat Bush near the intersection of Michael Bosher Way and Redoubt Road, flowing northwards to Whitford and out to the Hauraki Gulf. Wade Island is located in the estuary at the mouth of the creek, named after the early European settlers Isaac and Eve Wade, who purchased the island in 1852.

== History ==
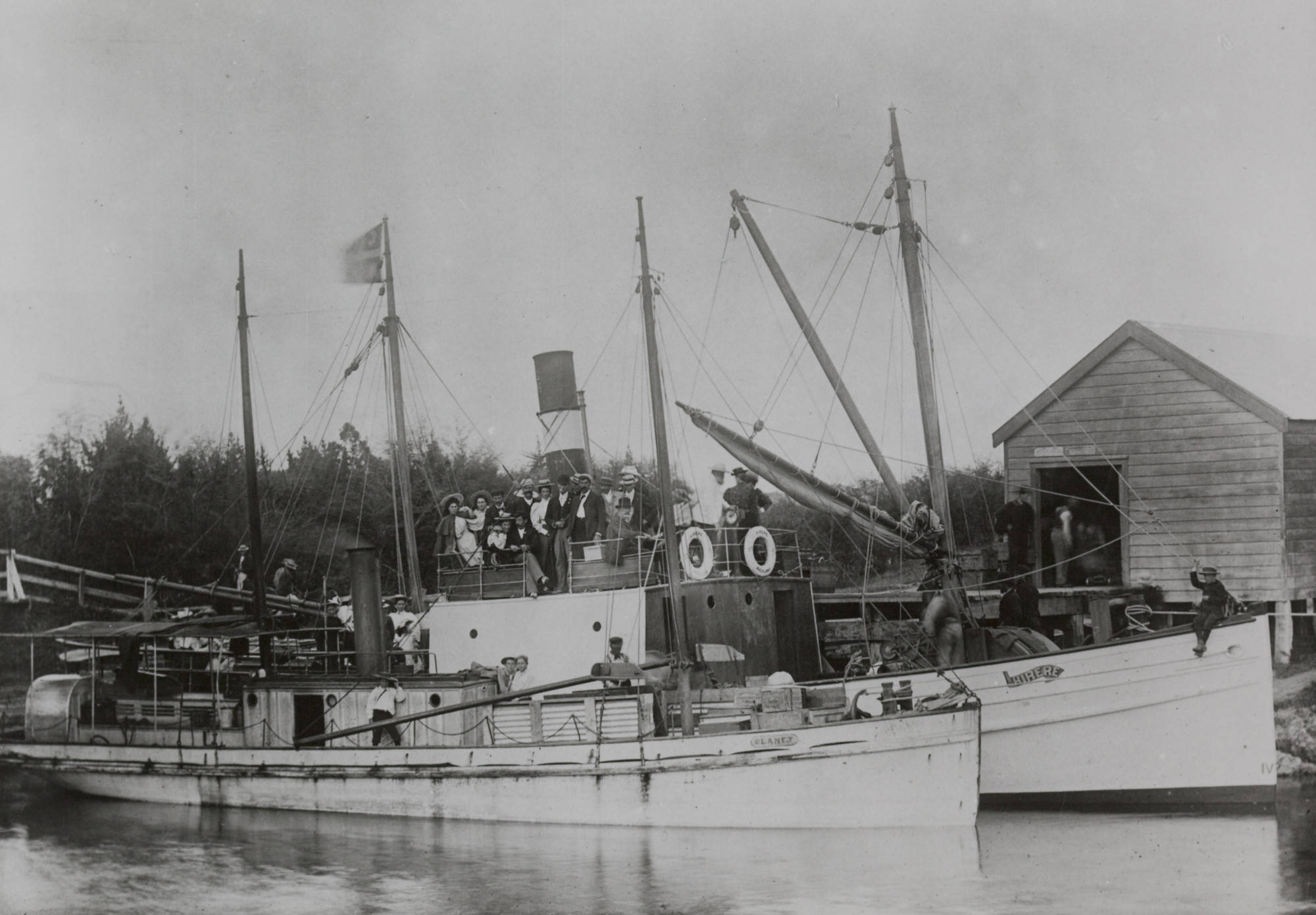
View of the Whitford Wharf on Tūranga Creek in 1897

The eastern coast of Auckland was visited by the Tainui migratory waka around the year 1300. The waka landed at Tūranga Creek, tethered to a volcanic rock in the shape of a man. This gave rise to the name of the creek, Tūranga, which means "Anchorage". The anchor can still be found today, and is a 1.5 metre in diameter siliceous sinter found in the mudflats near Clifton Road. Tainui followers of Manawatere, who identified as Ngā Oho, decided to settle the area between the Pōhutukawa Coast and Tūwakamana (Cockle Bay). Ngāi Tai ki Tāmaki, the mana whenua of the area, descend from these early settlers. Ngāi Tai ki Tāmaki traditional stories talk about the land already being occupied by the supernatural Tūrehu people, and many place names in the area reference Tūrehu figures, such as Hinerangi and Manawatere. Tūranga became the name of the hill overlooking the west bank of the estuary, and the name was applied to the pā and kāinga of the estuary.

The creek area was known as a traditional source for eels (tuna), lampreys (kanakana) and flounder (pātiki). When William Thomas Fairburn visited the area in 1833, it was mostly unoccupied due to the events of the Musket Wars, as most members of Ngāi Tai had fled to temporary refuge in the Waikato. In 1836, Fairburn purchased 40,000 acres between Ōtāhuhu and Umupuia (Duders Beach), including much of the catchment of the Wairoa River. Fairburn's Purchase was investigated by the New Zealand Land Commission in 1841 and 1842 and found to be excessive and reduced in size. The disallowed parts of his purchase were not returned to Ngāi Tai, however in 1854 a reserve was created for Ngāi Tai around Umupuia.

The town of Whitford was established on the creek in the 1840s by European settlers. The creek was the main transport link for the town to the outside world until the 1920s, when road transport became more popular. In the late 1870s, John Granger established a brickworks along the shores of the creek. During World War II, home guard soldiers dug trenches along the creek.

== Amenities ==
Wades Walkway, also known as the Whitford Path, starts in Whitford, and follows the western banks of Tūranga Creek.

== Bibliography ==
- Janssen, Peter (January 2021), Greater Auckland Walks, New Holland Publishers, OL 34023249W, Wikidata Q118136068
- La Roche, Alan (2011). Grey's Folly: A History of Howick, Pakuranga, Bucklands-Eastern Beaches, East Tamaki, Whitford, Beachlands and Maraetai. Auckland: Tui Vale Productions. ISBN 978-0-473-18547-3. OCLC 1135039710. Wikidata Q118286377.
