= Cockle Bay, New Zealand =

Cockle Bay
- Suburb
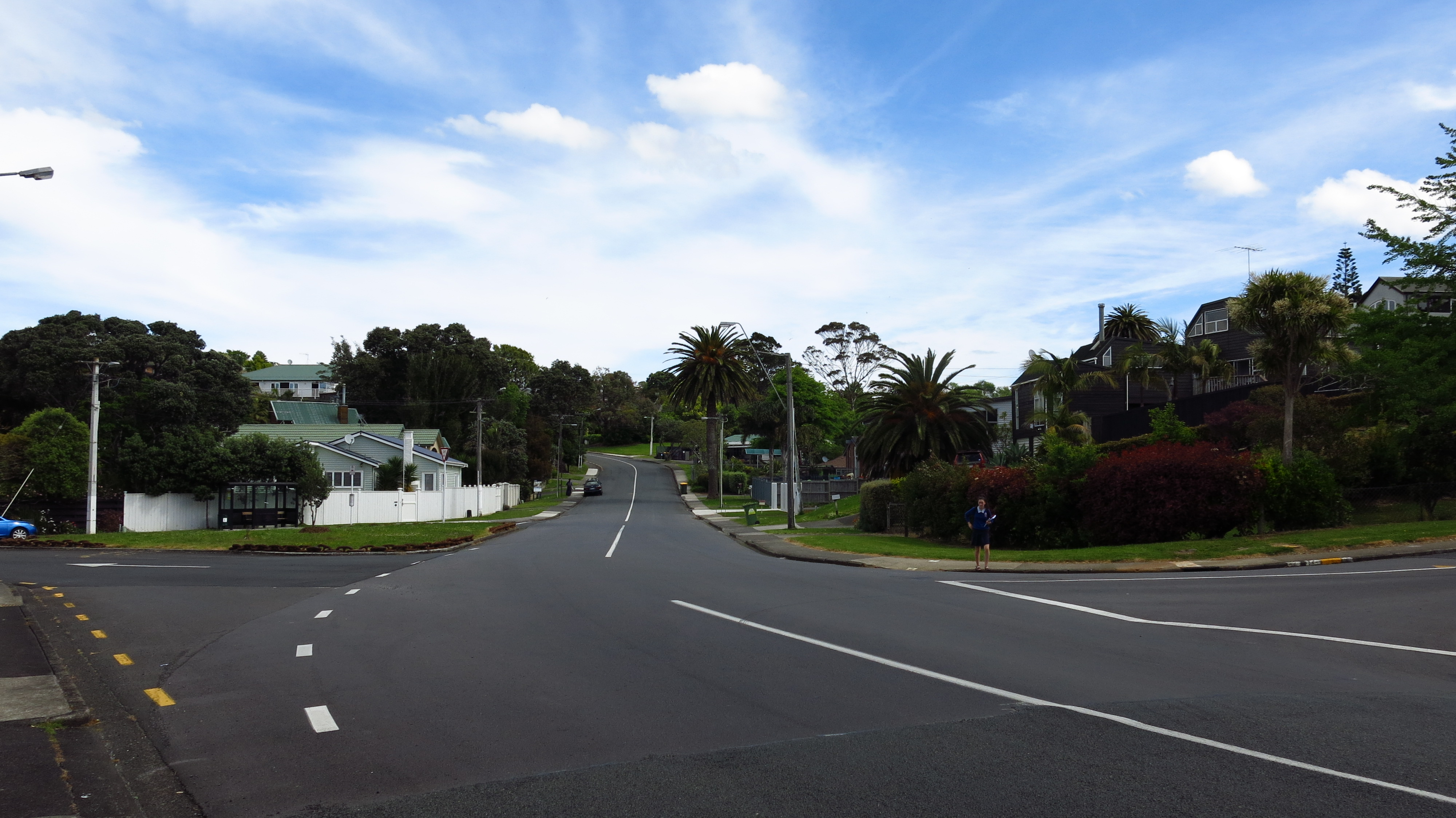
- Suburban Cockle Bay
- Interactive map of Cockle Bay
- Coordinates: 36°53′58″S 174°56′56″E
- Country: New Zealand
- City: Auckland
- Local authority: Auckland Council
- Electoral ward: Howick ward
- Local board: Howick Local Board

Area
  - Land: 173 ha (430 acres)

Population (June 2025)
  - Total: 4,360
  - Density: 2,520/km^{2} (6,530/sq mi)

Mellons Bay	(Hauraki Gulf)	(Hauraki Gulf)
Howick Central	Cockle Bay	(Hauraki Gulf)
Somerville	Shelly Park	(Hauraki Gulf)

Cockle Bay is a suburb of East Auckland, New Zealand. The suburb is in the Howick local board, one of the 21 administrative divisions of Auckland.

== Geography ==
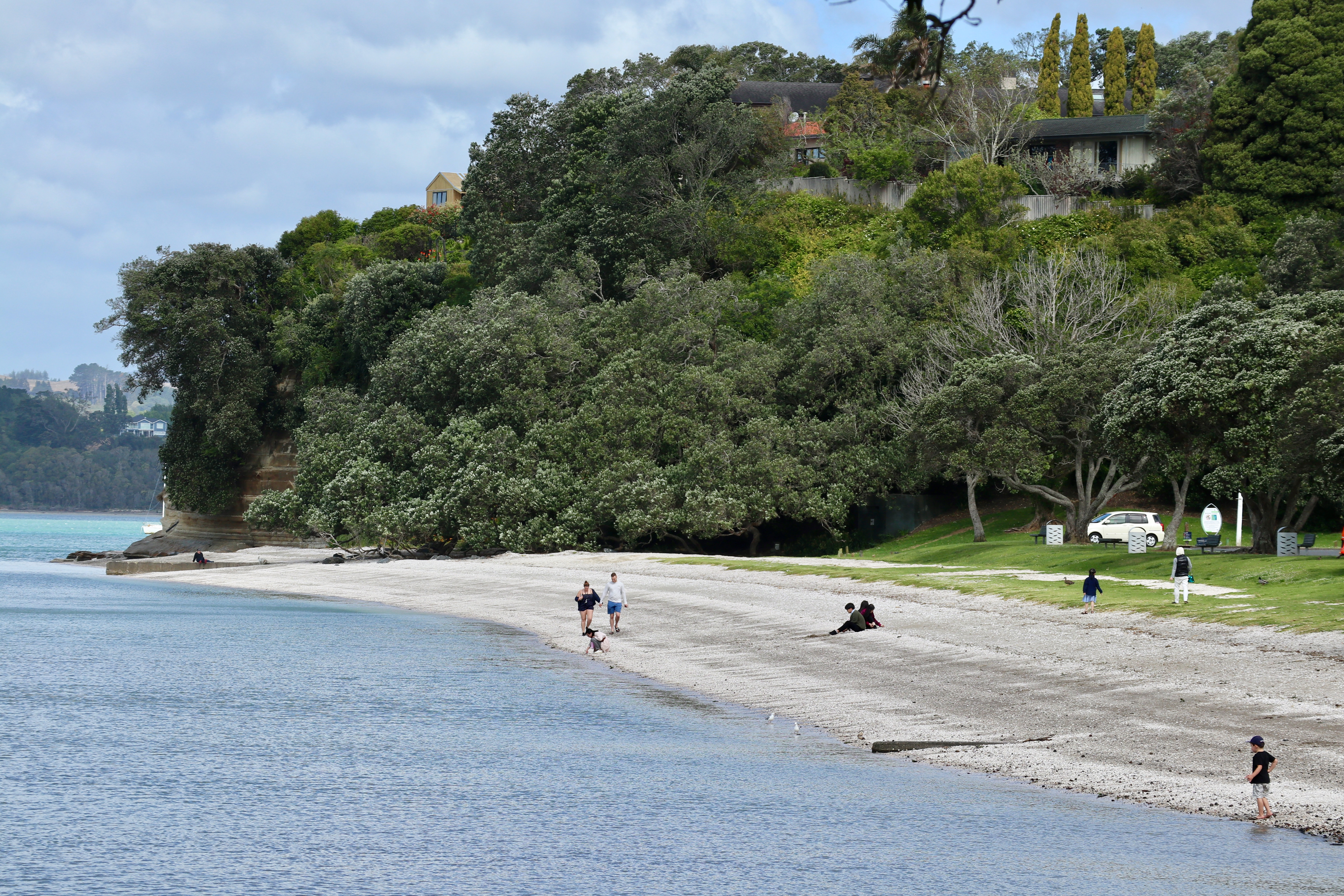
Cockle Bay Beach

Cockle Bay is located on the eastern edges of metropolitan East Auckland, along the Hauraki Gulf coast. The bay itself is located to the east of the suburb, and looks out towards the Tāmaki Strait, Motukaraka Island and Beachlands.

== History ==
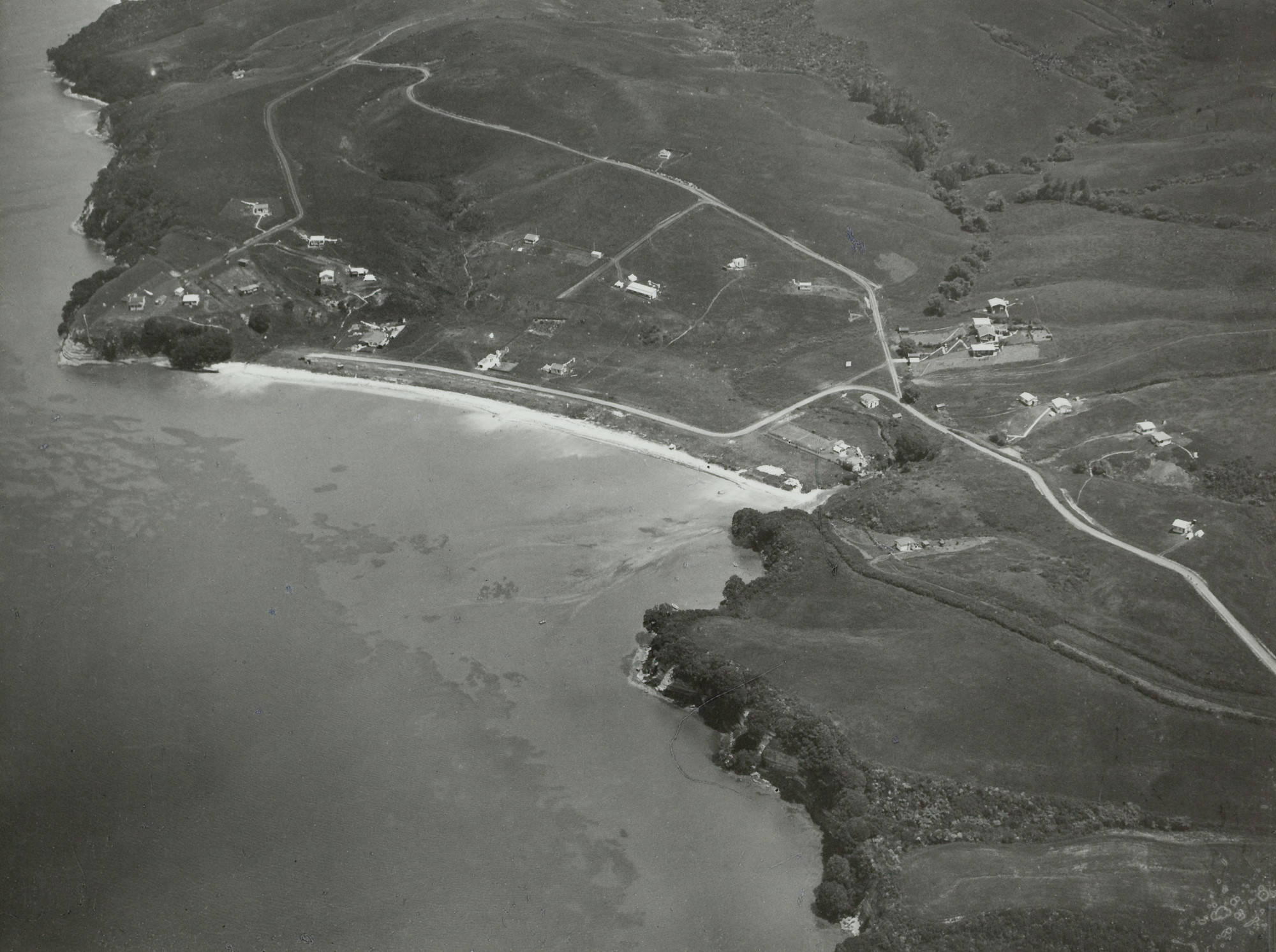
Aerial view of Cockle Bay in 1928

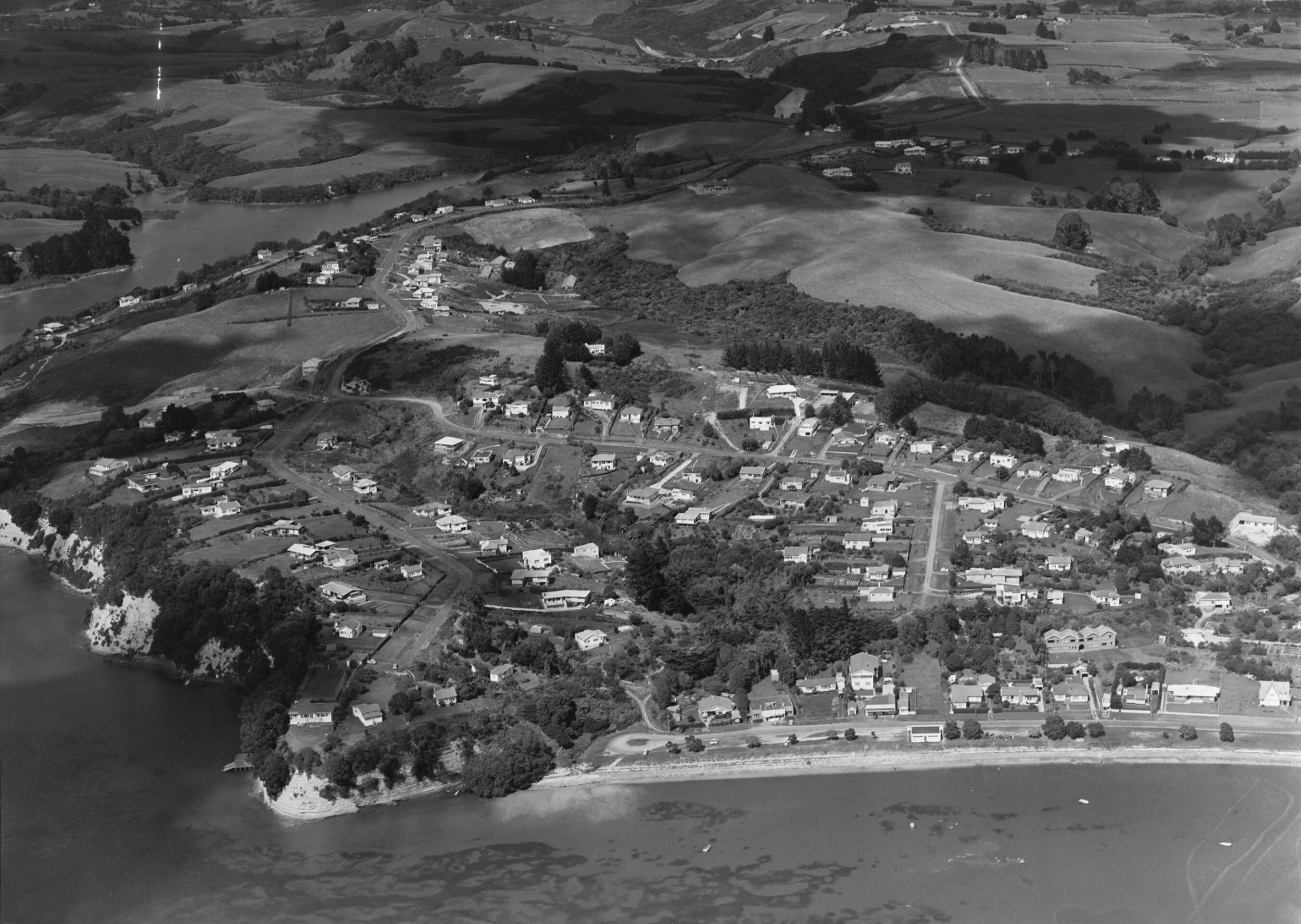
Aerial view of Cockle Bay in 1959

The Cockle Bay area is part of the rohe of Ngāi Tai ki Tāmaki, who descend from the crew of the Tainui migratory waka, who visited the area around the year 1300. The traditional name for the bay and surrounding area is Tūwakamana, a shortened version of Te Tūranga-waka-ā-Manawatere. The name recalls the story of the arrival of the Tainui. When the crew arrived, they noticed that Tainui ancestor Manawatere had recently visited the bay, and left a red ochre marking on a pōhutukawa tree, as a sign that the bay was a good place to settle. The followers of Manawatere settled the area from Maraetai to Tūwakamana.

The area was widely cultivated by Ngāi Tai, and protected by the Tūwakamana Pā at Cockle Bay, which commanded a view of the wider Turanga Estuary. In addition to traditional cultivations (māra), the bay was an important source of source of tuangi (New Zealand cockles), and even in modern times the bay has some of the most extensive cockle beds in the Auckland Region. Tūwakamana Pā was built by the ancestor Keteanatua, and was abandoned in 1821 during the Musket Wars. Most members of Ngāi Tai fled to the Waikato for temporary refuge during this time, and when missionary William Thomas Fairburn visited the area in 1833, it was mostly unoccupied.

In 1836, English Missionary William Thomas Fairburn brokered a land sale between Tāmaki Māori chiefs covering the majority of modern-day South Auckland, East Auckland and the Pōhutukawa Coast. The sale was envisioned as a way to end hostilities in the area, but it is unclear what the chiefs understood or consented to. Māori continued to live in the area, unchanged by this sale. In 1847, Howick township was established as a defensive outpost for Auckland, by fencibles (retired British Army soldiers) and their families. In 1854 when Fairburn's purchase was investigated by the New Zealand Land Commission, a Ngāi Tai reserve was created around the Wairoa River and Umupuia areas, and as a part of the agreement, members of Ngāi Tai agreed to leave their traditional settlements to the west, near Howick.

The first European landowner at Cockle Bay was Anglican Reverend Vicesimus Lush, who bought 413 acres in 1853, where he grew oats, potatoes and buckwheat. John Gill bought this farm in 1865. Around 1921, the early New Zealand film The Birth of New Zealand (1922) was shot around Cockle Bay.

The area was subdivided in September 1923, advertised as Cockle Bay Estate, a seaside resort. The new residents of Cockle Bay formed a close-knit community, separate from the nearby township of Howick. During the 1920s, the Chinese community in New Zealand organised large-scale picnics, that were held at Cockle Bay. Cockle Bay was divided between the Howick Town District and the Manukau County. After numerous disputes over maintenance costs, the entirely of Cockle Bay was incorporated into Howick in 1931. In 1934, a nine-hole golf course was established at Cockle Bay, moving to Musick Point in 1954.

After the 1950s, the holiday community gradually became a suburb of Auckland. The community held annual Guy Fawkes bonfires from the 1960s until the early 1970s, where competitions were held for the best effigy to burn. In 1978, the area expanded when the Waikiteroa subdivision was sold in northern Cockle Bay.

== Demographics ==
Cockle Bay covers 1.73 km^{2} (0.67 sq mi) and had an estimated population of 4,360 as of June 2025, with a population density of 2,520 people per km^{2}.

Historical population
Year	Pop.	±% p.a.
2006	4,116	—
2013	4,080	−0.13%
2018	4,224	+0.70%
2023	4,239	+0.07%

Cockle Bay had a population of 4,239 in the 2023 New Zealand census, an increase of 15 people (0.4%) since the 2018 census, and an increase of 159 people (3.9%) since the 2013 census. There were 2,136 males, 2,082 females and 18 people of other genders in 1,467 dwellings. 2.2% of people identified as LGBTIQ+. The median age was 44.2 years (compared with 38.1 years nationally). There were 732 people (17.3%) aged under 15 years, 741 (17.5%) aged 15 to 29, 1,962 (46.3%) aged 30 to 64, and 798 (18.8%) aged 65 or older.

People could identify as more than one ethnicity. The results were 80.6% European (Pākehā); 5.6% Māori; 2.5% Pasifika; 17.0% Asian; 1.7% Middle Eastern, Latin American and African New Zealanders (MELAA); and 1.7% other, which includes people giving their ethnicity as "New Zealander". English was spoken by 96.2%, Māori language by 0.5%, Samoan by 0.5%, and other languages by 19.2%. No language could be spoken by 1.2% (e.g. too young to talk). New Zealand Sign Language was known by 0.3%. The percentage of people born overseas was 38.8, compared with 28.8% nationally.

Religious affiliations were 37.4% Christian, 1.3% Hindu, 0.4% Islam, 0.9% Buddhist, 0.2% New Age, 0.1% Jewish, and 1.7% other religions. People who answered that they had no religion were 51.4%, and 6.5% of people did not answer the census question.

Of those at least 15 years old, 1,158 (33.0%) people had a bachelor's or higher degree, 1,755 (50.0%) had a post-high school certificate or diploma, and 588 (16.8%) people exclusively held high school qualifications. The median income was $51,000, compared with $41,500 nationally. 765 people (21.8%) earned over $100,000 compared to 12.1% nationally. The employment status of those at least 15 was that 1,824 (52.0%) people were employed full-time, 564 (16.1%) were part-time, and 63 (1.8%) were unemployed.

== Education ==
Cockle Bay School is a coeducational contributing primary school (years 1–6) with a roll of 756 as of July 2025. The school opened in 1956, originally operating from temporary classrooms from Howick District High School (present-day Howick Intermediate School), due to muddy grounds. The Cockle Bay campus officially opened on 22 March 1958. The school originally served Cockle Bay and the rural surrounding area, as far as Whitford. The local high school is Howick College, a decile 8 school in Howick.
