= Cockle Bay School =

Primary school in New Zealand

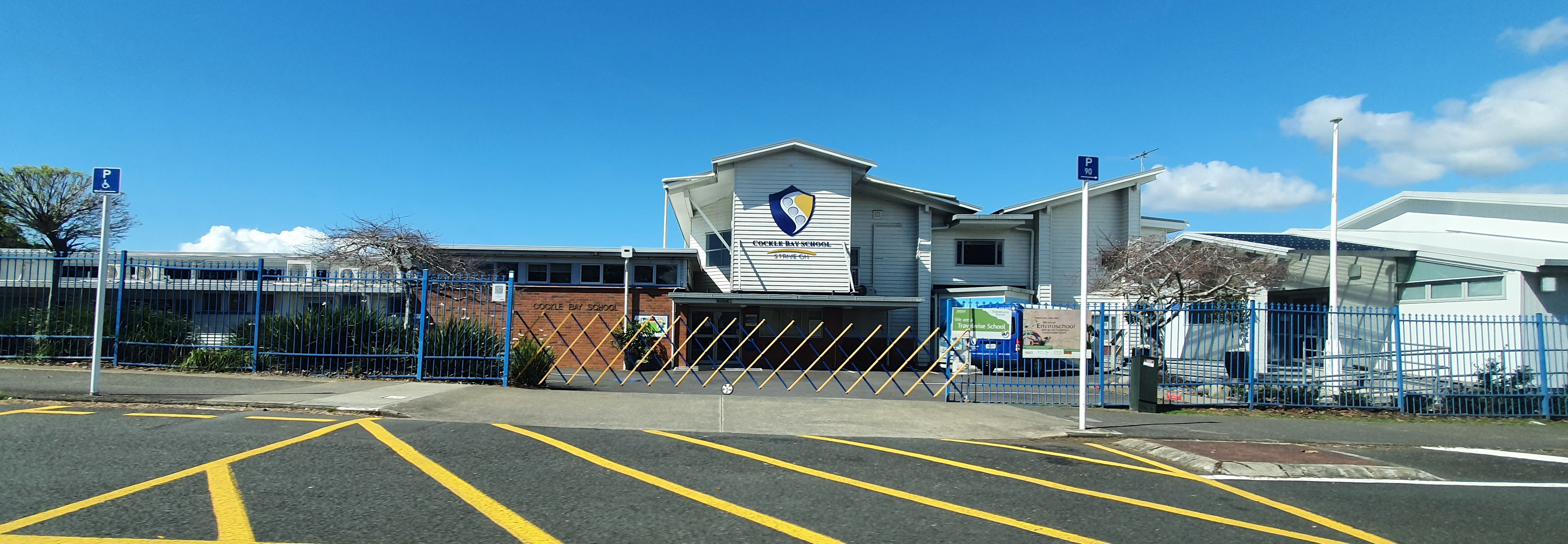

Location
- Sandspit Road, Howick, South Auckland, New Zealand; 36.905375°S 174.939457°E

Information
- Type: State, co-educational, contributing
- Motto: Strive On
- Ministry of Education Institution no.: 1253
- Principal: Dorothy Bigwood
- Enrolment: 737 (July 2026)
- Socio-economic decile: 10
- Website: www.cocklebay.school.nz

Cockle Bay School is a primary school serving the community of Cockle Bay, which is a suburb of Auckland, New Zealand.

== History ==
Cockle Bay School was established on 3 September 1956 as a full primary school with a roll of 217, almost all of whom were transfers from Howick District High School (now Howick Intermediate School). All bus children from the Whitford area were included in this transfer.

Although the six classrooms, administration block and sick bay were complete, the grounds were a sea of mud in wet weather, so the new school began life as a line of prefabs at Howick District High School. The headmaster W E Tonks used the old dental clinic as his office.

Over the years the school has maintained steady growth, except for a brief time in 1965 when Forms 1 and 2 left to attend Howick Intermediate School. The roll reached its all-time high roll of 796 in 1976 and this hastened the setting up of Shelly Park Primary School which opened in 1979.

At its largest, the school comprised 12 permanent classrooms and 11 prefabs, three of which were built on the site. Room 4 was donated by the Auckland Education Board when it became surplus to requirements in 1980. The School Committee and PTA developed it into a resource room. The infant library was built by voluntary labour and funded by the School Committee and PTA to provide library facilities for infant classes and to relieve crowding in the main school library.

The swimming pool was opened in 1964 having cost about $4000 and hundreds of hours of voluntary labour. A small surplus from this project formed the nucleus of the Hall Fund and in 1969 the hall, at a cost of $22,000, was officially opened by Hon George Gair.

Since its earliest days the school has been noted for the tremendous support of its parents. Annual galas and donations have provided almost all the present playground amenities and outside facilities, with working bee labour extending over the entire period of the school's existence.

Several staff members have each served at the school for periods up to 25 years, and Mrs S Austin was School Secretary from 1966 - 1989.

Now the school is expanding with new rooms 29, 30, and 31, a bigger hall, a new music room and the rebuilding of many of the early classrooms.

Since it was established the school has had only seven Principals:

- W E Tonks, 1956 - 1963
- H. J. Bates, 1964 - 1967
- K. W. Peterson, 1968 - 1984
- N. P. Beach, 1985 - 1988
- S.N. Baty, 1989 - 2005
- G.R. Lomas, 2005 - 2016
- D. Bigwood, 2016 -

The school is involved in environmental activities, including recycling and worm farming.

Christopher Luxon, the Prime-Minister designate of New Zealand, attended this primary school.
