= Whitford, New Zealand =

Whitford
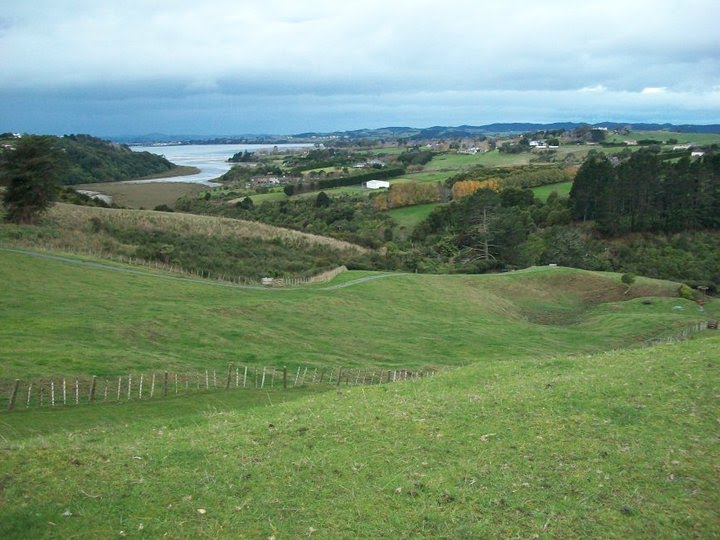
- The Pacific Coast highway near Whitford has views of the surrounding countryside, farms, and Hauraki Gulf
- Interactive map of Whitford
- Coordinates: 36.945°S 174.964°E
- Country: New Zealand
- Region: Auckland Region
- Ward: Franklin ward
- Board: Franklin Local Board
- Electorates: Papakura; Hauraki-Waikato

Government
  - Territorial Authority: Auckland Council
  - Mayor of Auckland: Wayne Brown
  - Papakura MP: Vacant
  - Hauraki-Waikato MP: Hana-Rawhiti Maipi-Clarke

Area
  - Total: 0.18 km^{2} (0.069 sq mi)

Population (June 2025)
  - Total: 170
  - Density: 940/km^{2} (2,400/sq mi)

Whitford is a rural town to the south-east of Auckland, New Zealand, located on the Pōhutukawa Coast. The area is a part of the rohe of Ngāi Tai ki Tāmaki, who settled around the Turanga Creek area. Whitford developed into a rural township in the 19th Century, known for its ostriches, thoroughbred horses, and quarry.

== Geography ==
Whitford is located at the mouth of the Turanga Creek, an estuarial arm of the Hauraki Gulf. It is 20 kilometres south-east of the Auckland City Centre.

== Etymology ==
Until 1882, the area was called Turanga by European settlers. There are multiple versions of where the name Whitford came from. It may be named after Richard Whitford, a man who operated a flax mill on the Waikopua near Housons Creek and was the postman. Others think Whitford referred to the White-ford over the Turanga Creek at the end of Sandstone Road, where the salt dries when the tide is out. Another possibility is that it is named after Whitefoord Park part of a vast property belonging to L.D. Nathan was initially listed as 'Whitefoord Park' in Wises Post Office Directory for 1875–1876, but by the time it went on sale for subdivision in 1903 it was known as Whitford Park.

== History ==
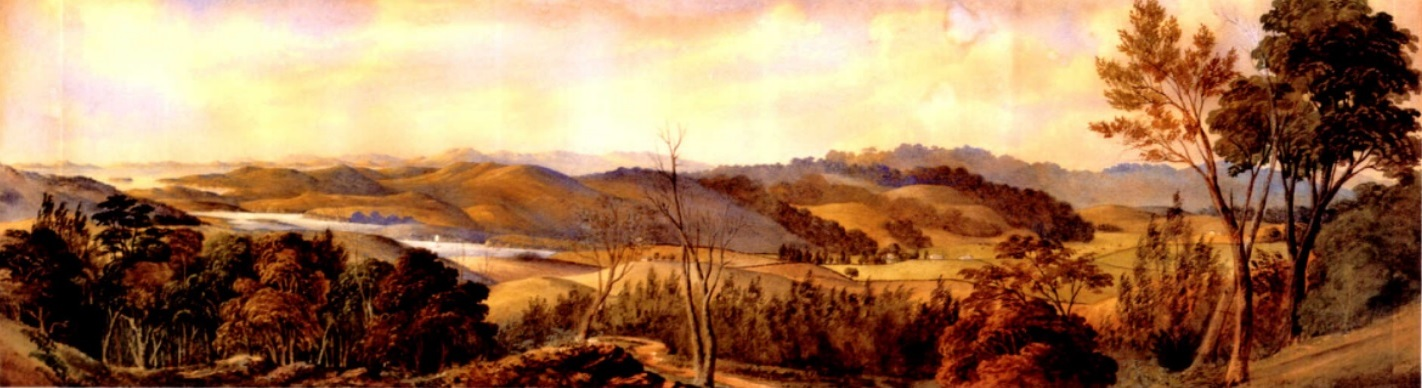
Watercolour view of Whitford circa 1869, painted by John Hoyte

The Pōhutukawa Coast was visited by the Tainui migratory waka around the year 1300. The waka landed at Tūranga Creek, tethered to a volcanic rock in the shape of a man. This gave rise to the name of the creek, which means "Anchorage". Tainui followers of Manawatere, who identified as Ngā Oho, decided to settle the area between the Pōhutukawa Coast and Tūwakamana (Cockle Bay). Ngāi Tai ki Tāmaki, the mana whenua of the area, descend from these early settlers. Ngāi Tai ki Tāmaki traditional stories talk about the land already being occupied by the supernatural Tūrehu people, and many place names in the area reference Tūrehu figures, such as Hinerangi and Manawatere. Tūranga became the name of the hill overlooking the west bank of the estuary, and the name was applied to the pā and kāinga of the estuary.

The Tūranga Creek area was known as a traditional food source for eels (tuna), lampreys (kanakana), flounder (pātiki) and kererū. There were multiple pā and kāinga sites in the area, including Moananui, Mangemangeroa and Awakarihi (above the Whitford quarry). When William Thomas Fairburn visited the area in 1833, it was mostly unoccupied due to the events of the Musket Wars, as most members of Ngāi Tai had fled to temporary refuge in the Waikato. In 1836, Fairburn purchased 40,000 acres between Ōtāhuhu and Umupuia (Duders Beach), including much of the catchment of the Wairoa River. Fairburn's Purchase was investigated by the New Zealand Land Commission in 1841 and 1842 and found to be excessive and reduced in size. The disallowed parts of his purchase were not returned to Ngāi Tai, however in 1854 a reserve was created for Ngāi Tai around Umupuia.

Whitford's first European settlers, George and William Trice, arrived from Kent in England in 1841. They started a popular and productive farm on Clifton Road near the village settlement in 1843, primarily growing potatoes and employing local members of Ngāi Tai. Over time, the farm grew to 1,000 acres. The family established an unproductive gold mine, which later became the Whitford Quarry and was used as a landfill. The Trice family were followed by more settlers in the mid-1850s, including Isaac and Eve Wade from Wells, Somerset. The first wooden bridge across the Mangemangeroa Creek to the west was constructed in the 1860s, better connecting the community to Auckland by road. Despite the bridge, transport to the community usually occurred via water until the 1920s, when roads and motor transport were improved.

In September 1863 during the Invasion of the Waikato, the Ngāi Tai village of Ōtau near Clevedon was attacked by the British army, and the village was evacuated, living in communities at the river's mouth. For the remainder of the war, Ngāi Tai were designated as a "friendly" people by the Crown, and remained neutral in the fighting. After the Native Lands Act of 1865, the Native Land Court confiscated many Ngāi Tai lands. The remaining land was individuated, slowly sold on to European farmers.

=== Farming community ===
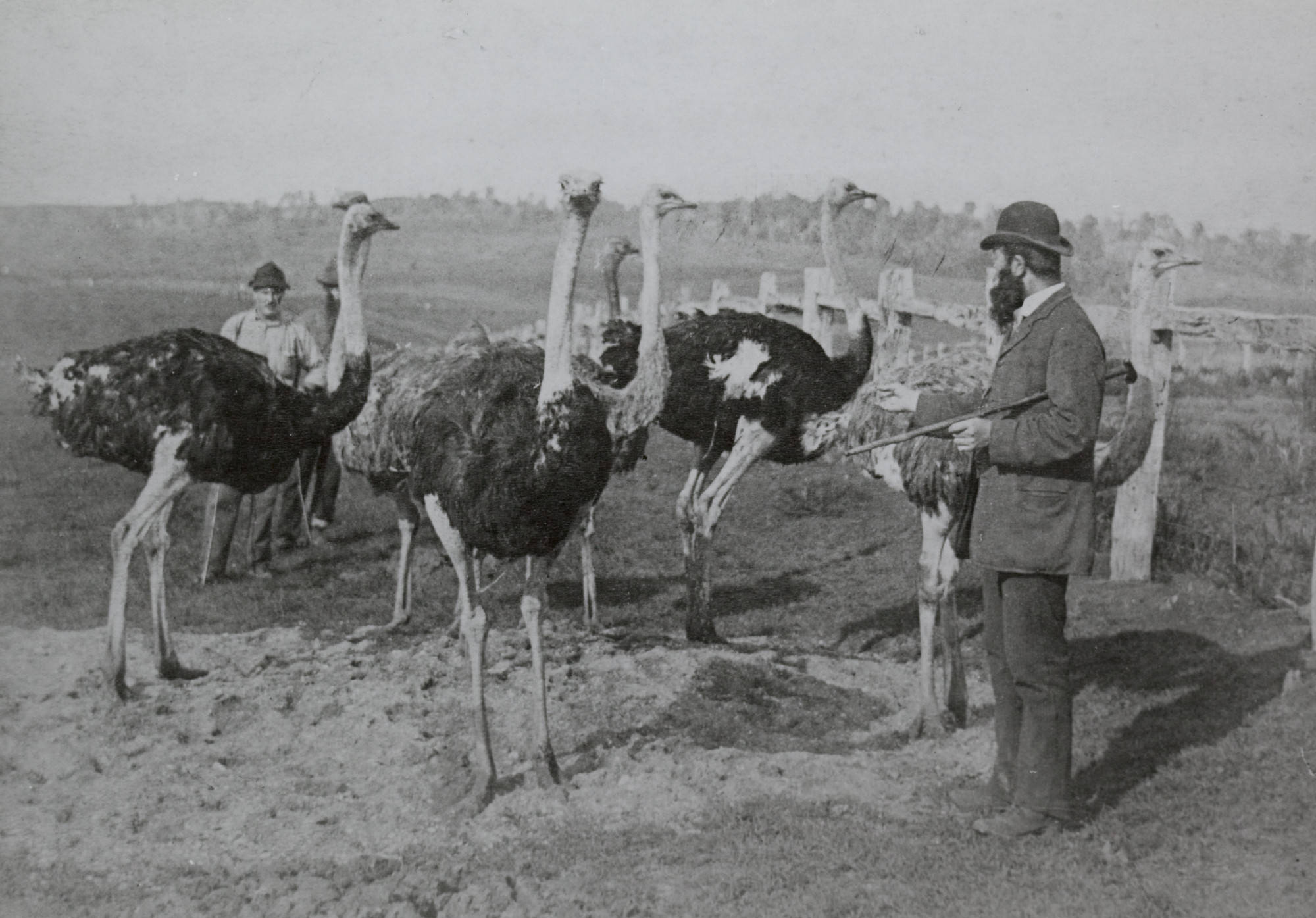
The Nathan family ostrich farm at Whitford Park Estate, circa 1900

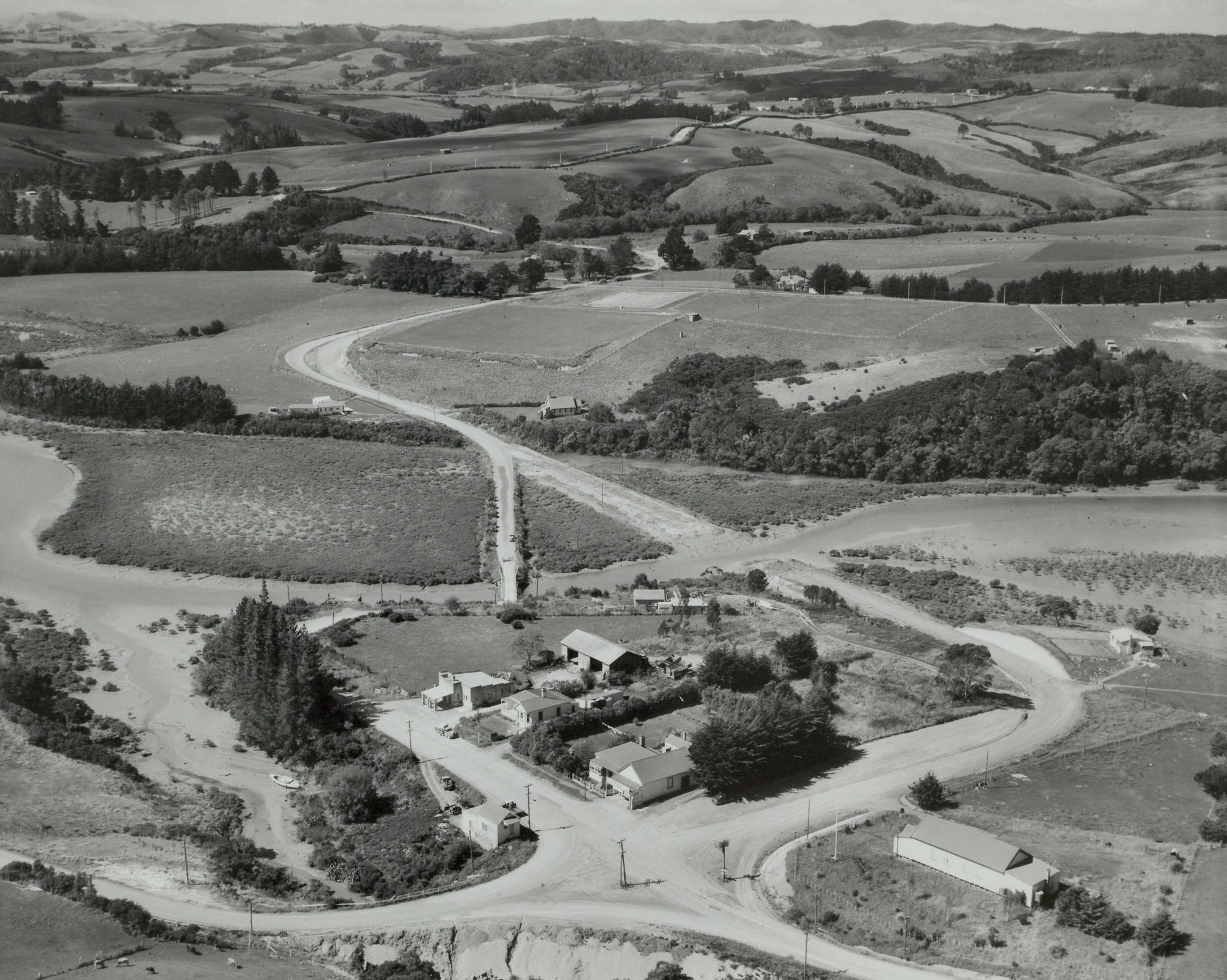
Aerial view of Whitford in 1953

In 1869, L.D. and N.A. Nathan took over Alexander Kennedy's farm and developed an ostrich farm, which provided meat and feathers for the fashion trade from 1869 until the 1920s. Racehorses were trained in Whitford, and in the 1890s the Nathan family equestrian track held large-scale racing events, which people from Auckland attended by ferry. The farming community primarily grew oats, hay, wheat, potatoes for the Auckland market. The town's Granger's brickworks operated from the 1878 until 1920, and in 1900 the Nathan family established a butter factory.

In 1910 the Nathan family subdivided their farm into 21 farms and farmlets, which grew the Whitford community. Whitford Hall was built in 1912, and from 1929 to 1934 during the Great Depression, the town hosted unemployment camps, where people could work at the Whitford Quarry. During World War II, home guard troops dug trenches in the Turanga Creek, and built tank traps around Whitford. In 1957, the Whitford Domain was opened as a sports ground and war memorial.

By the early 2000s, Whitford had developed into a service centre for the surrounding rural area, and as a commuter suburb for city workers. Due to urban growth in surrounding areas like Beachlands and Ormiston, the Whitford village area has seen a substantial increase in traffic flow.

== Demographics ==
Statistics New Zealand describes Whitford as a rural settlement, which covers 0.18 km^{2} (0.069 sq mi) and had an estimated population of 170 as of June 2025, with a population density of 944 people per km^{2}. Whitford is part of the larger Turanga statistical area.

Historical population for Whitford
Year	Pop.	±% p.a.
2006	132	—
2013	87	−5.78%
2018	78	−2.16%
2023	147	+13.51%
The 2006 population is for a larger area of 1.20 km^{2}. Source:

Whitford had a population of 147 in the 2023 New Zealand census, an increase of 69 people (88.5%) since the 2018 census, and an increase of 60 people (69.0%) since the 2013 census. There were 75 males and 72 females in 48 dwellings. 2.0% of people identified as LGBTIQ+. The median age was 52.3 years (compared with 38.1 years nationally). There were 15 people (10.2%) aged under 15 years, 27 (18.4%) aged 15 to 29, 81 (55.1%) aged 30 to 64, and 24 (16.3%) aged 65 or older.

People could identify as more than one ethnicity. The results were 69.4% European (Pākehā); 10.2% Māori; 2.0% Pasifika; 26.5% Asian; and 2.0% Middle Eastern, Latin American and African New Zealanders (MELAA). English was spoken by 93.9%, Māori language by 2.0%, and other languages by 18.4%. The percentage of people born overseas was 40.8, compared with 28.8% nationally.

Religious affiliations were 34.7% Christian, 2.0% Hindu, and 4.1% other religions. People who answered that they had no religion were 49.0%, and 8.2% of people did not answer the census question.

Of those at least 15 years old, 54 (40.9%) people had a bachelor's or higher degree, 51 (38.6%) had a post-high school certificate or diploma, and 21 (15.9%) people exclusively held high school qualifications. The median income was $61,200, compared with $41,500 nationally. 30 people (22.7%) earned over $100,000 compared to 12.1% nationally. The employment status of those at least 15 was that 75 (56.8%) people were employed full-time, 15 (11.4%) were part-time, and 3 (2.3%) were unemployed.

=== Turanga statistical area ===
Turanga statistical area, which also includes Brookby, covers 84.60 km^{2} (32.66 sq mi) and had an estimated population of 3,530 as of June 2025, with a population density of 42 people per km^{2}.

Historical population for Turanga
Year	Pop.	±% p.a.
2006	2,511	—
2013	2,778	+1.45%
2018	2,991	+1.49%
2023	3,333	+2.19%
The 2006 population is for a larger area of 84.96 km^{2}. Source:

Turanga had a population of 3,333 in the 2023 New Zealand census, an increase of 342 people (11.4%) since the 2018 census, and an increase of 555 people (20.0%) since the 2013 census. There were 1,689 males, 1,638 females and 6 people of other genders in 1,029 dwellings. 2.4% of people identified as LGBTIQ+. The median age was 46.0 years (compared with 38.1 years nationally). There were 483 people (14.5%) aged under 15 years, 657 (19.7%) aged 15 to 29, 1,602 (48.1%) aged 30 to 64, and 594 (17.8%) aged 65 or older.

People could identify as more than one ethnicity. The results were 77.0% European (Pākehā); 8.4% Māori; 2.8% Pasifika; 19.2% Asian; 2.1% Middle Eastern, Latin American and African New Zealanders (MELAA); and 2.4% other, which includes people giving their ethnicity as "New Zealander". English was spoken by 95.7%, Māori language by 0.9%, Samoan by 0.6%, and other languages by 20.4%. No language could be spoken by 1.1% (e.g. too young to talk). New Zealand Sign Language was known by 0.2%. The percentage of people born overseas was 31.8, compared with 28.8% nationally.

Religious affiliations were 31.2% Christian, 1.9% Hindu, 1.4% Islam, 0.1% Māori religious beliefs, 0.9% Buddhist, 0.3% New Age, 0.2% Jewish, and 3.2% other religions. People who answered that they had no religion were 54.5%, and 6.4% of people did not answer the census question.

Of those at least 15 years old, 858 (30.1%) people had a bachelor's or higher degree, 1,410 (49.5%) had a post-high school certificate or diploma, and 582 (20.4%) people exclusively held high school qualifications. The median income was $53,400, compared with $41,500 nationally. 654 people (22.9%) earned over $100,000 compared to 12.1% nationally. The employment status of those at least 15 was that 1,491 (52.3%) people were employed full-time, 462 (16.2%) were part-time, and 66 (2.3%) were unemployed.

== Notable places ==
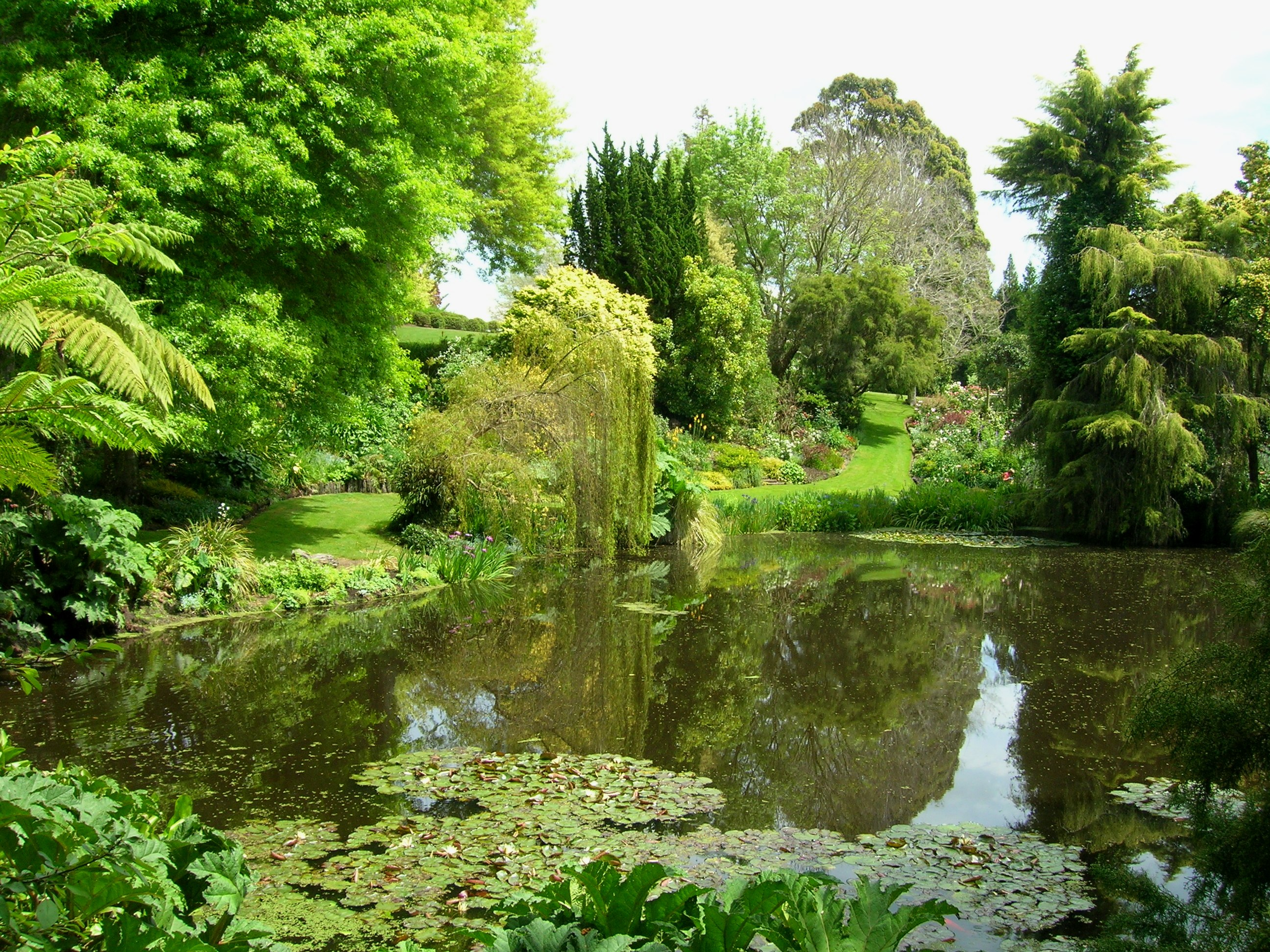
Ayrlies Garden in Whitford

- Ayrlies Garden, one of New Zealand's best-known gardens, is located in Whitford. In the areas surrounding the gardens is a lifestyle estate subdivision expected to be completed in the year 2022.
- Wades Walkway starts in Whitford, and follows the western banks of the Turanga Creek.
- Granger chimney is a remnant of the Grangers Brick and Tile Works and is a land mark for the area.
- William Granger Brick House is a bay villa built for William Granger. Following the closure of the brick works in Whitford the house served as a farm house. The house underwent restoration in the 1970s.

== Local government ==
The first local government in the area was the Turanga Highway District, which was designated in 1865 and began operating in 1866. The district was absorbed into the Manukau County in 1917. Whitford became a part of Manukau City in 1965, and in November 2010, all cities and districts of the Auckland Region were amalgamated into a single body, governed by the Auckland Council.

Whitford is part of the Franklin local board area, who elects members of the Franklin Local Board. Residents of Whitford also elect the Franklin ward councillor, who sits on the Auckland Council.

== Bibliography ==
- La Roche, Alan (2011). Grey's Folly: A History of Howick, Pakuranga, Bucklands-Eastern Beaches, East Tamaki, Whitford, Beachlands and Maraetai. Auckland: Tui Vale Productions. ISBN 978-0-473-18547-3. OCLC 1135039710. Wikidata Q118286377.
