= Mangemangeroa Creek =

River in Auckland Region, New Zealand

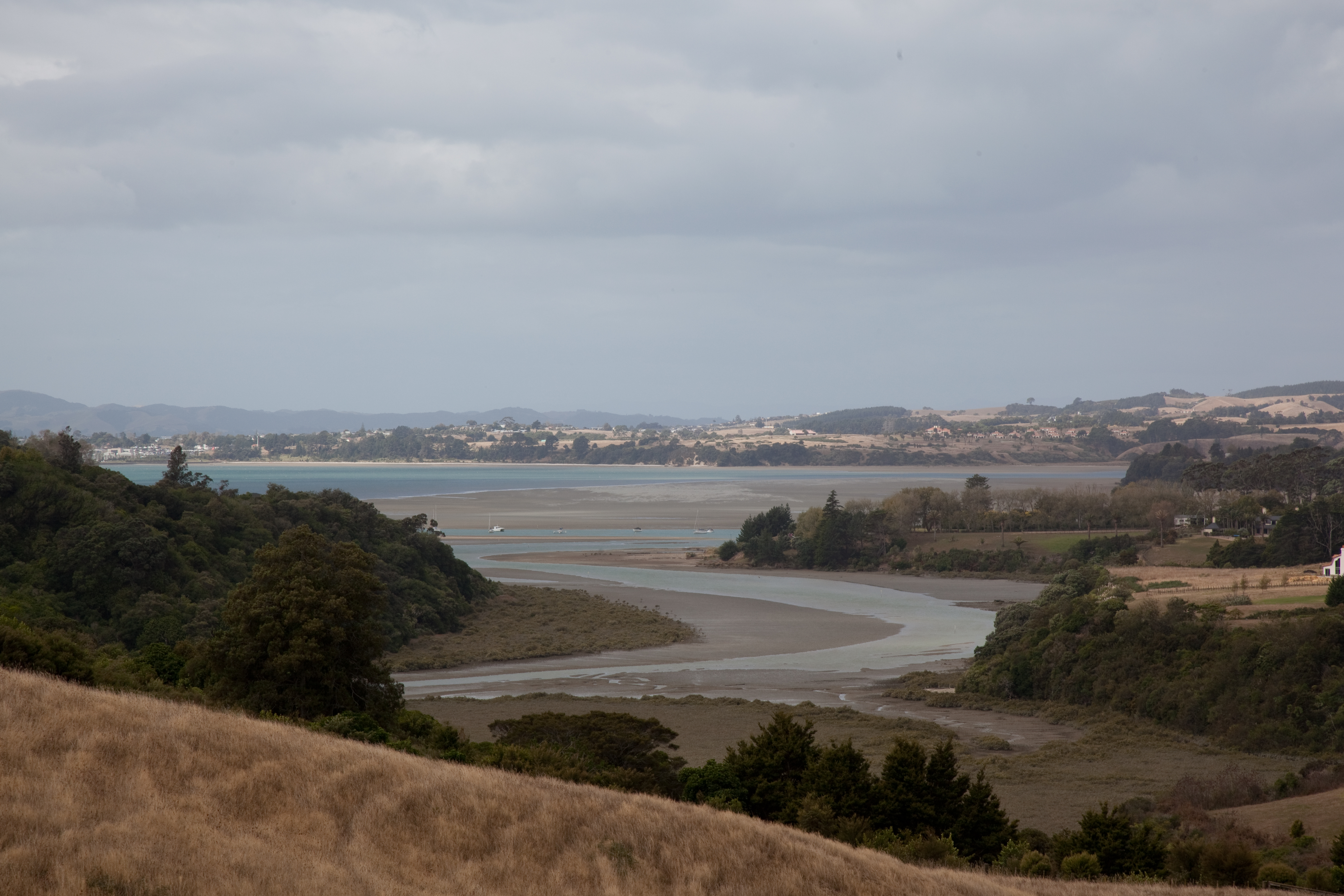
- View of the Mangemangeroa Creek from Mangemangeroa Reserve

- Mouth of the Mangemangeroa Creek Mangemangeroa Creek (New Zealand)
- Route of the Mangemangeroa Creek

Location
- Country: New Zealand
- Region: Auckland Region

Physical characteristics
- Source
  - coordinates: 36.96307°S 174.9432°E
- Mouth: Turanga Creek
  - coordinates: 36.91115°S 174.95275°E

Basin features
- Progression: Mangemangeroa Creek → Turanga Creek → Tamaki Strait → Hauraki Gulf → Pacific Ocean

Mangemangeroa Creek is a tidal estuary and stream in the Auckland Region of New Zealand's North Island. The creek forms a border between metropolitan East Auckland and the rural countryside around Whitford.

== Etymology ==
The name of the creek in Māori means "The Long Valley of the Mangemange Vine", referring to Lygodium articulatum (mangemange). The plant was traditionally used by Ngāi Tai to construct fishing nets, ropes, and as a part of burial practices, and is now rare in the area. The name of the creek had various spellings in English in the 19th Century, including Mungaroa and Maungamaungaroa. The name Mangemangeroa was made official in 1991, after consultation with the Ngāi Tai Trust Board.

== Geography ==
The Mangemangeroa Creek is a drowned valley system. The creek begins to the east of Mission Heights, and flows northwards. As the creek reaches the Waitematā Harbour, it becomes a tidal estuary.

Much of the surrounding land is farmland. Closer to the creek are areas forested with native trees, including tōtara, nīkau, karaka and pūriri. The creek forms the border between the Howick and Franklin local board areas.

== History ==
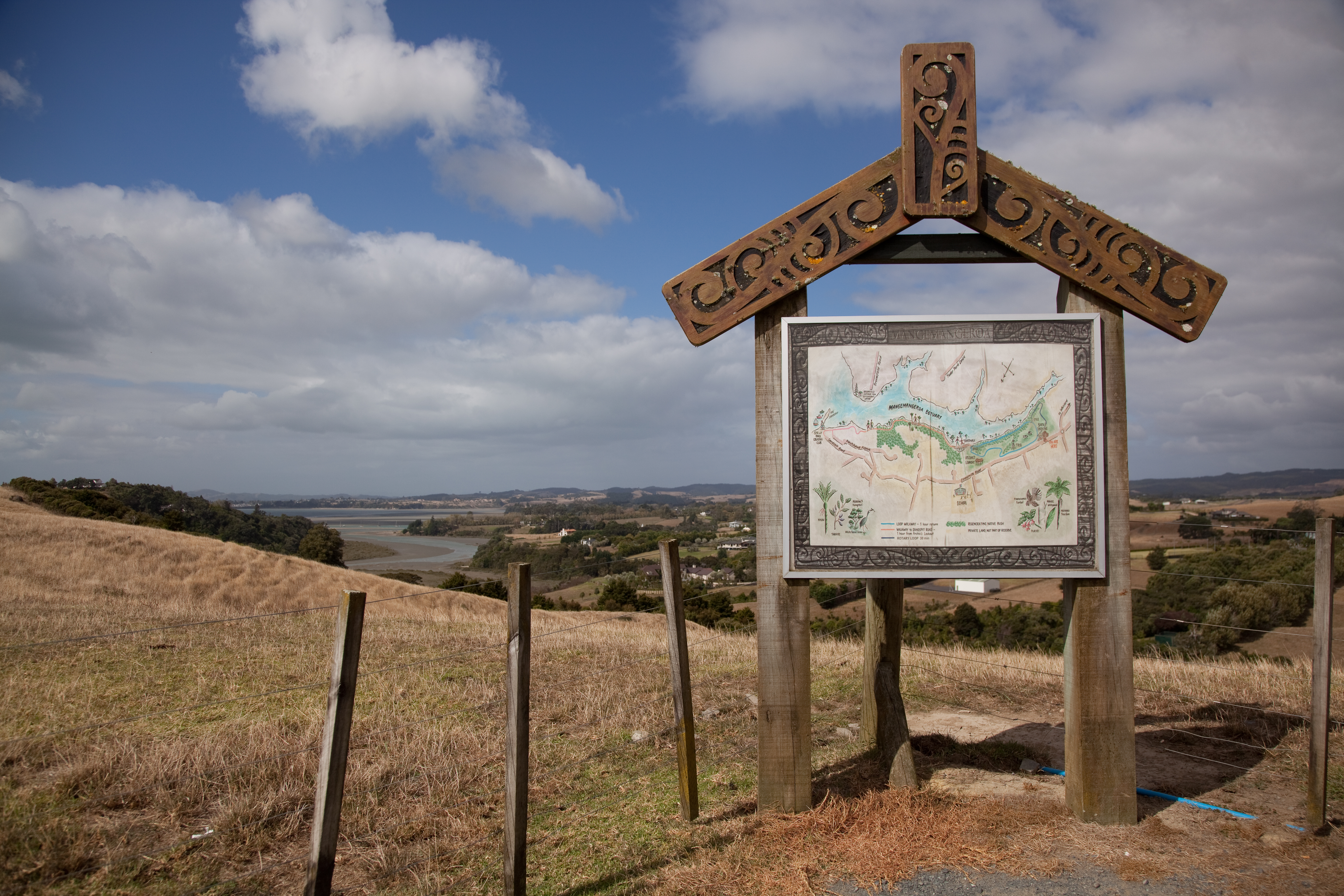
The Mangemangeroa Reserve, on the western banks of the creek

Mangemangeroa was one of the locations visited by the Tainui migratory waka, as the crew explored the eastern bays of the Auckland Region. The area was settled by Ngāi Tai, a people who descended from Tainui, who settled there for the area's seafood resources, including Spiny dogfish (pioke) found in the estuary. Numerous Ngāi Tai and Ngāti Pāoa pā sites, middens and other archaeological sites have been found in the area, most notably Te Mangemangeroa Pā, constructed at the highest point in the valley, to the south of the tidal estuary. Near Broomfields Road is a traditional ara of stepping stones across the creek. Fish traps were constructed by Ngāi Tai in the creek, and some of these were still visible as late as the 1980s.

Early European farmers in the area included the McAuley and Somerville families. The last Ngāi Tai inhabitants left the area in the 1870s. The first wooden bridge across the creek was constructed in the 1860s. Wharfs beside the bridge were used as docking points for ferries, transporting goods and passengers. A new concrete bridge was constructed in April 1935. During World War II, home guard soldiers dug trenches along the creek.

In August 1994, the Manukau City Council purchased land that bordered the creek, at the request of Forest & Bird. This became the Mangemangeroa Reserve, which officially opened on 25 November 2000.

== Amenities ==
A walking track exists on the northern/western banks of the creek, between Shelly Park and the Mangemangeroa Reserve.

== Bibliography ==
- Janssen, Peter (2021), Greater Auckland Walks, New Holland Publishers (published January 2021), OL 34023249W, Wikidata Q118136068
- La Roche, Alan (2011). Grey's Folly: A History of Howick, Pakuranga, Bucklands-Eastern Beaches, East Tamaki, Whitford, Beachlands and Maraetai. Auckland: Tui Vale Productions. ISBN 978-0-473-18547-3. OCLC 1135039710. Wikidata Q118286377.
- La Roche, Alan (2000). The History of the Mangemangeroa Reserve (Report). Manukau City Council.
