= Howick College =

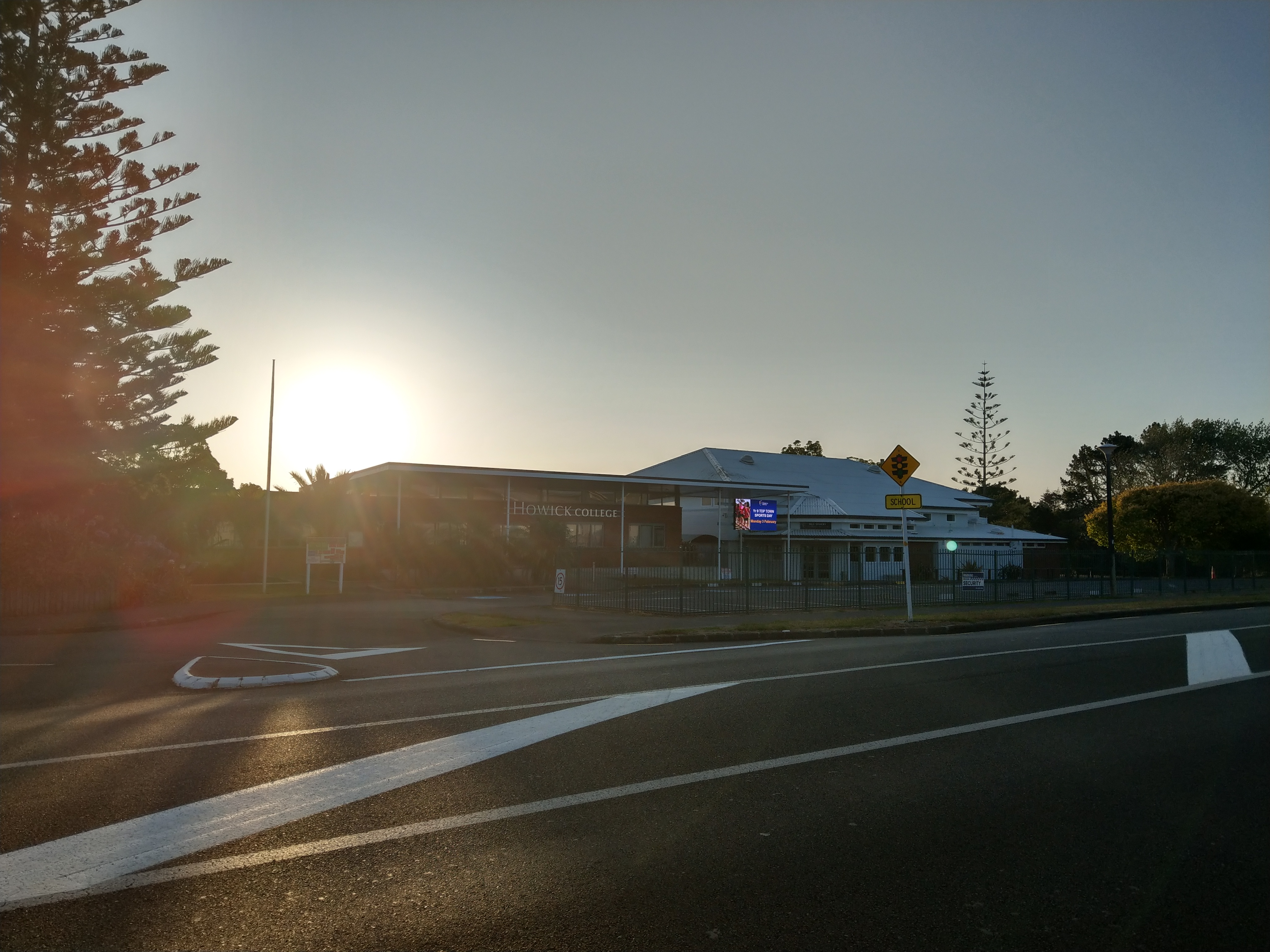

Location
- Sandspit Road; Cockle Bay; Auckland 2014; New Zealand; 36.9071°S 174.9389°E

Information
- Funding type: State
- Motto: Inspiring a community of passionate learners. Whakamanawahia tētehi hapori o ngā ākonga hihiri
- Established: 1974
- Ministry of Education Institution no.: 87
- Principal: Dale Burden
- Years offered: 9–13
- Gender: Co-educational
- Enrolment: 2,218 (July 2026)
- Socio-economic decile: 8Pv
- Website: www.howickcollege.school.nz

Howick College is a state co-educational secondary school located in the eastern Auckland, New Zealand suburb of Cockle Bay. Serving Years 9 to 13, the school has a roll of 2,218 students as of July 2026.

== History ==
Howick College was established in 1974 to serve the Howick area of eastern Auckland. The school was built to the "S68" design, characterised by single-storey classroom blocks with reinforced masonry walls, low-pitched roofs, internal open courtyards and protruding clerestory windows.

The school abolished corporal punishment of students before it even opened, becoming one of the first schools in New Zealand to do so. Corporal punishment was abolished nationwide sixteen years later, in July 1990.

== Enrolment ==
At the August 2012 Education Review Office (ERO) review of the school, Howick College had 1806 students enrolled, including 48 international students. The school roll's gender composition was 52% male and 48% female; and its ethnic composition was 47% European New Zealanders (Pākehā), 14% Other European, 13% Māori, 8% Asian, 5% Pasifika, 6% Indian, and 6% Other.

As of July 2026, Howick College has a roll of 2,218 students, of which 331 (14.9%) identify as Māori.

As of 2026, the school has an Equity Index of 432, placing it amongst schools whose students have below average socioeconomic barriers to achievement (roughly equivalent to deciles 5 and 6 under the former socio-economic decile system).

The school zone encompasses the Somerville, Cockle Bay, Shelly Park, and Pōhutukawa Coast area. It also has a steady out of zone population, with dedicated bus services extending to parts of East and South Auckland.

== House system ==
Howick College has six school houses:

Bacot	Named after John Thomas Watson Bacot, a surgeon who came out to the Howick area with the Fencibles.
Bell	Named after the building Bell House situated at the Howick Colonial Village.
Ingham	Named after the first principal of Howick College, Mr Don Ingham.
Irvine	Named after one of the early English settlers, Captain John Irvine.
MacDonald	Named after Captain Alexander MacDonald, who was voted into the position of Warden of Howick.
Minerva	Named after one of the first ships "Minerva" which transported the first settlers and Fencibles to Howick in 1847.

== Principals ==
- Don Ingham 1974–1991
- Bill Dimery 1992–2009
- Iva Ropati 2010–2022
- Dale Burden 2023–

== Notable alumni ==
- Brent Cooper (born 1960), judoka who won a gold medal at the 1990 Commonwealth Games and placed fifth in the 1988 Olympic Games
- Anthony Gelling (born 1990), Cook Islands Rugby league player who currently plays for Wigan Warriors in the Super League
- Selina Goddard (born 1994), lawn bowls player, Commonwealth Games bronze medallist (2014 Glasgow)
- Christopher Luxon (born 1970), Prime Minister of New Zealand, Member of Parliament for Botany, and former CEO of Air New Zealand
- Tom McCartney (born 1985), rugby union player with the Blues
- Mitchell McClenaghan (born 1986), cricketer with the Blackcaps
- Jessica Mutch McKay, TVNZ political editor
- Katrina Rore (née Grant; born 1987), netball player, captain of Central Pulse and a member of the Silver Ferns
- Dan Williamson (born 2000), Olympic gold medallist in rowing

== Cultural references ==
In the bro'Town première episode "The Weakest Link" (2004), one of the schools competing in the high school quiz challenge is named "Howick Beijing College", a reference to the Howick area's large Chinese migrant population.
