= Ayrlies Garden =

Coordinates: 36.92°S 174.97°E

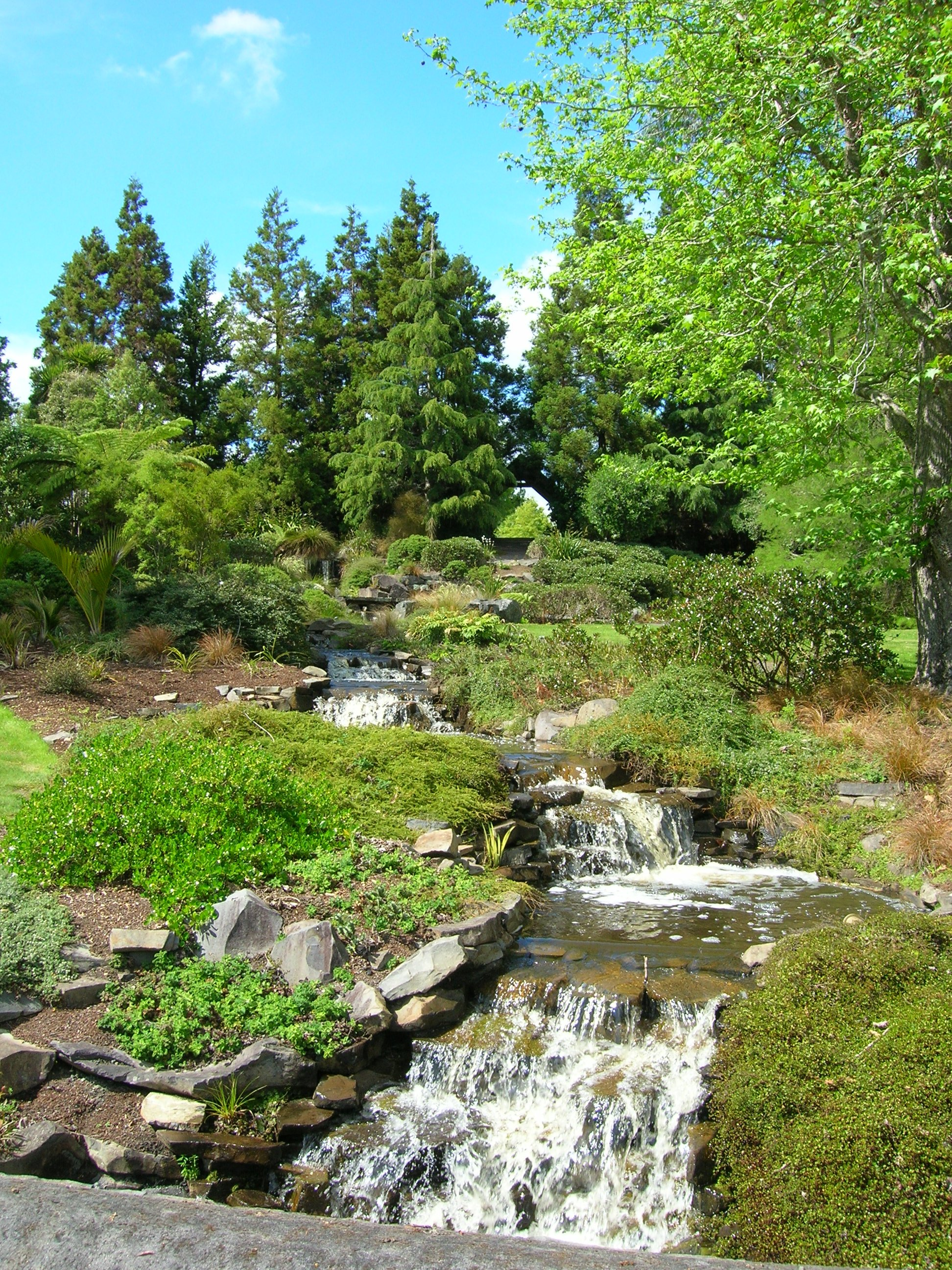
Waterfall

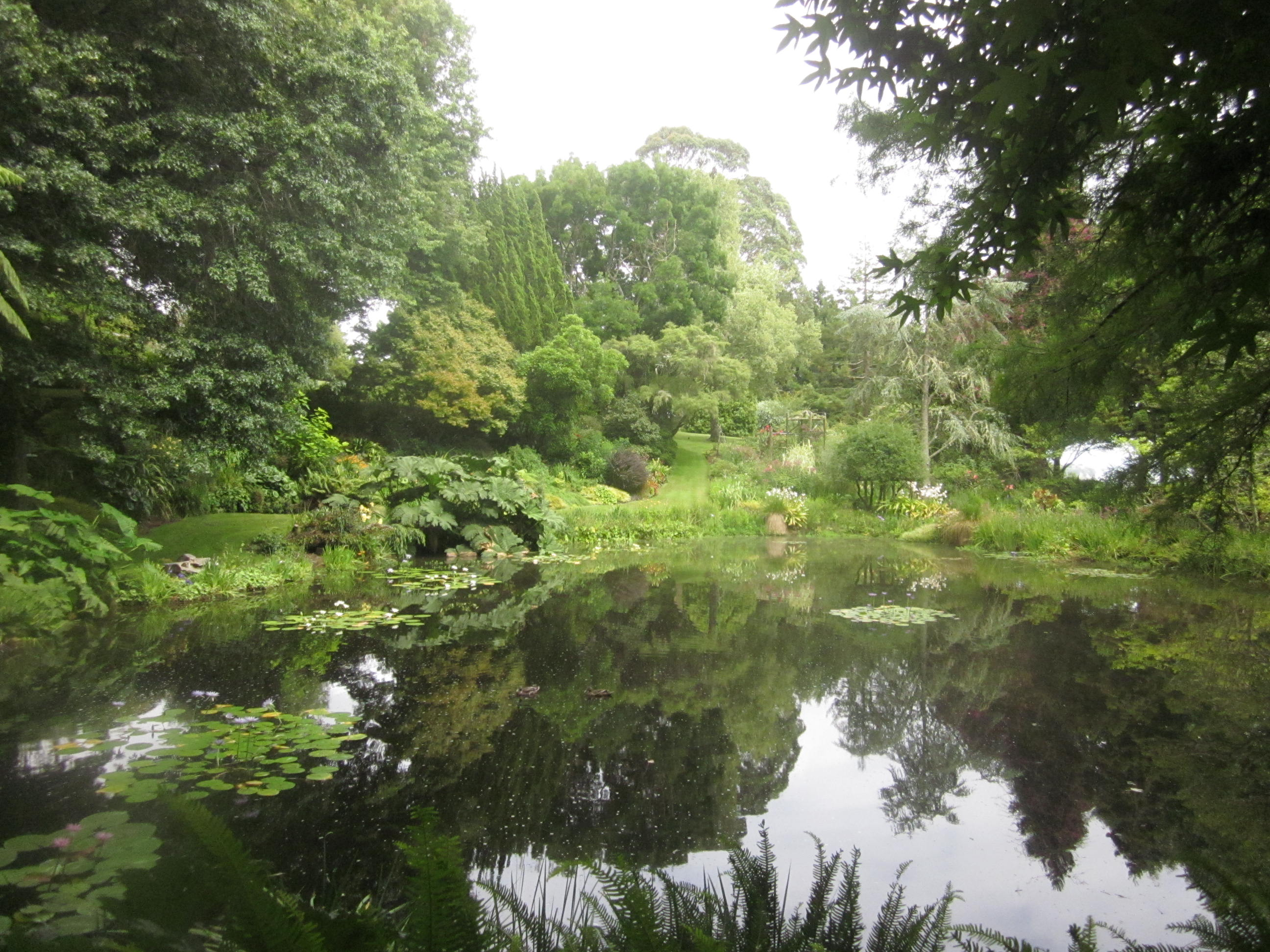
Cypress Pond

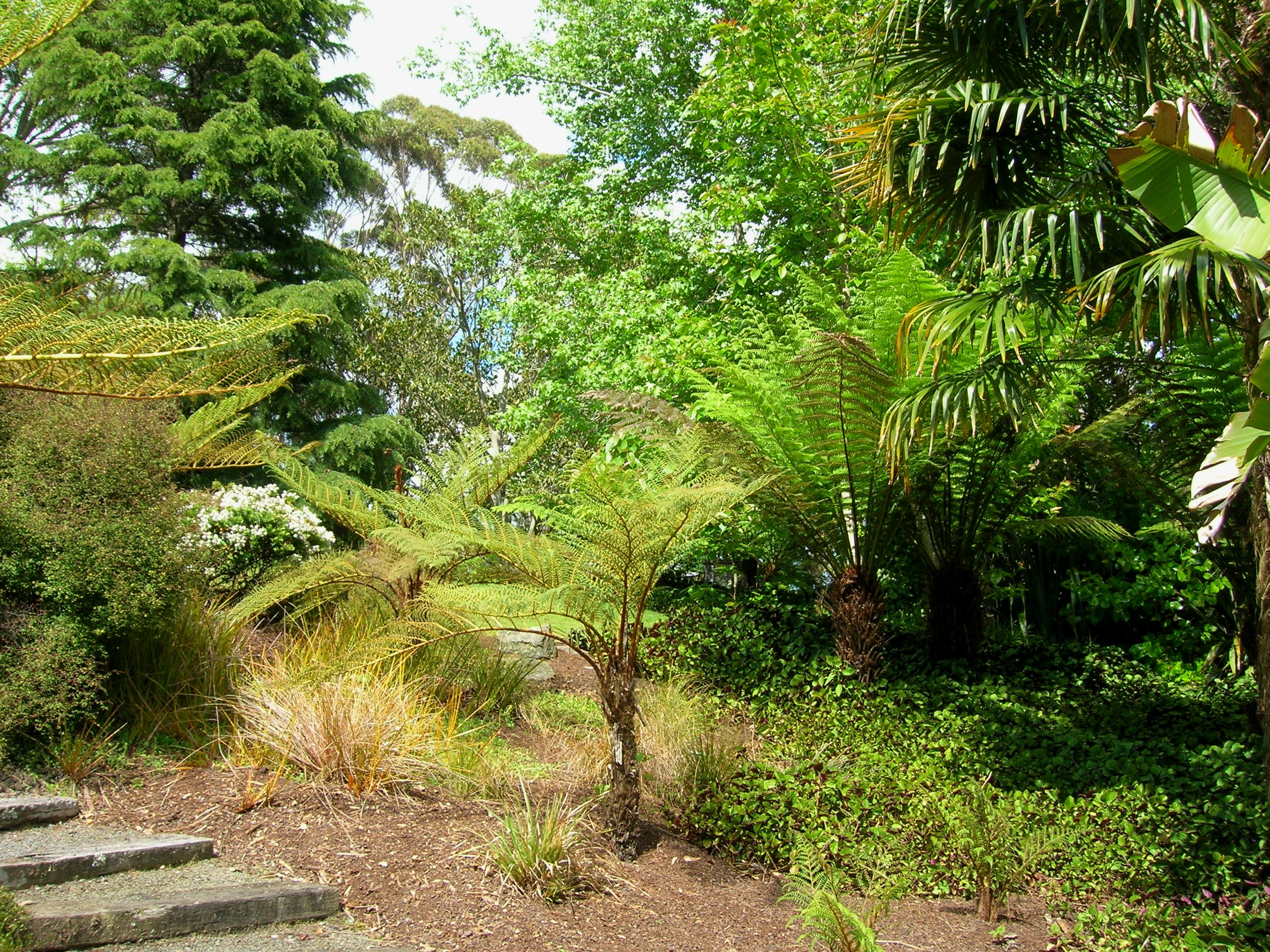
Tree ferns

Ayrlies Garden is a country garden near Whitford, southeast of Auckland on the North Island of New Zealand. It is one of New Zealand's best-known gardens, and has been described as the "quintessential New Zealand garden". The New Zealand Gardens Trust has rated it a six star garden, its highest rating.

The garden now covers some 12 acres (49,000 m^{2}) of rolling terrain, with large lawns, ponds and waterways, and heavily planted informal borders which make strong use of colour, including a "lurid border" of 'hot' colours. Some areas feature roses, clematis and perennials; others contain lush, sub-tropical plants, such as Petrea, Alocasia, bromeliads, vireya rhododendrons and Ficus dammaropsis. It also includes many large trees - mostly liquidambar, swamp cypress and pin oak - which have grown rapidly in the warm and wet climate, with rare frosts and over 50 inches (1.3 m) of rain a year. It contains several structures around the main house, including a small 'sitooterie' - a low gazebo, to sit out in and admire the view. The large site is unified by a consistent planting and use of materials.

The garden was created by Beverly McConnell and her late husband Malcolm, co-founder of New Zealand engineering and construction company McConnell Dowell. It is named after Malcolm McConnell's grandfather's farm in Scotland. The garden began in 1964, when the McConnells moved to the site with their young family, starting with a 3-acre (12,000 m^{2}) coastal site which was previously bare paddock with a heavy clay soil, and expanding to 12 acres (49,000 m^{2}) in 1978, including the addition of three large ponds. From 2000, 35 acres (140,000 m^{2}) of swamp flats below the homestead were transformed into a wetland area with an 8-acre (32,000 m^{2}) lake, linking the garden to the Hauraki Gulf nearby.

The garden is open to the public on weekdays, for a fee.
