= Shelly Park =

- Suburb
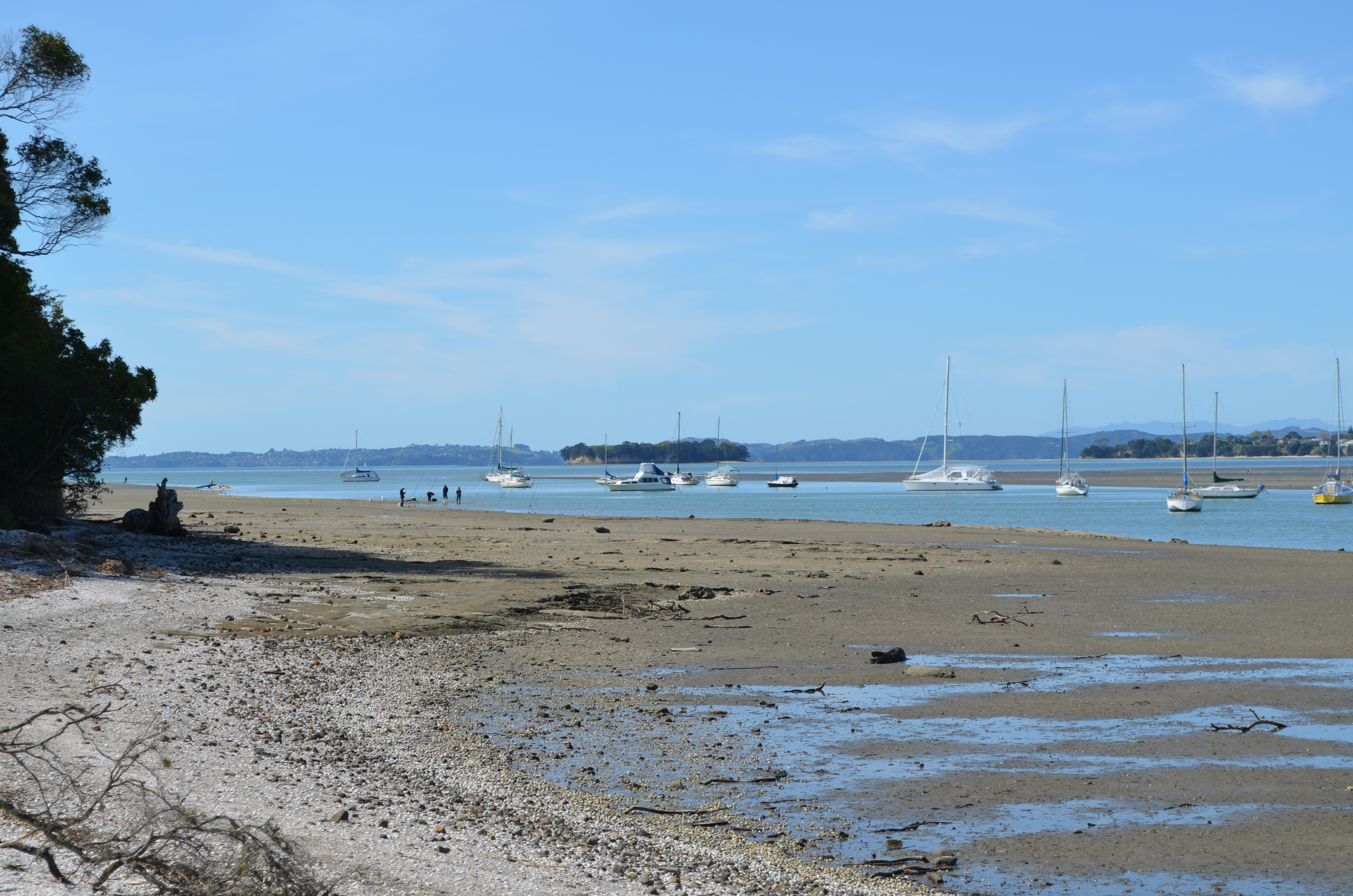
- Shelly Park Beach - View towards Waiheke Island
- Interactive map of Shelly Park
- Coordinates: 36°54′31.28″S 174°57′11.33″E
- Country: New Zealand
- City: Auckland
- Local authority: Auckland Council
- Electoral ward: Howick ward
- Local board: Howick Local Board

Area
  - Land: 123 ha (300 acres)

Population (June 2025)
  - Total: 2,970
  - Density: 2,410/km^{2} (6,250/sq mi)

Howick (1.9 km)	Cockle Bay (760 m)	(Hauraki Gulf)
Botany Downs (2.1 km)	Shelly Park	(Hauraki Gulf)
Somerville	(Mangemangeroa Creek)	(Hauraki Gulf)

Shelly Park is a suburb of East Auckland, in northern New Zealand. The suburb is in the Howick ward, one of thirteen electoral divisions of the Auckland Council. It is named after the beach of the same name.

== Geography ==
Shelly Park is located on the eastern edges of metropolitan East Auckland, along the Hauraki Gulf coast. Shelly Park Beach is located to the south of the suburb, and is found along the shores of the estuarial Mangemangeroa Creek.

== History ==
The Shelly Park area is part of the rohe of Ngāi Tai ki Tāmaki, who descend from the crew of the Tainui migratory waka, who visited the area around the year 1300. Many Ngāi Tai and Ngāti Pāoa pā sites, middens and other archaeological sites can be found in the Mangemangeroa Valley, which was known for Spiny dogfish pioke found in the estuary. The area was cultivated by Ngāi Tai, and protected by the Tūwakamana Pā at Cockle Bay.

In 1836, English Missionary William Thomas Fairburn brokered a land sale between Tāmaki Māori chiefs covering the majority of modern-day South Auckland, East Auckland and the Pōhutukawa Coast. The sale was envisioned as a way to end hostilities in the area, but it is unclear what the chiefs understood or consented to. Māori continued to live in the area, unchanged by this sale.

In 1843, early settlers George and William Trice arrived at Shelly Park. Moananui, chief of the Ngāi Tai at Shelly Park, suggested that the Trices buy land across the creek, near Clifton Road. In 1847, Howick township was established as a defensive outpost for Auckland, by fencibles (retired British Army soldiers) and their families. Early settlers in the area shot the kūaka and huahou found in the estuary, and carpenter Lauchlan McInnes harvested the forest behind Shelly Park Beach, which then was known as McInnes' Bush. In 1854 when Fairburn's purchase was investigated by the New Zealand Land Commission, a Ngāi Tai reserve was created around the Wairoa River and Umupuia areas, and as a part of the agreement, members of Ngāi Tai agreed to leave their traditional settlements to the west, near Howick.

The Shelly Park Beach sandspit was a popular point for ferries to disembark passengers headed for Howick, and a wharf was constructed at the end of the sandspit around the year 1880.

In December 1923, Shelly Park was subdivided into 42 sections, primarily sold as holiday baches. A holidaying community developed around Shelly Beach, and was active until the 1970s, when the area transitioned into a suburb of Auckland.

== Demographics ==
Shelly Park covers 1.23 km^{2} (0.47 sq mi) and had an estimated population of 2,970 as of June 2025, with a population density of 2,415 people per km^{2}.

Historical population
Year	Pop.	±% p.a.
2006	2,760	—
2013	2,811	+0.26%
2018	2,850	+0.28%
2023	2,850	+0.00%

Shelly Park had a population of 2,850 in the 2023 New Zealand census, unchanged since the 2018 census, and an increase of 39 people (1.4%) since the 2013 census. There were 1,392 males, 1,446 females and 12 people of other genders in 939 dwellings. 3.1% of people identified as LGBTIQ+. The median age was 41.0 years (compared with 38.1 years nationally). There were 534 people (18.7%) aged under 15 years, 531 (18.6%) aged 15 to 29, 1,377 (48.3%) aged 30 to 64, and 405 (14.2%) aged 65 or older.

People could identify as more than one ethnicity. The results were 74.3% European (Pākehā); 6.6% Māori; 3.2% Pasifika; 21.3% Asian; 1.7% Middle Eastern, Latin American and African New Zealanders (MELAA); and 3.8% other, which includes people giving their ethnicity as "New Zealander". English was spoken by 95.3%, Māori language by 0.5%, Samoan by 0.6%, and other languages by 23.6%. No language could be spoken by 1.2% (e.g. too young to talk). New Zealand Sign Language was known by 0.4%. The percentage of people born overseas was 43.4, compared with 28.8% nationally.

Religious affiliations were 36.2% Christian, 1.5% Hindu, 0.9% Islam, 0.1% Māori religious beliefs, 1.2% Buddhist, 0.2% New Age, 0.3% Jewish, and 1.7% other religions. People who answered that they had no religion were 51.5%, and 6.6% of people did not answer the census question.

Of those at least 15 years old, 762 (32.9%) people had a bachelor's or higher degree, 1,134 (49.0%) had a post-high school certificate or diploma, and 420 (18.1%) people exclusively held high school qualifications. The median income was $52,400, compared with $41,500 nationally. 489 people (21.1%) earned over $100,000 compared to 12.1% nationally. The employment status of those at least 15 was that 1,305 (56.3%) people were employed full-time, 327 (14.1%) were part-time, and 39 (1.7%) were unemployed.

== Education ==
Shelly Park Primary School is a contributing primary school (Year 1-6) with a roll of 396, which opened in June 1979.

== Amenities ==
Shelly Park Beach is located in the suburb, and is known for its sandspit to the east. Shelly Park Cruising Club (SPCC) is a yacht club that formed in 1959. The club offers dry docking facilities and the beach is an access point to the estuary where boats are moored.

The beach is also one end of a nature walkway, Mangemangeroa Shelly Park Beach Path, which runs from there to Somerville Road.

== Gallery ==
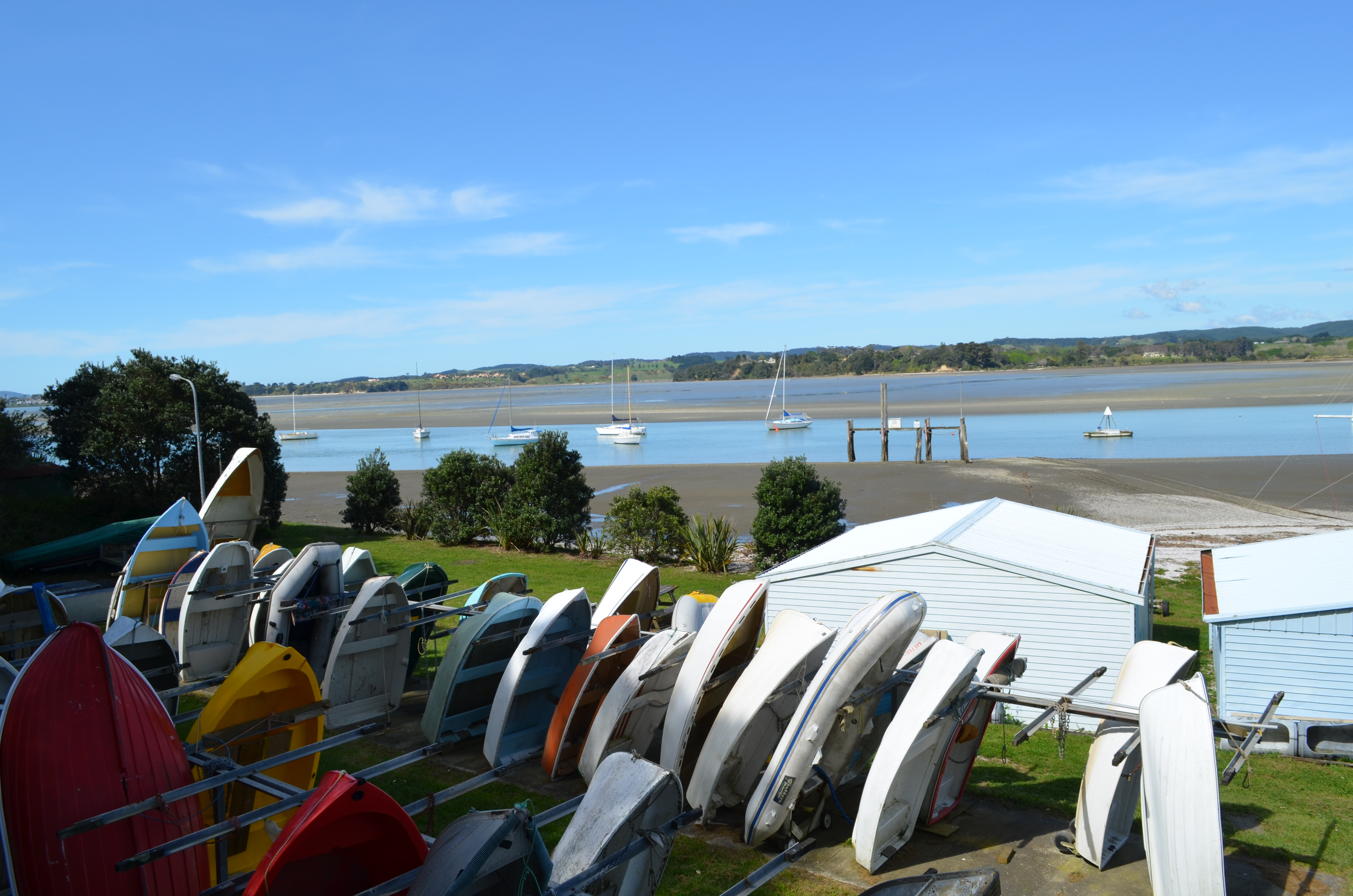
Shelly Park Beach & Yacht Club

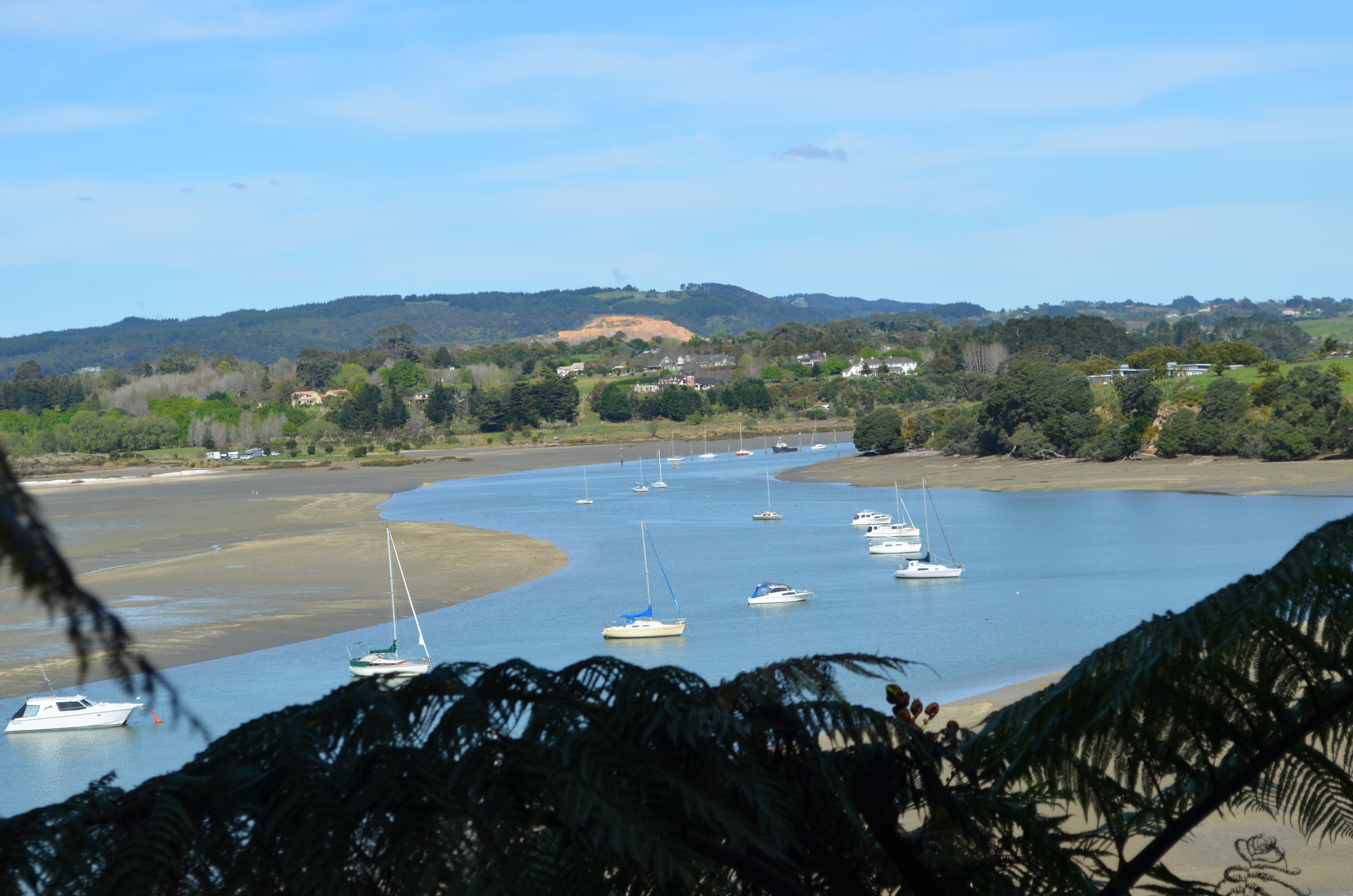
Shelly Park Estuary

== Bibliography ==
- La Roche, Alan (2011). Grey's Folly: A History of Howick, Pakuranga, Bucklands-Eastern Beaches, East Tamaki, Whitford, Beachlands and Maraetai. Auckland: Tui Vale Productions. ISBN 978-0-473-18547-3. OCLC 1135039710. Wikidata Q118286377.
