= New Holland Publishers =

Australian publishing firm

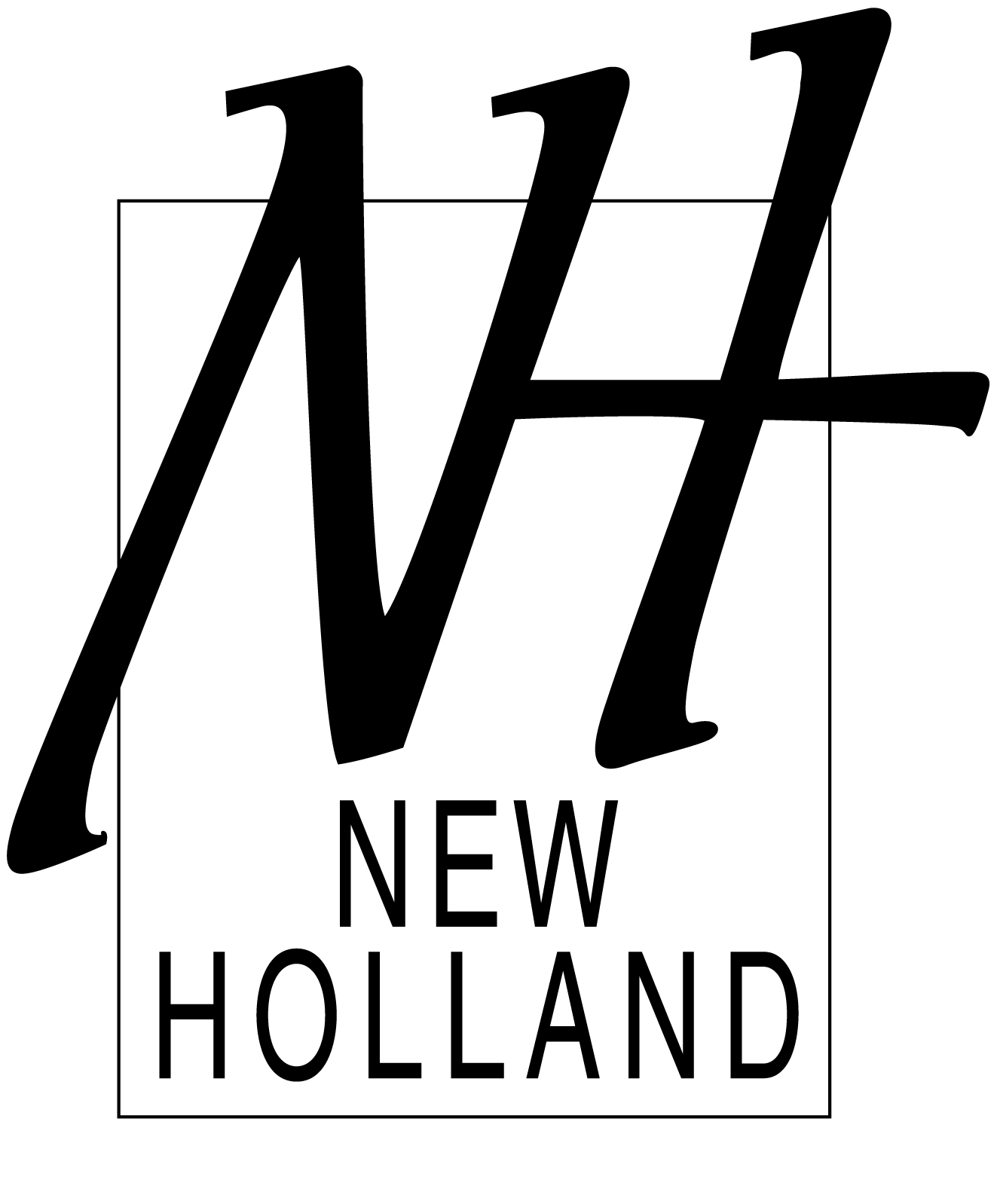
- Status: Active
- Founded: 1955
- Country of origin: Australia, & New Zealand
- Headquarters location: Australia
- Distribution: Harper Entertainment Distribution Services (Australia & New Zealand)
- Key people: Fiona Schultz (MD)
- Publication types: Books
- Nonfiction topics: Lifestyle, natural history, travel
- Owner: New Holland Publishers (AUS) Pty Ltd
- Official website: newhollandpublishers.com

New Holland Publishers is an Australian based international publisher of non-fiction books, founded in 1955. It is a privately held company, with offices in Australia.

== History ==
The publishing firm was established as "Holland Press" on 20 June 1955 in Southwark, London, England, and renamed to New Holland Publishers in 1988. It currently operates offices in Wahroonga, New South Wales, Australia. The company went through a significant round of redundancies from 2008 to 2011. In 2013 the company sold US publishing rights to over 200 titles to Bloomsbury; and in 2014 over 1,400 titles to Fox Chapel Publishing of East Petersburg, Pennsylvania. In 2018 The UK branch of New Holland Publishers closed its offices and the original 1955 business NEW HOLLAND PUBLISHERS (UK) LIMITED was dissolved on 21 August 2018 In 2022 New Holland publishers; New Zealand branch was purchased by Upstart Press Limited
