= William Thomas Fairburn =

Englih missionary (1795–1859)

- Born: 3 September 1795; Deptford, England
- Died: 10 January 1859 (aged 63); Auckland, New Zealand
- Occupation: Missionary
- Spouse(s): Sarah Tuckwell (died 1843); Elizabeth Newman (died 1847)

William Thomas Fairburn (3 September 1795 – 10 January 1859) was a carpenter and a lay preacher or catechist for the Church Missionary Society (C.M.S.) in the early days of European settlement of New Zealand.

== Early life ==
He was born in England in 1795, and married Sarah Tuckwell on 12 April 1819 in St Johns Church of England, Parramatta, Sydney, NSW Australia.

== Missionary work in New Zealand ==
He and Sarah sailed on the brig General Gates to New Zealand on 27 July 1819, accompanying Samuel Marsden on his second visit to New Zealand.

In 1823, Marsden sailed on the Brampton on his fourth visit, bringing with him Henry Williams and his wife Marianne as well as Richard Davis and William Fairburn, and their respective families.

In October 1833 he went with John Alexander Wilson, James Preece and John Morgan to establish a mission station at Puriri on the Waihou River.

In 1835, Te Waharoa, the leader of the Ngāti Hauā iwi (Māori tribe) of the Matamata region, lead his warriors against neighbouring tribes to avenge the death of a relative, with the fighting, which continued into 1836, extended from Rotorua to Tauranga.

After a house at the Rotorua mission was ransacked, both the Rotorua mission and the Matamata mission was not considered to be safe and the wives of the missionaries were escorted to Puriri and Tauranga. Fairburn and the other CMS missionaries attempted to bring peace to the belligerents. In late March 1836, a war party led by Te Waharoa arrived at Tauranga and the missionary families boarded the Columbine as a safety precaution on 31 March.

In 1840 he was at the mission station at Maraetai, and was at the Puriri Mission in 1842.

== The "Fairburn purchase" ==
Extent of the Fairburn Purchase. Granted to William Fairburn Extent of the "Fairburn purchase"

Between 1836 and 1839 Fairburn began moves to establish a mission station at Maraetai while attempting to purchase a vast tract of land from various iwi of Auckland. Brokered as "an act of Christian peacemaking" between warring tribes on the Auckland isthmus, Fairburn obtained "signatures" to the deed of purchase from over 30 rangatira (chiefs); few, if any of whom could read or write. With the agreement of local Maori at a meeting at Puneke on the Tamaki River on 22 January 1836, he purchased the entire Bucklands Beach, Howick and Pakuranga area of 40,000 acres (160 km^{2}). The price paid to 3 local chiefs was 10 blankets, 24 axes, 26 hoes, 14 spades, $80, 1,900 lb (860 kg) of tobacco, 24 cobs and 12 plane irons. The value of the goods was about 907 pounds and 17 shillings and 6 pence. The 3 hapu who sold the land were Ngatitawaki, Urikaraka and Matekiwaho. The principal chiefs who signed the sale were Herua, Te Waru, Hauauru and Te Tara. The Treaty of Waitangi was signed at Karaka Bay on the Tamaki River opposite Big Bucklands Beach in 1840 by Capt Hobson and Ngati Paoa. After the treaty signing the Fairburn purchase was examined by the government, who determined that Fairburn could keep 1/7 of the land, with the rest being claimed by the government, who later sold it on in smaller blocks.

Fairburn originally estimated the total area to contain 40,000 acres (160 km^{2}), but it was later surveyed as being around 83,000. When the purchase came under scrutiny from the CMS, in 1837 Fairburn signed a deed promising to return one third of the land to the original inhabitants (a transaction which never took place), and unsuccessfully attempted to offer another third to the Church.

Following the 1840 Treaty of Waitangi which established British sovereignty over New Zealand, Fairburn came under investigation from the new government's Land Claims Commission. Following a protracted investigation (during which time Fairburn resigned from the mission), in 1848 the Commission disallowed Fairburn's original claim, awarding him instead a much smaller grant of just under 5,500 acres (22 km^{2}).

The remainder of the land, including Ōtara, was retained by the Crown as "surplus land" to be onsold to European settlers. Following the protests of Hori Te Whetuki on behalf of Ngāi Tai, in 1854 the Commission granted a "Native Reservation" of just over 6,000 acres (24 km^{2}) at Duders Beach (Umupuia) to "the chiefs of the Ngatitai" and paid them £500 compensation, on the condition that they sign an agreement to vacate all other lands within the original purchase boundaries, and order all other iwi to do the same.

== Family ==
The Fairburns had five children. Their daughter Elizabeth married William Colenso. Their son Edwin was a prominent surveyor. Sarah Fairburn died in September 1843. He married Elizabeth Newman, the daughter of Joseph Newman of Willoughby, Lincolnshire. The auctioneer Joseph Newman was her brother. His second wife died in childbirth in June 1847.
