= Duders Beach =

Beach near Maraetai, New Zealand

Coordinates: 36.9042°S 175.0695°E

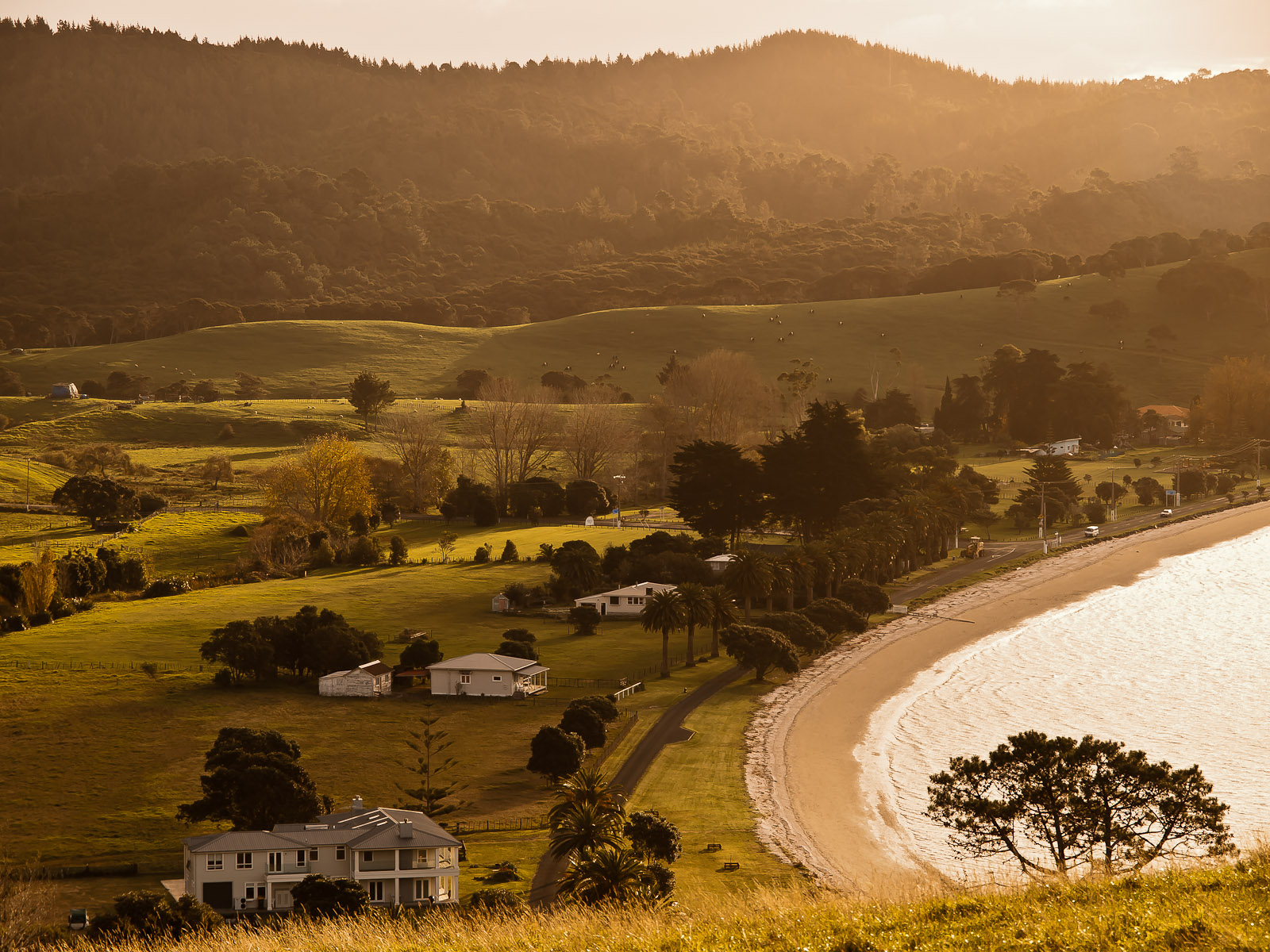
Duders Beach, late afternoon, view from Duder Regional Park

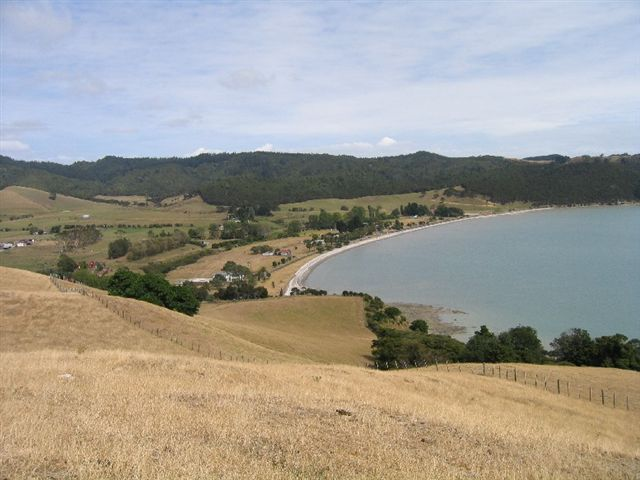
View from Duder Regional Park across Duders Beach

Duders Beach, also known as Umupuia Beach, is located in the Auckland Region of New Zealand, to the east of Maraetai on the North Road from Clevedon. Duder Regional Park is on the headland immediately to the east.

The land was purchased in 1866 from the original Maori owners Ngāi Tai by Thomas Duder. Today the beach is divided between the "public beach" and a private beach owned above the high tide mark by his descendants.

Duders Beach has traditionally been a good source of seafood, notably shellfish, but stocks have been depleted in recent times.
