= Styaks Swamp =

Coordinates: 36.936138°S 174.900155°E

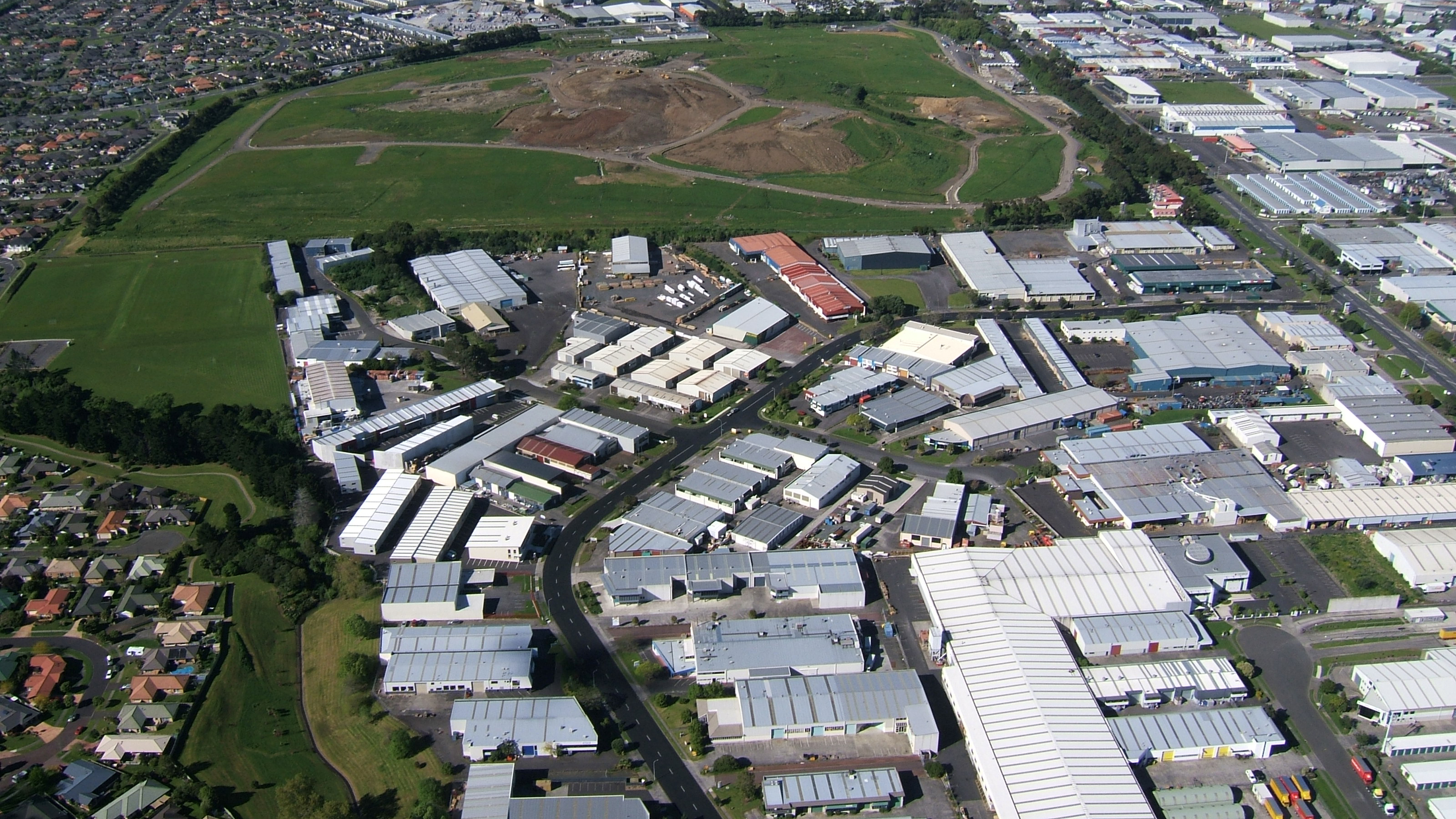
The former site of Styaks Swamp in East Tāmaki, which has since been developed as an industrial area

Styaks Swamp is one of the volcanoes in the Auckland volcanic field, found in the suburb of East Tāmaki.

== Geology ==
It erupted approximately 19,600 years ago and formed a 250m wide explosion crater with a surrounding low-profile tuff ring of approximately 400m diameter from crest-to-crest. It is located north of Green Hill.

Styaks Swamp is one of a line of four volcanoes that lie in close proximity. Ash from Styaks Swamp overlapping lava flows from Green Hill suggests that volcanic activity moved from south to north; with Hampton Park being the youngest, followed by Ōtara Hill, Green Hill, then Styaks Swamp the oldest. The lava flows of all four spread westwards.

A lava flow from the volcano forms the southern boundary of the Pakuranga Creek, around Burswood Reserve.

== History ==
During the early colonial era, the volcano was a park of John Styak's farm. The crater once contained a swamp but is now covered by industrial development.

== See also ==
- City of Volcanoes: A geology of Auckland - Searle, Ernest J.; revised by Mayhill, R.D.; Longman Paul, 1981. First published 1964. ISBN 0-582-71784-1.
- Volcanoes of Auckland: A Field Guide. Hayward, B.W.; Auckland University Press, 2019, 335 pp. ISBN 0-582-71784-1.
