= Bessy Bell and Mary Gray =

Traditional song

Bessy Bell and Mary Gray (Roud 237, Child 201) is an English-language folk song. The two titular characters sought refuge from the plague in 1645 in a remote spot away from habitation. The story has been much embellished in a poem and ballad that were written many years later.

According to the ballad, Bessy and Mary were daughters of two Perthshire gentlemen, who in 1666 built themselves a bower to avoid catching a devastating plague. The girls were supplied with food by a lad in love with both of them; the lad caught the plague and gave it to them, and all three sickened and died.

The supposed site of Bessie Bell and Mary Gray's bower, and of their grave, is recorded in a c.1860 Ordnance Survey name book, with the following comments:

This grave is situated on the north side of the Almond, and about half a mile West of Lynedoch house. Bessie Bell, according to the common tradition, was daughter to the Laird of Kinvaid, and Mary Gray, of the Laird of Lynedoch. Mutually attached in strong and tender friendship they lived together at Lynedoch, when the plague broke out in 1645; and to avoid it they retired to a romantic spot called Burn Brae, and there lived in a Bower in complete seclusion. A young gentleman of Perth, an admirer of both, visited them for the purpose, it is said, of supplying them with food, but unhappily he communicated to them the very pestilence from which they had fled. Falling victims to the disease, they were, according to custom, refused sepulture, in the ordinary burying-ground, and slept together as they had latterly lived

== Location ==
The site of bower and grave is on the banks of the River Almond and east of Burn Brae. (56.4436°N 3.5789°W)

Two similar hills near Omagh, County Tyrone (Northern Ireland) were named after Bessy Bell and Mary Gray by Scottish immigrants who went to Ireland to make their passage to America. Sliabh Troim ('mountain of elder') is the original Irish name of Bessy Bell, also recorded as Sliab Toad. There also exist twin hills in Staunton, Virginia which were named after the girls by Scottish immigrants. Two adjacent volcanic cones in the Auckland volcanic field, New Zealand, (Otara Hill and Green Hill) were referred to by 19th-century European settlers as Bessy Bell and Mary Gray (See 1859 map).

== Recordings ==
- Ewan MacColl on "The English & Scottish Popular Ballads Vol 2" (1956)
- Martin Carthy on "Shearwater" (1972)
- Lal and Norma Waterson on "A True Hearted Girl" (1977)
- Steeleye Span on "Tempted and Tried" (1989)
- Steeleye Span on "The 35th Anniversary World Tour 2004" DVD (2005)
- Maddy Prior on "Ballads and Candles" (2000) (as "Betsy Bell and Mary Gray)
- Cherish the Ladies on "Woman of the House" (2005) (as "Betsy Belle and Mary Gray")
- The Foxglove Trio on "Like Diamond Glances" (2013) (as "Betsy Bell and Mary Grey")
