= McLennan Hills =

Volcano in New Zealand

Coordinates: 36.929208°S 174.846468°E

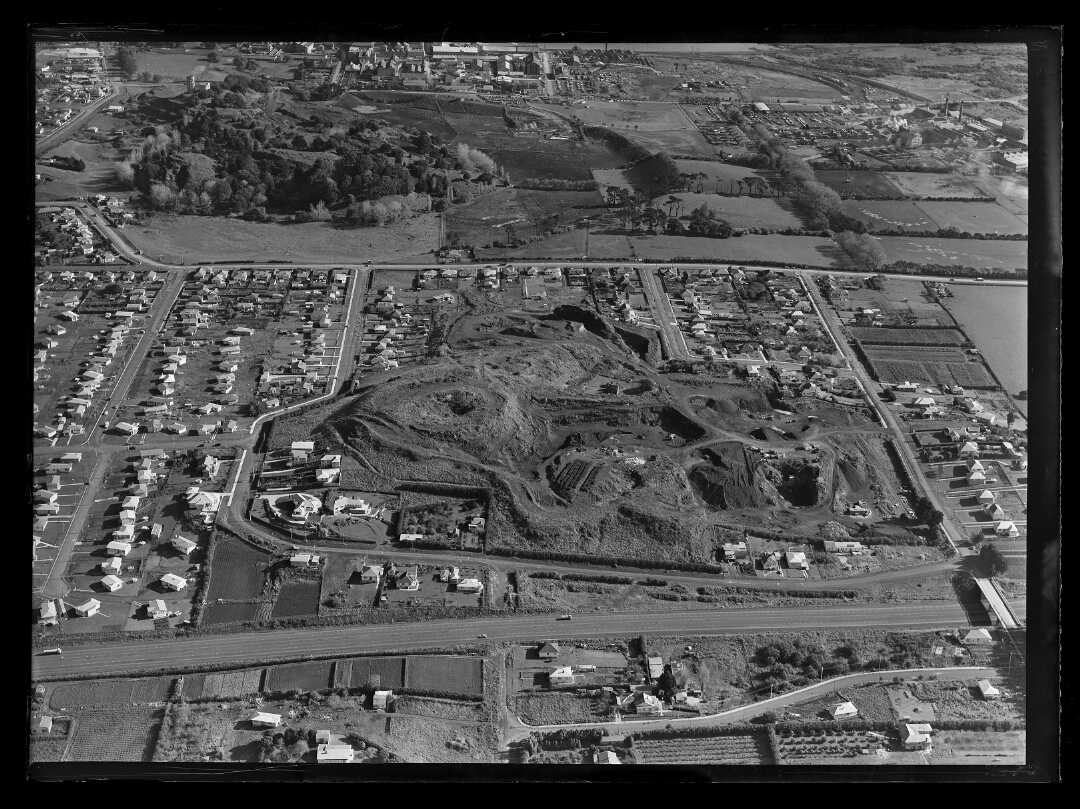
View of the partially quarried McLennan Hills in 1958.

McLennan Hills (also Te Aponga o Tainui) is one of the volcanoes in the Auckland volcanic field. It was a group of cratered scoria mounds up to 45 m high, before it was quarried away. A 1940 aerial photo (in Searle's book) shows a crater around 100 m wide, one around 50 m wide, and 2 or 3 smaller craters. McLennan Hills, alongside neighbouring Ōtāhuhu / Mount Richmond, were the sites of fortified pā in pre-European times, important due to their location between the Waitematā Harbour/Tāmaki River and the Manukau Harbour. Since the European settlement of Auckland, the scoria cone was quarried. The former quarry site was used for greenhouses before being redeveloped for housing.
