= Rangitoto (disambiguation) =

Rangitoto Island is a volcanic island in the Hauraki Gulf.

Rangitoto may also refer to:

- Rangitoto College, a secondary school
- Little Rangitoto, a volcano in central Auckland
- Rangitoto, Waikato, a rural village
  - Rangitoto School, a primary school in Rangitoto, Waikato
- Rangitoto Range, a mountain range in Pureora Forest Park
- Rangitoto Islands, a group of islands in the Marlborough Sounds
- D'Urville Island (also known as Rangitoto ki te Tonga), an island in the Marlborough Sounds
- Rangitoto, a ship of the New Zealand Shipping Company (1949 to 1976)
