= Guy's Homestead =

Historic building in Auckland, New Zealand

Coordinates: 36.92965°S 174.90573°E

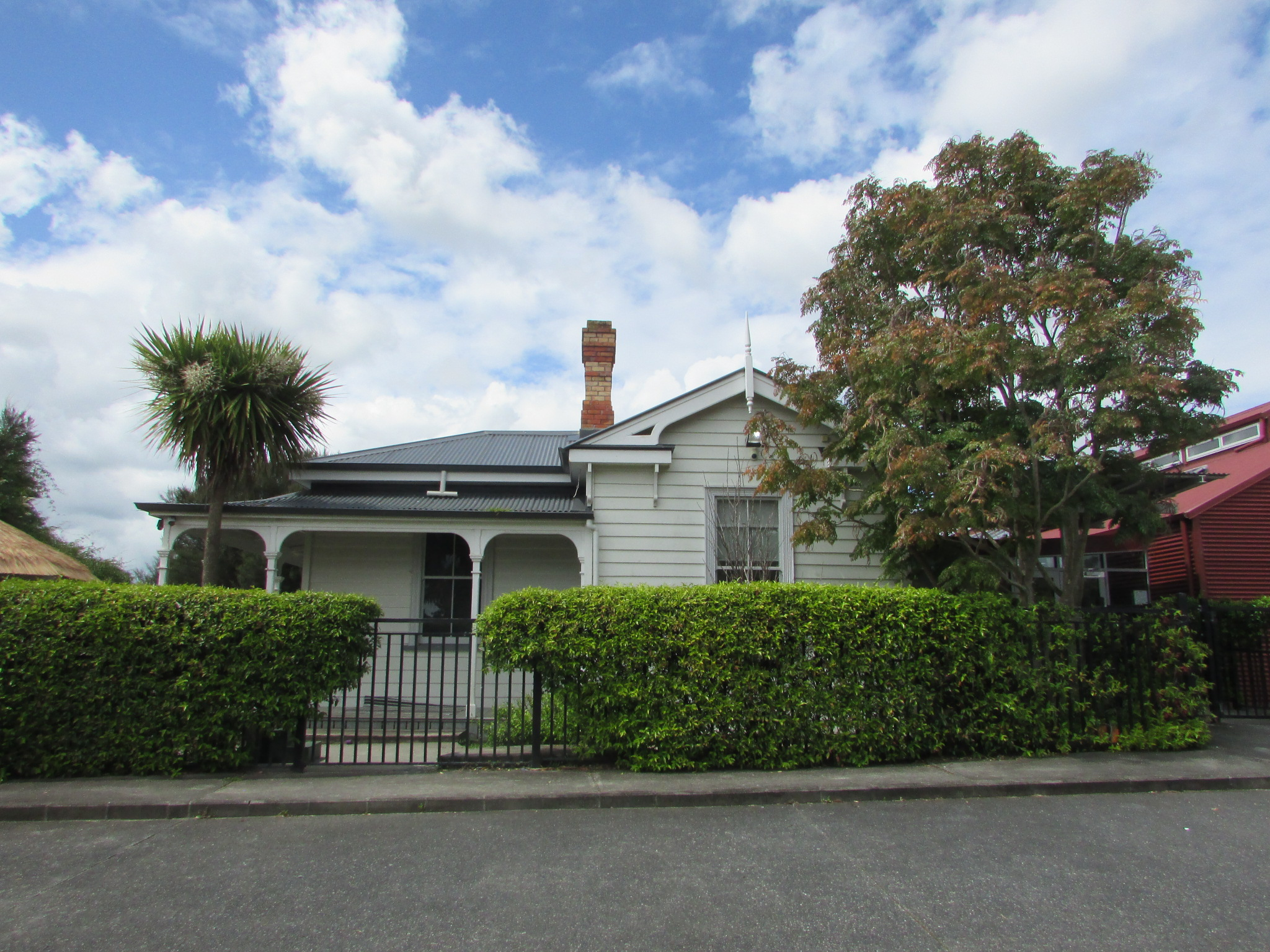
- Guy's Homestead after restoration
- Interactive map of the Guy's Homestead area
- Alternative names: Saidia

General information
- Location: Guys Road, Pakuranga, Auckland, New Zealand
- Named for: Andrew Guy
- Year built: 1898 or 1899
- Renovated: 2014-2015
- Destroyed: 1 December 2012

Design and construction
- Architect: Matthew Davy (renovation)
- Architecture firm: Dave Pearson Architects (renovation)
- Developer: JP Singh and Kuljeet Singh (renovation)
- Main contractor: Ebenezer Braidwood Gray (original)

Heritage New Zealand – Category 2
- Designated: 10 October 1990
- Reference no.: 5261

Guy's Homestead is a late 19th century homestead located in East Auckland (Note: Sources provide different locations for the homestead, these include Pakuranga, Huntington Park, East Tamaki, Botany, and Botany Downs.), New Zealand, and listed as a Category 2 building by Heritage New Zealand.

After being burnt down in an act of arson it was rebuilt and turned into an early learning centre.

== Description ==
Guy's Homestead is an example of the contemporary architectural style of the time. It features french doors, two brick chimneys, and scalloped rafters.

== History ==
Andrew and Rose Guy migrated from Ireland to New Zealand in the late 1870s. Guy ran a horsecar business in Epsom and Remuera and the profits from selling it were used to buy the farm and homestead.

The homestead was originally built in 1898 by Ebenezer Braidwood Gray to replace an earlier homestead that burnt down. After Gray died on 4 January 1899 the property passed to his brother. As his brother was living in Ontario the property was sold and in February 1900 it was purchased by Andrew Guy.

Guy died in 1922 and attempts to then sell the estate failed. In October 1928 the southern half of the estate came to be owned by William John Guy, Guy's son, with the northern half and homestead being owned by The Guardian Trust. The northern half of the estate was used for dairy farming by the Finlay family.

On 14 November 1938, two farmers: John Thomas Logan Shaw and William Robson Andrew Shaw acquired the property. The property later became owned by companies and in 1985 the Manukau City Council purchased part of the property for an extension of Ti Rakau Drive.

The southern half would be subdivided over the years and by 1986 subdivision had ceased. The property remained in the Guy family's hands for 40 years until later being sold with the farmland.

In 1994 part of the original section was sold off to property developers and became the Huntington Park development.

The owner of the homestead in July, 1997 planned to develop the homestead into a restaurant, motel, and conference centre.

In 1997 it was purchased by investors from Hong Kong. Following this purchase the property had gone into desuetude and was repeatedly vandalised prior to the arson. On 1 December 2012, the homestead was damaged by an act of arson.

In 2013 two property developers, JP and Kuljeet Singh, bought it and had the property restored. In May 2015 the homestead opened as an early learning centre with a focus on teaching children about agriculture and rural life.

Following the arson some local residents campaigned for new regulations governing heritage protected properties.
