= Burswood =

Burswood may refer to several places.

== Places in Perth, Western Australia ==
- Burswood, Western Australia, a suburb
- Burswood Entertainment Complex, a resort and casino now known as Crown Perth
- Burswood railway station

== Places in New Zealand ==
- Burswood, New Zealand, a suburb of Auckland
