= Huntington Park, New Zealand =

Huntington Park
- Suburb
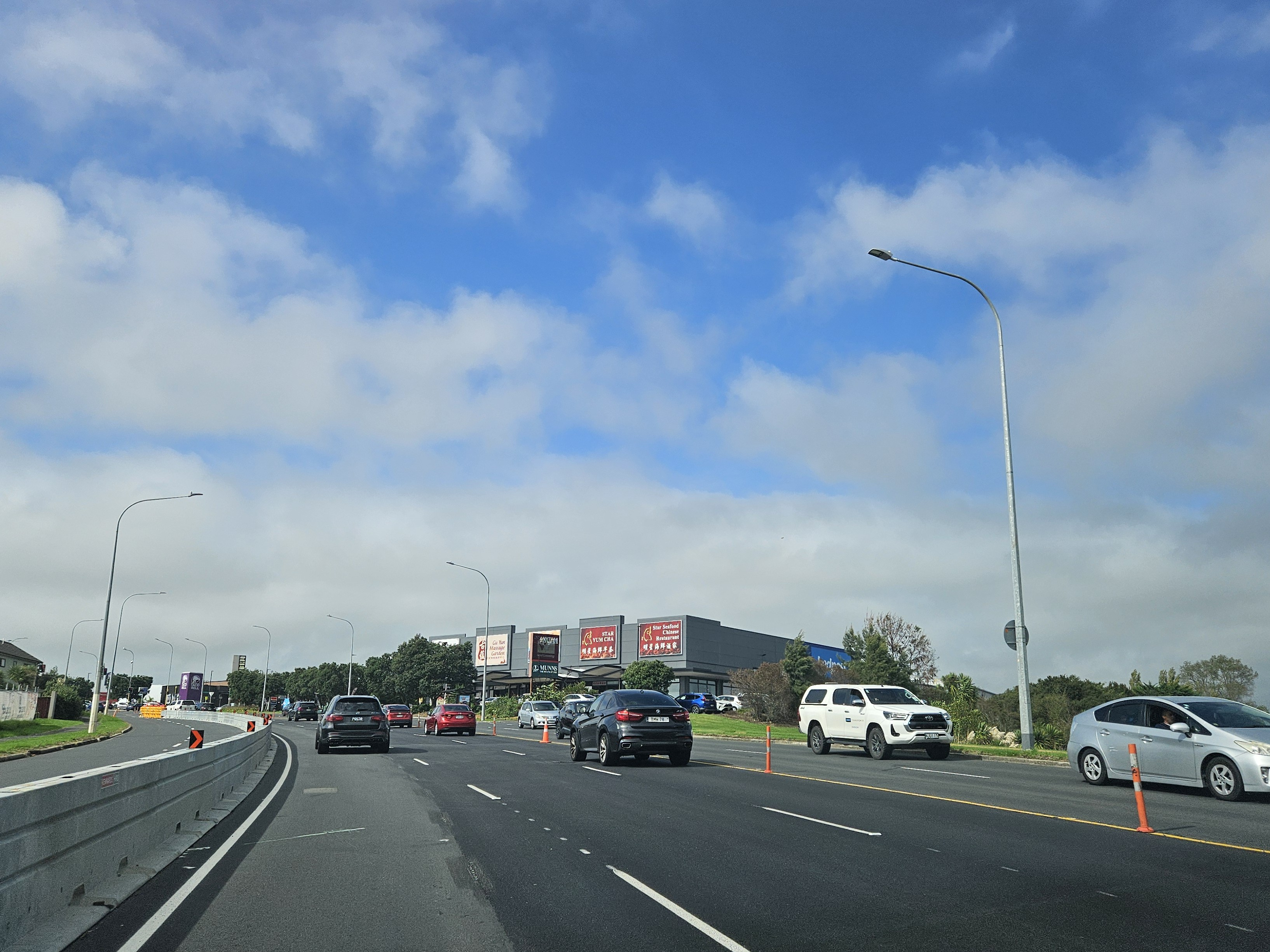
- Ti Rakau Drive
- Interactive map of Huntington Park
- Coordinates: 36.933°S 174.906°E
- Country: New Zealand
- City: Auckland
- Local authority: Auckland Council
- Electoral ward: Howick ward
- Local board: Howick Local Board

Area
  - Land: 44 ha (110 acres)

Population (June 2025)
  - Total: 2,180
  - Density: 5,000/km^{2} (13,000/sq mi)

Burswood	Golflands	Northpark
East Tāmaki	Huntington Park	Botany
East Tāmaki	East Tāmaki	East Tāmaki

Huntington Park is an eastern suburb of the city of Auckland, New Zealand. The area is bounded on the north by Ti Rakau Drive, on the east by Te Irirangi Drive, and to the south and west by the Greenmount Drainage Reserve. The area is called Greenmount on some maps. The northeast corner contains The Hub shopping mall.

== History ==
The Guy family farmed in the area for 40 years from the late 19th century. The Guy homestead, built in 1898, was badly damaged by a suspected arson in 2012. The house was later restored. Huntington Park was named after a farm owned by George Harris in the area, that had the similar name Huntingdom Farm.

Most of the houses were built in the 1990s. Even in 1998, the area was rural. The Hub Botany shopping centre opened in Huntington Park in 2001.

== Demographics ==
Huntington Park covers 0.44 km^{2} (0.17 sq mi) and had an estimated population of 2,180 as of June 2025, with a population density of 4,955 people per km^{2}.

Historical population
Year	Pop.	±% p.a.
2006	1,848	—
2013	1,974	+0.95%
2018	1,902	−0.74%
2023	1,965	+0.65%

Huntington Park had a population of 1,965 in the 2023 New Zealand census, an increase of 63 people (3.3%) since the 2018 census, and a decrease of 9 people (−0.5%) since the 2013 census. There were 888 males, 1,071 females and 6 people of other genders in 819 dwellings. 2.3% of people identified as LGBTIQ+. The median age was 42.3 years (compared with 38.1 years nationally). There were 303 people (15.4%) aged under 15 years, 321 (16.3%) aged 15 to 29, 897 (45.6%) aged 30 to 64, and 438 (22.3%) aged 65 or older.

People could identify as more than one ethnicity. The results were 43.2% European (Pākehā); 5.5% Māori; 6.7% Pasifika; 45.3% Asian; 4.9% Middle Eastern, Latin American and African New Zealanders (MELAA); and 3.8% other, which includes people giving their ethnicity as "New Zealander". English was spoken by 90.2%, Māori language by 1.1%, Samoan by 2.1%, and other languages by 39.8%. No language could be spoken by 1.8% (e.g. too young to talk). New Zealand Sign Language was known by 0.2%. The percentage of people born overseas was 56.6, compared with 28.8% nationally.

Religious affiliations were 40.2% Christian, 5.6% Hindu, 3.5% Islam, 0.3% Māori religious beliefs, 2.9% Buddhist, 0.2% New Age, and 2.0% other religions. People who answered that they had no religion were 40.0%, and 5.3% of people did not answer the census question.

Of those at least 15 years old, 462 (27.8%) people had a bachelor's or higher degree, 720 (43.3%) had a post-high school certificate or diploma, and 480 (28.9%) people exclusively held high school qualifications. The median income was $40,000, compared with $41,500 nationally. 171 people (10.3%) earned over $100,000 compared to 12.1% nationally. The employment status of those at least 15 was that 819 (49.3%) people were employed full-time, 195 (11.7%) were part-time, and 39 (2.3%) were unemployed.
