= Golflands =

- Suburb
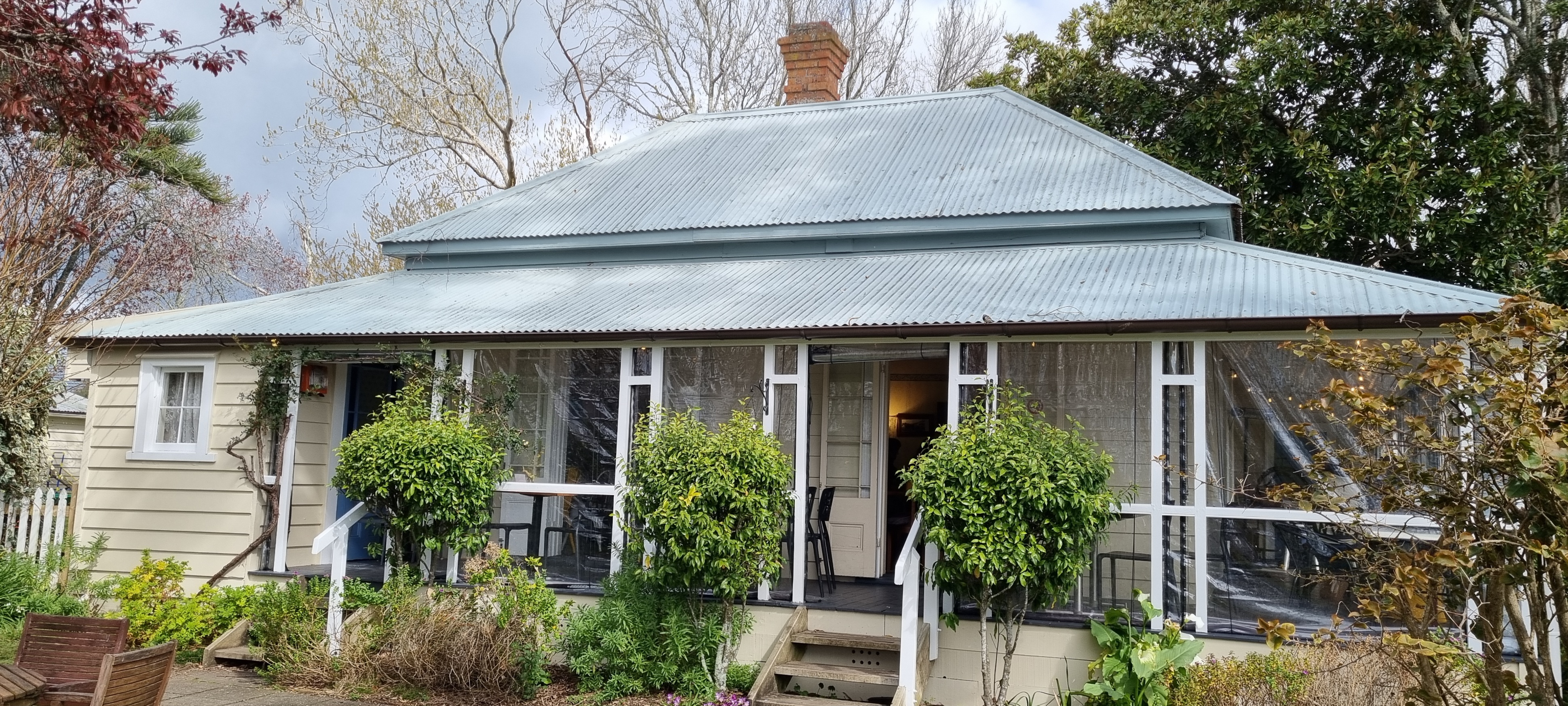
- The historic Hawthorn Dene house
- Interactive map of Golflands
- Coordinates: 36.921°S 174.910°E
- Country: New Zealand
- City: Auckland
- Local authority: Auckland Council
- Electoral ward: Howick ward
- Local board: Howick Local Board

Area
  - Land: 141 ha (350 acres)

Population (June 2025)
  - Total: 2,680
  - Density: 1,900/km^{2} (4,920/sq mi)

	Highland Park	Botany Downs
	Golflands	Northpark
Burswood	Huntington Park	Botany

Golflands is an eastern suburb of the city of Auckland, New Zealand. The Pakuranga Golf Club is part of the suburb, and many of the streets have names related to golf or notable golf players, such as Bob Charles drive.

== Geography ==
Golflands is bounded by Cascades Road in the north, Ti Rakau Drive in the south, and the Pakuranga Stream and Pakuranga Creek on the west. Botany Road passes through the eastern portion of the suburb.

== History ==
Golflands is part of the rohe of Ngāi Tai ki Tāmaki, who descend from the crew of the Tainui migratory waka, who visited the area around the year 1300. The mouth of the Tāmaki River was traditionally known as Te Wai ō Tāiki ("The Waters of Tāiki"), named after the Ngāi Tai ancestor Tāiki. Tāiki settled with his followers along the eastern shores of the Tāmaki River, alongside the descendants of Huiārangi of the early iwi Te Tini ō Maruiwi. The traditional name for the Pakuranga Creek is Te Whārau. By the 16th century, the surrounding area was the site of extensive stonefield gardens. During the Musket Wars in the 1820s, most members of Ngāi Tai fled to the Waikato for temporary refuge during this time, and when English missionary William Thomas Fairburn visited the area in 1833, it was mostly unoccupied.

In 1836, William Thomas Fairburn brokered a land sale between Tāmaki Māori chiefs covering the majority of modern-day South Auckland, East Auckland and the Pōhutukawa Coast. The sale was envisioned as a way to end hostilities in the area, but it is unclear what the chiefs understood or consented to. Māori continued to live in the area, unchanged by this sale. In 1854 when Fairburn's purchase was investigated by the New Zealand Land Commission, a Ngāi Tai reserve was created around the Wairoa River and Umupuia areas, and as a part of the agreement, members of Ngāi Tai agreed to leave their traditional settlements to the west.

In 1847, Howick was established as a defensive outpost for Auckland, by fencibles (retired British Army soldiers) and their families. The historic Hawthorndene Homestead was constructed in the suburb in the 1850s, and the area was primarily farmland until the mid to late 20th Century.

In 1970, the Pakuranga Country Club (now known as the Pakuranga Golf Club) was established on farmland by the Cascades Golf Company, wanting to establish an American-style country club. In the mid-1980s, the area surrounding the golf club was developed into suburban housing, with the first sections sold inn May 1987. In 2012, Elim Christian College opened a junior campus in the suburb, who purchased some of the Pakuranga Gold Club to use for playing fields. In the same year, a controversial electricity substation was constructed in Golflands. Another part of the golf course was developed as a retirement home in 2020.

== Demographics ==
Golflands covers 1.41 km^{2} (0.54 sq mi) and had an estimated population of 2,680 as of June 2025, with a population density of 1,901 people per km^{2}.

Historical population
Year	Pop.	±% p.a.
2006	2,388	—
2013	2,373	−0.09%
2018	2,460	+0.72%
2023	2,490	+0.24%

Golflands had a population of 2,490 in the 2023 New Zealand census, an increase of 30 people (1.2%) since the 2018 census, and an increase of 117 people (4.9%) since the 2013 census. There were 1,194 males, 1,275 females and 18 people of other genders in 906 dwellings. 2.5% of people identified as LGBTIQ+. The median age was 44.0 years (compared with 38.1 years nationally). There were 417 people (16.7%) aged under 15 years, 354 (14.2%) aged 15 to 29, 1,167 (46.9%) aged 30 to 64, and 552 (22.2%) aged 65 or older.

People could identify as more than one ethnicity. The results were 50.5% European (Pākehā); 4.7% Māori; 3.9% Pasifika; 43.6% Asian; 4.2% Middle Eastern, Latin American and African New Zealanders (MELAA); and 2.4% other, which includes people giving their ethnicity as "New Zealander". English was spoken by 89.6%, Māori language by 0.6%, Samoan by 0.5%, and other languages by 42.2%. No language could be spoken by 2.3% (e.g. too young to talk). New Zealand Sign Language was known by 0.4%. The percentage of people born overseas was 56.7, compared with 28.8% nationally.

Religious affiliations were 40.7% Christian, 2.8% Hindu, 2.5% Islam, 0.1% Māori religious beliefs, 3.3% Buddhist, 0.2% New Age, 0.4% Jewish, and 2.2% other religions. People who answered that they had no religion were 42.0%, and 5.7% of people did not answer the census question.

Of those at least 15 years old, 654 (31.5%) people had a bachelor's or higher degree, 846 (40.8%) had a post-high school certificate or diploma, and 579 (27.9%) people exclusively held high school qualifications. The median income was $39,600, compared with $41,500 nationally. 294 people (14.2%) earned over $100,000 compared to 12.1% nationally. The employment status of those at least 15 was that 1,002 (48.3%) people were employed full-time, 231 (11.1%) were part-time, and 57 (2.7%) were unemployed.

== Amenities ==
- Frank Nobilo Esplanade Reserve is a nature reserve and walkway along the eastern shores of the Pakuranga Creek. A bridge in the south of the reserve connects Golflands to Burswood.

== Bibliography ==
- La Roche, Alan (2011). Grey's Folly: A History of Howick, Pakuranga, Bucklands-Eastern Beaches, East Tamaki, Whitford, Beachlands and Maraetai. Auckland: Tui Vale Productions. ISBN 978-0-473-18547-3. OCLC 1135039710. Wikidata Q118286377.
