= Hampton Park =

Hampton Park may refer to:

== Australia ==
- Hampton Park, Victoria, a suburb in Melbourne
- Hampton Park Football Club, an Australian rules football club

== Canada ==
- Hampton Park, Ottawa, a park and neighbourhood

== New Zealand ==
- Hampton Park, New Zealand, a volcano in the Auckland volcanic field

== England ==
- Hampton Park, Herefordshire, a place in Herefordshire
- Hampton Park, Southampton, a location in the United Kingdom

== United States ==
- Hampton Park (Richmond Heights, Missouri), listed on the National Register of Historic Places (NRHP) in St. Louis County, Missouri
- Hampton Park Terrace Historic District, Charleston, South Carolina, NRHP-listed
- Hampton Park (Charleston), a municipal park located in Charleston, South Carolina
