= Burswood, New Zealand =

Suburb in Auckland, New Zealand

Burswood
- Suburb
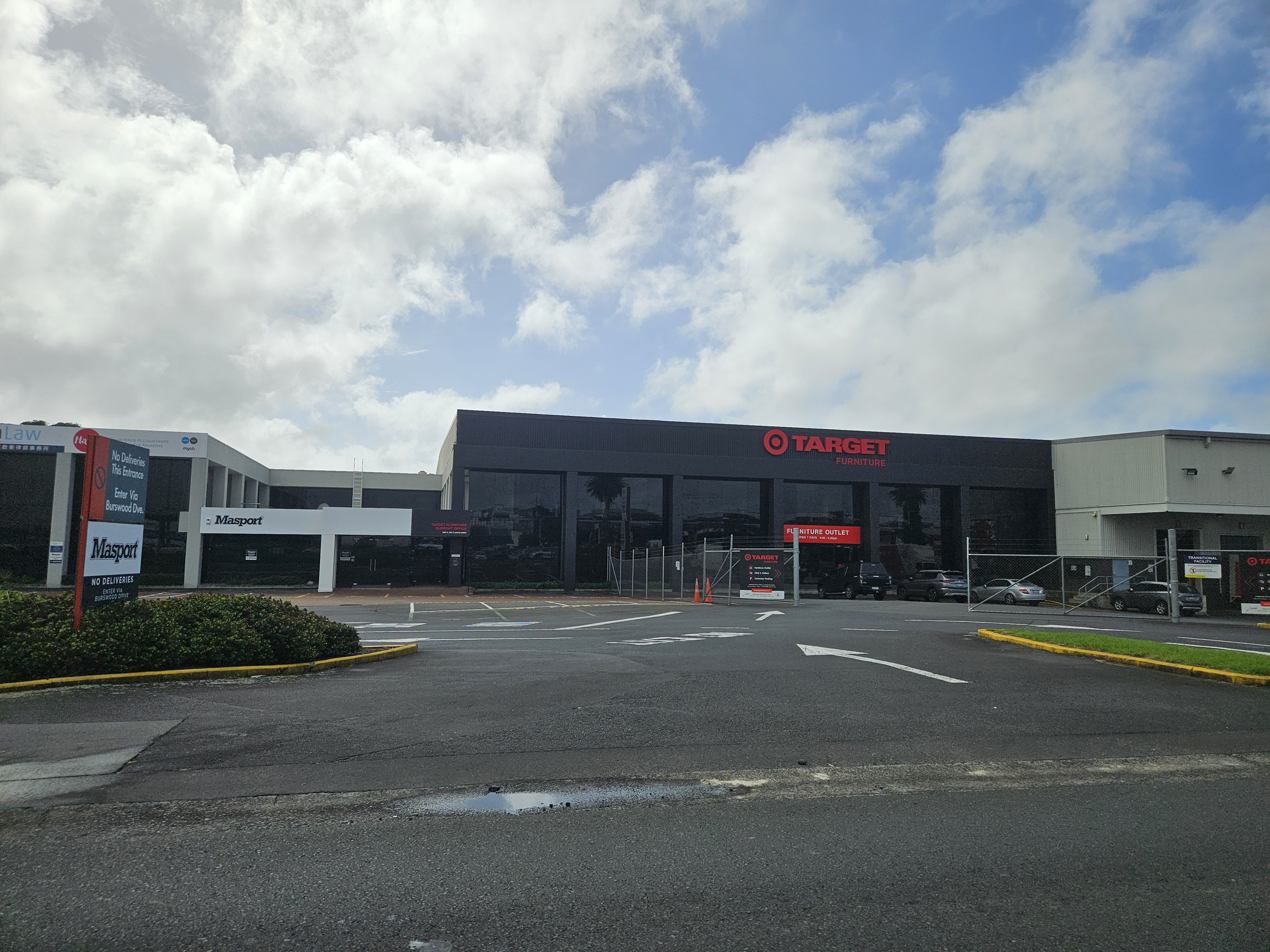
- Outlet stores in Burswood, on Ti Rakau Drive
- Interactive map of Burswood
- Coordinates: 36.923°S 174.898°E
- Country: New Zealand
- City: Auckland
- Local authority: Auckland Council
- Electoral ward: Howick ward
- Local board: Howick Local Board

Area
  - Land: 53 ha (130 acres)

Population (June 2025)
  - Total: 1,690
  - Density: 3,200/km^{2} (8,300/sq mi)

		Howick
Pakuranga	Burswood	Golflands
Highbrook	East Tāmaki	Huntington Park

Burswood is a residential suburb of Auckland which is separated from the rest of the city by the Pakuranga Stream on its west, north and eastern sides, and the major road Ti Rakau Drive on its south. Population density is higher than in most of Auckland, with no quarter acre sections.

== Geography ==
Burswood is a peninsula in East Auckland, surrounded by the estuarine Pakuranga Creek to the north, west and east. The southern banks of the creek around Burswood Reserve are formed by a lava flow from Styaks Swamp. Ti Rakau Drive, a major arterial road in Auckland, is found to the south of the suburb.

== History ==
Burswood is part of the rohe of Ngāi Tai ki Tāmaki, who descend from the crew of the Tainui migratory waka, who visited the area around the year 1300. Burswood was the location of the kāinga Te Titoki and Mangatu.

In 1973, Ti Rakau Drive was constructed, which included the construction of the Ti Rakau Bridge across the Pakuranga Creek. A housing estate was established by Fletcher Homes in 1991, when the company constructed 500 homes in the area.

The Eastern Busway began construction in 2022, which involved a deviation through the suburb, and the construction of a planned busway station.

== Demographics ==
Burswood covers 0.53 km^{2} (0.20 sq mi) and had an estimated population of 1,690 as of June 2025, with a population density of 3,189 people per km^{2}.

Historical population
Year	Pop.	±% p.a.
2006	1,734	—
2013	1,623	−0.94%
2018	1,695	+0.87%
2023	1,596	−1.20%

Burswood had a population of 1,596 in the 2023 New Zealand census, a decrease of 99 people (−5.8%) since the 2018 census, and a decrease of 27 people (−1.7%) since the 2013 census. There were 795 males, 792 females and 6 people of other genders in 549 dwellings. 2.1% of people identified as LGBTIQ+. The median age was 39.9 years (compared with 38.1 years nationally). There were 255 people (16.0%) aged under 15 years, 252 (15.8%) aged 15 to 29, 855 (53.6%) aged 30 to 64, and 231 (14.5%) aged 65 or older.

People could identify as more than one ethnicity. The results were 34.8% European (Pākehā); 7.3% Māori; 7.7% Pasifika; 55.5% Asian; 3.8% Middle Eastern, Latin American and African New Zealanders (MELAA); and 3.2% other, which includes people giving their ethnicity as "New Zealander". English was spoken by 86.7%, Māori language by 1.5%, Samoan by 1.3%, and other languages by 45.5%. No language could be spoken by 2.6% (e.g. too young to talk). New Zealand Sign Language was known by 0.4%. The percentage of people born overseas was 56.4, compared with 28.8% nationally.

Religious affiliations were 32.3% Christian, 6.0% Hindu, 4.9% Islam, 0.4% Māori religious beliefs, 2.8% Buddhist, and 2.3% other religions. People who answered that they had no religion were 45.1%, and 6.0% of people did not answer the census question.

Of those at least 15 years old, 426 (31.8%) people had a bachelor's or higher degree, 480 (35.8%) had a post-high school certificate or diploma, and 432 (32.2%) people exclusively held high school qualifications. The median income was $47,200, compared with $41,500 nationally. 165 people (12.3%) earned over $100,000 compared to 12.1% nationally. The employment status of those at least 15 was that 771 (57.5%) people were employed full-time, 138 (10.3%) were part-time, and 33 (2.5%) were unemployed.

== Amenities ==
- Burswood Park is a suburban park located in the centre of the suburb, which features a playground and fitness equipment.
- Burswood Esplanade Reserve is a public nature reserve on the banks of the Pakuranga Creek. The reserve has a walking track, which has a bridge that connects over the creek to Frank Nobilo Reserve in Golflands to the east. A second bridge is planned to connect Burswood Park to Pakuranga Heights to the north.

== Bibliography ==
- Clark, Jennifer A. (2002). East Tamaki: Including the Adjoining Areas of Flat Bush and Otara. Papatoetoe Historical Society. ISBN 0-473-09058-9. OCLC 156099387. Wikidata Q120020174.
- La Roche, Alan (2011). Grey's Folly: A History of Howick, Pakuranga, Bucklands-Eastern Beaches, East Tamaki, Whitford, Beachlands and Maraetai. Auckland: Tui Vale Productions. ISBN 978-0-473-18547-3. OCLC 1135039710. Wikidata Q118286377.
