= Green Hill, New Zealand =

Volcanic cone in Auckland, New Zealand

Green Hill
- Mātanginui, Greenmount
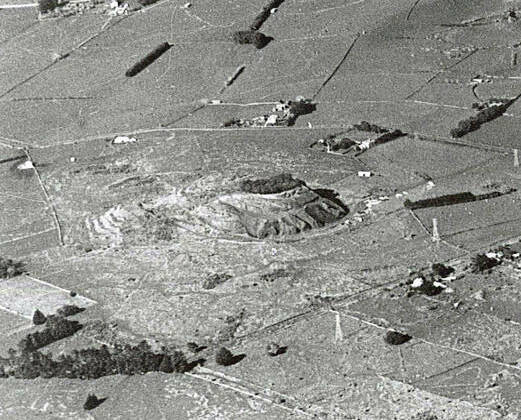
- Aerial view of Green Hill in 1949, before the majority of quarrying had been undertaken.

Highest point
- Elevation: 78 m (256 ft)
- Coordinates: 36°56′24″S 174°53′54″E

Geography
- Location within New Zealand
- Location: East Tāmaki, Auckland, New Zealand

Geology
- Volcanic field: Auckland volcanic field

Green Hill (also known as Mātanginui or Greenmount) is one of the volcanoes in the Auckland volcanic field, located in the suburb of East Tāmaki. It erupted approximately 20,000 years ago, and its scoria cone had a peak 78 metres above sea level (around 48 m higher than the surrounding land) and had a grove of karaka trees. The hill was the site of a Ngāi Tai iwi pā.

== History ==
Green Hill, known as Mātanginui, was a traditional settlement for Ngāi Tai ki Tāmaki, the name either being translated as "The Pā Taken with Much Crying" or "Big Breeze". The site was visited by early ancestor Toi-te-huatahi, where he planted a grove of karaka trees. By the 16th century, the surrounding area became extensive stonefield gardens due to its productive volcanic soil, and a defensive pā was constructed at the peak of the hill. Mātanginui was occupied by Ngāi Tai until the early 19th century.

Green Hill and the surrounding area was farmed by the Styak family. The name recalls Mrs Styak's home at Randalstown in Northern Ireland, which was called Green Bank. Quarrying of the hill began around 1870. Green Hill and nearby Otara Hill were together referred to as Bessy Bell and Mary Gray after an old Scottish ballad.

The hill remained in the hands of the Styak family, until 1932 when Sarah Jane Lushington (née Styak) gifted 40 hectares of land to the Manukau County Council, to create a public park and recreation ground called Styak-Lushington Park. Instead of creating a park, the council leased the land for farming and quarrying. By the 1960s, the hill had almost been entirely quarried.

The council began using a small section of the site as a landfill, and in 1979 the entire former quarry site was leased as a landfill. By 1992, methane gas from the landfill was being collected and used to power a gas power plant at the site. In 2005, the landfill was closed, and from 2006 to 2016 work was undertaken to restore the site using clean fill to recreate a hill.

The site is planned to be redeveloped into an urban park, with a 70 metre-high flat-topped grass hill.

== Gallery ==
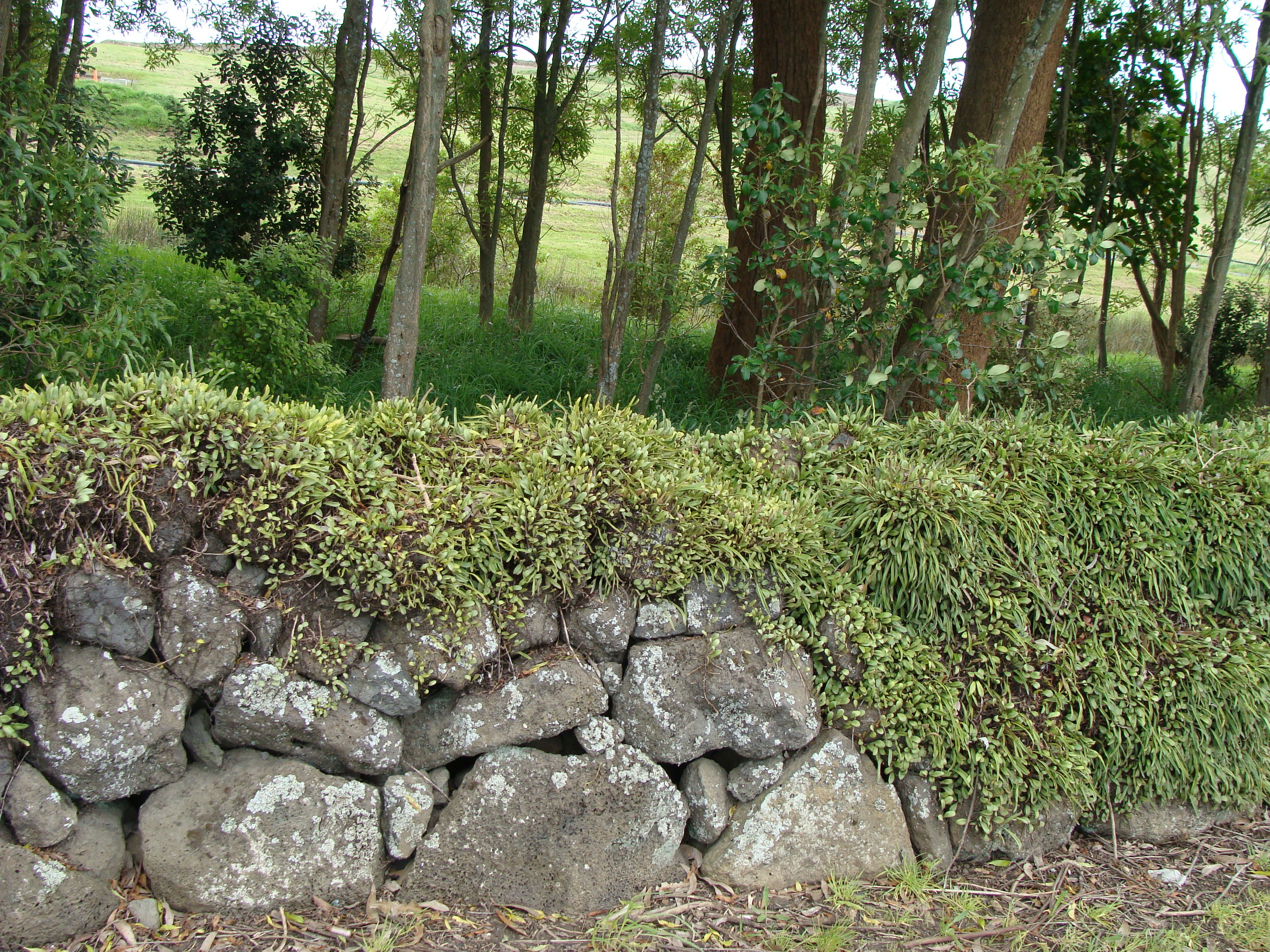
Basalt dry-stone wall with former site of Green Hill in distance

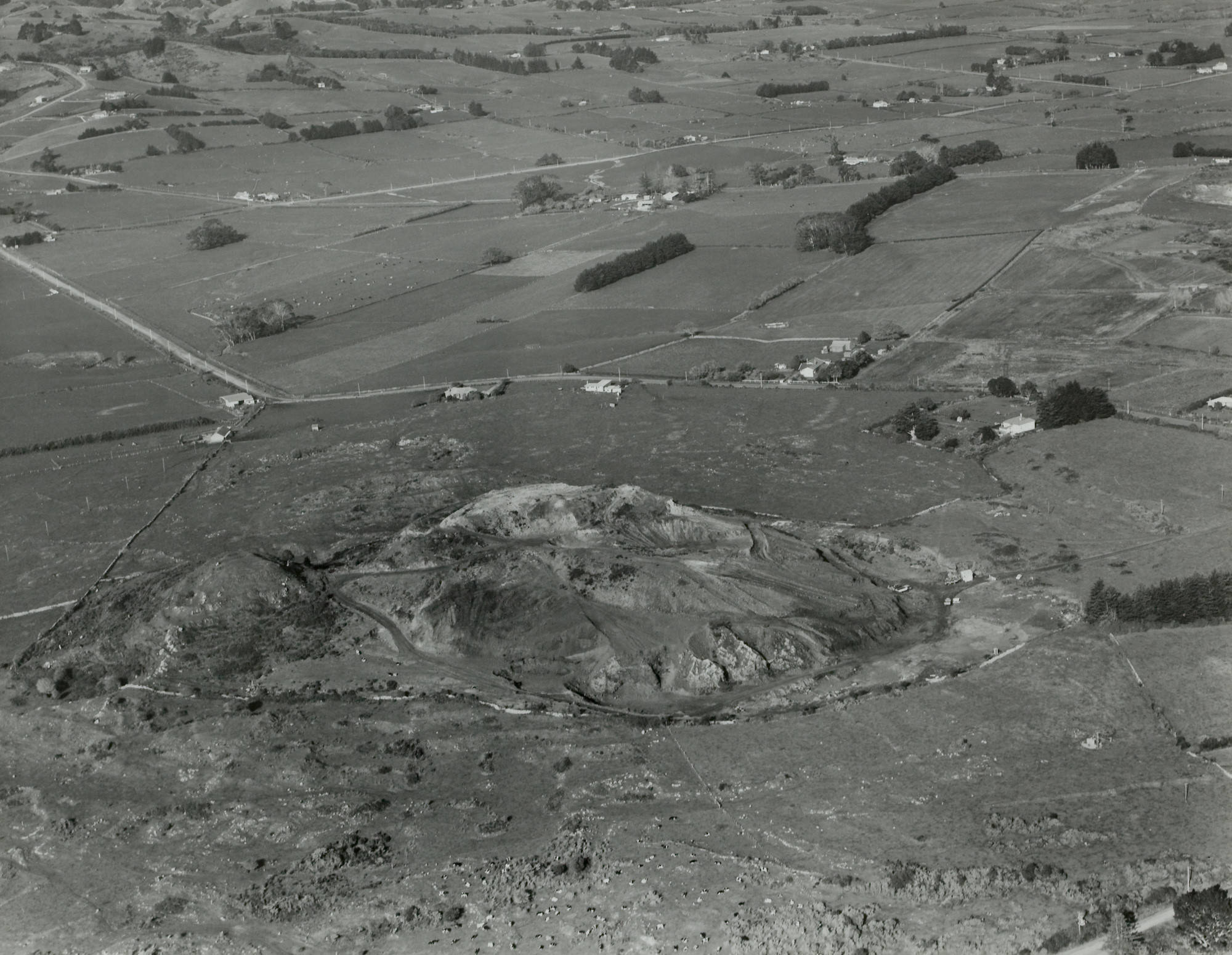
Aerial view of the site of Green Hill in 1964, during quarrying

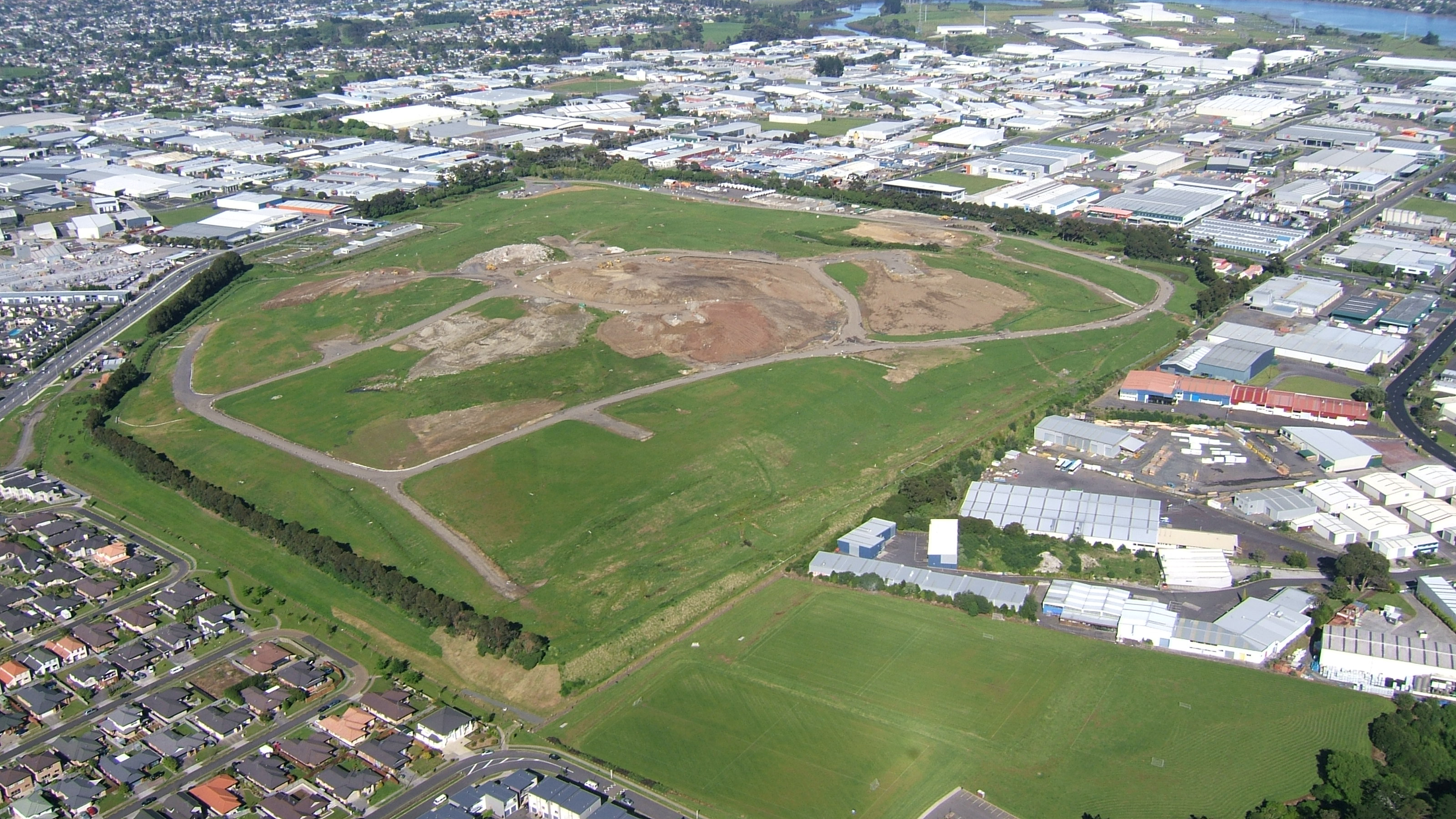
Aerial view of the site of Green Hill in 2009, after being quarried and used as a landfill

== Bibliography ==
- Clark, Jennifer A. (2002). East Tamaki: Including the Adjoining Areas of Flat Bush and Otara. Papatoetoe Historical Society. ISBN 0-473-09058-9. OCLC 156099387. Wikidata Q120020174.
