= Pakuranga Creek =

Stream in East Auckland, New Zealand

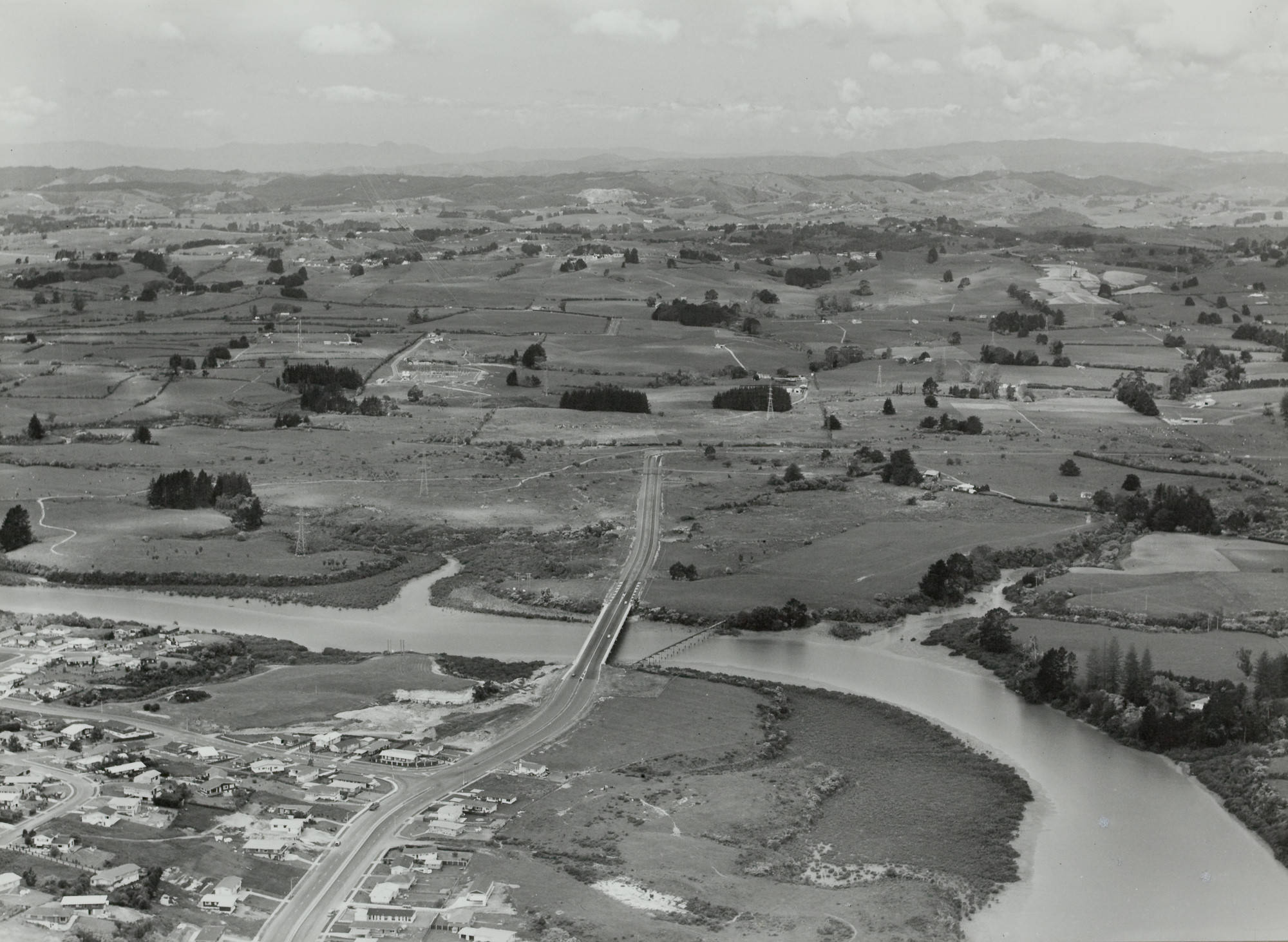
- View of the newly constructed Ti Rakau Bridge over the Pakuranga Creek in 1973

- Mouth of the Pakuranga Creek Pakuranga Creek (New Zealand)
- Route of the Pakuranga Creek

Location
- Country: New Zealand
- Region: Auckland Region

Physical characteristics
- Source: Pakuranga
  - coordinates: 36.90385°S 174.89072°E
- Mouth: Tāmaki River
  - coordinates: 36.92405°S 174.86427°E

Basin features
- Progression: Pakuranga Creek → Tāmaki River → Tāmaki Strait → Hauraki Gulf
- Tributaries
  - left: Pakuranga Stream
Bridges
Ti Rakau Drive Bridge,
Ti Rakau

Pakuranga Creek is a tidal estuary and stream in the Auckland Region of New Zealand's North Island. The creek flows from inland Pakuranga, meeting the Pakuranga Stream and flows into the Tāmaki River.

== Geography ==
The Pakuranga Creek is the major catchment for the East Auckland area. It is one of the four major estuarial arms of the Tāmaki River. The freshwater creek flows south from Pakuranga Road, past Elm Park School. Botany Creek is a major tributary, and flows into the creek at the two metre-high Cascade Waterfalls.

== History ==
The creek is in the traditional rohe of Ngāi Tai ki Tāmaki. The traditional name for the creek is Te Whārau, and the surrounding area was the site of extensive stonefield gardens. The southern banks of the creek around Burswood Reserve are formed by a lava flow from Styaks Swamp.

Fencible Captain C.H.M. purchased 95 acres adjacent to the creek in 1851, constructing a large two-storey house, which later became known as the Bell House. During the early colonial period, the volcanic basalt around Ti Rakau Drive at Burswood was quarried. Close to the quarry in East Tāmaki was the location of Allen's stone wharf, which was mainly used to transport farm produce to Auckland.

In 1973, Ti Rakau Drive was constructed, which included the construction of the Ti Rakau Bridge across the Pakuranga Creek.
