= Botany, New Zealand =

Botany
- Suburb
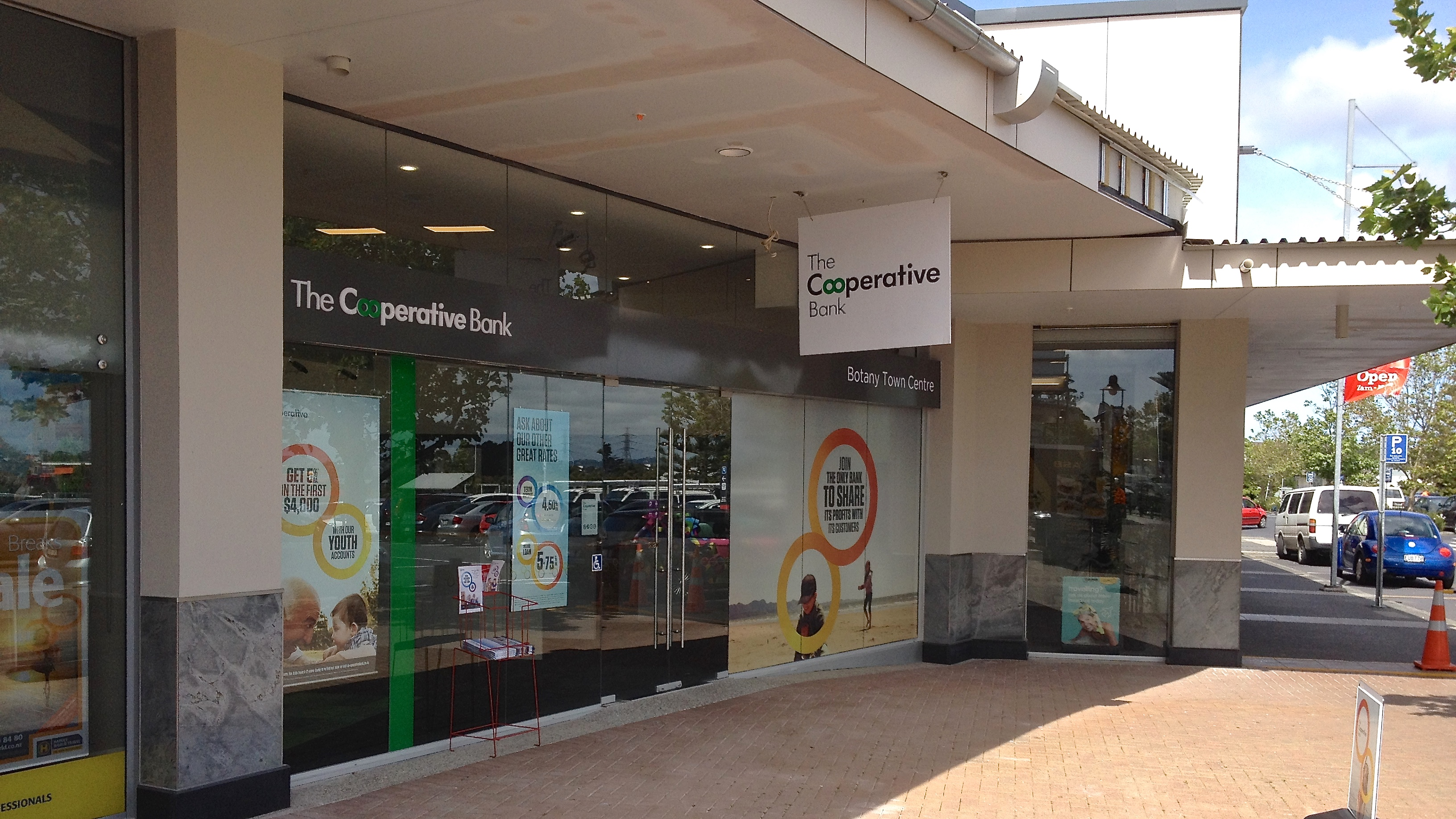
- The Co-operative Bank at Botany Town Centre
- Interactive map of Botany
- Coordinates: 36.9289°S 174.9124°E
- Country: New Zealand
- City: Auckland
- Local authority: Auckland Council
- Electoral ward: Howick ward
- Local board: Howick Local Board

Golflands	Northpark	Shamrock Park
Huntington Park	Botany	Dannemora
Greenmount	East Tāmaki Heights	East Tāmaki

Botany is a suburb of the East Auckland in New Zealand. It developed in the early 2000s, and is centred around the Botany Town Centre commercial area. Since 2008, a general electorate, Botany, has reflected the name of the suburb.

== Etymology ==
The suburb is named after Botany Road, which is in turn was named after Botany Bay in Australia, which has been visited by James Cook. Botany became used as a name for the area in 1999, and was popularised after the opening of the Botany Town Centre.

== History ==
Botany Road likely began life as a moa track, and later developed into inland ara (walkways) by Ngāi Tai ki Tāmaki. During the latter 19th and 20th Centuries, the area was predominantly farmland. In 1946, the area west of Botany was considered a potential location for the new international airport, which was eventually constructed in Māngere.

The Botany Town Centre shopping precinct opened in 2001. This led to the area being established as a suburb, although its borders are ill-defined. In 2004, the Manukau City Council established the Botany Ward, and in 2007 the newly established Botany electorate was named after the suburb. In 2001, AMP began constructing the Hub, a 5.2 hectares (13 acres) shopping precinct adjacent to the Botany Town Centre. Commercial stores outside of the Botany Town Centre precinct include Pak'nSave, The Warehouse, Torpedo7, Noel leeming, Briscoes and Rebel Sport.

In 2018, Auckland Transport began planning rapid public transport between Botany and Auckland Airport. It is part of a wider programme to improve the transport system in South Auckland. A busway connecting Botany to Auckland's central suburbs is due to be completed in 2027.

== Amenities ==
- Botany Library, which opened in 2004
- Gillard Reserve
- Guys Reserve
- Logan Carr Park
- Paradice Ice Skating Botany
- St Columba Presbyterian Church
- Whaka Maumahara Reserve

== Education ==
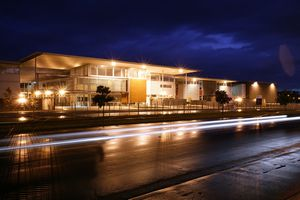
Botany Downs Secondary College

Botany Downs Secondary College is a secondary school (years 9–13) with a roll of 1,994. The school opened in 2004. Elim Christian College is a state-integrated Christian composite school (years 1–13) with a roll of 1,071.

Botany Downs School is a contributing primary school (years 1–6) with a roll of 572.

All schools are coeducational. Rolls are as of July 2026.
