= Little Rangitoto =

Volcano in Auckland, New Zealand

Coordinates: 36.875407°S 174.809636°E

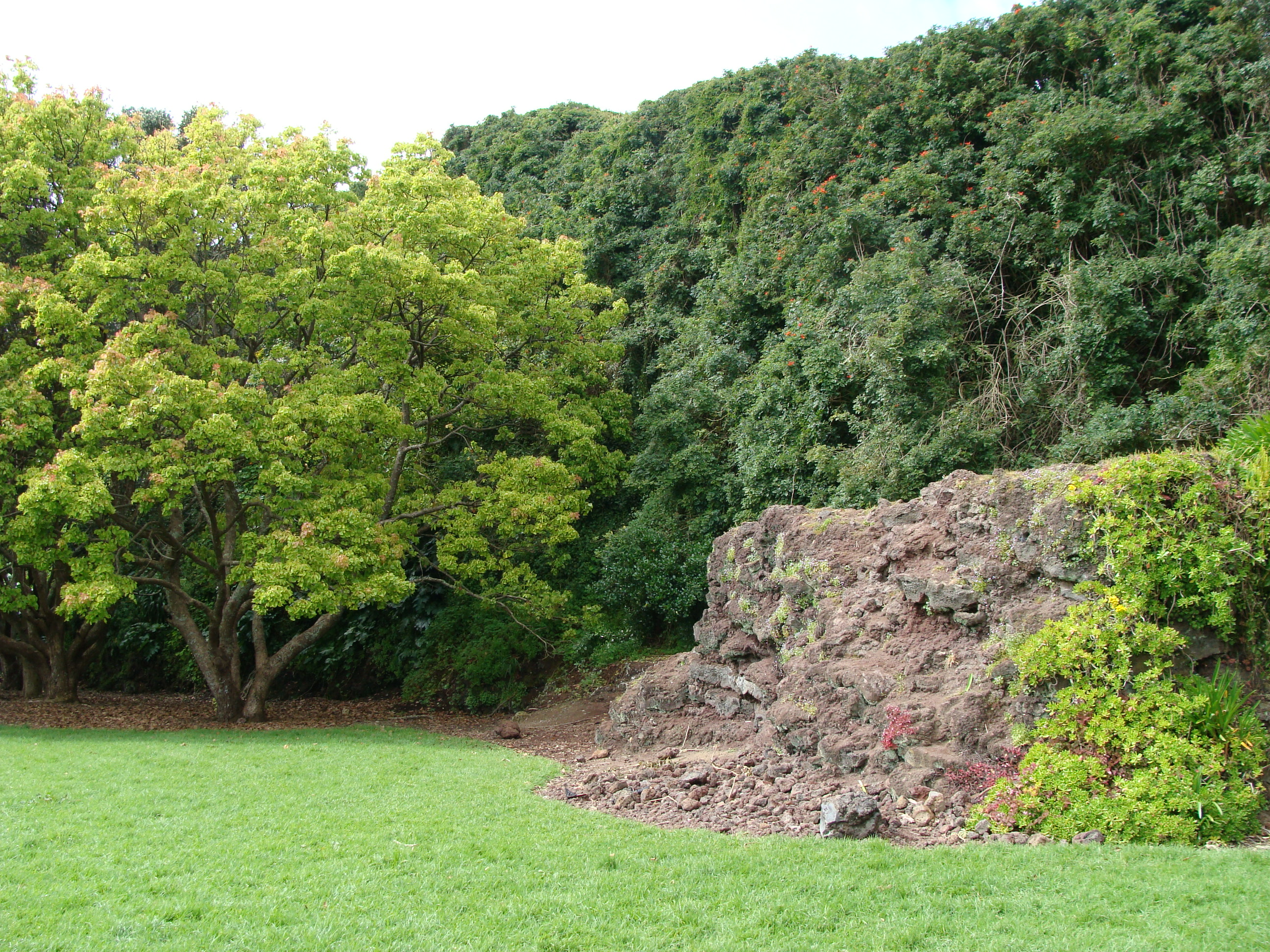
Vegetation covered quarry-face in Little Rangitoto Reserve. The exposed rock shows layers of scoria and lava.

Little Rangitoto, officially known as Maungarāhiri / Little Rangitoto, and also as Rangitoto-iti, is a volcano in the Auckland volcanic field in Remuera, New Zealand. The name Maungarāhiri refers to Rāhiri, an ancestor of Ngāpuhi, who journeyed around the North Island (Te Ika-a-Māui). In the 1700s and early 1800s, the volcano was the site of Ngāti Whātua-o-Ōrākei seasonal farms.

This scoria cone had a peak 75 metres above sea level (30m higher than the surrounding land) before it was mostly quarried away. The quarry site is now Little Rangitoto Reserve, having been partly filled with refuse in the 1950s. Remnants of the southern slopes of the cone lie south of the reserve and underlie houses in Ventnor Road.

A lava flow burst forth from the northwestern base of the cone and flowed north down the valley west of Orakei Basin tuff ring and out into what is now Hobson Bay. Part of this flow can be seen among the mangroves adjacent to the Shore Rd bridge across the creek from St Kentigern School carpark. The toe of the lava flow is buried beneath mud and railway embankment near the Hobson Bay marina.
