= Northpark, New Zealand =

Northpark
- Suburb
- Interactive map of Northpark
- Coordinates: 36.916°S 174.920°E
- Country: New Zealand
- City: Auckland
- Local authority: Auckland Council
- Electoral ward: Howick ward
- Local board: Howick Local Board

Area
  - Land: 157 ha (390 acres)

Population (June 2025)
  - Total: 5,260
  - Density: 3,350/km^{2} (8,680/sq mi)

	Botany Downs	Somerville
Golflands	Northpark	Shamrock Park
Huntington Park	Botany	Dannemora

Northpark is an eastern suburb of the city of Auckland, New Zealand. Most of the houses were built in the 1990s. Before that, the area was rural.

== Demographics ==
Northpark covers 1.57 km^{2} (0.61 sq mi) and had an estimated population of 5,260 as of June 2025, with a population density of 3,350 people per km^{2}.

Historical population
Year	Pop.	±% p.a.
2006	5,067	—
2013	4,983	−0.24%
2018	5,094	+0.44%
2023	4,917	−0.70%

Northpark had a population of 4,917 in the 2023 New Zealand census, a decrease of 177 people (−3.5%) since the 2018 census, and a decrease of 66 people (−1.3%) since the 2013 census. There were 2,424 males, 2,484 females and 9 people of other genders in 1,638 dwellings. 2.4% of people identified as LGBTIQ+. The median age was 41.6 years (compared with 38.1 years nationally). There were 885 people (18.0%) aged under 15 years, 798 (16.2%) aged 15 to 29, 2,337 (47.5%) aged 30 to 64, and 894 (18.2%) aged 65 or older.

People could identify as more than one ethnicity. The results were 42.3% European (Pākehā); 3.7% Māori; 4.1% Pasifika; 52.0% Asian; 3.3% Middle Eastern, Latin American and African New Zealanders (MELAA); and 3.1% other, which includes people giving their ethnicity as "New Zealander". English was spoken by 88.4%, Māori language by 0.7%, Samoan by 1.0%, and other languages by 45.6%. No language could be spoken by 1.7% (e.g. too young to talk). New Zealand Sign Language was known by 0.2%. The percentage of people born overseas was 58.3, compared with 28.8% nationally.

Religious affiliations were 35.8% Christian, 3.8% Hindu, 2.5% Islam, 0.1% Māori religious beliefs, 3.0% Buddhist, 0.1% New Age, 0.1% Jewish, and 2.9% other religions. People who answered that they had no religion were 46.5%, and 5.2% of people did not answer the census question.

Of those at least 15 years old, 1,416 (35.1%) people had a bachelor's or higher degree, 1,593 (39.5%) had a post-high school certificate or diploma, and 1,026 (25.4%) people exclusively held high school qualifications. The median income was $44,300, compared with $41,500 nationally. 618 people (15.3%) earned over $100,000 compared to 12.1% nationally. The employment status of those at least 15 was that 2,067 (51.3%) people were employed full-time, 504 (12.5%) were part-time, and 81 (2.0%) were unemployed.

Individual statistical areas
Name	Area (km^{2})	Population	Density (per km^{2})	Dwellings	Median age	Median income
Northpark North	0.86	2,784	3,237	930	40.8 years	$43,600
Northpark South	0.71	2,133	3,004	711	42.9 years	$45,300
New Zealand					38.1 years	$41,500

== Education ==
Our Lady Star of the Sea School is a state-integrated coeducational Catholic contributing primary school (Year 1–6) with a roll of 297 as of July 2025.
