= Ōtara Hill =

Coordinates: 36.947105°S 174.898363°E

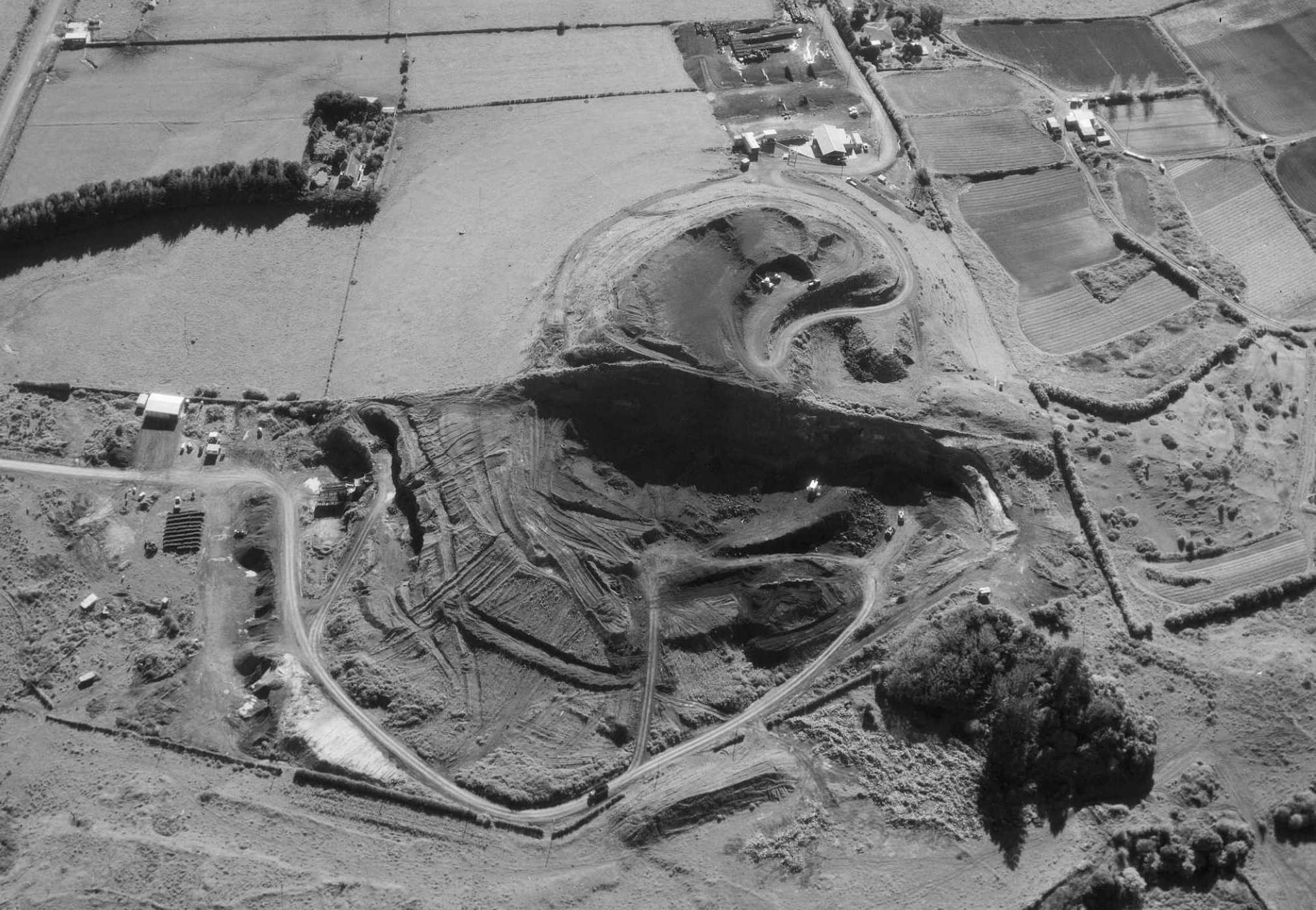
Aerial view of Ōtara Hill in 1958, before quarrying

Ōtara Hill (also Te Puke o Taramainuku or Smales Mount) is one of the volcanoes in the Auckland volcanic field. Its scoria cone reached 89 m above sea level (around 59 m higher than the surrounding land) before it was quarried away. The hill was the site of a pā named "Te Puke Ō Tara" meaning 'hill belonging to Tara', who was a Ngāi Tai Rangatira (or Māori Chief) of the area.

Like many Auckland volcanoes, Ōtara Hill has a notable tuff ring. It is located between Green Hill and Hampton Park. Green Hill and Ōtara Hill were together referred to as Bessy Bell and Mary Gray after an old Scottish ballad.
