= Auckland volcanic field =

Volcanic field in New Zealand

Auckland Volcanic Field
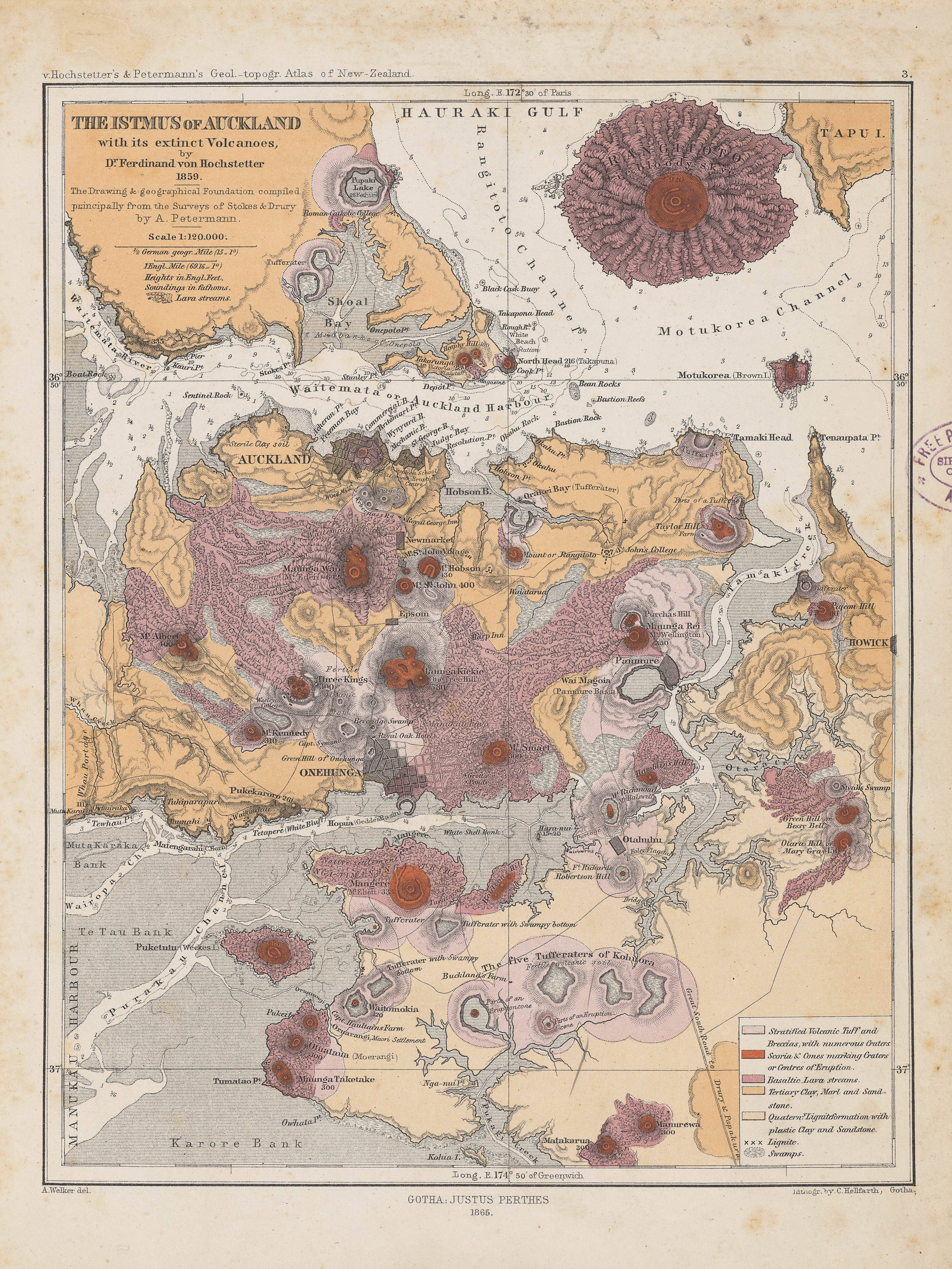
- Map of the field drawn by Hochstetter in 1859 and published in English in 1864

Highest point
- Elevation: 260 m (850 ft)
- Coordinates: 36.877°S 174.764°E

Geography
- Location and extent of the Auckland volcanic field. Clicking on the map enlarges it, and enables panning and mouseover of volcano name/wikilink. Please also see for age and geographical relationships to other North Island surface volcanism

Geology
- Rock age: Pleistocene to Meghalayan0.193–0.0006 Ma
- Mountain type: Volcanic field
- Rock type: Basalt
- Last eruption: c. 1400 CE

The Auckland volcanic field is an area of monogenetic volcanoes covered by much of the metropolitan area of Auckland, New Zealand's largest city, located in the North Island. The approximately 53 volcanoes in the field have produced a diverse array of maars (explosion craters), tuff rings, scoria cones, and lava flows. With the exception of Rangitoto, no volcano has erupted more than once, but the other eruptions lasted for various periods ranging from a few weeks to several years. Rangitoto erupted several times and recently twice; in an eruption that occurred about 600 years ago, followed by a second eruption approximately 50 years later. The field is fuelled entirely by basaltic magma, unlike the explosive subduction-driven volcanism in the central North Island, such as at Mount Ruapehu and Lake Taupō.

== Features ==
The field ranges from Lake Pupuke and Rangitoto Island in the north to Matukutururu (Wiri Mountain) in the south, and from Mount Albert in the west to Pigeon Mountain in the east.

The first vent erupted at Pupuke 193,200 ± 2,800 years ago. The most recent eruption (about 600 years ago and within historical memory of the local Māori) was of Rangitoto, an island shield volcano just east of the city, erupting 0.7 cubic kilometres of lava. The last volcano to erupt was much bigger than all others, with Rangitoto making up 41 per cent of the field's entire volume of erupted material with characteristics as to slope and symmetry around the eruptive vents seen in basaltic shield volcanoes as might be expected in a volcano, that may have buried other volcanoes, and now known to have a 1000-year odd eruptive history. The field's other volcanoes are relatively small, with most less than 150 metres (490 ft) in height.

Lake Pupuke, on the North Shore near Takapuna, is a volcanic explosion crater. A few similar craters such as Ōrākei Basin are open to the sea.

The field has produced voluminous lava flows that cover much of the Auckland isthmus. One of the longest runs from Mt Saint John northward, almost crossing the Waitematā Harbour to form Meola Reef. More than 50 lava tubes and other lava caves have been discovered, including the 290-metre (950 ft)-long Wiri Lava Cave. There can be an association with lava caves and the formation of rootless cones due to their mechanism of formation and a rootless cone was suggested to exist at Wiri being Matukutūreia. This may not be quite the case even though at least one steam only driven eruption occurred close to Matukutūreia. The second-longest individual cave in the Auckland field, some 270 metres (890 ft) in total length, is the Cave of a Thousand Press-ups to the east of Maungakiekie/One Tree Hill. Two impressive depressions caused by lava cave collapses are the Puka Street Grotto and the nearby Hochstetter Pond, also known as Grotto Street Pond, in Onehunga.

For most of the 200,000 years that the field has been erupting, the planet has been in glacial periods (ice ages) where sea levels were much lower due to water being locked up as ice, and the Waitemata and Manukau Harbours were dry land. All the volcanoes probably erupted on land except for Rangitoto, which erupted during the current interglacial (warmer) period.

=== Tectonic relationships ===
Map of faults and Quaternary volcanoes in the Auckland region. To show well the volcanoes in relation to fault lines you have to click on the map to enlarge and then zoom and pan. This also enables mouse over of the volcano and fault names. Definite active faults are shown in red. Well characterised inactive fault segments are in dark grey and other faults are shown in grey. A number of faults characterised by sea floor studies off the west coast of North Island are not shown. The type of volcanic eruption (some are composite) is indicated by basalt shield type eruption (black), scoria cone (red), or phreatomagmatic eruptions tuff ring (red-brown) and maar (purple). Volcanoes from both the Auckland volcanic field and South Auckland volcanic field are displayed. Miocene volcanoes are not shown.

The Auckland region lies within the Australian Plate, about 400 kilometres (250 mi) west of its plate boundary with the Pacific Plate. The volcanoes are located south of a geological region called the Northland Allochthon, and with the northern volcanoes located over early Miocene sedimentary deposits of the Waitematā Group of rocks and the southern volcanoes over post Miocene sediments. A large proportion of the volcanoes in the field, particularly those with cone structures, lie within 500 metres (1,600 ft) of inferred or known faults, with the qualification that these are inactive historic faults and unlike in many other volcanic fields it is rare for volcanoes to be actually on the fault line. The structure of these Auckland regional faults and the resulting fault blocks is complex but like the volcanic field their locations can be postulated to be related to gravitational variations and where the Stokes Magnetic Anomaly passes through this section of the North Island. The field is part of the Auckland Volcanic Province which comprises four volcanic fields with intra-plate basaltic volcanism starting in the south, at Okete, near Raglan in late Pliocene times (2.7–1.8 Ma). Activity has since moved north through the Ngatutura, South Auckland and Auckland fields since then.

== Human context ==
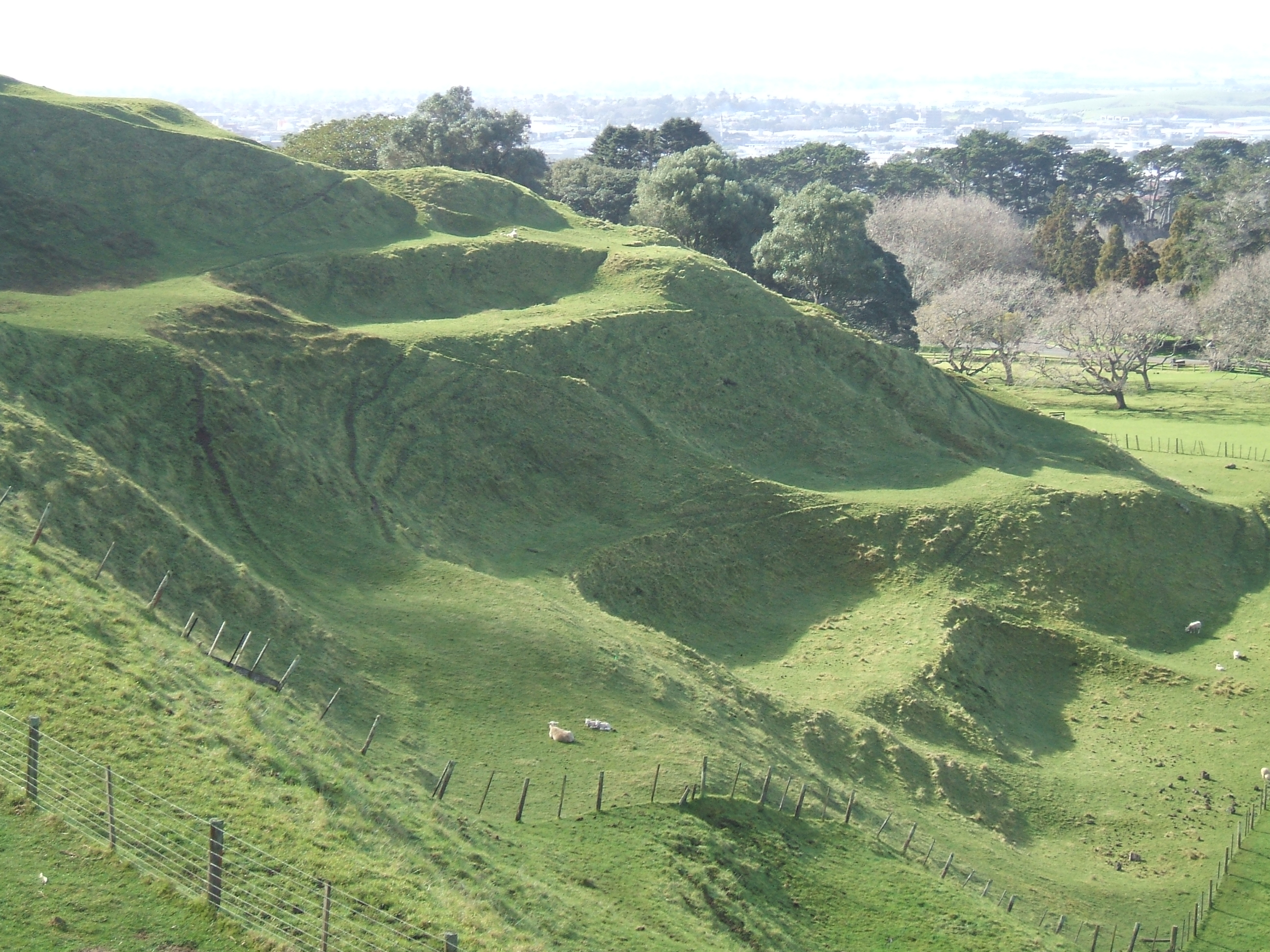
Terraces carved by Māori into the slopes of Maungakiekie / One Tree Hill

=== Mythology ===
Tāmaki Māori myths describe the creation of the volcanic field as a creation of Mataaho (the guardian of the earth's secrets) and his brother Rūaumoko (the god of earthquakes and volcanoes), made as punishment against a tribe of patupaiarehe, supernatural beings living in the Waitākere Ranges, who used deadly magic from the earth to defeat a war party of patupaiarehe from the Hunua Ranges. In some traditions, the fire goddess Mahuika creates the volcanic field as a way to warm Mataaho, after his wife leaves and takes his clothing. Because of their close association to Mataaho, the volcanic features can be collectively referred to as Nga Maunga a Mataaho ("The Mountains of Mataaho"), or Ngā Huinga-a-Mataaho ("the gathered volcanoes of Mataaho"). Many of the volcanic features of Māngere can be referred to as Nga Tapuwae a Mataoho ("The Sacred Footprints of Mataoho"), including Māngere Lagoon, Waitomokia, Crater Hill, Kohuora, Pukaki Lagoon and Robertson Hill. Many of the Māori language names of volcanic features in the field refer to Mataaho by name, including Te Pane o Mataaho (Māngere Mountain), Te Tapuwae a Mataoho (Robertson Hill) and Te Kapua Kai o Mataoho (the crater of Maungawhau / Mount Eden).

=== Usage ===
Many of the maunga (mountains) were occupied by substantial Māori pā (fortifications) before Pākehā settlement, and many terraces and other archeological remnants are still visible. Many of the cones have been levelled or strongly altered, in small part due to the historical Māori use, but mostly through relatively recent quarrying of construction materials (especially scoria). However many of the remaining volcanoes are now preserved as landmarks and parks.

The warmer northern sides of the mountains were also popular among early Pākehā settlers for housing. In the 1880s, Takarunga / Mount Victoria and Maungauika / North Head were developed as military installations due to fears of a Russian invasion. The cones are also protected by a 1915 law, the Reserves and Other Lands Disposal and Public Bodies Empowering Act 1915, which was passed due to early concern that the distinctive landscape was being eroded, especially by quarrying. While often ignored until the late 20th century, it has amongst other things minimised severe changes to Mount Roskill proposed by Transit New Zealand for the Southwestern Motorway.

In March 2007, New Zealand submitted the volcanic field, with several specifically named features, as a World Heritage Site candidate based on its unique combination of natural and cultural features. At that time, only 2 per cent of more than 800 World Heritage Sites worldwide were in this "mixed" category.

For most of Auckland's post-1840 history, the mountains have been administered variously by the New Zealand Crown, the Auckland Council (or its former bodies including the Auckland City Council and Manukau City Council) or the Department of Conservation.

In the 2014 Treaty of Waitangi settlement between the Crown and the Ngā Mana Whenua o Tāmaki Makaurau collective of 13 Auckland iwi and hapū (also known as the Tāmaki Collective), ownership of the 14 Tūpuna Maunga (ancestral mountains) of Tāmaki Makaurau / Auckland, was vested to the collective. The legislation specified that the land be held in trust "for the common benefit of Ngā Mana Whenua o Tāmaki Makaurau and the other people of Auckland". The Tūpuna Maunga o Tāmaki Makaurau Authority or Tūpuna Maunga Authority (TMA) is the co-governance organisation established to administer the 14 Tūpuna Maunga. Auckland Council manages the Tūpuna Maunga under the direction of the TMA.

=== Dangers ===
Since the field is not extinct, new volcanic events may occur at any time, though the usual period between events is, on average, somewhere between hundreds to thousands of years. There has been at least one eruption in every 2,500 years over the last 50,000 years. However, the effects of such an event—especially a full-scale eruption—would be substantial, ranging from pyroclastic surges to earthquakes, lava bombs, ash falls, and the venting volcanic gas, as well as lava flows. These effects might continue for several months, potentially causing substantial destruction and disruption, ranging from the burial of substantial tracts of residential or commercial property, to the mid-to-long-term closures of major parts of the country's infrastructure such as the Port of Auckland, the State Highway network, or the Auckland Airport. It is possible that several volcanoes could erupt simultaneously. There is strong evidence that eight erupted within a span of 3000 years or so, between 31,000 and 28,000 years ago.

Most eruptive events in the field have been small volume, very constrained in time, typically involving less than 0.005 km^{3} (0.0012 cu mi) of magma making its way to the surface. However the same amount of magma can have an order of magnitude different impact. An underwater eruption which is more likely to be explosive resulted in the formation of the 0.7 km (0.43 mi) wide Ōrākei crater that destroyed an area of 3 km^{3} (0.72 cu mi) by crater formation and base surge impact. This contrasts with the about 0.5 km (0.31 mi) diameter cone produced by the same amount of upwelling magma that might be expected to destroy an area of 0.3 km^{3} (0.072 cu mi) if there is no ground water interaction. Modelling has suggested that the next eruption in the volcanic field is likely to be associated with water and in the area extending from the central city to its north and northeast suburbs surrounding and including the Waitemata Harbour. Within New Zealand the volcanic hazard of the field is graded below that of Taupō Volcanic Zone volcano's but is likely to be perceived by the population affected as a greater potential nuisance if it occurs.

Various operative structures, plans and systems have been set up to prepare responses to volcanic activity within the urban areas, mainly coordinated in the Auckland Volcanic Field Contingency Plan of the Auckland Regional Council, which provides a framework for interaction of civil defence and emergency services during an eruption. Auckland also has a seismic monitoring network comprising six seismometers—including one 250 metres (820 ft) deep at Riverhead—and three repeaters within the region that will detect the small tremors likely to precede any volcanic activity. This is likely to give between a few hours and several days' warning of an impending eruption, and its approximate location.

Auckland War Memorial Museum, itself built on the crater rim of Pukekawa, has an exhibition on the field, including the "Puia Street multi-sensory visitor experience", which simulates a grandstand view of an eruption in Auckland.

== List of volcanoes ==
The volcanoes within the field are:

| Volcanoes | Age (thousand years) | Height | Location (Coordinates) | Refs | Images |
|---|---|---|---|---|---|
| Albert Park Volcano | 145.0 ± 4.0 | Unclear | 36.8486°S 174.7673°E | | Albert Park Volcano surrounded by city buildings |
| Ash Hill | 31.8 ± 0.4 | 30 metres (98 ft) | 37.002754°S 174.867545°E | | |
| Boggust Park Crater | 130+ | 14 metres (46 ft) | 36.955413°S 174.813552°E | | Oblique aerial view of Boggust Park explosion crater from the north, 2018. |
| Cemetery Crater | Undated | 33 metres (108 ft) | 36.989828°S 174.841082°E | | Site of Cemetery Crater beneath houses in 2018. |
| Crater Hill | 30.4 ± 0.8 | | 36.986546°S 174.827135°E | | Crater Hill volcano in 2009 Crater Hill volcano |
| Grafton Volcano | 106.5 | 82 metres (269 ft) | 36.858440°S 174.763624°E | | Site of Grafton explosion crater and tuff ring in 2018, completely covered in houses and medical School except for Outhwaite Park |
| Hampton Park | 57.0 ± 32.0 | 43 metres (141 ft) | 36.950925°S 174.89544°E | | Hampton Park Volcano from north, 2009 |
| Kohuora | 33.7 ± 2.4 | 37 metres (121 ft) | 36.97873°S 174.842691°E | | Kohuora Explosion Crater from northwest, 2009 |
| Māngere Lagoon | 59.5 | 20 metres (66 ft) | 36.95702°S 174.77763°E | | Māngere Lagoon |
| Matanginui / Green Mount | 19.6 ± 6.6 | 78 metres (256 ft) | 36.939911°S 174.898267°E | | Rubbish heap replaces quarried away Matanginui / Green Mountain, 2009 |
| Matukutūreia / McLaughlins Mountain | 48.0 ± 3.0 | 73 metres (240 ft) | 37°00′49″S 174°50′46″E | | Matukutūreia, 2018 |
| Matukutūruru / Wiri Mountain | 30.1–31.0 | 80 metres (260 ft) (quarried) | 37°00′26″S 174°51′30″E | | Remnants of Matukutūruru, 2018 |
| Maungakiekie / One Tree Hill | 67.0 ± 12.0 | 182 metres (597 ft) | 36°54′0″S 174°46′59″E | | Maungakiekie / One Tree Hill from the northwest, 2018 Maungakiekie / One Tree Hill and its obelisk |
| Maungarahiri / Little Rangitoto | 24.6 ± 0.6 | 75 metres (246 ft) | 36.875407°S 174.809636°E | | Maungarahiri / Little Rangitoto from the north over Benson Rd shops, 2019 |
| Maungarei / Mount Wellington | 10.0 ± 1.0 | 135 metres (443 ft) | 36°53′35″S 174°50′47.6″E | | Maungarei / Mount Wellington, 2018 Maungarei / Mount Wellington from the quarried remnants of Te Tauoma |
| Maungataketake / Elletts Mountain | 88.9 ± 4.8 | 76 metres (249 ft) | 36.994635°S 174.747548°E | | Quarried out site of Maungataketake Volcano, 2018 |
| Maungauika / North Head | 87.5 ± 15.2 | 50 metres (160 ft) | 36.827751°S 174.81205°E | | Maungauika / North Head Volcano, 2018 Maungauika / North Head (center) and Takarunga / Mount Victoria (left) scoria cones |
| Maungawhau / Mount Eden | 28.0 ± 0.6 | 196 metres (643 ft) | 36.877°S 174.764°E | | Maungawhau / Mount Eden, 2018 Crater of Maungawhau / Mount Eden |
| Motukorea / Browns Island | 24.4 ± 0.6 | 68 metres (223 ft) | 36.8306°S 174.8948°E | | Motukorea / Browns Island, 2009 Motukorea / Browns Island |
| Mount Robertson / Sturges Park | 24.3 ± 0.8 | 78 metres (256 ft) | 36.948477°S 174.841726°E | | Mount Robertson / Sturges Park from the north, 2018 |
| Ōhinerau / Mount Hobson | 34.2 ± 1.8 | 143 metres (469 ft) | 36.877814°S 174.786156°E | | Ōhinerau / Mount Hobson |
| Ohuiarangi / Pigeon Mountain | 23.4 ± 0.8 | 55 metres (180 ft) | 36.888846°S 174.903116°E | | Ohuiarangi / Pigeon Mt, 2009 |
| Ōrākei Basin | 126.0 ± 6.0 | 54 metres (177 ft) | 36.867124°S 174.81308°E | | Ōrākei Basin, 2018 |
| Ōtāhuhu / Mount Richmond | 30.2 ± 4.2 | 50 metres (160 ft) | 36°55′57″S 174°50′22″E | | Ōtāhuhu / Mt Richmond, 2018 |
| Ōtuataua | 24.2 ± 1.8 | 64 metres (210 ft) | 36°59′10″S 174°45′15″E | | Ōtuataua volcanic cone and lava flow field |
| Ōwairaka / Te Ahi-kā-a-Rakataura / Mount Albert | 119.2 ± 5.6 | 135 metres (443 ft) | 36.890475°S 174.720097°E | | Ōwairaka / Mt Albert, 2009 |
| Puhinui Craters | Undated | 24 metres (79 ft) | 37°00′53″S 174°49′59″E | | Puhinui Craters, 2018 |
| Pūkaki Lagoon | 45+ | 37 metres (121 ft) | 36.982998°S 174.810226°E | | Pūkaki explosion crater and tuff ring, 2018 |
| Pukeiti | 23.7 | 30 metres (98 ft) | 36.983756°S 174.757183°E | | Pukeiti volcano, 2009 |
| Pukekawa / Auckland Domain | 106.0 ± 8.0 | 77 metres (253 ft) | 36.859158°S 174.775808°E | | Pukekawa / Auckland Domain, 2018 Sports grounds within Pukekawa volcano |
| Pukewīwī / Puketāpapa / Mount Roskill | 105.3 ± 6.2 | 110 metres (360 ft) | 36.912286°S 174.737371°E | | Pukewīwī / Puketāpapa / Mt Roskill, 2018 |
| Pukewairiki | 130+ | 35 metres (115 ft) | 36.944078°S 174.865887°E | | Pukewairiki explosion crater and tuff ring, 2009 |
| Pupuke | 193.2 ± 5.6 | 34 metres (112 ft) | 36.780115°S 174.766184°E | | Pupuke crater from space in 2006 |
| Rangitoto Island | 0.62 (first eruption) | 260 metres (850 ft) | 36.786742°S 174.860115°E | | Rangitoto Island on the horizon |
| Rarotonga / Mount Smart | 20.1 ± 0.2 | 87 metres (285 ft) (quarried) | 36°55′6″S 174°48′45″E | | The quarried out cone of Rarotonga / Mt Smart is now Mt Smart Stadium, 2018 |
| Styaks Swamp | 19.1 | 16 metres (52 ft) | 36.936138°S 174.900155°E | | Site of Styaks Swamp buried beneath buildings and road, 2009 |
| Takaroro / Mount Cambria | 42.3 ± 22.0 | 30 metres (98 ft) (quarried) | 36.824444°S 174.801933°E | | Site of quarried away Takaroro / Mt Cambria, 2018 |
| Takarunga / Mount Victoria | 34.8 ± 4.0 | 87 metres (285 ft) | 36.8266°S 174.7990°E | | Takarunga / Mount Victoria, 2018 |
| Taurere / Taylors Hill | 30.2 ± 0.2 | 56 metres (184 ft) | 36.864223°S 174.869943°E | | Taurere / Taylors Hill, 1994 |
| Te Apunga-o-Tainui / McLennan Hills | 41.3 ± 2.4 | 45 metres (148 ft) (quarried) | 36.929208°S 174.846468°E | | Te Apunga-o-Tainui / McLennan Hills, Painting by G.H. Cooper, 1861, Auckland Art Gallery |
| Te Hopua-a-Rangi / Gloucester Park | 31.0 | 12 metres (39 ft) | 36.9295°S 174.784734°E | | Te Hopua, 2018 |
| Te Kopua Kai-a-Hiku / Panmure Basin | 25.2 ± 1.8 | 35 metres (115 ft) | 36.90495°S 174.849343°E | | Panmure Basin, 2009 Te Kopua Kai-a-Hiku / Panmure Basin with Maungarei / Mount Wellington behind |
| Te Kopua-o-Matakamokamo / Tank Farm / Tuff Crater | 181.0 ± 2.0 | 46 metres (151 ft) | 36.8020°S 174.7533°E | | Te Kopua-o-Matokamokamo / Tank Farm, 2009 |
| Onepoto | 187.6 | 46 metres (151 ft) | 36.80818°S 174.75085°E | | Onepoto explosion crater and tuff ring, 2009 |
| Te Kōpuke / Tītīkōpuke / Mount St John | 75.3 ± 3.4 | 126 metres (413 ft) | 36.883431°S 174.780196°E | | Te Kōpuke / Tītīkōpuke / Mount St John, 2009 Crater of Te Kōpuke / Tītīkōpuke / Mount St John |
| Te Motu-a-Hiaroa / Puketutu | 29.8 ± 4.4 | 65 metres (213 ft) | 36.965186°S 174.747248°E | | Te Motu-a-Hiaroa / Puketutu Island Volcano, 2018 |
| Te Pane-o-Mataaho / Māngere Mountain | 59.0 ± 20.0 | 106 metres (348 ft) | 36.9496°S 174.7831°E | | Te Pane-o-Mataaho / Māngere Mountain, 2009 Te Pane-o-Mataaho / Māngere Mountain from the east |
| Te Pou Hawaiki | 28.0+ | 95 metres (312 ft) (quarried) | 36.88247°S 174.766726°E | | Site of Te Pou Hawaiki is now a three-storey concrete carpark building, 2018 |
| Te Puke ō Tara / Otara Hill | 56.5 | 89 metres (292 ft) (quarried) | 36.947105°S 174.898363°E | | The buildings in the middle of the photo are on the site of quarried away Te Puke ō Tara / Otara Hill volcano, 2009 |
| Te Tātua-a-Riukiuta / Three Kings | 31.0 ± 1.8 | 133 metres (436 ft) | 36.902926°S 174.754651°E | | The entire crater and tuff ring of Te Tātua-a-Riukiuta / Three Kings Quarrying has removed two of the Tātua-a-Riukiuta / Three Kings |
| Te Tauoma / Purchas Hill | 10.9 ± 0.2 | 50 metres (160 ft) (quarried) | 36.887138°S 174.847476°E | | The site of Te Tauoma / Purchas Hill, 2018 |
| Waitomokia / Mt Gabriel | 20.3 ± 0.2 | 22 metres (72 ft) (quarried) | 36.976981°S 174.770336°E | | Waitomokia explosion crater and tuff ring, 2018 |
| Whakamuhu / Saint Heliers / Glover Park – see Achilles Point | 161.0 ± 36.0 | 65 metres (213 ft) | 36.846911°S 174.867662°E | | Whakamuhu / St Heliers Volcano, 2009 The Glover Park sports ground at lower right of this photo is situated within the Whakamuhu tuff ring. Over the water in the distance on the right is the scoria cone of Maungauika / North Head and in the left middle is the tuff crater filled in by the sea of Ōrākei Basin. Beyond Ōrākei Basin in the middle distance are several vegetation covered scoria cones. |

== See also ==
- Geology of the Auckland Region
- List of volcanoes in New Zealand
- Volcanism in New Zealand
- Stratigraphy of New Zealand
- South Auckland volcanic field
- List of caves in New Zealand
- List of volcanic fields
