= Ōrākei Basin =

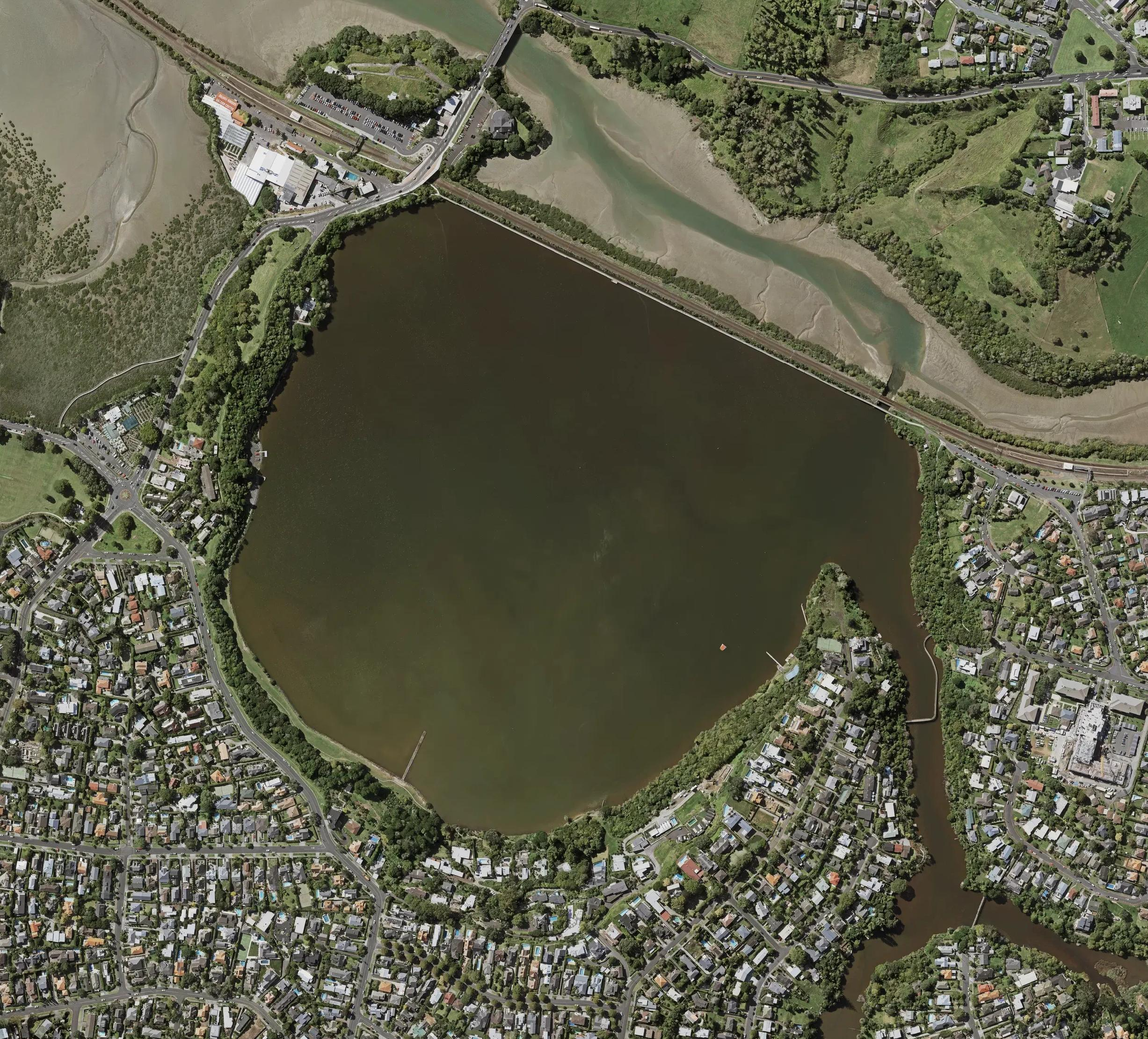
- Aerial view of Ōrākei Basin

- Location within North Island
- Location: Auckland, North Island
- Coordinates: 36.867124°S 174.81308°E
- Type: maar lake
- Primary inflows: Orakei Creek
- Basin countries: New Zealand
- First flooded: 132 ka
- Surface elevation: 0 m (0 ft)

Ōrākei Basin is a tidal basin and one of the extinct volcanoes in the Auckland volcanic field in the North Island of New Zealand. It has an explosion crater around 700 m (2,300 ft) wide, with a surrounding tuff ring. The present basin is slightly larger than the original maar crater. Sediments in the basin provided the first high-resolution palaeo-environmental reconstruction for northern New Zealand of the last 130,000 years. The basin supports recreational water sports activities for the local population.

== Geography ==
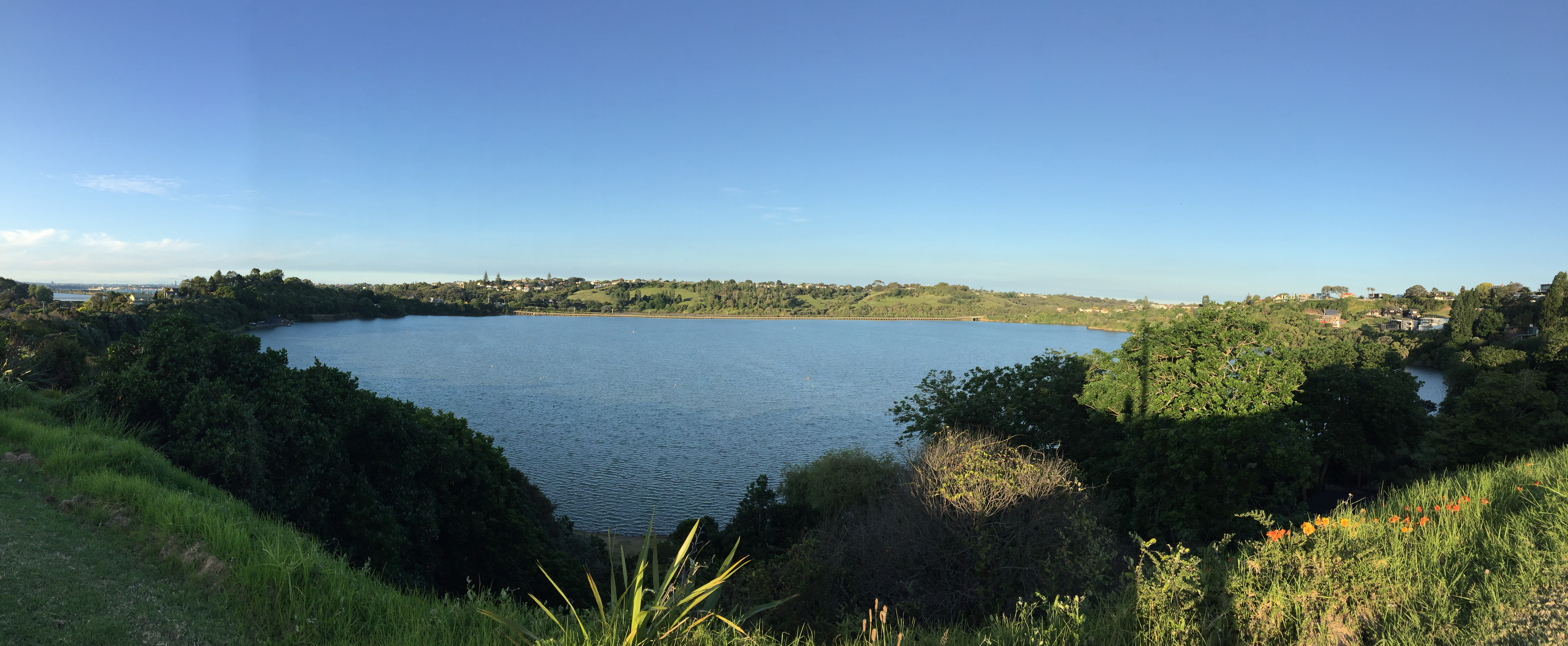
View of Ōrākei Basin looking north-east

Ōrākei Basin is between the suburbs of Remuera and Meadowbank, adjacent to the south shore of the Waitematā Harbour, close to the harbour entrance from the Hauraki Gulf. The western side of the basin has a road that connects the inland suburb of Remuera with the coastal suburbs and the northern side has been formed into a railway embankment which the basin drains into the sea through sluice gates at its north-east corner. The Ōrākei (Te Hori) Creek drains some of the Remuera watershed into the north-east of the basin and the Pourewa Stream presently directly drains to the sea on the northern aspect of the basin.

== Geology ==
Basement is the mudstones and sandstones of the Miocene Waitemata Group East Coast Bays Formation. After eruption of the maar about 132,305 years ago (95%CI 131,430 to 133,180 years ago), it became a freshwater lake that had an overflow stream in the vicinity of present Ōrākei Road bridge. About 2.5×10^{7} m^{3} (8.8×10^{8} cu ft) of the underlying rock was removed upon the explosive formation of the maar. There was for much the period since protection of the lake by a 50 m (160 ft) tuff ring crater wall. The stream inflows to the lake were from the north-east fairly close to its outlet to the north-west, so a central lake sediment core in 2007 confirmed external sedimentation was a minor component of the infill and there was a finely laminated sediment sequence. There was a high sedimentation rate averaging 0.7 mm/a (0.028 in/year).

The eruption tephra volume has been estimated to be 1.3×10^{7} m^{3} (4.6×10^{8} cu ft) with volcanic material making up about 30% of the tuff ring, so that volume of magma ejected was about 3×10^{6} m^{3} (1.1×10^{8} cu ft) About 1×10^{7} m^{3} (3.5×10^{8} cu ft) of basalt has been shown to remain underneath the crater by gravity and magnetic studies. The reason that the lake is larger than the original maar is believed to be because the inner tephra ring deposits may have slumped into the crater.

As sea level rose after the end of the last Ice Age, the lake, which by then had shallowed to a swamp, was breached by the sea about 7050 BCE, and has been a tidal lagoon ever since. This has resulted in the deposition of 18.6 m (61 ft) marine mud over the top of the fresh water deposits. The tuff ring is generally stable except for the north-east side mainly on the northern bank of the Pourewa Stream. The tephra deposits may be over Plio-Pleistocene alluvium here, with a steep slope, and indeed the nearby slopes which are not connected to the overlying volcanics at all have been historically unstable.

=== Chronology ===
An accurate chronology exists over the last glacial cycle between about 9500 and 130,000 BP as a result of two cores taken of lake sediment in 2016. The stratigraphy has been validated against multiple dating standards (radiocarbon ages, tephrochronology, argon-argon-dated eruption ages, luminescence dating (post-infrared–infrared stimulated luminescence, pIR-IRSL), and the Laschamp event. New ages, consistent with other determinations, in all but the case of the Okareka tephra, were obtained for 14 basaltic, 18 andesitic and eight rhyolitic tephra horizons. Tephra studies, including compositional analysis, have defined the major recent Taupō Volcanic Zone eruptions where ash reached Auckland (see timeline on this page which also shows changes in type of lake, its oxygenation and climate with more detail in references). A particularly thick deposit of 300 mm (12 in) is from the Rotoehu tephra from the Rotoiti eruption of the Ōkataina Caldera. This gives a slightly earlier time on analysis of 45,100 ± 3,300 years ago than the usual consensus now of 47,400 ± 3,000 years ago.

== History ==
A railway line (the North Island Main Trunk, branded as the East West Line for suburban services) runs through the north side of the basin. The railway runs along a causeway embankment which was constructed in the 1920s and created a barrier between the Ōrākei Basin and the rest of the Waitematā Harbour. This allows for the basin to be kept full, even during surrounding low tides. The embankment has control gates to allow the scheduled flushing and re-filling of water in the basin. As such, despite being a tidal lagoon, it is popular for watersports.

== Amenities ==
A public walking track circles the basin.
