= Ōtāhuhu / Mount Richmond =

Hill in Auckland, New Zealand

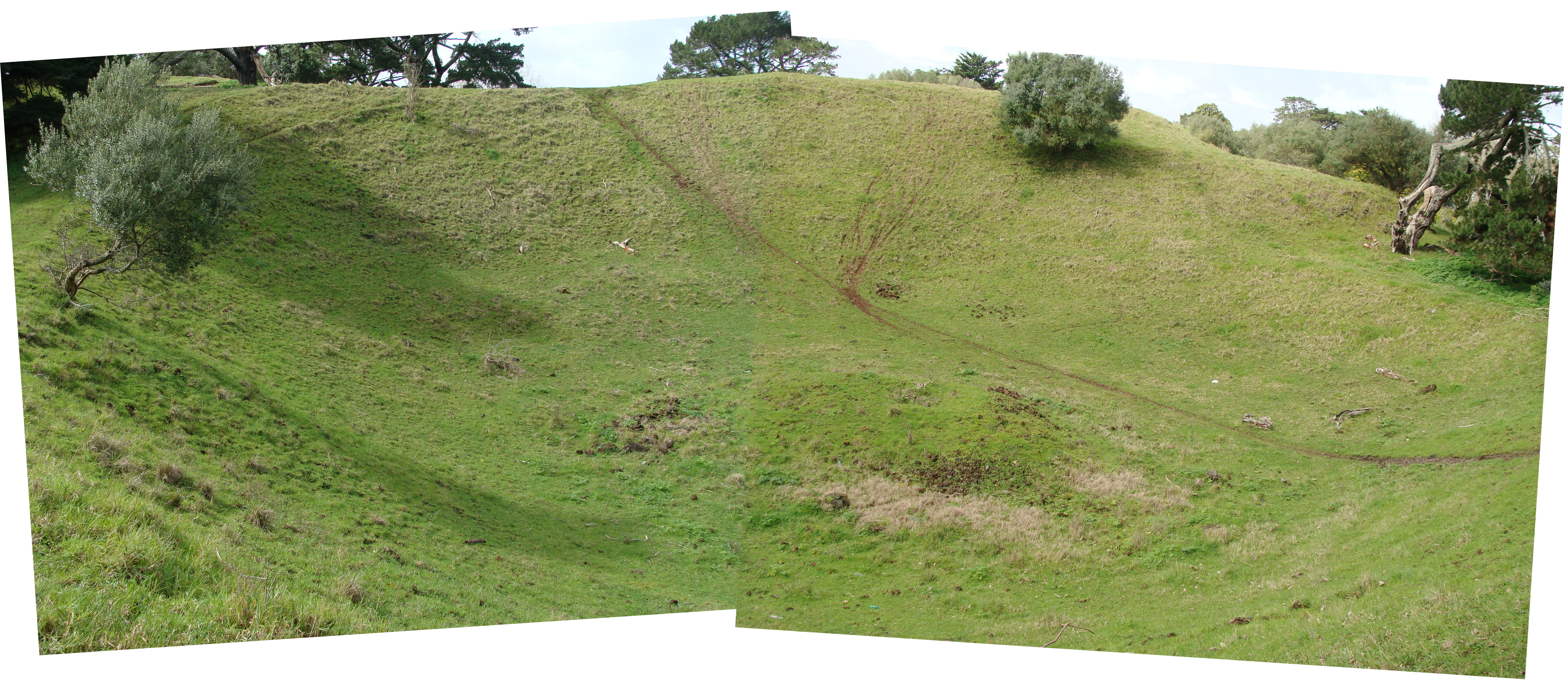
- The northern crater of Ōtāhuhu / Mount Richmond.

Highest point
- Elevation: 48 m (157 ft)
- Coordinates: 36°55′57″S 174°50′22″E

Geography
- Location: North Island, New Zealand

Geology
- Volcanic field: Auckland volcanic field

Ōtāhuhu / Mount Richmond is volcanic peak and Tūpuna Maunga (ancestral mountain) in the Auckland volcanic field. A group of scoria mounds up to 48 m high, it has two 50 m wide craters. It was the site of a pā, and retains some Māori earthworks from that time such as kumara pits and terracing.

In the 2014 Treaty of Waitangi settlement between the Crown and the Ngā Mana Whenua o Tāmaki Makaurau collective of 13 Auckland iwi and hapū (also known as the Tāmaki Collective), ownership of the 14 Tūpuna Maunga of Tāmaki Makaurau / Auckland, was vested to the collective, including the volcano officially named Ōtāhuhu / Mount Richmond. The legislation specified that the land be held in trust "for the common benefit of Ngā Mana Whenua o Tāmaki Makaurau and the other people of Auckland". The Tūpuna Maunga o Tāmaki Makaurau Authority or Tūpuna Maunga Authority (TMA) is the co-governance organisation established to administer the 14 Tūpuna Maunga. Auckland Council manages the Tūpuna Maunga under the direction of the TMA.
