= Hampton Park, New Zealand =

Volcanic cone

Coordinates: 36.950925°S 174.89544°E

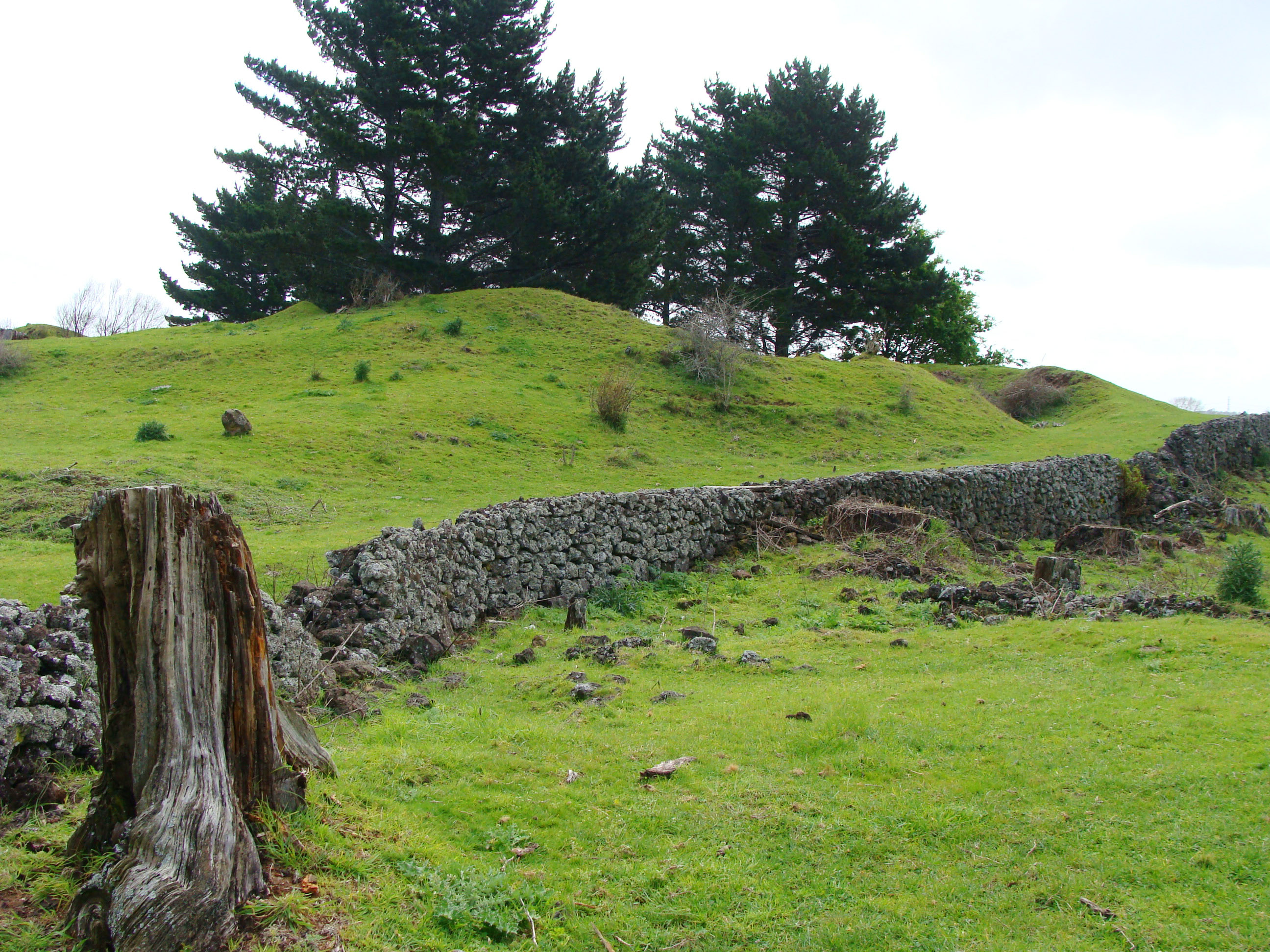
Hampton Park scoria cone.

Hampton Park is one of the volcanoes in the Auckland volcanic field. A small scoria cone reaching 35 metres (114 ft 10 in) above sea level, with a shallow crater around 50 metres (164 ft 1 in) wide, which has been modified by quarrying. The scoria cone sits in the centre of a much larger explosion crater, the eastern arc of the surrounding tuff ring is still present. Stone from the volcano was used to build dry-stone walls and the nearby St John's Church built on the tuff ring crest.
