= East Tāmaki =

- Suburb
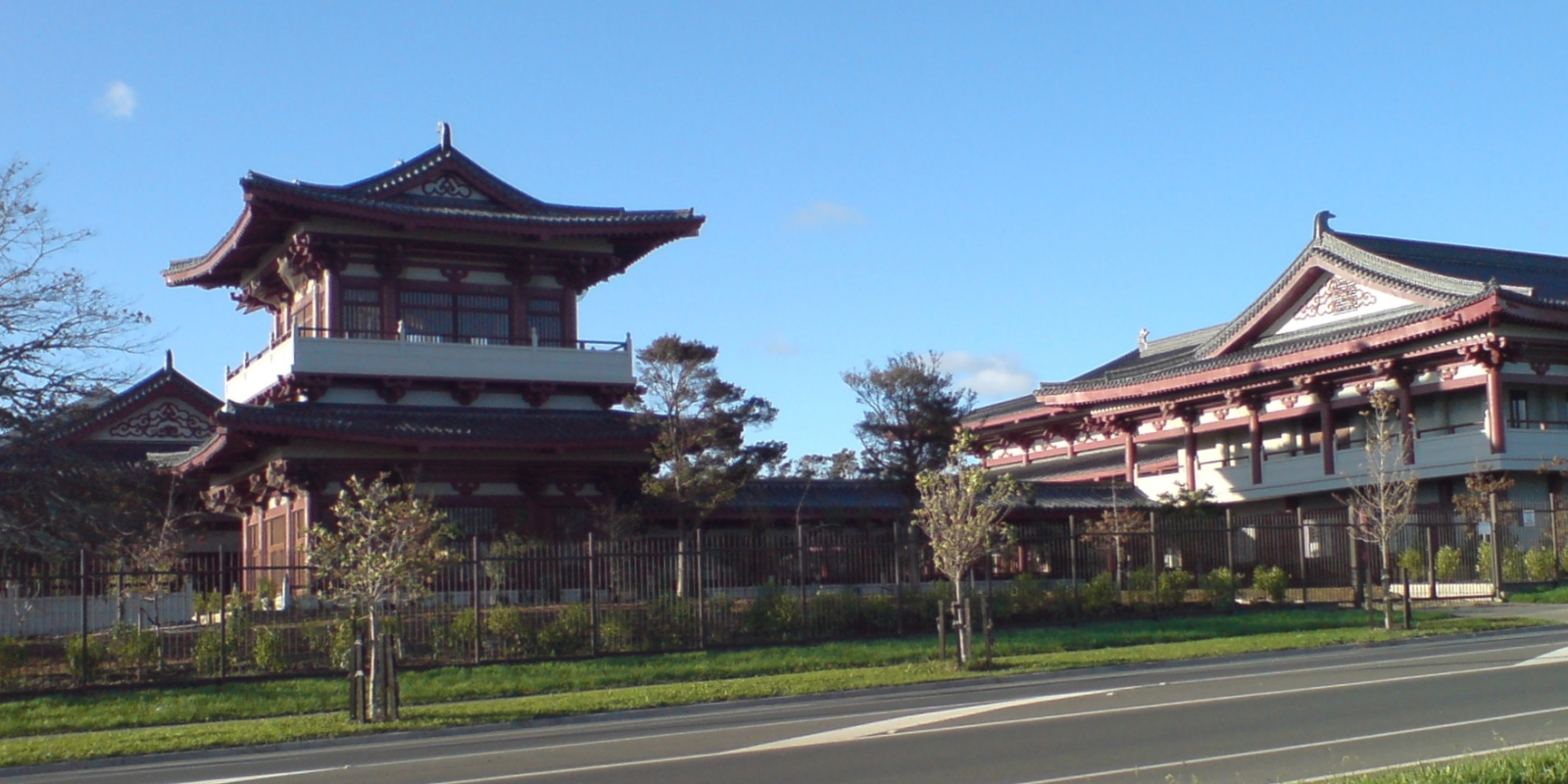
- Fo Guang Shan Temple
- Interactive map of East Tāmaki
- Coordinates: 36°57′S 174°54′E
- Country: New Zealand
- City: Auckland
- Local authority: Auckland Council
- Electoral ward: Howick ward; Manukau ward
- Local board: Howick Local Board; Ōtara-Papatoetoe Local Board

Area
  - Land: 1,228 ha (3,030 acres)

Population (June 2025)
  - Total: 7,840
  - Density: 638/km^{2} (1,650/sq mi)

| Hauraki Gulf | Burswood | Dannemora |
| Hauraki Gulf | East Tāmaki | East Tāmaki Heights |
| Ōtara | Flat Bush | Flat Bush |

East Tāmaki is a suburb of Auckland, New Zealand. It is a largely industrial area adjacent to a rapidly growing population. Prior to the 1960s it was largely a dairy farming area. A landmark is Smales Mountain which in 2010 had the remains of an old Pā, a stone field garden, an early church, and a farm homestead. A newer landmark is the Fo Guang Shan Temple which was the largest Buddhist temple in New Zealand when it opened in 2007.

== History ==
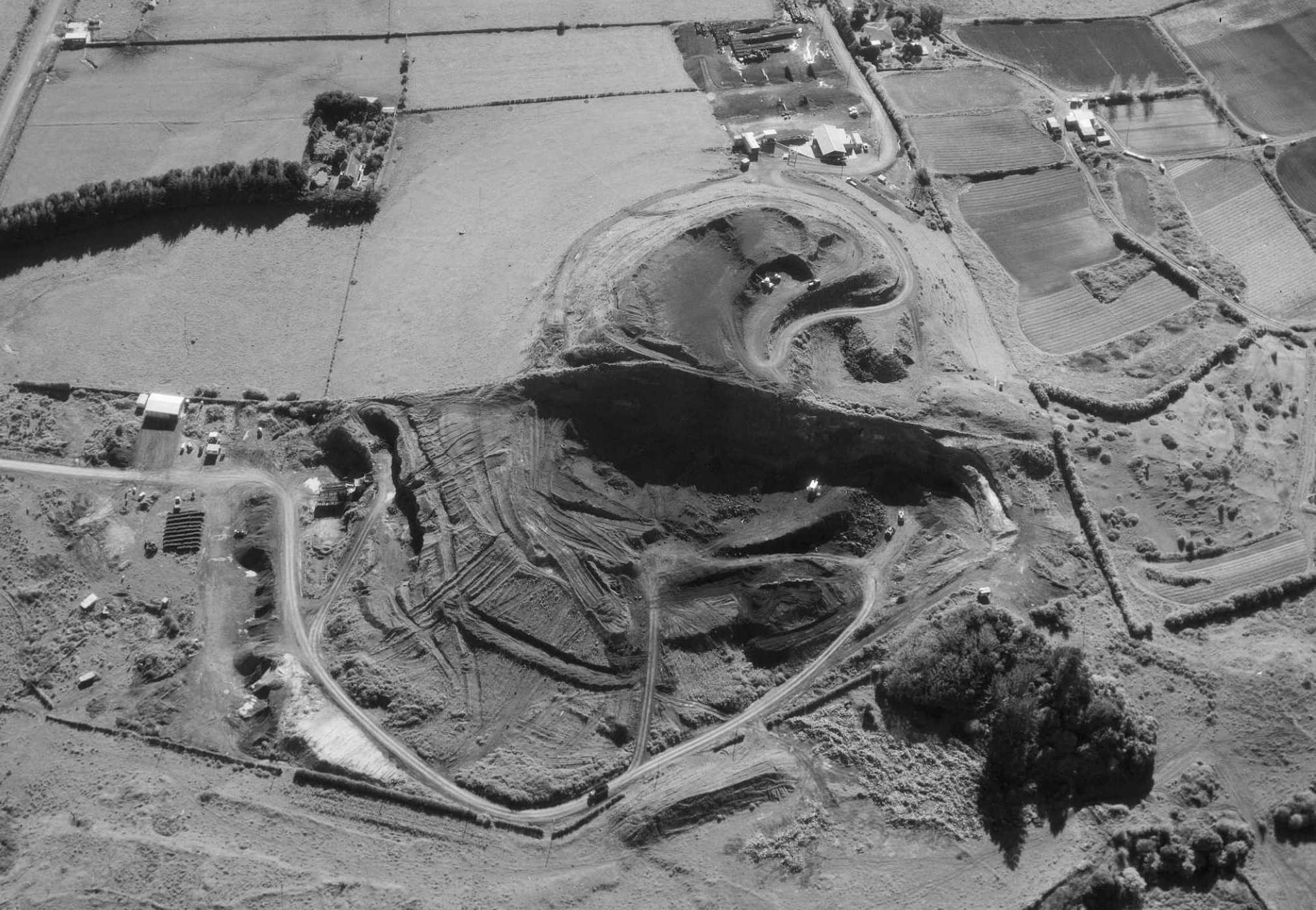
Aerial view of Ōtara Hill in 1958, before quarrying

Te Puke o Tara (literally; 'The Hill of Tara'); known also for a time as Smales Mount. Te Puke o Tara was the home of paramount chief Tara Te Irirangi of Ngāi Tai iwi. One of East Tāmaki's prominent volcanic cones, and prior to European settlement in the area was the site of a scoria cone pā. Like most of Auckland, the East Tāmaki landscape is volcanic in origin and forms a part of what is known as the East Tāmaki volcanic field, with Te Puke o Tara and Mātanginui (Greenmount) having been the dominant cones of Ōtara. A third cone called Highbrook by Pākehā (white/European) settlers and in Māori Te Puke Ariki nui or Te Maunga/mountain of the Great/paramount chief. Mātangi nui was also a pā site, not too far from Puke I Āki Rangi (Point View) which connected the Mangemangeroa Valley, and the areas surrounding all three cones were thought to represent the densest area of pre-European settlement in East Tāmaki, favoured rich volcanic gardening soils and fresh water springs.

The area near Mātanginui (Greenmount) was farmed by the Styaks family. The name recalls Mrs Styaks home at Randalstown in Northern Ireland, which was called Green Bank.

The area was historically known as "Farnsworth".

== Notable places ==
- St Johns Church is located on East Tamaki Road. St Johns was built in 1862 for Gideon Smales. The Church is a stone neo-Gothic building. Upon the death of Smales he donated the Church to be used jointly by both Anglicans and Methodists.
- Hampton Park Estate is located on East Tamaki Road and was a large garden based on the garden at Hampton Court.
- St Paul's Church is located on Chapel Road and was built in 1886.
- Hawthorn Dene is located on Botany Road and was built c.1856.

== Demographics ==
East Tāmaki covers 12.28 km^{2} (4.74 sq mi) and had an estimated population of 7,840 as of June 2025, with a population density of 638 people per km^{2}.

Historical population
| Year | Pop. | ±% p.a. |
|---|---|---|
| 2006 | 4,665 | — |
| 2013 | 7,278 | +6.56% |
| 2018 | 7,335 | +0.16% |
| 2023 | 7,155 | −0.50% |
The 2006 population is for a smaller area of 11.72 km^{2}. Source:

East Tāmaki had a population of 7,155 in the 2023 New Zealand census, a decrease of 180 people (−2.5%) since the 2018 census, and a decrease of 123 people (−1.7%) since the 2013 census. There were 3,480 males, 3,657 females and 18 people of other genders in 2,559 dwellings. 2.4% of people identified as LGBTIQ+. The median age was 39.4 years (compared with 38.1 years nationally). There were 1,218 people (17.0%) aged under 15 years, 1,323 (18.5%) aged 15 to 29, 3,534 (49.4%) aged 30 to 64, and 1,083 (15.1%) aged 65 or older.

People could identify as more than one ethnicity. The results were 33.8% European (Pākehā); 6.1% Māori; 8.8% Pasifika; 52.9% Asian; 5.5% Middle Eastern, Latin American and African New Zealanders (MELAA); and 5.0% other, which includes people giving their ethnicity as "New Zealander". English was spoken by 89.2%, Māori language by 1.0%, Samoan by 2.6%, and other languages by 43.8%. No language could be spoken by 2.3% (e.g. too young to talk). New Zealand Sign Language was known by 0.4%. The percentage of people born overseas was 59.5, compared with 28.8% nationally.

Religious affiliations were 36.0% Christian, 7.6% Hindu, 5.3% Islam, 0.4% Māori religious beliefs, 3.1% Buddhist, 0.1% New Age, and 2.9% other religions. People who answered that they had no religion were 38.8%, and 5.7% of people did not answer the census question.

Of those at least 15 years old, 1,827 (30.8%) people had a bachelor's or higher degree, 2,427 (40.9%) had a post-high school certificate or diploma, and 1,671 (28.1%) people exclusively held high school qualifications. The median income was $46,700, compared with $41,500 nationally. 726 people (12.2%) earned over $100,000 compared to 12.1% nationally. The employment status of those at least 15 was that 3,282 (55.3%) people were employed full-time, 651 (11.0%) were part-time, and 162 (2.7%) were unemployed.

Individual statistical areas
| Name | Area (km^{2}) | Population | Density (per km^{2}) | Dwellings | Median age | Median income |
|---|---|---|---|---|---|---|
| East Tamaki | 7.78 | 270 | 35 | 102 | 36.9 years | $51,200 |
| Huntington Park | 0.44 | 1,965 | 4,466 | 819 | 42.3 years | $40,000 |
| Botany Central | 0.47 | 6 | 13 | – | – | – |
| Redcastle | 0.56 | 2,469 | 4,466 | 786 | 38.1 years | $51,900 |
| Armoy | 0.56 | 2,343 | 4,148 | 798 | 38.9 years | $44,400 |
| Botany Junction | 2.48 | 105 | 42 | 54 | 40.7 years | $54,900 |
| New Zealand | | | | | 38.1 years | $41,500 |

== Governance ==
The East Tamaki Road Board administered East Tamaki from 20 August 1862 to 1923.

The area is under local governance of the Auckland Council.

== Economy ==
East Tāmaki is the largest industrial precinct in Auckland, a manufacturing and distribution hub of 2,000 businesses contributing $3 billion for the New Zealand economy each year, $19 million in rates annually, and 30,000 jobs with projected jobs of 45,000 on completion of Highbrook Business Park. It is consistently one of Auckland's highest performing industrial property areas, and has a higher growth rate than the regional average.
