= Onehunga Harbour Road Bridge =

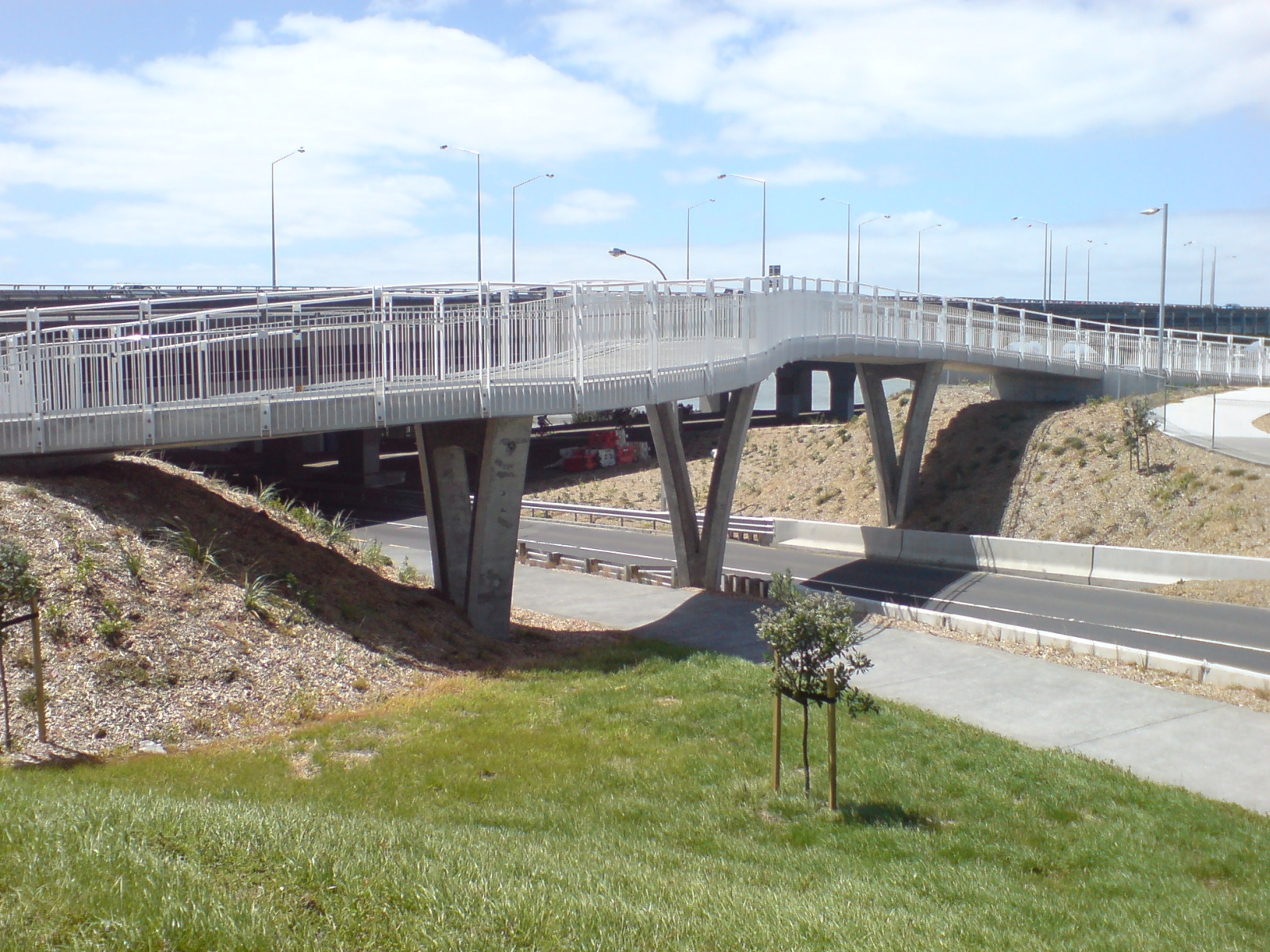
- The bridge seen from the west.
- Coordinates: 36.931485°S 174.78629°E
- Carries: Pedestrians
- Crosses: Onehunga Harbour Road
- Locale: Onehunga, Auckland

Characteristics
- Width: 3.5 metres (11 ft)

History
- Opened: 2 December 2010

Location
- Interactive map of Onehunga Harbour Road Bridge

The Onehunga Harbour Road Bridge is a walking and cycling bridge over Onehunga Harbour Road, a heavily trafficked road at the southwestern edge of Onehunga, New Zealand. The bridge provides easy and safe access from Onehunga to both the Waikaraka Cycleway running west–east, and Old Mangere Bridge to the south, which in turn links over the Mangere Inlet mouth of the Manukau Harbour. The bridge is 3.5m wide, and distinguished by its sweeping, curved structure.

== History ==
The crossing of Onehunga Harbour Road was historically very difficult, as traffic was fast and heavy with over 15,000 vehicles daily (due to the nearby port and the motorway ramps), and sightlines for motorists were also limited by the strong curve of the road in the vicinity.

The design of the bridge was developed in communication with local community groups and the cycling advocate group Cycle Action Auckland, as an ancillary project to the State Highway 20 duplication of the nearby Māngere Bridge motorway bridge. It was completed in 2010, with the construction team having to overcome various issues with difficult ground, some of the piles having to be sunk up to 30m deep through volcanic deposits to local sandstone bedrock. A nearby underpass under SH20, connecting on from the bridge to Onehunga, was also upgraded as part of the project.

== See also ==
- Mangere Bridge (bridges)
- Waikaraka Cycleway
