= Te Tuhi =

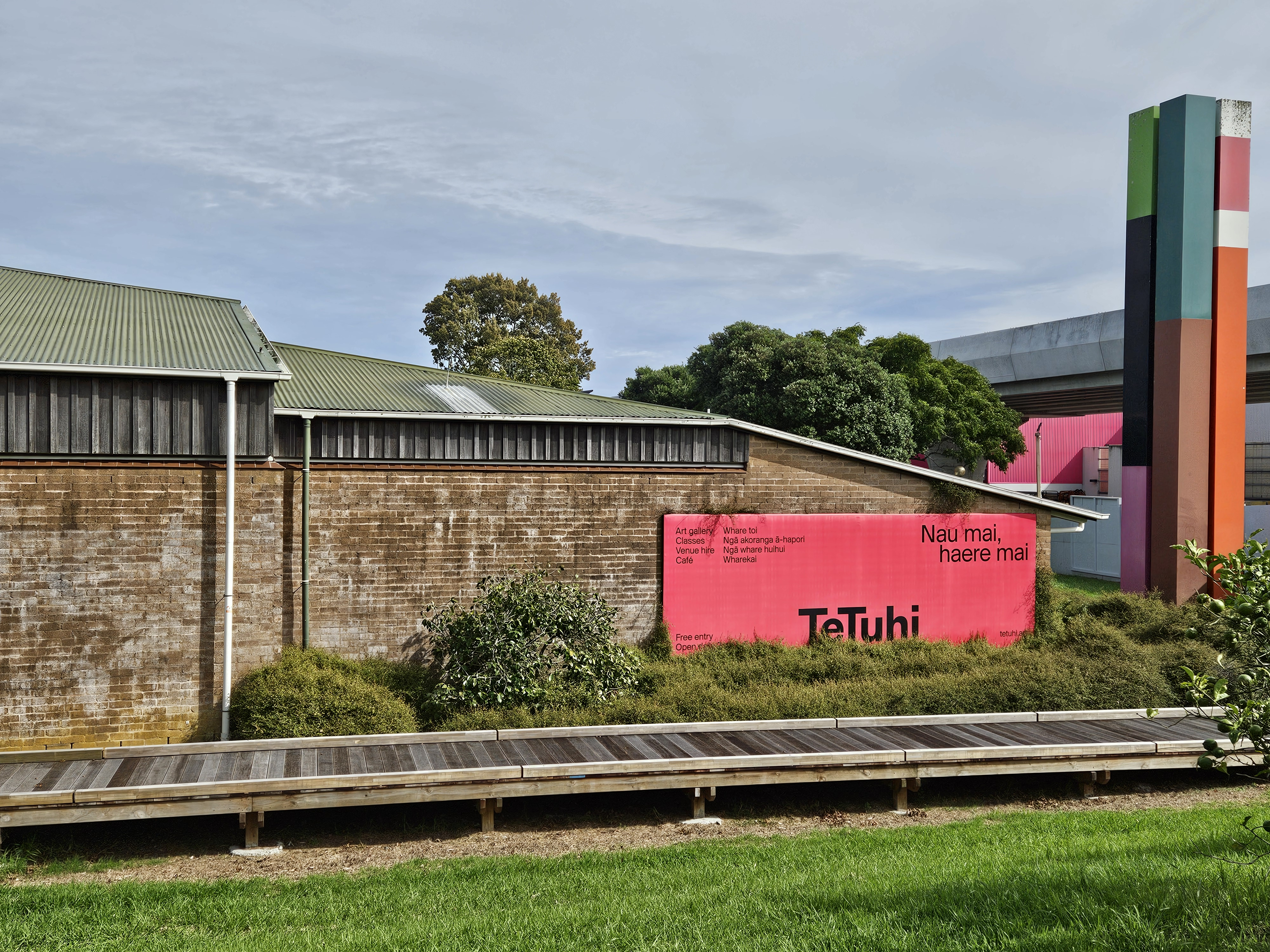
- Interactive map of the Te Tuhi area
- Former names: Te Tuhi Centre for the Arts Te Tuhi - The Mark Te Tuhi Gallery Pakuranga Arts Society

General information
- Location: 21 William Roberts Road, Pakuranga, Auckland, New Zealand
- Coordinates: 36°54′49″S 174°52′24″E

Website
- https://tetuhi.art/

Te Tuhi, formerly known as Te Tuhi Centre for the Arts, Te Tuhi - The Mark, Te Tuhi Gallery and Pakuranga Arts Society is a public contemporary art gallery situated in Pakuranga, Auckland, New Zealand.

Managed by Te Tuhi Contemporary Art Trust and the Contemporary Art Foundation, Te Tuhi presents significant exhibitions and projects by New Zealand and international artists. Te Tuhi also serves as a focal point for the community as an events venue and meeting place for our many users and community groups in Pakuranga.

== History ==
Te Tuhi’s history traced back all the way to the early 1960s with the creation of the Pakuranga Arts Society. Pakuranga Arts Society founded by a group of local women, the first meetings were in a garden shed. It was only in 1975, it was opened as New Zealand’s first purpose-built arts centre.

Te Tuhi was created in a partnership between the Fisher Gallery and the Pakuranga Community and Cultural Centre. The name Te Tuhi was gifted by the local iwi (tribe) Ngai Tai. The name Te Tuhi comes from the legend of the ancestor Manawatere, a Māori voyager and explorer who arrived in the Hauraki Gulf before the arrival of the Tainui. Landing at the beach at what is now Howick's Cockle Bay, he made his tuhi, or mark, on a pōhutukawa tree situated on the foreshore, using karamea, a red ochre. The pōhutukawa tree of the story still stands today, although the mark has since gone. Te Tuhi has been exhibiting in Pakuranga for over 40 years.

== Present ==
Te Tuhi is situated in 13 Reeves Road, Pakuranga, Auckland, right next to Pakuranga Plaza. In 2017, Te Tuhi won Exhibition Excellence - Art section, ServiceIQ New Zealand Museum Awards for the exhibition Share, Cheat, Unite. During the time between 2017 and 2018, Te Tuhi had attracted 175,000 visitors, of which 5500 are students, and hosted 15 exhibitions that featured 20 artists and commissioned 11 artworks. More than 150 workshops and classes, and more than 30 seminars and lectures were hosted in Te Tuhi
