= Māngere Bridge =

Māngere Bridge may refer to the following in Auckland, New Zealand:

- Māngere Bridge (suburb)
- Māngere Bridge (bridges)
