= Panmure Bridge =

Road bridge in Auckland, New Zealand

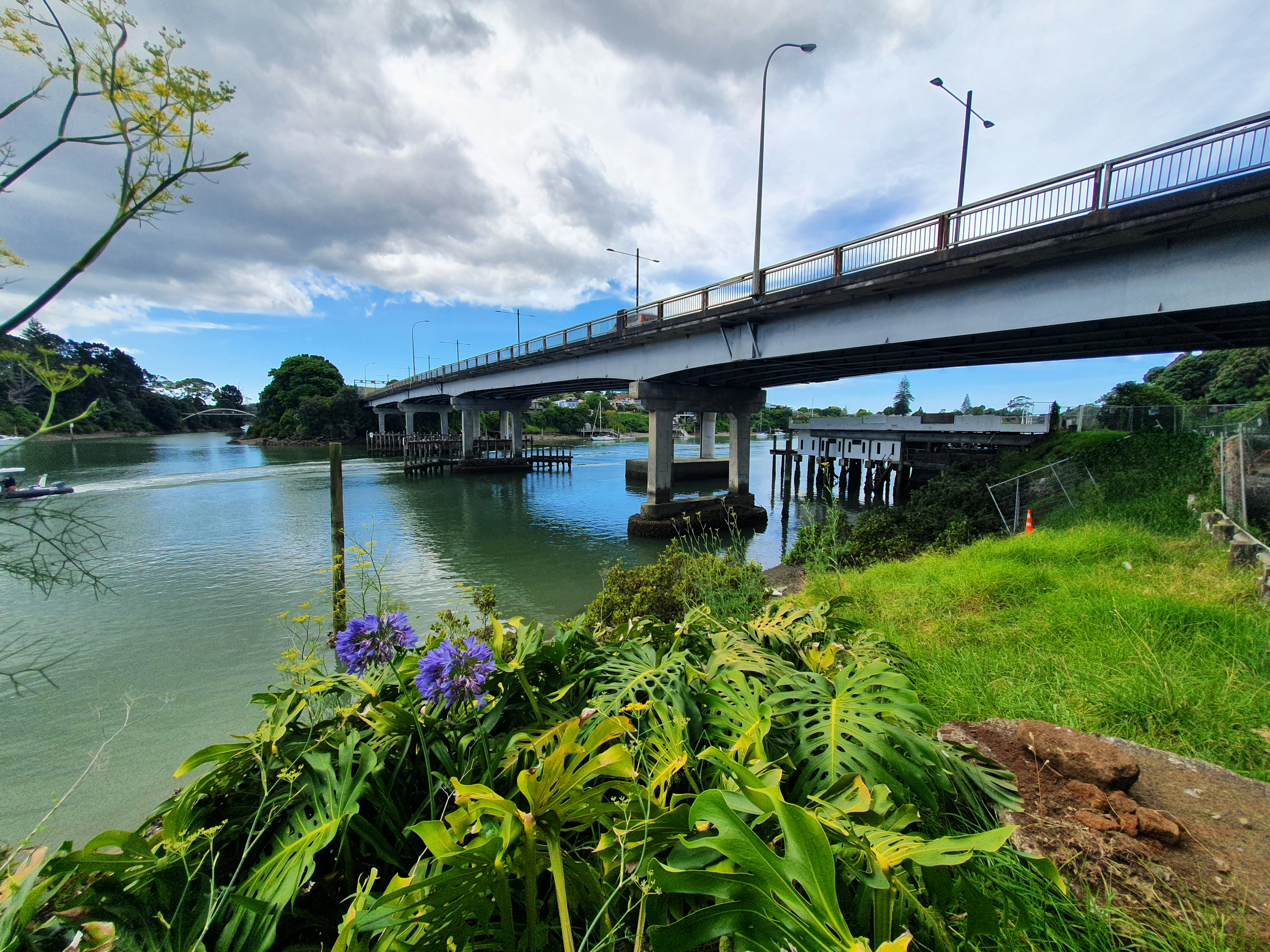
- The 1959 Panmure Bridge
- Coordinates: 36°54′29″S 174°51′29″E
- Crosses: Tāmaki River
- Locale: Auckland, New Zealand
- Maintained by: NZ Transport Agency

The Panmure Bridge, also known as the Tāmaki River Bridge, or Panmure Highway Bridge, is a bridge crossing the Tāmaki River in Auckland, New Zealand, connecting the suburbs of Panmure and Pakuranga. The original 1865 bridge, a wooden and steel structure with a swing span allowing for river traffic, was the first bridge to connect the Auckland isthmus to the surrounding areas of Auckland, predating the opening of the Māngere Bridge in 1875. The swing-span mechanism, found on the eastern banks of the Tāmaki River, is the earliest surviving swing-span mechanism in New Zealand.

The original bridge was replaced with a reinforced concrete bridge in 1916, replaced in 1959 with the current structure. As a part of the Eastern Busway work in 2021, a public and active transport bridge was constructed parallel to the Panmure Bridge.

== Original bridges ==
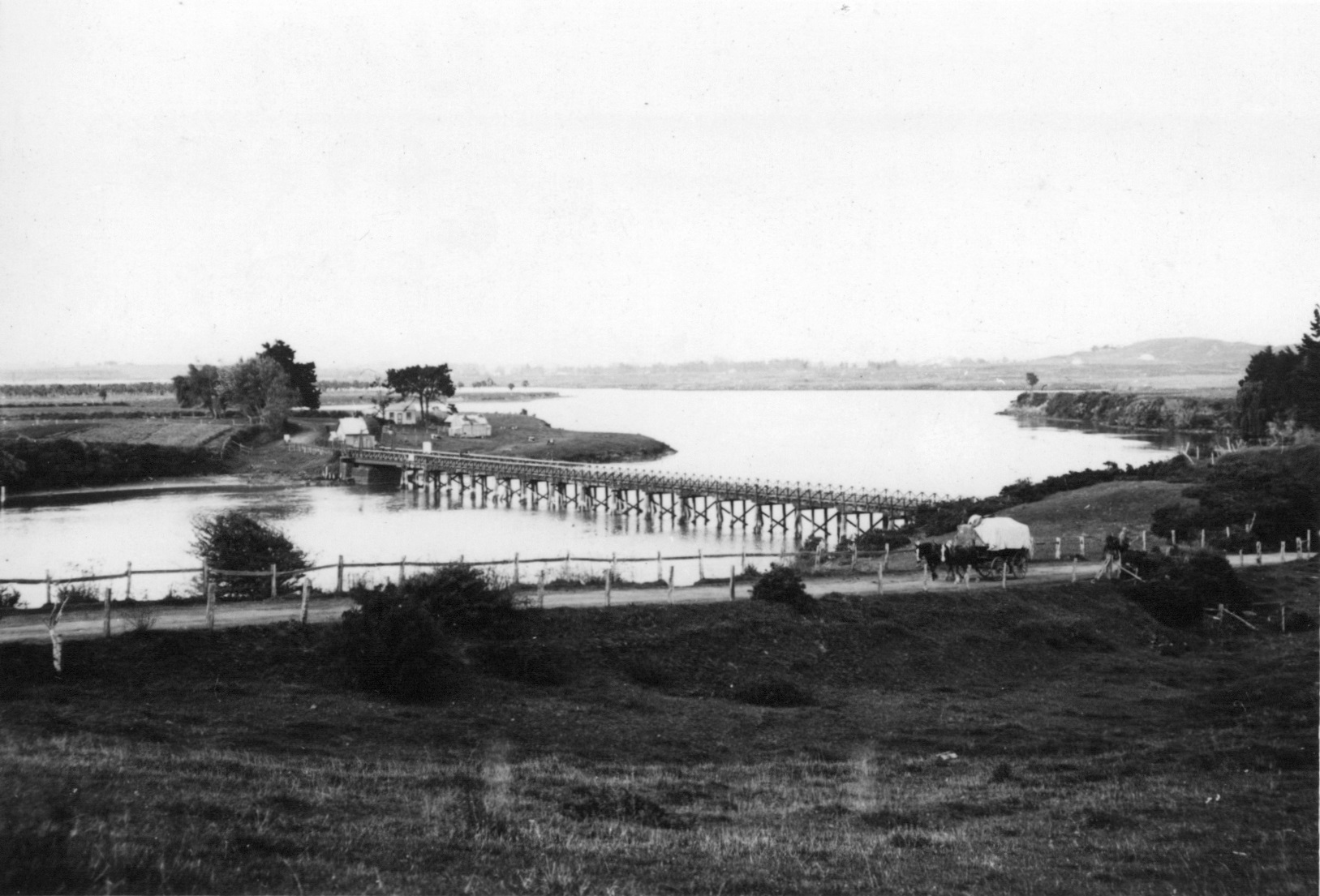
The original bridge, pictured in the 19th Century

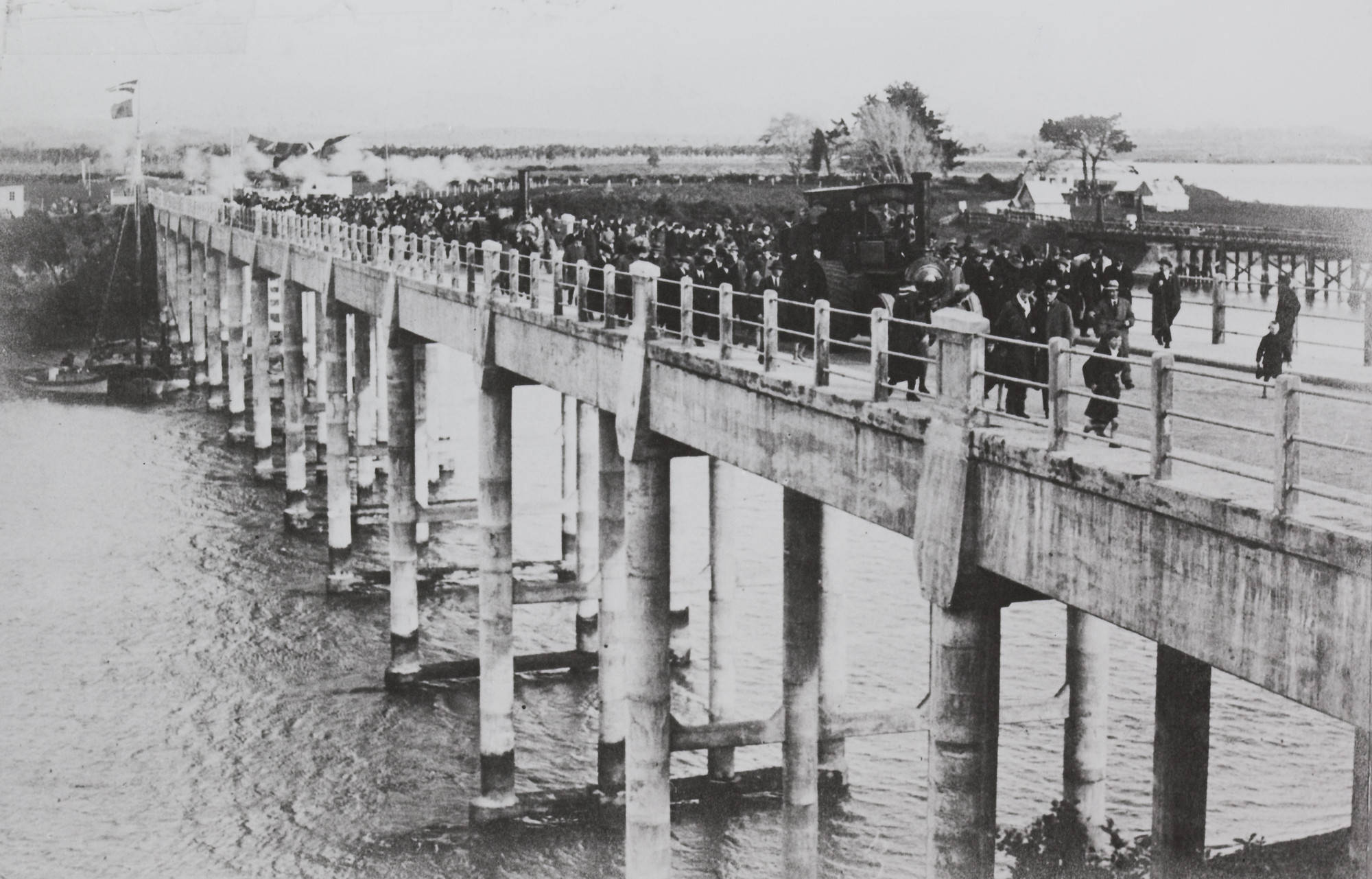
Opening of the second bridge in 1916

Between 1847 and 1852, a number of towns in the Auckland Region were established by Governor George Grey as outposts for the Royal New Zealand Fencible Corps, a collection of retired British and Irish soldiers, to serve as a buffer against a perceived threat of war from the south. These included Panmure on the Auckland isthmus, on the western shores of the Tāmaki River, and Howick, east of the isthmus surrounded by farmland. In 1857, residents petitioned the Auckland Provincial Council for a bridge across the river, to replace the inconsistent ferry services. The Tamaki Bridge Act was passed in February 1864, allowing the province to raise funds for its construction, however financial difficulties delayed the project. Initially designed by William Rickford Collett, the bridge was constructed of steel, basalt rock from Melbourne, tōtara wood piles and a kauri deck. It was 175.6 m (576 ft) long, had a width of 6.4 m (21 ft), and required Muntz metal sheaths for the timber piles to prevent attack by Teredo navalis shipworms. William Weaver, the Engineer-in-Chief to Auckland Province, created a scale-model of the design, which he showcased at the 1865 New Zealand Exhibition.

Work began in October 1864, however issues involving the depth of the river bed meant that repairs on the Muntz metal sheaths were needed to be undertaken. A specialist diving team from Cape Colony worked underwater using Heinke diving suits, a new technique that had been recently used in the construction of the second Westminster Bridge. The bridge was formally opened by Auckland Province superintendent Robert Graham in October 1865, in a ceremony where he placed the final cornerstone, however the bridge and surrounding embankments leading up to the crossing were unfinished. In December 1865, the bridge was first opened for public use, timed for Auckland residents to use to get to the Howick Races on Boxing Day. Heavy rain caused larger horse-drawn carriages to sink into the unfinished embankments on the Pakuranga side of the bridge. The embankments were completed in March 1866, and the bridge became regularly used by traffic. It was the first major construction link between the Auckland isthmus and the surrounding areas of the Auckland province, predating the Māngere Bridge, and the third swing-span bridge constructed in New Zealand, after earlier bridges at Kaiapoi (1863) and Ōpāwaho / the Heathcote River (1864).

It was constructed as a swing bridge allowing water traffic to pass by when a mechanism was manually operated, however, the swing was not operational for many months after construction, blocking traffic to Ōtāhuhu. Initially the bridge's swing mechanism only operated during day hours, however by 1867, high traffic on the river facilitated full-day operations of the swing span, at a cost of 5 shillings per vessel. The bridge was unpopular with many farmers who used the Tāmaki River to transport wheat, due to the long time needed to open the bridge for river traffic. After opening, the Panmure Bridge facilitated the first daily return omnibus between Auckland and Howick, and was used to transport livestock, such as by Alfred Buckland, who regularly transported flocks of up to 1,000 sheep across the bridge. After the construction of a hut, the bridge operated as a toll bridge, with the building later being used as a polling booth for local and national elections.

In August 1916, Prime Minister William Massey opened a replacement bridge, a ferro-concrete structure located to the south of the original bridge that was high enough to allowed ships to pass underneath. The original was dismantled and the wood sold. Over time, the concrete bridge suffered from deterioration issues, potentially due to the use of seawater during concrete construction, and could only transport a reduced traffic load.

The original bridge's swinging steelwork and bluestone pier remained intact after the bridge's demolition, housed underneath the site of a ship chandlery. After repairs in 2013, the swing-span mechanism on the east side was added to the New Zealand Historic Places Trust register in 2014. In 2023, the decrepit building above the swing bridge was demolished, exposing the remains of the 1865 bridge.

== 1959 bridge ==
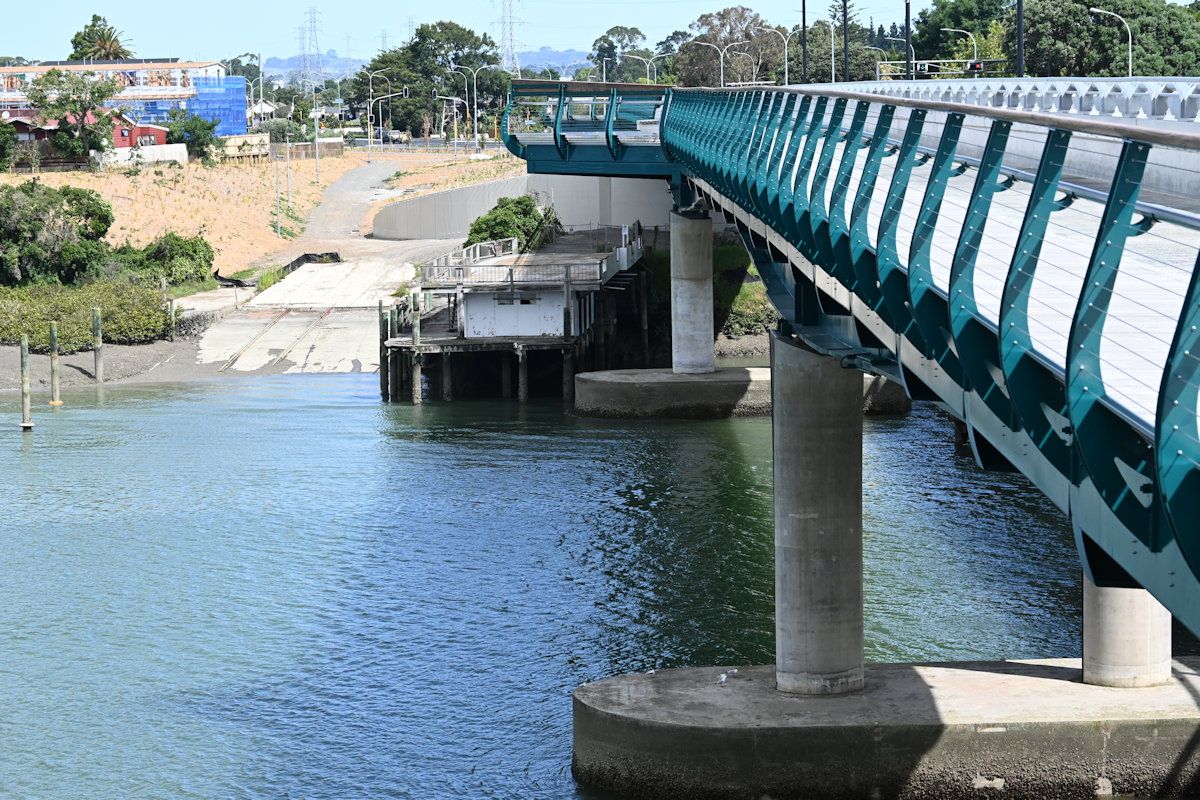
The 2021 busway bridge. The derelict building beneath the bridge protected the remains of original 1865 swing bridge. The building was demolished in 2023.

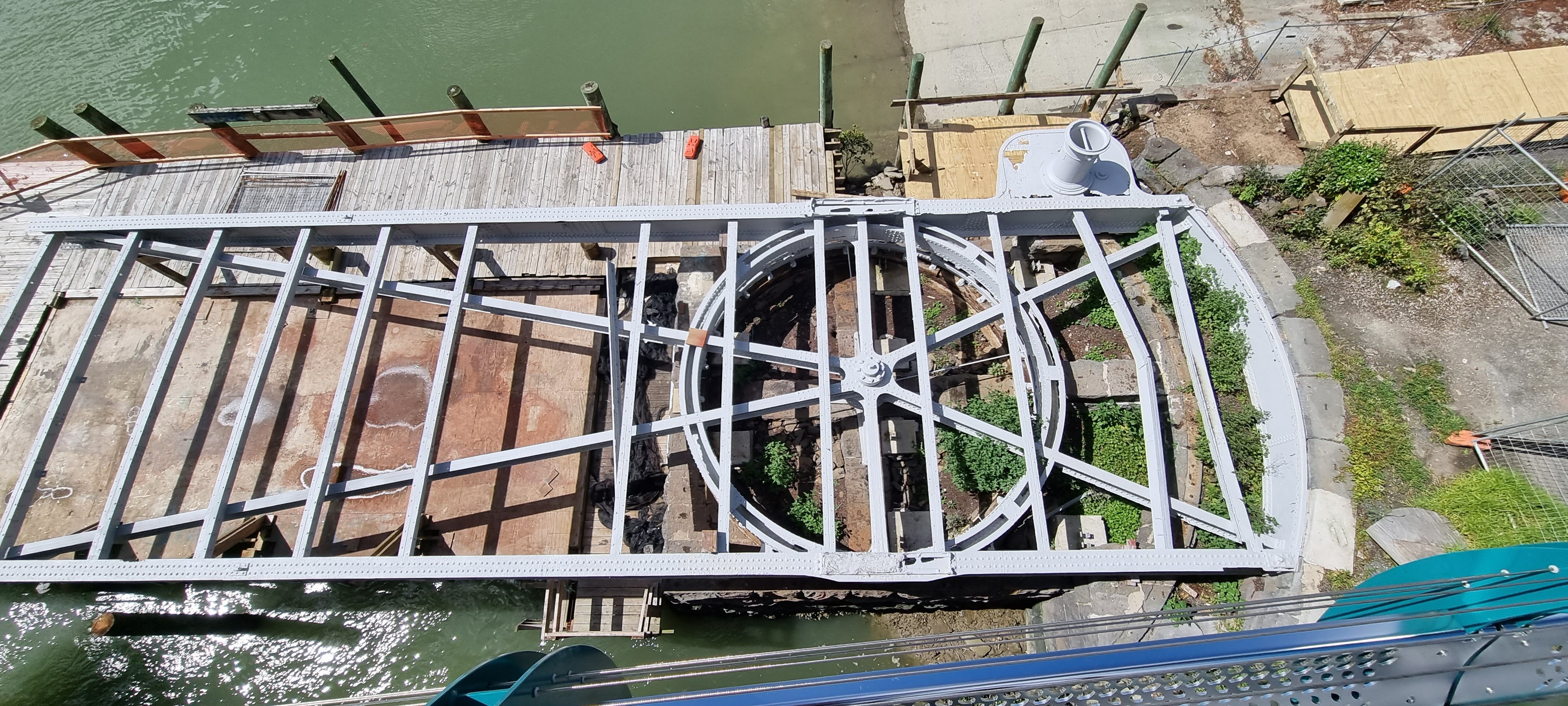
Remains of the 1865 swing bridge, visible in 2023

Tenders to replace the ferro-concrete bridge were sought in 1956. A variety of designs for the bridge were proposed, including a steel box-girder bridge, pre-stressed concrete and welded plate girder designs. The final accepted design used reinforced concrete supported by steel girders. A three-lane reinforced high-level bridge was opened in October 1959. The 1959 bridge has a reversible direction lane, allowing for two westward city-bound lanes operating in mornings and two eastbound lanes operating in evenings. In 1971, the Pakuranga Motorway Bridge / Waipuna Bridge was constructed to the south, which became the more popular route for traffic to cross the Tāmaki River.

In 2021, a parallel bridge was built adjacent to the 1959 Panmure Bridge, as a part of the Eastern Busway Project. The new bridge is a mixed use busway, cycling and pedestrian bridge, located overtop of the location of the original 1865 bridge. The busway bridge traverses the location of the swing-span mechanism on the eastern shores, and on the western shore the location of Mokoia pā, a 19th-century Ngāti Pāoa settlement, which is also covered by residential housing.
