= Botany Town Centre =

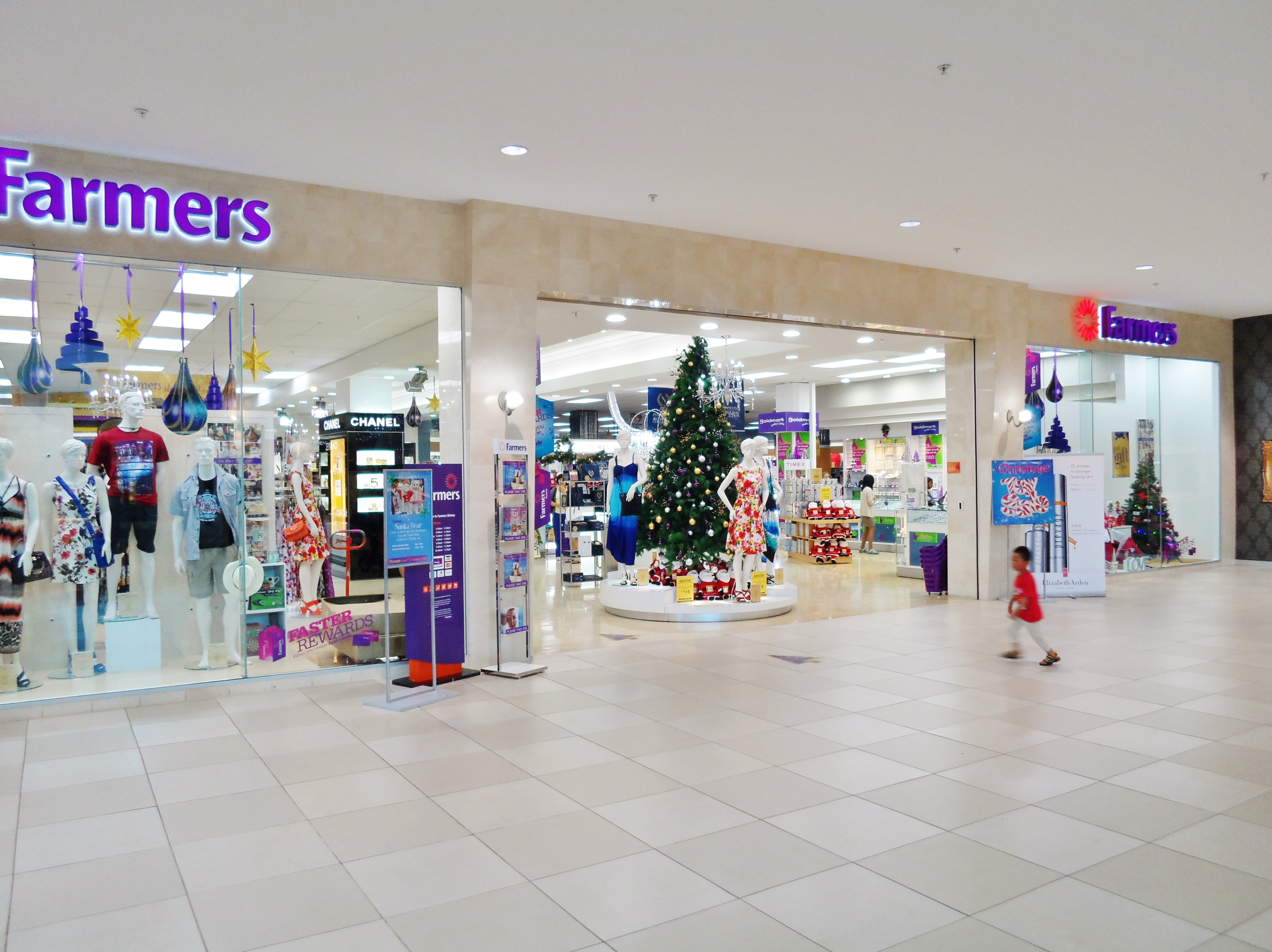
- Location: East Tāmaki, Auckland, New Zealand
- Coordinates: 36.933712°S 174.913167°E
- Address: Corner Ti Rakau Drive and Chapel Road
- Opened: 9 May 2001; 25 years ago
- Manager: Dexus
- Owner: CPP Investments/PSP Investments
- Num. of stores: 200+
- Num. of anchor tenants: 5
- Floor area: 62,700 m^{2} (675,000 sq ft)
- Parking: 2,535
- Website: botanytowncentre.co.nz

Botany Town Centre is a large shopping mall and lifestyle centre located in Auckland, New Zealand. It has more than 200 stores spread across three complexes, including restaurants and entertainment buildings such as cinemas. It is situated at the corner of Ti Rakau Drive and Chapel Road in the suburb of East Tāmaki, and was opened in May 2001.

The centre has faced competition since the 2006 opening of the nearby Sylvia Park shopping centre in Mount Wellington, which was built as an enclosed mall. However, Botany Town Centre sees its town centre format as its strength, and considers that elements such as doctors' premises and a library make Botany more attractive.

== History ==
In the years after it opened, Botany Town Centre won awards for its design. Meanwhile, Manukau City Council opened an "idealibrary" in the centre in 2004.

In 2005, a Ministry for the Environment study of the town centre and surrounding suburbs found that the area lacked integrated land-use planning with an "incoherent mixture of conventional and medium-density housing." A planner said the "road-dominated environment to get to the nearby Botany Town Centre is not pedestrian friendly," while public transport had been "under-used and arguably inadequate in range and frequency of routes available" at the time. Others had criticised the centre for being a commercialised public space.

In a 2008 rating of New Zealand shopping centres by a retail expert group, Botany Town Centre received three-and-a-half stars, just under the maximum rating of four stars, based on the criteria of amount of shopping area, economic performance, amenity and appeal as well as future growth prospects.

On 2 May 2019, the first stage of a three-area redevelopment was opened. The redevelopment takes the centre's size to 62,700 square metres.

== Transport ==
The mall is accessible via several high-frequency AT Metro bus services which depart from its bus interchange. During the day, buses on the 70 line run at least every 10 minutes towards Pakuranga, Panmure and the city centre. Meanwhile, buses run every 15 minutes towards Howick and Highland Park on the 72 bus line, towards Flat Bush and Manukau on the 35 bus line and towards Ōtara on the 31 bus line. Lower frequency services, usually every half hour, provide trips to Highbrook, Bucklands Beach, Half Moon Bay and Mission Heights.

Bike racks are also provided at several locations throughout Botany Town Centre.

=== Future rapid transit integration ===
In 2018, Auckland Transport began planning rapid public transport between Botany and Auckland Airport. It is part of a wider programme to improve the transport system in South Auckland. A busway station is planned for the town centre, as the terminus for the Eastern Busway rapid transit link to Panmure railway station. It is due to be completed in 2027.

== See also ==
- List of shopping centres in New Zealand
