= Eastern Busway, Auckland =

Busway project that is under construction

Eastern Busway
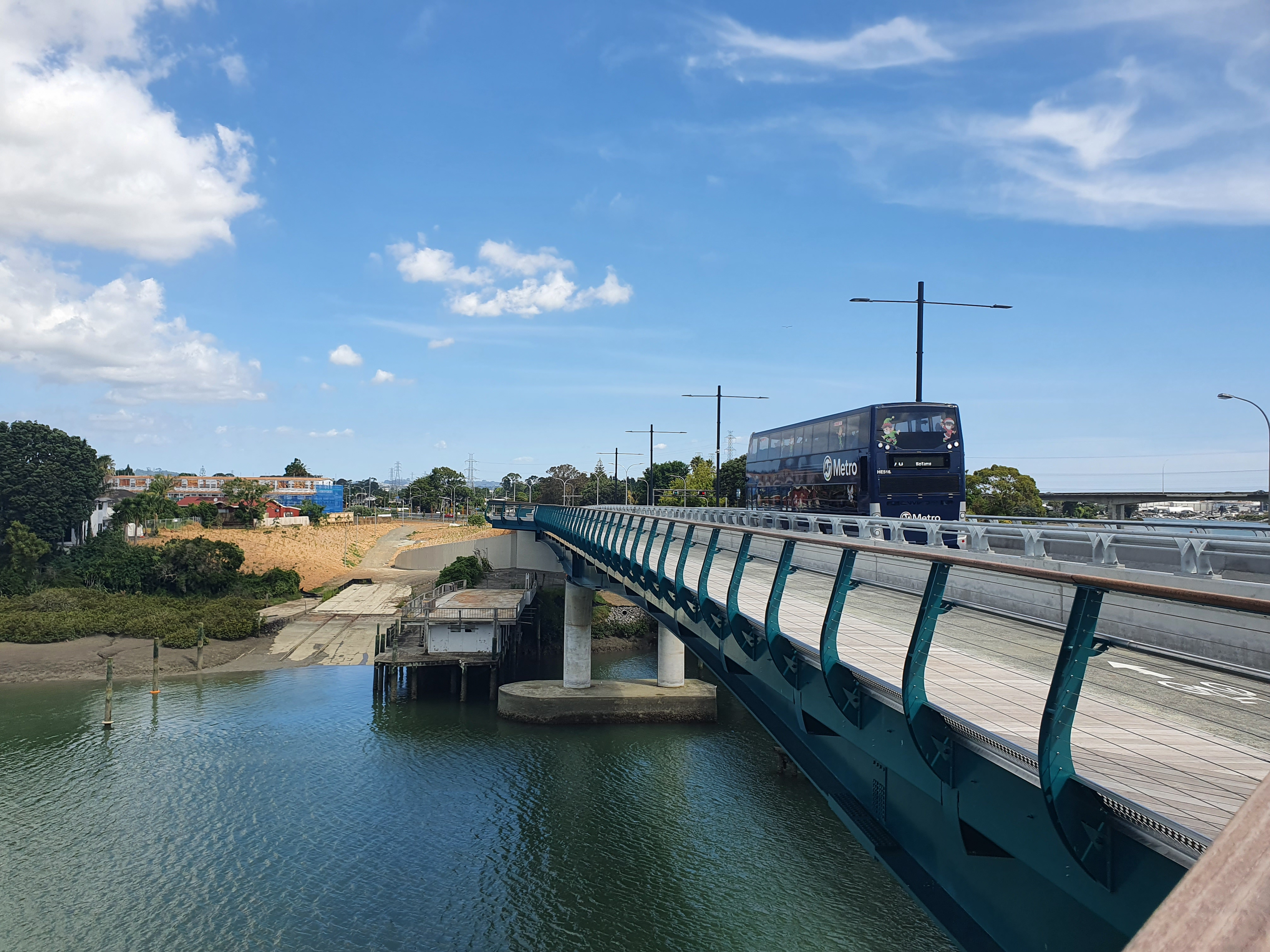
- A double-decker bus using the Eastern Busway on the Panmure Bridge.

Overview
- Status: Under construction
- Owner: Auckland Transport
- Locale: East Auckland
- Termini: Panmure; Botany

Service
- Type: Bus rapid transit
- System: AT Buses
- Operator(s): Kinetic Group (Go Bus); Howick & Eastern Buses

History
- Opened: 2021 (Panmure to Pakuranga); 2027 (Entire project)

Map of the busway, with the completed section shown in red.

The Eastern Busway, also known as AMETI (the Auckland Manukau Eastern Transport Initiative), is an urban busway under construction in the southeastern suburbs of Panmure, Pakuranga and Botany, in Auckland, New Zealand. The first section of the busway, between Panmure and Pakuranga, opened in December 2021. The entire project is expected to be complete by 2027.

== History ==
In early 2018, preliminary demolition and removal of some properties in Panmure took place, and in October 2018, removal of 61 remaining properties began. Auckland Council's transport and property management CCO's, Auckland Transport and Panuku respectively, had worked to re-house affected owners and tenants.

The removal of the 61 properties from Lagoon Drive and Pakuranga Road was completed in early 2019, allowing construction of the lanes of the Panmure-Pakuranga section to start.

In March 2020 work on the Project was suspended as a result of the COVID-19 pandemic. Auckland Council applied to Infrastructure Industry Reference Group for project funding during lockdown.

A new bridge, dedicated to the busway lanes, was built across the Tāmaki Estuary alongside the existing Panmure Bridge. On completion, the busway is expected to account for 35 percent of all journeys across Panmure Bridge, about 22,000 bus passengers per day.

In April 2023, construction began on the final phase of the project, with the dedicated busway extended from Pakuranga to a station at Botany, as well as the provision of separated new walking and cycling facilities.

A flyover, named Rā Hihi, was constructed over Tī Rākau Drive, connecting the South Eastern Highway to Pakuranga Road. The bridge is said to ease congestion in the area, especially during peak hours. Rā Hihi opened uni-directionally in the citybound direction on 1 October 2025 and opened bi-directionally on 27 October.

In February 2026, Minister of Transport, Chris Bishop, confirmed $101 million worth of funding for the final stretch of the busway route, through Guys Reserve, before terminating at Botany.

== Busway stations ==
=== Panmure ===
Panmure Station connects to the Eastern Line train services and bus services towards Newmarket, Sylvia Park and Glen Innes.

=== Williams Avenue ===
Located alongside Pakuranga Road, Williams Avenue is named after the nearby street of the same name. Construction started in early 2019 and was opened in December 2021.

=== Pakūranga ===
Pakūranga is a busway station serving the suburb of Pakuranga and the shopping centre of Pakuranga Plaza.

=== Edgewater / Te Taha Wai ===
Edgewater (Te Taha Wai in Māori) is a future busway station, named after the nearby Edgewater Drive. The station is undergoing planning and design and is expected to be opened in 2027. The station will have staggered platform layout, separated by the Edgewater Drive junction.

=== Gossamer / Koata ===
Gossamer (Koata in Māori) is a future busway station, named after the nearby Gossamer Drive. The station is undergoing planning and design and is expected to be opened in 2027. The station will have staggered platform layout on either side of Gossamer Drive with the platforms being separated by the junction and the busway crossing over Tī Rākau Drive.

=== Burswood / Pōhatu ===
Burswood (Pōhatu in Māori) is a future busway station that will serve the suburb of Burswood. The busway will curve away from Tī Rākau Drive, and the station will be located behind Bunnings. The station is undergoing planning and design and is expected to be opened in 2027.

=== Botany ===
Botany will be the future terminus of the Eastern Busway, serving the Botany Town Centre shopping centre and suburb of Dannemora. The station is undergoing planning and design and is expected to be opened in 2027.

== See also ==
- Eastern Transport Corridor – a route reserved for an eastern motorway that was politically unpopular and led to the busway project
- Northern Busway, Auckland
- Public transport in Auckland
