= Pakuranga Plaza =

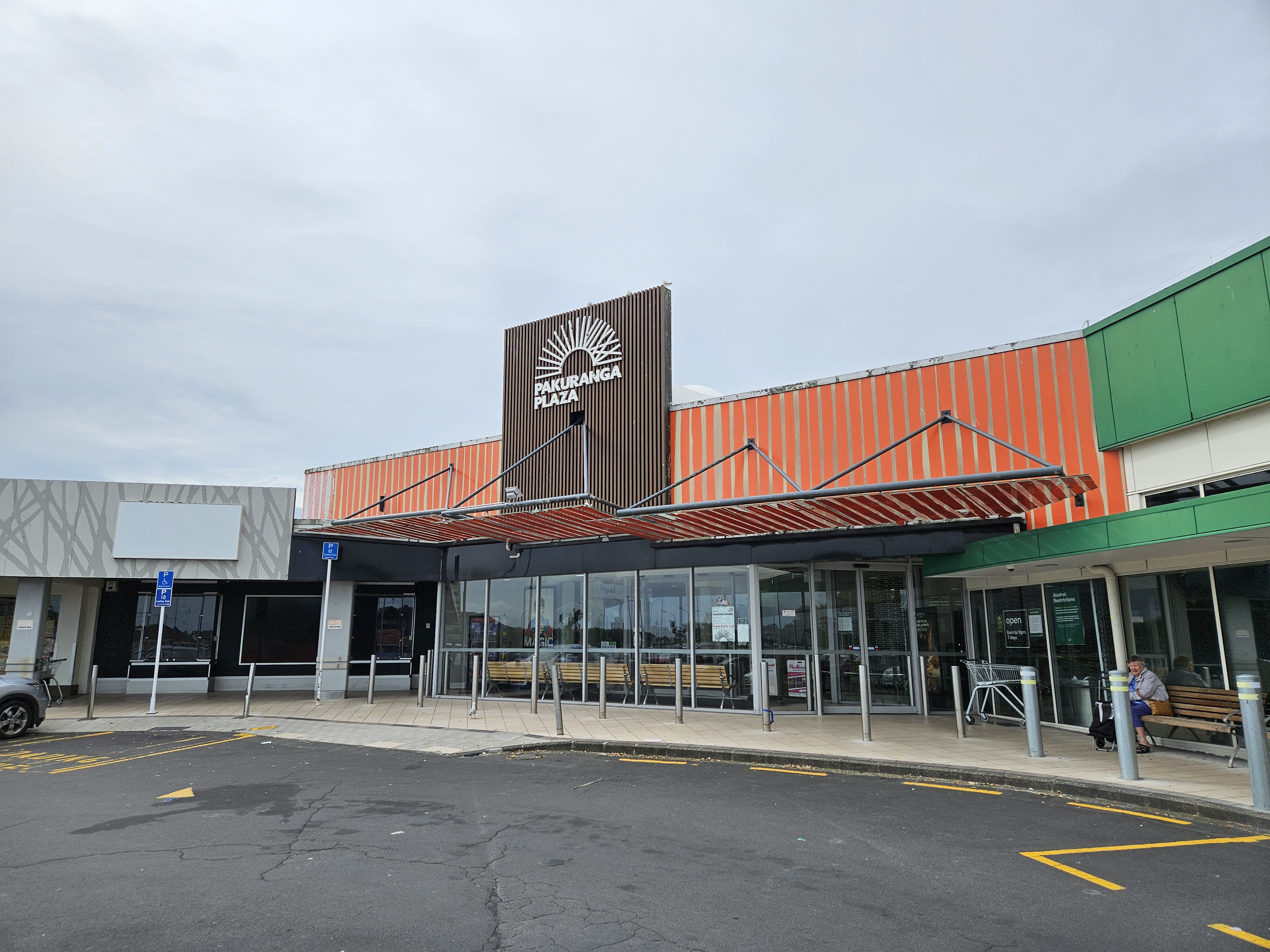
- Location: Pākuranga, Auckland, New Zealand
- Coordinates: 36.912800°S 174.871745°E
- Address: Cnr. Ti Rakau Drive and Pakuranga Road
- Opened: 1965; 61 years ago
- Owner: GYP Properties
- Num. of stores: 80+
- Num. of anchor tenants: 2
- Website: pakurangaplaza.co.nz

Pakuranga Plaza is a shopping mall in Pakuranga, Auckland, New Zealand. The centre includes several dozen stores, including the anchor tenants Woolworths and Panda Mart. The Warehouse closed in 2025 after 32 years of operating.

Originally opened in 1965 as the Pakuranga Town Centre, the mall was one of the earliest malls in New Zealand, incorporating Farmers and George Court department stores. The mall itself has been transformed several times since it was first built and retains little of the 1960s style it once had (it was originally open to the air).

The mall was later acquired by the Westfield Group and branded as a Westfield Pakuranga.

In a 2008 rating of New Zealand shopping centres by a retail expert group, the mall received three out of four stars based on the criteria of amount of shopping area, economic performance, amenity and appeal as well as future growth prospects. It was noted to have received a relatively high rating even though struggling with major competition from Botany Town Centre and Sylvia Park.

On 10 December 2012, the mall was sold to Ladstone Holdings Ltd and was renamed Pakuranga Plaza. The mall was resold in October 2014 to GYP Properties.

A busway station is to be built at the centre, as an intermediate stop on the Eastern Busway that will connect Botany Town Centre and Panmure railway station.

== See also ==
- List of shopping centres in New Zealand
