= Waikaraka Cycleway =

Cycle route in Auckland, New Zealand

Coordinates: 36.9310265°S 174.8001274°E

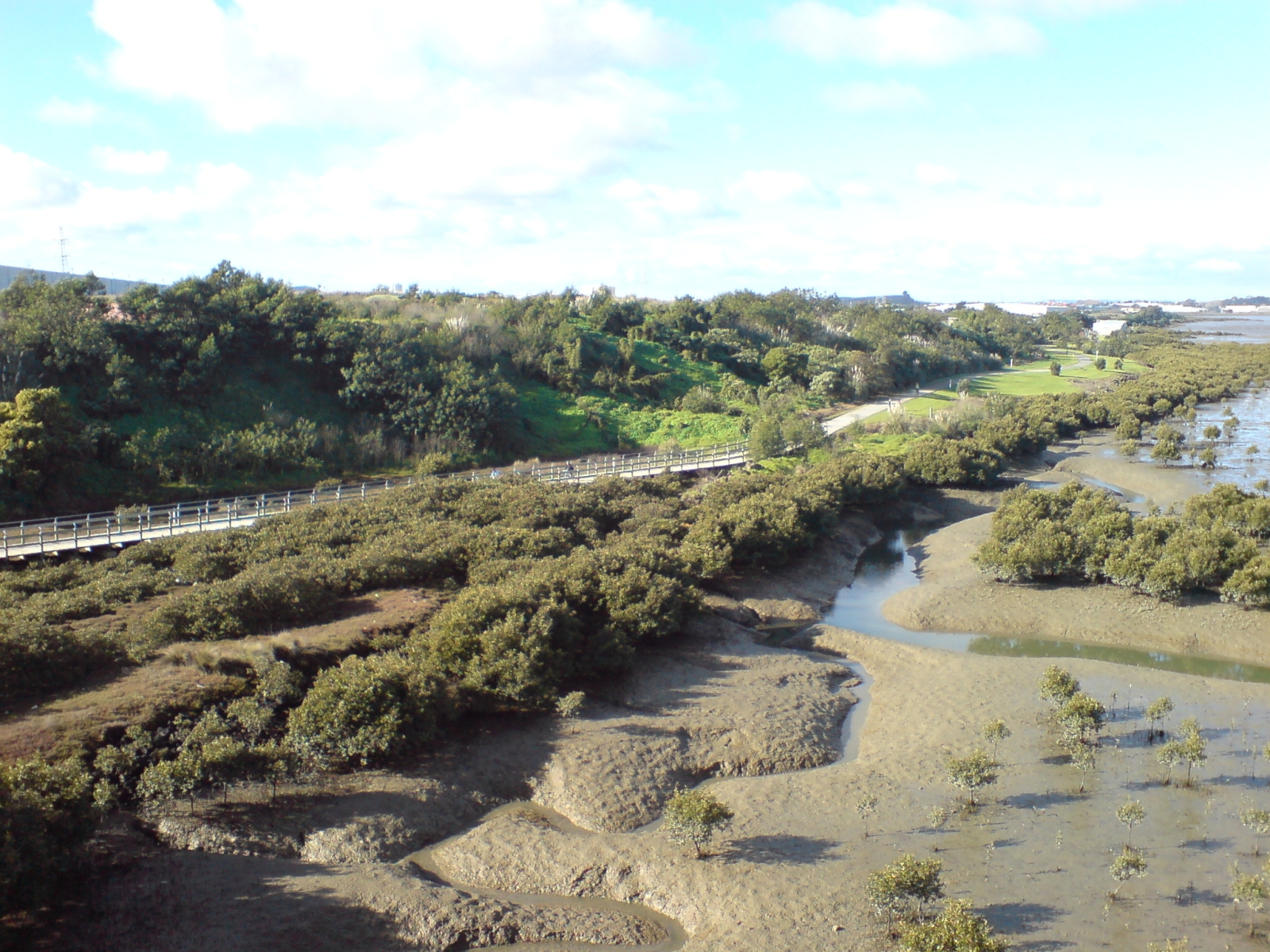
- A boardwalked section near the Māngere Bridge
- Location: Auckland, New Zealand
- Trailheads: Maioro Street (northwest) to; Hugo Johnston Drive (southeast)
- Use: Cycling, pedestrian
- Difficulty: Easy
- Season: All seasons
- Surface: Asphalt

Trail map
- Map of the Waikaraka Cycleway

The Waikaraka Cycleway is an off-road cycleway in the south of the Auckland isthmus, New Zealand, running from the suburb of Wesley along New Zealand State Highway 20 to Onehunga and then continuing along the shoreline of the Manukau Harbour (Māngere Inlet) beside mostly industrialised areas until it ends at Hugo Johnston Drive, in Southdown.

== Construction and extensions ==
The initial construction of the cycleway was plagued by cost blow-outs, as the cost-estimates did not sufficiently allow for a number of extra factors during construction, such as remedial work around contaminated land, and the need to construct the path to a long-lasting quality on worse ground than initially expected, and above an underground gas pipeline route.

=== Along SH20 ===
Originally running only currently 4 km from Onehunga, near the Māngere Bridge to Pikes Point, the cycleway was extended in 2008 along the Southwestern Motorway (State Highway 20) as far as the motorway's western end. As of early 2010 this extension of the link currently still had gaps near Onehunga and the Mt Roskill cone, which were closed as works on the Mangere Bridge duplication and the Mt Roskill park facilities proceeded, with this latter gap finished in July 2010.

The Mt Roskill gap was particularly late in being closed, due to sensitive issues regarding building a motorway and the associated cycleway across the side of a protected environment that is also important to local Māori. An agreement was finally reached that narrowed the cycleway locally (but avoided proposals which would have created long detours around the south of the mountain) and included significant new landscaping, as well as Māori carvings such as a winged sculptural gate across the path.

=== Other linkages ===
NZ Transport Agency has also improved linkages to the cycleway near Mangere Bridge, including with a new overbridge over Onehunga Harbour Road and works on the causeway / Old Mangere Bridge link to the Māngere Bridge suburb to the south.

=== Link to Northwestern Cycleway ===
In May 2011, the Board of Inquiry hearing the resource consent process for the Waterview Connection decided that NZTA was to set aside $8 million for the construction of an off-road surface cycleway between SH16 and the existing SH20 section in Hillsborough, as part of the tunneling project. This will create a connection between the Northwestern Cycleway and the Waikaraka Cycleway.

== Gallery ==
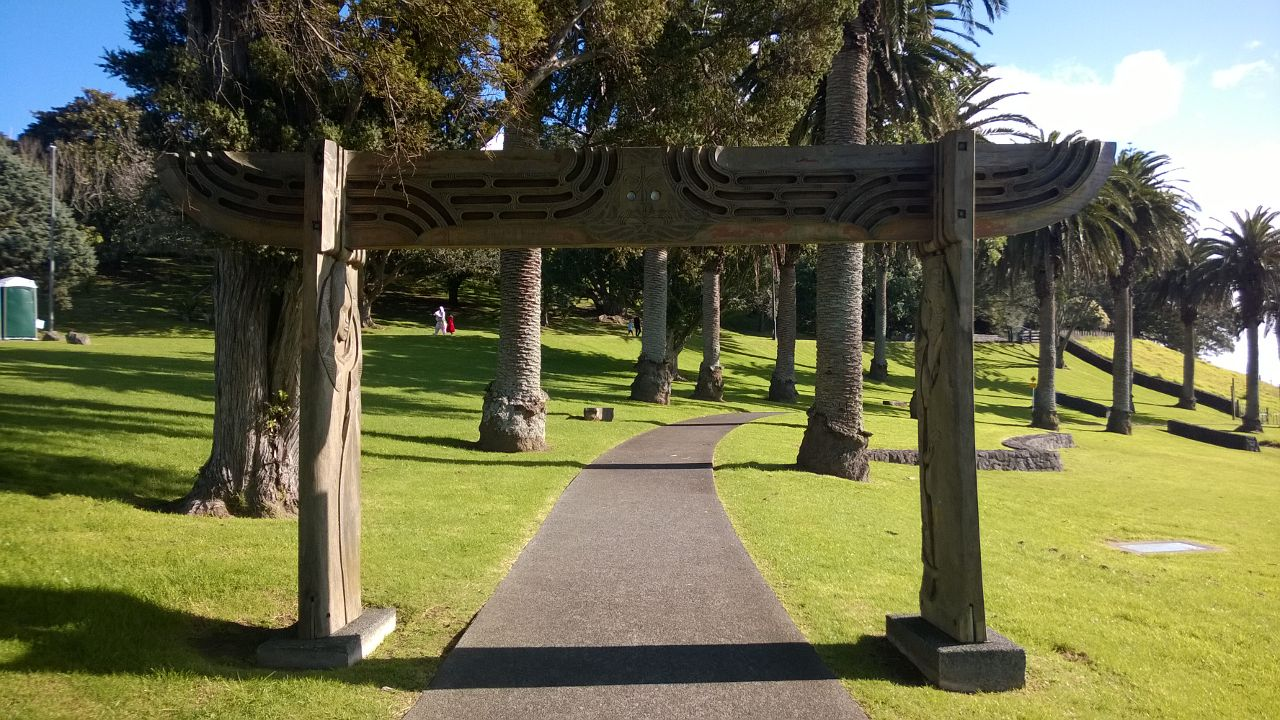
A carved gate over the path near Mount Roskill.

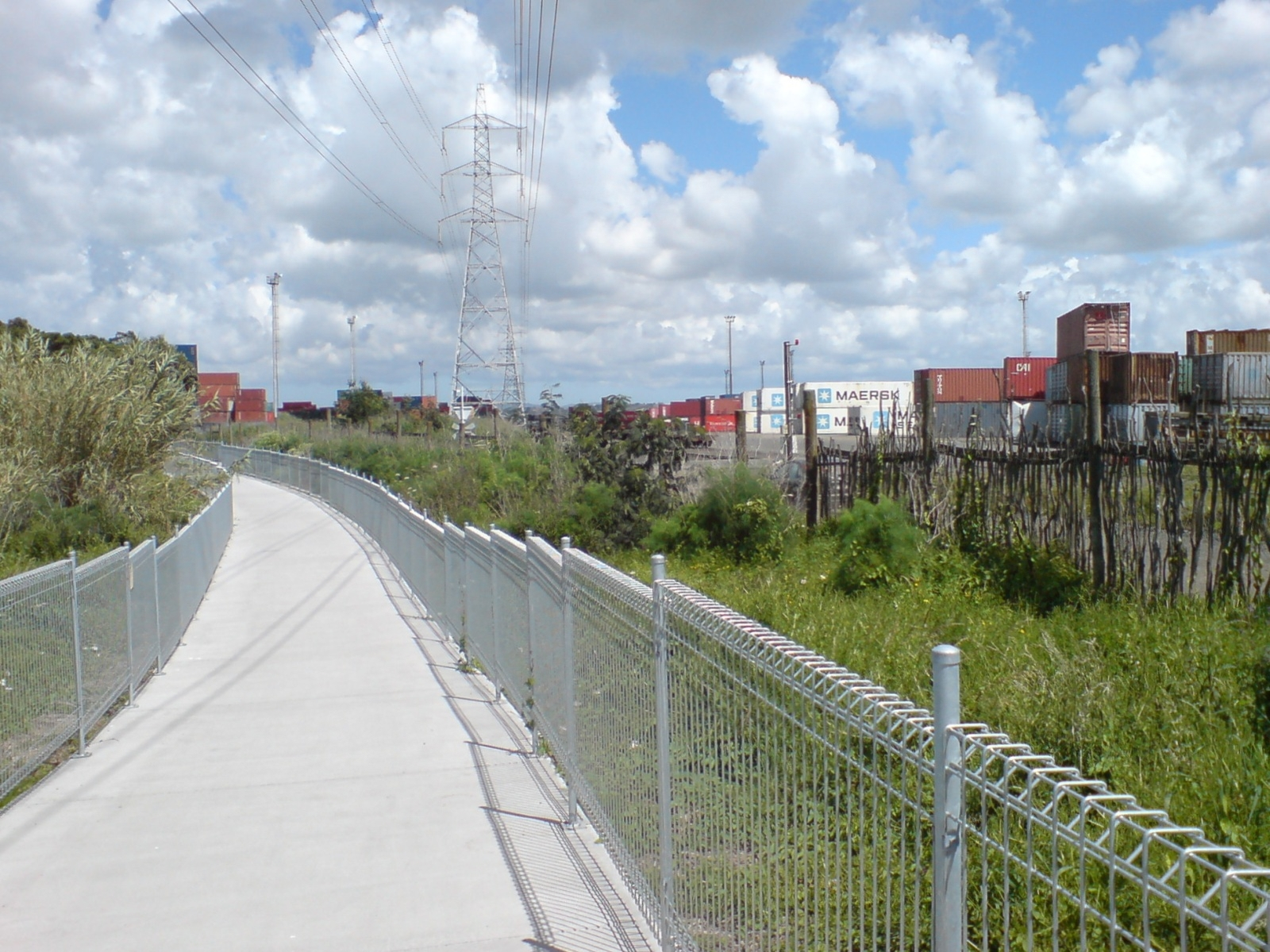
The cycleway along a container freight depot.
