= Pakuranga =

- Suburb
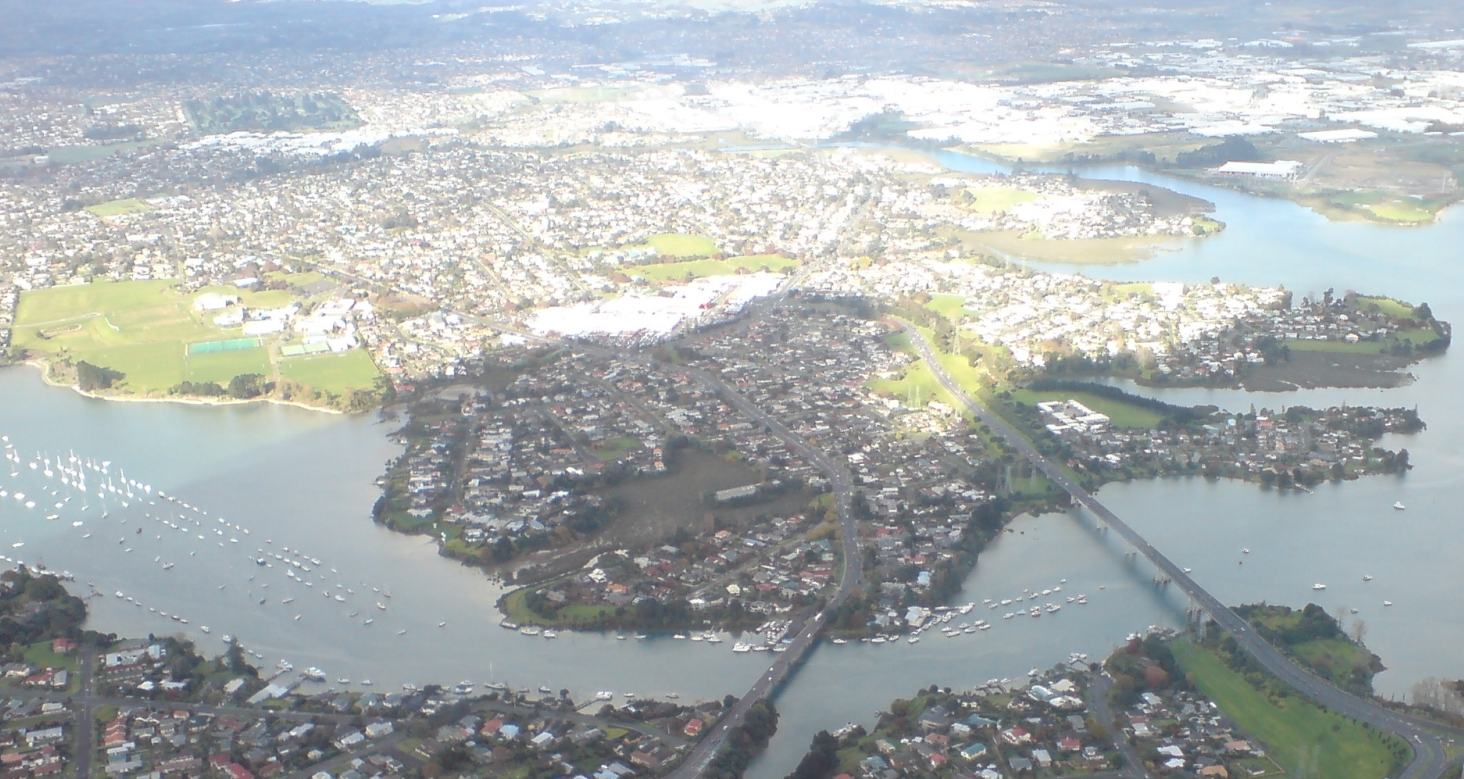
- Pakuranga, looking east (the suburb is the "peninsula"-shape on the far side of the Tamaki River)
- Interactive map of Pakuranga
- Coordinates: 36.913°S 174.872°E
- Country: New Zealand
- City: Auckland
- Local authority: Auckland Council
- Electoral ward: Howick ward
- Local board: Howick Local Board

Area
  - Land: 342 ha (850 acres)

Population (June 2025)
  - Total: 9,980
  - Density: 2,920/km^{2} (7,560/sq mi)

(Tamaki River), Panmure	(Tamaki River), Glen Innes	Sunnyhills
(Tamaki River), Mount Wellington	Pakuranga	Pakuranga Heights
(Tamaki River), Ōtāhuhu	(Tamaki River)	East Tāmaki

Pakuranga is an eastern suburb of Auckland, in northern New Zealand. Pakuranga covers a series of low ridges and previously swampy flats, now drained, that lie between the Pakuranga Creek and Tamaki River, two estuarial arms of the Hauraki Gulf. It is located to the north of Manukau and 15 kilometres southeast of the Auckland CBD.

== Geography ==
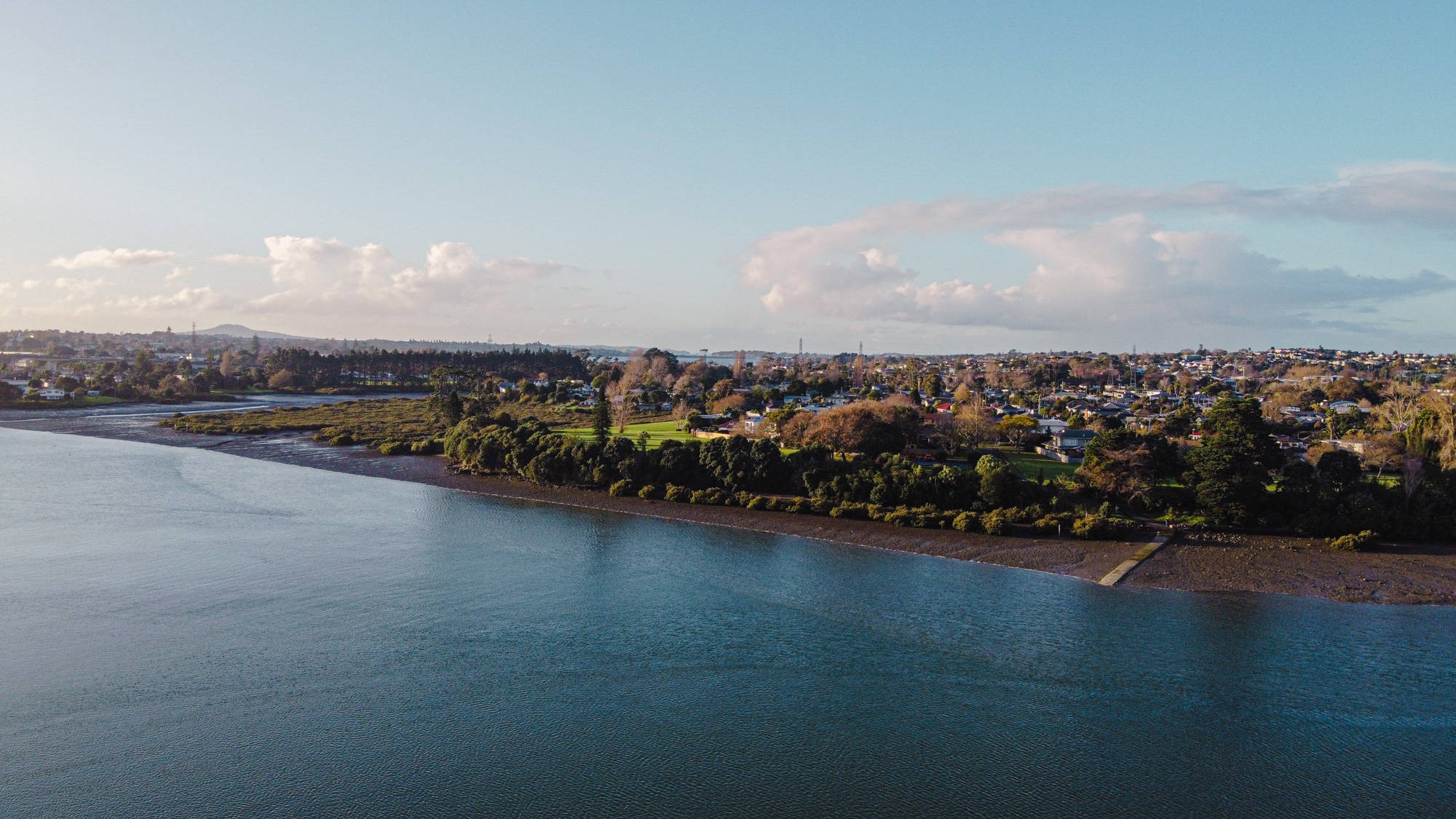
Pakuranga is located on the eastern shores of the Tāmaki River

Pakuranga is located on the eastern shores of the Tāmaki River, on a peninsula formed between the river and the Pakuranga Creek to the south. In the 19th Century, inland Pakuranga was a peat wetland, dominated by Cordyline australis (tī kōuka / cabbage trees).

=== Climate ===
Climate data for Pakuranga (2001–2017)
Month	Jan	Feb	Mar	Apr	May	Jun	Jul	Aug	Sep	Oct	Nov	Dec	Year
Record high °C (°F)	31.9 (89.4)	29.9 (85.8)	28.7 (83.7)	27.9 (82.2)	26.0 (78.8)	22.3 (72.1)	20.7 (69.3)	22.1 (71.8)	23.1 (73.6)	26.6 (79.9)	28.6 (83.5)	29.2 (84.6)	31.9 (89.4)
Mean maximum °C (°F)	28.3 (82.9)	27.7 (81.9)	26.8 (80.2)	25.0 (77.0)	22.3 (72.1)	20.4 (68.7)	18.8 (65.8)	19.8 (67.6)	21.3 (70.3)	23.0 (73.4)	24.4 (75.9)	26.3 (79.3)	28.9 (84.0)
Mean daily maximum °C (°F)	24.7 (76.5)	25.2 (77.4)	24.1 (75.4)	21.9 (71.4)	19.1 (66.4)	16.9 (62.4)	16.0 (60.8)	16.7 (62.1)	18.2 (64.8)	19.3 (66.7)	21.0 (69.8)	22.8 (73.0)	20.5 (68.9)
Daily mean °C (°F)	19.9 (67.8)	20.4 (68.7)	19.1 (66.4)	16.9 (62.4)	14.4 (57.9)	12.2 (54.0)	11.0 (51.8)	11.7 (53.1)	13.4 (56.1)	14.7 (58.5)	16.4 (61.5)	18.4 (65.1)	15.7 (60.3)
Mean daily minimum °C (°F)	15.0 (59.0)	15.5 (59.9)	14.2 (57.6)	11.9 (53.4)	9.4 (48.9)	7.5 (45.5)	5.9 (42.6)	6.8 (44.2)	8.6 (47.5)	10.2 (50.4)	11.8 (53.2)	14.1 (57.4)	10.9 (51.6)
Mean minimum °C (°F)	9.6 (49.3)	11.0 (51.8)	8.9 (48.0)	5.4 (41.7)	1.6 (34.9)	0.5 (32.9)	−0.9 (30.4)	0.5 (32.9)	2.3 (36.1)	4.0 (39.2)	6.3 (43.3)	9.6 (49.3)	−1.4 (29.5)
Record low °C (°F)	5.2 (41.4)	6.7 (44.1)	5.6 (42.1)	0.8 (33.4)	−2.2 (28.0)	−3.3 (26.1)	−2.5 (27.5)	−1.7 (28.9)	−1.1 (30.0)	2.2 (36.0)	5.0 (41.0)	5.0 (41.0)	−3.3 (26.1)
Average rainfall mm (inches)	82.2 (3.24)	63.8 (2.51)	94.1 (3.70)	103.3 (4.07)	98.1 (3.86)	112.6 (4.43)	137.8 (5.43)	128.7 (5.07)	107.7 (4.24)	94.6 (3.72)	99.7 (3.93)	89.6 (3.53)	1,212.2 (47.73)
Source: NIWA

== Etymology ==
The name Pakuranga is a contraction of Te Pakuranga-rāhīhī ("The Battle of the Sun's Rays"), a traditional Tāmaki Māori story involving a battle between the supernatural Tūrehu people of the Waitākere and Hunua ranges, where magic was used to turn warriors into stone using the sun's rays. The gods Mataaho and Rūaumoko, after hearing of this battle, create the Auckland volcanic field in their rage. The name Pakuranga is a name that was also used for Ōhuiarangi / Pigeon Mountain, a volcano in Half Moon Bay.

The name Pakuranga was used by early European settlers from the 1840s to refer to the area between the Tāmaki River and Tūranga Creek. After the establishment of Howick, the name Pakuranga referred to the rural area to the west of the settlement as far as the Tāmaki River. The Pakuranga Highway District, defined in 1863, included areas to the north such as Bucklands Beach. The modern Pakuranga area was first formally defined in 1956, with the establishment of the Pakuranga County Town.

== History ==
=== Māori history ===
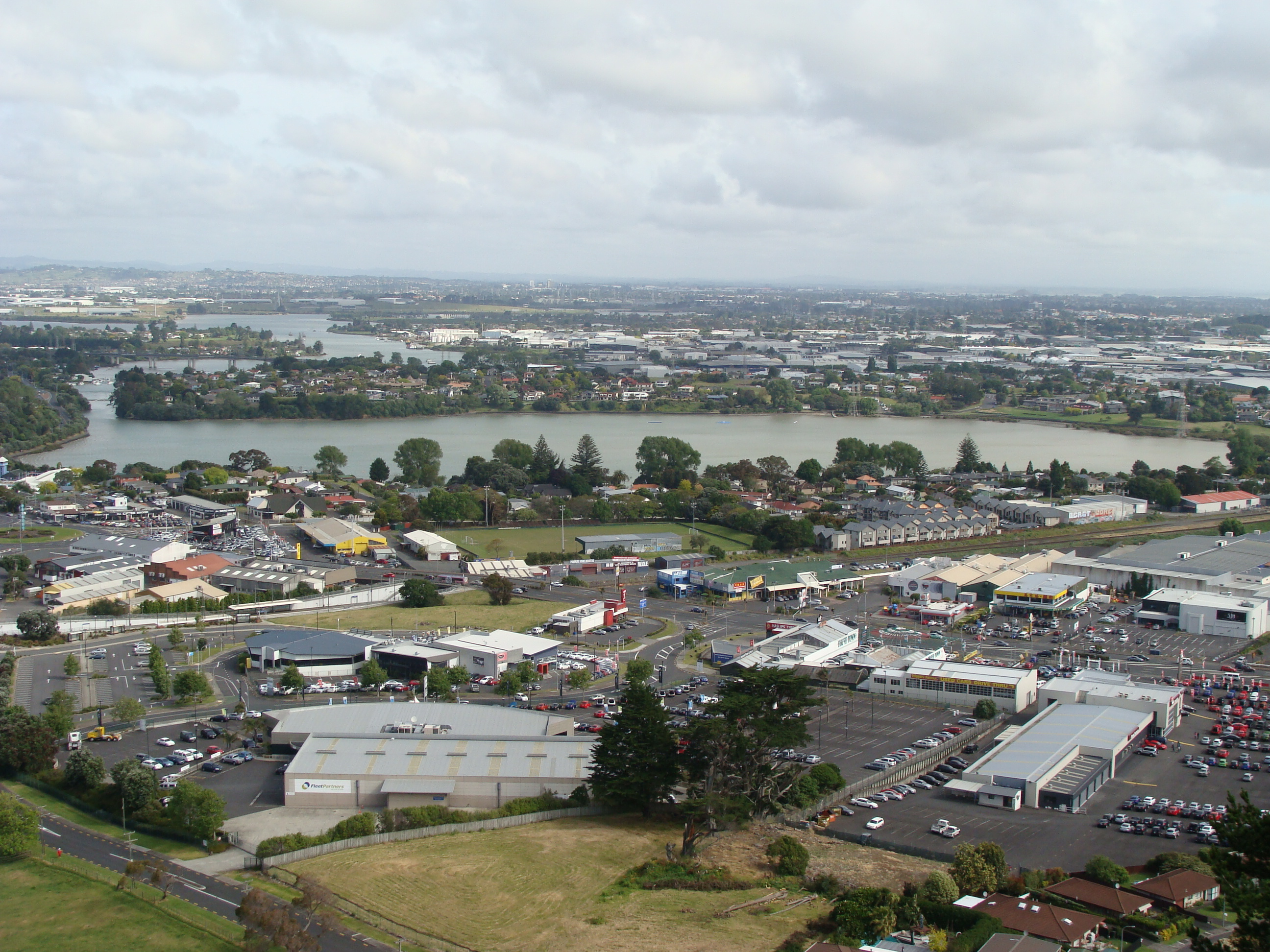
The Panmure Basin area close to Pakuranga was a major settlement for Ngāti Pāoa in the early 19th Century

The Pakuranga area is part of the rohe of Ngāi Tai ki Tāmaki, who descend from the crew of the Tainui migratory waka, who visited the area around the year 1300. The mouth of the Tāmaki River was traditionally known as Te Wai ō Tāikehu ("The Waters of Tāikehu"), named after the Ngāi Tai ancestor Tāikehu. Tāikehu settled with his followers along the eastern shores of the Tāmaki River, alongside the descendants of Huiārangi of the early iwi Te Tini ō Maruiwi. The upper reaches of the river near modern Pakuranga is traditionally known as Te Wai Mokoia, referring to Mokoikahikuwaru, a protector taniwha of the Tainui waka who is described in legends as taking up residence at the Panmure Basin.

Ngāi Tai created extensive cultivations along the eastern shores of the Tāmaki River. Ōhuiarangi / Pigeon Mountain was an important pā site for Ngāi Tai ki Tāmaki, named after ancestress Huiārangi, daughter of Tāmaki of Te Tini ō Maruiwi. The slopes of the mountain and surrounding areas were home to stonefield gardens, and the mountain was an important location for snaring kererū. In approximately the first half of the 18th century, Ngāriki, a rangatira of Ngāi Tai, built a fortified pā at Te Naupata (Musick Point), the headland at the end of the peninsula, called Te Waiārohia (a shortening of Te Waiārohia ō Ngāriki). The followers of Ngāriki also settled at the Ōhuiarangi pā.

By the mid-18th century, Ngāti Pāoa, a Hauraki Gulf tribe with close relationships to Ngāi Tai, established themselves on the western shores of the river at Panmure, at Mokoia pā and a kāinga called Mauināina. By the time missionaries Samuel Marsden and John Gare Butler visited the isthmus in 1820, there were thousands of inhabitants living along the shores of the Tāmaki River at Mokoia.

During the Musket Wars in the 1820s, Mokoia pā and Mauināina were attacked by a Ngāpuhi taua (war party), devastating the settlement. The wider area was evacuated by Ngāti Pāoa and Ngāi Tai, with most members of Ngāi Tai fleeing to the Waikato for temporary refuge during this time. When English missionary William Thomas Fairburn visited the area in 1833, it was mostly unoccupied. The land at Mokoia and Mauināina pā became tapu for Ngāti Pāoa due to the large number of deaths, and was not resettled.

In 1836, William Thomas Fairburn brokered a land sale between Tāmaki Māori chiefs covering the majority of modern-day South Auckland, East Auckland and the Pōhutukawa Coast. The sale was envisioned as a way to end hostilities in the area, but it is unclear what the chiefs understood or consented to. Māori continued to live in the area, unchanged by this sale. In 1854 when Fairburn's purchase was investigated by the New Zealand Land Commission, a Ngāi Tai reserve was created around the Wairoa River and Umupuia areas, and as a part of the agreement, members of Ngāi Tai agreed to leave their traditional settlements to the west.

=== European settlement ===
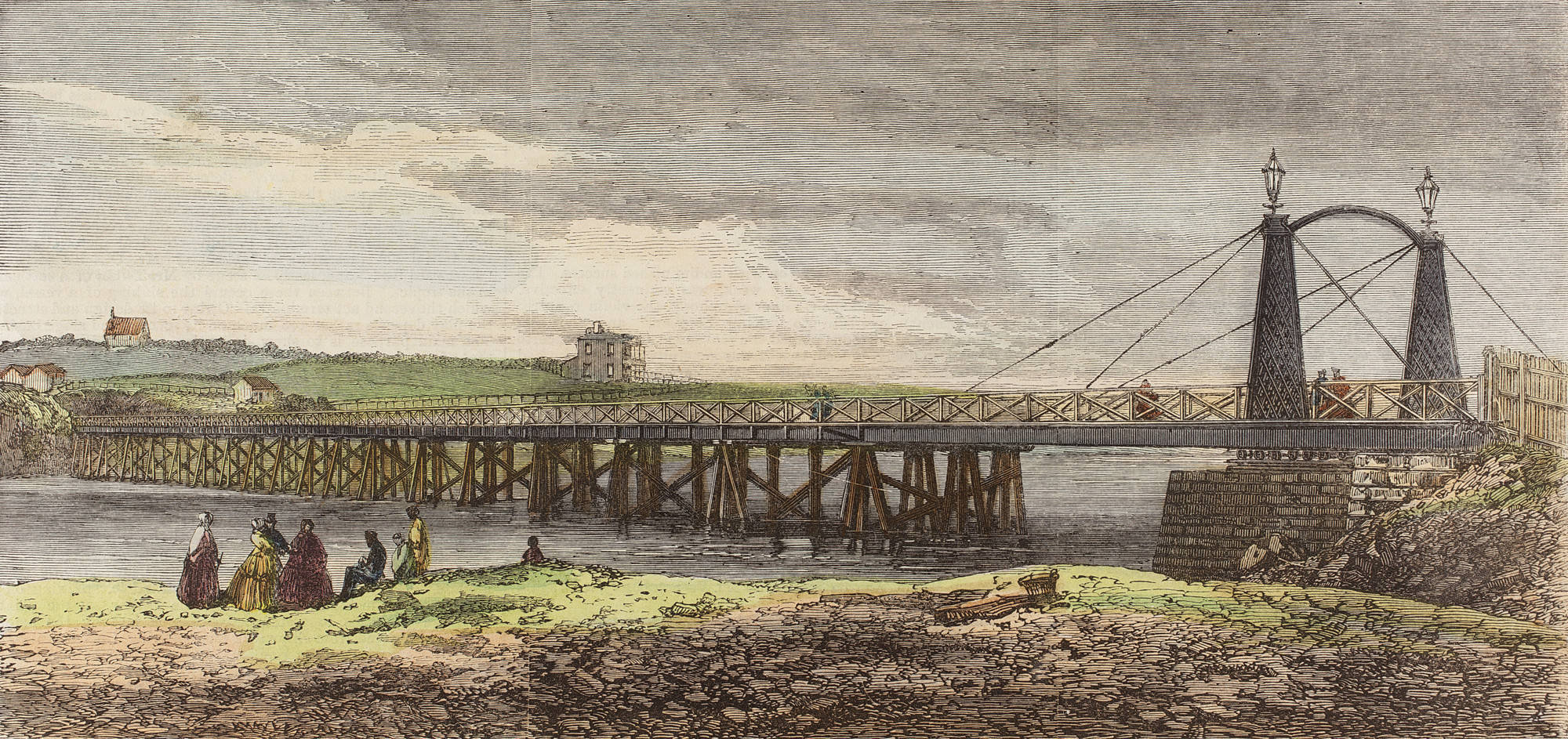
Lithograph of the first Panmure Bridge in 1867

The Pakuranga area was sold by Government auction in 1843. Much of the area was farmed by Hemi Pepene, a Ngāpuhi orphan who grew up at the Paihia Mission Station and was taken care of by the Fairburns, and by Joseph Hargreaves, who bought 82 acres in 1843 and constructed the first European house in Pakuranga. In 1847, Howick was established as a defensive outpost for Auckland, by fencibles (retired British Army soldiers) and their families. The first ferry services across the river to Panmure began in 1850. Many of the first European farmers in the area were fencibles from Howick, such as brothers Robert and Every Maclean in 1851 who developed extensive livestock farms, and Patrick and Ann Fitzpatrick who bought land in 1852. By the mid-1860s, wheat became the most significant crop in the area.

In September 1863 during the Invasion of the Waikato, the Ngāi Tai village of Ōtau near Clevedon was attacked by the British army, and the village was evacuated, with people moving to communities at the river's mouth. While Māori of South Auckland such as Te Ākitai Waiohua were forced to leave, Ngāi Tai were designated as a "friendly" people by the Crown and remained neutral in the fighting. After the Native Lands Act of 1865, the Native Land Court confiscated many Ngāi Tai lands. The remaining land was individuated, slowly sold on to European farmers.

Pakuranga became more accessible after the opening of the Panmure Bridge, connecting Pakuranga to Panmure across the Tāmaki River in 1865. In the same year, the capital of New Zealand was moved from Auckland to Wellington, causing major financial problems for the area as land prices plummeted and demand for butter dropped. In 1869, Alfred, Duke of Saxe-Coburg and Gotha (the Duke of Edinburgh) visited New Zealand, spending a month living at Pakuranga.

In 1874, the Pakuranga Hunt was established and by 1900 had become one of the largest social clubs in Auckland. The Hunt was based in East Tāmaki, organising hare hunts and county balls for the wider area. The name Pakuranga became synonymous with the hunt, and by 1960 the hunt had relocated south to Karaka.

By the later 19th Century, Pakuranga developed into an area similar to the English countryside, dominated by poplar, oak and willow trees. Over time, the wheat fields were gradually replaced with dairy farms, which dominated the area until the 1940s. The Pakuranga Hall was opened in 1921,

=== Suburbanisation ===
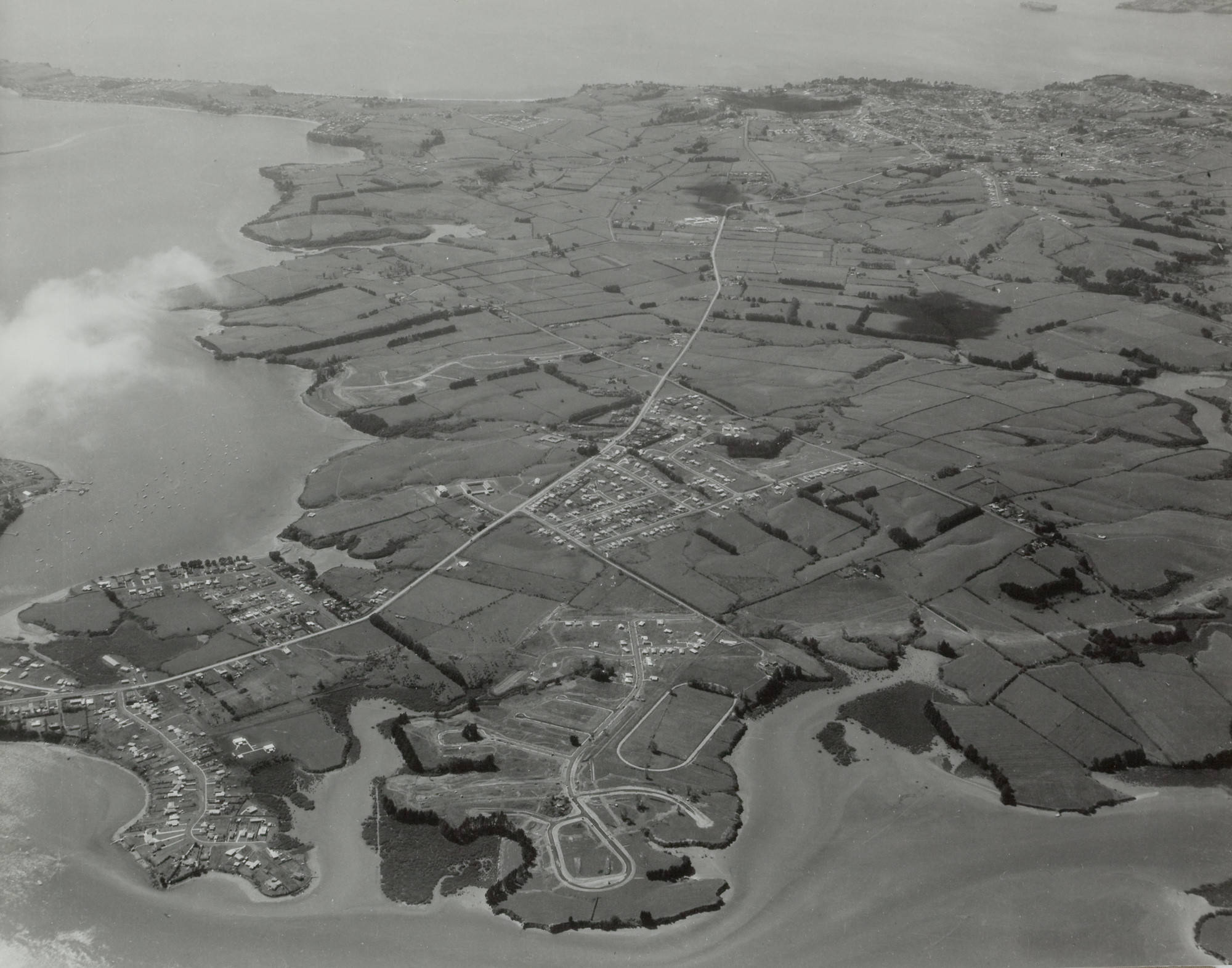
Aerial view of Pakuranga in 1961, when the area was predominantly farmland

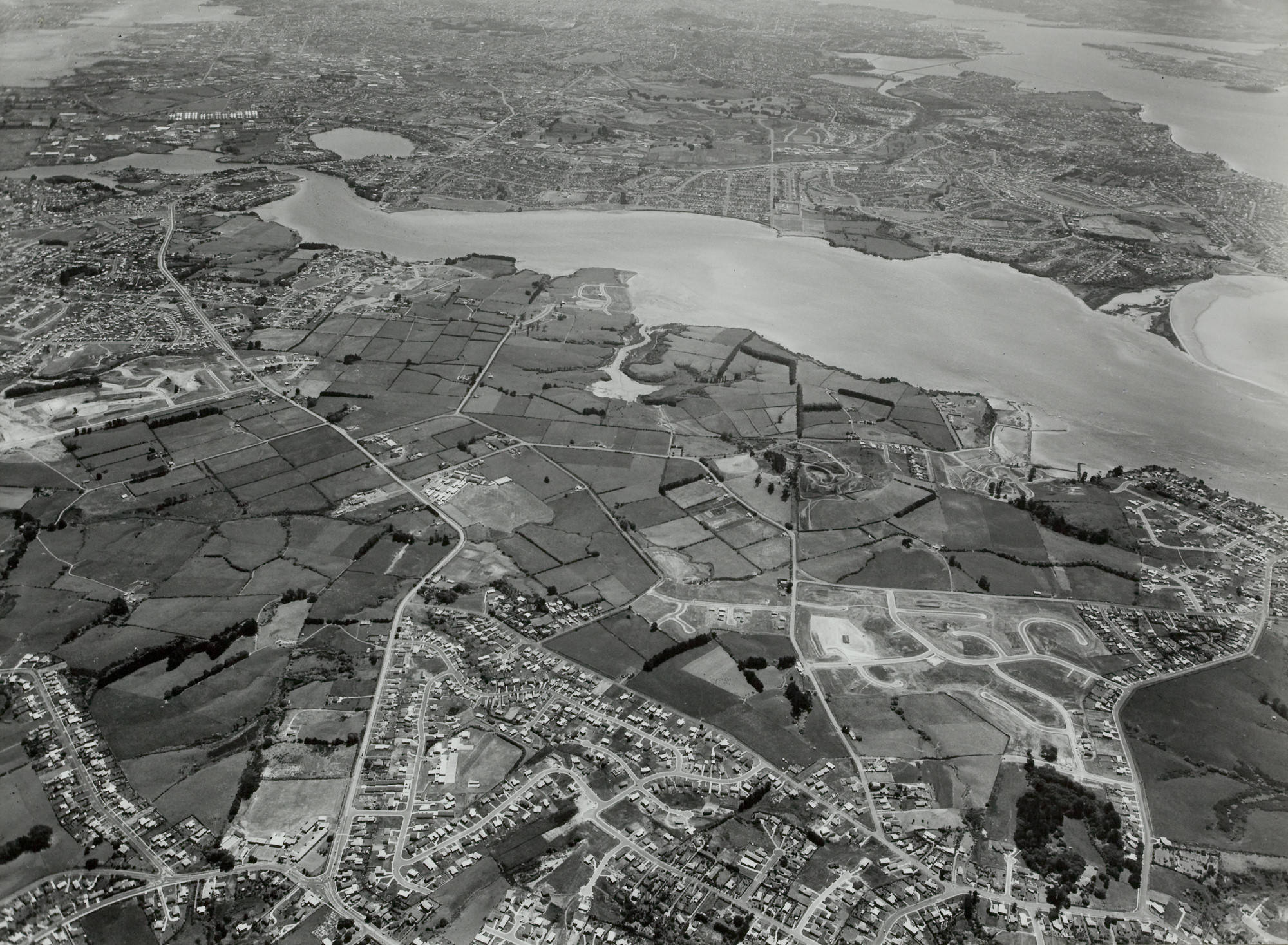
Aerial view of Pakuranga in 1969, during the widespread construction of suburban housing developments

In the 1930s, the road to Howick was concreted, improving transport times for milk to Auckland, and for passengers into the area. In 1948, Pakuranga was considered as a potential site for the new international airport, which eventually opened in Māngere. Land in Pakuranga was subdivided into housing from the 1950s, and the Manukau County Council planned to leave a green belt separating Pakuranga from Howick, however lost a court case with a farmer who planned to subdivide his land. By 1956, the area had grown in size enough that the Pakuranga County Town was established within Manukau County. A new Panmure Bridge facilitated further growth after its construction in 1959.

In 1965, the Pakuranga Town Centre (now known as Pakuranga Plaza) was officially opened. It was the second modern American-style mall constructed in Auckland, and incorporated a number of major stores, such as Farmers and a George Court department store. By the mid-1970s, Pakuranga developed an image as a stereotypical location for busy housewives. The area acquired the nicknames "Nappy Valley" and "Vim Valley", the latter referring to a popular advertisement for the cleaning product Vim, that featured Pakuranga housewives.

The Pakuranga Community Hall was opened in 1975, and in 1981 Lloyd Elsmore Park, a multi-purpose urban park, sporting facility and home to the Howick Historical Village, was officially opened.

The Eastern Busway, a project to link Botany to Panmure by rapid transport, began construction in 2019. The busway opened to Pakuranga in 2021, with the entire project scheduled to open by the mid-2020s.

== Demographics ==
Pakuranga covers 3.42 km^{2} (1.32 sq mi) and had an estimated population of 9,980 as of June 2025, with a population density of 2,918 people per km^{2}.

Historical population
Year	Pop.	±% p.a.
2006	6,576	—
2013	8,697	+4.07%
2018	9,252	+1.24%
2023	8,898	−0.78%
The 2006 population is for a smaller area of 2.52 km^{2}. Source:

Pakuranga had a population of 8,898 in the 2023 New Zealand census, a decrease of 354 people (−3.8%) since the 2018 census, and an increase of 201 people (2.3%) since the 2013 census. There were 4,470 males, 4,410 females and 21 people of other genders in 2,859 dwellings. 2.8% of people identified as LGBTIQ+. The median age was 36.4 years (compared with 38.1 years nationally). There were 1,638 people (18.4%) aged under 15 years, 1,800 (20.2%) aged 15 to 29, 4,176 (46.9%) aged 30 to 64, and 1,284 (14.4%) aged 65 or older.

People could identify as more than one ethnicity. The results were 40.9% European (Pākehā); 12.4% Māori; 15.3% Pasifika; 43.7% Asian; 2.5% Middle Eastern, Latin American and African New Zealanders (MELAA); and 2.1% other, which includes people giving their ethnicity as "New Zealander". English was spoken by 88.4%, Māori language by 2.3%, Samoan by 2.9%, and other languages by 36.4%. No language could be spoken by 2.7% (e.g. too young to talk). New Zealand Sign Language was known by 0.3%. The percentage of people born overseas was 50.0, compared with 28.8% nationally.

Religious affiliations were 35.5% Christian, 5.1% Hindu, 4.0% Islam, 0.9% Māori religious beliefs, 3.1% Buddhist, 0.3% New Age, 0.1% Jewish, and 2.1% other religions. People who answered that they had no religion were 42.9%, and 6.3% of people did not answer the census question.

Of those at least 15 years old, 2,031 (28.0%) people had a bachelor's or higher degree, 2,940 (40.5%) had a post-high school certificate or diploma, and 2,292 (31.6%) people exclusively held high school qualifications. The median income was $43,200, compared with $41,500 nationally. 771 people (10.6%) earned over $100,000 compared to 12.1% nationally. The employment status of those at least 15 was that 3,960 (54.5%) people were employed full-time, 765 (10.5%) were part-time, and 210 (2.9%) were unemployed.

Individual statistical areas
Name	Area (km^{2})	Population	Density (per km^{2})	Dwellings	Median age	Median income
Pakuranga North	1.35	2,700	2,000	972	37.6 years	$46,100
Pakuranga West	0.94	2,724	2,898	846	37.4 years	$37,900
Pakuranga Central	1.13	3,474	3,074	1,041	34.6 years	$45,000
New Zealand					38.1 years	$41,500

== Notable places ==
Pakuranga Plaza was established in 1965.

Howick Historical Village is a recreation of a 19th-century European settler village. It opened to the public in 1997.

Te Tuhi (previously known as Te Tuhi Centre for the Arts), an art gallery, opened in 1975.

Bell House was built in 1851 and moved onto its current location at Lloyd Elsmore Park in 1895. In 1973 it was donated to the Historic Places Trust.

== Schools ==
There was no school in the area before the 1960s so children had to walk or ride horses to the old Howick school which was located across from the Highland Park shops. The old school was moved to the old village display in Bells Rd, Pakuranga.

Edgewater College is a secondary school (years 9–13) with a roll of 639 students.

Pakuranga Intermediate is an intermediate school (years 7–8) with a roll of 278 students.

Anchorage Park School and Riverina School are contributing primary schools (years 1–6) with rolls of 122 and 138 students, respectively.

Saint Kentigern College (not to be confused with the boys' and girls' schools located in Remuera), is a private Presbyterian secondary school (years 7–13) with a roll of 2,343 students.

All these schools are coeducational. Rolls are as of July 2026.

== Local government ==
The first local government in the area was the Borough of Auckland, which was established in 1851 and administered some areas of Pakuranga. In 1865, the Pakuranga Highway District was established, later becoming the Pakuranga Road Board. This was merged into the Manukau County in 1921. By 1956, the area had grown in size enough that the Pakuranga County Town was established within the Manukau County. This was merged into Manukau City in 1965. In November 2010, all cities and districts of the Auckland Region were amalgamated into a single body, governed by the Auckland Council.

Pakuranga is part of the Howick local board area, who elects members of the Howick Local Board. Residents of Howick also elect two Howick ward councillors, who sits on the Auckland Council.

== See also ==
- Pakuranga (New Zealand electorate)

== Bibliography ==
- Ballara, Angela (2003). "Tāmaki-makau-rau (Auckland isthmus)". Taua: 'musket wars', 'land wars' or tikanga?: warfare in Maori society in the early nineteenth century. Auckland: Penguin. ISBN 9780143018896.
- Bloomfield, G.T. (1973). The Evolution of Local Government Areas in Metropolitan Auckland, 1840–1971. Auckland University Press, Oxford University Press. ISBN 0-19-647714-X.
- La Roche, Alan (2011). Grey's Folly: A History of Howick, Pakuranga, Bucklands-Eastern Beaches, East Tamaki, Whitford, Beachlands and Maraetai. Auckland: Tui Vale Productions. ISBN 978-0-473-18547-3. OCLC 1135039710. Wikidata Q118286377.
- La Roche, John (2011). "Tamaki River Bridge, Panmure". In La Roche, John (ed.). Evolving Auckland: The City's Engineering Heritage. Wily Publications. ISBN 9781927167038.
