= Māngere Bridge (bridges) =

Bridge in New Zealand

Coordinates: 36.933220°S 174.788060°E

View of Māngere Bridge in 2026.

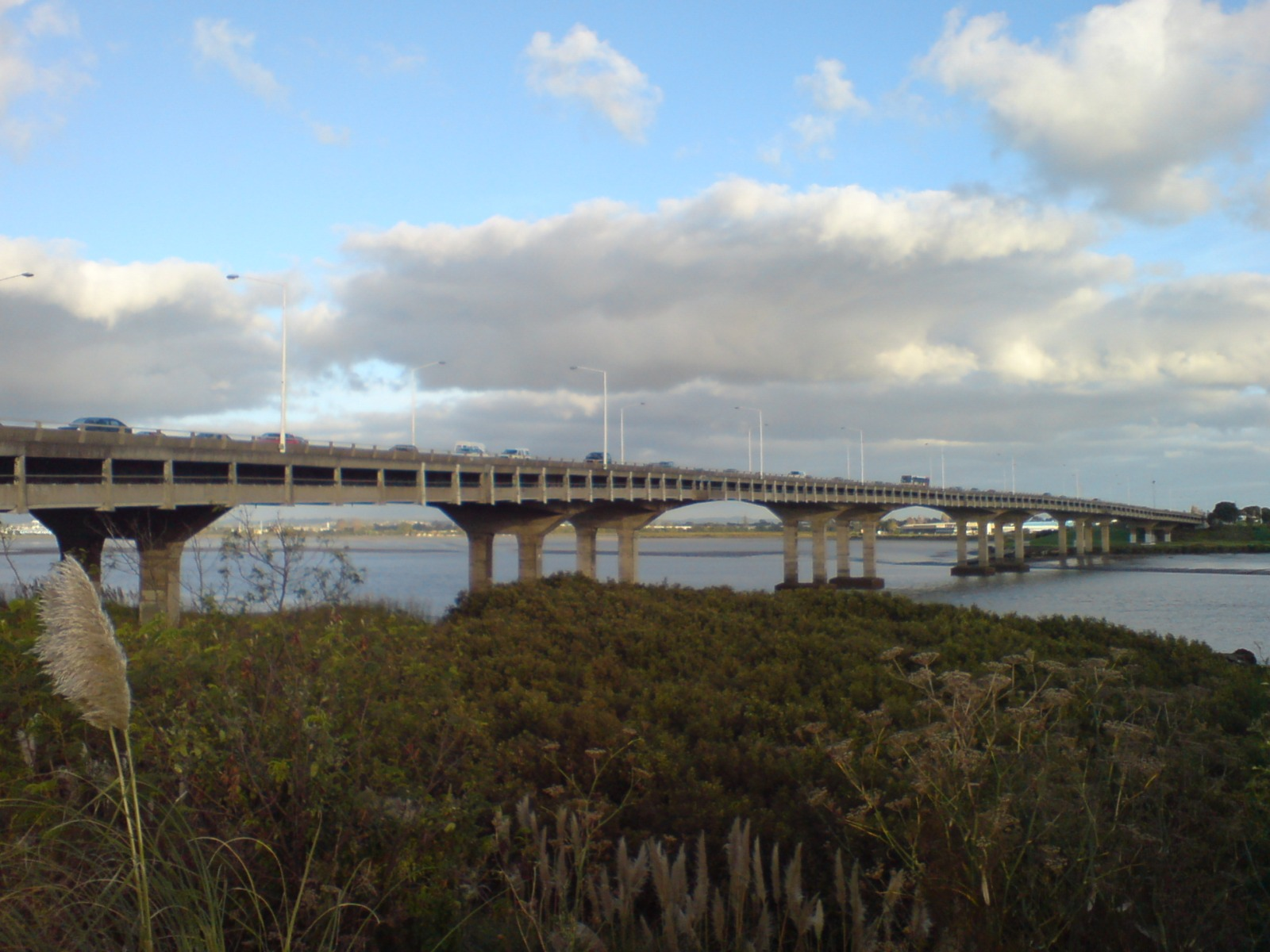
The pre-duplication bridge as seen from the west and north (Onehunga). The new bridge is on the opposite side.

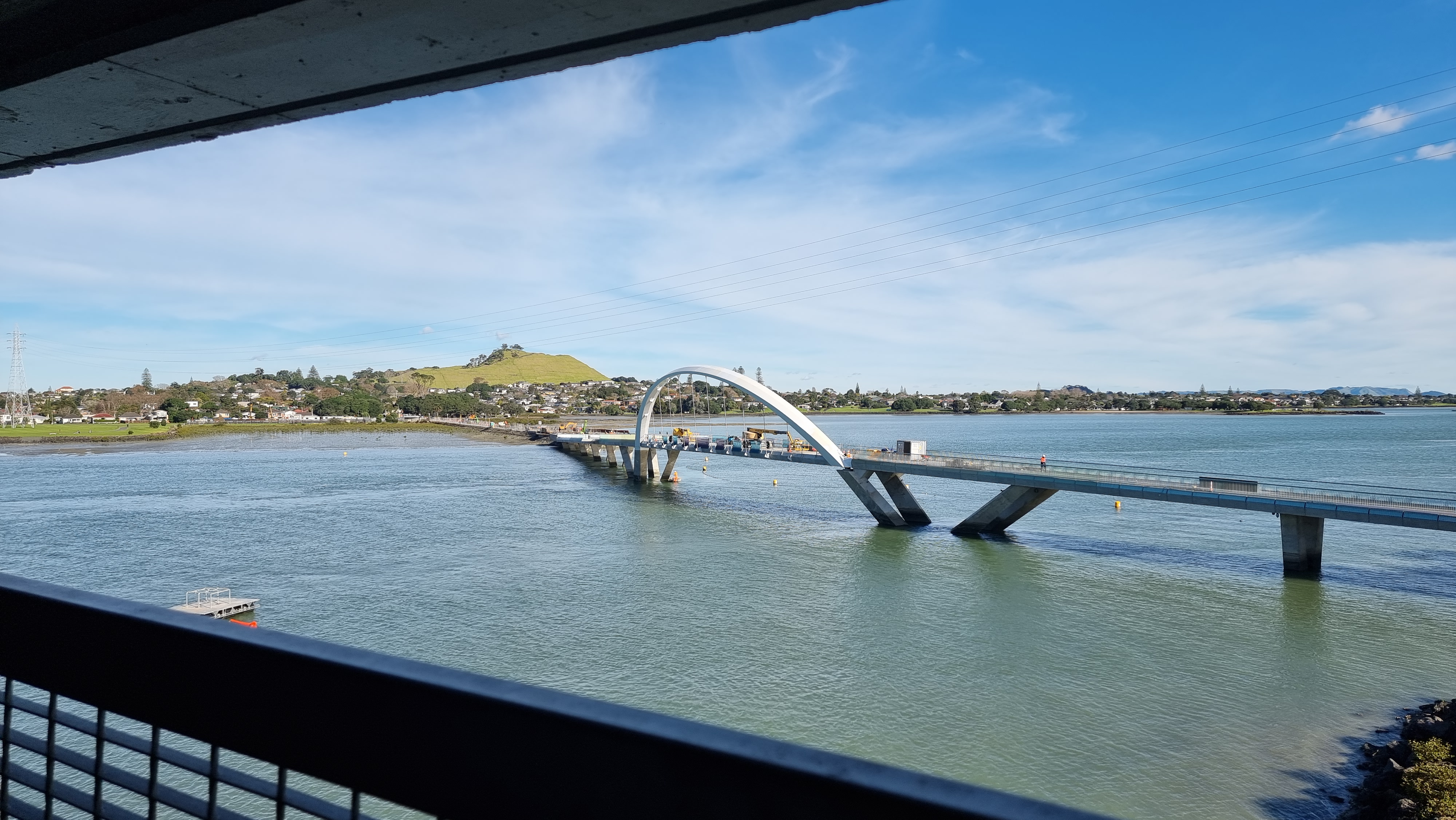
View of Ngā Hau Māngere, the 2022 Māngere Bridge seen from the motorway bridge

Map of the current motorway bridge

Māngere Bridge, officially also called the Manukau Harbour Crossing, is a dual motorway bridge over the Manukau Harbour in south-western Auckland, New Zealand, crossing between the suburb also known as Māngere Bridge (southern side) and the suburb of Onehunga (northern side).

The older portion of the bridge, completed in 1983, carries a four-lane motorway with a (now-closed, since 2022) cycle and pedestrian path suspended under the western side. By 2000, this bridge was carrying 80,000 vehicles daily and had become prone to congestion.

In 2010, a duplication of the 1983 bridge was opened on its eastern side. This doubled the number of general traffic lanes to eight and provided an additional two for buses, for a total capacity of 10 lanes across the harbour. The project had been delayed by disagreements over design and funding, and over the scope of the bridge project and an associated interchange – with the interchange being scaled down after concerns from the local community.

The 1912 walking bridge was replaced with a new walking and cycle bridge in 2022, called Ngā Hau Māngere.

== Original bridges ==
=== Natural causeway and initial bridge ===
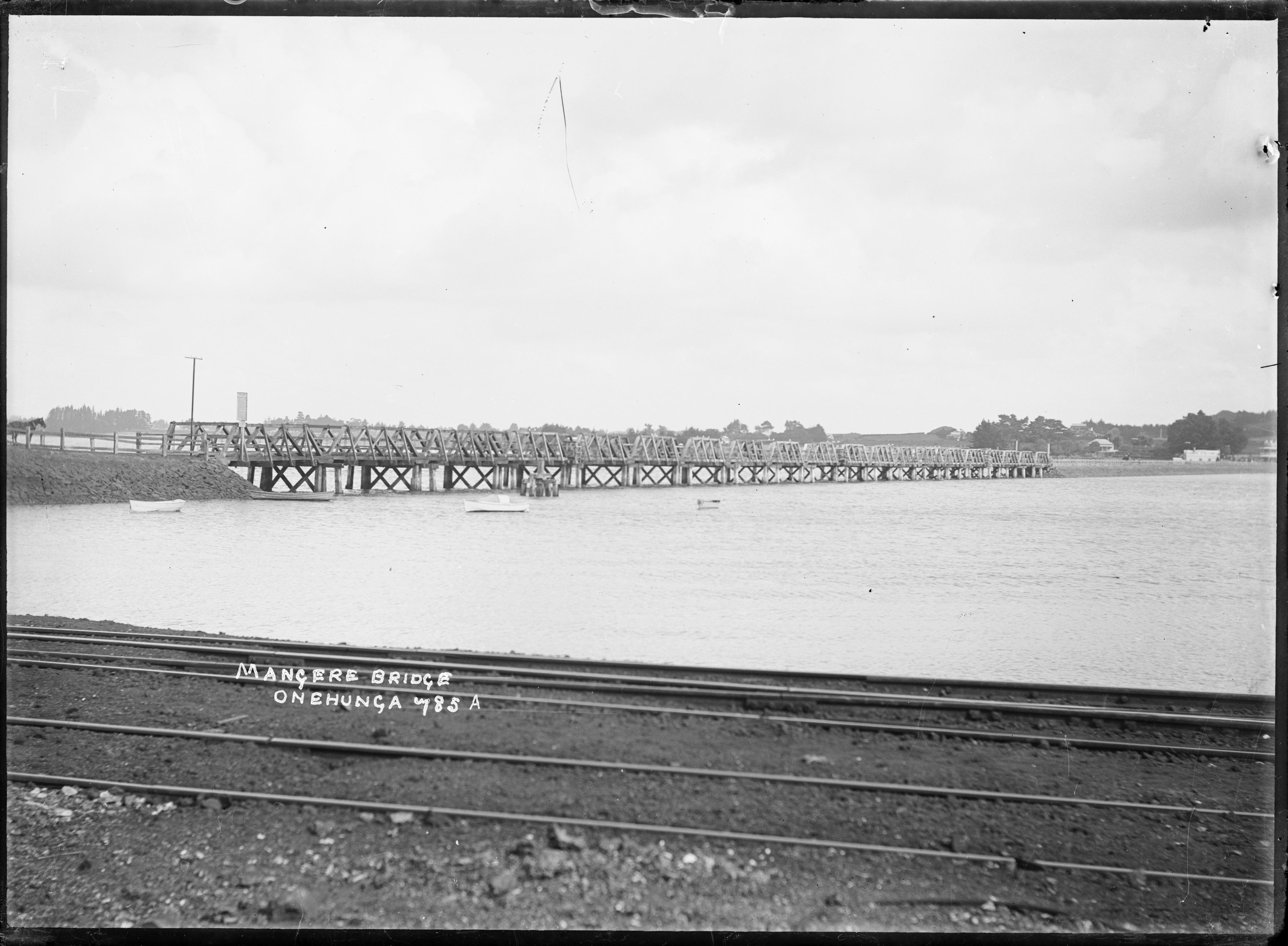
Original wooden bridge circa 1900

The location of the initial bridge was originally a naturally formed basalt rock causeway used by Tāmaki Māori, traversable by foot at low tide (except for a shallow tidal stream of a few metres in width). The causeway connected the two halves of the Ngāti Whātua Māngere-Onehunga kāinga complex in the early 19th Century. In 1847, the first ferry service between Onehunga and Māngere was established, where passengers would need to raise a flag on the Māngere shore to signal the ferry operator. In 1858, a large section of the rock walkway was destroyed with dynamite, to allow for more intensive shipping in the harbour.

In 1866, a company was formed to investigate and construct a bridge between Māngere and Onehunga, funded by a grand provided by the provincial government. Civil engineer James Stewart was announced on 7 August 1866 as the winner of a competition for the bridge's design, however stalled due to the Ngāti Mahuta ownership of the land on the southern side of the proposed bridge location restricting what the company could create. These lands had been seized in 1865 under the New Zealand Settlements Act 1863 during the Invasion of the Waikato, however by 1867 the Native Compensation Court split the 485 acre plot between individuals from Ngāti Mahuta, sold some sections to settlers, and kept other sections as crown reserves.

In 1872, tenders for the development of the bridge were proposed. Designed by the Reverend Dr Arthur Guyon Purchas and opened in January 1875, the narrow timber truss bridge featured 20 spans of 12.2 metres supported by jarrah timber piles from Australia, costing £14,997 to build. The jarrah piles soon began to be attacked by Teredo navalis shipworms, and in 1910, more than 30 of the piles had been replaced, as well as the decking. The bridge was also single-lane, and so narrow that pedestrians could barely pass a vehicle safely. It was often unsuitable for pedestrians due to large number of horses and livestock using the bridge, and for residents in the area, the animals often caused noise issues at night, such as when horses would slip on wet surfaces. The bridge was eventually considered structurally unsound and closed in 1914, before being fully demolished.

=== Old Māngere Bridge ===
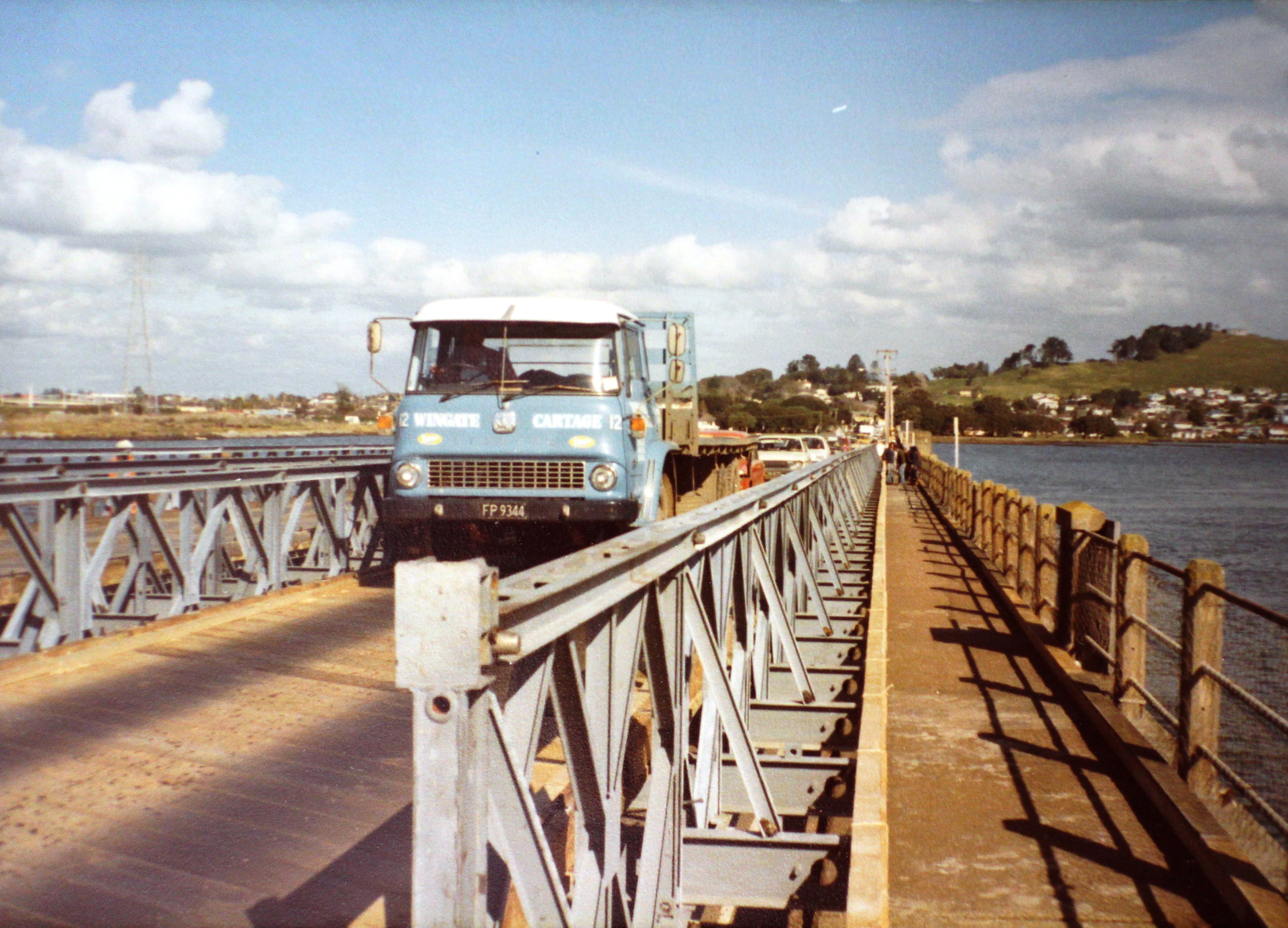
The Old Māngere Bridge, supported by a temporary bailey bridge, circa 1980

A plan to replace the old wooden bridge was adopted by Māngere ratepayers in May 1911. Designed by R.F. Moore, the designer of Grafton Bridge and Queens Wharf, it was also built by the same company, the Ferro-Concrete Company of Australasia (in a time when almost all bridges in the country were being built by the Public Works Department). The 246-metre (807 ft) 17-span ferro-concrete bridge was constructed between 1912 and 1916, and at the time was known as the New Mangere Bridge. In late 1913, scoria from Māngere Mountain was used to create a filled wall on the Māngere side of the bridge, while construction of the ferro-concrete structure continued through 1914 and 1915. The ferro-concrete beams and piles of bridge were created using prefabricated concrete, a very unusual method of construction in New Zealand at the time. This ferro-concrete bridge with driven concrete piles was considered a substantial engineering achievement in its time. With a width of 11.6m, it allowed for a double tram track. The bridge however did not provide for enough clearance to let anything but small boats pass under it. A small section of the bridge opened in January 1915, while construction on the full structure continued and dismantling work on the old bridge began. The bridge was officially opened on 31 May 1915 by Prime Minister William Massey, a resident of Māngere.

By 1927, repair works on the concrete structure were needed due to degradation. In World War II, an anti-tank road block was erected on the bridge near the middle of the spans, with a small sentry shelter close by. These structures were later removed, and it is unclear whether the bridge had also been mined. From 1966, the bridge experienced much higher traffic volumes after the opening of the new Auckland International Airport at Māngere. It soon proved to have too little capacity, and sinking foundation piles created issues. A temporary bailey bridge was erected by the Ministry of Works in 1980, covering the most deteriorated parts of the bridge. The bridge was closed in 1983 to motor vehicles. A 300 ft container transport, the Spirit of Resolution, crashed into the bridge on 8 October 2005 as it attempted to leave a nearby Port of Onehunga berth during winds estimated later as being between 30 and 40 knots (with stronger gusts) and against a strong incoming tide. The collision occurred despite the ship's bow thrusters working at full power and a small harbour tug assisting.

Due to problems with the quality of the concrete and steel, it was initially envisioned that the bridge would be dismantled and replaced by a newly designed footbridge. Due to complaints about this course of action, plans for its removal were not finalised until 2012. Construction of a replacement structure, designed for walking, cycling and fishing, was scheduled for 2015, the centenary of the opening of the old bridge.

=== Ngā Hau Māngere ===
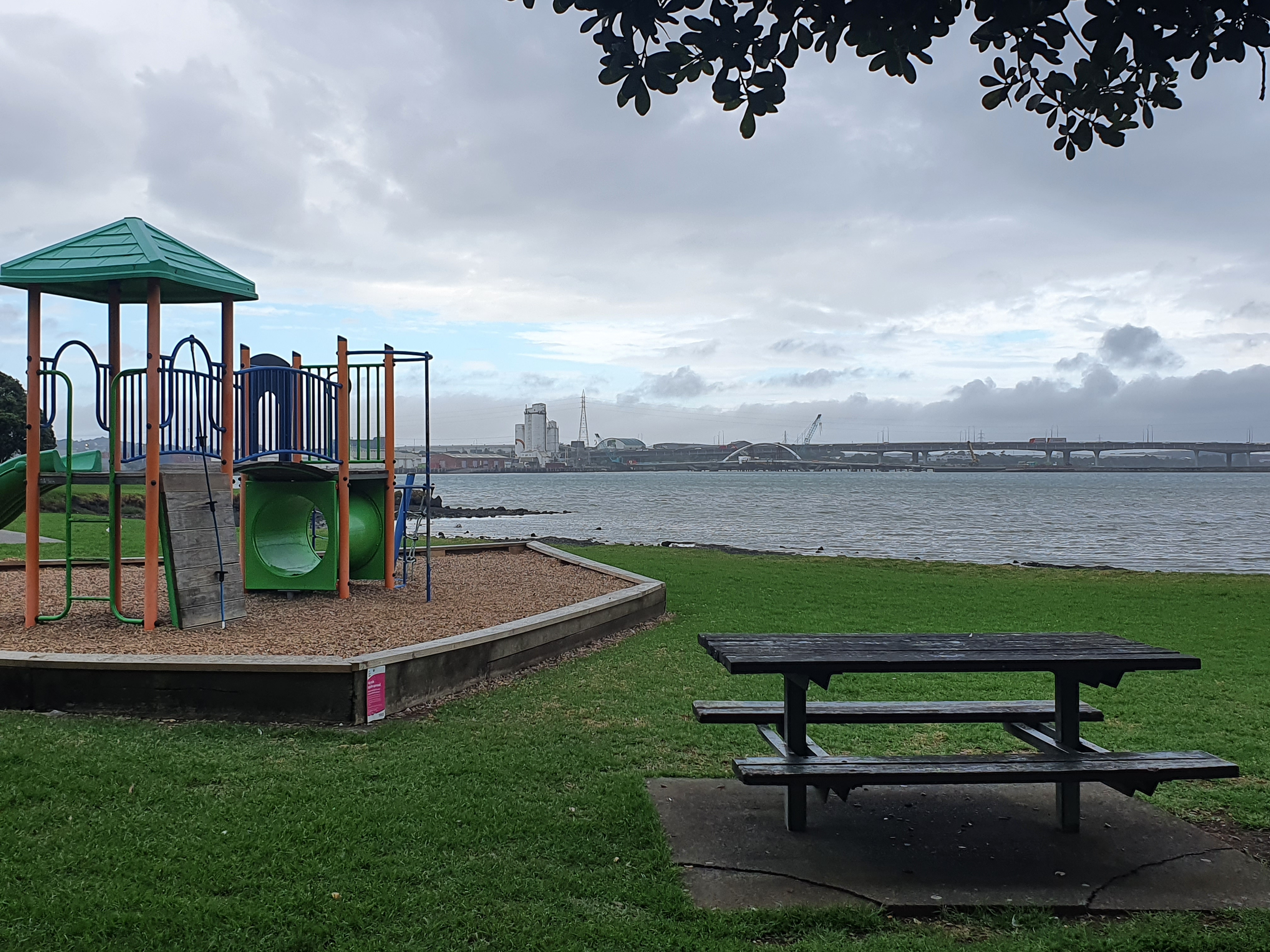
View of the replacement bridge during construction in 2022

The New Zealand Transport agency dismantled the 1912 Māngere Bridge in 2018 due to safety issues. The new bridge, Ngā Hau Māngere, was built on the same abutments as the previous bridge, further from the port and allowing enough clearance for small boats to pass underneath. The bridge is eight metres wide and up to 12 metres wide in some bays to enable fishing activities. Ngā Hau Māngere opened on 27 August 2022.

== Motorway Bridge ==
In 1963, a report by US consultancy firm De Leuw Cather and Co recommended that a motorway and rapid public transport system be developed for Auckland. This included the Southwestern Motorway, a link between the proposed Northwestern and Southern sections that would bypass the city centre, and would involve a large-scale motorway crossing of the Māngere Inlet adjacent to the Old Māngere Bridge. The first section of the Southwestern Motorway, the Onehunga Bypass, was completed in 1977, spanning Queenstown Road in Hillsborough and terminating at the Old Māngere Bridge. Two contracts were let for the construction of the motorway bridge: one to Gilberd Hadfield Pile Co Ltd to construct the foundations, signed on 25 January 1973, and a second for the construction of the bridge structure, awarded to the Wilkins & Davies Development Company Ltd and signed on 24 July 1974. Work was expected to be completed in July 1978. The 650-metre (2,130 ft) bridge was designed as four sections, which are able to move independently during an earthquake.

Construction began in 1972, when preliminary earthworks was undertaken at Te Hopua a Rangi / Gloucester Park. Periods of industrial action by workers began in 1975, becoming increasingly regular over the next few years. In May 1978 the construction halted when workers organised a labour strike over insufficient redundancy payments. The partially constructed bridge was picketed for a period of two and a half years, becoming the then longest continuous labour strike in the history of New Zealand. The contract with Wilkins & Davies Development Company was suspended in July 1978, and a new contract with Fletcher Construction was awarded in November 1980 to finish construction. Eventually, the bridge was opened in February 1983. The strike became the subject of a comedy song by McPhail and Gadsby.

=== Bridge duplication ===
==== Initial funding ====
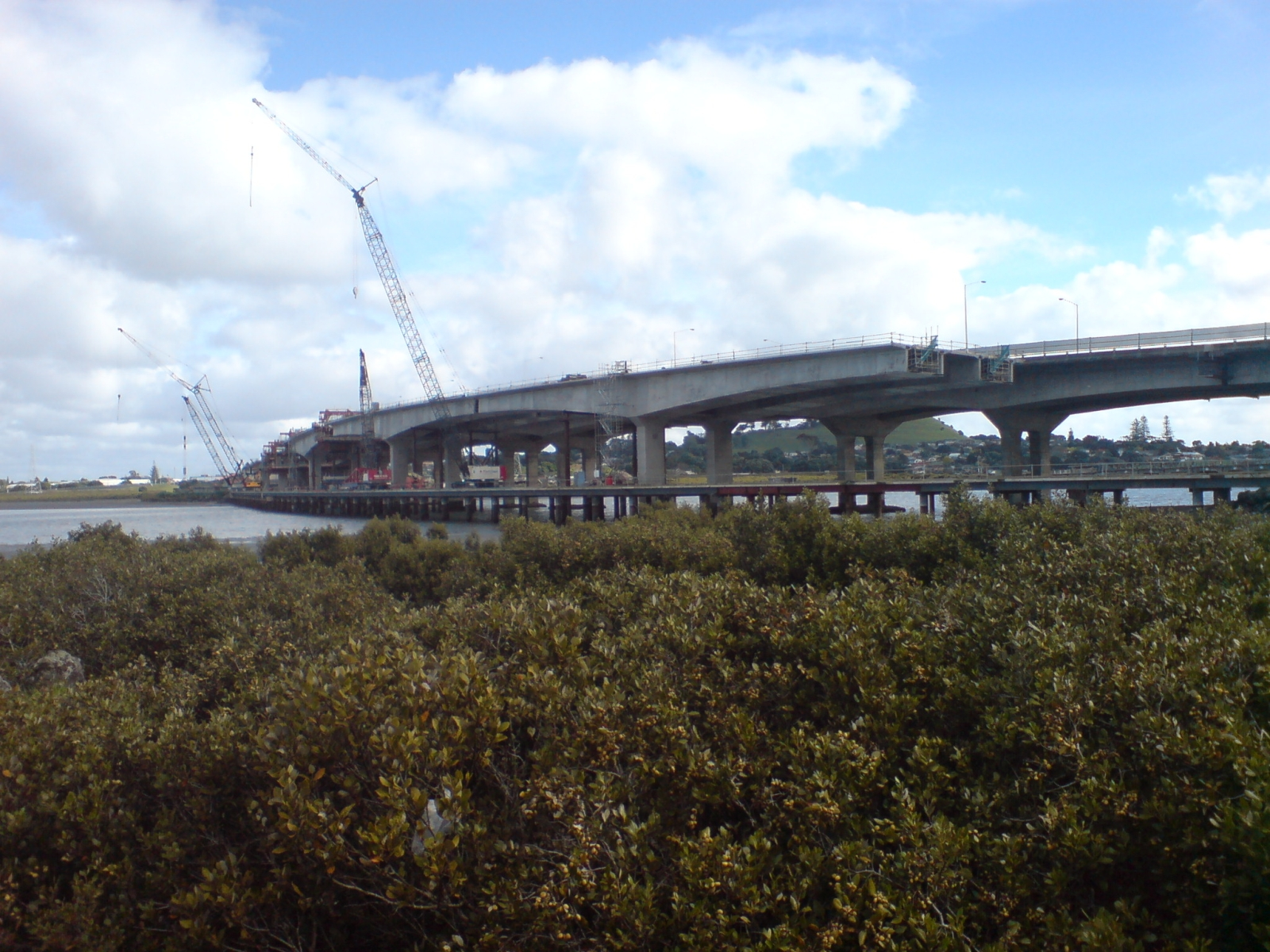
The new bridge being constructed on the eastern side of the existing bridge.

On 17 May 2006, Finance Minister Michael Cullen announced in the Budget that funds were being allocated to Land Transport New Zealand, to help the National Land Transport Programme accelerate certain projects. That included funds for duplication of the 1983 bridge, to its east. The programme indicated that only $2.78 million funding was then approved for investigation of the project, though Transit New Zealand might apply for additional $1.5 million for further investigation of the project. The bridge was at that time expected to cost NZ$330 million.

==== Wider area ====
As a wider part of the Manukau Harbour Crossing Project, the motorway was also to be widened between Walmsley Road in the south and Queenstown Road in the north from four lanes to six lanes. This widening was to predominantly take place to the east of the existing motorway. The Onehunga interchange (known as the Gloucester Park Interchange) was to be significantly reworked, to provide a more logical link with the motorway, and to ease congestion along Onehunga Harbour Drive. A standard diamond interchange was initially chosen by Transit, but after consultation with Auckland City Council this was then reworked into a quarter-diamond design, with the northbound onramp hooking underneath a proposed Neilson Road bridge.

As part of that investigation, Transit considered whether it would have been worthwhile to toll new capacity to assist in funding its construction. This could have been in the form of tolling the new lanes along this route, which would have ensured an untolled alternative was available (as legally required), while the tolled new lanes would be far less congested. In mid 2007, Transit indicated that it would not seek a decision on funding the bridge via road tolls before starting work on construction. Auckland Airport had accused Transit of threatening to defer the project if it could not gain backing from the public and local Councils. As the bridge was to be finished for the 2011 Rugby World Cup, further delays would possibly have resulted in the bridge not being completed in time.

==== Public transport link ====
In early 2007 Transit indicated that it would be "more than willing" to develop the duplicate bridge so that it could accommodate a possible future rail link between the Auckland isthmus and Auckland Airport, which would be completed by extending the defunct Onehunga Branch line (which was in the funding stages of being reopened for passenger traffic and was in fact reopened on 18 September 2010). The railway currently terminates near the northern end of the bridge. A combination solution was debated which would see a rail link use the same bridge foundations. The change came after repeated lobbying by the Auckland Regional Council, which was of the opinion that Transit's initial proposal to simply reserve space alongside the duplicate bridge for a later, but separate, rail bridge was not acceptable.

In September 2007, Auckland Regional Transport Authority proposed to pledge NZ$2.5 million for future-proofing works to ensure that a rail link would be included. The design envisaged the future railway line run on the new bridge piers for part of the distance underneath the motorway structure, thus saving some of the high costs associated with strengthening the bridge to be able to take a cantilevered bridge – estimated at around NZ$20 million in extra costs.

==== Interchange issues ====
In July 2007, Auckland City Council commissioners gave approval to widening the approach motorway for the bridge through Onehunga Bay, but opposed the new interchange design north of the bridge favoured by Transit, which intended to construct it around 7 m high over Gloucester Park and the Hopua volcanic tuff ring. The council's preferred version was to build the interchange at ground level with part of the motorway in a cut and cover tunnel.

The recommendation, which Transit could have ignored only at the risk of drawn-out legal fights at the Environment Court level (which would probably have delayed the project until after the 2011 Rugby World Cup), was based on the concerns of residents, who feared that the new interchange would increase and cement separation of their suburb from the Manukau Harbour. Partly due to this, Transit New Zealand decided in August 2007 to continue with building the new bridge without including a new interchange for the time being.

==== Design ====
Transit New Zealand made provision for a future rail link under both bridges to connect to Auckland Airport, with three of the eight piers constructed strong enough to carry a future rail link.

The bridge has 7 piers with a total of 14 columns, and consists of approximately 10,000 cubic metres of reinforced concrete (with the rebar weighing approximately 1,000 tons). Some of the piles were driven 50m deep, to avoid issues with the softer top layers in the Manukau Harbour. The bridge itself consists of single-pour concrete columns and form traveller-constructed balanced cantilever decks.

The related works also included widening of approximately 4 km of associated motorway to ensure the new bridge capacity would be utilised. Existing pedestrian and cyclist links on the old 1914 bridge closed to motor vehicles were retained and are connected to a shared path along the Mangere Bridge waterfront reserve via a new walking/cycling bridge over Onehunga Harbour Road – linking Onehunga to Mangere Bridge suburb and to the Waikaraka Cycleway.

==== Construction and opening ====
Construction of the new bridge officially began on 9 April 2008, undertaken by the MHX Alliance, a combination of the NZ Transport Agency, Beca Infrastructure, Fletcher Construction and Higgins Contractors. Completion was followed by a temporary closure of the 1983 bridge for refurbishment works, and the bridge was officially opened on 25 July 2010, seven months ahead of schedule. This brought the number of traffic lanes available over the harbour to 10, 2 of them bus shoulder lanes.

==== Ancillary works ====
A number of works related to environmental mitigation, post-project landscaping or improvement of non-motorway transport links were associated with the project (and either paid for or undertaken by NZTA). These included a 3.5m wide replacement foot/cycle bridge over Beachcroft Road, a new 3.5m wide foot/cycle bridge over Onehunga Harbour Road at the Old Mangere Bridge, an upgraded underpass under the motorway connecting to Onehunga, as well as improved links to the walking and cycling paths along the harbour and motorway edges and improvement works on the Old Mangere Bridge causeway. After finishing work, NZTA reinstated their large construction staging site along the southern harbour front as an open space, "passive recreation" park with Pohutukawa.

== See also ==
- Auckland Harbour Bridge
- Panmure Bridge
- Upper Harbour Bridge
