= List of parks in Papatoetoe =

This is a list of public parks in Papatoetoe, a suburb in South Auckland. They are maintained by Auckland Council.

== Allenby Park ==
Allenby Park
- Waenganui
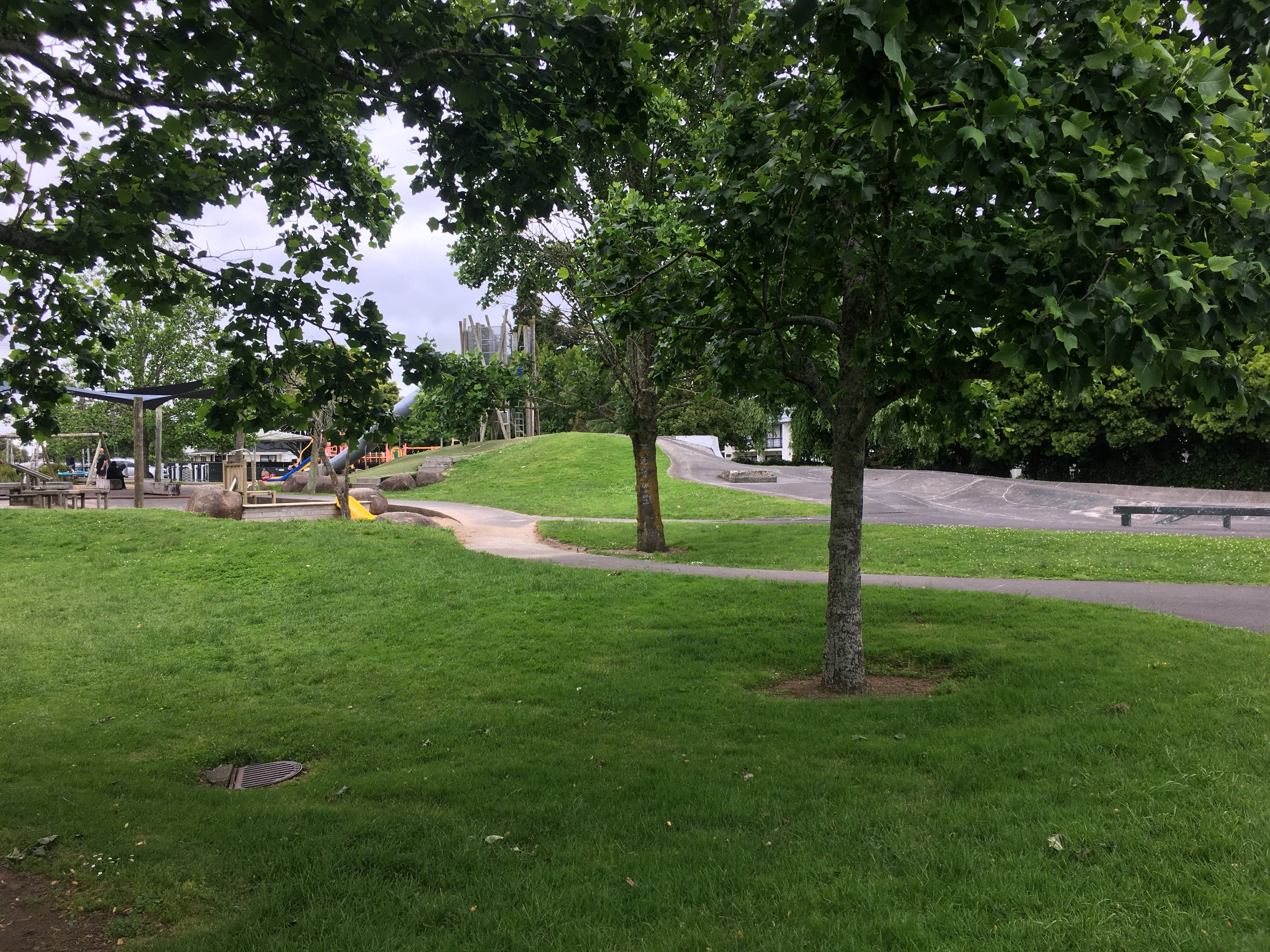
- A photo of Allenby Park in 2023
- Interactive map of Allenby Park
- Type: Public park
- Location: Auckland, New Zealand
- Coordinates: 36.97897°S 174.87196°E
- Area: 94 hectares (230 acres)
- Operator: Auckland Council
- Status: Open year round

Allenby Park, also known as Waenganui, is located across the road from co-ed secondary school, Papatoetoe High School's Carlie Street entrance and is surrounded by residential area. Waenganui is inspired by a Māori proverb, a whakatauki, which represents the boundaries of Papatoetoe. It is frequented by many recreational activities and local events. Allenby was opened in the early 2000s and is in zone to Papatoetoe High School, Papatoetoe Central Primary School and South Auckland Seventh Day Adventist School. Allenby Park is located nearby to many churches such as Saint Addai Chaldean Catholic Church, Manukau City Baptist Church, Holy Cross Catholic Church and Redeemer Grace Presbyterian Church. As of the 18th of May 2021, local parks around Auckland adopted Māori names given by the mana whenua as part of the council’s cultural identity programme, Te Kete Rukuruku.

It is characterised by the steep drop of the skate park and exuberant playground which includes a 2.7m high slide and robust Totara sand play tables. In 2016, residents and regular park goers saw a change in the playground with new infrastructure being built and old frames being replaced. A new sand area was introduced for young kids to play in and the upgrades included a climbing tower for the older kids. The tower was designed to look like the Kiwi kid's classic game, Pick Up sticks.

One of the biggest parks in Manukau City, Allenby Park is also known for the sports facilities such as a volleyball net, cricket pitch and open fields for Guyfawkes celebrations. In the past, Allenby Park has been used to host the Zirka Circus, Bubble Soccer, the Gypsy Travellers Market and Summer Skate Series.

== Burnside Park ==
Burnside Park
- Interactive map of Burnside Park
- Type: Public park
- Location: Auckland, New Zealand
- Coordinates: 36.97970°S 174.85523°E
- Operator: Auckland Council
- Status: Open year round

Burnside Park is located in central Papatoetoe outside of the Papatoetoe War Memorial Library and nearby the Papatoetoe Railway Station. Originally known as the St George Gardens, in 2004 the park was renamed to recognise the contributions the Burnside family had made to Papatoetoe in the 20th century. On 2 December 1995, a town mural was unveiled at the park. Painted by Ron Van Dam, this was the first mural created for the Old Papatoetoe mural trail.

== Gordon Park ==
Gordon Park
- Interactive map of Gordon Park
- Type: Public park
- Location: Auckland, New Zealand
- Coordinates: 36.97158°S 174.84442°E
- Operator: Auckland Council
- Status: Open year round

Gordon Park is a small field within residential area located on the opposite side of the Papatoetoe Train Station train tracks from Swaffield Park. The park doesn't have any playground or play equipment but is instead a large open area. KiwiRail and Auckland Transport have been working to maintain and improve Auckland's busy rail network throughout mid 2023 till now and as a result, Gordan Park has been under construction as a part of the ongoing Southern Line upgrade work.

== Hillside Park ==
Hillside Park
- Interactive map of Hillside Park
- Type: Public park
- Location: Auckland, New Zealand
- Coordinates: 36.97897°S 174.87196°E
- Operator: Auckland Council
- Status: Open year round
- Website: https://www.aucklandcouncil.govt.nz/parks-recreation/Pages/park-details.aspx?Location=965

Hillside Park, also known as Ō-haemanga which means the 'place of the ravine' referring to an old ravine which used to be on this reserve, is a small park located off Hillside Road. This small residential park is surrounded by trees and features a playground, fitness equipment and seating. The park is accessible via Hillside Road and Rapley Place.

== Kingswood Road Reserve ==
Kingswood Road Reserve
- Interactive map of Kingswood Road Reserve
- Type: Public park
- Location: Auckland, New Zealand
- Coordinates: 36.97764°S 174.84667°E
- Operator: Auckland Council
- Status: Open year round

Kingswood Road Reserve is situated nearby to Papatoetoe Rugby Football Club and Samoan Baptist Church Papatoetoe. The reserve is off of Kingswood Road and is connected to the Papatoetoe Recreational Ground. The reserve can be accessed via Wylie Road and Guide Place. Playcentre Papatoetoe is an early childhood education organisation located along Guide Place who also have 420 branches located throughout New Zealand. Also located along Guide Place is a community centre for the Walk by Faith Charitable Trust. This trust is dedicated to encouraging young people to embrace healthy lifestyles and raising awareness about thrombosis.

== Kimpton Park ==
Kimpton Park
- Interactive map of Kimpton Park
- Type: Public park
- Location: Auckland, New Zealand
- Coordinates: 36.97016°S 174.87491°E
- Operator: Auckland Council
- Status: Open year round

Kimpton Park, also known as Toetoe-nui, is a located off Kimpton Road and sits along the border of State Highway 1. The park is accessible via Cornwall Road and Plymouth Place. Kimpton Park is situated near to Papatoetoe South Primary School and 580 metres behind Papatoetoe High School. The park's Te Reo name is a literal translation of 'large toetoe', or 'many toetoe which is derived from the features of the land, affiliated with Ngāti Tamaoho, the park sits on.

== Kohuora Park ==
Kohuora Park
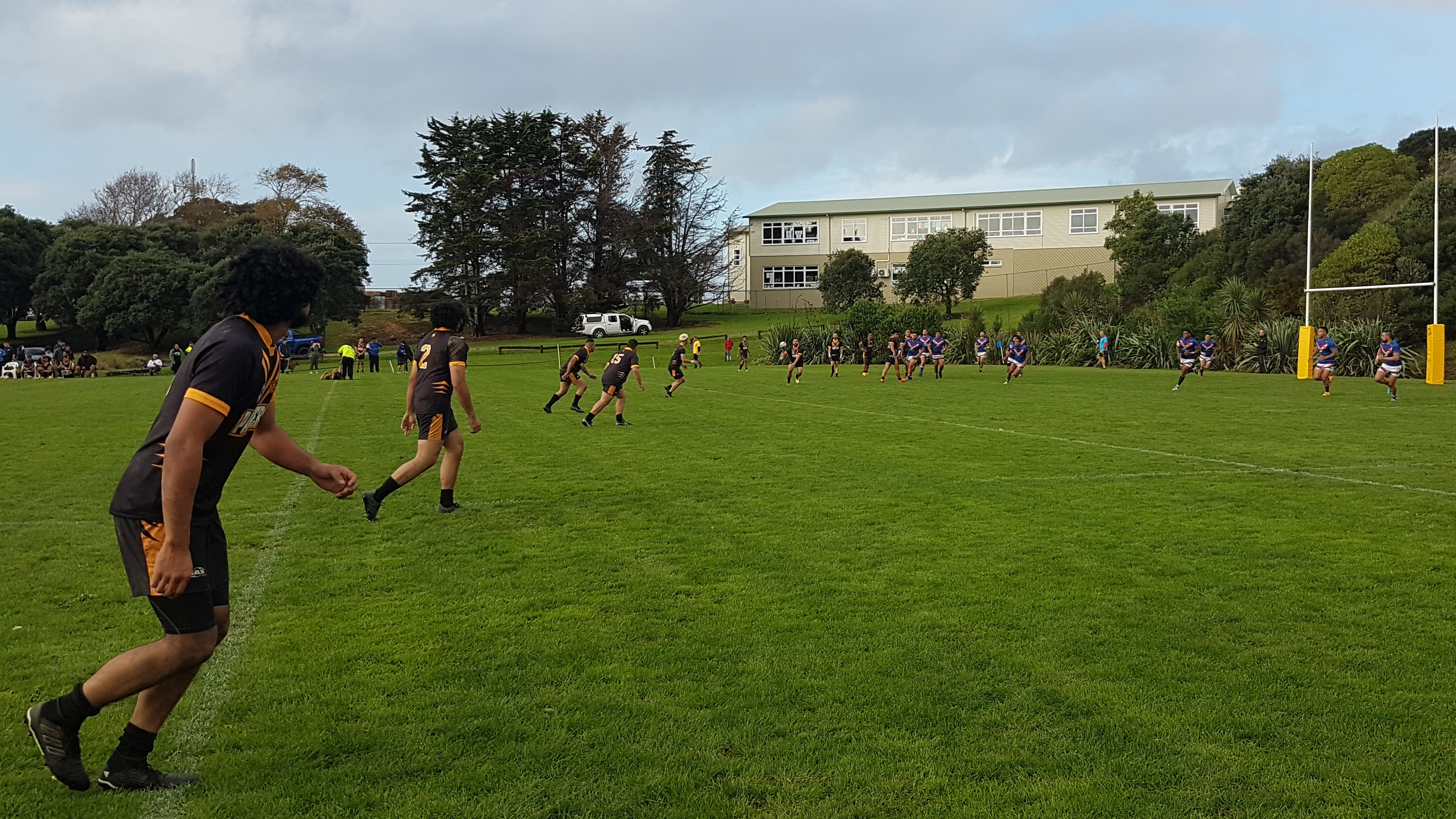
- The Papatoetoe Panthers facing the Te Atatu Roosters at Kohuora Park in 2022
- Interactive map of Kohuora Park
- Type: Public park
- Location: Auckland, New Zealand
- Coordinates: 36.9788°S 174.8439°E
- Operator: Auckland Council
- Status: Open year round

Kohuora Park, also known as Glenmary Place Reserve, is located in western Papatoetoe, adjacent to Papatoetoe West School and not too far from the Papatoetoe train station. The Māori name translates to "the Living Mist", and is named for Kohuora, an extinct volcano located in the park. The crater is 30m deep and according to tradition, it was created by Matāoho the giant Waiōhua God, whose footsteps gave rise to the volcanoes of Tāmaki Mākaurau.

The park features a short loop path which is accessible via Lendenfeld Drive. The path is flat and suitable for all ages and abilities, including families and those in wheelchairs. This path takes you through and around the crater, showcasing the wetland that is the habitat for many indigenous bird and plant species including pūkeko, pied stilt (poaka), pied shag (kāruhiruhi), kingfisher (kotare) and White-faced heron (mataku-moana).

There is a toddler-friendly playground as well as an off-leash dog exercise area. It is also home to the Papatoetoe Panthers rugby league club.

== Murdoch Park ==
Murdoch Park
- Interactive map of Murdoch Park
- Type: Public park
- Location: Auckland, New Zealand
- Coordinates: 36.98797°S 174.85075°E
- Operator: Auckland Council
- Status: Open year round

Murdoch Park is located adjacent to Papatoetoe South School and Murdoch Park Kindergarten, which is an early childhood educational centre affiliated with the Auckland Kindergarten Association that was established on 8 October 1908, with the aim of providing free kindergarten services to Auckland. Murdoch Park is home to the Papatoetoe Association Football Club which was formed in 1959 and incorporated in 1964. On the 22nd of August 2022, Papatoetoe AFC became one of the latest clubs to form a partnership with Friends of Football, an organisation founded in 2013 by former All White, Brian Turner.

== Omana Park ==
Omana Park
- Interactive map of Omana Park
- Type: Public park
- Location: Auckland, New Zealand
- Coordinates: 36.96754°S 174.85487°E
- Operator: Auckland Council
- Status: Open year round

Omana Park, also known as Omana Road Reserve, is located in Otara-Papatoetoe adjacent to The Grange Golf Course. The park is known for its lengthy routes that run behind residential area and towards Great South Road as well as its substantial amount of land, perfect for sports games and athletics. Nearby primary schools host their annual Childrens Papatoetoe Ribbon Day, a sports day organised by Athletics Auckland, at Omana Park and this usually runs throughout an entire day.

The Papatoetoe Amateur Athletics & Harriers Club is a family-oriented club located at Omana which trains teams to compete in the Colgate Games. These games are held annually in January and feature two events: one in the North Island and one in the South Island.

== Pā o Tahi / Hillside South Park ==
Pā o Tahi / Hillside South Park
- Interactive map of Pā o Tahi / Hillside South Park
- Type: Public park
- Location: Auckland, New Zealand
- Coordinates: 36.98932°S 174.84163°E
- Operator: Auckland Council
- Status: Open year round

Pā o Tahi / Hillside South Park is close to the Cemetery Crater, one of the volcanoes of Auckland. It is the location of Kohuora Pā, one of the few known pā sites in South Auckland. The park's Te Reo name is abbreviated from 'Te Pā-o-te-tū-tahi-atu’ which refers to the site as a temporary pāor lone settlement as the surrounding landscape was not ideal for settlement. This was a result of there being a lack in height and resources in comparison with the other hilltop sites nearby.

== Papatoetoe Recreation Ground ==
Papatoetoe Recreation Ground
- Interactive map of Papatoetoe Recreation Ground
- Type: Public park
- Location: Auckland, New Zealand
- Coordinates: 36.97365°S 174.86151°E
- Operator: Auckland Council
- Status: Open year round

The Papatoetoe Recreation Ground, also known as Papatoetoe Recreation Reserve, is located adjacent to Papatoetoe Central School and is the home ground for local sports clubs and recreational activities. It was opened in 1909 by the Papatoetoe and Surrounding Districts Progressive League, who bought a 5 acres (2.0 ha) section of the former Kolmar Estate to create a community sports ground. Today, the park is xcolloquially called the "Rec", and cricket began to be played here from 1910, followed by rugby in 1946 and football in the 1950s. The grounds were levelled in the 1930s during the Great Depression. The grounds underwent another upgrade in May 2023 with changes to the lighting, new irrigation, new drainage, sand slit and sand carpeted couch fields.

Kolmar Sports Centre is a sport, recreation and leisure centre that, by providing quality facilities at the Papatoetoe Recreation ground, aims to allow each sports code to lift their profile in the community and in turn attract young people to the games. In 2013, the Papatoetoe Sports Centre was recognised as the Most Outstanding Recreation Facility in New Zealand at the 2013 New Zealand Recreation Association (NZRA) Awards in Rotoura.

Kolmar Sports Centre functions as the Home of Southern district sports and the community (see table below).

| Year of creation | Sports and Clubs |
|---|---|
| 1912 | Papatoetoe Contract Bridge Club |
| 1960 | Papatoetoe Hunters Corner Bowls Inc |
| 1905 | Papatoetoe Cricket Club |
| 1996 | Papatoetoe United Football Club |
| 1910 | GirlGuiding New Zealand – Manukau Puhinui District |
| 1927 | Southern Districts Hockey Club |
| 2013 | Papatoetoe Kabaddi Club |
| 1977 | Papatoetoe Rangers Netball Club |
| 1960s | Manukau Radio Club |
| 1946 | Papatoetoe Rugby Football Club |
| 1940s | St George Scouts Group |
| 1880 | Papatoetoe Tennis Club |
| 2012 | Papatoetoe Olympic Weightlifting Club |

Kolmar underwent an $12M sports facility upgrade in 2021 which introduced features such as: new three-lane indoor cricket training centre, strength training room with associated changing room facilities, reception and administration offices, multi-use meeting and community areas, two flexible function and lounge areas, kitchen and bar facilities for 300 capacity gatherings, individual and small-scale external balcony areas viewing over the Kingswood Road Reserve with six changing rooms for sports teams.

== Puhinui Domain ==
Puhinui Domain
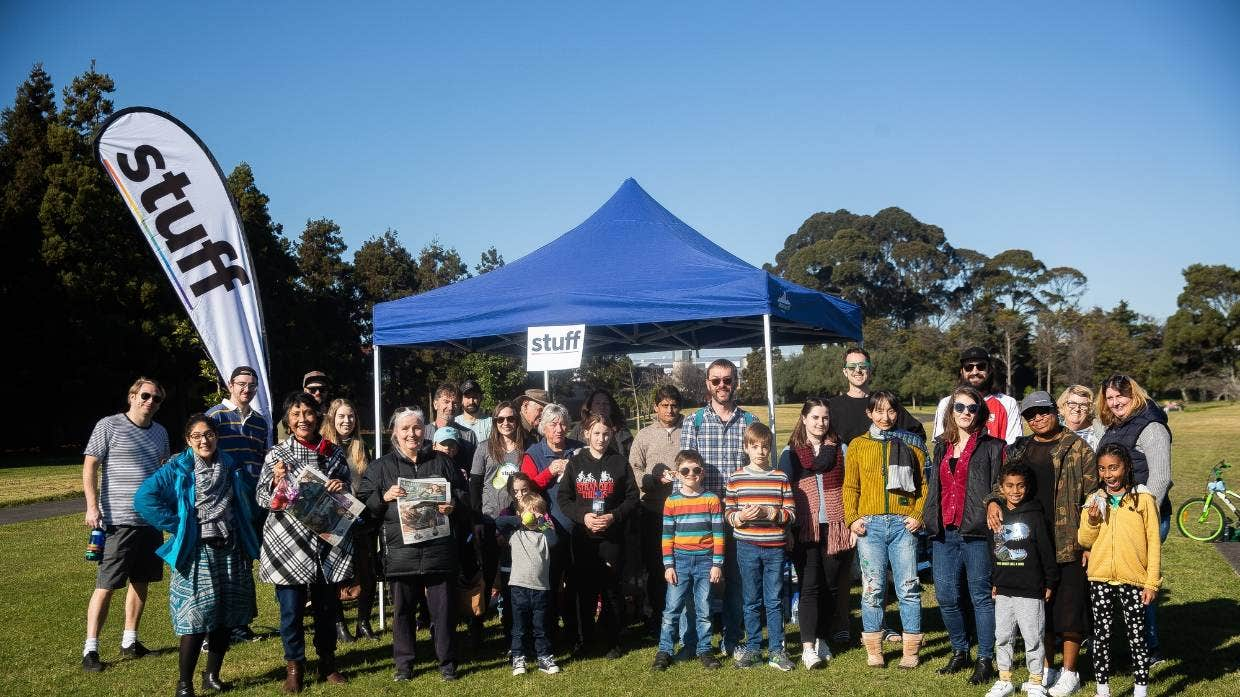
- A post-tornado sausage sizzle at Puhinui Domain, hosted by Stuff.
- Interactive map of Puhinui Domain
- Type: Public park
- Location: Papatoetoe, Auckland, New Zealand
- Coordinates: 36.99000°S 174.86427°E
- Operator: Auckland Council
- Status: Open year round

Puhinui Domain is situated nearby to Manukau Elim Christian Church and the mosque, Masjid At-Taqwa. It is suitable for walking and is celebrated for its natural scenery. There are also facilities such as picnic tables, parking spaces and a basketball court. In May 2022, Auckland Council created the Te Whakaoranga o Te Puhinui project with the purpose of regenerating Manukau’s blue and green networks by working together to restore the Puhinui Stream into a thriving, inclusive and culturally led space for the community. Since the project started, Puhinui Domain has been highlighted through educational talks and has also hosted volunteer tree planting.

On the 7th of September in 2022, Team Trees and Auckland Council Impounded Animals came together to host a tree planting project in Auckland to help reach New Zealand's goal of a 30% tree canopy by 2050. This led to new trees being planted by volunteers across four different locations, one of the four being the Puhinui Domain, for Kiwis to enjoy.

In mid-June 2021, a freak tornado took over Papatoetoe by tearing apart fences, power lines and roofs. Residents spent weeks cleaning up the scrummage with volunteers from the local communities joining in to help. On the 27th of June, the group took a break from the cleanup to get together in the Puhinui Domain for a sausage sizzle hosted by Stuff and supported by the Mad Butcher and Countdown. This was a way for residents affected, by the "costliest tornado on record" as reported by Tim Grafton, chief executive of the Insurance Council, to weather the storm together.

== Robert White Park ==
Robert White Park
- Interactive map of Robert White Park
- Type: Public park
- Location: Papatoetoe, Auckland, New Zealand
- Coordinates: 36.98569°S 174.84408°E
- Operator: Auckland Council
- Status: Open year round

Robert White Park is located off Pah Road and nearby to the Waokauri Creek. It is home to the Papatoetoe Softball Club. The park is named after Bob White who was mayor of Papatoetoe from 1965 to 1986.

== Stadium Reserve ==
Stadium Reserve
- Interactive map of Stadium Reserve
- Type: Public park
- Location: Auckland, New Zealand
- Coordinates: 36.9813°S 174.8526°E
- Operator: Auckland Council
- Status: Open year round

Stadium Reserve, also known as Wallace Road Reserve, was opened in 1929, after the Papatoetoe Town Board purchased land between Wallace Road and the railway for recreational purposes in 1926. Upon opening, the park featured a band rotunda, which was later removed. On 24 October 1932, the Papatoetoe Cycling Stadium was opened at the park, constructed by labourers during the Great Depression. The velodrome was regarded as one of the best in New Zealand and was used as a training track for cyclists during the 1950 British Empire Games. The velodrome was joined by lawn bowls greens in 1954, croquet greens in 1957, and a roller-skating rink in 1959, which was enclosed in 1976 and demolished in 2013.

The stadium was closed in the late 1980s, and replaced by the Allan Brewster Leisure Centre, a community fitness centre which opened on 26 May 1990. Four years later, the centre was renamed in honour of the final mayor of Papatoetoe, Allan Brewster. The centre was damaged in a fire in 2019. The centre featured the Spotlight Theatre, first opened in August 1990 and operated by the Papatoetoe Light Opera Company, who changed their name to Manukau Performing Arts in 1997. In 2009, Manukau Performing Arts undertook a major redevelopment of the theatre.

From June 2023, Eke Panuku began redeveloping the park.

== Sunnyside Domain ==
Sunnyside Domain
- Interactive map of Sunnyside Domain
- Type: Public park
- Location: Papatoetoe, Auckland, New Zealand
- Coordinates: 36.98365°S 174.86370°E
- Operator: Auckland Council
- Status: Open year round

Sunnyside Domain is a small park located within residential area and also known as the home of the Sunnyside Tennis Club, which is a family orientated tennis club accessible via York Road. This park is suitable for walking and picnics and also features sports facilities such as a tennis court park and playgrounds. The Sunnyside Domain Hall is also located here with walking access through two right of ways on Elizabeth Avenue and Victoria Street.

== Water supply for parks ==
As of December 2023, Auckland's water supply is currently stable. This means there is a sufficient amount to get the city through the next term. As a result of this, Auckland Council's Watercare section has increased the proportion of water being supplied to parks around Auckland. Events in April 2021 contradict this as Auckland Council faced backlash over alleged failure to properly maintain the water maintenance at Western Springs Park.

In 2022, Auckland Council created the Auckland Water Strategy to protect and enhance te mauri o te wai: the life-sustaining essence of water.
