= Māngere =

- Suburb
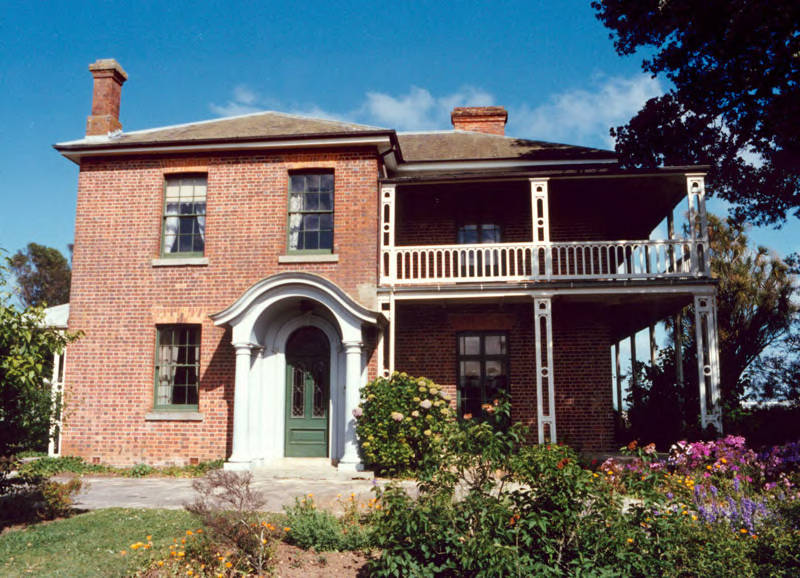
- Massey Homestead, the former residence of William Massey prime minister of New Zealand and notable resident of Māngere
- Etymology: Maung' Re
- Interactive map of Māngere
- Coordinates: 36°58′S 174°48′E
- Country: New Zealand
- City: Auckland
- Local authority: Auckland Council
- Electoral ward: Manukau ward
- Local board: Māngere-Ōtāhuhu Local Board

Area
  - Land: 3,210 ha (7,900 acres)

Population (June 2025)
  - Total: 23,310
  - Density: 726/km^{2} (1,880/sq mi)
- Postcode: 2022
- Train stations: Māngere railway station (1908–2011)
- Airports: Auckland Airport

| Māngere Bridge | Favona | Māngere East |
| (Puketutu Island) | Māngere | Māngere East |
| Airport Oaks | (Manukau Harbour) | Wiri |

Māngere (Māori pronunciation: [ˈmaːŋɛɾɛ]) is a major suburb in South Auckland, New Zealand, located on mainly flat land on the northeastern shore of the Manukau Harbour, to the northwest of Manukau City Centre and 15 kilometres (9.3 miles) south of the Auckland city centre. It is the location of Auckland Airport, which lies close to the harbour's edge to the south of the suburb.

The area has been inhabited by Tāmaki Māori since early periods of Māori history, including large-scale agricultural stonefields, such as Ihumātao, and Māngere Mountain, which was home to a fortified pā. Te Ākitai Waiohua communities in Māngere thrived in the 1840s and 1850s after the establishment of a Wesleyan Mission and extensive wheat farms, until the Invasion of the Waikato in 1863. Māngere remained a rural community until the mid-20th Century, when Māngere became one of the largest state housing developments in Auckland.

== Etymology ==
The name Māngere is a shortened form of the Māori language name Ngā Hau Māngere, a name given to the area by Taikehu, one of the rangatira of the Tainui canoe, referring to the gentle breezes in the area. The spelling of the area was inconsistent in English in the 19th century, with Māngere variously spelt Mangere, Mangerei or Mangare. The spelling Mangere became more consistently used after 1897, when the post office began using this spelling. In 2019, the name of the suburb was officially gazetted as Māngere, with a macron.

Central Māngere was traditionally known by the name Taotaoroa, or "The Extensive Plains".

== Geography ==
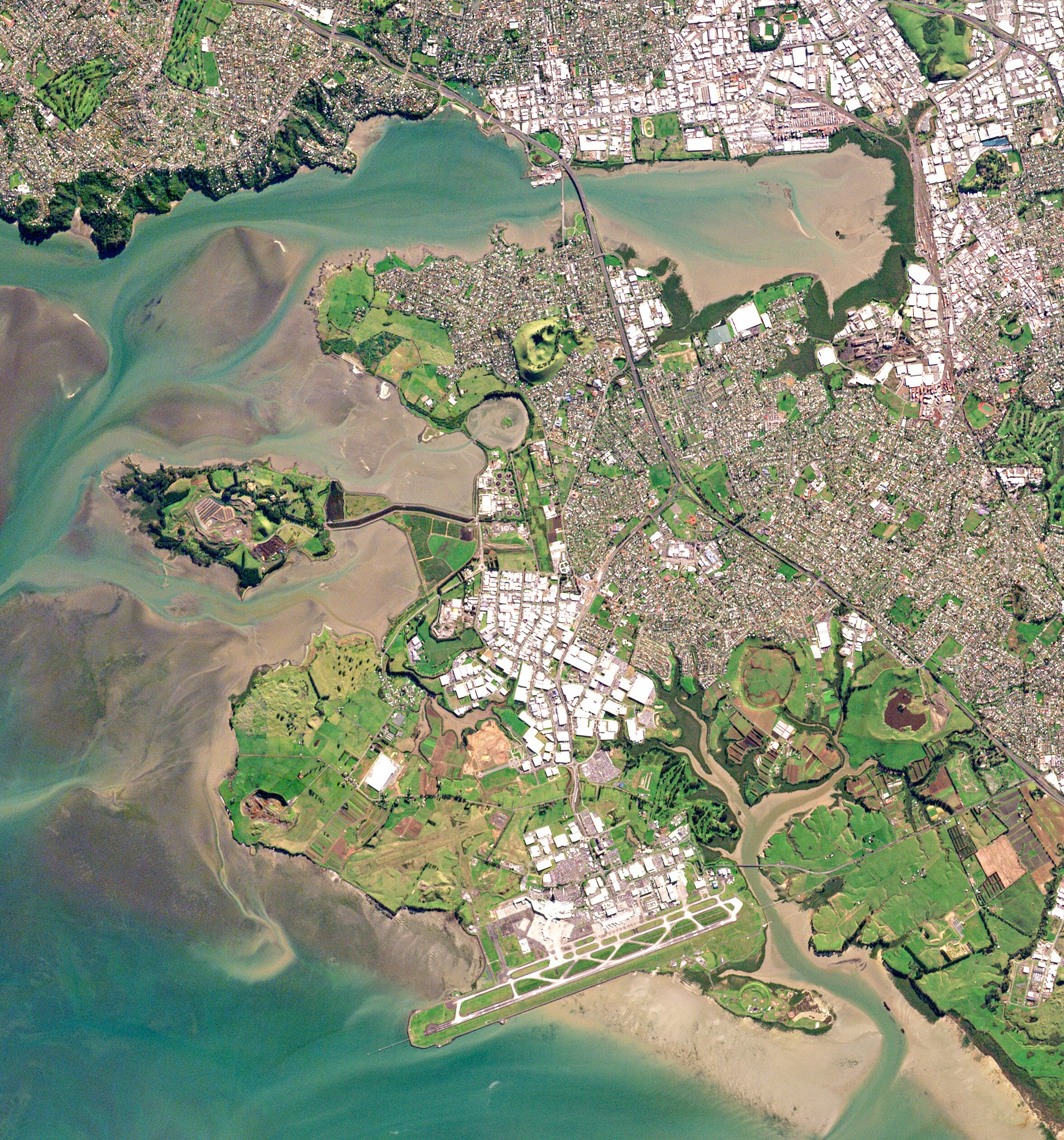
Aerial view of the Māngere peninsula in 2016

Māngere is a peninsula of the Manukau Harbour, south of the Auckland isthmus. Many features of the Auckland volcanic field can be found around Māngere, most visibly Māngere Mountain, an 106-metre volcanic cone to the north-west. The oldest known feature is the Boggust Park Crater, which erupted an estimated 130,000 years ago, while the most recent feature is Waitomokia, which erupted around 20,300 years before the present. The low-lying volcanic features of the area, such as the Māngere Lagoon, Crater Hill, and Pukaki Lagoon were collectively known by the name Nga Tapuwae a Mataoho ("The Sacred Footprints of Mataoho") to Tāmaki Māori peoples, referring to the deity who was involved in their creation.

A number of waterways are found in the area, including the Tararata Creek and Harania Creek which drain into the Māngere Inlet in the north, and Pukaki Creek and Waokauri Creek in the south.

=== Climate ===
Climate data for Mangere (1991–2020 normals, extremes 1959–present)
| Month | Jan | Feb | Mar | Apr | May | Jun | Jul | Aug | Sep | Oct | Nov | Dec | Year |
|---|---|---|---|---|---|---|---|---|---|---|---|---|---|
| Record high °C (°F) | 29.7 (85.5) | 30.5 (86.9) | 28.1 (82.6) | 26.7 (80.1) | 24.5 (76.1) | 21.7 (71.1) | 19.2 (66.6) | 21.3 (70.3) | 22.8 (73.0) | 23.5 (74.3) | 26.8 (80.2) | 27.9 (82.2) | 30.5 (86.9) |
| Mean maximum °C (°F) | 27.3 (81.1) | 27.4 (81.3) | 26.0 (78.8) | 24.2 (75.6) | 21.3 (70.3) | 18.6 (65.5) | 17.6 (63.7) | 18.3 (64.9) | 19.4 (66.9) | 21.3 (70.3) | 23.4 (74.1) | 25.6 (78.1) | 27.7 (81.9) |
| Mean daily maximum °C (°F) | 23.6 (74.5) | 24.3 (75.7) | 22.7 (72.9) | 20.5 (68.9) | 17.8 (64.0) | 15.5 (59.9) | 14.7 (58.5) | 15.2 (59.4) | 16.4 (61.5) | 17.7 (63.9) | 19.5 (67.1) | 21.8 (71.2) | 19.1 (66.5) |
| Daily mean °C (°F) | 19.9 (67.8) | 20.4 (68.7) | 18.7 (65.7) | 16.6 (61.9) | 14.2 (57.6) | 12.1 (53.8) | 11.1 (52.0) | 11.8 (53.2) | 13.0 (55.4) | 14.4 (57.9) | 16.1 (61.0) | 18.4 (65.1) | 15.6 (60.0) |
| Mean daily minimum °C (°F) | 16.1 (61.0) | 16.5 (61.7) | 14.8 (58.6) | 12.7 (54.9) | 10.5 (50.9) | 8.7 (47.7) | 7.5 (45.5) | 8.3 (46.9) | 9.6 (49.3) | 11.0 (51.8) | 12.7 (54.9) | 14.9 (58.8) | 11.9 (53.5) |
| Mean minimum °C (°F) | 10.8 (51.4) | 11.4 (52.5) | 9.5 (49.1) | 6.4 (43.5) | 4.0 (39.2) | 1.9 (35.4) | 1.0 (33.8) | 2.6 (36.7) | 3.8 (38.8) | 5.8 (42.4) | 7.8 (46.0) | 10.2 (50.4) | 0.5 (32.9) |
| Record low °C (°F) | 6.8 (44.2) | 4.4 (39.9) | 3.4 (38.1) | 1.7 (35.1) | −0.3 (31.5) | −1.5 (29.3) | −2.2 (28.0) | −2.0 (28.4) | −0.1 (31.8) | 1.9 (35.4) | 3.3 (37.9) | 6.3 (43.3) | −2.2 (28.0) |
| Average rainfall mm (inches) | 55.4 (2.18) | 59.1 (2.33) | 85.4 (3.36) | 91.9 (3.62) | 113.4 (4.46) | 123.7 (4.87) | 136.8 (5.39) | 116.9 (4.60) | 103.8 (4.09) | 81.9 (3.22) | 62.5 (2.46) | 80.3 (3.16) | 1,111.1 (43.74) |
Source: NIWA

== History ==
=== Māori history ===
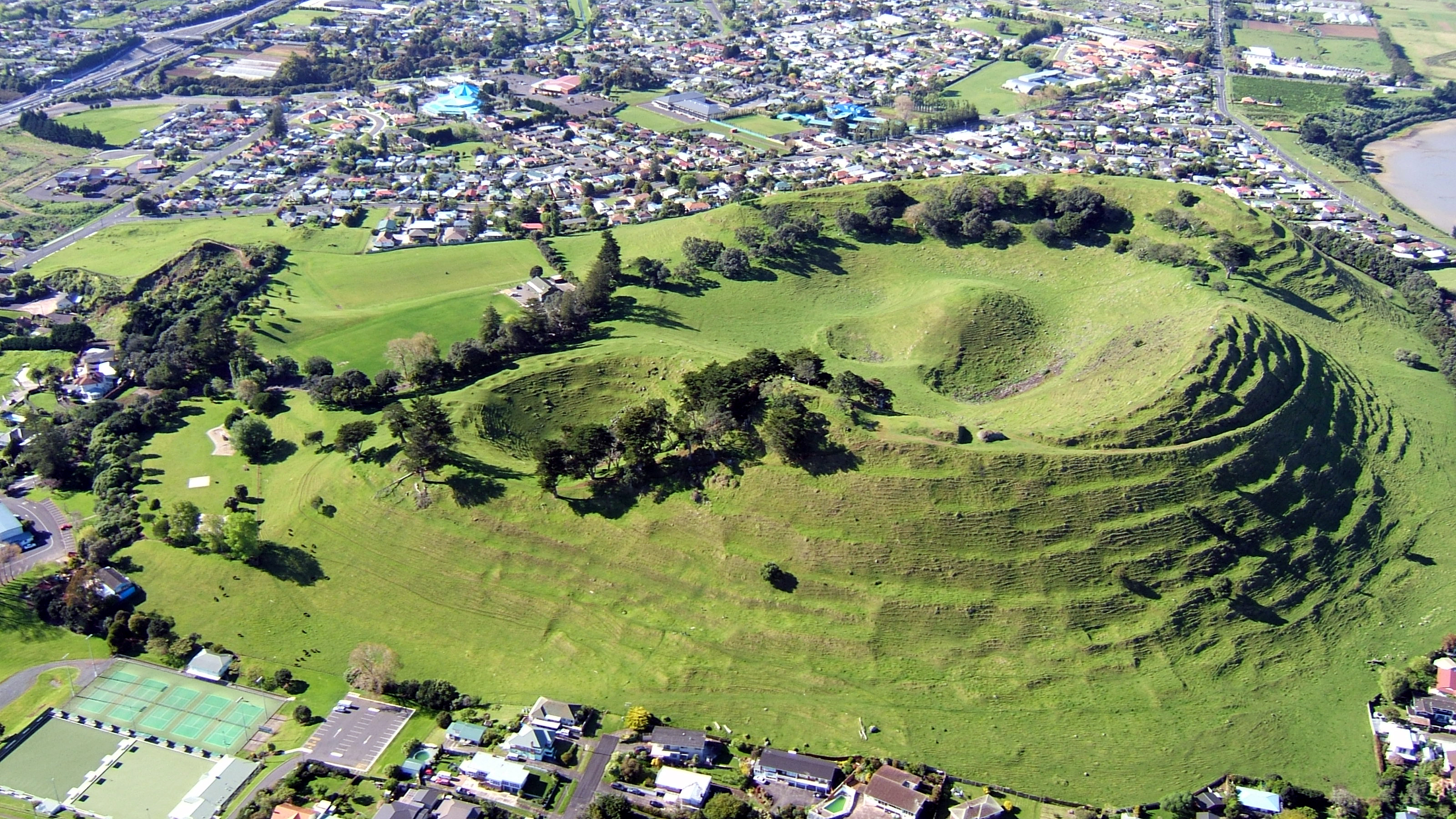
Māngere Mountain / Te Pane-o-Mataaho / Te Ara Pueru was an important pā site for Waiohua and Ngāti Whātua

The first evidence of Tāmaki Māori in the coastal Māngere area comes from the 14th century, with evidence of the first settlements later in the 15th century. Pukaki Creek formed an important part of the Waokauri / Pūkaki portage, connecting the Manukau Harbour and Tāmaki River via Papatoetoe, and was often used by Tāmaki Māori to avoid the Te Tō Waka and Karetu portages, controlled by the people who lived at Ōtāhuhu / Mount Richmond. Much of the coastal Manukau Harbour area was farmed using Polynesian stonefield agricultural techniques, such as the Ōtuataua Stonefields at Ihumātao.

In the early 18th century, Te Pane o Mataaho / Māngere Mountain was a major pā for the Waiohua, a confederacy of Tāmaki Māori iwi. The mountain complex may have been home to thousands of people, with the mountain acting as a central place for rua (food storage pits). Paramount chief Kiwi Tāmaki stayed at Māngere seasonally, when it was the time of year to hunt sharks in the Manukau Harbour. The southern slopes of Te Pane o Mataaho / Māngere Mountain were known as Taotaoroa, an extensive garden that sat between wetlands, and fed by the waters of three streams: Te Ararata (Tararata Creek), the Harania Creek and the Ōtaki Creek, a tributary of the Tāmaki River.

In the early 1740s, Kiwi Tāmaki was slain in battle by the Te Taoū hapū of Ngāti Whātua. After the battle, most Waiohua fled the region, although many of the remaining Waiohua warriors regrouped at Te Pane o Mataaho. The warriors strew pipi shells around the base of the mountain to warn against attacks, but Te Taoū warriors covered the pipi shells with dogskin cloaks to muffle the sound, and raided the pā at dawn. An alternate name for the mountain, Te Ara Pueru ("the dogskin cloak path"), references this event.

After the events of this war, Ngāti Whātua Ōrākei, a hapū created by the members of Te Taoū who remained near the Tāmaki isthmus, who intermarried with defeated members of Waiohua, settled the region. Originally the iwi were based on Maungakiekie / One Tree Hill, but after the death of paramount chief Tūperiri (circa 1795), the Māngere Bridge area and Onehunga became permanent kāinga (settlements) for Ngāti Whātua. The location was chosen because of the good quality soils for gardening, resources from the Manukau Harbour, and the area acting as a junction for surrounding trade routes. Māngere-Onehunga remained the principal residence of Ngāti Whātua Ōrākei until the 1840s, before the iwi moved to Ōrākei.

When the Waiohua people began to re-establish themselves in the Tāmaki Makaurau area in the latter 18th century, most settled around the Manukau Harbour and South Auckland. A major iwi who formed in the area from these people was Te Ākitai Waiohua. By the 19th Century, most Tāmaki Māori peoples moved away from fortified pā and favoured kāinga closer to resources and transport routes. A kāinga called Te Ararata was found near modern central Māngere along the banks of the Tararata Creek, and the central Māngere area was used as an area for growing food, medicine and plants for weaving.

In the 1820s and early 1830s, the threat of Ngāpuhi raiders from the north during the Musket Wars caused most of the Tāmaki Makaurau area to become deserted. During this period, a peace accord between Ngāpuhi and Waikato Tainui was reached through the marriage of Matire Toha, daughter of Ngāpuhi chief Rewa was married to Kati Takiwaru, the younger brother of Tainui chief Pōtatau Te Wherowhero, and they settled together on the slopes of Māngere Mountain. Ngāti Whātua returned to the Māngere-Onehunga area by the mid-1830s, re-establishing a pā on Māngere Mountain called Whakarongo.

=== Colonial period and land confiscation ===
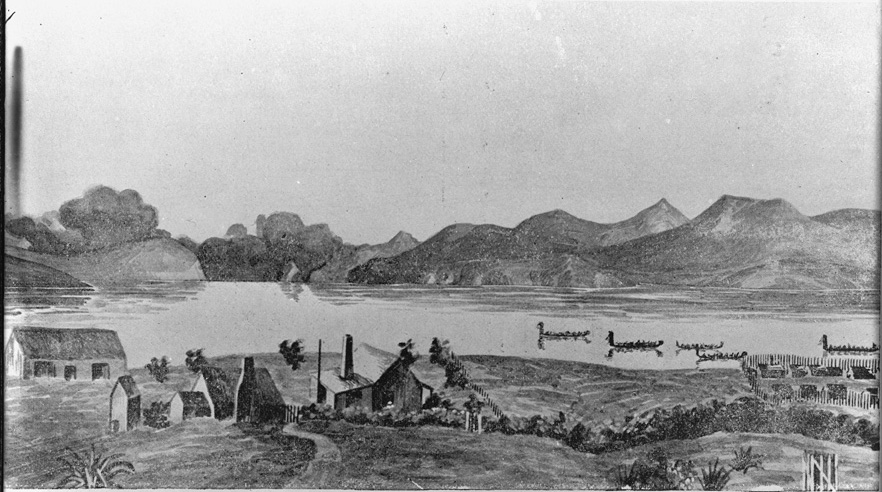
The Wesleyan Mission Station at Ihumātao, near Maungataketake (1855)

In January 1836 missionary William Thomas Fairburn brokered a land sale between Tāmaki Māori chiefs, Pōtatau Te Wherowhero and Turia of Ngāti Te Rau, covering the majority of modern-day South Auckland between Ōtāhuhu and Papakura. The sale was envisioned as a way to end hostilities in the area, but it is unclear what the chiefs understood or consented to. Māori continued to live in South Auckland, unchanged by this sale. Fairburn was criticised for the sheer size of the purchase, and in 1842 the Crown significantly reduced the size of his land holdings, and the Crown partitioned much of the land for European settlers.

On 20 March 1840, Ngāti Whātua chief Apihai Te Kawau signed the Treaty of Waitangi at Ōrua Bay on the Manukau Harbour, inviting Lieutenant-Governor William Hobson to settle in Auckland, hoping this would protect the land and people living in Auckland. In the winter of 1840, Ngāti Whātua Ōrākei moved the majority of the iwi to the Waitematā Harbour, with most iwi members resettling to the Remuera-Ōrākei area, closer to the new European settlement at Waihorotiu (modern-day Auckland CBD). A smaller Ngāti Whātua presence remained at Māngere-Onehunga, as well as members of Te Uringutu, and the western banks of the Waokauri Creek were reserved by the Crown as a native settlement in the 1850s, around the Te Ākitai Waiohua kāinga.

In the late 1840s, a Wesleyan Mission was established at Ihumātao. The area flourished as a farming area primarily for wheat and oat crops, which were processed at a mill at Ihumātao. Until the 1860s, the Māori population of the Manukau Harbour and Waikato areas produced goods to sell or barter at the port of Onehunga. During this period, the Māori population of Māngere was significantly larger than the European population.

On 9 July 1863, due to fears of the Māori King Movement, Governor Grey proclaimed that all Māori living in the South Auckland area needed to swear loyalty to the Queen and give up their weapons. Most people refused due to strong links to Tainui, leaving for the south before the Government's Invasion of the Waikato. Six men remained in the Māngere area, in order to tend to the farms and for ahi kā (land rights through continued occupation). Lieutenant-Colonel Marmaduke Nixon, who settled on the shores of Pukaki Creek in the 1850s, arrested his neighbour, the Te Ākitai Waiohua rangatira Ihaka Takanini, who later died on Rakino Island.

European settlers continued to live in the area, often looting the abandoned settlements. In 1867, the Native Compensation Court returned 144 of the original 485 acres that had been seized by the crown. The remaining land was kept by the crown as reserves, or sold on to British immigrant farmers. Te Ākitai Waiohua began returning to the area in 1866, settling to the west of Pukaki Creek and at Ihumātao.

=== Farming community ===
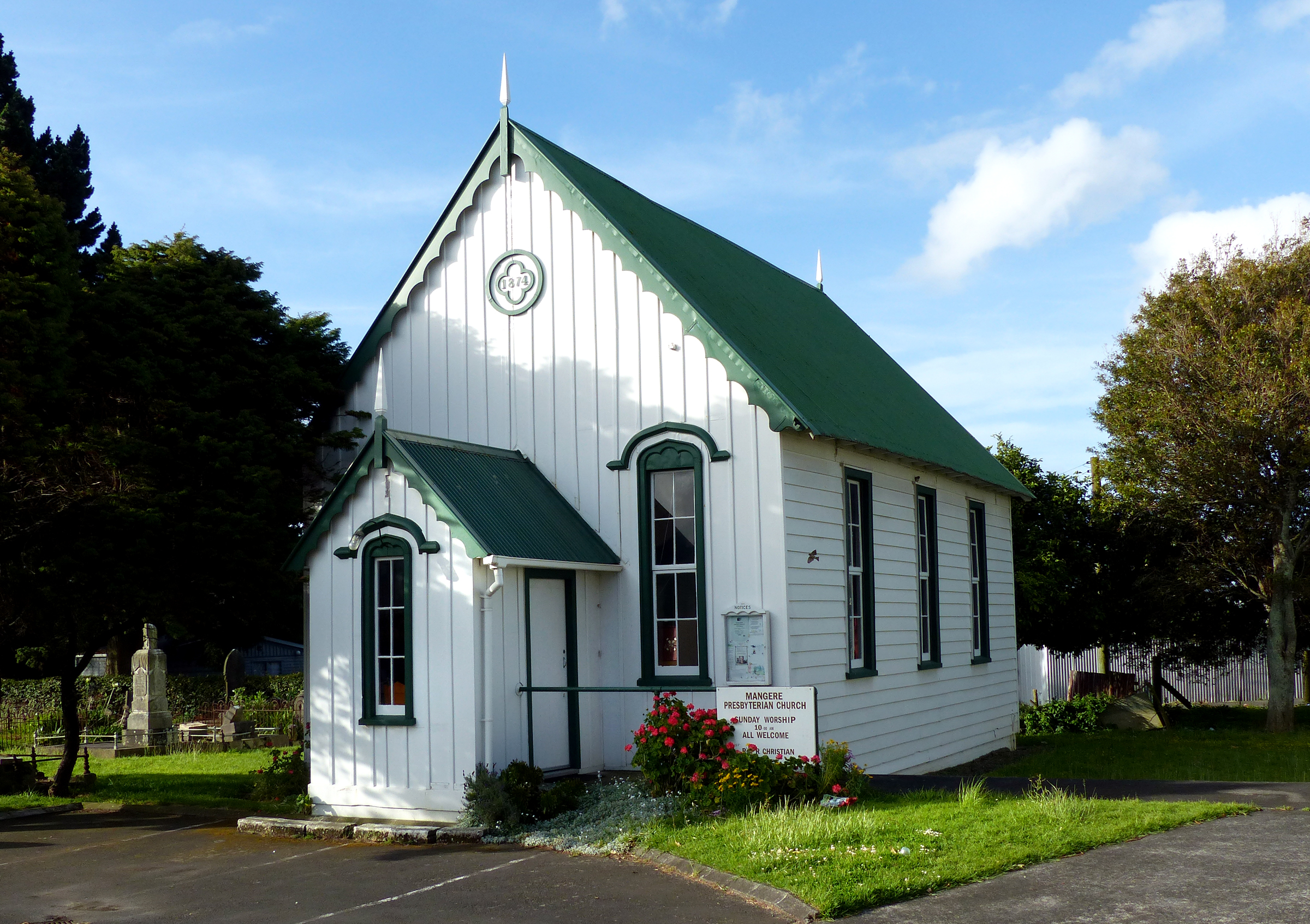
The Mangere Presbyterian Church, one of the first buildings in the area, constructed in 1874

In 1862, the first local government was established in the area, with the formation of the Mangerei Highway Board. The first school, Mangere Central School, opened in 1859, and churches were built in central Māngere in 1874 and 1894. Māngere had become known as a wheat-producing area, and by the 1880s became known for dairy farming. In October 1887, Ambury and English Ltd opened a dairy factory in the area, supplying milk from the dairy farms (which includes modern day Ambury Regional Park, and farms along Wallace Road and Creamery Road) to their stores on Karangahape Road and Ponsonby Road. The creamery closed in 1937, and in 1943 operations were sold to the New Zealand Co-operative Dairy Company. By 1915, Chinese New Zealand market garden were established around Māngere.

The Māngere area was primarily rural for the first half of the 20th century, except for the Māngere Bridge area, where the first suburban housing developed in 1875 after the construction of the first Māngere Bridge. Māngere East began to develop as a suburban area after the opening of the Otahuhu Railway Workshops in the late 1920s. The Pukaki Lagoon was drained and used as a speedway from 1928 until World War II, and by the 1950s Croatian immigrant Andrew Fistonich established the first vineyards in the area, which later grew to become Villa Maria Estates.

In the 1950s, Chinese New Zealand gardeners Fay Gock and Joe Gock began cultivating kūmara (sweet potatoes) at their farm beside Pukaki Creek, using plants donated to them by their neighbours at Pūkaki Marae. The Gocks developed a disease-resistant variety of kūmara that became the modern Owairaka Red variety.

=== State housing and suburban development ===
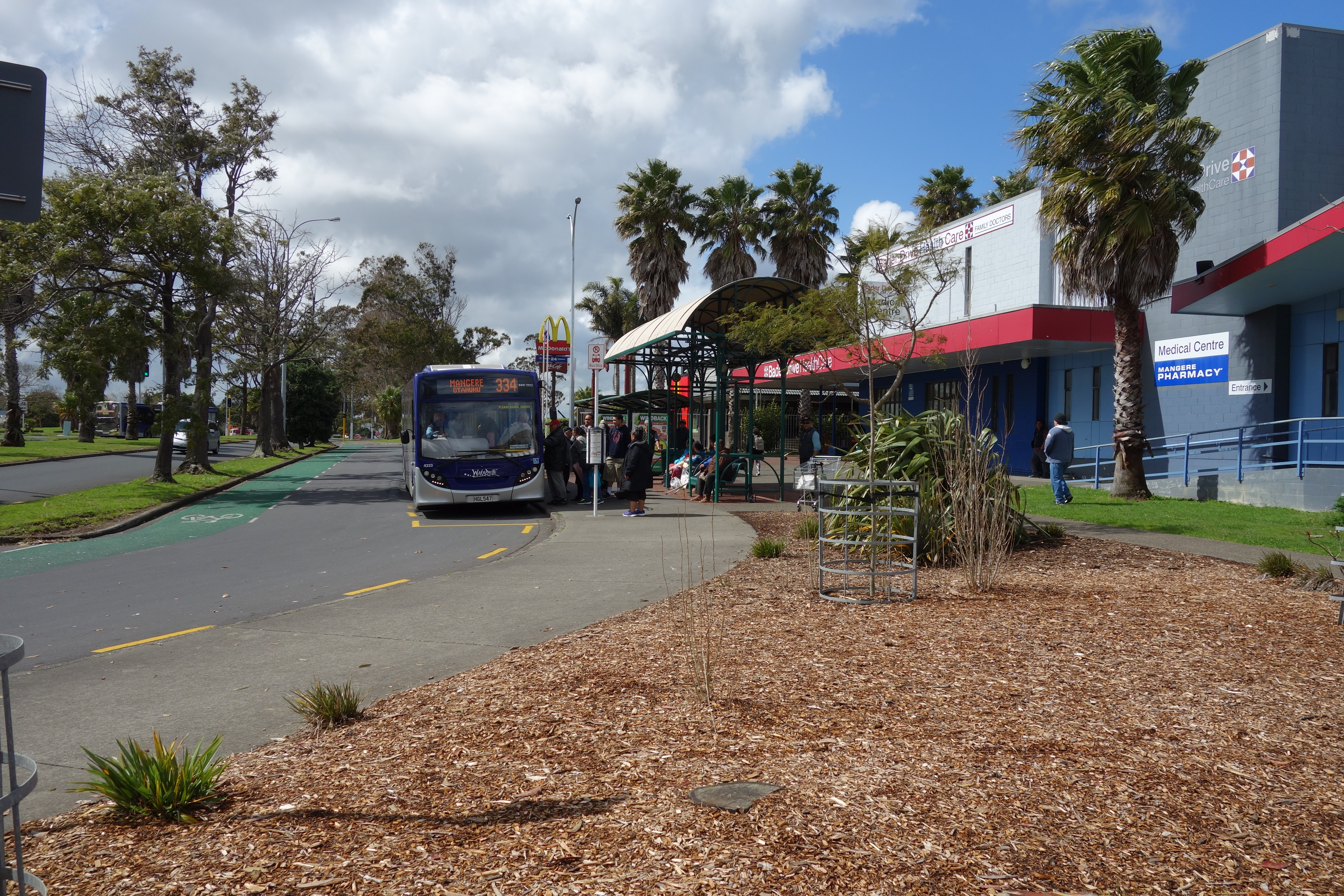
Māngere Town Centre in 2014

In 1958, the Mangere Aerodrome was chosen by the New Zealand Government as the site of a new purpose-built airport, to replace the RNZAF Base Auckland at Whenuapai served as the civilian airport for Auckland. The Auckland Airport opened in 1966. In 1962, central Māngere was chosen as a location for a large-scale state housing development. This followed Glen Innes and Ōtara as the third large-scale state housing development in Auckland aimed a low-income families, centred around a retail and community centre. By the 1980s, central Māngere had become one of the more economically deprived areas in New Zealand. By the early 2000s, Māngere had become a multicultural area of Auckland.

In 1997, State Highway 20 (commonly known as the Southwestern Motorway) extended south to Massey Road. The entire Western Ring Route project, connecting the Northwestern Motorway to the Southern Motorway was completed in 2017. In the 2010s, discussions began to create a light rail connection between the Auckland city centre to Māngere. After the 2023 New Zealand general election, plans for light rail to Māngere were placed on hold.

== Notable places ==
- Waterlea is a villa on Ambury Road that used poured concrete in its construction. Waterlea was built by J E Taylor, Chairman of Mangere Road Board and Mangere Domain Board.
- Barrow House is a modified cottage located on Church Road. Originally built in 1841 as a cottage it was later relocated and had a two-storey extension added.
- Rennie Farmhouse is a bay villa built in 1910 and located on the corner of Oruarangi and Ihumatao Road.
- Rennie-Jones Homestead is a two-storey homestead on Ihumatao Road built in 1885.
- Westney Road Methodist Church is located on the corner of George Bolt Drive and Ihumatao Road. Built in 1856 it was enlarged in 1887. Lead for the roof of a porch was stolen to create bullets.
- Massey Homestead the former residence of William Massey was built in 1852–1853 and purchased by Massey in 1890. It remained in the Massey family for more than 75 years. It later was gifted to the Manukau City Council and now serves a community centre.
- Abbeville Farm House is located on Nixon Road and was the home of Colonel Marmaduke Nixon. The house was built in 1854 and received substantial extensions throughout the years.
- Mangere Presbyterian Church is located on Kirkbride Road and was built in 1874.
- Mangere Central School House is located on Kirkbride Road. Constructed c.1880 it was part of the first school in Mangere.

== Demographics ==
Māngere covers 32.10 km^{2} (12.39 sq mi) and had an estimated population of 23,310 as of June 2025, with a population density of 726 people per km^{2}.

Historical population
| Year | Pop. | ±% p.a. |
|---|---|---|
| 2006 | 19,560 | — |
| 2013 | 19,866 | +0.22% |
| 2018 | 21,990 | +2.05% |
| 2023 | 21,357 | −0.58% |

Māngere had a population of 21,357 in the 2023 New Zealand census, a decrease of 633 people (−2.9%) since the 2018 census, and an increase of 1,491 people (7.5%) since the 2013 census. There were 10,485 males, 10,824 females and 51 people of other genders in 4,794 dwellings. 1.9% of people identified as LGBTIQ+. The median age was 29.3 years (compared with 38.1 years nationally). There were 5,202 people (24.4%) aged under 15 years, 5,703 (26.7%) aged 15 to 29, 8,610 (40.3%) aged 30 to 64, and 1,842 (8.6%) aged 65 or older.

People could identify as more than one ethnicity. The results were 11.7% European (Pākehā); 17.5% Māori; 66.1% Pasifika; 19.2% Asian; 0.7% Middle Eastern, Latin American and African New Zealanders (MELAA); and 0.8% other, which includes people giving their ethnicity as "New Zealander". English was spoken by 89.9%, Māori language by 5.0%, Samoan by 20.8%, and other languages by 26.0%. No language could be spoken by 2.9% (e.g. too young to talk). New Zealand Sign Language was known by 0.5%. The percentage of people born overseas was 39.8, compared with 28.8% nationally.

Religious affiliations were 60.0% Christian, 5.0% Hindu, 8.0% Islam, 1.9% Māori religious beliefs, 0.9% Buddhist, 0.1% New Age, and 0.7% other religions. People who answered that they had no religion were 17.1%, and 6.7% of people did not answer the census question.

Of those at least 15 years old, 1,830 (11.3%) people had a bachelor's or higher degree, 8,043 (49.8%) had a post-high school certificate or diploma, and 6,276 (38.8%) people exclusively held high school qualifications. The median income was $33,500, compared with $41,500 nationally. 639 people (4.0%) earned over $100,000 compared to 12.1% nationally. The employment status of those at least 15 was that 7,818 (48.4%) people were employed full-time, 1,314 (8.1%) were part-time, and 900 (5.6%) were unemployed.

Individual statistical areas
| Name | Area (km^{2}) | Population | Density (per km^{2}) | Dwellings | Median age | Median income |
|---|---|---|---|---|---|---|
| Auckland Airport | 23.05 | 528 | 23 | 156 | 30.7 years | $40,600 |
| Māngere North | 0.93 | 2,829 | 3,042 | 732 | 28.5 years | $35,800 |
| Māngere West | 0.73 | 3,495 | 4,788 | 708 | 27.7 years | $29,800 |
| Māngere Central | 1.45 | 3,564 | 2,458 | 813 | 28.3 years | $32,700 |
| Māngere South | 0.83 | 3,606 | 4,345 | 777 | 28.8 years | $31,500 |
| Māngere Mascot | 0.78 | 3,621 | 4,642 | 765 | 31.0 years | $30,900 |
| Māngere South East | 4.33 | 3,714 | 858 | 843 | 31.1 years | $38,200 |
| New Zealand | | | | | 38.1 years | $41,500 |

== Local government ==
The first local government in the area was the Mangerei Highway Board, which formed in 1862. It dissolved in 1919 and became administered directly by the Manukau County Council. In 1965, the area became a part of the Manukau City, In November 2010, all cities and districts of the Auckland Region were amalgamated into a single body, governed by the Auckland Council.

Māngere is a part of the Māngere-Ōtāhuhu local board area. The residents of Māngere elect members of the Māngere-Ōtāhuhu Local Board, as well as two councillors from the Manukau ward to sit on the Auckland Council.

== Sport and recreation ==
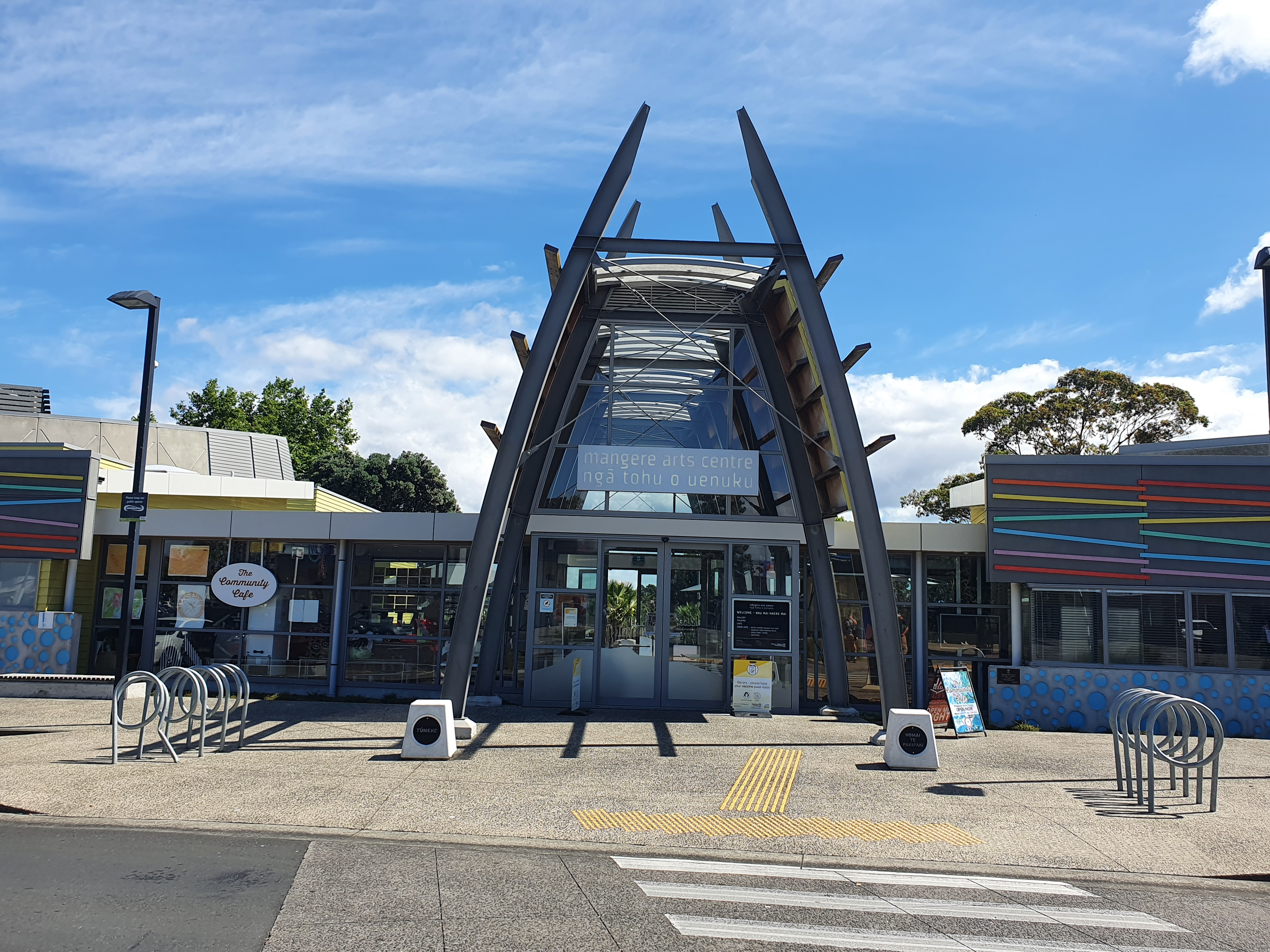
Mangere Arts Centre – Ngā Tohu o Uenuku

The Māngere Arts Centre Ngā Tohu o Uenuku is an Auckland Council owned and operated performing arts venue and gallery space.

The Mangere East Hawks rugby league club is based in Māngere at the Walter Massey Park.

The Manukau Rovers RFC rugby union club is also based in Māngere and competes in the Auckland Premier Competition.

The Mangere United football club is also based in Māngere and competes in the Auckland Football and NZ Football National League Competitions.

== Marae ==
Māngere has three marae:

- Makaurau Marae and its Tāmaki Makaurau meeting house are affiliated with the Waikato Tainui hapū of Ngāti Paretaua, Te Ākitai and Ngāti Te Ata.
- Pūkaki Marae and Te Kāhu Pokere o Tāmaki Mākaurau meeting house are affiliated with the hapū of Ngāti Pare Waiohua from Te Ākitai Waiohua, and the hapū of Te Ākitai, Ngāti Te Ata and Ngāti Paretaua from Waikato Tainui.
- Mātaatua Marae and its Awanuiarangi meeting house are affiliated with the Ngāti Awa hapū of Ngāti Awa ki Tāmaki Makaurau.

== Education ==
Māngere College is a secondary school (years 9–13) with a roll of 772 students.

Sir Douglas Bader Intermediate School is an intermediate school (years 7–8) with a roll of 288 students.

Mangere Central School and Viscount School are full primary schools (years 1–8) with rolls of 482 and 452 students, respectively.

Jean Batten School and Nga Iwi School are contributing primary schools (years 1–6) with rolls of 244 and 342 students, respectively.

Te Kura Kaupapa Māori o Māngere is a Māori-language area school (years 1–13) with a roll of 292 students.

Al-Madinah School is an area school (years 1–13) and Zayed College for Girls is a secondary school (years 7–13) with rolls of 551 and 194 students, respectively. They are state-integrated Islamic schools on adjacent sites.

All these schools except for Zayed College are coeducational. Rolls are as of July 2026.

== Notable people ==
- William Massey – 19th prime minister of New Zealand who was well known in Mangere before becoming a Member of Parliament.
- Frank Bunce – rugby union
- Jonah Lomu – rugby union
- Joseph Parker – boxer
- Jason Taumalolo – rugby league
- Grant Baker – businessman
- Sieni "Bubbah" Leo'o Olo – actress and comedian

== Bibliography ==
- Ballara, Angela (2003). "Tāmaki-makau-rau (Auckland isthmus)". Taua: 'musket wars', 'land wars' or tikanga?: warfare in Maori society in the early nineteenth century. Auckland: Penguin. ISBN 9780143018896.
- Hayward, Bruce W. (2019). Volcanoes of Auckland: a Field Guide. Auckland University Press. ISBN 978-0-582-71784-8.
- Lancaster, Mike; La Roche, John (2011). "Mangere Bridge". In La Roche, John (ed.). Evolving Auckland: The City's Engineering Heritage. Wily Publications. ISBN 9781927167038.
- Mackintosh, Lucy (2021). Shifting Grounds: Deep Histories of Tāmaki Makaurau Auckland. Bridget Williams Books. doi:10.7810/9781988587332. ISBN 978-1-988587-33-2.
- Payne, Val (2005). Celebrating Mangere Bridge. Mangere Historical Society. ISBN 0-476-00941-3.
- Stone, R. C. J. (2001). From Tamaki-makau-rau to Auckland. Auckland University Press. ISBN 1869402596.
- Wichman, Gwen (1990). Soaring Bird: A History of Manurewa to 1965. Manurewa: Manurewa Historical Society. ISBN 0-473-07114-2. Wikidata Q117421984.
