= Robertson Hill =

Coordinates: 36.948477°S 174.841726°E

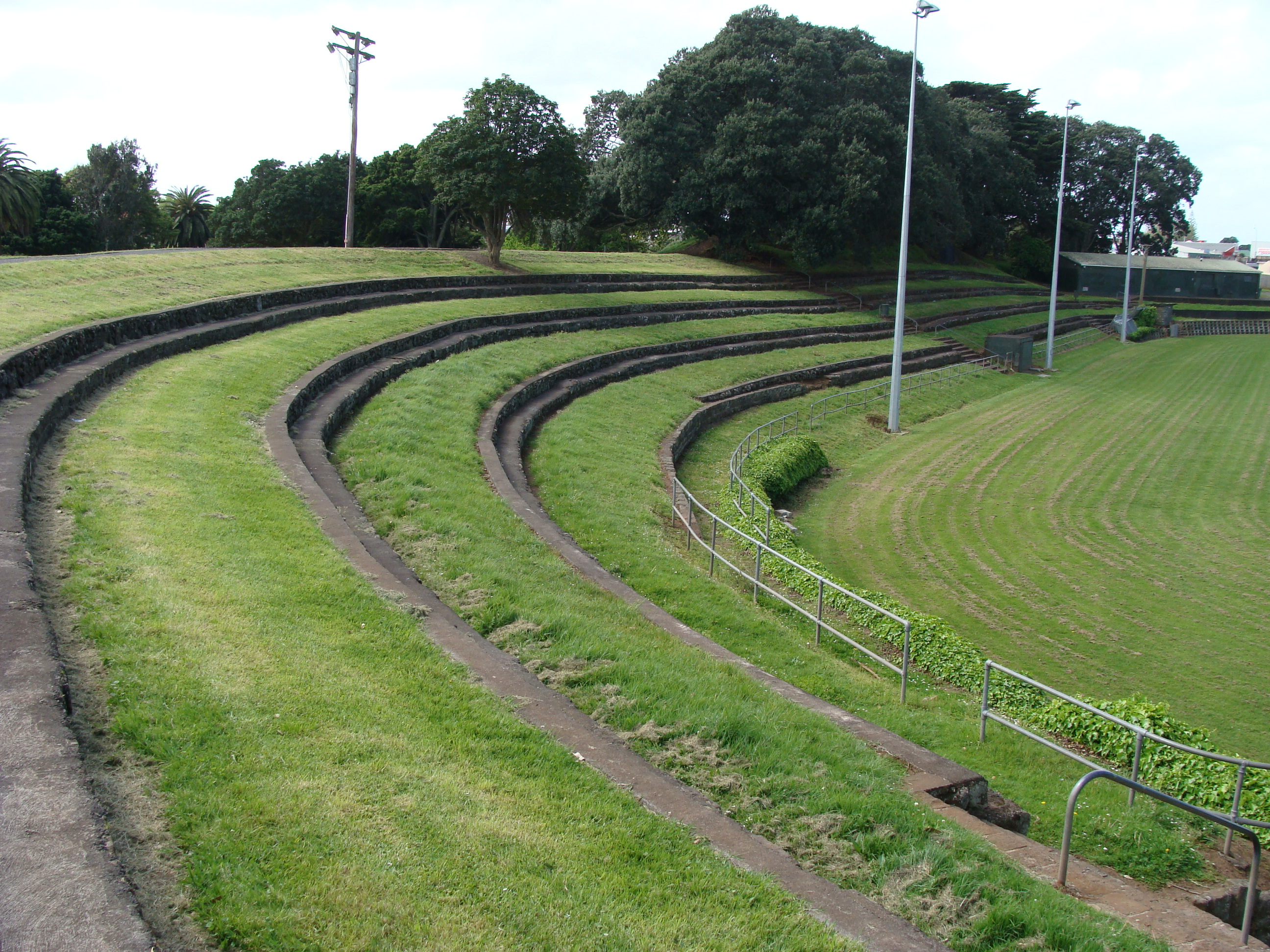
Sports field built into the crater of Robertson Hill volcano.

Robertson Hill (also Sturges Park, Mount Robertson or Te Tapuwae a Mataoho) is one of the volcanoes in the Auckland volcanic field in New Zealand. It erupted approximately 24,300 years ago. The hill, alongside Māngere Lagoon, Waitomokia, Crater Hill, Kohuora and Pukaki Lagoon, is one of the volcanic features collectively referred to as Nga Tapuwae a Mataoho ("The Sacred Footprints of Mataoho"), referring to the deity in Tāmaki Māori myths who was involved in their creation.

Its scoria cone reaches 78 metres above sea level (around 28 m above the surrounding land). The cone sits in the centre of a large explosion (maar) crater with the tuff ring arc still present around the south and east sides. In the 20th century, the scoria cone crater was reshaped into a sports oval with terraced seating, and is the home ground of Otahuhu RFC.
