= Villa Maria Estates =

New Zealand company and winery

- Location: Auckland, New Zealand
- Coordinates: 36°58′47″S 174°46′02″E
- Wine region: New Zealand
- Founded: 1961
- Key people: Sir George Fistonich KNZM
- Known for: Ngakirikiri
- Varietals: Merlot, Syrah, Pinot Noir, Malbec, Chardonnay, Sauvignon Blanc, Pinot Gris, Gewürztraminer, Riesling
- Tasting: Open to the public
- Website: www.villamariawines.com

Villa Maria Estate is one of New Zealand's wine companies. Their vineyards are located throughout New Zealand, with production bases in Gisborne, Hawke's Bay, Marlborough and Auckland.

Sir George Fistonich KNZM founded the company in 1961, upon leasing a 5-hectare (12-acre) plot of land on Kirkbride Road in Mangere, Auckland from his parents. The company relocated to a larger site on Montgomerie Road in the same suburb. In 2021 the company was bought by Indevin.

== Brands ==
Villa Maria Estate has a portfolio of several brands. These include Villa Maria, Vidal, Esk Valley, Thornbury, Riverstone, Left Field, Kidnapper Cliffs, and Te Awa.

In addition to the New Zealand domestic market, Villa Maria Estate also distributes throughout Europe, North America, the Caribbean, Asia, Australia, and the Pacific Islands.

== Wines ==
Villa Maria has six tiers of wine: Ngakirikiri, Reserve, Single Vineyard, Platinum Selection, Cellar Selection and Private Bin. Vidal covers three tiers: Legacy, Reserve and Estate. Esk Valley also covers three tiers: The Terraces, Winemaker's Reserve and Esk Valley Range. The Terraces is usually sold en primeur and is only produced during selected vintages. Te Awa produces two tiers: Te Awa and Leftfield. Thornbury, Kidnapper Cliffs and Riverstone operate on a single-tier basis.

Villa Maria produces wine styles that include Sauvignon blanc, Chardonnay, 'Bordeaux' varieties (Merlot, Cabernet Sauvignon and Malbec), Pinot noir and Riesling. Less common varietals produced are Gewürztraminer, Pinot gris, Viognier, Verdelho, Syrah, Grenache, Chenin blanc, Albariño and Arneis.

== Wineries ==
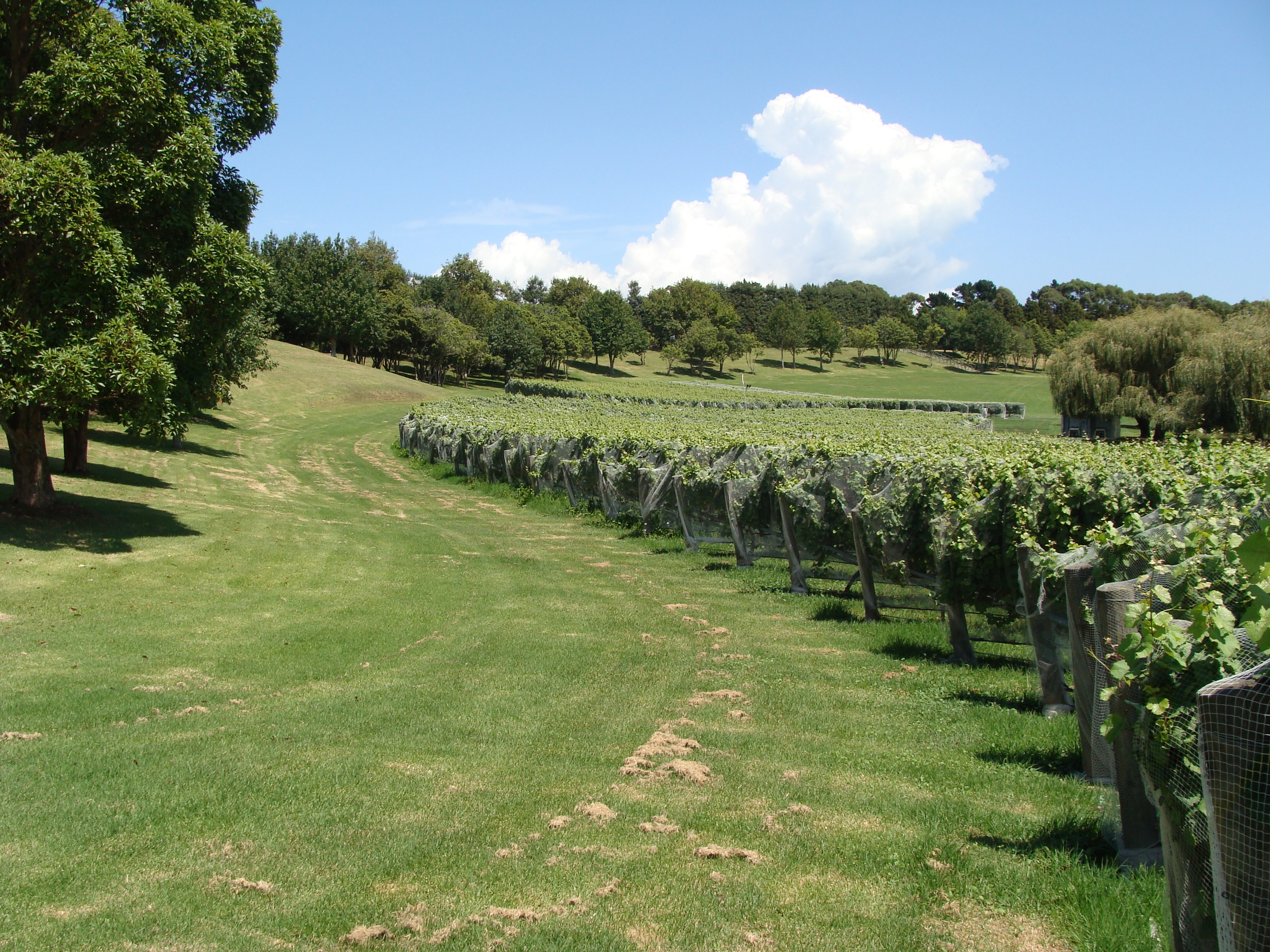
Villa Maria vineyard at Waitomokia, Auckland

The Auckland vineyard was originally located at Kirkbride Road in Māngere Bridge. In 2000, George Fistonich purchased Waitomokia / Mount Gabriel, a nearby quarried volcanic site in Māngere. The vineyard and packaging facilities opened on the site in 2005.

== Awards ==
Villa Maria Estate was named the supreme winner at the New Zealand Sustainable Business Network Awards in November 2012.
