= Grant Baker (businessman) =

New Zealand businessman and entrepreneur

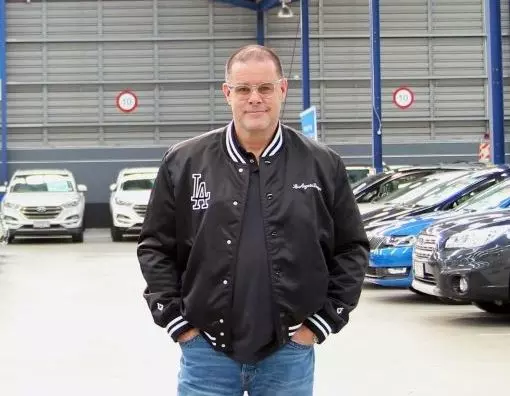
- Grant Baker
- Born: 1957 (age 68–69)
- Occupations: Businessman, entrepreneur
- Known for: Co-founding The Business Bakery, 42 Below, Turners Automotive Group, and involvement with Trilogy International

Grant Baker is a New Zealand businessman, entrepreneur, and venture capitalist.

== Early life and education ==
Grant Baker was raised in Māngere, located in the south of Auckland, New Zealand, with interests in motorsports from a young age. He attended teachers' college with the intention of earning an education degree but left early to pursue a career in sales.

== Career ==
Baker's career began with newspaper ad sales before moving to office equipment sales. He is best known for co-founding the successful venture capital firm The Business Bakery. He gained attention for his role in the creation and $132 million sale of 42 Below vodka to Bacardi in 2006. As a chairman and principal of Auckland-based Business Bakery, Baker played a role in the $211 million takeover of Trilogy International by CITIC Capital.

Following the sale of Trilogy, Baker, along with his business partners, turned their attention to Me Today, an NZX-listed health and skincare company.

During the 2008 financial crisis, Baker's venture capital firm invested in Dorchester Pacific. This investment was pivotal as Dorchester evolved into Turners Automotive Group, which emerged as a notable entity in the NZ50 index. Baker's role transitioned to that of a non-executive chairman and a substantial shareholder in Turners Automotive Group.

== Philanthropy ==
After having had bowel cancer, Baker co-founded the Gut Cancer Foundation, which aims to support research and increase awareness of gut cancers in New Zealand.

== Personal life ==
Baker is a car collector, known for his collection of Ferraris. He has been involved in motorsport racing in Ferrari's Challenge Series as well as the support of young racing drivers, including Formula 1’s Liam Lawson.

In 2026, Baker published his memoir No Pit Stops: The Business of Going All In.
