= Cemetery Crater =

Volcanic crater in Auckland, New Zealand

Coordinates: 36.989828°S 174.841082°E

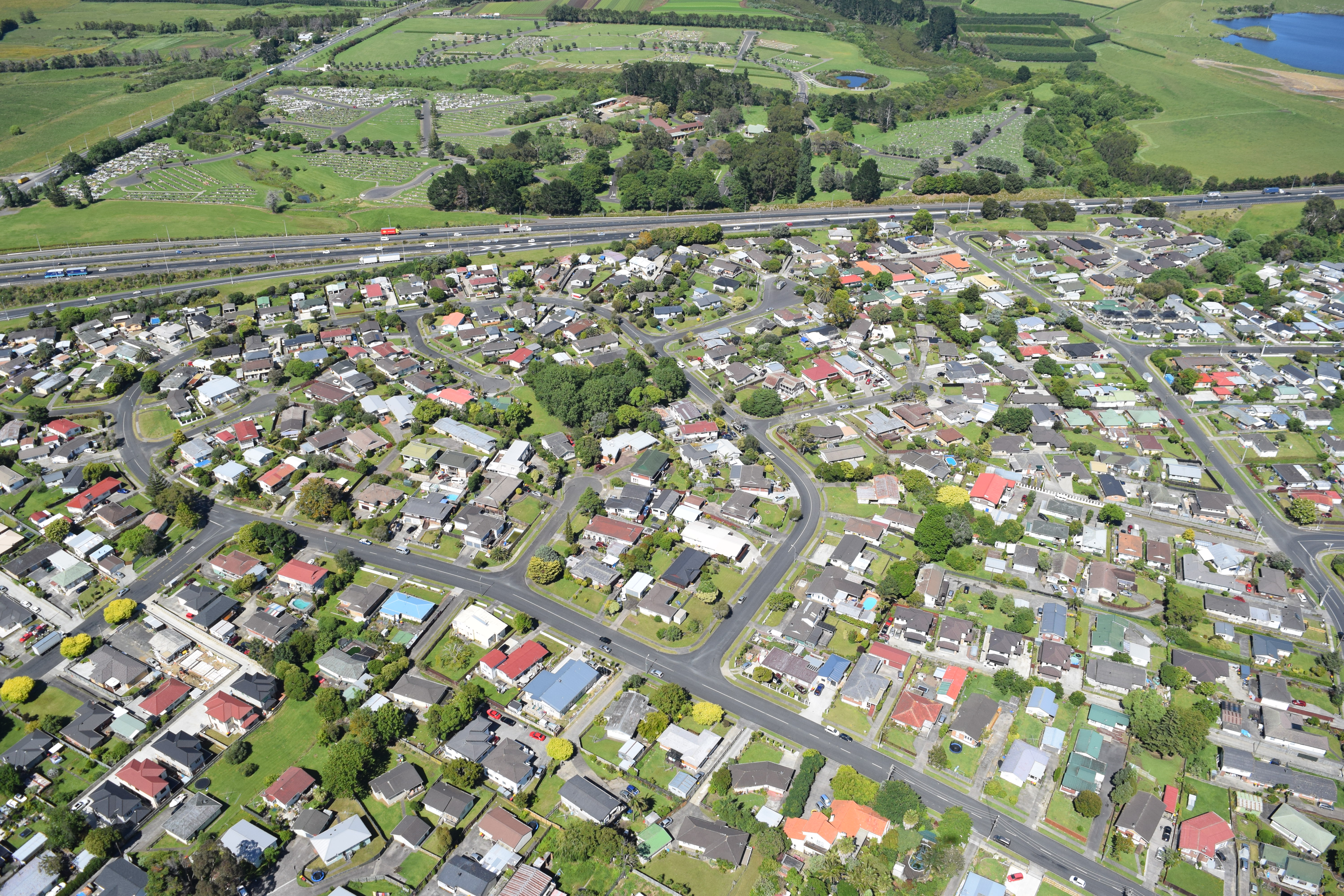
The site of Cemetery Crater in 2018, which has since been developed as suburban housing

Cemetery Crater is one of the volcanoes in the Auckland volcanic field. It is an explosion crater roughly 200 metres (660 ft) wide, located east of Crater Hill. Hard to see even in early aerial photos due to its shallowness, it is now covered by housing.

== History ==
Cemetery Crater was the location of a fortified pā site used by Tāmaki Māori. The pā is known by the name Te Pā-o-te-tū-tahi-atu, or Pā o Tahi, a name that describes the pā as a place only used temporarily, due to the unsuitable flat land of the area.

Cemetery Crater was first recognised as a volcano by Ernie Searle in the 1960s. He named it because of its proximity to the cemetery in Puhinui Rd, but the Southwestern Motorway has now been constructed between the crater and the cemetery.

The crater is primarily covered by housing and a small local park, Pā o Tahi / Hillside South Park.
