= Pūkaki Lagoon =

Coordinates: 36.982998°S 174.810226°E

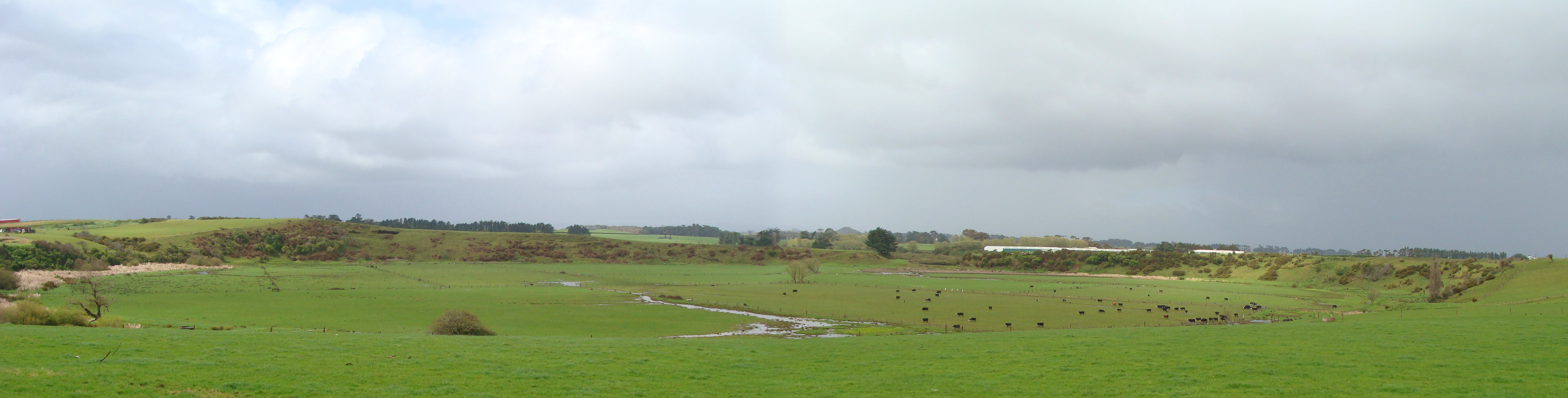

- Location within New Zealand
- Location: Māngere, New Zealand
- Type: Volcanic lagoon
- Primary inflows: Freshwater (originally)
- Primary outflows: Tidal (originally)
- Basin countries: New Zealand
- Max. width: 600 m (2,000 ft)

Pūkaki Lagoon (Te Pūkaki Tapu a Poutūkeka - The Sacred Spring of Poutūkeka), located in the suburb of Māngere, New Zealand, is one of the volcanoes in the Auckland volcanic field. The lagoon, alongside Māngere Lagoon, Waitomokia, Crater Hill, Kohuora and Robertson Hill, is one of the volcanic features collectively referred to as Nga Tapuwae a Mataoho ("The Sacred Footprints of Mataoho"), referring to the deity in Tāmaki Māori myths who was involved in their creation. The crater and surrounding lands are co-managed by Auckland Council and Te Ākitai Waiohua as open space for public enjoyment.

== Geology ==
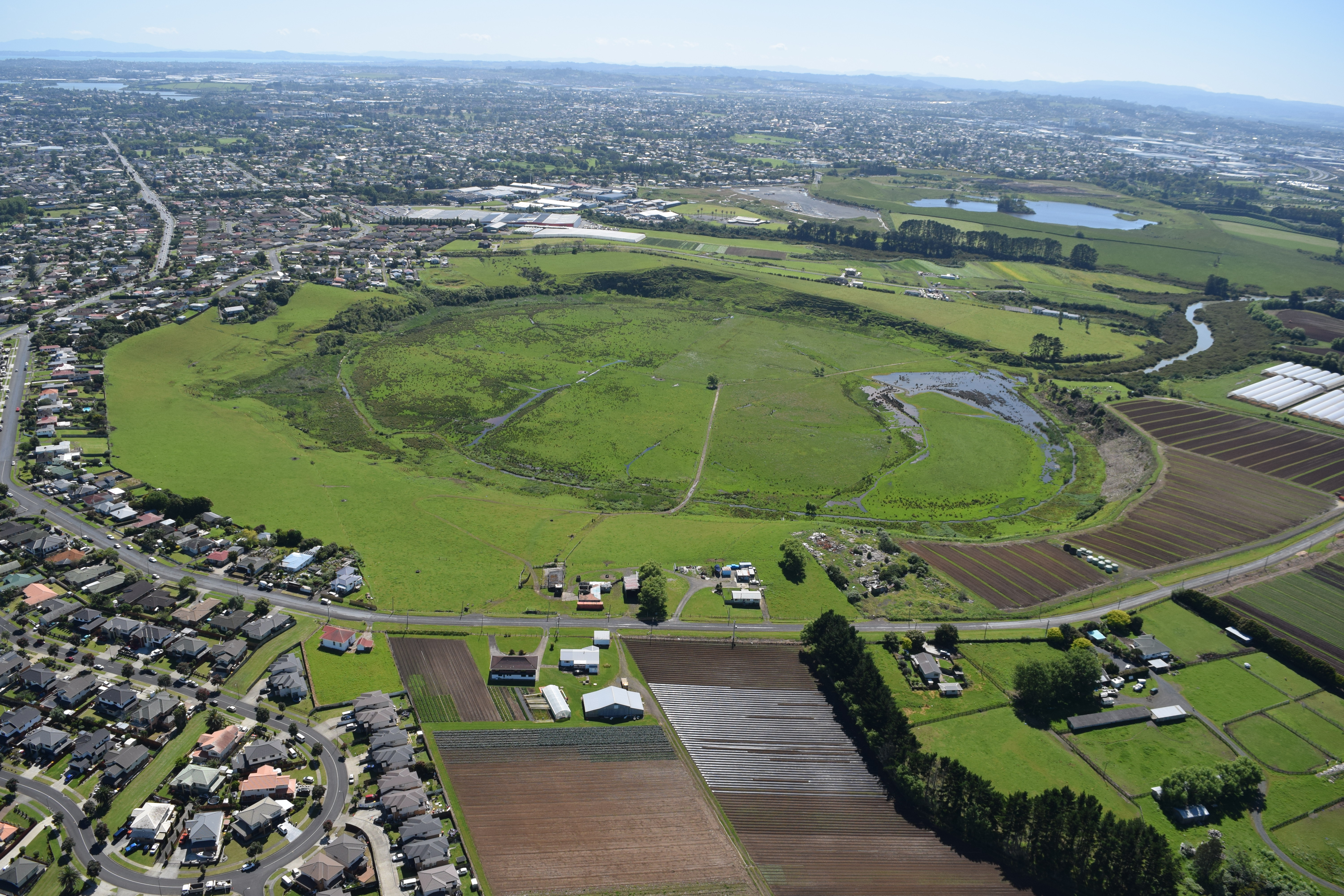
Pukaki explosion crater and tuff ring, 2018

Pūkaki Lagoon is a maar with 600 m wide explosion crater and surrounding tuff ring. After an eruption about 65,000 yrs ago the crater filled with freshwater and became a lake. As sea-levels rose after the end of the last ice age (about 8,000 years ago) Pūkaki Creek connected it to the sea and it became a tidal lagoon. The lagoon has since been drained by human activity and only a small lake remains inside the crater.

== History ==
Māori occupation of the crater and surrounding lands can be traced back to the arrival of Tainui waka when Poutūkeka, son of Hoturoa first landed on the shores of the Manukau Harbour. Poutūkeka later settled in the Manukau area where Pūkaki Marae stands today. The estuary and creek provided the people with resources, and the lagoon was used to shelter waka.

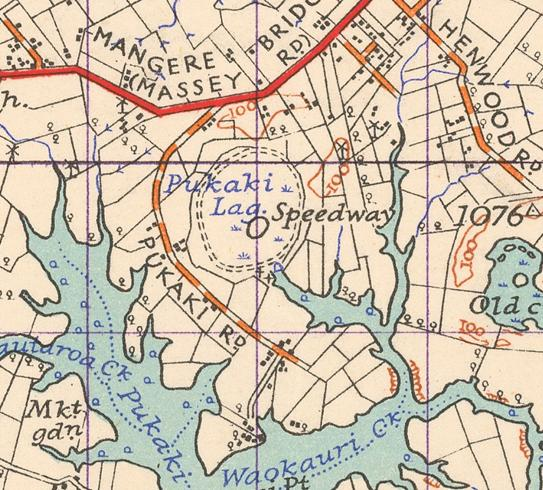
Excerpt from 1946 topographical map showing Pukaki Lagoon and Henning's Speedway. The speedway track is marked with a dashed line.

After the New Zealand Wars, Pūkaki Creek was dammed and the lagoon drained to create farmland. Later it was bought by Motor-racing entrepreneur George Henning and used as a speedway. Henning's Speedway hosted races from 1923 to 1934, when speedway racing moved to Onehunga and the lagoon returned to farmland.

In 2007 it was bought by the Manukau City Council for a public reserve, and since 2010 has been co-managed by the local council (now Auckland Council and Te Ākitai Waiohua - the Pūkaki Māori Marae Committee.
