= Waitomokia =

Volcano in New Zealand

Coordinates: 36.976981°S 174.770336°E

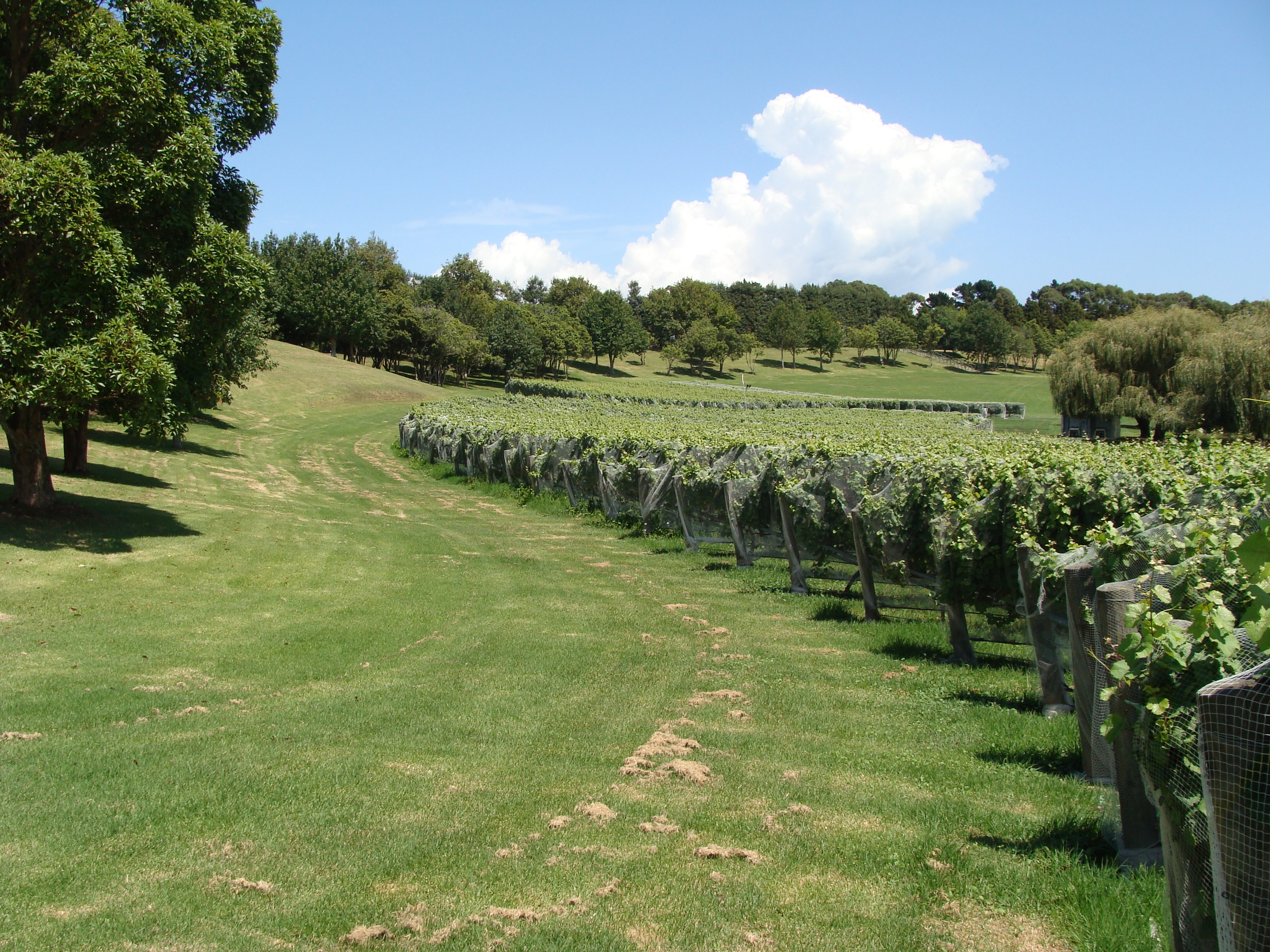
Vineyards within Waitomokia's explosion crater

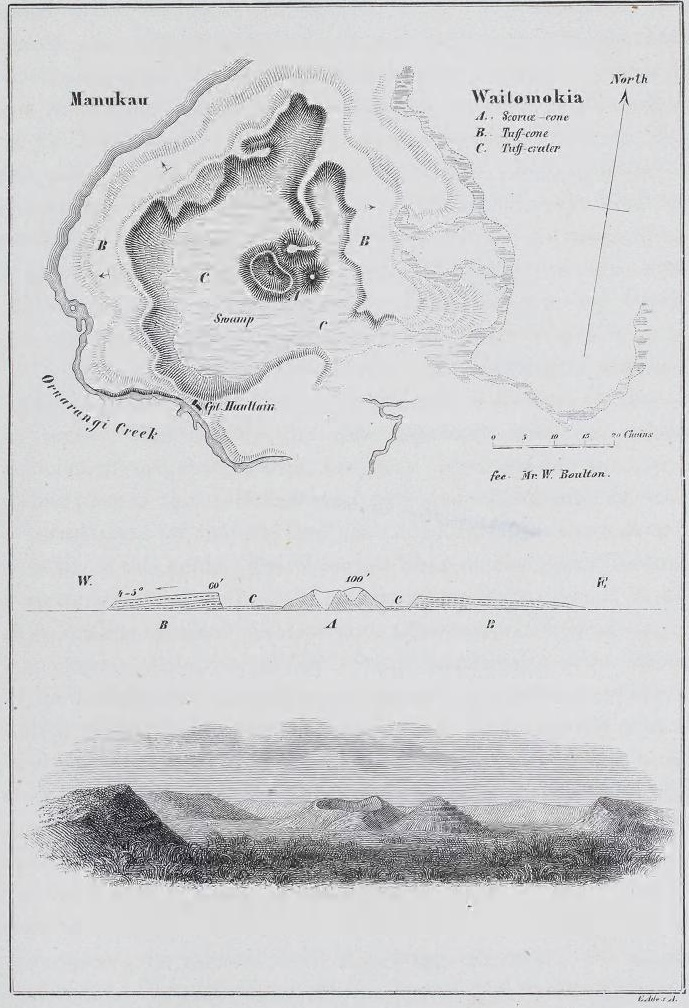
Diagram of Waitomokia circa 1860

Waitomokia (also Moerangi, Gabriel Hill or Mount Gabriel) is a volcano in the Auckland volcanic field. Waitomokia's 600 m (2,000 ft) wide tuff crater contained three small scoria cones up to 20 m (66 ft) high, one with a crater, which were quarried in the 1950s.

== Geology ==
The volcano erupted an estimated 20,300 years ago, based on volcanic ash samples found at Pūkaki Lagoon. The volcano consisted of an elliptical explosion crater, with three small cones surrounded by a 15-25 metre tuff ring. The cones, each approximately 30 metres in height, were produced by explosive eruptions from three vents in the centre of the crater. The two eastern cones were conical, while the south-western peak was a spatter cone with an 18-metre deep crater. After the initial eruptions, the crater formed a freshwater swamp.

== Human history ==
The crater lake and swamp were given the name Waitomokia ("Water Seeping into the Ground") by Tāmaki Māori, while three cones were called Moerangi. The volcano, alongside Māngere Lagoon, Crater Hill, Kohuora, Pukaki Lagoon and Robertson Hill, is one of the volcanic features collectively referred to as Nga Tapuwae a Mataoho ("The Sacred Footprints of Mataoho"), referring to the deity who was involved in their creation. The two conical cones were the location of a pā (hillfort), and the sides were terraced with kūmara rua (sweet potato storage pits).

When European settlers arrived in the Māngere area, they named the volcano Mount Gabriel, after an early settler. The scoria cones were quarried in the 1950s in order to construct the Manukau Sewage Purification Works (now Māngere Wastewater Treatment Plant) adjacent to the volcano. In the latter half of the 20th century, the land was used for kiwifruit packhouses, floriculture and horticulture. In 2005, the land became the location of Villa Maria Estates, a vineyard that had previously been headquartered to the north-east along Kirkbride Road. The crater is occasionally used for public concerts in the summer, and has been a venue for concerts by Bic Runga, Tim Finn, the Topp Twins, Jack Johnson and the National.
