= Mataaho =

Māori deity

- Guardian of the earth's secrets God of earthquakes and eruptions God of volcanic forces
- Other names: Mataaho, Mataoho, Mataaoho
- Gender: Male
- Region: New Zealand
- Ethnic group: Māori

Genealogy
- Siblings: Rūaumoko

Mataaho (also known as Mataaoho and Mataoho) is a Māori deity. Variously considered a god of earthquakes and eruptions, the guardian of the earth's secrets, the god of volcanic forces, or a giant, Mataaho is associated with many of the volcanic features in the Tāmaki Makaurau Region (Auckland Region). In traditional Tāmaki Māori myths, Mataaho either creates the volcanic features of the landscape, or requests the gods to create them. Mataaho holds traditional significance for Te Kawerau ā Maki and Waiohua iwi, and is considered a tupuna (ancestor) of Te Ākitai Waiohua and Ngaati Te Ata Waiohua iwi.

== Myths ==
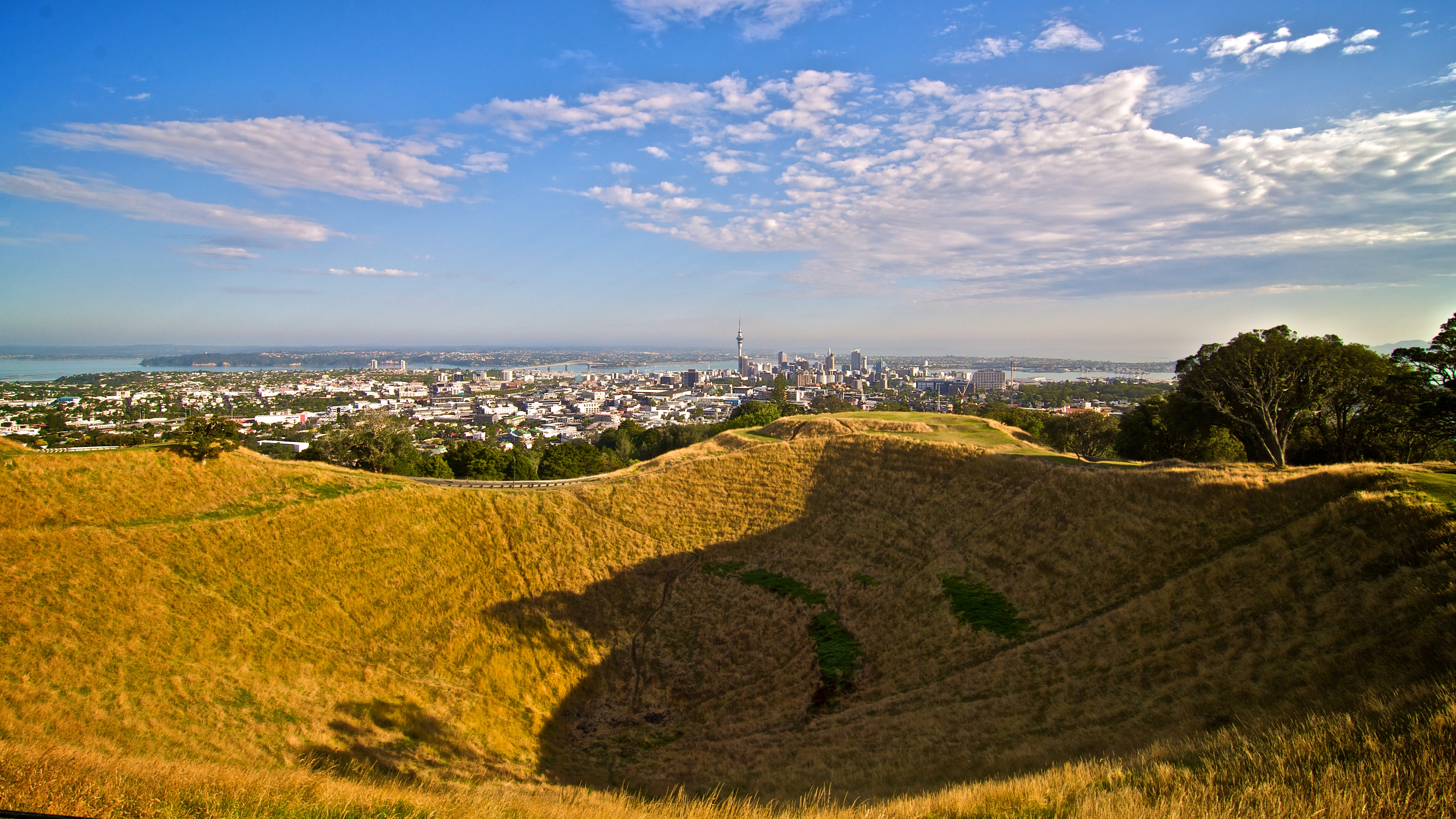
Te Kapua Kai a Mataaho ("The Food Bowl of Mataaho"), where ceremonies were held by Tāmaki Māori to placate Mataaho

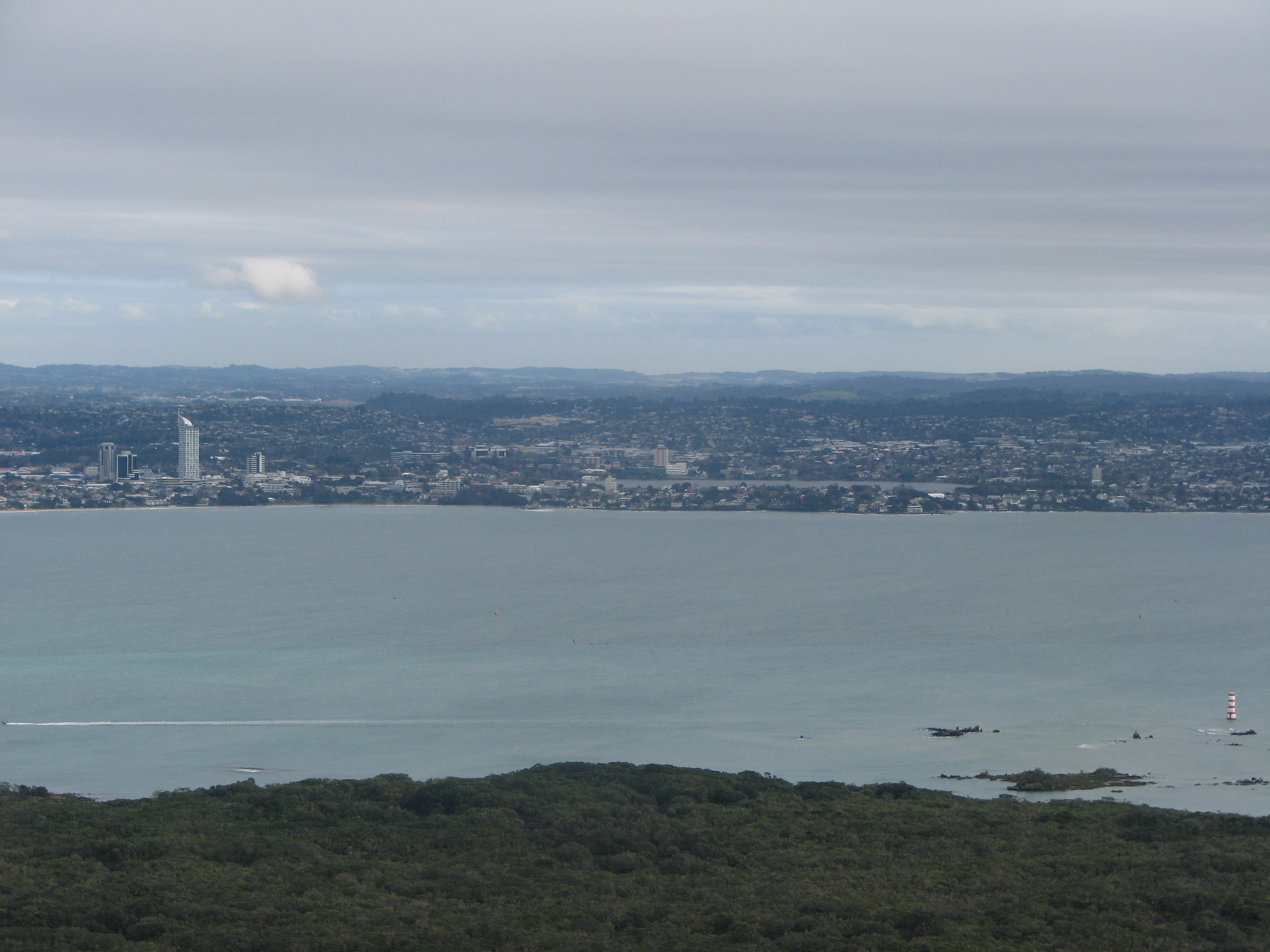
The view Mataaho created from Rangitoto Island, for the tupua Ohomatakamokamo and Matakerepo, so that they can view their ruined former home (Lake Pupuke)

Myths of Mataaho are closely associated with many of the features of the Auckland volcanic field. The features were the creation of Mataaho and his brother Rūaumoko (the god of earthquakes and volcanoes), made as punishment against a tribe of patupaiarehe, supernatural beings living in the Waitākere Ranges, who used deadly magic from the earth to defeat a war party of patupaiarehe from the Hunua Ranges. Ceremonies were held by Tāmaki Māori in the crater of Maungawhau / Mount Eden, in order to placate Mataaho and stop him from releasing volcanic forces. The crater is known as Te Ipu a Mataaho or Te Kapua Kai o Mataaho ("The Food Bowl of Mataoho"). In one tradition, the crater was where Mataaho lived with his wife. After his wife left him and took all of his clothes, the fire goddess Mahuika sent fire down to the earth to warm Mataaho, which formed Ngā Huinga-a-Mataaho ("the gathered volcanoes of Mataaho").

Mataaho is associated with some of the myths surround the creation of Rangitoto. In the Ngāi Tai story of Te Riri a Mataaho (The Wrath of Mataaho), two tupua (children of the Fire God), Ohomatakamokamo and his wife Matakerepo, lived on Te Rua Maunga, a mountain located at Lake Pupuke. The couple argued over some flax clothing that Matakerepo had made for her husband, an argument that became so heated that the fire outside their dwelling died out. Ohomatakamokamo cursed Mahuika, Goddess of the Fire, for allowing this to happen. Mahuika was furious at the couple, and asked Mataaho to punish them. Mataaho destroyed their mountain home, and in its place left Pupuke Moana (Lake Pupuke), while at the same time he formed the mountain Rangitoto. The couple fled to the newly formed island, where Mataaho formed three peaks on the mountain, so that the couple can view the ruins of their former home. It is said that when mists surround Rangitoto, it is the tears of these tupua crying for their former home. In some versions of the story, the couple return to the mainland, and are punished further by Mataaho, turning them to stone and forming the craters Onepoto and Te Kopua o Matakamokamo (Tank Farm) where they stood.

Mataaho is also involved in the stories of Rangi and Papa (however Mataaho may be one of the names for the atua Io Matua Kore (Io-mataaho)). After Ranginui (the god of the sky) and Papatūānuku (the goddess of the Earth) were separated, causing them grief and their children to war. Due to the leadership of Mataaho during this war, it was decided that Papatūānuku should be turned over to face Rarohenga (the underworld), so that she would no longer feel grief at seeing her husband, a series of events that can be called Te Hurihanga a Mataaho ("The Turning Over of Mataaho").

== List of locations named after Mataaho ==
The Auckland volcanic field can be collectively referred to as Ngā Maunga a Mataaho ("The Mountains of Mataaho"), or Ngā Huinga-a-Mataaho ("the gathered volcanoes of Mataaho"). Among these, several features also reference Mataaho:

- Ngā Tapuwae a Mataoho ("The Sacred Footprints of Mataoho") - Pukaki Creek in Māngere, also a general term for the smaller volcanoes around the Mangere area: Māngere Lagoon, Waitomokia, Crater Hill, Kohuora, Pukaki Lagoon and Robertson Hill. The name of the Māngere East Kura Kaupapa Māori (language immersion school) Te Kura Māori o Ngā Tapuwae is a reference to Ngā Tapuwae a Mataoho.
- Te Ihu a Mataoho ("The Nose of Mataoho") - now shortened to Ihumātao, or used in full as a reference to the beach to the south of Ihumātao.
- Te Ipu a Mataoho, or Te Kapua Kai o Mataoho ("The Food Bowl of Mataoho") - the crater of Maungawhau / Mount Eden
- Te Pane o Mataaho, or Te Upoko o Mataaho ("The Head of Mataoho") - Māngere Mountain
- Te Tapuwae a Mataoho ("The Footprint of Mataoho") - Robertson Hill
- Te Tātua a Mataoho ("The War Belt of Mataoho") - an older name for Te Tatua-a-Riukiuta / Three Kings
