= Māngere Lagoon =

Lagoon in New Zealand

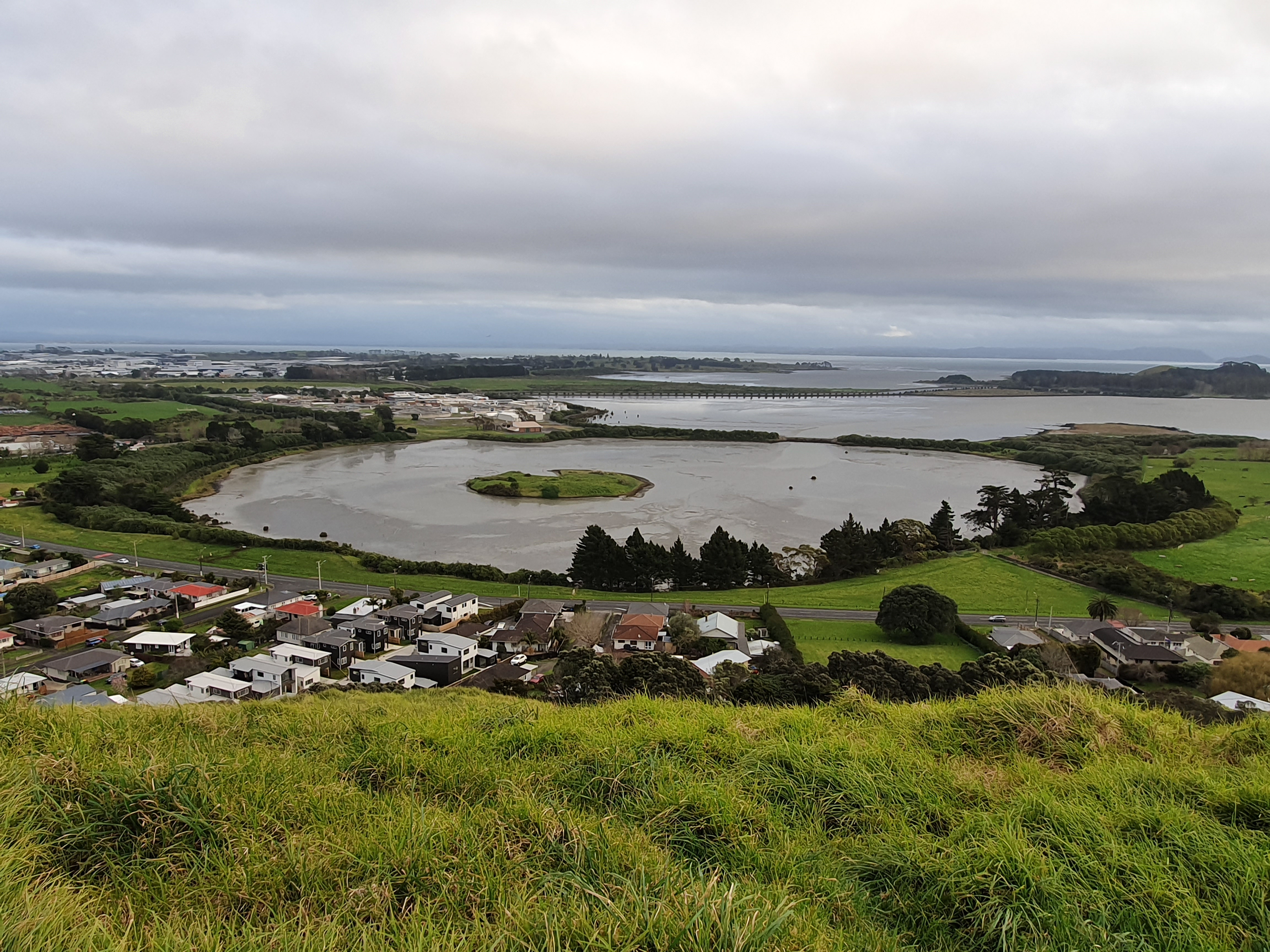
- Māngere Lagoon seen from Māngere Mountain
- Interactive map of Māngere Lagoon
- Location: Auckland, North Island
- Coordinates: 36.95702°S 174.77763°E
- Type: maar lake
- Primary outflows: Manukau Harbour
- Surface elevation: 0 m (0 ft)

Māngere Lagoon is a lagoon in the Manukau Harbour, New Zealand. It occupies a volcanic crater or maar which is part of the Auckland volcanic field. Oval and about 600m long, it has a small restored scoria island remaining in the centre.

== Geography ==
Māngere Lagoon erupted an estimated 59,500 years before the present, predating the adjacent Māngere Mountain. Approximately 7,000 years ago, the crater became a tidal lagoon due to rising sea levels. The crater dome became a small island within the tidal estuary.

== History ==
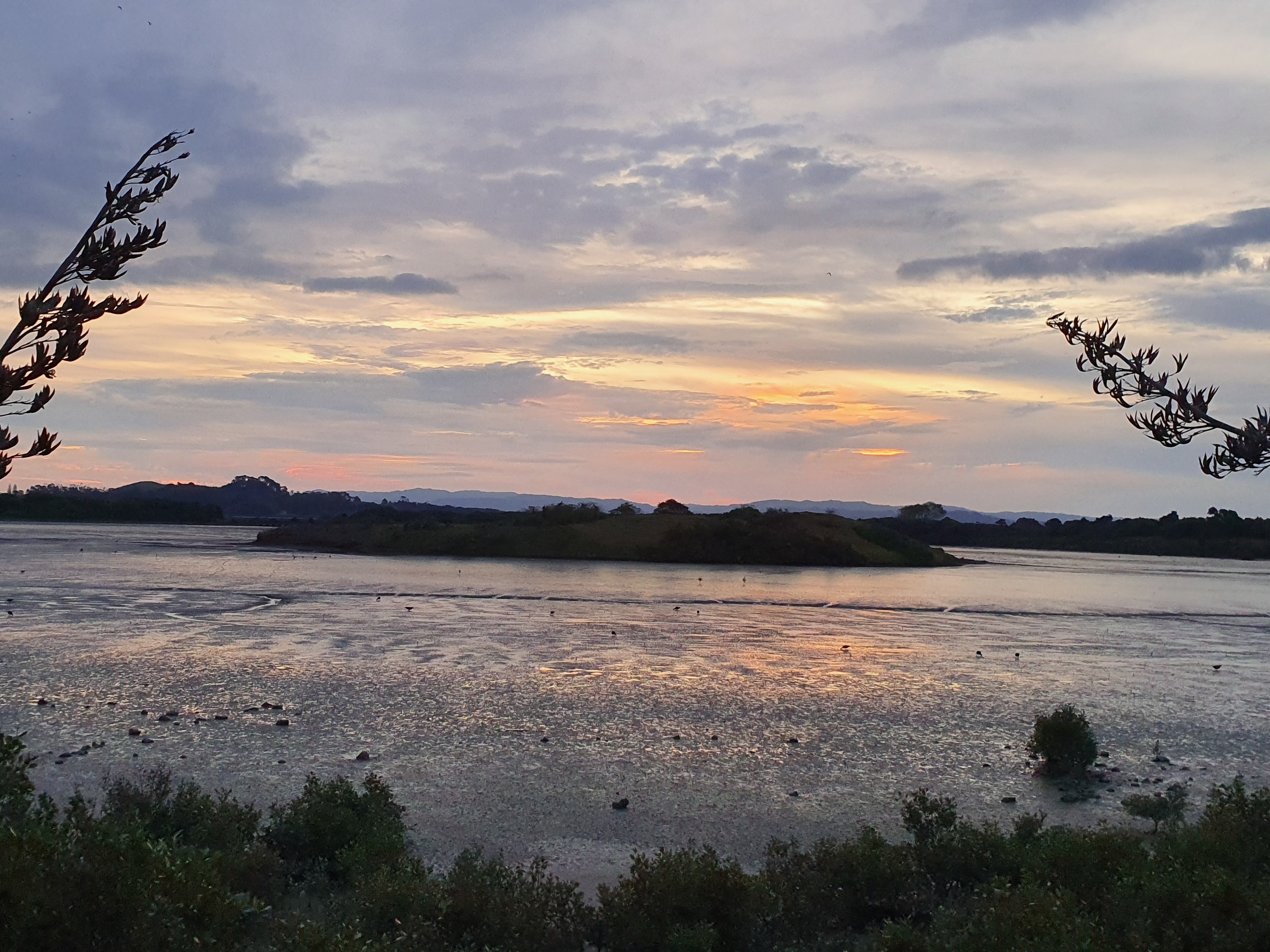
Māngere Lagoon at low tide, seen from the Māngere Lagoon Path

The lagoon, alongside Waitomokia, Crater Hill, Kohuora, Pukaki Lagoon and Robertson Hill, is one of the volcanic features collectively referred to as Nga Tapuwae a Mataoho ("The Sacred Footprints of Mataoho"), referring to the deity in Tāmaki Māori myths who was involved in their creation.

In the 1930s efforts were made to drain the swamp for conversion to pasture, while in the late 1950s, earthworks for sewage sludge ponds in the lagoon removed the scoria cone and the crater was divided into ponds. Public demand for a better sewage treatment system eventually led to a land-based facility, and in 2003, the restoration of the area to a tidal lagoon was completed, with the sludge removed. The scoria cone was rebuilt with an extra flat portion added on the west side as an artificial bird roost. The shores of the lagoon are restored with native bush, replacing pine forests.
