= Kohuora =

Volcano in Auckland, New Zealand

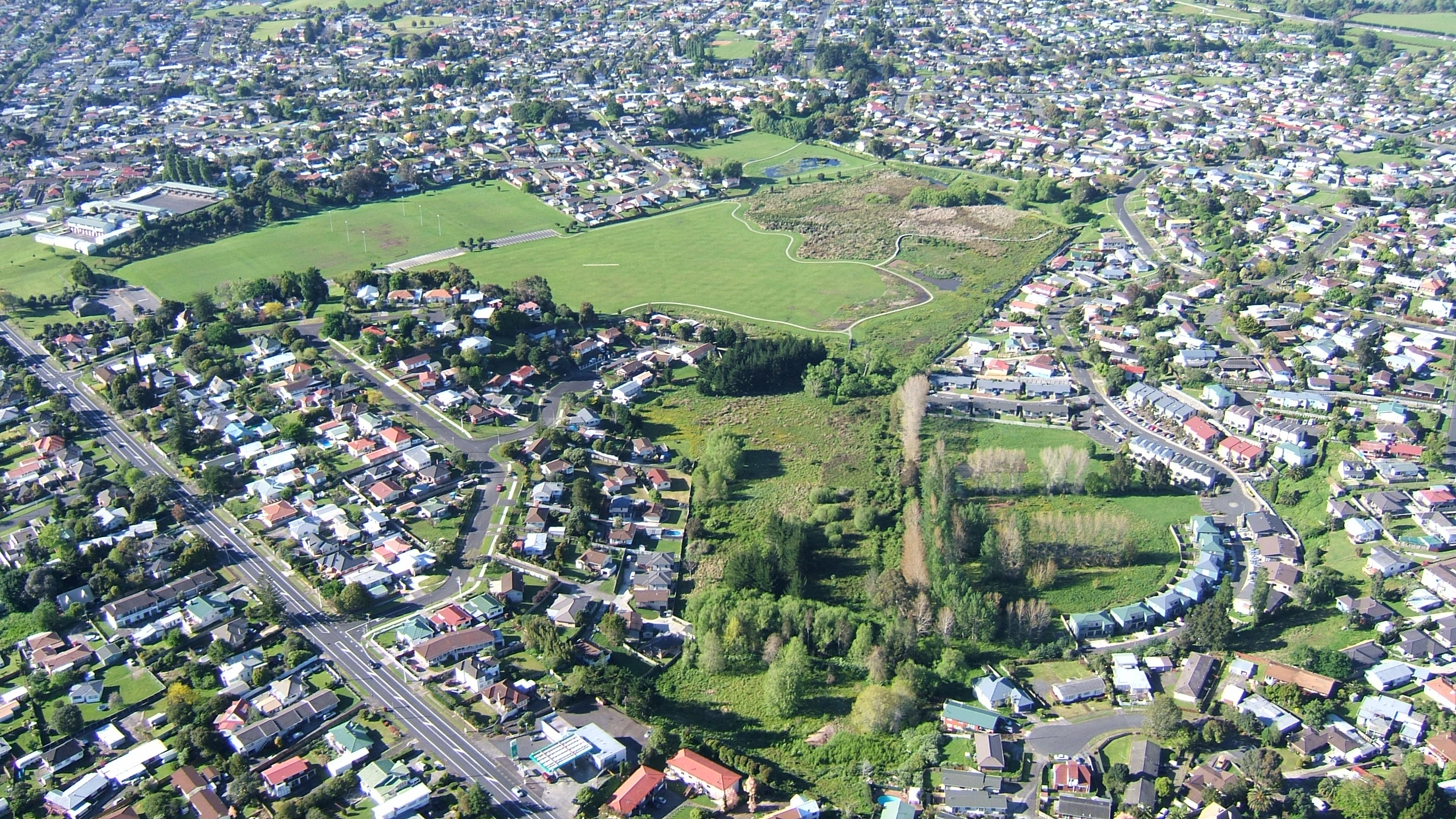
- Kohuora Explosion Crater in 2009

Highest point
- Coordinates: 36.97873°S 174.842691°E

Geography
- Location: North Island, New Zealand

Geology
- Volcanic field: Auckland volcanic field

Kohuora, located in the suburb of Papatoetoe, is one of the volcanoes in the Auckland volcanic field in the North Island of New Zealand.

== Geology and geography ==
The Kohuora complex is a freshwater wetland found in a tuff ring, that has an explosion crater around 600 metres wide and 30 metres deep. Kohuora erupted an estimated 34 million years ago, and the irregular V-shape of the complex indicated that there were at least three explosion crater vents. Peat and lacustrine deposits layer on top of the volcanic soil of the Kohuora.

The Kohuora wetland is an important habitat for native bird and plant species, including Carex subdola, a sedge rare in the Auckland area.

== History ==
The volcano, alongside Māngere Lagoon, Waitomokia, Crater Hill, Pukaki Lagoon and Robertson Hill, is one of the volcanic features collectively referred to as Nga Tapuwae a Mataoho ("The Sacred Footprints of Mataoho"), referring to the deity in Tāmaki Māori myths who was involved in their creation. The name Kohuora means "mists of life", and the volcano is occasionally referred to as Kohuaroa ("The cauldron of life").

== Bibliography ==
- City of Volcanoes: A geology of Auckland - Searle, Ernest J.; revised by Mayhill, R.D.; Longman Paul, 1981. First published 1964. ISBN 0-582-71784-1.
- "Volcanoes of Auckland: The essential guide." - Bruce Hayward, Graeme Murdoch, Gordon Maitland; Auckland University Press, 2011.
- Volcanoes of Auckland: A Field Guide. Hayward, B.W.; Auckland University Press, 2019, 335 pp. ISBN 0-582-71784-1.
