= Crater Hill =

Coordinates: 36.986546°S 174.827135°E

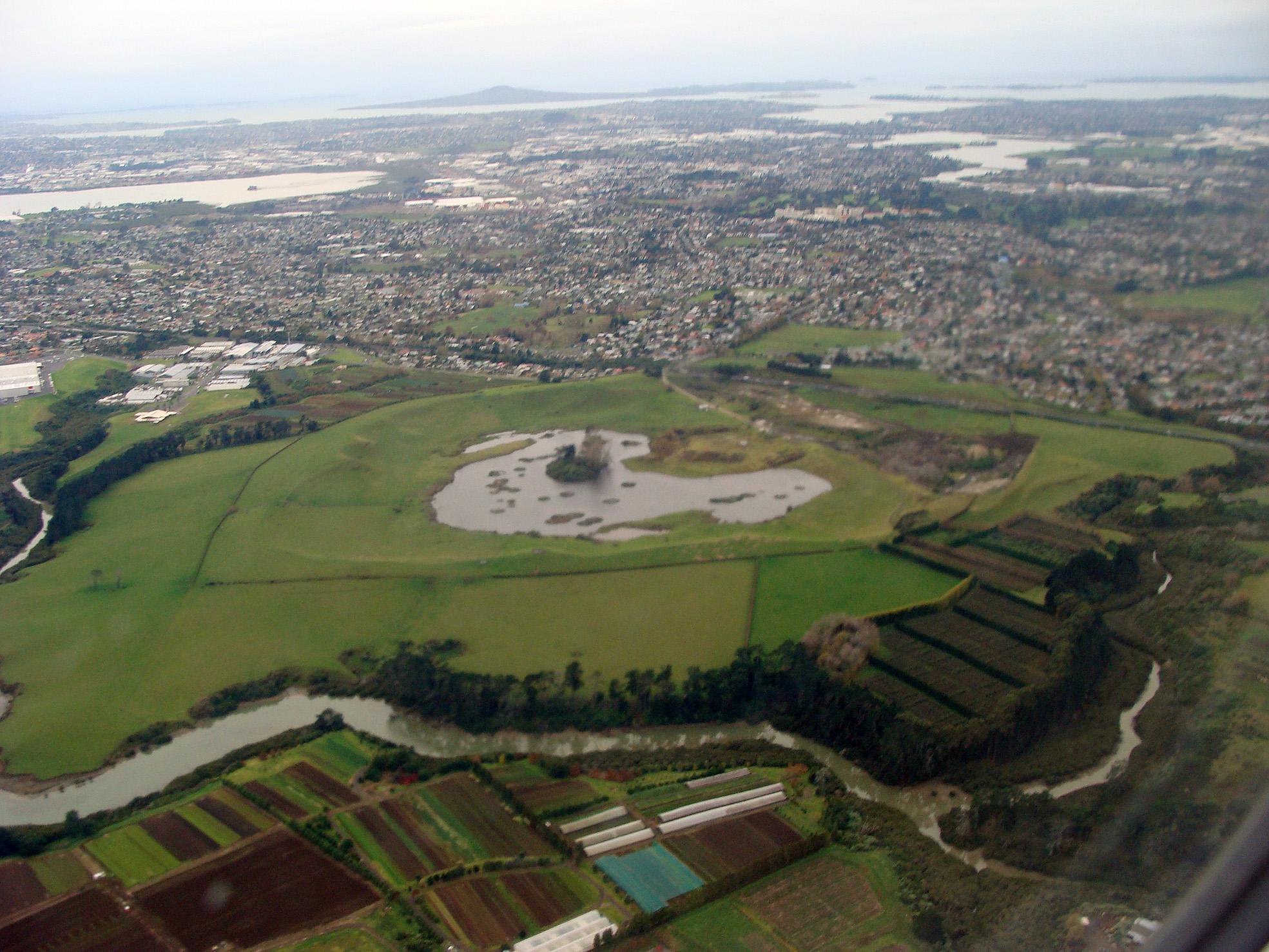
Crater Hill as seen from a plane departing Auckland Airport

Crater Hill is one of the volcanoes of the Auckland volcanic field, in New Zealand. It consists of an explosion crater about 600 metres (2,000 ft) wide, partly filled with water. The hill, alongside Māngere Lagoon, Waitomokia, Kohuora, Pukaki Lagoon and Robertson Hill, is one of the volcanic features collectively referred to as Nga Tapuwae a Mataoho ("The Sacred Footprints of Mataoho"), referring to the deity in Tāmaki Māori myths who was involved in their creation.

Late in the eruption sequence lava welled up inside the explosion crater creating a lava lake. This lake began cooling on the surface and around the edge, creating a solid basalt crust. When the molten lava withdrew back down the volcano's throat, the crust surface collapsed, creating the island in the middle of the present lake, and some of the solid basalt was left around the inside walls of the crater marking the former level of the lava lake. Two lava caves – Selfs and Underground Press Lava Caves – exist beneath the remnant crust on the south side of the crater. Quarrying has removed the small scoria cone in the crater and some of the tuff ring on the northeast side. The Southwestern Motorway was cut through the northeast crater rim and a small explosion crater.
