= Otara (disambiguation) =

Otara or Ōtara can refer to:

- Ōtara, a suburb of South Auckland, New Zealand
- Ōtara, Bay of Plenty, a locality of Ōpōtiki District, New Zealand
- Otara Gunewardene, a Sri Lankan entrepreneur
- Ōtara River, in the north of New Zealand's North Island
- Otara Millionaires Club, a New Zealand music group
- Ōtara-Papatoetoe, a local government area in Auckland
- Otara Hill, one of the volcanoes in the Auckland volcanic field
- Ōtara-Papatoetoe Local Board, one of the 21 local boards of the Auckland Council
- Otara-Mangere, a locality within the Counties Manukau District Health Board
- How Bizarre: The Story of an Otara Millionaire, a documentary film
- Otara College, a school in Otara, Auckland, New Zealand
- Otara Bridge, part of the Ohingaiti railway station
- Otara (New Zealand electorate), a New Zealand parliamentary electorate in Auckland, from 1984 to 1996
- Otara Intermediate School, an intermediate school in Papatoetoe, a suburb of Manukau Ward, Auckland Region, New Zealand
