= Papatoetoe News =

Former newspaper in New Zealand

The Papatoetoe News was the first local newspaper serving the community of Papatoetoe, a suburb of Auckland, New Zealand. It appeared in 1936 and was owned by John Helleur. It was printed in Ōtāhuhu. It was published on a fortnightly basis until it became a weekly in 1958 and ceased publication on 16 September 1964, when it was replaced by the Papatoetoe-Otara Gazette.
