= Waikakariki River =

- Route of the Waikakariki River
- Mouth of the Waikakariki River Waikakariki River (North Island)

Location
- Country: New Zealand

Physical characteristics
- Source: Confluence of Te Wera Stream and Papatukia Stream
  - coordinates: 37°48′28″S 177°47′12″E
- Mouth
  - location: Haparapara River
  - coordinates: 37°48′11″S 177°42′21″E
- Length: 15 km (9 mi)

Basin features
- Progression: Waikakariki River → Haparapara River → Omaio Bay → Bay of Plenty → Pacific Ocean

The Waikakariki River is a river of the eastern Bay of Plenty Region of New Zealand's North Island. It flows west from its sources in the foothills of the Raukūmara Range to reach the Haparapara River 5 kilometres (3 mi) south of Te Kaha.

== See also ==
- List of rivers of New Zealand
