= Koranga River =

- Route of the Koranga River
- Mouth of the Koranga River Koranga River (North Island)

Location
- Country: New Zealand

Physical characteristics
- Source: Confluence of the Koranga Stream and an unnamed stream
  - coordinates: 38°26′13″S 177°21′06″E
- Mouth
  - location: Waioweka River
  - coordinates: 38°23′49″S 177°17′18″E

Basin features
- Progression: Koranga River → Waioweka River → Pakihikura Harbour → Bay of Plenty → Pacific Ocean
- Tributaries
  - left: Karekare Stream
  - right: Moanui Stream

The Koranga River is a river of the northeast of New Zealand's North Island. It lies to the east of Te Urewera National Park, to the southwest of the settlement of Matawai in the Gisborne District, and flows northwest to reach its outflow into the Waioweka River in the Ōpōtiki District.

== See also ==
- List of rivers of New Zealand
