= Douglas Al-Bazi =

Iraqi priest (born 1972)

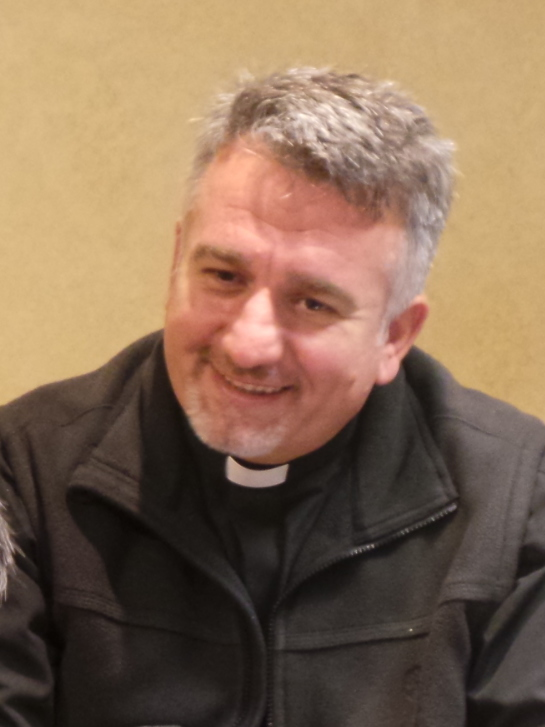
- Born: Douglas Joseph Shimshon Al-Bazi; 1972 (age 53–54); Baghdad, Iraq
- Occupation: Priest

Douglas Joseph Shimshon Al-Bazi (or Douglas Yousef Al Bazi, born 1972 in Baghdad) is a Chaldean Catholic Church parish priest in Auckland, New Zealand, as the leader of the Chaldean Catholic congregation there. He formerly served in Baghdad, Iraq.

== Baghdad parish priest ==
Al-Bazi was vicar of the St. Elia (alt: Elias) Catholic Church, and the adjacent St. Elia Catholic School in the "working class" New Baghdad neighborhood of Baghdad. By 2010, the school had an 82 percent Muslim enrollment, as a result of the exodus of Christians from Iraq. In his autobiography, Norman Kember relates that Al-Bazi described his church as having been bombed ineffectively by unidentified anti-Christian elements and as a church where members of several denominations worshiped together. According to Zenit News Agency the church was attacked twice in the year before Father Douglas was kidnapped; the Father was shot during one of the attacks.

Father Douglas fled from Baghdad, his hometown, to Erbil in 2013.

== Kidnapping ==
In November 2006, Father Douglas was kidnapped by ISI militants. He was tortured and released nine days later. He suffered multiple injuries including two broken vertebrae from his spinal cord, and his face and knees were smashed using a hammer. An AK-47 bullet still remains in his leg. He was released after the Chaldean Catholic Church paid $170,000 in ransom for the release of al-Bazi and Father Samy Al Raiys by their kidnappers.

== Refugee camp priest ==
Al-Bazi is known for sheltering hundreds of war refugees who escaped from the ISIL conquest expansion in August 2014 to Mar Elia Church in Erbil, Iraq where he is the parish priest, and founder and manager of a refugee camp. Father Douglas built the refugee camp in part of the church property previously furnished with benches and used as a small garden, now it is a refuge for Christians fleeing persecution in ISIL-dominated regions of Iraq. Many of the refugees are from Qaraqosh. The camp, which is located in the predominantly Assyrian neighborhood of Ankawa in Erbil, boasts prefabricated housing units, a library, and an emphasis on education. Funding has come predominantly from Canada. By November 2014, Mar Elia, which hosts about 700 refugees, was one of six churches in Erbil sheltering about 3,000 Christian families.

Al-Bazi described the ethnic cleansings being carried out by ISIL in 2015 as "genocide".

In September 2015, the Knights of Columbus released for national broadcast in the U.S. a television commercial featuring Father Douglas in the hope of encouraging more Americans to donate money for the relief of Christian refugees. In the commercial, al Bazi asks viewers to "pray for my people, help my people, and save my people" saying that, "genocide is the easy word for what is happening to my people."

== Anti-Christian genocide in the Middle East ==
Father Al-Bazi has spoken out against the genocide of Christians by ISIL.

== New Zealand ==
In 2016 Fr. Al-Bazi moved to New Zealand where he became parish priest at St. Addai Chaldean Catholic Church, in Papatoetoe. He continues his political activism on behalf of Christians in the Middle East.

== See also ==
- List of kidnappings
- Lists of solved missing person cases
