= Waioweka River =

River in New Zealand

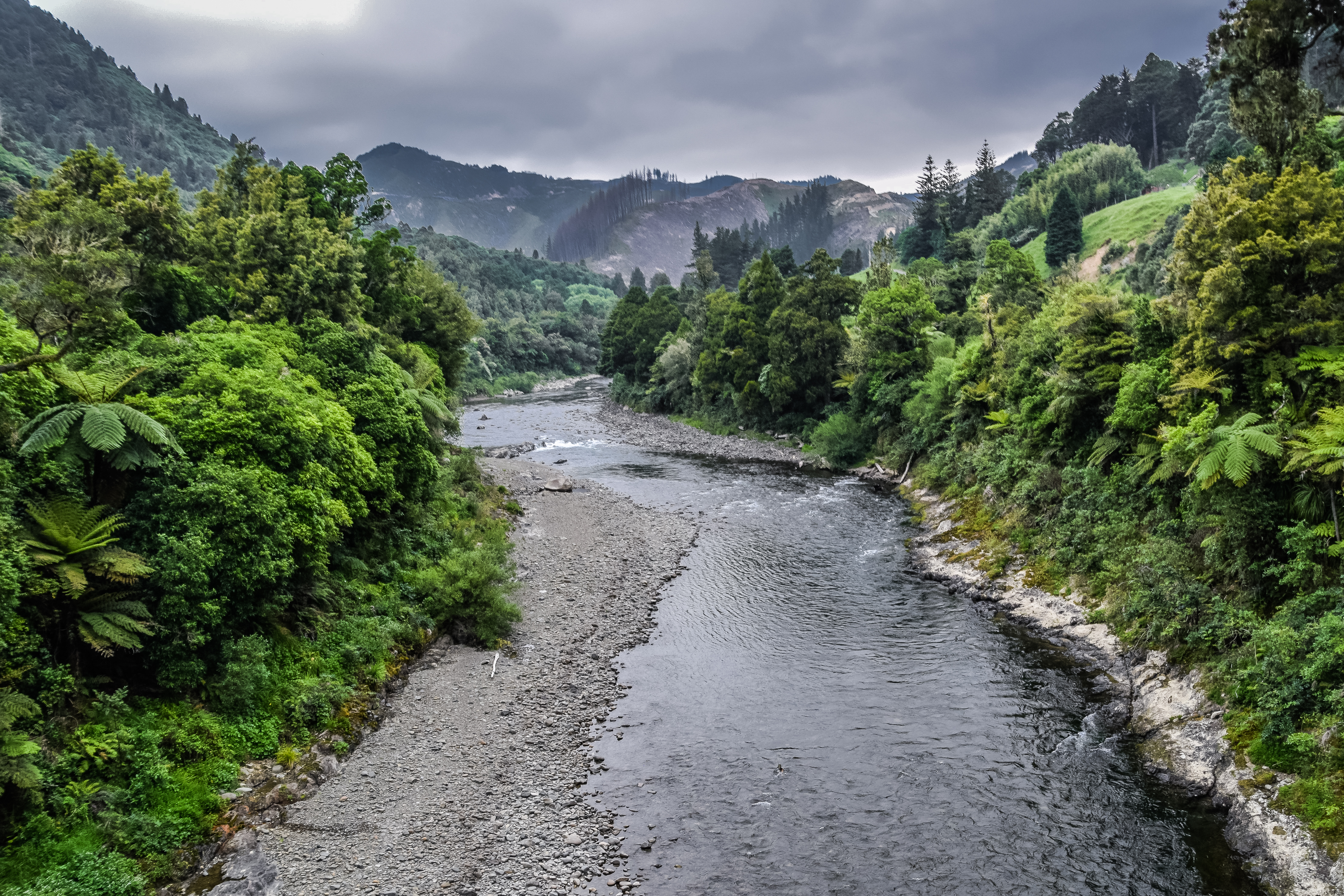
- Waioeka River from the Oponae Bridge
- Route of the Waioweka River
- Mouth of the Waioweka River Waioweka River (North Island)

Location
- Country: New Zealand

Physical characteristics
- Source: Confluence of the Koranga River and Kahunui Stream
  - coordinates: 38°23′48″S 177°17′17″E
- Mouth
  - location: Pakihikura Harbour
  - coordinates: 38°00′05″S 177°16′45″E

Basin features
- Progression: Waioweka River → Pakihikura Harbour → Bay of Plenty → Pacific Ocean
- Tributaries
  - left: Wairato Stream, Oponae Stream, Waiata Stream, Tauranga Stream, Mangaoira Stream, Omuraaka Stream, Ruahema Stream, Otakoi Stream
  - right: Mangakoiti Stream, Okarewa Stream, Okuraata Stream, Opato Stream, Omaukora Stream, Ōhau Stream, Papepeti Stream, Mangapumarumaru Stream, Owhiritoa Stream, Matahanea Creek, Cruen Creek, Marawaiwai Stream
- Waterfalls: Hells Gate Rapids
- Bridges: Oponae Bridge, Tauranga Bridge, Waioweka River Bridge

The Waioeka River is in the eastern Bay of Plenty Region of New Zealand's North Island. Its name was officially changed to Waioweka River in 2024. The river flows northwards for 65 kilometres (40 mi) from Te Urewera National Park to reach the sea at Ōpōtiki. It shares its estuary with the Ōtara River.

== History ==
The area around the Waioeka valley was the scene of fighting during the New Zealand wars.

== Gallery ==
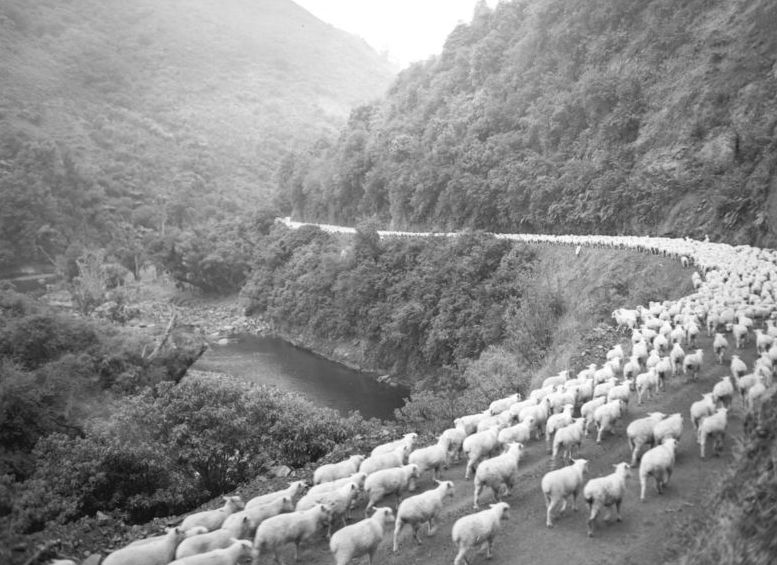
2,600 sheep on the road, Waioeka Gorge, after a 97-kilometre (60 mi) drive

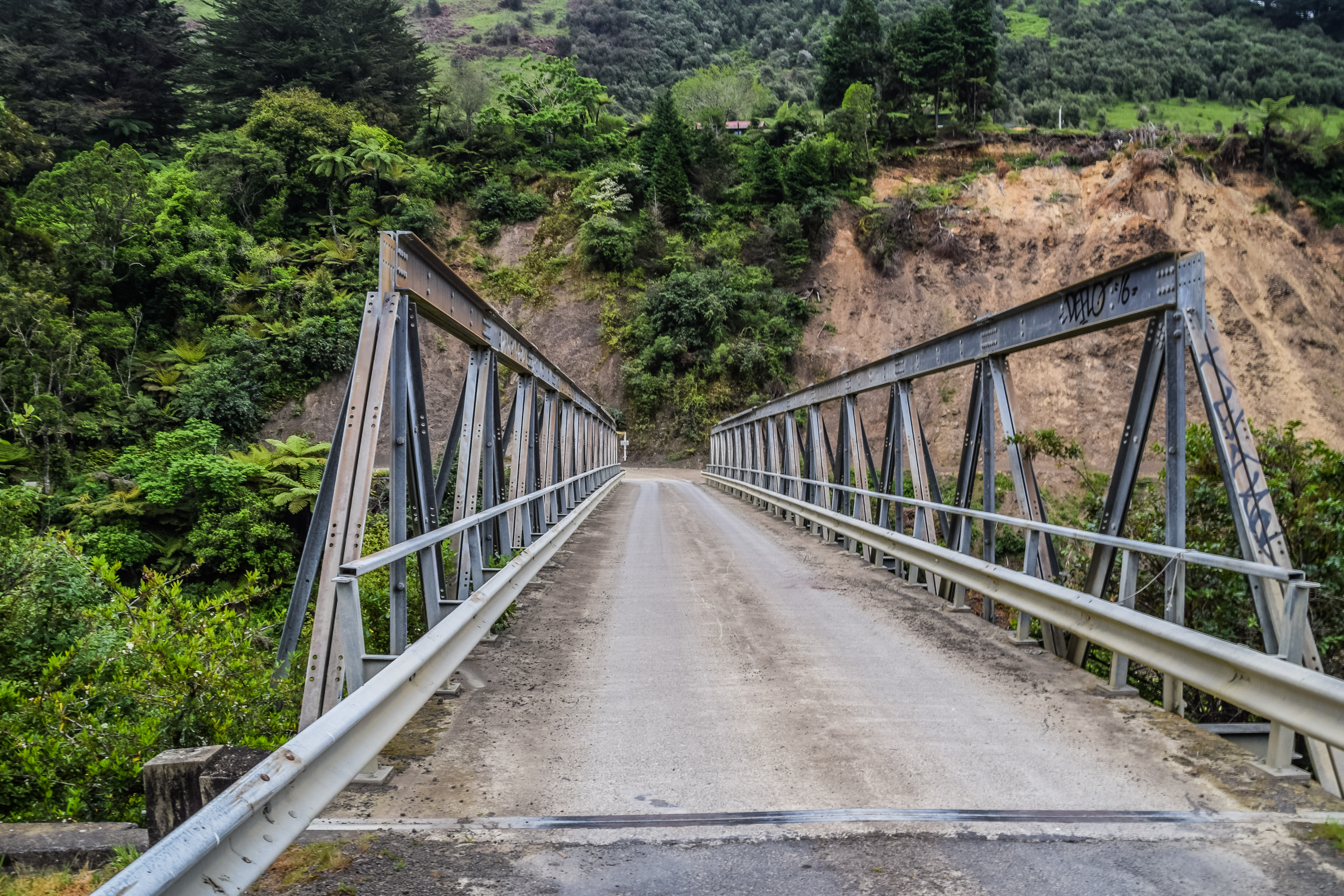
Oponae Bridge

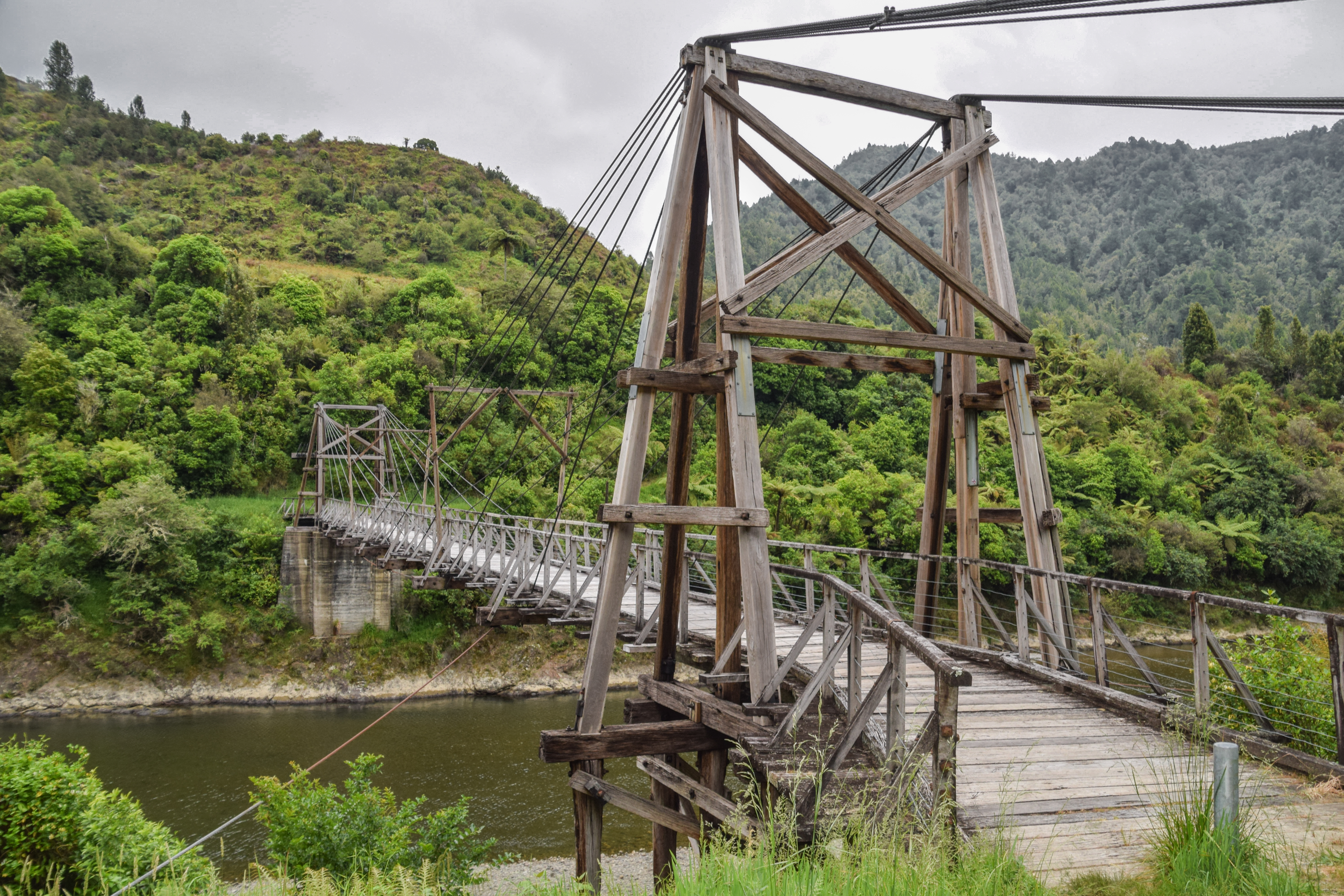
Tauranga Bridge, a historic bridge in the Waioweka Gorge

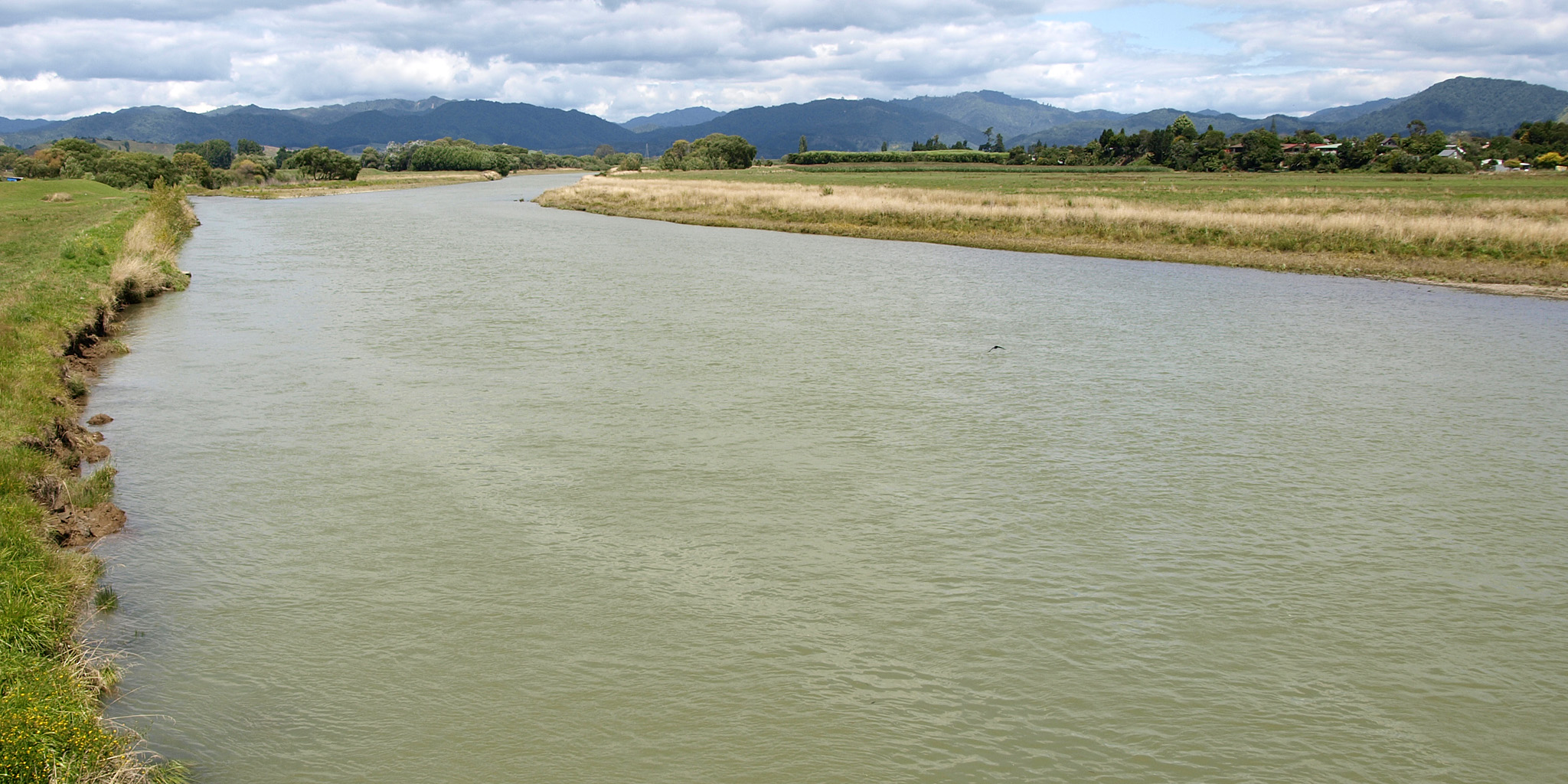
The Waioweka River near Ōpōtiki

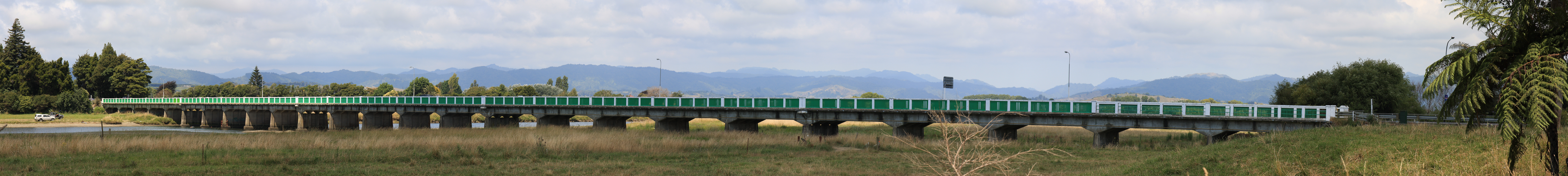
The Waioweka River Bridge near Ōpōtiki

== See also ==
- List of rivers of New Zealand
