= Otahu River =

Coordinates: 37.229531°S 175.877410°E

Location
- Country: New Zealand

Physical characteristics
- Mouth
  - location: Bay of Plenty
- Length: 18 km (11 mi)

The Otahu River is a river of the Coromandel Peninsula, in the Waikato Region of New Zealand's North Island. It flows generally northeast from several streams with watersheds in the Coromandel Range, most notably the Wharekirauponga Stream. The Otahu reaches the sea immediately to the south of the town of Whangamatā.

The New Zealand Ministry for Culture and Heritage gives a translation of "place of Tahu [a personal name]" for Ōtahu.

== See also ==
- List of rivers of New Zealand
