= Dingwall Trust =

Support service for children and families in New Zealand, established 1927

Dingwall Trust of New Zealand
- Predecessor: The school has since closed.The trust only gives out 30 scholarships a year to children that are looking at going to boarding school.
- Formation: 1927
- Type: Child and Family Support Service
- Location: Papatoetoe, Auckland, New Zealand
- Key people: Claudine Young (CEO)
- Affiliations: Presbyterian Church of Aotearoa New Zealand
- Website: dingwalltrust.org.nz
- Remarks: The trust only offers 30 scholarships a year to children looking to board
- Formerly called: Dingwall Presbyterian Orphanage

Dingwall Trust is a Child, Youth and Family approved support service based in Papatoetoe, Auckland, New Zealand. The Trust is a multi-programme agency that provides care for children and young people referred there by private families and government agencies and works with families in their own homes. It also operates residential homes where caregivers provide day-to-day supervision and support.

Its facilities in Papatoetoe are located on an approximately 8-hectare site.

== History ==
The Dingwall Presbyterian Orphanage Trust Board was founded in 1927 on the execution of David Dingwall's will.

The Dingwall Trust School opened in 1996, having operated as a home schooling unit from October 1993, with Anne Stevens as head teacher.

In March 2005, the organisation celebrated its 75th anniversary.

== See also ==
- Children, Young Persons, and Their Families Act 1989
- Presbyterian Church of Aotearoa New Zealand
- Child, Youth and Family (New Zealand)
