= Haparapara River =

- Route of the Haparapara River
- Mouth of the Haparapara River Haparapara River (North Island)

Location
- Country: New Zealand

Physical characteristics
- Source: Raukumara Range
  - coordinates: 37°52′42″S 177°54′10″E
- Mouth
  - location: Omaio Bay
  - coordinates: 37°48′00″S 177°39′27″E

Basin features
- Progression: Haparapara River → Omaio Bay → Bay of Plenty → Pacific Ocean
- Tributaries
  - left: Tokatapu Stream, Ngapueriki Stream, Taroa Stream
  - right: Waikakariki River, Te Kopiha Stream

The Haparapara River is a river in the Bay of Plenty area of New Zealand. It starts in the Raukumara Range and flows north-west where it is joined by the Waikakariki River, then flows in the South Pacific Ocean at Omaio Bay, 9 kilometres (6 mi) south of Te Kaha.

== See also ==
- List of rivers of New Zealand
