= Wentworth River =

Coordinates: 37°14′S 175°50′E

Location
- Country: New Zealand

Physical characteristics
- Source
  - location: Coromandel Range
- Mouth
  - location: Bay of Plenty
- Length: 12 km (7.5 mi)

The Wentworth River is a river of the Coromandel Peninsula, in the Waikato Region of New Zealand's North Island. It flows northeast from the Coromandel Range to reach the Bay of Plenty at Whangamatā.

== See also ==
- List of rivers of New Zealand
