= Kedgley Intermediate School =

Location
- Portage Road, Papatoetoe, Auckland; 36.9764°S 174.8335°E

Information
- Type: State co-ed intermediate (year 7–8)
- Established: 1958
- Ministry of Education Institution no.: 1329
- Principal: Pelu Leaupepetele
- Enrolment: 734 (July 2026)
- Socio-economic decile: 2
- Website: www.kedgley.school.nz

Kedgley Intermediate School is an intermediate school (years 7–8) in Papatoetoe, a suburb of Auckland, New Zealand

The school opened in February 1958 as Papatoetoe Intermediate School. Classes were held in part of Papatoetoe High School for the first year. After principal Maurice F. Kedgley died the school was renamed Kedgley Intermediate School in his memory in 1968, and Otara Intermediate School was renamed Papatoetoe Intermediate School.

Teachers at Kedgley Intermediate have subject specialisations, such as science, social studies and physical education.
