= Kereu River =

- Route of the Kereu River
- Mouth of the Kereu River Kereu River (North Island)

Location
- Country: New Zealand

Physical characteristics
- Source: Hauhauponamu Stream
  - coordinates: 37°47′36″S 177°52′25″E
- Mouth
  - location: Bay of Plenty
  - coordinates: 37°42′37″S 177°43′04″E
- Length: 28 km (17 mi)

Basin features
- Progression: Kereu River → Bay of Plenty → Pacific Ocean
- Tributaries
  - left: Waiti Stream, Ohinetutaekiora Stream, Ponuiahine Stream, Ōwhiro Stream, Te Ana Stream
  - right: Arawhata Stream, Ngawha Stream, Mokuku Stream, Kaumaro Stream, Waharau Stream

The Kereu River is a river of New Zealand's northeastern North Island. It flows northwest from its headwaters, the largest of which is the Hauhauponamu Stream, reaching the sea in the extreme east of the Bay of Plenty, close to the township of Te Kaha.

== See also ==
- List of rivers of New Zealand
