= Hawai River =

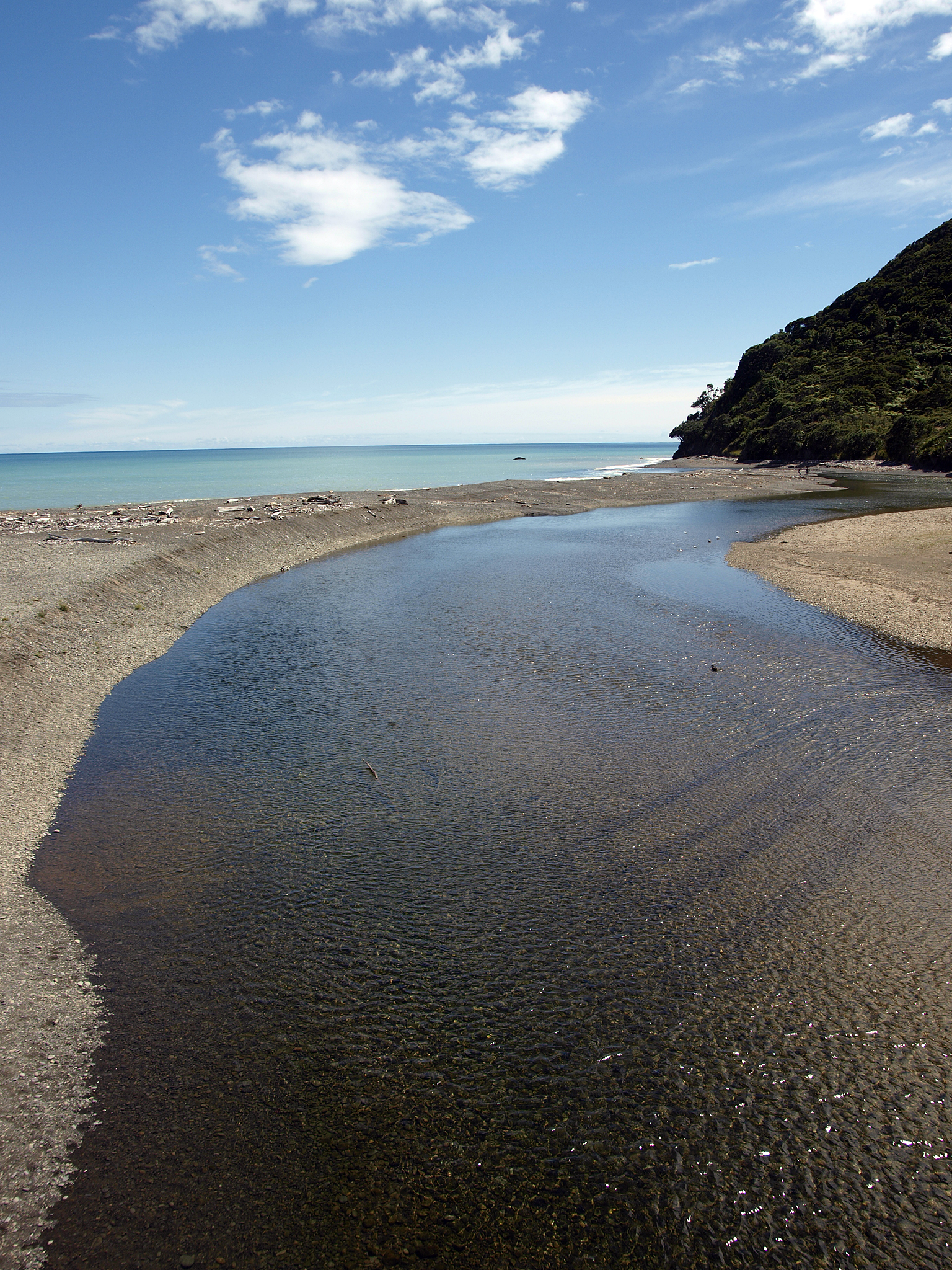
- Hawai River mouth
- Route of the Hawai River
- Mouth of the Hawai River Hawai River (North Island)
- Native name: Hāwai (Māori)

Location
- Country: New Zealand

Physical characteristics
- Source: Confluence of the Pukuranui Stream and an unnamed stream
  - coordinates: 37°56′32″S 177°37′01″E
- Mouth
  - location: Bay of Plenty
  - coordinates: 37°55′11″S 177°31′53″E
- Length: 30 km (19 mi)

Basin features
- Progression: Hawai River → Bay of Plenty → Pacific Ocean
- Tributaries
  - left: Titinui Stream, Te Waiiti Stream
- Bridges: Hawai River Bridge

The Hawai River is a river of New Zealand. It flows from the Raukumara Range northeast into the Bay of Plenty. The locality of Tōrere is 7 kilometres (4 mi) southwest of the river mouth, and Houpoto is 8 kilometres (5 mi) northeast.

== See also ==
- List of rivers of New Zealand
