= Papatoetoe =

- Suburb
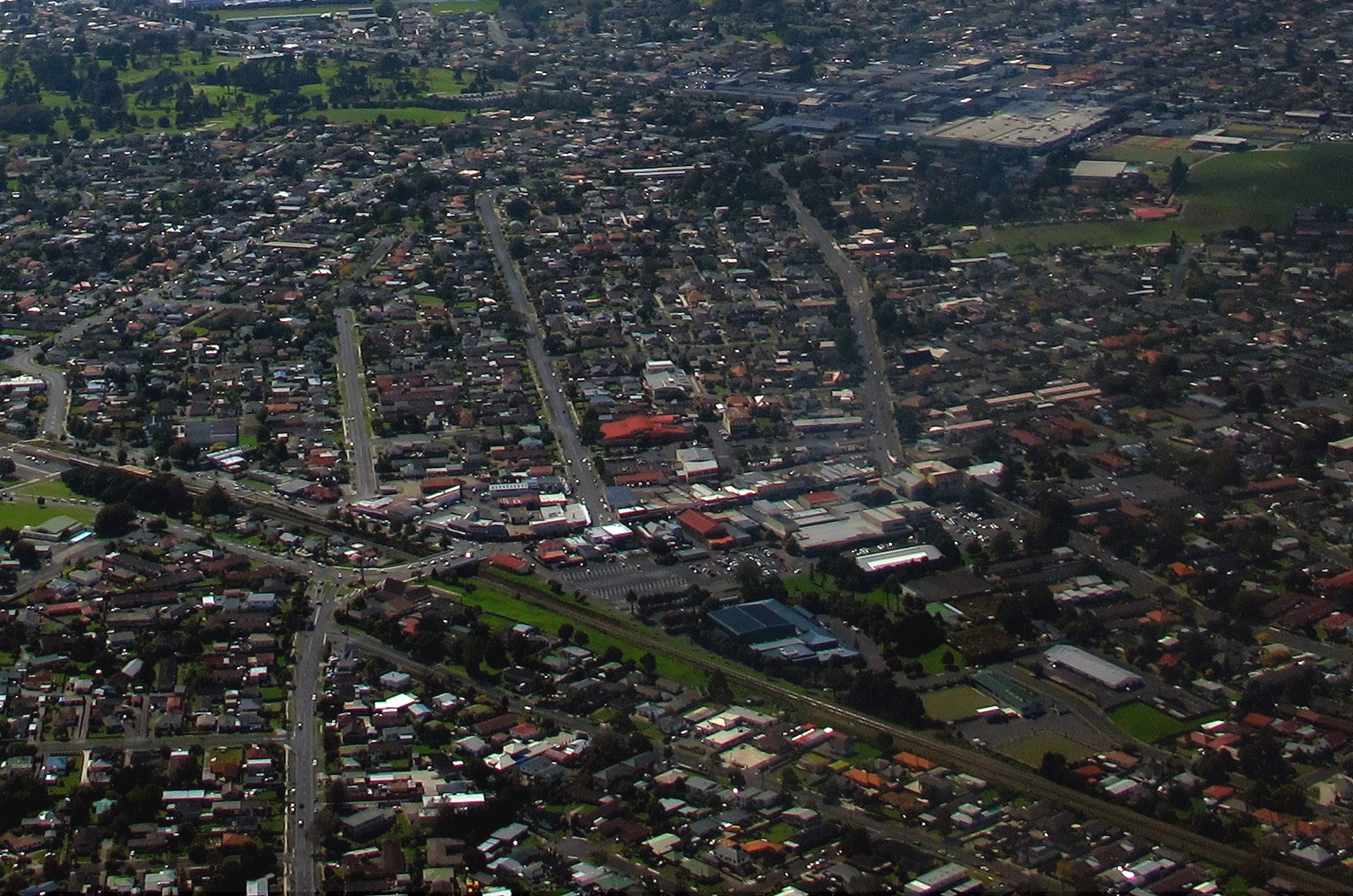
- Aerial view of Papatoetoe
- Interactive map of Papatoetoe
- Coordinates: 36°58′47″S 174°51′04″E
- Country: New Zealand
- City: Auckland
- Local authority: Auckland Council
- Electoral ward: Manukau ward
- Local board: Ōtara-Papatoetoe Local Board

Area
  - Land: 1,134 ha (2,800 acres)

Population (June 2025)
  - Total: 56,010
  - Density: 4,939/km^{2} (12,790/sq mi)
- Train stations: Papatoetoe Train Station; Puhinui Train Station

Māngere East	Middlemore	Ōtara
(Towards Auckland Airport)	Papatoetoe	Flat Bush
(Towards Manukau Harbour)	Manukau Central	Manukau Central

Papatoetoe is a suburb in Auckland, New Zealand. It is the largest suburb in Auckland by population and is located to the northwest of Manukau Central, and 18 kilometres (11 mi) southeast of Auckland CBD.

Papatoetoe was traditionally an important area for Tāmaki Māori, who used a waka portage between the Tāmaki River and Waokauri Creek to reach the Manukau Harbour, as an alternative to the Ōtāhuhu portage to the north. The area developed as a farming community in the 19th century, and grew significantly in the 1950s and 1960s after the Auckland Southern Motorway was constructed. Papatoetoe is now known for its significant population of Indian New Zealanders.

== Etymology ==
Papatoetoe means "grounds where toetoe grows", referring to species of Austroderia grasses that traditionally grew in the area. The name Papatoetoe was first used by English settlers from the 1850s onwards. The spelling Papatoitoi was common in English in the 19th century, and was gradually replaced with Papatoetoe after the local post office began using this spelling.

== Geology ==
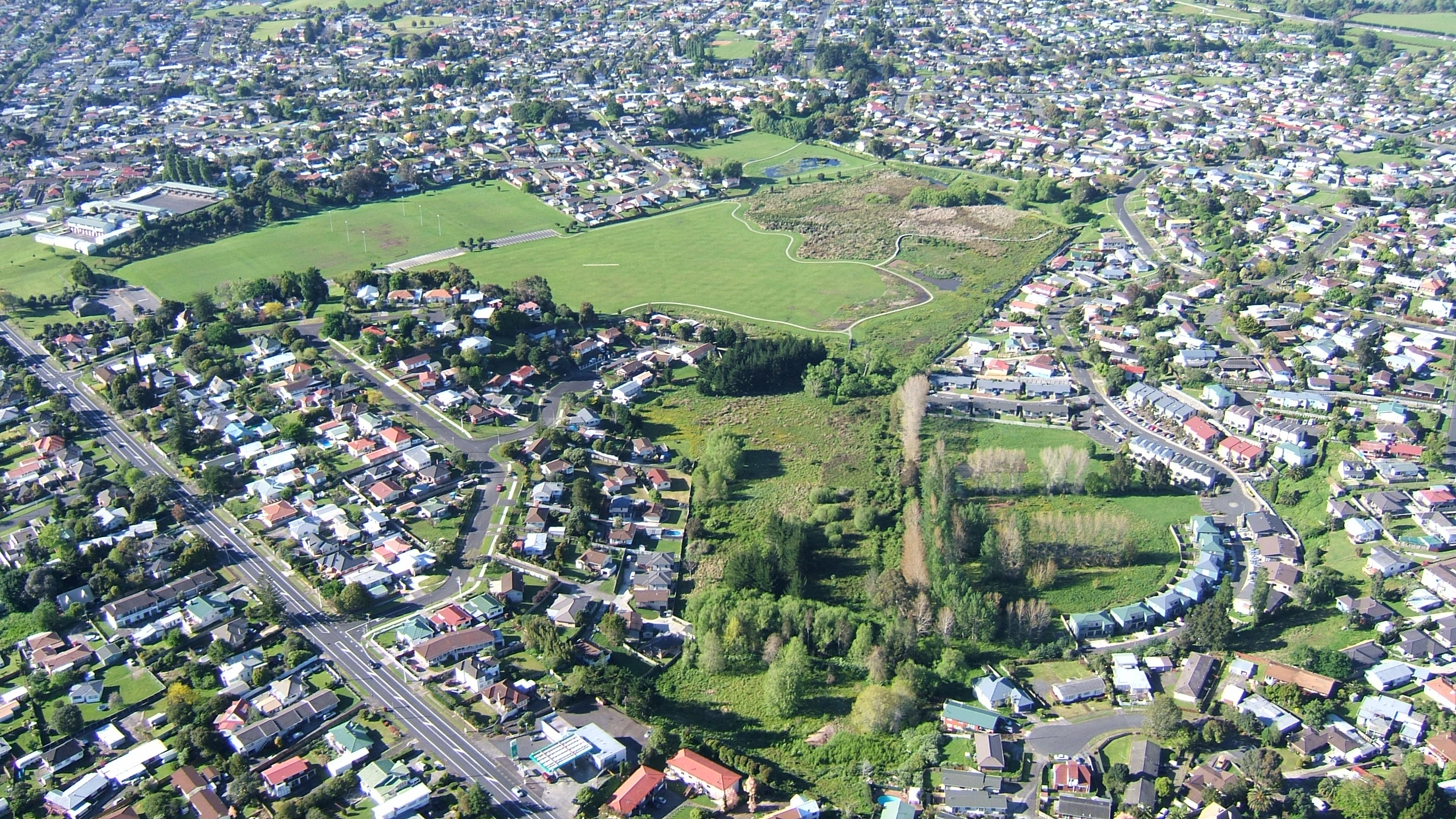
Kohuora is a tuff crater located in Papatoetoe

Papatoetoe is low-lying flat area in South Auckland, located south of the Auckland isthmus and east of the Māngere peninsula. Some features of the Auckland volcanic field can be found around Papatoetoe, including Kohuora, a tuff ring that erupted an estimated 34,000 years ago, becoming a wetland after the crater gradually filled with water and sediment, and Crater Hill, which erupted an estimated 30,000 years ago. The low-lying volcanic features of South Auckland were collectively known by the name Nga Tapuwae a Mataoho ("The Sacred Footprints of Mataoho") to Tāmaki Māori peoples, referring to the deity who was involved in their creation.

Papatoetoe is a flat area between the catchments of the Manukau Harbour in the west and the Tāmaki River to the north-east. Major waterways in the area include the Waokauri Creek, the Puhinui Creek to the south, and the north-flowing Tāmaki River and Ōtara Creek.

The area was forested before human occupation, and by the 1840s was covered in a mix of fern and scrub, including plants such as kānuka, mānuka and toetoe.

== History ==
=== Māori history ===
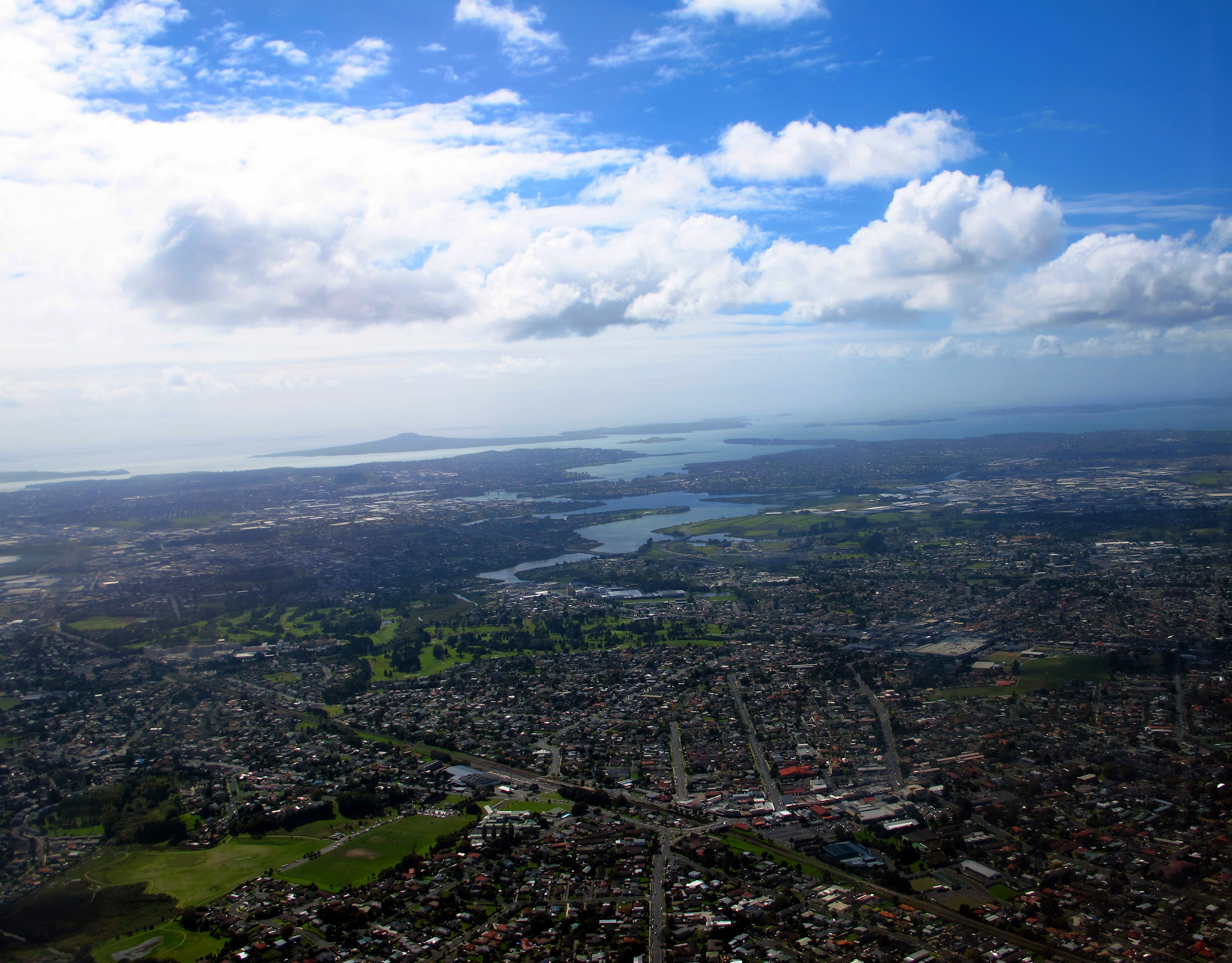
The Waokauri / Pūkaki portage allowed for waka to cross between the Manukau Harbour and the Tāmaki River, south of the Ōtāhuhu portage

The first evidence of Tāmaki Māori in the coastal Manukau Harbour area comes from the 14th century, with evidence of the first settlements later in the 15th century. Papatoetoe formed an important part of the Waokauri / Pūkaki portage, connecting the Manukau Harbour and Tāmaki River, and was often used by Tāmaki Māori to avoid the Te Tō Waka and Karetu portages, controlled by the people who lived at Ōtāhuhu / Mount Richmond. Papatoetoe is within the traditional rohe of Waiohua, including the modern Tainui/Waiohua iwi Te Ākitai Waiohua. A Te Ākitai whakatauki (proverb) defines the boundaries of Papatoetoe:

"Kohuora ki te uru, Tāmaki moana ki uta, he toetoe hei tipare ki waenganui"
"Kohuora to the west, the shores of the Tāmaki River and a head dress of toetoe in the middle".

Compared to other parts of Tāmaki Makaurau (the Auckland Region), there are few fortified pā sites in Papatoetoe due to the flat land. There is one known pā in the Papatoetoe area, at Cemetery Crater (Hillside South Park). The pā is known by the name Te Pā-o-te-tū-tahi-atu, a name that describes the pā as temporary, due to the surrounding flat landscape not being ideal for fortifications.

The Waokauri / Pūkaki portage was actively used during the early colonial era until the 1860s, as a way to transport goods to Papatoetoe.

=== Colonial era ===
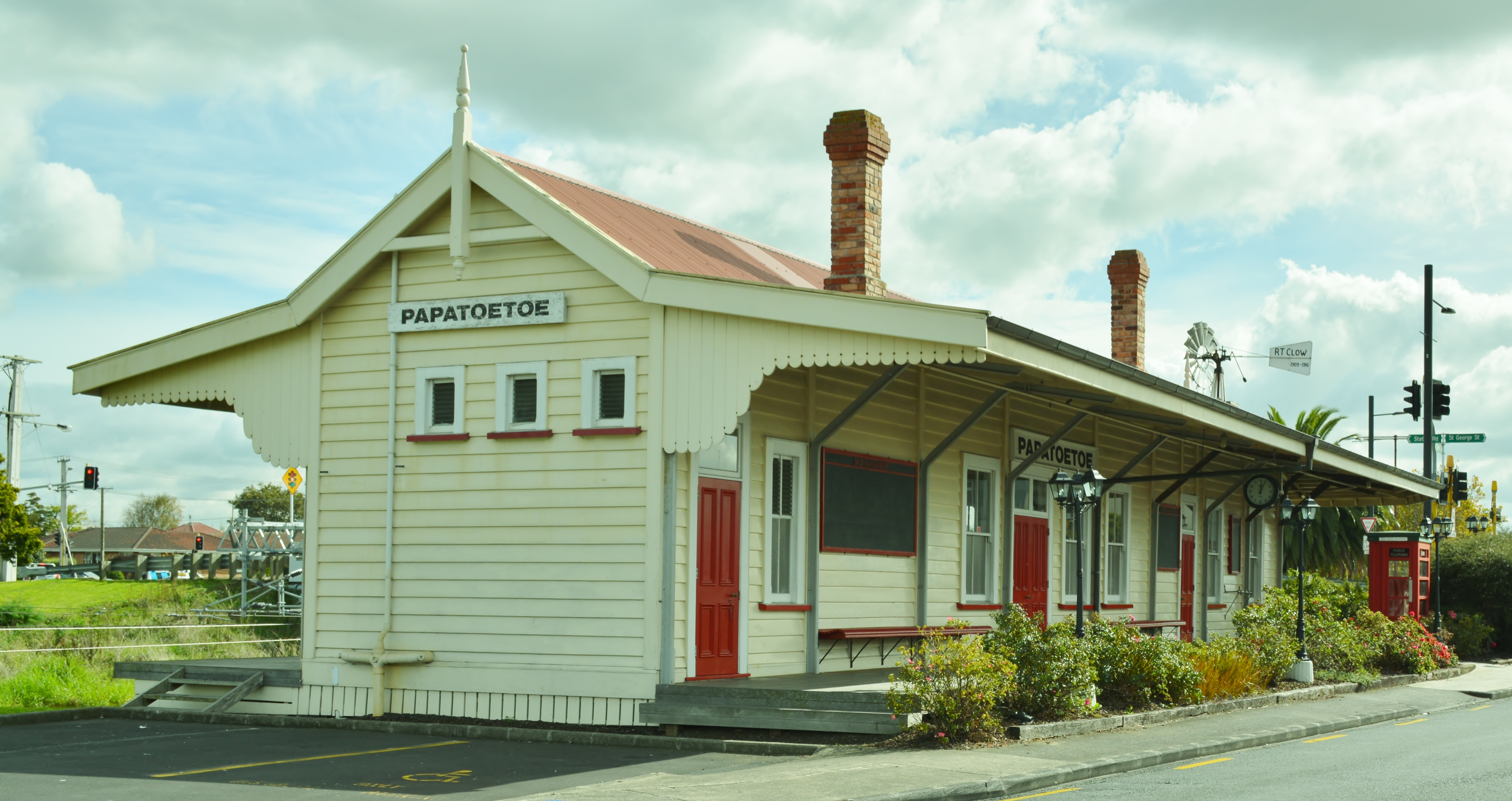
The old Papatoetoe Railway Station

In January 1836 missionary William Thomas Fairburn brokered a land sale between Tāmaki Māori chiefs, Pōtatau Te Wherowhero and Turia of Ngāti Te Rau, covering the majority of modern-day South Auckland between Ōtāhuhu and Papakura. The sale was envisioned as a way to end hostilities in the area, but it is unclear what the chiefs understood or consented to. Māori continued to live in South Auckland, unchanged by this sale. Fairburn was criticised for the sheer size of the purchase, and in 1842 the Crown significantly reduced the size of his land holdings, and the Crown partitioned much of the land for European settlers.

In April 1851, the Tāmaki Bridge was constructed along the Great South Road, spurring growth in the Papatoetoe area. In 1855 the road was metalled, and coach services to Auckland began in 1857 when the road reached as far south as Drury. European settlers began settling in the area from the 1850s, primarily Scottish and Irish Presbyterians. The area was sparsely populated, featuring large country houses such as Hillside, Puhi Nui and Papahinu. The first St Johns Presbyterian Church was built in 1855 (later replaced by wooden Gothic and brick churches). In 1861, Governor George Grey ordered the construction of the Great South Road further into the Waikato, to improve supply lines through swampy and thickly forested country, prior to the Invasion of the Waikato. On 9 July 1863, due to fears of the Māori King Movement, Governor Grey proclaimed that all Māori living in the South Auckland area needed to swear loyalty to the Queen and give up their weapons. Most people refused due to strong links to Tainui, leaving for the south. During this time, the Te Ākitai Waiohua rangatira Īhaka Takaanini was arrested and died on Rakino Island. After the war, the Crown confiscated 1.2 million acres of Māori land around the Waikato, including Waiohua land in South Auckland.

The first local government in the area was the Papatoitoi Highway District, which was defined in 1865 and began meeting from 1868. In 1875, the Papatoetoe railway station opened, connecting Papatoetoe to Auckland in the north. The new township began developing around the railway station, and by the 1880s dairy farming had become popular in the area.

=== Suburban growth ===
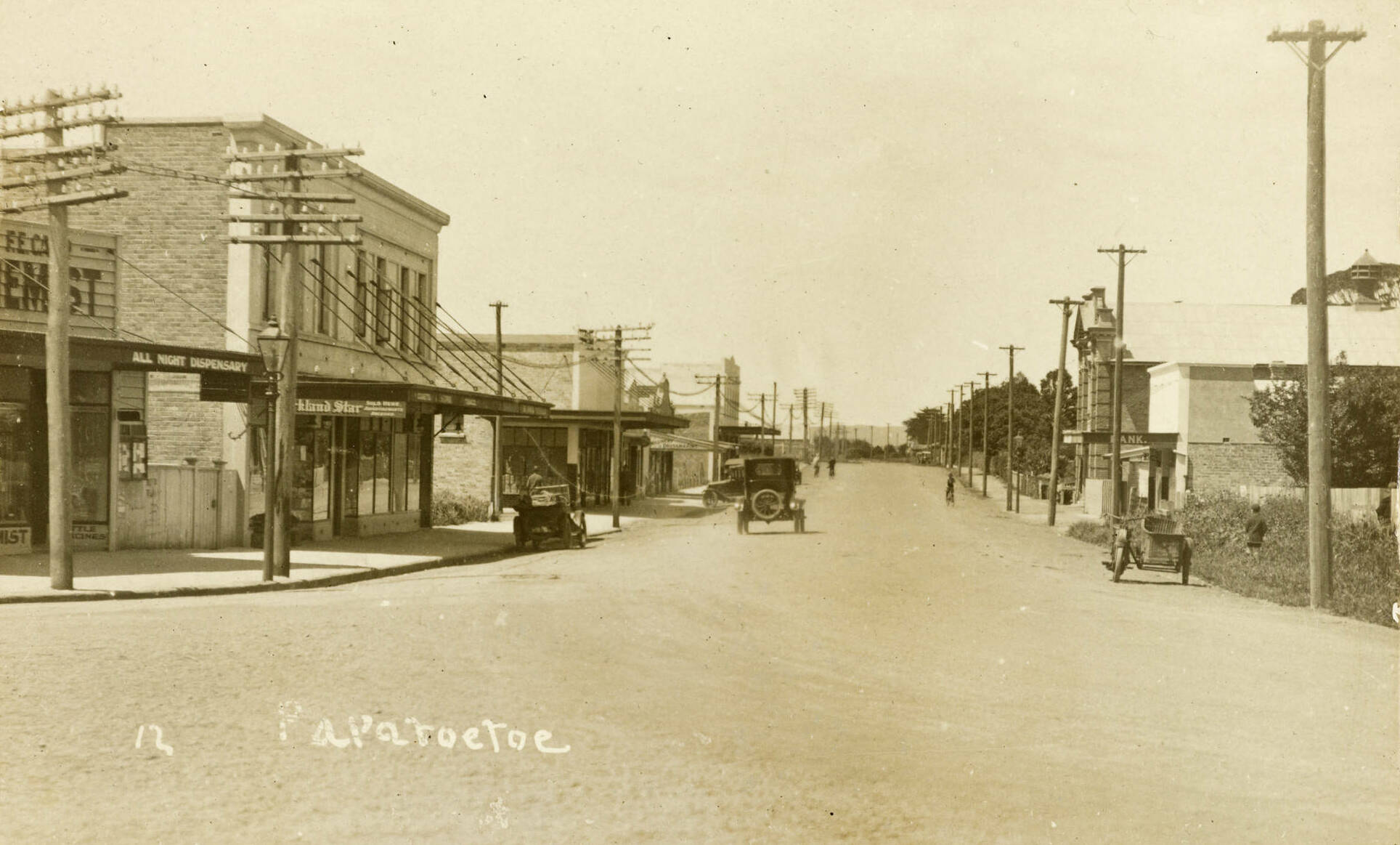
St George Street in Papatoetoe, circa 1925

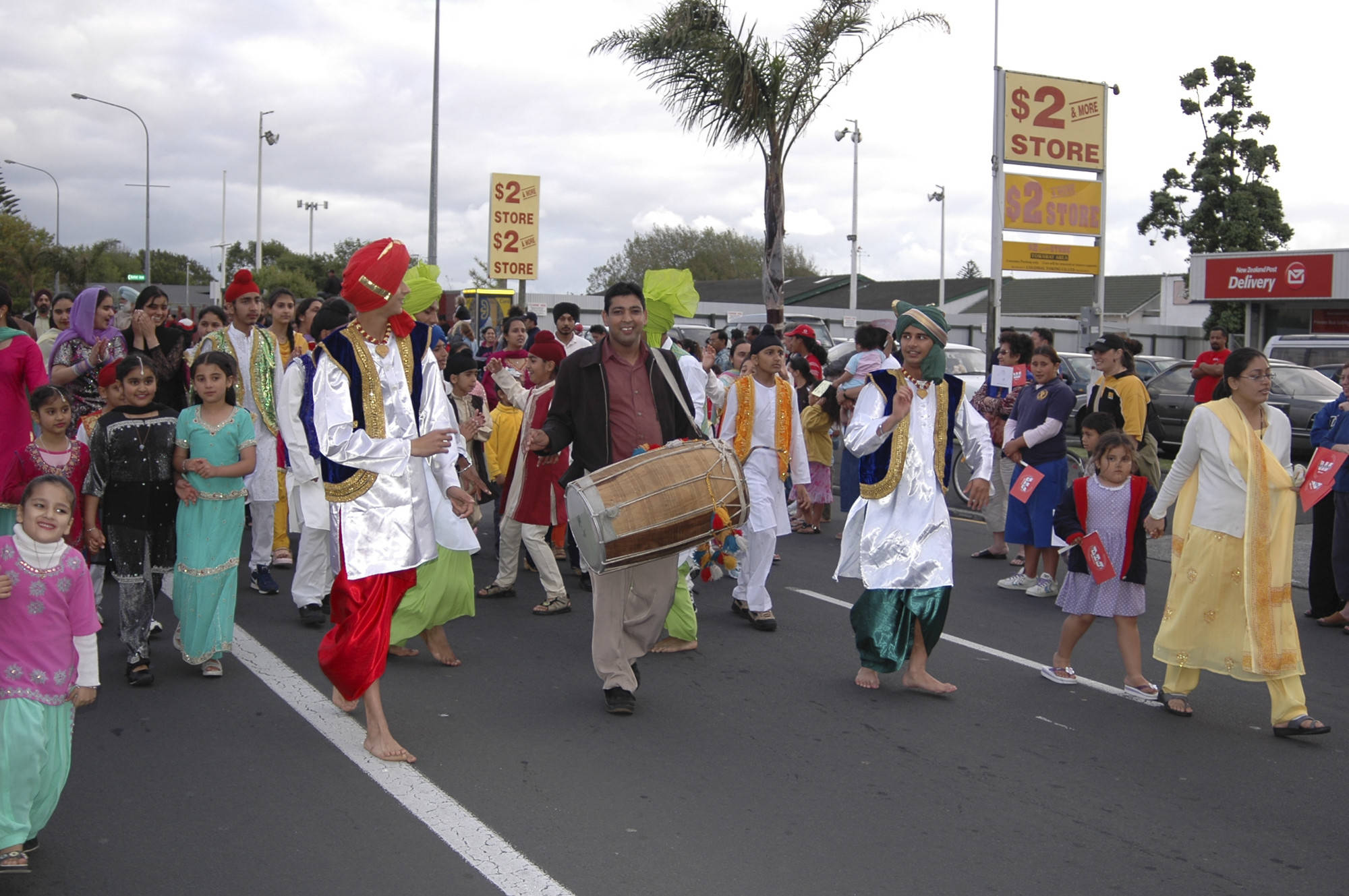
Members of the Punjabi Cultural Association of New Zealand participating in the 2004 Papatoetoe Santa Parade

Housing estates began developing in Papatoetoe in the early 1900s, primarily to the east of the railway station. These included the Kolmar Estate (1903), Central Estate (1912), the Ideal Estate (1913), Llanforda Estate (1913), Station Estate (1913), and the Green Park Estate (1914). By 1911, the population of Papatoetoe had doubled to 400 people. In March 1912, a temporary military camp was established for the 3rd (Auckland) Regiment at Puhinui.

In 1918, a public hall was constructed for Papatoetoe, and in the following year growth in the area meant that Papatoetoe became a town district. Papatoetoe became one of the fastest growing areas of Auckland in the 1920s, and a second commercial area began to develop in Papatoetoe, at the motor bus service terminus on Great South Road, near the Hunter's tearooms, which developed into Hunters Corner. During the Great Depression, growth slowed in Papatoetoe, and the area became known for poultry farming. In 1929, the Waitemata Brewery opened near Papatoetoe, operated by the Dominion Brewery.

During World War II, the Cambria Park estate was requisitioned by the Public Works Department, who constructed a military camp for 6,000 troops from the United States Army. Middlemore Hospital opened in 1947, intended as a temporary military hospital, later becoming permanent.

Papatoetoe grew large enough to become a borough in 1946. In the late 1940s and early 1950s, the Māori Affairs Department of the New Zealand Government encouraged growth in the Papatoetoe area, leading to an influx of Urban Māori moving from rural areas of the country.

The development of the Auckland Southern Motorway led to an explosion in the population of Papatoetoe, with the population increasing four times in the post-World War II period. The motorway opened between Ellerslie and Redoubt Road in 1955. In 1958, the first modern supermarket in New Zealand was opened in Papatoetoe, by Tom Ah Chee, Norm Kent and John Brown, and in 1962 Nestlé opened a factory at Cambria Park in Papatoetoe, becoming a major employer in the area.

Papatoetoe became a city in 1965, and was amalgamated into Manukau City in 1989. In 1991, the Hunters Plaza mall was opened. Population growth had mostly ceased and remained stagnant throughout the 1990s and early 2000s, however a significant increase in population occurred after 2006 due to high rates of immigration and changes to the Auckland Unitary Plan allowing more intensive infill housing on large sections. Papatoetoe has the unofficial title of Auckland's Little India, with 40 percent of the suburb's population being of Indian ethnicity according to the 2018 census.

== Local government ==
The first local government in the area was the Papatoitoi Highway District, which was defined in 1865. This was succeeded by the Papatoetoe Town Board in 1919. In 1946, population growth led to Papatoetoe becoming a borough, and by 1965 Papatoetoe became a city. The borough expanded in 1950 when 320 acres (130 ha) was added from Manukau County, and a further 654 acres (265 ha) transferred to Papatoetoe in 1959. With the local government reforms of 1989, Papatoetoe was amalgamated into the Manukau City.

In November 2010, all cities and districts of the Auckland Region were amalgamated into a single body, governed by the Auckland Council. Papatoetoe is a part of the Ōtara-Papatoetoe local board area within the Manukau Ward. Elected representatives sit on the Ōtara-Papatoetoe Local Board, and two Manukau ward councillors sit on the Auckland Council.

The old Papatoetoe City Council building is at 91 Cambridge Terrace, Papatoetoe.

=== List of mayors ===
	Name	Term
Papatoetoe Borough Council
1	Victor Maurice Tracey	1946–1948
2	Thomas Richard Smytheman	1948–1953
3	Cyril James Mahon	1953–1959
4	Lee Isbister Murdoch	1959–1965
Papatoetoe City Council
5	Bob White	1965–1986
6	Allan Walter Brewster	1986–1989

== Demographics ==
Papatoetoe covers 11.34 km^{2} (4.38 sq mi) and had an estimated population of 56,010 as of June 2025, with a population density of 4,939 people per km^{2}.

Historical population
Year	Pop.	±% p.a.
2006	34,188	—
2013	39,408	+2.05%
2018	45,024	+2.70%
2023	47,907	+1.25%
The 2006 population is for a smaller area of 11.10 km^{2}. Source:

Papatoetoe had a population of 47,907 in the 2023 New Zealand census, an increase of 2,883 people (6.4%) since the 2018 census, and an increase of 8,499 people (21.6%) since the 2013 census. There were 24,063 males, 23,757 females and 87 people of other genders in 13,275 dwellings. 2.1% of people identified as LGBTIQ+. The median age was 32.1 years (compared with 38.1 years nationally). There were 10,614 people (22.2%) aged under 15 years, 11,220 (23.4%) aged 15 to 29, 21,738 (45.4%) aged 30 to 64, and 4,335 (9.0%) aged 65 or older.

People could identify as more than one ethnicity. The results were 16.3% European (Pākehā); 13.1% Māori; 35.5% Pasifika; 48.1% Asian; 1.2% Middle Eastern, Latin American and African New Zealanders (MELAA); and 0.9% other, which includes people giving their ethnicity as "New Zealander". English was spoken by 88.0%, Māori language by 2.9%, Samoan by 11.2%, and other languages by 37.2%. No language could be spoken by 3.3% (e.g. too young to talk). New Zealand Sign Language was known by 0.4%. The percentage of people born overseas was 51.8, compared with 28.8% nationally.

Religious affiliations were 38.0% Christian, 17.5% Hindu, 6.9% Islam, 1.1% Māori religious beliefs, 2.0% Buddhist, 0.1% New Age, and 9.8% other religions. People who answered that they had no religion were 18.9%, and 6.1% of people did not answer the census question.

Of those at least 15 years old, 7,275 (19.5%) people had a bachelor's or higher degree, 16,191 (43.4%) had a post-high school certificate or diploma, and 13,824 (37.1%) people exclusively held high school qualifications. The median income was $40,000, compared with $41,500 nationally. 1,935 people (5.2%) earned over $100,000 compared to 12.1% nationally. The employment status of those at least 15 was that 20,040 (53.7%) people were employed full-time, 3,324 (8.9%) were part-time, and 1,572 (4.2%) were unemployed.

Individual statistical areas
Name	Area (km^{2})	Population	Density (per km^{2})	Dwellings	Median age	Median income
Grange	1.43	2,427	1,697	540	28.5 years	$33,500
Papatoetoe North	0.73	3,726	5,104	1,089	32.1 years	$40,100
Dingwall	0.65	2,781	4,278	747	32.8 years	$41,400
Aorere South West	0.69	2,652	3,843	711	31.4 years	$41,300
Aorere South East	0.61	2,613	4,284	648	30.3 years	$39,400
Papatoetoe North West	0.77	3,159	4,103	804	29.8 years	$39,200
Papatoetoe West	0.76	3,903	5,136	1,074	31.8 years	$40,500
Papatoetoe Central East	0.89	3,261	3,664	1,038	34.5 years	$39,700
Papatoetoe Central West	0.83	3,372	4,063	1,131	34.7 years	$40,900
Papatoetoe North East	0.61	3,327	5,454	945	32.0 years	$38,300
Papatoetoe East	0.78	3,483	4,465	972	31.6 years	$39,100
Papatoetoe South West	0.70	3,099	4,427	795	30.2 years	$38,700
Papatoetoe South	0.65	3,549	5,460	978	33.5 years	$42,600
Puhinui North	0.70	3,984	5,691	1,158	32.7 years	$41,900
Puhinui South	0.53	2,574	4,857	651	31.8 years	$41,000
New Zealand					38.1 years	$41,500

== Economy ==
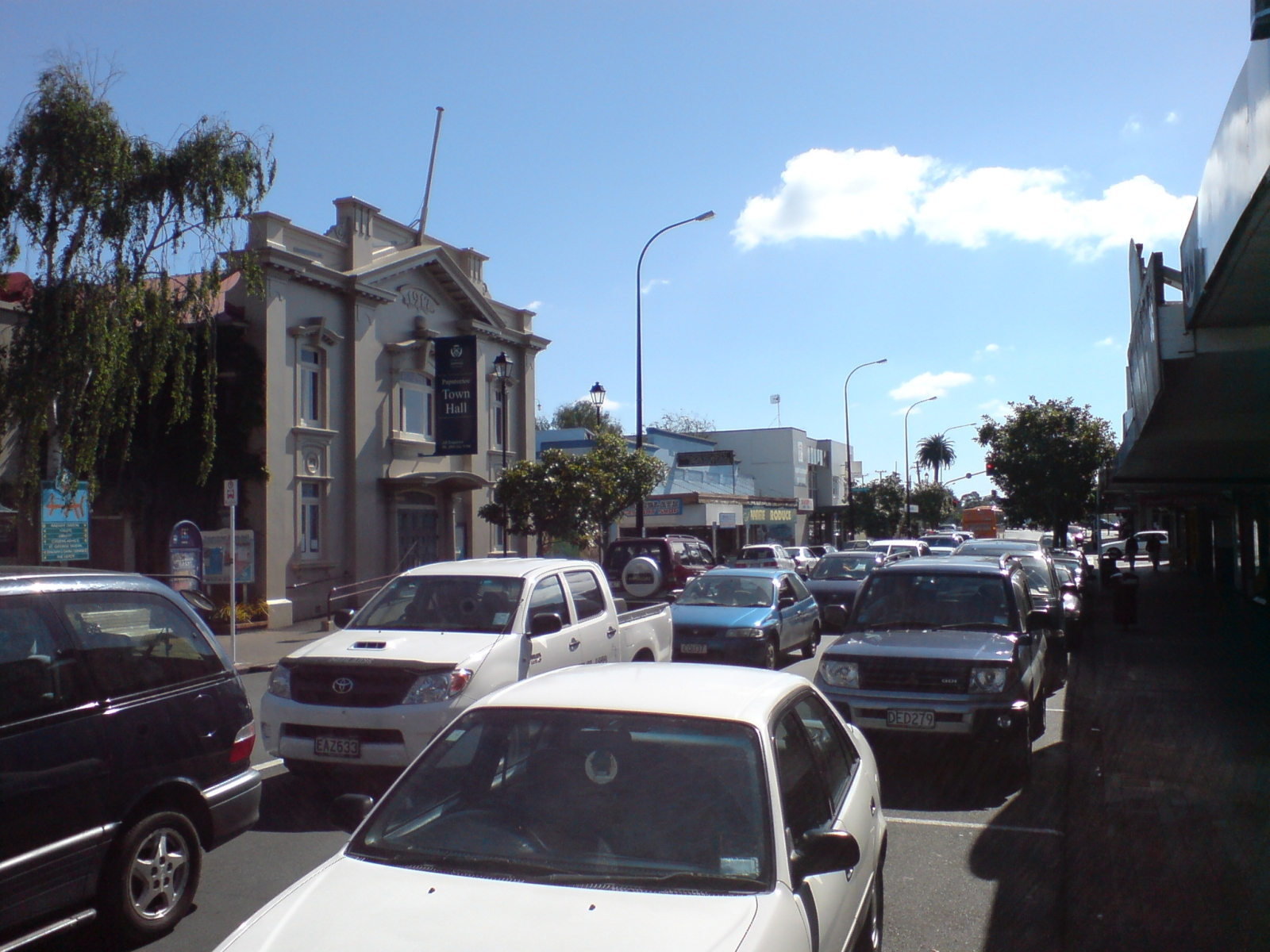
St George Street, Town Centre.

=== Papatoetoe Town Centre ===
In early 2009, planning began to revitalise the town centre in the St. George Street area. The plan envisaged new apartment buildings and nearby sports facilities bringing more business to the area, which had struggled due to competition from shopping malls.

=== Hunter's Corner ===
Hunter's Corner has become a popular shopping area for shoppers of Indian origin. Hunter's Corner accounts for 60 retail outlets of which about 40 have some form of Indian flavour.

Hunter's Corner used to be a notorious area for prostitution in the early 2000s due to it being relatively safer compared to similar town centres in South Auckland, however prostitution has largely disappeared in recent times after strong opposition from local residents.

=== Hunters Plaza ===
The Hunters Plaza shopping mall opened in 1991 and was upgraded in 2015. It features 47 stores, including Kmart and Woolworths.

== Transport ==
Papatoetoe contains two train stations within the suburban limits. These include the Papatoetoe railway station situated in Old Papatoetoe and nearby Puhinui railway station situated in Puhinui Road. The East West and the South City Line serve both train stations. During peak times there is a train approximately every 5 minutes towards Waitematā. It takes approximately 30 minutes from Papatoetoe railway station into Waitematā. The Puhinui Station Interchange was upgraded in July 2021 to provide a rapid transit network to Auckland Airport, as well as forming a connection with Manukau. It takes approximately 10–12 minutes from Puhinui Station to Auckland Airport.

Auckland Southern Motorway and Southwestern Motorway connect Papatoetoe with Auckland City and Manukau. Southwestern Motorway interchanges are on Puhinui Road to the south and Massey Road in Māngere East to the north. The Southern Motorway interchange is on East Tamaki Road.

== Sports ==
=== Association football ===
Papatoetoe is home to Papatoetoe AFC who compete in the Lotto Sport Italia NRFL Division 1A. Papatoetoe is home to Papatoetoe United who play from the sports complex on Great South Road and are affiliated with Auckland Football Federation.

=== Cricket ===
Papatoetoe is home to the Papatoetoe Cricket Club who play in the Auckland Cricket Championship.

=== Rugby league ===
Papatoetoe is home to the Papatoetoe Panthers who are affiliated with the Auckland Rugby League.

=== Rugby union ===
Papatoetoe Rugby Football Club was established in 1946 and plays home matches at the Papatoetoe Sport Complex on Great South Road.

=== Tennis ===
Papatoetoe is home to two tennis clubs, Papatoetoe Tennis Club located at Papatoetoe Sports Complex and Sunnyside Tennis Club located in the Sunnyside Domain. Both clubs are affiliated to Auckland Tennis. Sunnyside Tennis Club was formed originally as Puhunui Tennis Club in 1955.

== Education ==
=== Primary education ===
Papatoetoe has five primary schools in its zone:

- Holy Cross School is a Catholic full primary school (years 1–8) integrated with the state system. Founded in 1953, it has a roll of 550.
- Papatoetoe Central School is a state contributing primary school (years 1–6) with a roll of 903. Founded in 1857, the school moved to its current site in 1872.
- Papatoetoe East School is a state contributing primary school (years 1–6). It was established in 1958 and currently has a roll of 584.
- Papatoetoe South School is a state contributing primary school (years 1–6). It has a roll of 590.
- Papatoetoe West School is a state contributing primary school (years 1–6) which opened in 1949. It has a roll of 670.

In addition, Papatoetoe North School, Puhinui School and South Auckland Seventh-day Adventist School could be considered to be in Papatoetoe.

Papatoetoe has one intermediate school:

- Papatoetoe Intermediate School is a state school for years 7–8 with a roll of 722.

Kedgley Intermediate is on the boundary of the Papatoetoe area.

=== Secondary education ===
Papatoetoe has two secondary schools:

- Papatoetoe High School is a state secondary school (years 9–13) with a roll of 1,815.
- Aorere College is a state secondary school (years 9–13) with a roll of 1,701.

All these schools are coeducational. Rolls are as of July 2026.

Dingwall Trust, a local Presbyterian orphanage, was previously a registered school and now provides scholarships to a small number of eligible students.

== Papatoetoe Historical Society ==
Papatoetoe Historical Society was established in 1988 with the aim to gather the historical artefacts and information from the Papatoetoe district. The collection held includes a collation of information on Local Body members, schools as they developed, the origin and meaning of street names, women of the district (book available), people of the surrounding farming district, newspaper cuttings and information on local organisations. The society has also developed an archive collection which includes photographs, books, booklets, plans and posters. These collections can be viewed at the Papatoetoe Historical Society museum, currently being set up at the Papatoetoe Chambers, 35 St George St, Papatoetoe following its relocation from The Depot.

In 2012, Papatoetoe celebrated 150 years of civic life. The Papatoetoe 150 was initiated by the Papatoetoe Historical society to increase awareness of history and promote community organisations.

== Notable people ==
- Douglas Al-Bazi, refugee from Iraq
- Len Brown - Former Mayor of Auckland
- Barry Crump – Author, poet
- David Dallas – Hip Hop Artist
- Dillon Boucher - NZ Basketball Player, lived in Papatoetoe and went to Papatoetoe High School
- Ricki Herbert – Soccer player – Played National Level for the All Whites and is their current coach. Also played for New Zealand in the Football World Cup Finals 1982
- Phil Goff – Mayor of Auckland, Former Labour Party Leader, Foreign and Defence Minister, lived in Papatoetoe and attended Papatoetoe High School
- Mike King - Mental Health Advocate
- Kyle Jamieson - NZ Cricketer, lived in Papatoetoe
- Keven Mealamu - Former All Black. Lived in Papatoetoe and attended Aorere College
- Trevor Meale – Cricketer
- David Shearer - Former Labour Party Leader, lived in Papatoetoe and attended Papatoetoe High School
- Ish Sodhi - NZ Cricketer, lived in Papatoetoe and attended Papatoetoe High School
- Tyree Tautogia – Part of rap group Smashproof
- Gary Troup – Played club cricket in Papatoetoe going on to represent New Zealand 1976 – 1986
- Heather Matthews (née Thompson) – Silver Medalist 1978 Commonwealth Games (3000 m). MBE – Services To Sport, Papatoetoe Sports Person of the Year.
- Dei Hamo - Musician, attended Aorere College, referenced Papatoe in his top charting track We Gon' Ride.

== Attractions ==
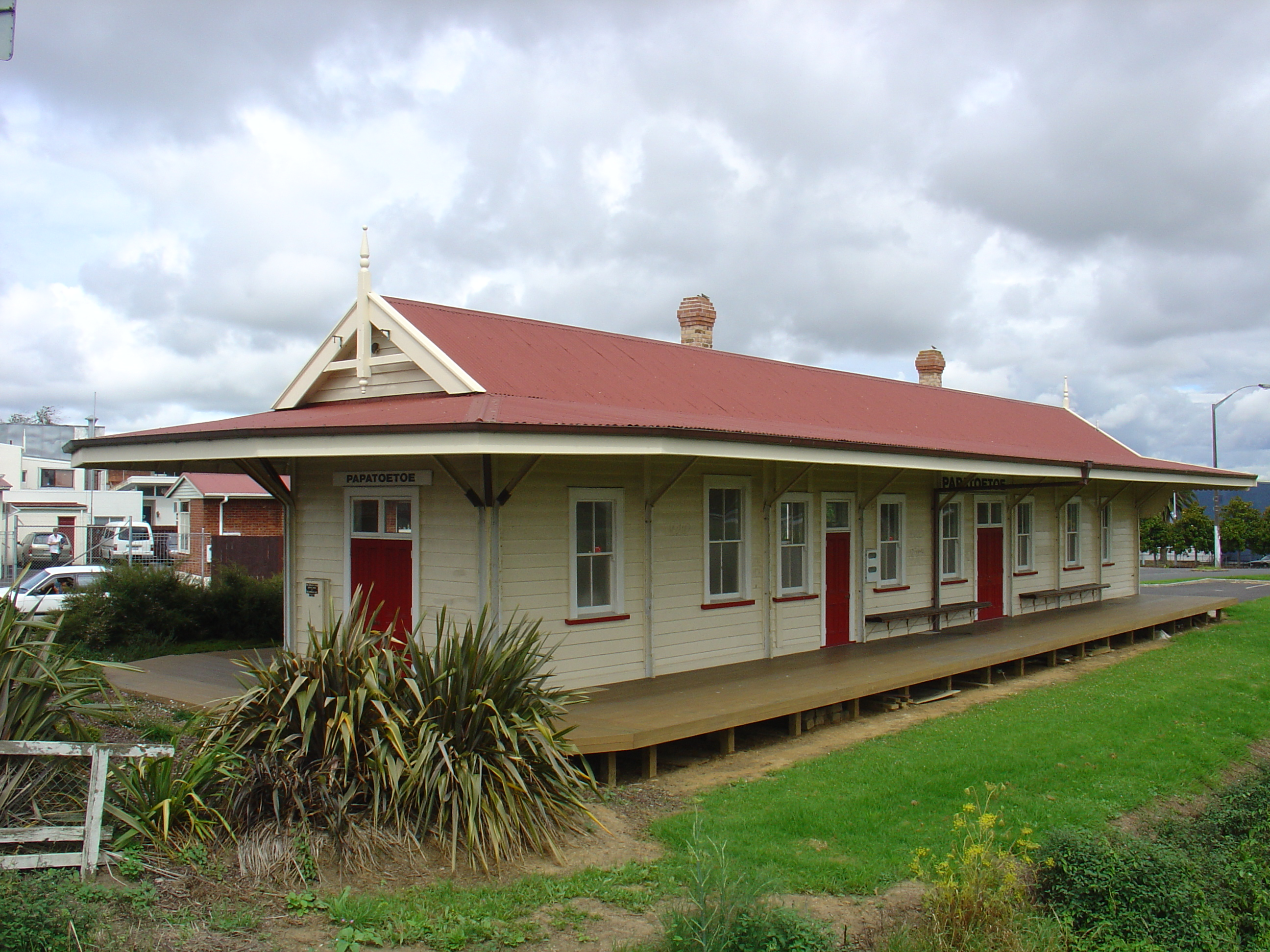
Papatoetoe's Old Railway Station – a local landmark.

- Murals in Old Papatoetoe

- "Picnic Scene" by Ron van Dam (near Wallace Road corner)
- "Papatoetoe General Store" by Christine Trout (Papatoetoe Mall)
- "Bottle O" by Christine Trout (Papatoetoe Mall)
- "Cameos" by Claudia Pond-Eyley (near Town Hall)
- "Old Papatoetoe Logo" by Ron van Dam (near Shirley Road)
- "St George St – 1930" by Merv Appleton (Rangitoto Road)

- Historical cemeteries at Manukau Memorial Gardens and St John's Presbyterian Church.
- Historic landmarks including

- Old Railway Station
- Cambria House and associated historic gardens (Puhinui Road)
- Old Children's home (now in Wyllie Road)

== Bibliography ==
- Mackintosh, Lucy (2021). Shifting Grounds: Deep Histories of Tāmaki Makaurau Auckland. Bridget Williams Books. doi:10.7810/9781988587332. ISBN 978-1-988587-33-2.
- Wichman, Gwen (1990). Soaring Bird: a History of Manurewa to 1965. Manurewa: Manurewa Historical Society. ISBN 0-473-07114-2.
- Kalous, Milan (1984). A small city in New Zealand. Manukau Public Library: Papatoetoe City Council.
