= Aongatete River =

Coordinates: 37.602085°S 175.961079°E

Location
- Country: New Zealand

Physical characteristics
- Source
  - location: Kaimai Ranges
- Mouth
  - location: Tauranga Harbour
- Length: 12 km (7.5 mi)

The Aongatete River or Aongatete Stream is a river of New Zealand. It flows northwest from the Kaimai Ranges to enter Tauranga Harbour to the south of Katikati.

== See also ==
- List of rivers of New Zealand
