= Bay of Plenty =

Bay of New Zealand

- Te Moana-a-Toitehuatahi (Māori)
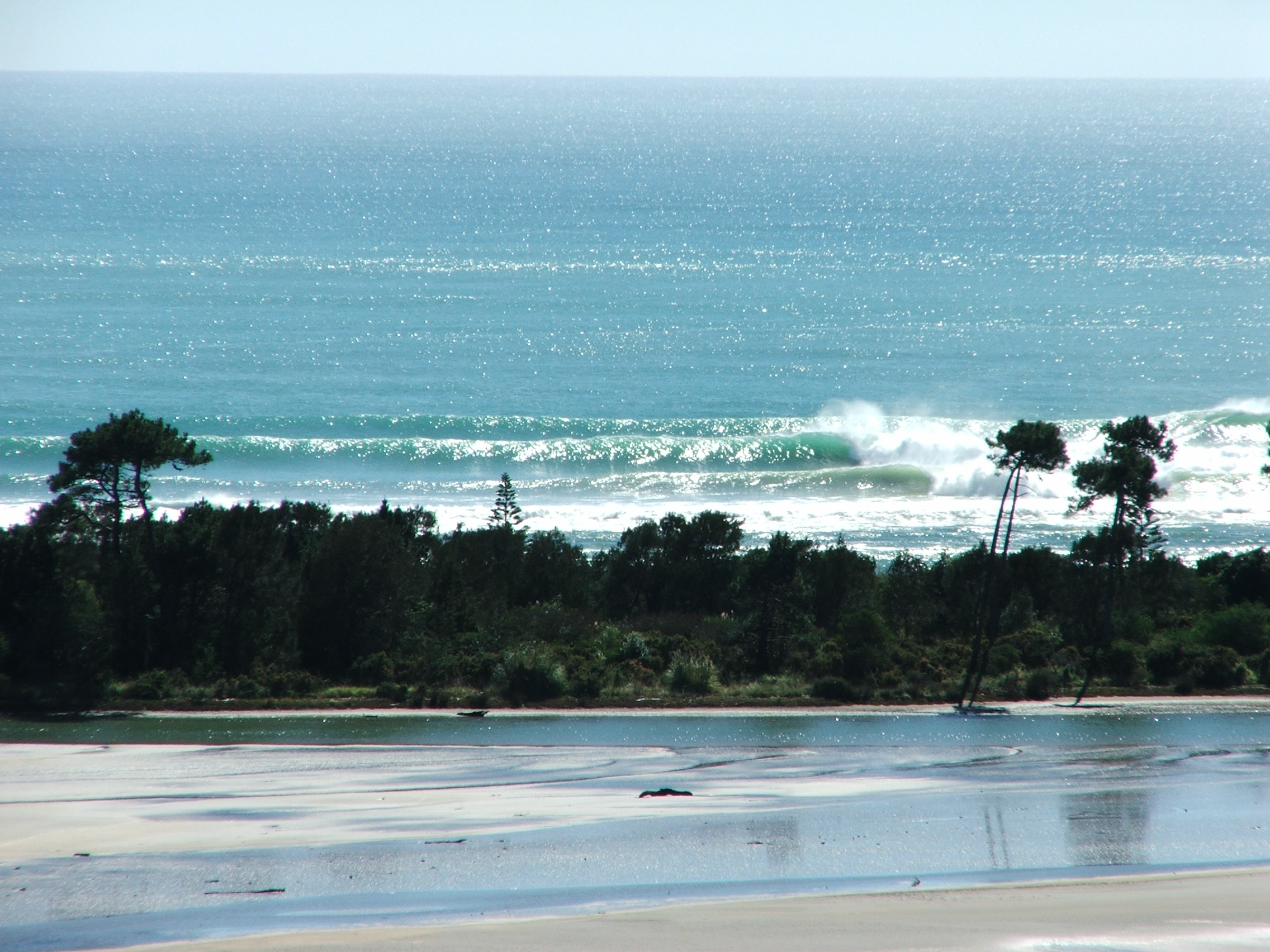
- The Bay of Plenty seen from Whakatāne. The Whakatāne River (foreground) is one of eight major rivers that empty into the bay.
- Coordinates: 37°40′S 177°00′E
- Etymology: Named by James Cook for an abundance of resources; Māori name in honour of Toi-te-huatahi
- River sources: Raukokore River, Kereu River, Haparapara River, Motu River, Hawai River, Waioeka River, Waiotahe River, Whakatāne River, Rangitaiki River, Tarawera River, Kaituna River, Wairoa River, Wainui River, Aongatete River, Otahu River, Wentworth River, Wharekawa River
- Ocean/sea sources: Pacific Ocean
- Basin countries: New Zealand
- Islands: Mayor Island / Tūhua, Mōtītī Island, Motunau / Plate Island, Moutohora Island, Te Paepae o Aotea, Whakaari / White Island
- Sections/sub-basins: Whangamatā Harbour, Tauranga Harbour, Ōhiwa Harbour
- Settlements: Whangamatā, Waihi Beach, Tauranga, Whakatāne, Ōpōtiki

The Bay of Plenty (Māori: Te Moana-a-Toitehuatahi) is a large bight along the northern coast of New Zealand's North Island. It stretches 260 kilometres (160 mi) from the Coromandel Peninsula in the west to Cape Runaway in the east. Called Te Moana-a-Toitehuatahi (the Ocean of Toitehuatahi) in the Māori language after Toi-te-huatahi, an early ancestor, the name 'Bay of Plenty' was bestowed by James Cook in 1769 when he noticed the abundant food supplies at several Māori villages there, in stark contrast to observations he had made earlier in Poverty Bay.

== Geography ==
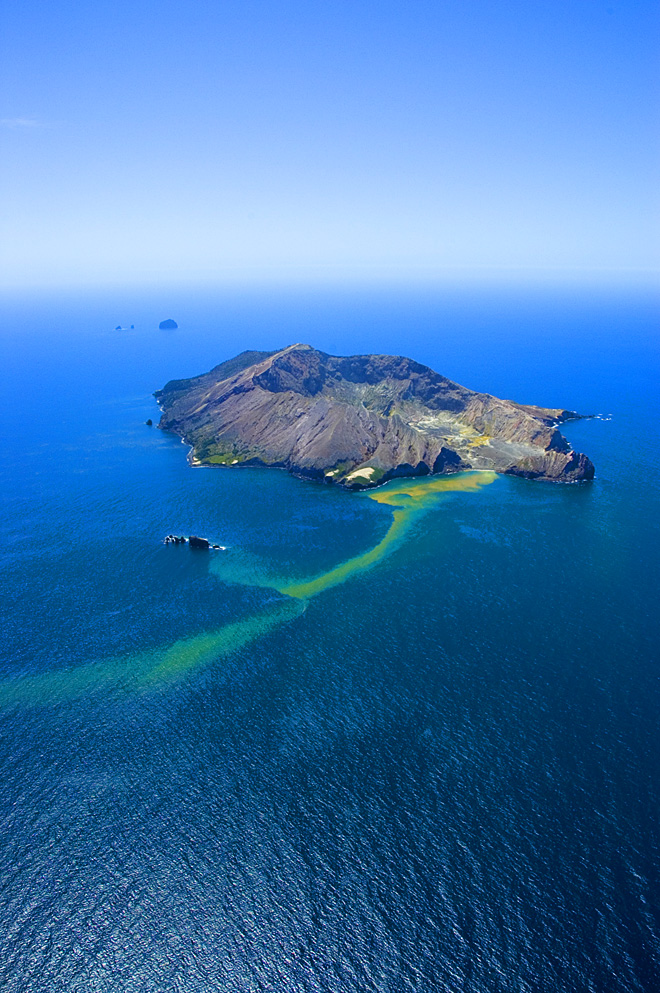
Whakaari / White Island and Te Paepae o Aotea

The bay is defined by 259 kilometres (161 mi) of open coastline used for economic, recreational and cultural purposes. The coastline from Waihi Beach in the west to Opape is defined as sandy coast, while the coast from Opape to Cape Runaway is rocky shore. Sizeable harbours are located at Tauranga, Whakatāne and Ohiwa. Major estuaries include Maketu, Little Waihi, Whakatāne, Waiotahe and Waioeka/Ōtara. Eight major rivers empty into the bay from inland catchments, including the Wairoa, Kaituna, Tarawera, Rangitaiki, Whakatāne, Waioeka, Mōtū and Raukokore rivers.

The bay contains numerous islands, notably the active andesite stratovolcano Whakaari / White Island. Whakaari is New Zealand's most active cone volcano, and has been built up by continuous volcanic activity over the past 150,000 years. The nearest mainland towns are Whakatāne and Tauranga. The island has been in a nearly continuous stage of releasing volcanic gas at least since it was sighted by James Cook in 1769. Whakaari erupted continually from December 1975 until September 2000, marking the world's longest historic eruption episode, according to GeoNet, as well as in 2012, 2016, and 2019. The latter of these resulted in 22 deaths and 25 serious injuries, primarily of tourists from a nearby cruise ship who were exploring the island at the time.

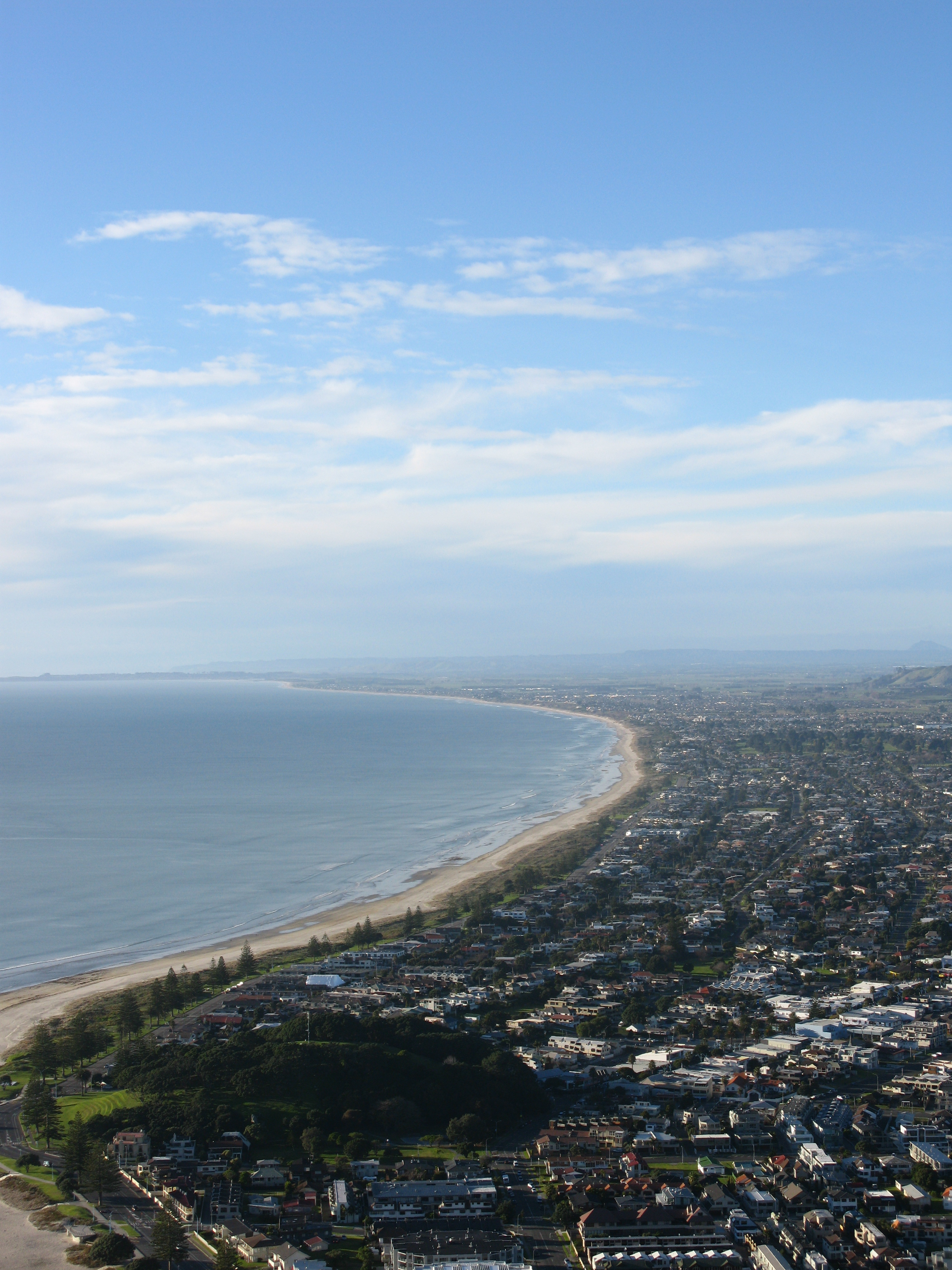
Bay of Plenty at Maunganui

Whakaari / White Island is roughly circular, about 2 km (1.2 mi) in diameter, and rises to a height of 321 m (1,053 ft) above sea level. It covers an area of approximately 325 ha (800 acres). The exposed island is only the peak of a much larger submarine volcano, which rises up to 1,600 m (5,249 ft) above the nearby seafloor. Sulphur was mined on the island until the 1930s. Ten miners were killed in 1914 when part of the crater wall collapsed.

=== Climate ===
The Bay of Plenty has a temperate, maritime climate, with warm, humid summers and mild winters.

== History ==
According to local Māori traditions, the Bay of Plenty was the landing point of several migration canoes that brought Māori settlers to New Zealand. These include the Mātaatua, Nukutere, Tākitimu, Arawa and Tainui canoes. Many of the descendant iwi maintain their traditional homelands (rohe) in the region, including Te Whānau-ā-Apanui, Te Whakatōhea, Ngāi Tai, Ngāi Tūhoe, Ngāti Awa, Ngāti Tūwharetoa ki Kawerau, Te Arawa, Ngāi Te Rangi, Ngāti Ranginui and Ngāti Pūkenga. Māori named the bay Te Moana-a-Toitehuatahi (the Ocean of Toitehuatahi), or Te Moana-a-Toi for short, after Toi-te-huatahi, an early ancestor of the Mātaatua tribes. Early Māori settlement also gave rise to many of the town and city names used today.

The first recorded European contact came when James Cook sailed through the Bay of Plenty in 1769. Cook noted the abundance of food supplies, in comparison to Poverty Bay further back along the eastern coast of the North Island. Further reports of European contact are scarce prior to the arrival of missionary Samuel Marsden to the Tauranga area in 1814. Bay whaling stations operated in the bay during the 19th century.

During the 1820s and 1830s, northern iwi including Ngā Puhi invaded the Bay of Plenty during their campaign throughout the North Island, fighting local Māori tribes in what became known as the Musket Wars. However, the 1830s and 1840s saw increased contact between Bay of Plenty Māori and Europeans through trade, although few Europeans settled in the region. Missionary activity in the region also increased during this time. In 1853, New Zealand was subdivided into provinces, with the Bay of Plenty incorporated into Auckland Province.

Conflict returned to the Bay of Plenty during the 1860s with the New Zealand Wars. Initially this stemmed from Tauranga iwi supporting the Waikato iwi in their conflict with the government. In retaliation, British Crown and government-allied Māori forces attacked the Tauranga iwi, including at the famous Battle of Gate Pā in 1864. Further conflict with the government arose in 1865 when German missionary Carl Völkner and interpreter James Fulloon were killed by local Māori at Ōpōtiki and Whakatāne, respectively. The ensuing conflict resulted in the confiscation of considerable land from several Bay of Plenty iwi by the government.

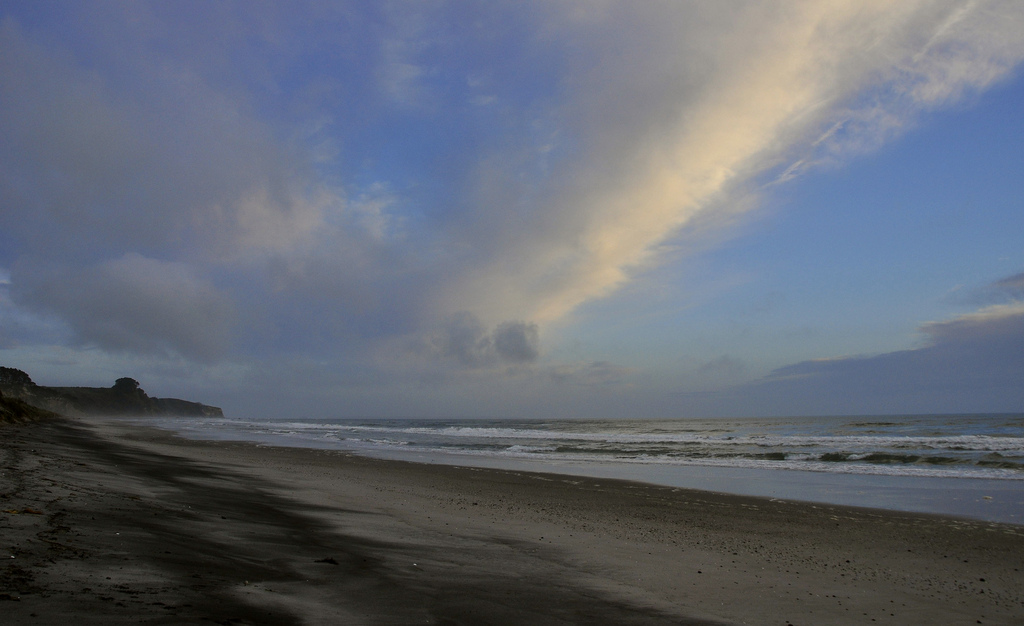
Pukehina Beach

Confiscation of Māori land deprived local iwi of economic resources (among other things), and also provided land for expanding European settlement. The government established fortified positions, including at Tauranga, Whakatāne and Ōpōtiki. European settlers arrived throughout the latter half of the 19th century, establishing settlements in Katikati, Te Puke and the Rangitaiki area. In 1876, settlements were incorporated into counties following the nationwide dissolution of the provincial system. Initial settlements in the region struggled: the climate was ill-suited to sheep farming and the geography was inaccessible, further hindered by a lack of infrastructure. By the end of the century the population had started to dwindle. But after experimenting with different crops, settlers found success with dairy production. Dairy factories sprang up across the Bay of Plenty in the 1900s, with butter and cheese feeding economic prosperity throughout the early 20th century; local Māori continued to live on the fringe of this prosperity. Timber also became a major export in the 1950s, as kiwifruit did later.

On 5 October 2011, the MV Rena ran aground on the Astrolabe Reef in the bay causing a large oil spill, described as New Zealand's worst ever environmental disaster.

A volcanic eruption occurred on Whakaari / White Island at 14:11 on 9 December 2019, which resulted in twenty fatalities and twenty-seven injuries, most suffering severe burns. Forty-seven people were reportedly on the island when it erupted. A second eruption closely followed the first.

== See also ==
- List of schools in the Bay of Plenty Region
