= Ōtara River =

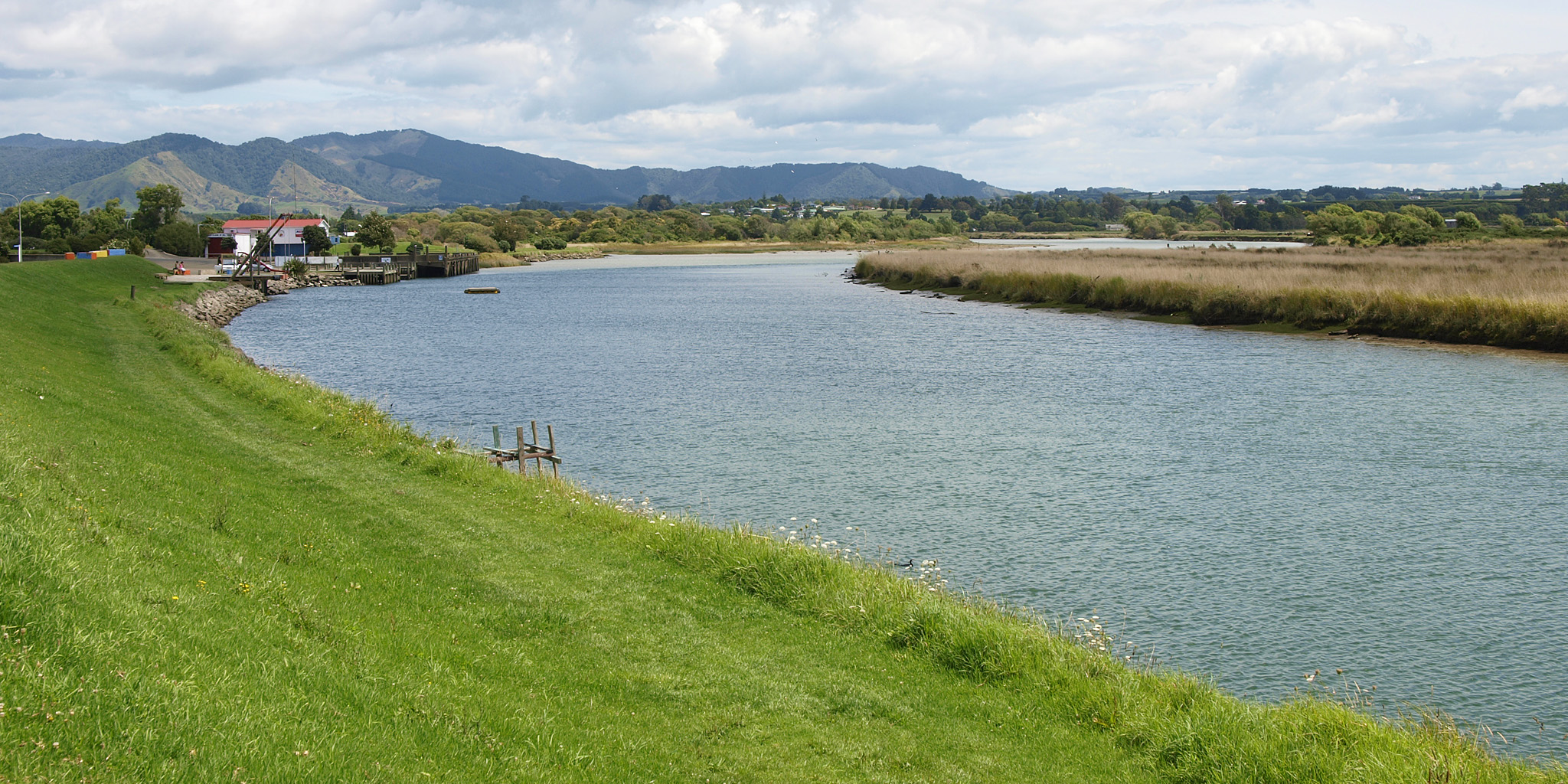
- The Ōtara River at Ōpōtiki, Bay of Plenty, New Zealand.
- Route of the Ōtara River
- Mouth of the Ōtara River Ōtara River (North Island)

Location
- Country: New Zealand

Physical characteristics
- Source: Confluence of the Mangakakaho Stream and Pakihi Stream
  - coordinates: 38°06′17″S 177°24′02″E
- Mouth
  - location: Pakihikura Harbour
  - coordinates: 38°00′05″S 177°16′54″E
  - elevation: 0 m (0 ft)
- Length: 35 kilometres (22 mi)

Basin features
- Progression: Waiaua River → Pakihikura Harbour → Bay of Plenty → Pacific Ocean
- Tributaries
  - left: Te Waiti Stream, Tutaetoko Stream
- Bridges: Ōtara River Bridge

The Ōtara River is found in the north of New Zealand's North Island. It flows north for 35 kilometres (22 mi), reaching the sea at Ōpōtiki in the eastern Bay of Plenty. It shares its estuary with the Waioeka River.
