= Papatoetoe Intermediate School =

Papatoetoe Intermediate

Location
- 175 Motatau Road, Papatoetoe, Auckland; New Zealand; 36.9617°S 174.8554°E

Information
- Type: State co-ed intermediate (Year 7–8)
- Motto: Whaka pokai tara (Lead, as Tara led)
- Established: 1953
- Ministry of Education Institution no.: 1428
- Principal: Ms Pauline Cornwell
- Enrolment: 722 (July 2026)
- Socio-economic decile: 2
- Website: papint.school.nz

Papatoetoe Intermediate School is an intermediate school (years 7–8) in Papatoetoe, a suburb of Manukau Ward, Auckland Region, New Zealand.

== History ==
The school opened in 1953 on a site adjacent to Dominion Breweries on Great South Road in Papatoetoe. The school was intended to be named Middlemore Intermediate, but changed to Otara Intermediate when the school opened in February 1953. The 650 pupils enrolled at that time came from both Papatoetoe and the surrounding district. The school comprised a double storey block of 16 classrooms and several specialist rooms, including a library. The headmaster was Mr R.A. Robbie. A school committee and a home and school association were formed.

In 1958, a school named Papatoetoe Intermediate was opened on Portage Road, which later changed its name to Kedgley Intermediate in 1967, after principal Maurice Kedgley died in office. Otara Intermediate changed its name to Papatoetoe Intermediate School in the following year, to avoid confusion with the suburb of Ōtara taking shape a kilometre or so to the east.
