= Mount Saint John (New Zealand) =

Scoria cone in Auckland, New Zealand

Te Kōpuke / Mount Saint John
- Tītīkōpuke
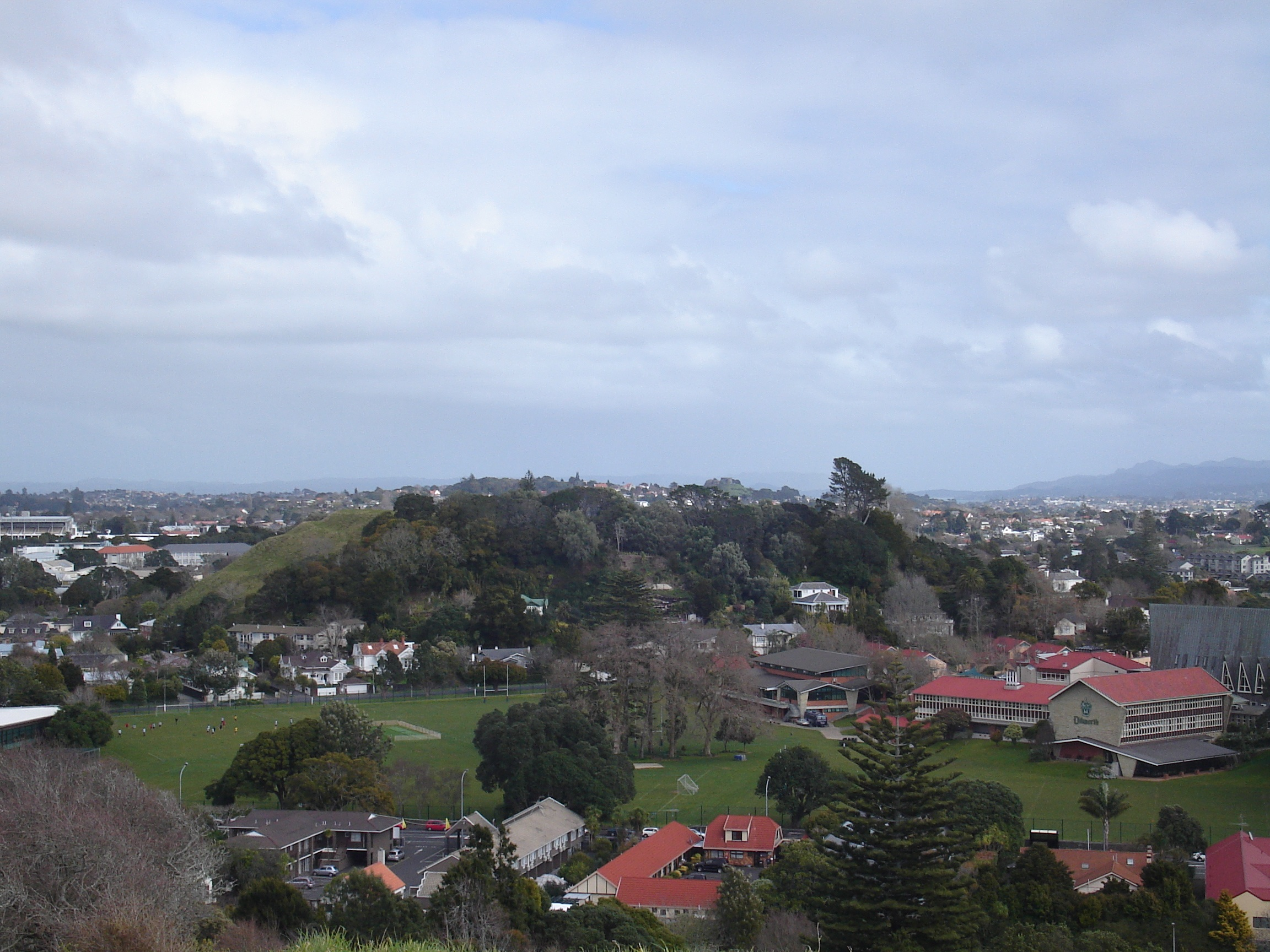
- Te Kōpuke / Mount Saint John as seen from Ōhinerau / Mount Hobson.

Highest point
- Coordinates: 36.883431°S 174.780196°E

Naming
- Native name: Te Kōpuke (Māori); Tītīkōpuke (Māori)

Geography
- Location: North Island, New Zealand

Geology
- Rock age: 28,500

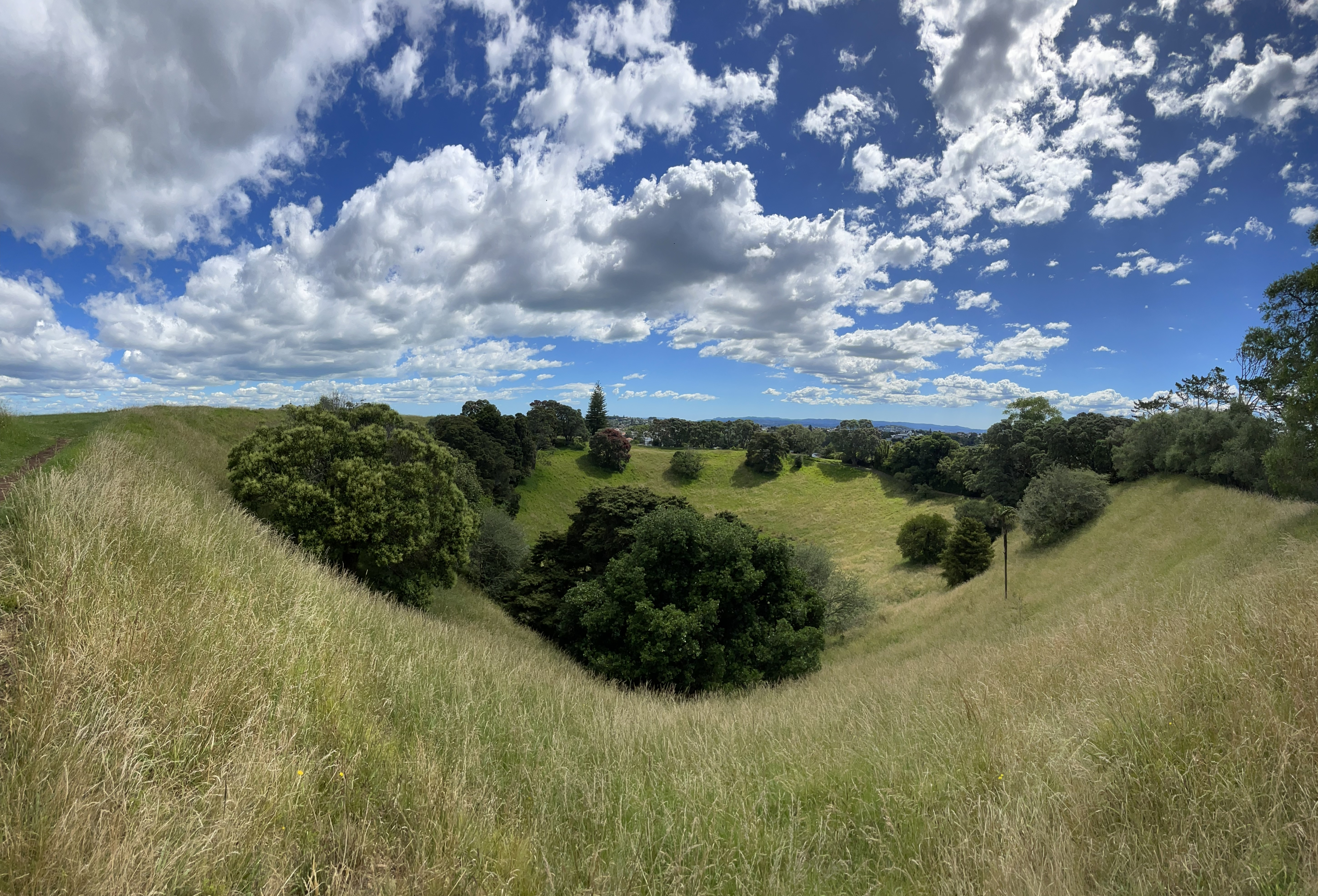
The crater of Te Kōpuke / Mount Saint John.

Mount Saint John (Māori: Te Kōpuke or Tītīkōpuke), is a volcanic scoria cone and Tūpuna Maunga (ancestral mountain) in Epsom, in the Auckland volcanic field of New Zealand.

== Geography and geology ==
It has a peak 126 metres above sea level and a crater around 125 m wide and 20 m deep. The age of Mount St John is currently unknown but is older than 28,500 years old as the scoria cone is mantled in ash from Te Tatua-a-Riukiuta volcano.

Mount St John is now known to be the source of the long lava flow that ran west down an old stream valley and out into the Waitematā Harbour as Meola Reef. Maungawhau / Mount Eden later erupted through the lava flow.

== History ==
Te Kōpuke means 'the prominent mound' and is an abbreviation of Tītīkōpuke. Mount Saint John was named after Colonel J. H. H. St John, who was prominent in the New Zealand Wars. None of its three names are official. In 2014, the Tāmaki Collective agreed that both Te Kōpuke and Tītīkōpuke reflect the historical association of local Māori with this site. The maunga is a place of great cultural and archaeological significance, and was the site of a pā, and has retained Māori earthworks from that era such as kumara pits and terracing for housing.

During World War II, an anti-aircraft artillery was built on Mount Saint John, in order to protect the city of Auckland. In 1957, a water reservoir was constructed on the peak, buried underneath the eastern rim of the crater.

In the 2014 Treaty of Waitangi settlement between the Crown and the Ngā Mana Whenua o Tāmaki Makaurau collective of 13 Auckland iwi and hapū (also known as the Tāmaki Collective), ownership of the 14 Tūpuna Maunga of Auckland, was vested to the collective. The legislation specified that the land be held in trust "for the common benefit of Ngā Mana Whenua o Tāmaki Makaurau and the other people of Auckland". The Tūpuna Maunga o Tāmaki Makaurau Authority or Tūpuna Maunga Authority (TMA) is the co-governance organisation established to administer the 14 Tūpuna Maunga. Auckland Council manages the Tūpuna Maunga under the direction of the TMA.
