= Rakataura =

Tohunga of the Tainui canoe

Rakataura, also known as Hape or Rakatāura, is a legendary Polynesian navigator and a progenitor of many Māori iwi. Born in Hawaiki, Rakataura was the senior tohunga (priest/navigator) who led the Tainui migratory canoe to New Zealand. Rakataura is associated with stories involving the Manukau Harbour, the Te Tō Waka (the Ōtāhuhu Portage) and the Waikato. Many place names in Tāmaki Makaurau (modern-day Auckland) and the Waikato region reference Rakataura, or are described in oral traditions as being named by Rakataura.

== Oral history ==
Rakataura was born in Hawaiki, and was the eldest member of the senior line of his hapū. He received the name Hape, due to his inward-turning feet. Rakataura was the senior tohunga (priest/navigator) of the Tainui migratory waka, and in some traditions, is identified as the shipbuilder of the vessel.

In Waiohua oral tradition, Rakataura / Hape travels supernaturally to New Zealand, ahead of the Tainui crew. In this version, Rakataura was chosen to represent his hapū on the Tainui canoe, however this was not popular due to his disability, and only the young and those with sound bodies and minds could travel. Rakataura prayed to Tangaroa for his feet to be restored, however instead of healing his body, Tangaroa sent Kawea Kawea Ki te Whenua a Kupe, a taniwha (supernatural being) in the shape of a stingray to transport him. Rakataura arrived at the Manukau Harbour, waiting at Ihumātao for the Tainui crew to arrive. Days later, the crew arrived, not from the mouth of the harbour, instead from the east (having crossed the Te Tō Waka at Ōtāhuhu over the Auckland isthmus). Rakataura called out from the hill, hence the name Karangahape ("The Call of Hape"). Another supernatural tradition involves Rakataura beating the Tainui crew to reach the Kawhia Harbour by leaping underground between the Māhia Peninsula and Kawhia.

In Te Kawerau ā Maki oral tradition, Rakataura travelled to the Waitākere Ranges, bestowing names to the locations he visited. Some of these names include Hikurangi, the name he gave to a location near Piha which referenced a location in his homeland and became one of the traditional names for West Auckland and the Waitākere Ranges, and One Rangatira, the traditional name for Muriwai Beach, a name which commemorated his visit.

Other traditions link Rakataura to the Ōtāhuhu Portage between the Tāmaki River and the Manukau Harbour. In some traditions, he is the tohunga who creates the portage, while in others he attempts to block the Tainui crew from using it and settling to the west. In these traditions, Rakataura quarrels with Hoturoa, captain of the Tainui, because he refused to let Rakataura marry his daughter Kahukeke. Instead of crossing the portage, Hoturoa and the crew of the Tainui sail around the entire Northland Peninsula to the Manukau Harbour. Rakataura and his sister Hiaroa lit fires and sung incantations to prevent the main Tainui crew from settling around the harbour or the Waikato area. Rakataura travelled south to the Whāingaroa Harbour (Raglan Harbour), establishing a tūāhupapa (sacred altar) on the mountain Karioi, and continued to sing incantations to dissuade the Tainui crew from discovering the areas he found. Rakataura travelled further south to the Kawhia Harbour, where he met the Tainui crew, reconciled (either here or further south at Whareorino), and married Kahukeke (the daughter of Hoturoa), later returning to settle at Karioi.

Rakataura is credited with exploring the forested interior of the Waikato region with his wife, naming places after the members of the Tainui crew, to establish land rights. He placed mauri stones from Hawaiki along the journey, as a way to entice birds to the areas he visited. During their travels, Kahukeke fell ill at Wharepūhunga, where Rakataura built a house for her to rest in and recover. Kahukeke fell ill a second time at Pureora, however did not survive. After she dies, Rakataura names Kakepuku after the shape of his wife when she was pregnant, and the area where he eventually settled, Te Aroha, after the love he felt for his wife. There, he married again, to a woman named Hinemarino.

Some traditions describe Rakataura as settling at Rarotonga / Mount Smart in Tāmaki Makaurau with his wife, before travelling to the Waikato later in life.

== Legacy ==
Rakataura / Hape is the namesake of Karangahape Peninsula and Karangahape Road in Auckland, and some of the Māori language names for Ōwairaka / Mount Albert, Te Ahi-kā-a-Rakataura ("The Continuous Fires of Rakataura") and Te Wai o Raka ("The Waters of Raka"). Te Motu a Hiaroa (Puketutu Island), one of the first permanent settlements of the Tainui people, is named after Rakataura's sister Hiaroa. Rakataura is cited in oral traditions as the figure who named many areas of the Waikato, including the Whāingaroa Harbour), Karioi, Maungatautari, Whakamaru, Pureora and Te Aroha.

The officially designated name for Mount Maunganui in the early 20th century was Rakataura, named after the tohunga by Bay of Plenty settler J. C. Adams, however this name never came into popular use.

Rakataura is considered one of the ancestors of Tainui (including Ngāti Maniapoto and Ngāti Raukawa), historical Auckland iwi Ngā Oho, Te Kawerau ā Maki, and Waiohua tribes.

== See also ==
- Tainui (canoe)
