= Tūpuna Maunga o Tāmaki Makaurau =

Mountains in Auckland, New Zealand

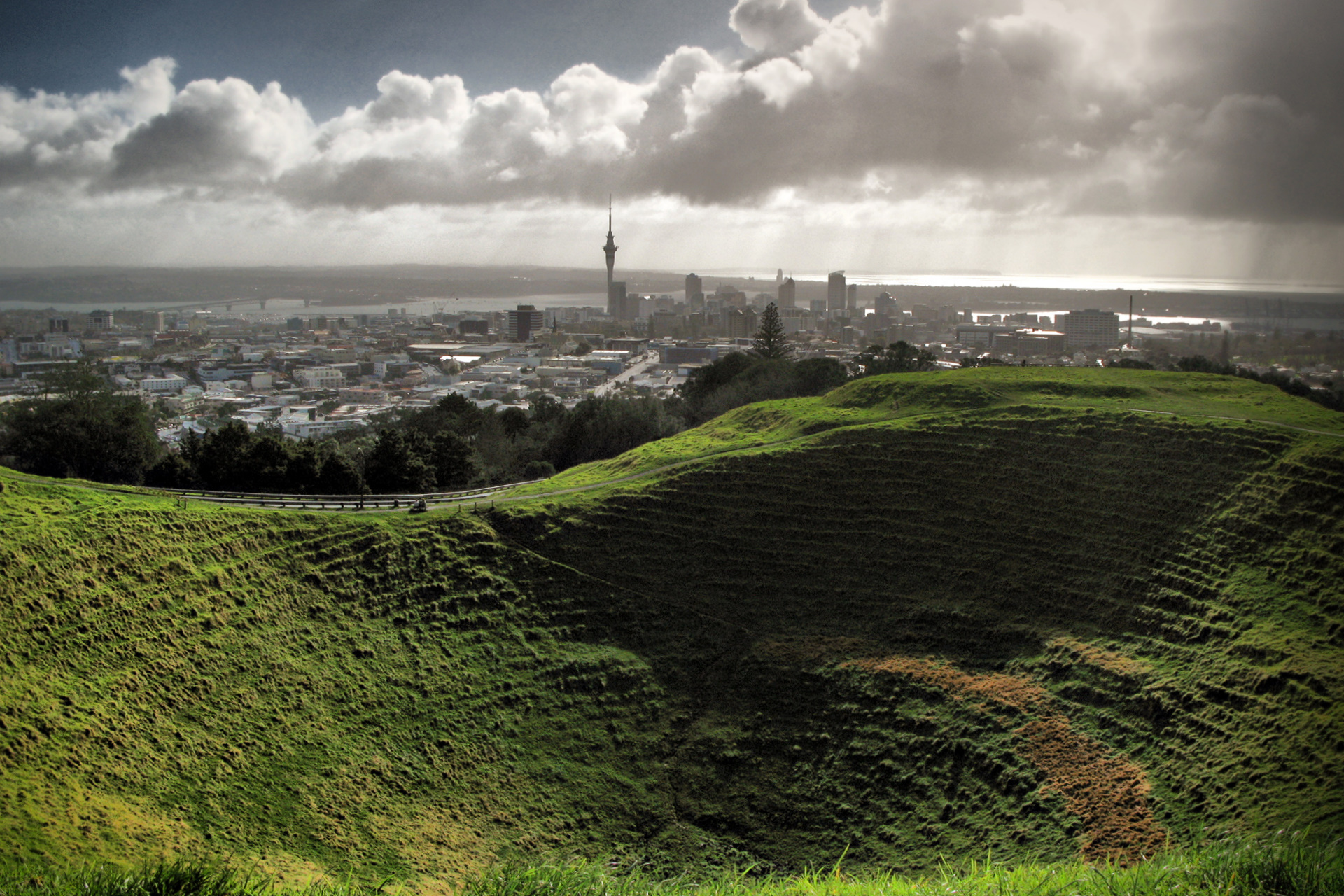
Looking into and over the crater of Maungawhau / Mount Eden

Interactive map showing the locations of the 14 Tūpuna Maunga

The Tūpuna Maunga o Tāmaki Makaurau (ancestral mountains of Auckland) are 14 volcanic cones that hold great historical, spiritual, ancestral and cultural significance to the 13 Māori iwi and hapū of Ngā Mana Whenua o Tāmaki Makaurau (also known as the Tāmaki Collective), who have owned them since 2014.

== Ownership and management ==
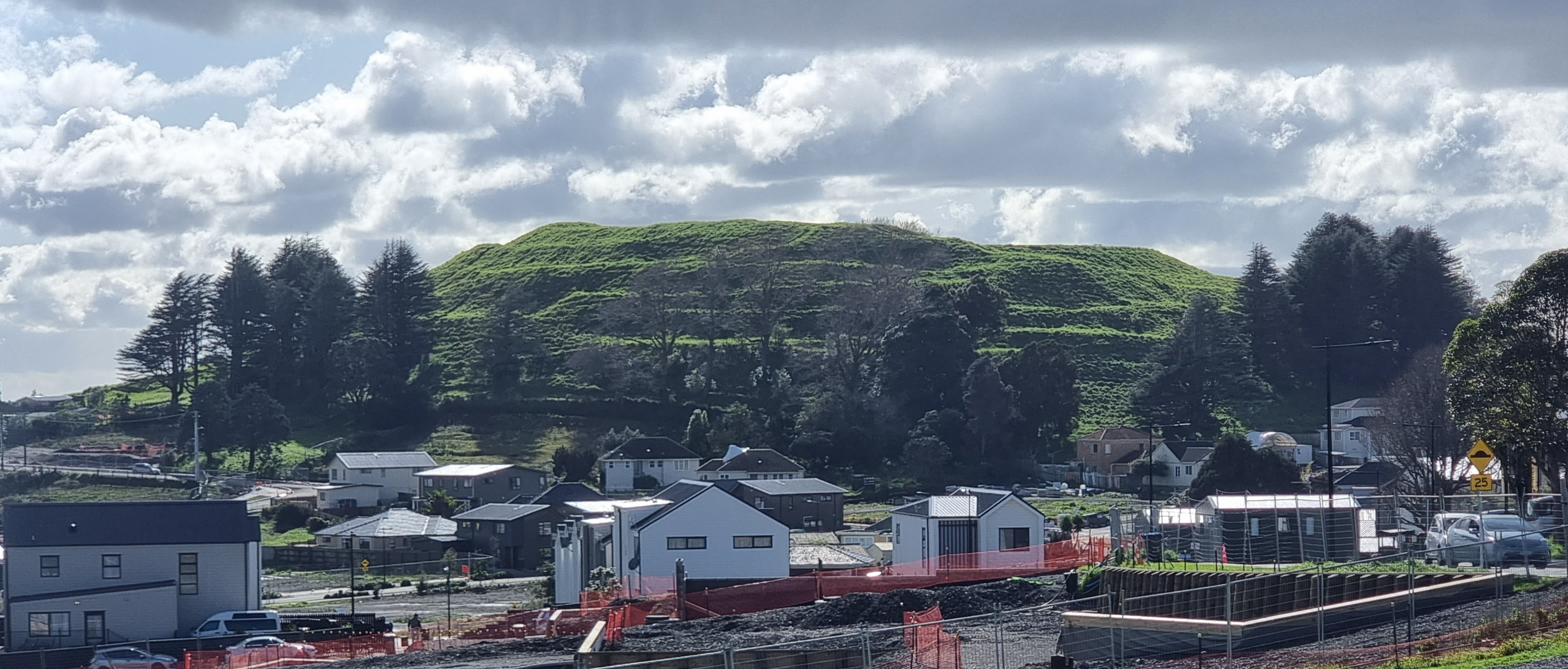
The south side of Pukewīwī / Puketāpapa / Mount Roskill, with extensive historic Māori terracing visible

In 2014, the Ngā Mana Whenua o Tāmaki Makaurau Collective Redress Deed passed into law. Through the Treaty of Waitangi settlement between the Crown and the Tāmaki Collective, ownership of the 14 Tūpuna Maunga, was vested to the collective.

The legislation specified that the land be held in trust "for the common benefit of Ngā Mana Whenua o Tāmaki Makaurau and the other people of Auckland". The Tūpuna Taonga Trust is the legal entity set up to receive the cultural redress over the maunga on behalf of the collective, with a primary focus of "enduring protection and appropriate use of the Tūpuna Maunga for generations to come".

The Tūpuna Maunga o Tāmaki Makaurau Authority, or Tūpuna Maunga Authority (TMA), is the co-governance organisation established to administer the 14 Tūpuna Maunga. The TMA is composed equally of members from the Tāmaki Collective and from Auckland Council, together with a Crown (non-voting) representative. Auckland Council manages the Tūpuna Maunga under the direction of the TMA. The Tūpuna Maunga Authority has 13 members: two each are appointed by the Marutūāhu, Ngāti Whātua and Waiohua Tāmaki rōpū; six are appointed by the Auckland Council; and a single, non-voting member is appointed by the Minister for Arts, Culture and Heritage.

In 2022, following a legal dispute over the TMA's plans to fell exotic trees on Ōwairaka / Mount Albert, the Court of Appeal found that the authority and council had acted unlawfully in not seeking public consultation. In seeking leave to appeal to the Supreme Court, TMA chairman Paul Majurey noted that it was "the first time that the courts have been able to consider the powers of a co-governance entity created through a Te Tiriti o Waitangi settlement".

=== Collective ===
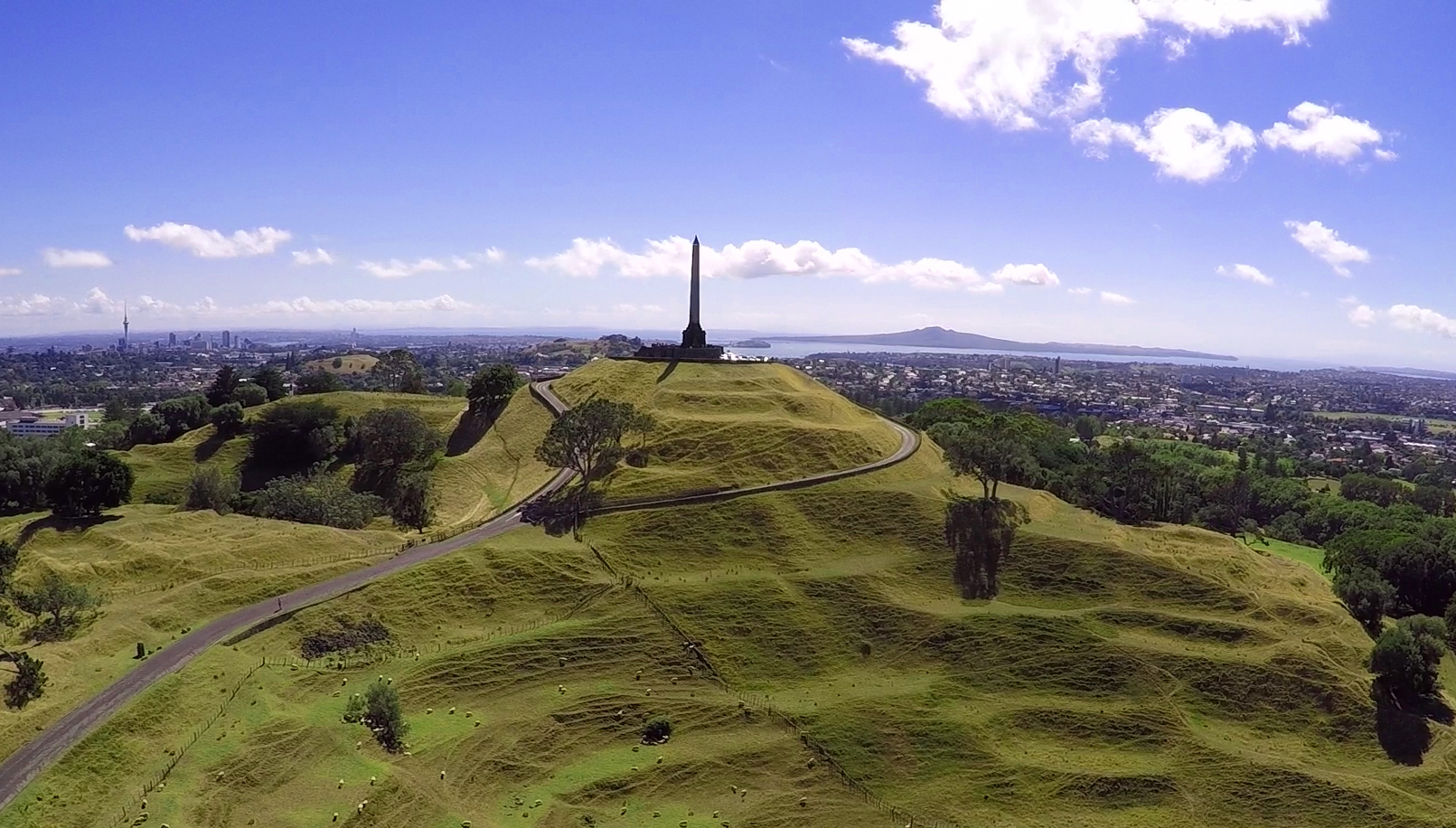
Maungakiekie / One Tree Hill, with historic Māori terracing and obelisk visible

The 13 iwi and hapū of the Tāmaki collective, by rōpū are:

- Marutūāhu Rōpū: Ngāti Maru, Ngāti Pāoa, Ngāti Tamaterā, Ngāti Whanaunga, Te Patukirikiri
- Ngāti Whātua Rōpū: Ngāti Whātua o Kaipara, Ngāti Whātua Ōrākei, Te Rūnanga o Ngāti Whātua
- Waiohua Tāmaki Rōpū: Ngāi Tai ki Tāmaki, Ngāti Tamaoho, Ngāti Te Ata, Te Ākitai Waiohua, Te Kawerau ā Maki.

== Maunga ==
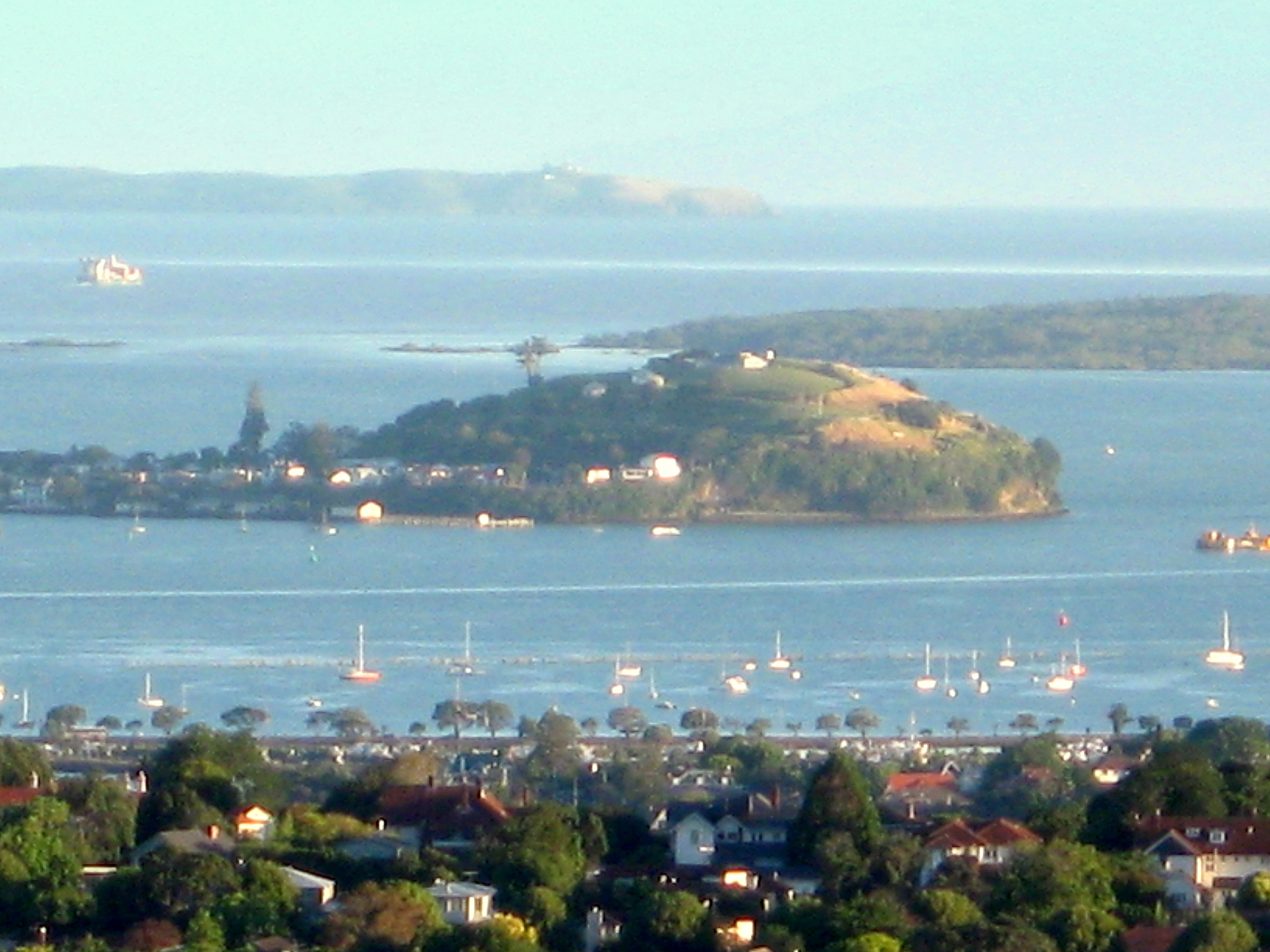
Maungauika / North Head with the flanks of Rangitoto Island and the Hauraki Gulf beyond.

The 14 Tūpuna Maunga, as referred to by Auckland Council and the TMA, are:

- Matukutūruru / Wiri Mountain
- Maungakiekie / One Tree Hill
- Maungarei / Mount Wellington
- Maungawhau / Mount Eden
- Maungauika / North Head
- Ōwairaka / Te Ahi-kā-a-Rakataura / Mount Albert
- Ōhinerau / Mount Hobson
- Ōhuiarangi / Pigeon Mountain
- Ōtāhuhu / Mount Richmond
- Pukewīwī / Puketāpapa / Mount Roskill
- Rarotonga / Mount Smart
- Te Kōpuke / Tītīkōpuke / Mount St John
- Takarunga / Mount Victoria
- Te Tātua a Riukiuta / Big King.

Māngere Mountain and the Maungakiekie / One Tree Hill northern land remains in Crown ownership, but are administered through the TMA.

=== Legal names ===
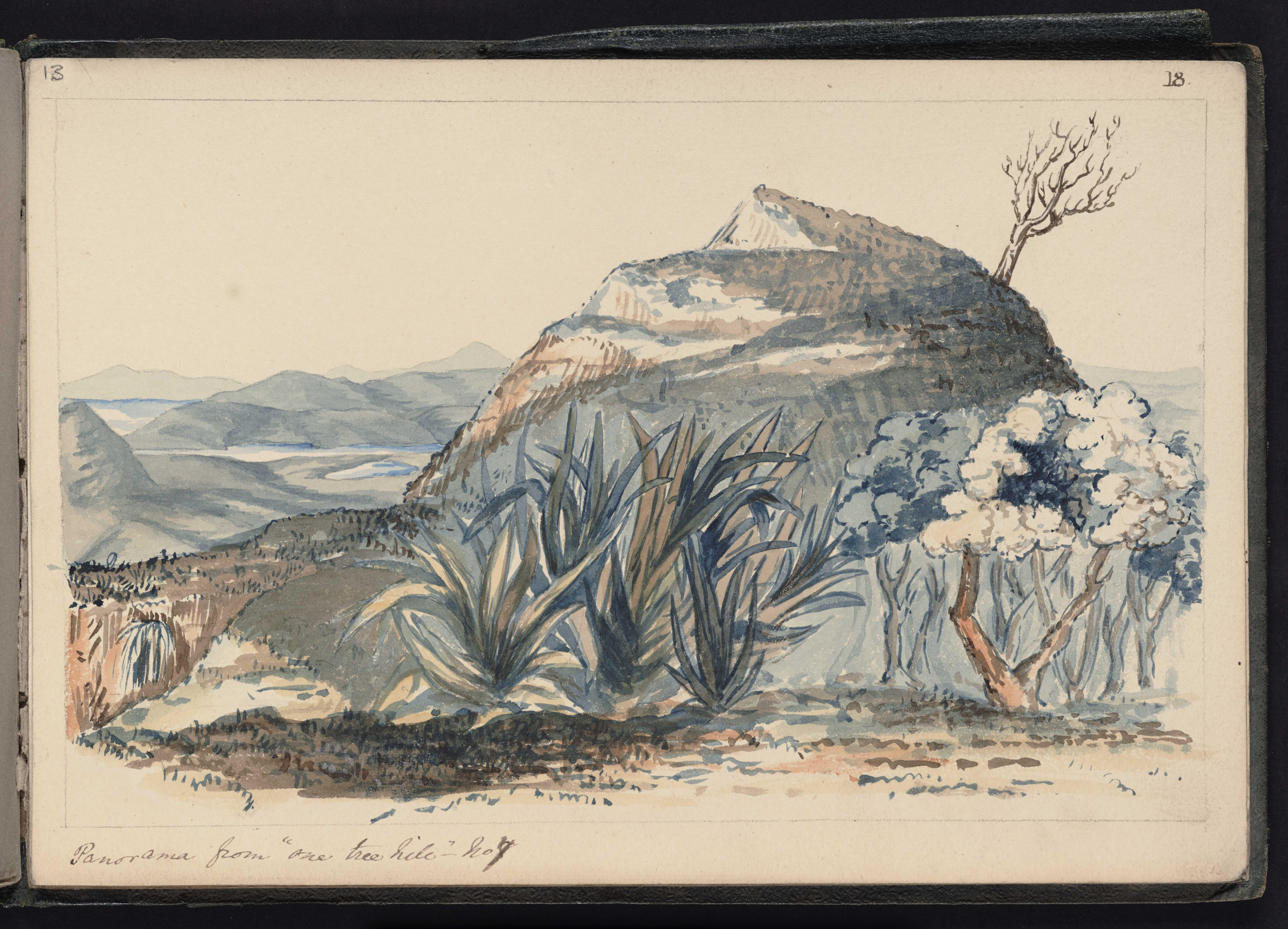
1845 watercolour the summit of Maungakiekie / One Tree Hill, with its single pōhutukawa or tōtara tree, that gave the maunga its English name.

With the passing of the 2014 Redress Act, 11 of the 14 Tūpuna Maunga were given official names.

Three are officially single Māori names:

- Matukutūruru
- Maungauika
- Te Tātua-a-Riukiuta

Eight are officially dual Māori and English names:

- Maungakiekie / One Tree Hill
- Maungarei / Mount Wellington
- Maungawhau / Mount Eden
- Ōhinerau / Mount Hobson
- Ōhuiarangi / Pigeon Mountain
- Ōtāhuhu / Mount Richmond
- Rarotonga / Mount Smart
- Takarunga / Mount Victoria

Due to difficulties resolving more than one Māori name, three of the 14 Tūpuna Maunga retained their English names in the Act, but have no official names:

- Mount Albert
- Mount Roskill
- Mount St John

== Legend and history ==
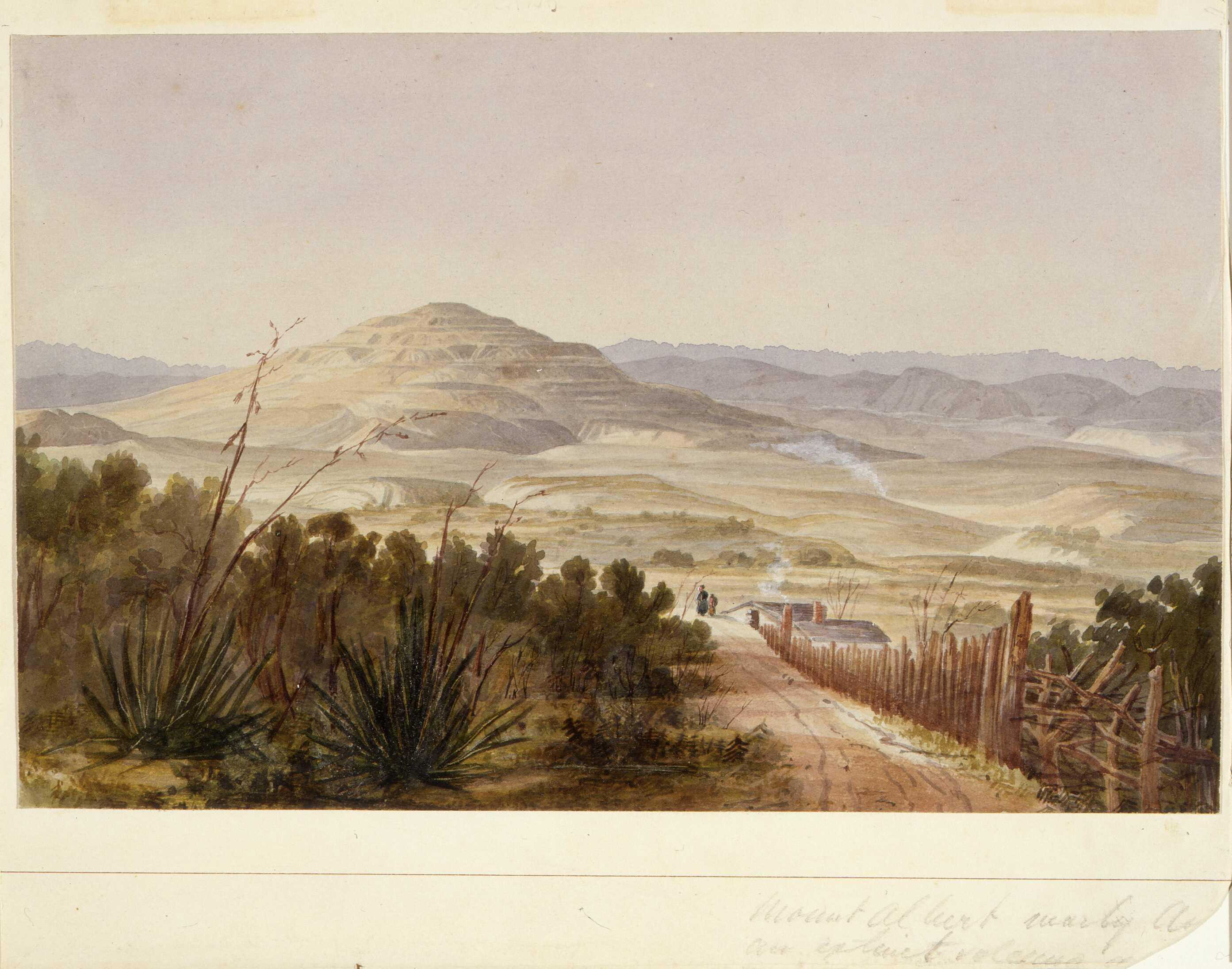
1845 watercolour of Ōwairaka / Te Ahi-kā-a-Rakataura / Mount Albert, with ridged terraces excavated by Māori for occupation and defence. Most were later destroyed by quarrying.

Tāmaki Māori pūrākau (legend) describe the creation of the Auckland volcanic field, including the Tūpuna Maunga, as a creation of Mataaho (the guardian of the earth's secrets) and his brother Rūaumoko (the god of earthquakes and volcanoes), made as a punishment against a tribe of patupaiarehe (supernatural beings) living in the Waitākere Ranges, who used deadly magic from the earth to defeat a war party of patupaiarehe from the Hunua Ranges.

For Māori, the Tūpuna Maunga were significant places used for settlement, agriculture, battles, marriages, birth and burial. Most were occupied by substantial Māori pā (fortifications) before Pākehā settlement, their slopes and summits modified by digging by hand, probably over several generations, to form terraces, ditches, banks, and pits, for living, gardening and defence. Many of these culturally and archeologically significant remnants are still visible, however post-1840, some were strongly altered through quarrying of construction materials, especially scoria. Today, they are preserved as treasured landmarks and parks.

== Usage and plans ==
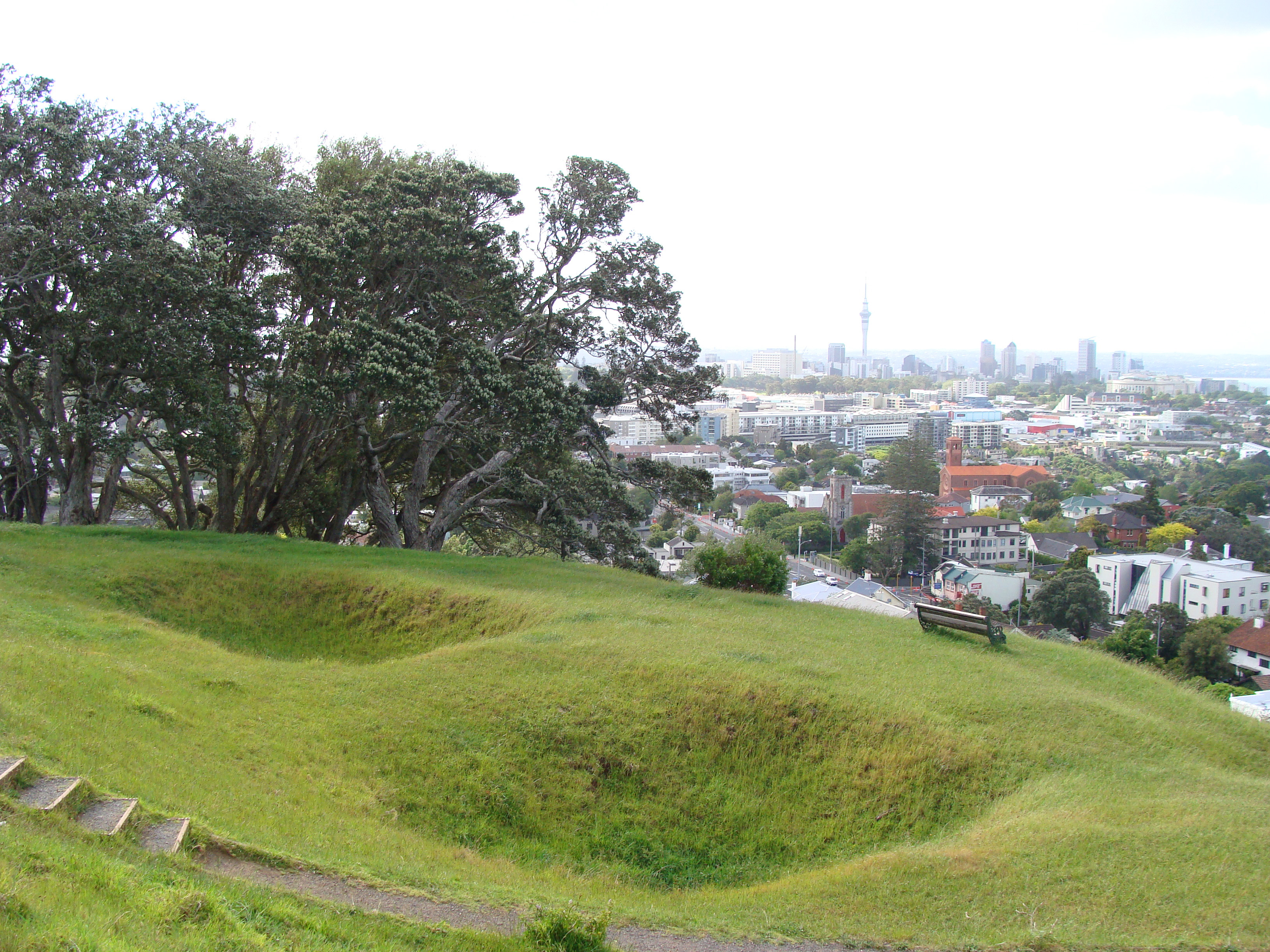
Historic kūmara pits at Ōhinerau / Mount Hobson.

The TMA's Integrated Management Plan directs the future management of the Tūpuna Maunga, produced with local government boards and communities capturing and enhancing the unique qualities of each maunga. It also lists the current activities being undertaken at each maunga. In 2022 those included:

- Cultural activities
- Commercial activities
- Residential tenancy activities
- Community groups and education activities
- Guided tours / concessions
- Sports organised groups
- Sports fields
- Tennis court
- Public car parking area
- Public vehicle access
- Public toilet facilities
- Play grounds
- Plaques / monument
- Military structures
- Trig stations
- Dogs
- Grazing
- Above ground and underground reservoirs
- Above ground wastewater pipelines and fittings

The TMA publishes an annual Tūpuna Maunga Operational Plan, as required by the Ngā Mana Whenua o Tāmaki Makaurau Collective Redress Act 2014, which outlines the work the council will undertake in the year ahead, as directed by the TMA.

== Vehicle access ==
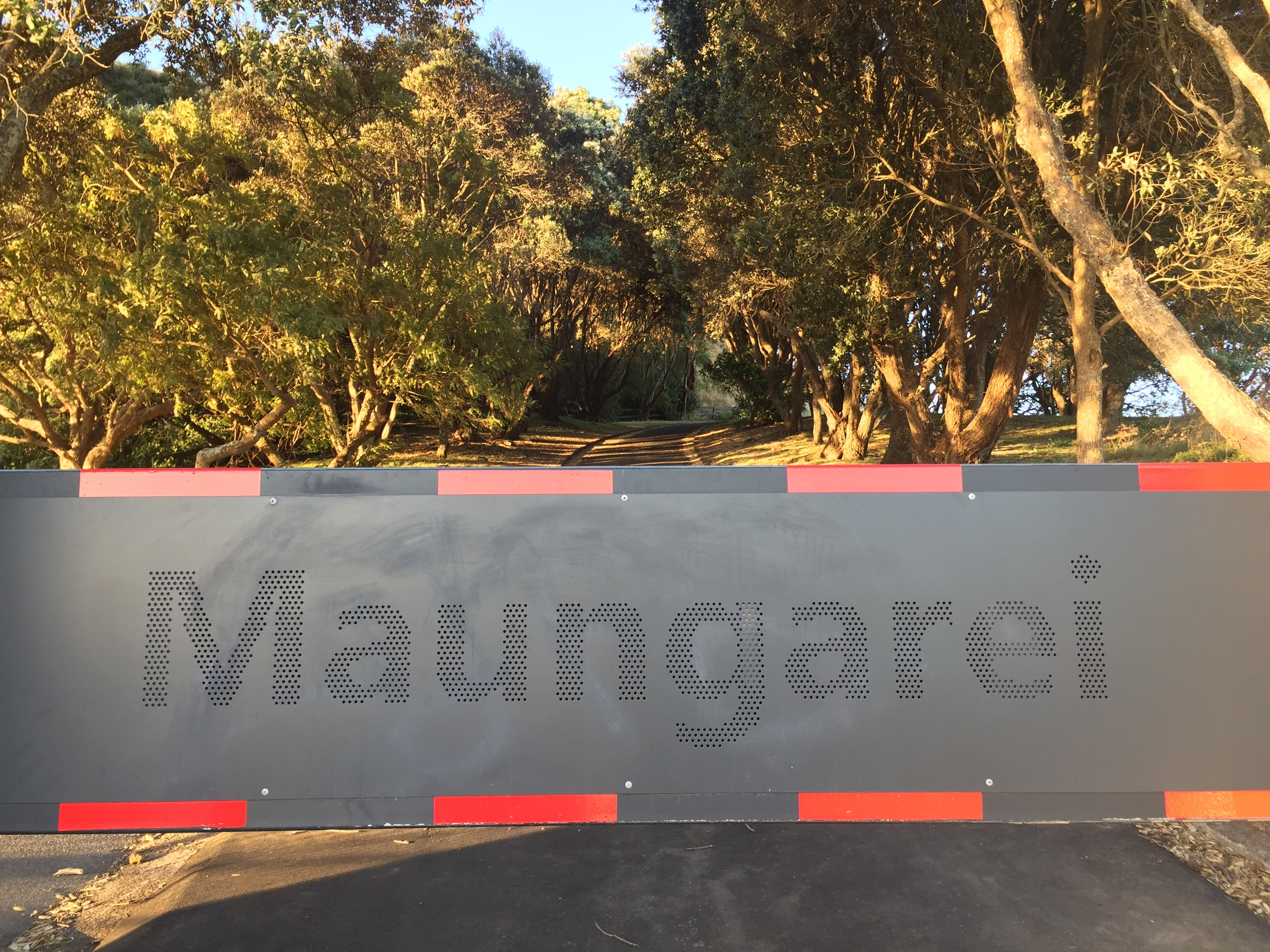
Barrier at base of access road at Maungarei / Mount Wellington.

From 2016 to 2019, due to the spiritual and cultural significance of the maunga to Māori, and for pedestrian safety, summit roads to six of the maunga were permanently closed to most motor vehicles, including motorbikes and scooters. Pedestrians, cyclists and people with limited mobility can still use the summit roads.

The six maunga whose roads were closed are:

- Maungakiekie / One Tree Hill
- Maungarei / Mt Wellington
- Maungawhau / Mt Eden
- Ōwairaka / Te Ahi-kā-a-Rakataura / Mt Albert
- Pukewīwī / Puketāpapa / Mt Roskill
- Takarunga / Mt Victoria.

== Visitor experiences ==
In 2019, the 1926 Spanish Mission-style tearoom on Maungawhau / Mount Eden was converted into Whau Cafe and the Te Ipu Kōrero o Maungawhau / Mount Eden Visitor Experience Centre. The centre showcases the geological and Māori cultural history of the maunga.

In 2020, boardwalks were opened around the Maungawhau / Mount Eden crater rim, to protect the pā tūāpapa (terraces) and rua kūmara (kūmara storage pits) on the summit's upper slopes. Views from the boardwalk into the deep crater and over Auckland city are spectacular.

== Native vegetation restoration ==
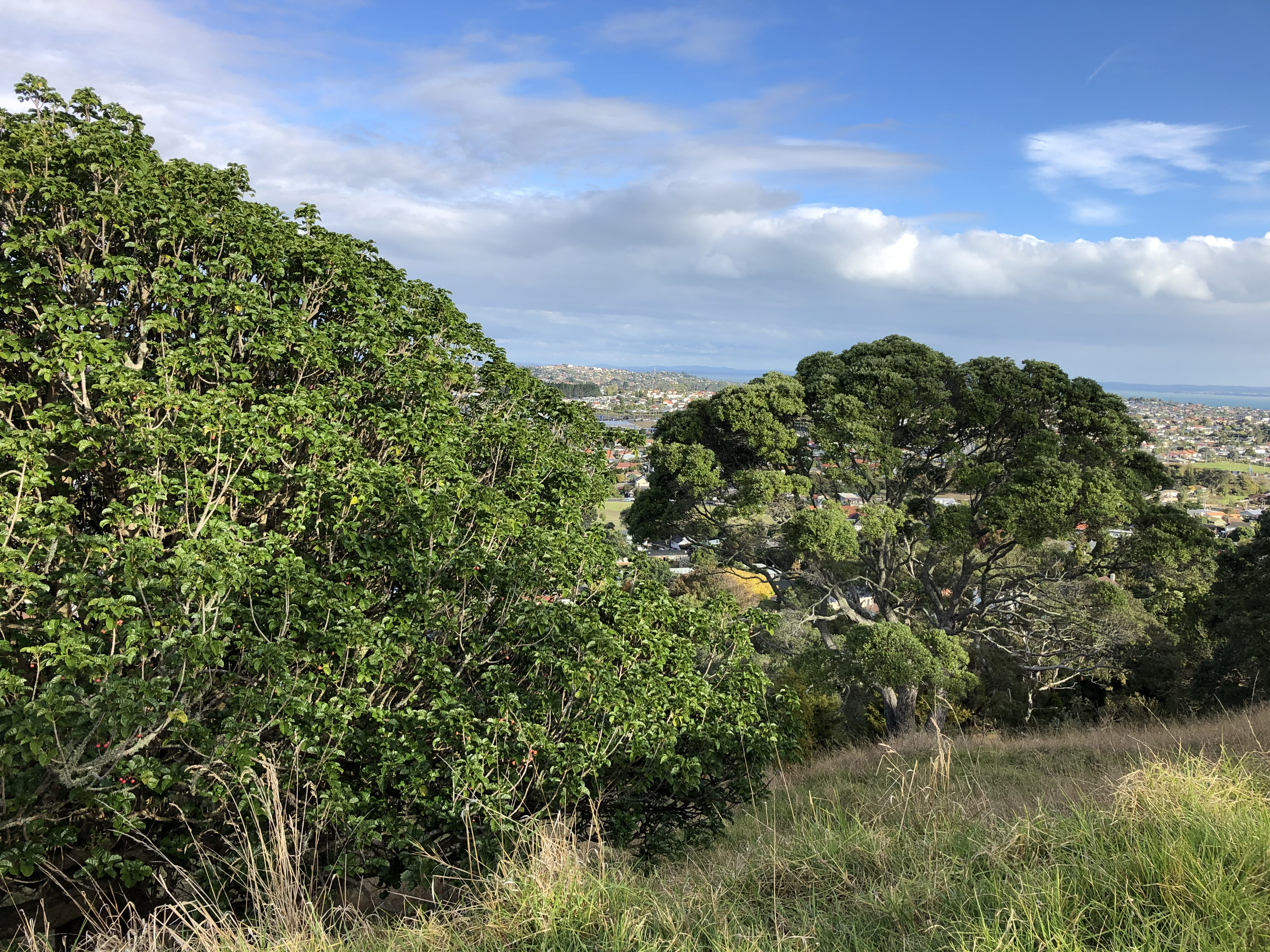
Mature pūriri and pōhutukawa trees growing on Ōwairaka / Te Ahi-kā-a-Rakataura / Mount Albert. More than half the current tree canopy are natives.

As part of a large works plan to restore the maunga, including native vegetation and native wildlife habitats, the TMA planned to plant than 74,000 new native trees and shrubs on them by 2021. In 12 months during 2018–2019, 19,000 of these were planted on the Tūpuna Maunga.

The TMA plans to remove 345 exotic trees and plant 13,000 new native trees and plants on Ōwairaka / Te Ahi-kā-a-Rakataura / Mount Albert. Many of the exotic trees are classified as pest or weed species under the Auckland Regional Pest Management Strategy. The work also aims to preserve and enhance sightlines between Auckland's maunga. The work had resource consent, the support of ecologists, arborists, Auckland Council, the Tree Council, Forest and Bird and the Tāmaki Collective.

In November 2019 a group of protesters blocked the removal of exotic trees, voicing concerns for exotic and native fauna and flora. In December 2020, the High Court found the TMA and Auckland Council had both acted lawfully, allowing the native restoration plans to proceed. In March 2022, the Court of Appeal found that the TMA plan breached the Reserves Act and did not appropriately consult with the public. Consequently, the Resource Consent was 'set aside'. In June, the Supreme Court refused to hear an application by the TMA to appeal the decision. The TMA noted "the Court of Appeal did not decide against tree removal, rather the legal process to be followed."

== Pest control ==
In 2022, the TMA received a $3m funding boost to work with the Department of Conservation / Te Papa Atawhai to eliminate pests on the Tūpuna Maunga over the following three years, creating 39 full-time jobs, and allowing native flora and fauna to flourish.

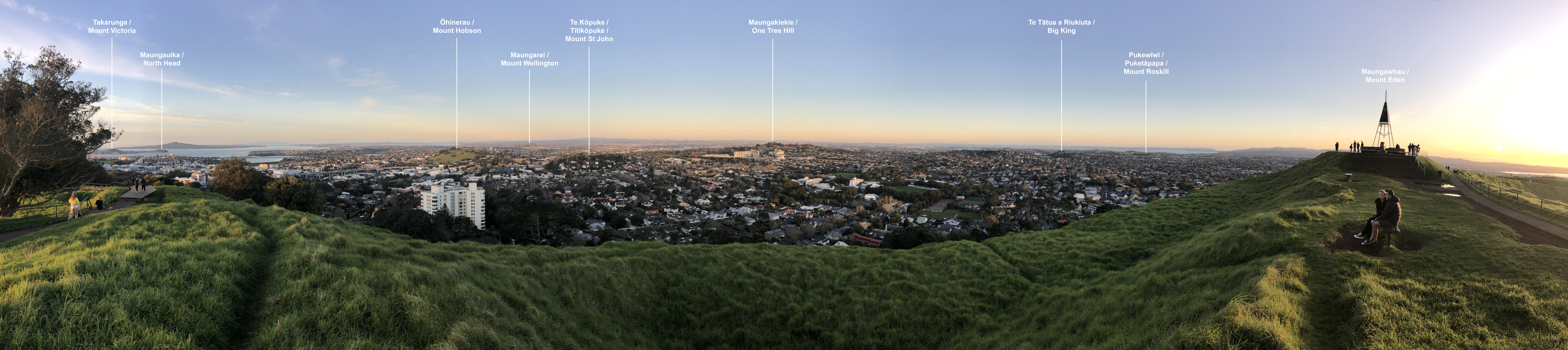
Eight Tūpuna Maunga visible in a panorama view from Maungawhau / Mount Eden.
