= Te Tātua a Riukiuta =

Scoria cone in Auckland, New Zealand

- Big King
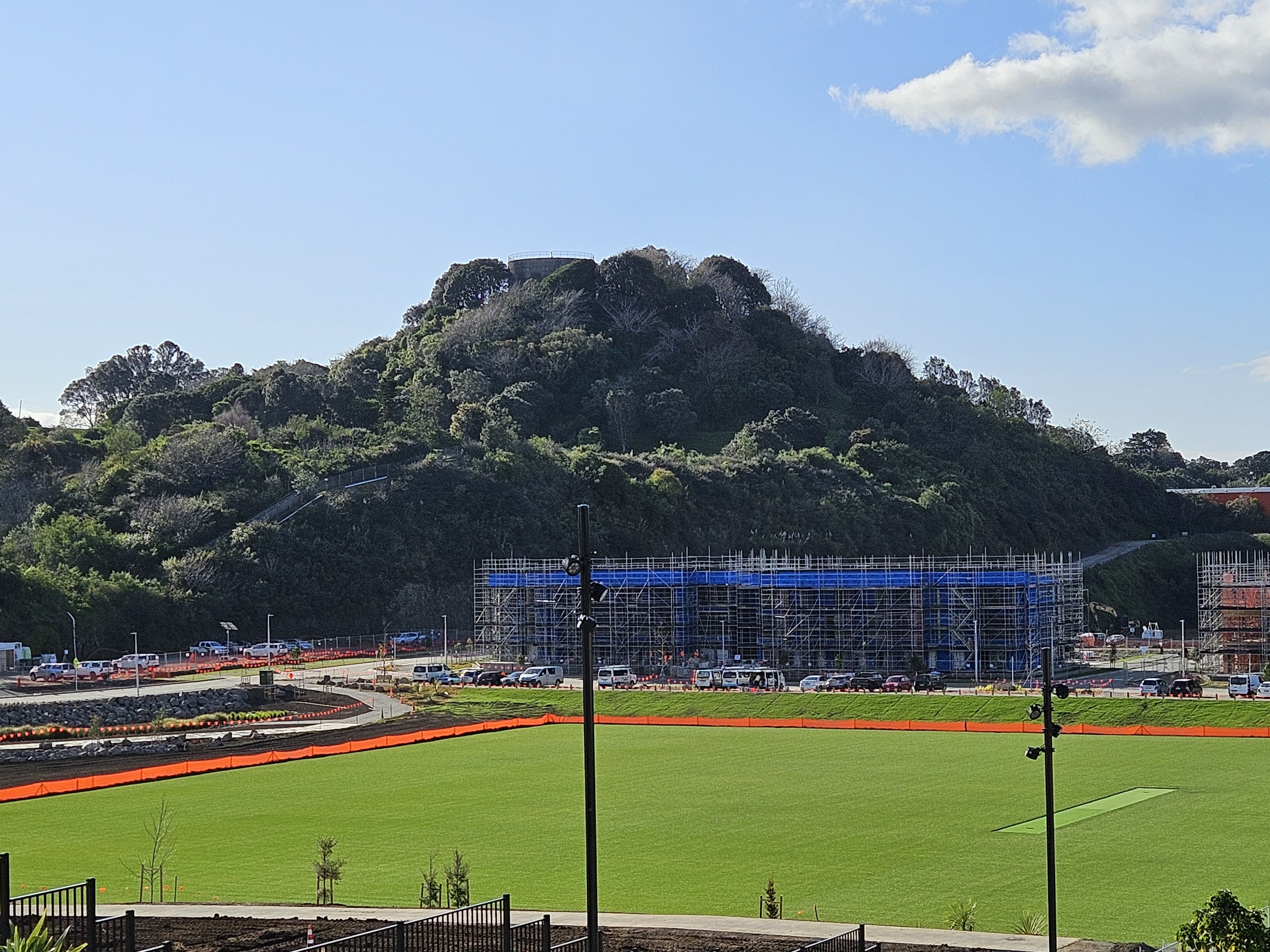
- Te Tātua a Riukiuta seen from Three Kings Plaza

Highest point
- Elevation: 133 m (436 ft)
- Coordinates: 36.902926°S 174.754651°E

Geography
- Location: Auckland, North Island, New Zealand
- Parent range: Auckland volcanic field

Geology
- Volcanic field: Auckland volcanic field

Te Tātua a Riukiuta / Big King is a volcano and Tūpuna Maunga (ancestral mountain) in Three Kings, New Zealand that erupted 28,500 years ago. The volcano had three prominent peaks known as Three Kings and a number of smaller peaks until most of them were quarried away, leaving a sole remaining large peak known as Big King.

== Geology ==
Te Tātua a Riukiuta was probably the most complex volcano in the Auckland volcanic field, consisting of five significant scoria cones and about a dozen smaller scoria mounds, sitting inside a large explosion crater. Along the edge of this crater to the south runs Mount Albert Road, and to the north, Landscape Road. At 800 metres (2,600 ft) across and nearly 200 metres (660 ft) deep, the explosion crater, which was caused by the initial eruption, was the largest in Auckland. The crater no longer exists today. The three largest scoria cones of the group were Big King at 133 m (436 ft) high, East King at 120 m (390 ft) high, and Highest King, which was 135 m (443 ft) high.

Lava flows ran from here down a stream valley for three kilometres to Western Springs. These flows created lava tunnels which still exist under the surface. Thus, rainwater falling on Te Tātua a Riukiuta and the surrounding area is channeled underground for miles until it emerges at Western Springs Te Wai Ōrea Lake. Most of these lava tunnels have collapsed but sections of them form caves and can be accessed from private properties in the area. It was formerly believed that the lava had travelled further and formed Meola Reef at Point Chevalier, but in 2008 it was discovered that the Meola Reef lava had come from the older Te Kōpuke / Mount Saint John volcano.

The eruption occurred 28,500 years ago. Charred twigs and wood were found in six boreholes drilled through Te Tātua a Riukiuta lava flows in 2006 and carbon dating of the organic material produced six very similar dates around 28,500 years.

== History ==
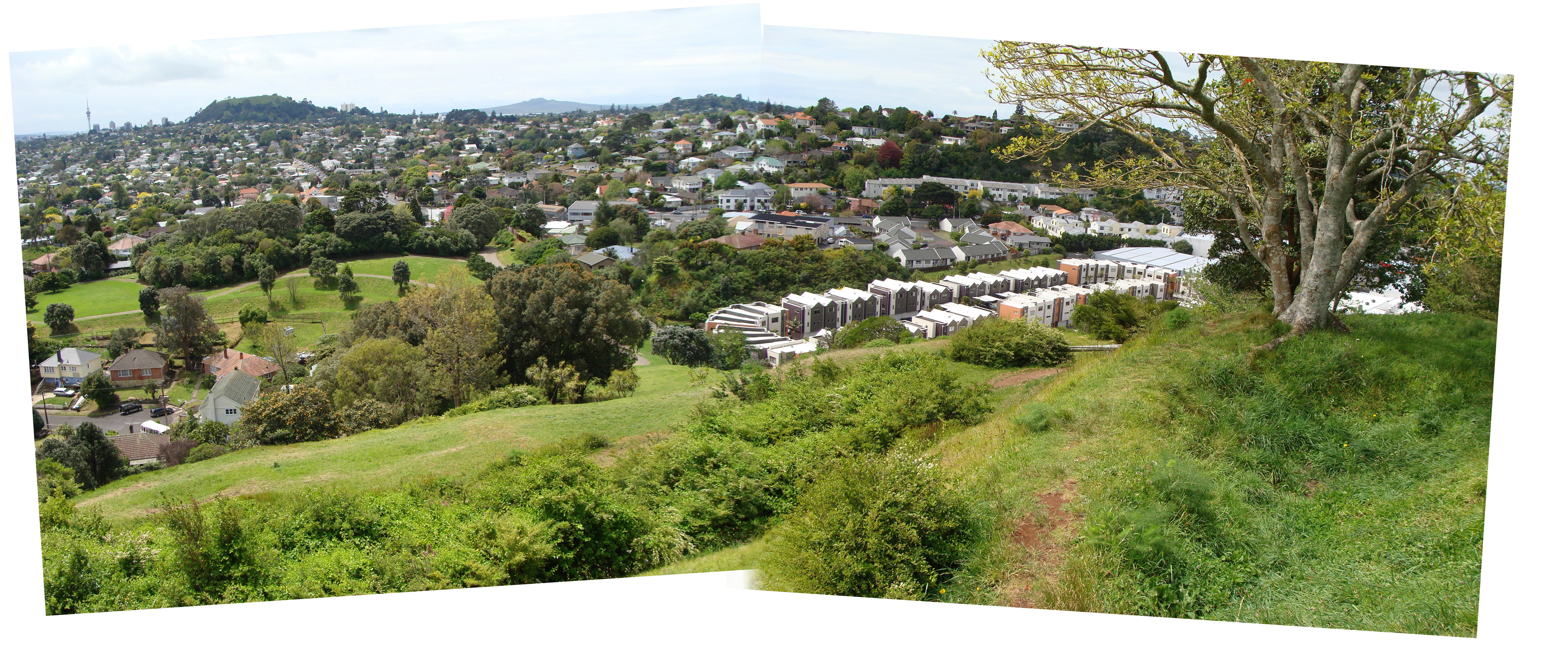
View north-east from the summit of Te Tātua a Riukiuta, showing terracing on the slopes from when it was a pā site.

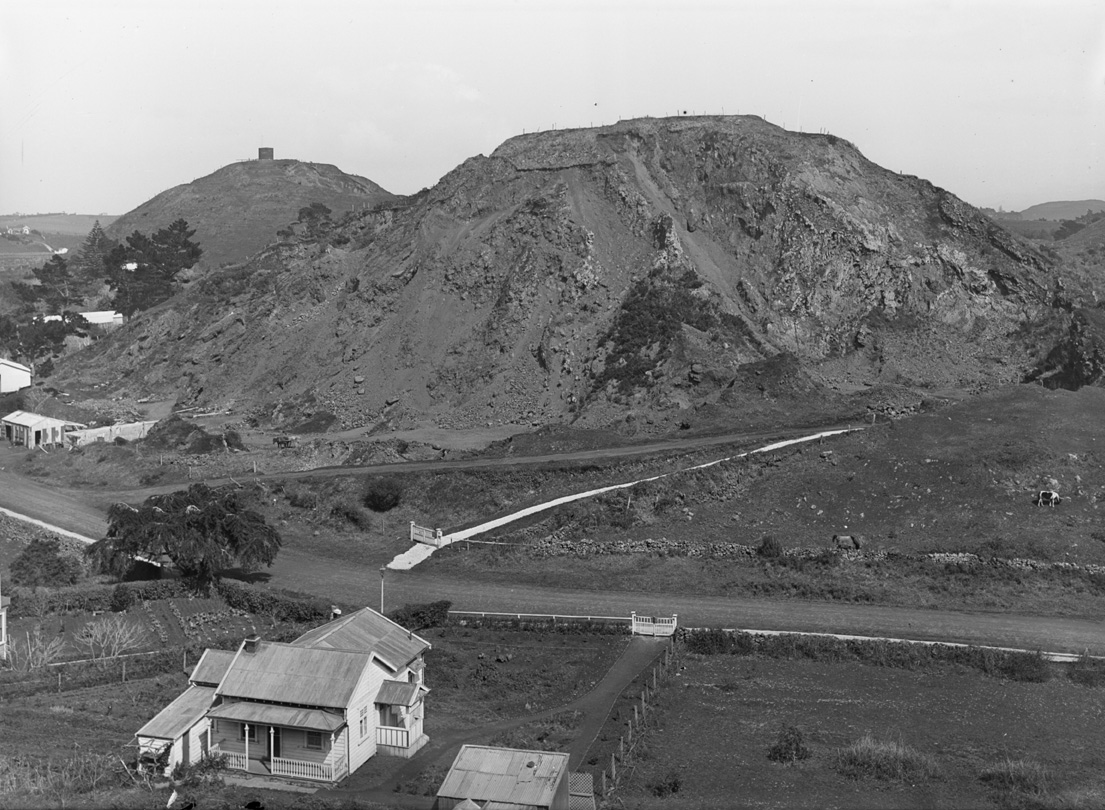
View looking west, made in 1920, showing Three Kings Road (later Mount Eden Road, foreground) and part of Te Tātua a Riukiuta: Highest King is in the background to the left, with East King to its right.

An earlier name for the volcano was Te Tatua o Mataaho (the war belt of Mataaho), which referred to a deity living in the Maungawhau crater. It was later adapted to Te Tātua a Riukiuta, which referred to Riukiuta, a senior priest of the Tainui waka who brought together diverse genealogical lines of the local tribes. The name Three Kings derives from the biblical Magi, and was named by Captain William Hobson's surveyor Felton Mathew in 1841. Big King refers to the second-highest (and only remaining) peak.

Te Tātua a Riukiuta was once the site of a pā, occupied during the Waiohua confederation era of the 17th and 18th centuries. The stone walled pā was built by Kowhatukiteuru, rangatira of the West Auckland iwi Te Kawerau ā Maki, to assist his Waiohua relative Te Rauiti. Te Tātua a Riukiuta has retained Māori earthworks from that era such as kumara pits and terracing.

The area has been drastically quarried over the years for the red scoria it contains, and only one of the three large peaks (Te Tātua a Riukiuta / Big King) remains today, largely because of the water reservoir that was built on its summit at the beginning of the 20th century. The reservoir is below the hydraulic grade of the area and is hence maintained as an emergency supply reservoir only.

However, the large scoria deposits in the surrounding area are still being quarried. The groundwater level became a problem for the quarry in 1995, and Winstone Aggregates, the company operating the quarry, arranged with the Auckland City Council to supply the water to the region. However, as a result of local opposition to this arrangement, the water is instead discarded into the sea. This dewatering has led to concerns about subsidence.

=== Treaty settlement ===
In the 2014 Treaty of Waitangi settlement between the Crown and the Ngā Mana Whenua o Tāmaki Makaurau collective of 13 Auckland iwi and hapū (also known as the Tāmaki Collective), ownership of the 14 Tūpuna Maunga of Tāmaki Makaurau / Auckland, was vested to the collective, including the volcano officially named Te Tātua a Riukiuta. The legislation specified that the land be held in trust "for the common benefit of Ngā Mana Whenua o Tāmaki Makaurau and the other people of Auckland". The Tūpuna Maunga o Tāmaki Makaurau Authority or Tūpuna Maunga Authority (TMA) is the co-governance organisation established to administer the 14 Tūpuna Maunga. Auckland Council manages the Tūpuna Maunga under the direction of the TMA.
