= Mount Smart =

Hill in New Zealand

Rarotonga / Mount Smart
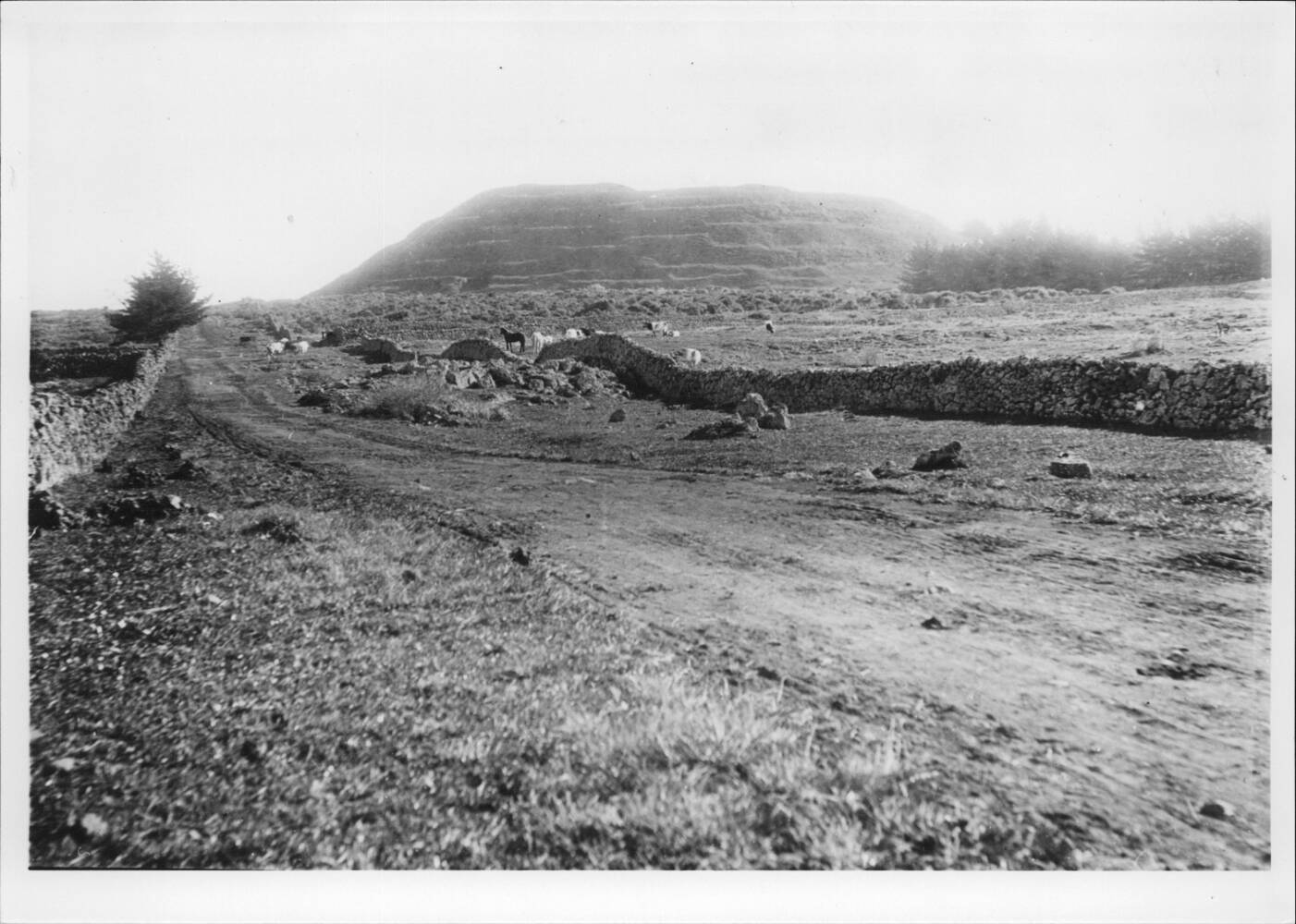
- Rarotonga / Mt Smart, showing terracing excavated by Māori, photographed in 1899.

Highest point
- Coordinates: 36°55′6″S 174°48′45″E

Naming
- Native name: Rarotonga (Māori); Te Ipu kura a Maki (Māori)

Geography
- Location: North Island, New Zealand

Geology
- Volcanic field: Auckland volcanic field

Mount Smart (Māori: Rarotonga or Te Ipu kura a Maki; officially Rarotonga / Mount Smart) is one of the volcanoes and Tūpuna Maunga (ancestral mountain) in the Auckland volcanic field. A century of quarrying removed almost all the 87 metre scoria cone along with extensive terracing excavated by Māori. The former quarry is now the site of Mount Smart Stadium.

== Geography and history ==
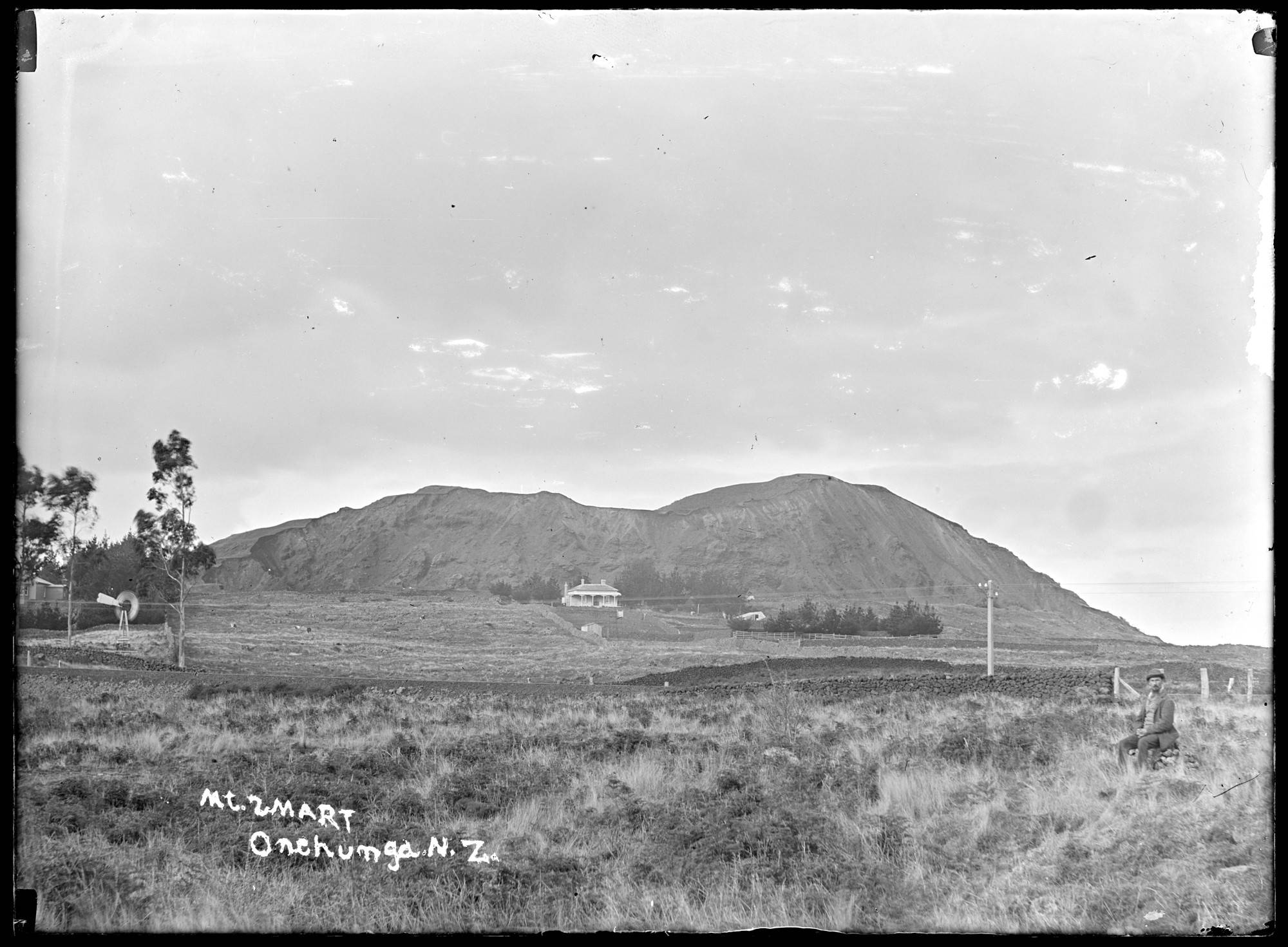
Rarotonga / Mount Smart photographed in the early 1900s, before the scoria cone was quarried away.

The volcano erupted around 20,000 years ago. The scoria cone was formerly 87 metres high with a small crater (around 57 m higher than the surrounding land). Lava flowed about 300 hectares from the eruption, reaching the Manukau Harbour at Māngere. It was the site of defensive Māori pā built on extensive excavated terracing.

The name Rarotonga means "the lower south" and was brought from Hawaiki. In Māori oral tradition, Rarotonga is where Rakataura, a tohunga of the Tainui waka, first settled in Aotearoa. After a period of time, Rakataura decided to travel south with his wife Kahukeke, who died during the journey. Te Ipu kura a Maki means "the red bowl of Maki".

Rarotonga was renamed Mount Smart by Felton Mathew, Surveyor General, after Lieutenant Henry Dalton Smart, 28th (North Gloucestershire) Regiment of Foot, commanding the Mounted Police in New Zealand from 1840.

During 1865 to the 1960s Mount Smart was mostly quarried away. Lower southern and eastern slopes remain and were planted in pōhutukawa during the 1940s. At the same time, the quarry was reserved, and Mt Smart Stadium was built in the 1960s.

In the 2014 Treaty of Waitangi settlement between the Crown and the Ngā Mana Whenua o Tāmaki Makaurau collective of 13 Auckland iwi and hapū (also known as the Tāmaki Collective), ownership of the 14 Tūpuna Maunga of Tāmaki Makaurau / Auckland, was vested to the collective, including the volcano officially named Rarotonga / Mount Smart. The legislation specified that the land be held in trust "for the common benefit of Ngā Mana Whenua o Tāmaki Makaurau and the other people of Auckland". The Tūpuna Maunga o Tāmaki Makaurau Authority or Tūpuna Maunga Authority (TMA) is the co-governance organisation established to administer the 14 Tūpuna Maunga. Auckland Council manages the Tūpuna Maunga under the direction of the TMA.
