= Ōwairaka / Mount Albert =

Scoria cone in Auckland, New Zealand

- Te Ahi-kā-a-Rakataura
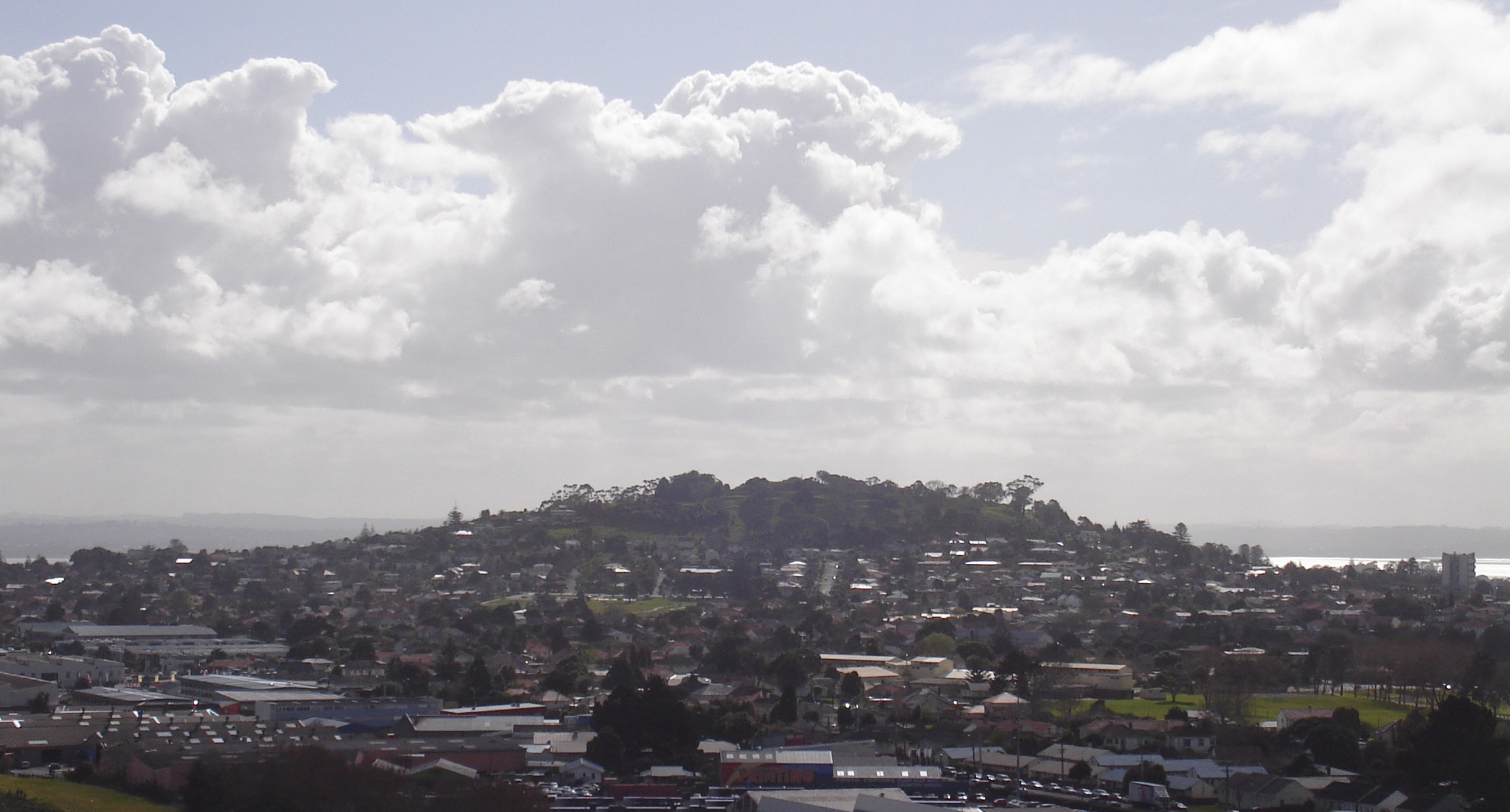
- Ōwairaka / Mount Albert, in the suburbs of Ōwairaka and Mt Albert.

Highest point
- Elevation: 135 m (443 ft)
- Coordinates: 36.8905665997°S 174.720112686°E

Geography
- Location: North Island, New Zealand
- Parent range: Auckland volcanic field

Geology
- Volcanic field: Auckland volcanic field
- Last eruption: 120,000 years ago

Ōwairaka / Mount Albert, also known as Te Ahi-kā-a-Rakataura, is a volcanic peak and Tūpuna Maunga (ancestral mountain) which dominates the landscape of the Ōwairaka and Mount Albert suburbs of Auckland.

== Etymology ==
The main Māori name of the peak is Ōwairaka, which means 'Place of Wairaka'. Wairaka was the daughter of Toroa, the commander of one of the great voyaging canoes, Mātaatua. Wairaka is renowned for naming Whakatāne, a town in the Eastern Bay of Plenty where she saved the waka from drifting out to sea. She is depicted in the Statue of Wairaka located at Whakatāne Heads. Wairaka subsequently moved to Tāmaki Makaurau to avoid an arranged marriage and set up her own pā at Ōwairaka.

The other Māori name, Te Ahi-kā-a-Rakataura, means 'the long burning fires of Rakataura', referring to its continuous occupation by the Tainui explorer Rakatāura (also known as Hape).

One of the earliest names Tāmaki Māori gave to the volcano was Te Puke o Ruarangi (The Hill of Ruarangi). A traditional story involves Ruarangi, a chief of the supernatural Patupaiarehe people, escaping a siege on Ōwairaka / Mount Albert through lava tunnels and emerging at Western Springs Te Wai Ōrea.

The mountain was given the English name, Mount Albert, after Queen Victoria's consort, Prince Albert, following a petition in 1866 to the Superintendent of Auckland Province.

None of the three names are official. In 2014, the Tāmaki Collective agreed that both Ōwairaka and Te Ahi-kā-a-Rakataura reflected the historical association of local Māori with this site. Of the three, Ōwairaka is the most commonly used name.

Auckland Council and the Tūpuna Maunga Authority refer to the site as Ōwairaka / Te Ahi-kā-a-Rakataura / Mount Albert. It is commonly known by the dual name Ōwairaka / Mount Albert.

In January 2020, historian Pita Tūrei disputed the historical accuracy of Ōwairaka being named after Wairaka, claiming that the name is instead a shortening of Te Wai o Rakataura, a name for the wetlands of the Oakley Creek.

== Geography and history ==
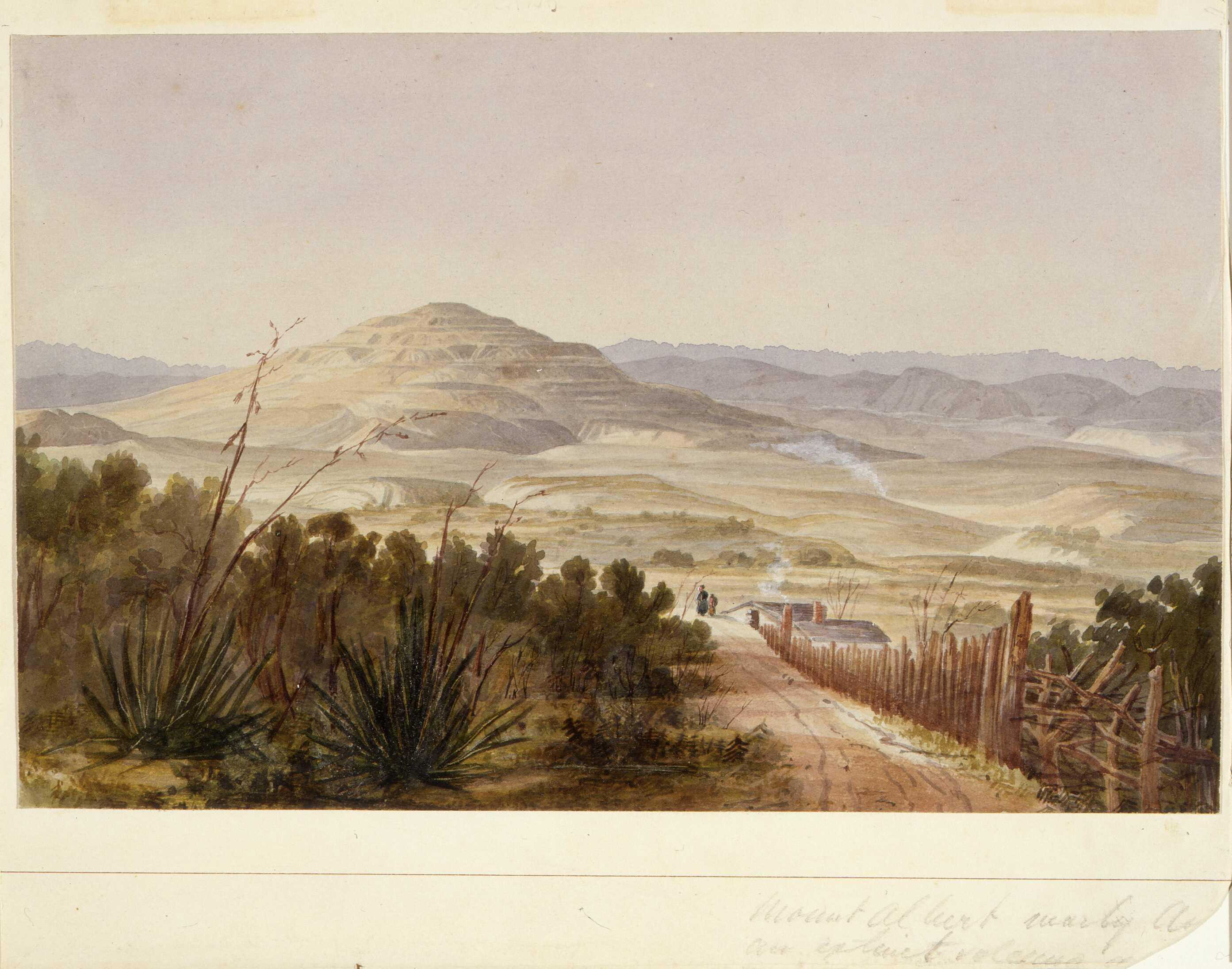
Ōwairaka / Mount Albert watercolour painted by John Guise Mitford in 1845. The ridged terraces were excavated by Māori for occupation and defence. Most were later destroyed by quarrying.

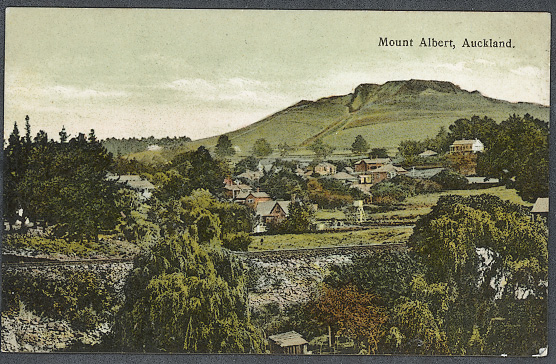
View of volcanic scoria cone Ōwairaka / Mount Albert, in a postcard from around 1910.

The peak, in parkland at the southern end of the suburb, is 135 metres (443 ft) in height, and is one of about 53 extinct cones across the city of Auckland, all of which are part of the Auckland volcanic field.

The volcano erupted around 120,000 years ago. The peak was formerly 148 metres (486 ft) high and the site of one of many important Māori pā in the region, with prominent excavated terracing and trenches for occupation and defence.

Ngāti Awa chief Titahi and a section of his iwi (tribe) are credited for the earthworks, although the work probably took several generations, using hand tools. Ōwairaka was a 'sister mountain' to Maungakiekie that Titahi similarly excavated. Ōwairaka was later a pā of the Waiohua confederation of Tāmaki, visited seasonally by paramount chief Kiwi Tāmaki when it was the season for birds to be preserved. The pā had a population of up to about one and a half thousand during the 16th and 17th centuries. After Te Taoū Ngāti Whātua defeated Waiohua in the great battle of Paruroa, Ōwairaka was captured and occupied by members of Te Taoū, Ngā Oho and Te Uringutu. Through strategic marriages, the victors joined bloodlines with Tāmaki, meaning Ngāti Whātua Ōrākei shares descent with groups who occupied Tāmaki Makaurau for centuries.

After the land was acquired by the Crown in 1841 and subdivided into small farms, extensive quarrying reduced the height of the scoria cone by about 15 metres (49 ft), significantly altered its shape and reduced the land mass to less than half. Quarrying stopped in 1928 due to pressure to retain Māori trenches which had influenced those built in World War 1. The volcano originally had two craters. One was levelled to make a playing field in the 1900s. The other was formed into the Auckland Regional Council water reservoir in 1945. The basalt quarry pit was levelled off in 1961 for an archery field and the insides of the cone was smoothed off, removing more archeological traces. Comparatively few remnants of Māori earthworks remain, but the site remains significant to both Māori and archaeologically.

Current uses of the maunga (mountain) include recreational walking, playing field, an archery club and the water reservoir under the paddock on the mountain's southern side.

== Treaty settlement ==
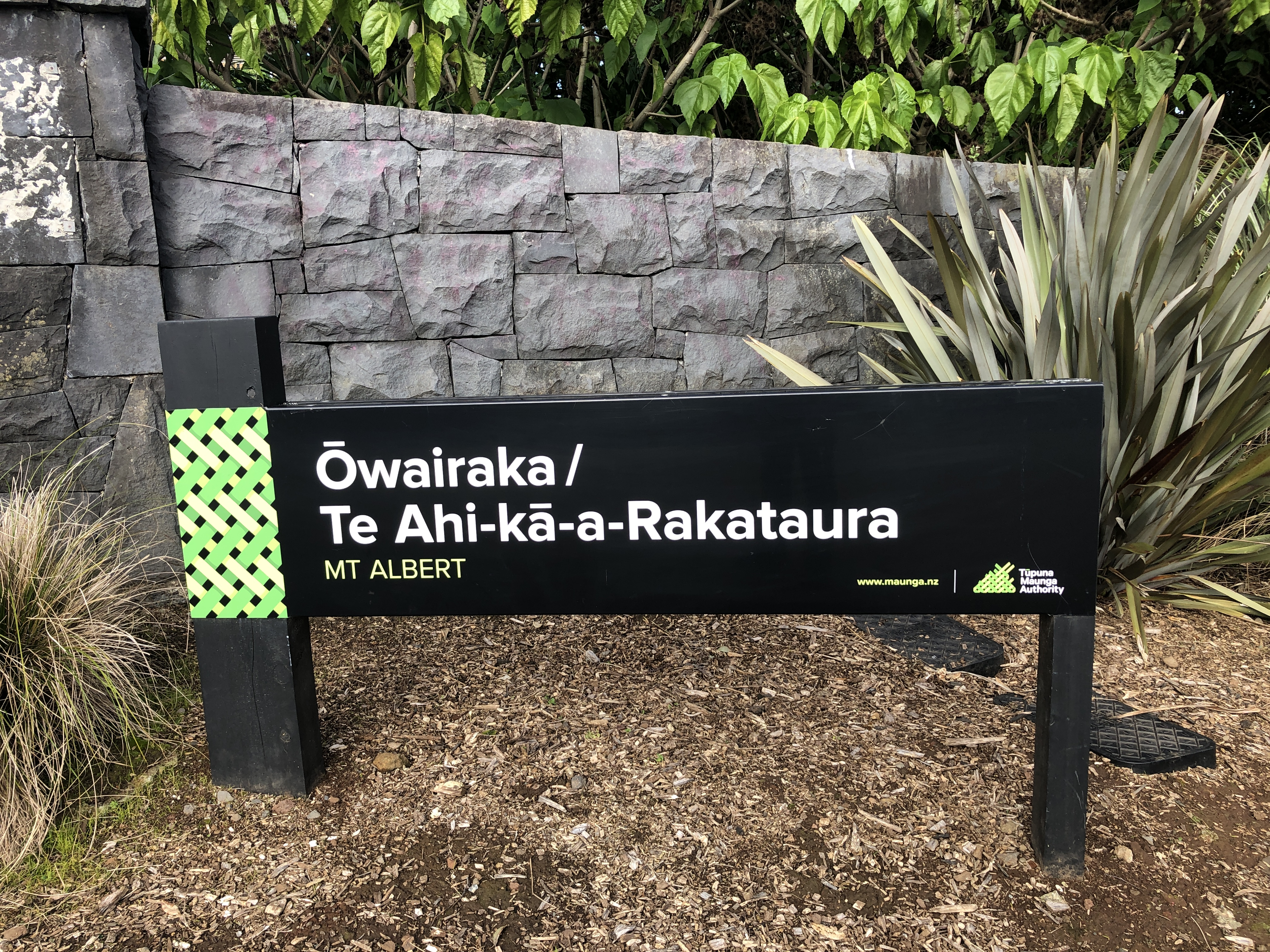
The Ōwairaka / Mount Albert main entrance sign.

In the 2014 Treaty of Waitangi settlement between the Crown and the Ngā Mana Whenua o Tāmaki Makaurau collective of 13 Auckland iwi and hapū (also known as the Tāmaki Collective), ownership of the 14 Tūpuna Maunga of Tāmaki Makaurau / Auckland was vested to the collective. The legislation specified that the land be held in trust "for the common benefit of Ngā Mana Whenua o Tāmaki Makaurau and the other people of Auckland".

Legislation also specified that the 14 Tūpuna Maunga of Auckland, including Ōwairaka / Mount Albert, are reserves and subject to the Reserves Act 1977. Ōwairaka / Mount Albert is classified as a 'recreation reserve'.

Tūpuna Maunga o Tāmaki Makaurau Authority or Tūpuna Maunga Authority (TMA) is the co-governance organisation established to administer the 14 Tūpuna Maunga. Auckland Council manages the Tūpuna Maunga under the direction of the TMA.

== Vehicle access ==
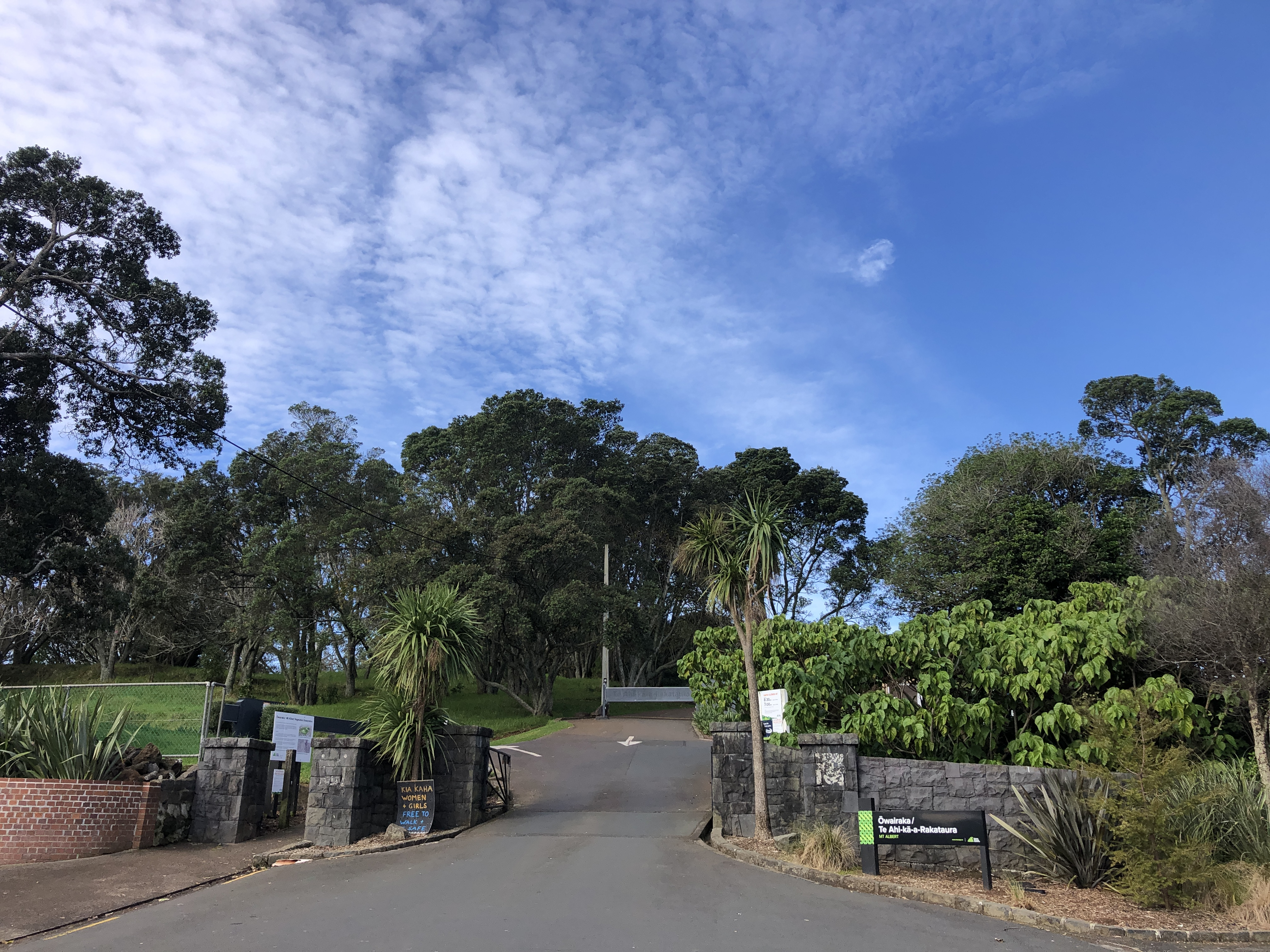
The main entrance to Ōwairaka / Mount Albert, showing the two gates that stop most vehicles from accessing the road.

Due to the spiritual and cultural significance of the maunga to Māori, and for pedestrian safety, the summit road was permanently closed to most vehicles in March 2019.

== Native vegetation restoration ==
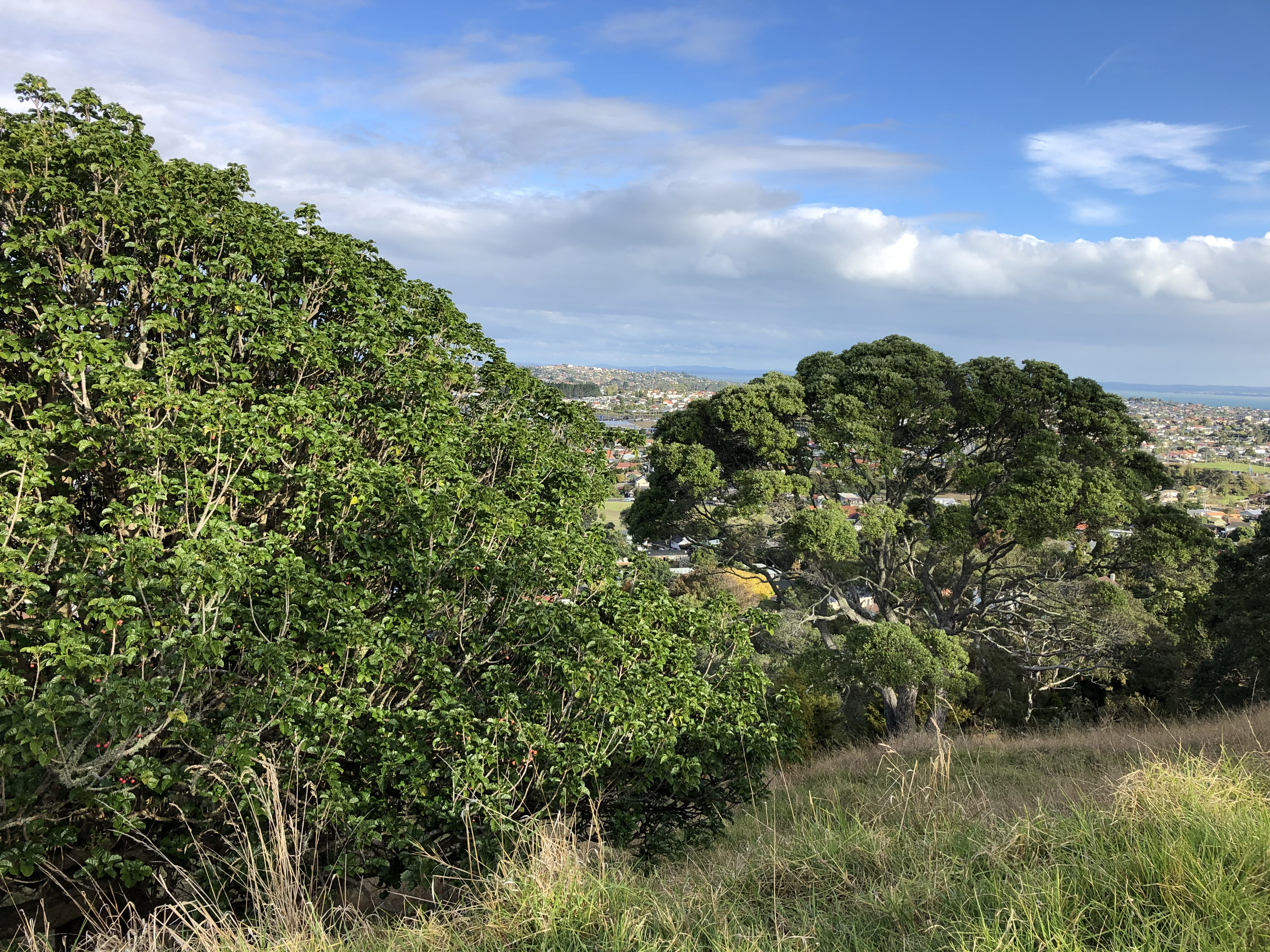
Mature pūriri and pōhutukawa trees growing on Ōwairaka / Mount Albert. More than half the current tree canopy are natives.

As part of a large works plan to restore the maunga, including native vegetation and native wildlife habitats, the TMA plans to remove 345 exotic trees and plant 13,000 new native trees and plants. Many of the exotic trees are classified as pest or weed species under the Auckland Regional Pest Management Strategy. The work also aims to preserve and enhance sightlines between Auckland's maunga. The work had resource consent, the support of ecologists, arborists, Auckland Council, the Tree Council, Forest and Bird and the Tāmaki Collective.

In November 2019 a group of protesters blocked the removal of exotic trees, voicing concerns for exotic and native fauna and flora.

In January 2020, Pouroto Ngaropo, described as the 'chair of Ngāti Awa ki Te Awa o Te Atua', claimed ancestral links to Ōwairaka and spoke in opposition to the TMA plan from a te ao Māori perspective. The mandated representative of the Ngāti Awa iwi, Te Rūnanga o Ngāti Awa, said Tāmaki Collective iwi had the right to cull the trees.

In May 2020, in response to the impasse caused by the protest and offensive graffiti at the site, representatives of Ngāti Whātua Ōrākei publicly requested the TMA, Auckland Council and protestors work together to find a compromise to continue the native tree regeneration.

In June 2020 a Māori woman claimed to have been racially abused in the car park at Mount Albert, and said the "[protest] group's presence had heightened tensions on Mt Albert". The TMA said other local Māori, including children, felt uncomfortable visiting and security was lifted.

In November 2020, a bird scientist expressed concern over the removal of the trees during native bird nesting season, requesting any work be delayed until February.

In December 2020, the High Court found the TMA and Auckland Council had both acted lawfully, allowing the native restoration plans to proceed. In March 2022, the Court of Appeal found that the TMA plan breached the Reserves Act and did not appropriately consult with the public. Consequently, the Resource Consent was 'set aside'. In June, the Supreme Court refused to hear an application by the TMA to appeal the decision. The TMA noted "the Court of Appeal did not decide against tree removal, rather the legal process to be followed."
