= Pigeon Mountain (New Zealand) =

Hill in New Zealand

Ōhuiarangi / Pigeon Mountain
- Pigeon Mountain
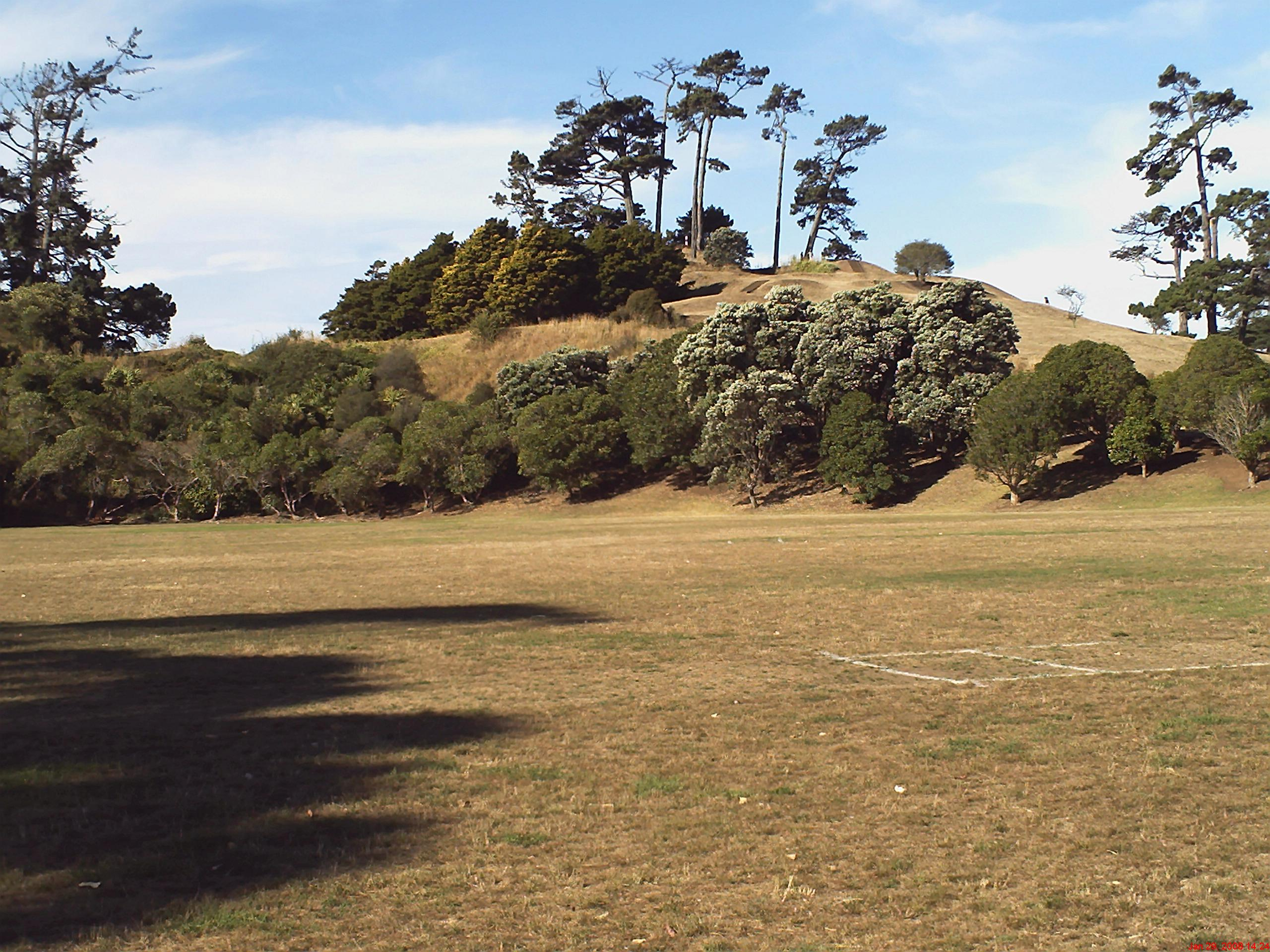
- Pigeon Mountain and a small portion of the playing field

Highest point
- Elevation: 58 m (190 ft) (Note: There is disagreement in the official source as to height. On the same web page the NZ Gazetteer states 53m in text and displays the official map at 58m. For the moment the official map is assumed accurate, as more sources agree. The present height can of course be redetermined, noting that the area has been subject to landscaping.)
- Coordinates: 36°53′19″S 174°54′13″E

Naming
- Native name: Ōhuiarangi (Māori)

Geography
- Location: North Island, New Zealand

Geology
- Rock age: 23,400 years
- Volcanic field: Auckland volcanic field

Pigeon Mountain (Māori: Ōhuiarangi, officially Ōhuiarangi / Pigeon Mountain) is a 58 m (190 ft) high volcanic cone and Tūpuna Maunga (ancestral mountain) at Half Moon Bay, near Howick and Bucklands Beach, in Auckland, New Zealand. It is part of the Auckland volcanic field.

== Geography ==
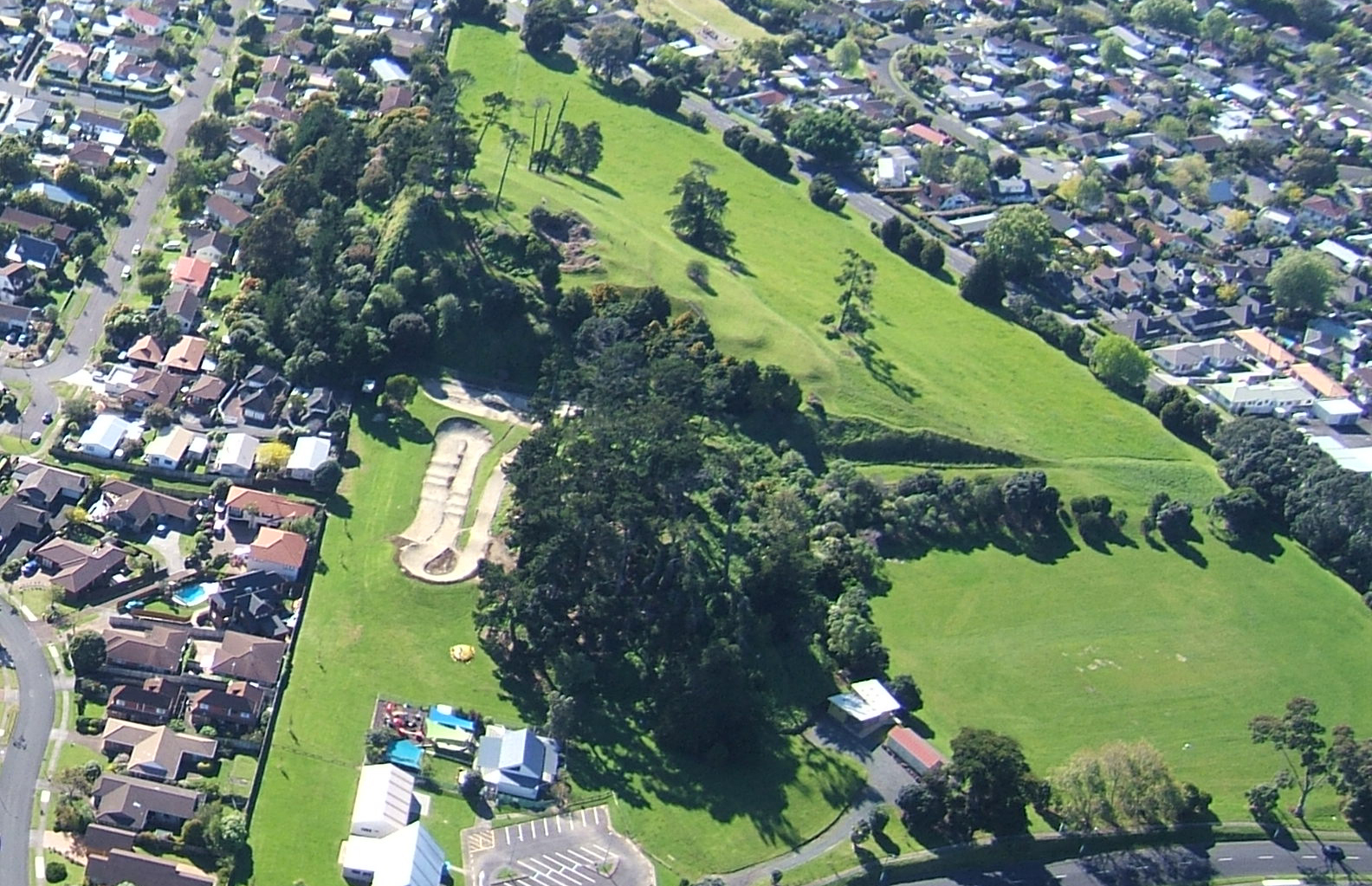
Aerial view of Ōhuiarangi / Pigeon Mountain in 2009

The volcano erupted around 24,000 years ago, forming a large crater and tuff ring about 500 metres (1,600 ft) wide. The prominent tuff ring is still clearly visible extending in an arc south of Sunderlands Road. Two much smaller craters were formed to the north west of the main cone. The smaller lies buried under Pigeon Mountain Road outside number 18, and the other forms Heights Park, a private reserve for the owners of 29–41 Pigeon Mountain Road and 14–36 Prince Regent Drive and 33–39 Tyrian Close.

== History ==
=== Māori history ===
The hill has several known traditional names in Māori. One is Te Pakuranga-Rāhihi, shortened to Pakuranga, which refers to a legendary battle between the supernatural Tūrehu people that begun at the hill. Two other names include Pukepane and Ōhuiarangi, the latter which literally means "the desire of Rangi". refers to the early Tāmaki Māori ancestress Huiarangi, daughter of Tāmaki and granddaughter of Maruiwi of the early iwi Te Tini o Maruiwi and Ngāti Ruatāmore, an ancestor of Ngāi Tai ki Tāmaki. When Tāmaki Makaurau was visited by the ancestor Toi-te-huatahi, Huiarangi was one of the most prominent Te Tini o Maruiwi figures in the early settlement of Tāmaki Makaurau.

The slopes of Ōhuiarangi / Pigeon Mountain became an important site for agriculture, and extensive stonefield gardens were constructed here. The hill was known as a location for snaring kererū, and a defensive pā was constructed at the peak. Over time, the people who settled at the mountain came to identify themselves as the iwi Ngāriki. In the 17th century, Ngāi Tai warrior Kapetaua attacked the pā, after which Kapetaua's people built a smaller pā on the hill. The hill was occupied until the early 1820s. The Ōhuiarangi pā and surrounding area were evacuated during the Musket Wars, and a tapu was placed on the land due to the events of the conflict.

=== European history ===
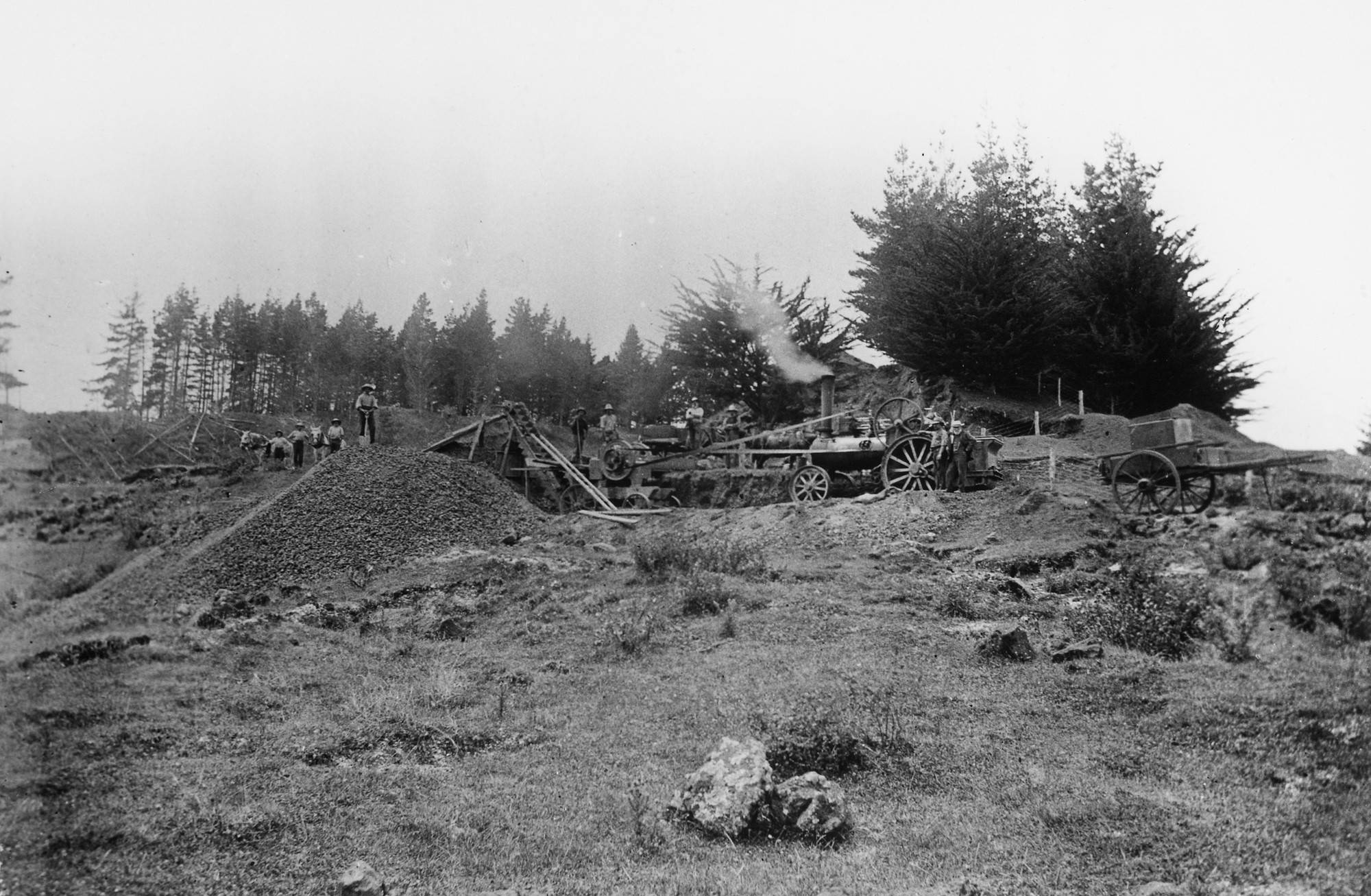
A stone crusher operating at the Pigeon Mountain quarry circa 1910

Early European settlers named the hill Pigeon Mountain, after the many kererū feeding on the pigeonwood trees seen here. The mountain was extensively quarried from 1913 to the 1970s, with the entire north half of the volcano removed. It was first quarried for roading metal by Fencibles from the 1847 Fencibles settlement at Howick. In the 1920s the Shaw brothers worked with Harold Kearney, Dud Langdon and Jim Taylor using a pair of draught horses to pull a dray loaded with metal. In 1848 John Campbell and James Smyth, both from the fencible ship Sir Robert Sale, had the contract to spread metal on the road from Howick to Panmure, for which they were paid 5/- per day. At that time the mountain was named Pigeon Tree Hill.

The 5 acre farm immediately to the south was owned by the 1847 Irish Fitzpatrick family of Patrick and Ann who came in the Minerva fencible ship. They lived in a raupo hut at Howick for two years. They had had 12 children, 9 of whom survived. The children all attended Pakuranga school, a short distance across the paddocks to the south east. Fitzpatrick later bought other land around Pigeon Mountain at Hutchinson Road and Bucklands Beach Road, expanding his farm to 20 acres. A photo taken of the Pakuranga Cricket club, which played at Pigeon Mountain, shows 6 of the 16 players were from the Fitzpatrick family. His original fencibles cottage was still in use in the 1960s by two of his grandsons who were the caretakers of the Pigeon Mountain sports ground in their youth. On their death the cottage was placed at the Howick Historical Village. A number of Fencibles' widows also received land south of Pigeon Mountain which was very swampy. Margaret Coyle received 4 acres of land where Pakuranga College is today.

In 1929 a fresh water spring was uncovered and water was piped to Howick and district at a cost of £9,340.

Artefacts as well as skulls were found at the site in the 1960s by students from Pakuranga College.

The north face is partly fenced off and is an almost vertical drop of 30 metres (100 ft). In the southwest corner there is a playing field built on a free-draining scoria base. On the quarried north-western side is a kindergarten and Scout hall.

== Treaty settlement ==
In the 2014 Treaty of Waitangi settlement between the Crown and the Ngā Mana Whenua o Tāmaki Makaurau collective of 13 Auckland iwi and hapū (also known as the Tāmaki Collective), ownership of the 14 Tūpuna Maunga of Auckland, was vested to the collective, including Ōhuiarangi / Pigeon Mountain. The legislation specified that the land be held in trust "for the common benefit of Ngā Mana Whenua o Tāmaki Makaurau and the other people of Auckland". The Tūpuna Maunga o Tāmaki Makaurau Authority or Tūpuna Maunga Authority (TMA) is the co-governance organisation established to administer the 14 Tūpuna Maunga. Auckland Council manages the Tūpuna Maunga under the direction of the TMA.

As part of a plan to restore the hill, including native vegetation and native wildlife habitats, around 112 exotic trees, including pests, have been removed and 33,000 new native trees and shrubs are being planted. The work aims to and enhance sightlines to the summit and preserving historic features.
