= Ōhinerau / Mount Hobson =

Volcanic cone in Auckland, New Zealand

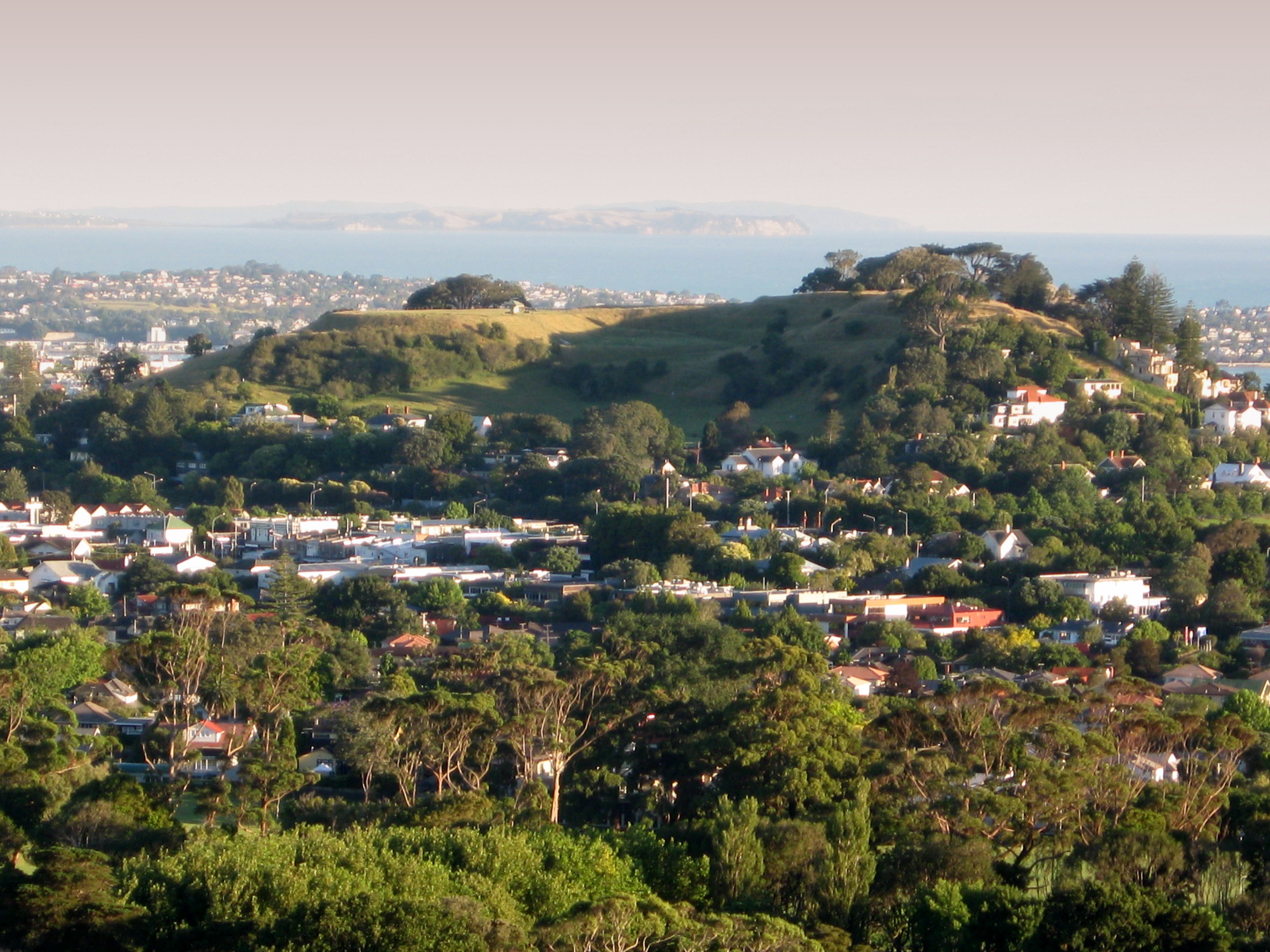
- Ōhinerau / Mount Hobson as viewed from One Tree Hill.

Highest point
- Elevation: 143 m (469 ft)
- Coordinates: 36.877814°S 174.786156°E

Geography
- Location: Auckland, North Island, New Zealand

Geology
- Volcanic field: Auckland volcanic field

Ōhinerau / Mount Hobson (also known as Ōhinerangi and Remuwera) is a 143 m high volcanic cone and Tūpuna Maunga (ancestral mountain) in the Auckland volcanic field in Auckland, New Zealand.

== Geography ==
Located in the Remuera suburb, to the east of the Newmarket commercial suburb, it has been extensively modified by human use, first by Māori for use as a pā and later by use as quarry and pasture land before finally having a water reservoir installed in its cone to supply the surrounding area. An additional, partially buried, water reservoir was built on the low southern side of the mountain in 1955. English oaks and pōhutukawa are the most common trees on the hill.

== History ==
The name Ōhinerau comes from Hinerau, a goddess of whirlwinds in Māori mythology. The name Mount Hobson comes from Captain William Hobson, the first Governor-General of New Zealand. Remuwera was originally the name of a pā site on the hill that was also utilised for sweet potato and food gardens. The name Remuwera means the burnt edge of a flax garment.

A water reservoir was constructed on the northwestern side of Ōhinerau / Mount Hobson in 1935, damaging the terracing of the pā.

In the 2014 Treaty of Waitangi settlement between the Crown and the Ngā Mana Whenua o Tāmaki Makaurau collective of 13 Auckland iwi and hapū (also known as the Tāmaki Collective), ownership of the 14 Tūpuna Maunga of Tāmaki Makaurau / Auckland, was vested to the collective, including the volcano officially named Ōhinerau / Mount Hobson. The legislation specified that the land be held in trust "for the common benefit of Ngā Mana Whenua o Tāmaki Makaurau and the other people of Auckland". The Tūpuna Maunga o Tāmaki Makaurau Authority or Tūpuna Maunga Authority (TMA) is the co-governance organisation established to administer the 14 Tūpuna Maunga. Auckland Council manages the Tūpuna Maunga under the direction of the TMA.

== Gallery ==
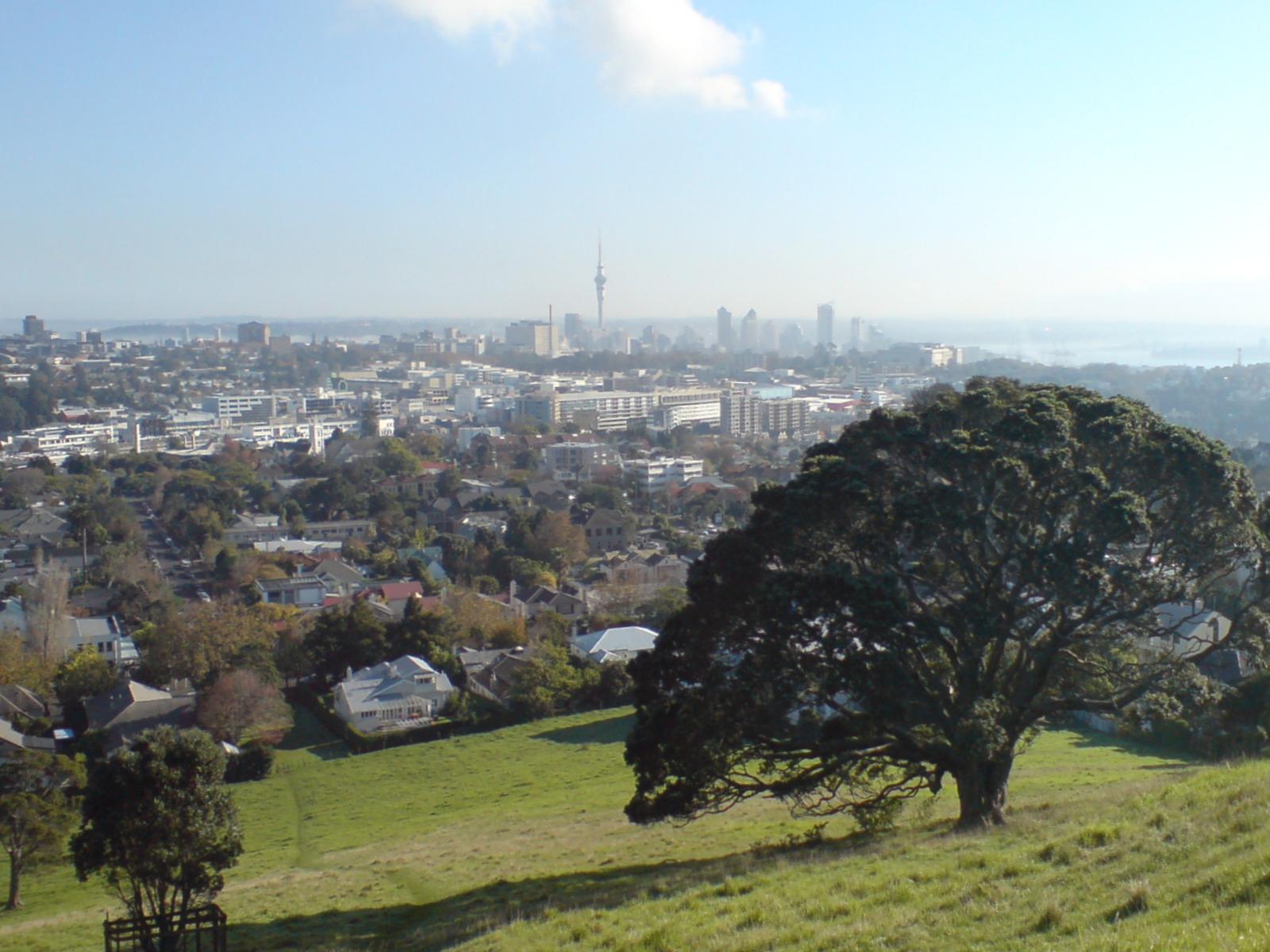
View looking northwest over Auckland City from the top of the mountain.

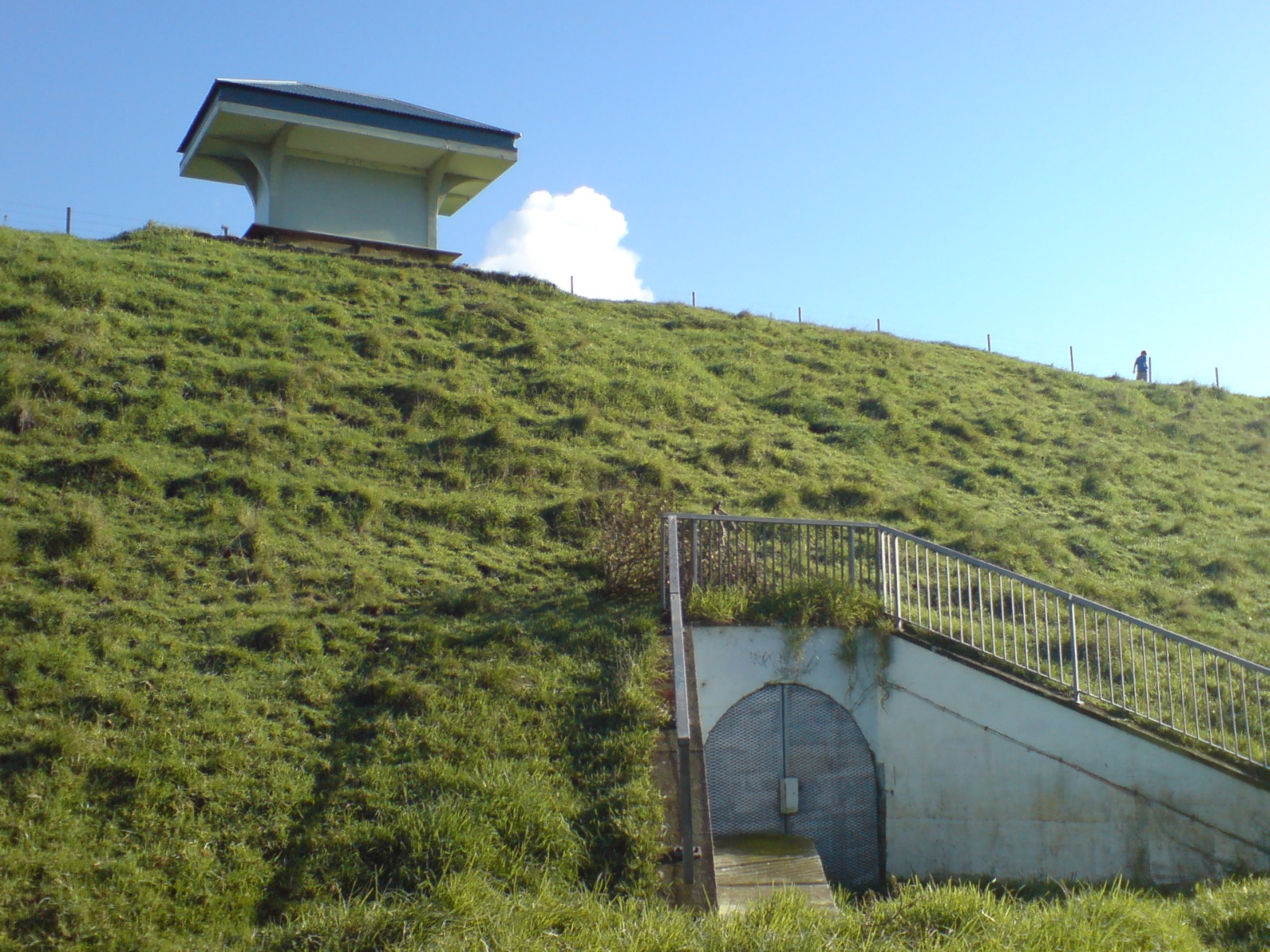
Showing the water reservoir installations at the top of the mountain.

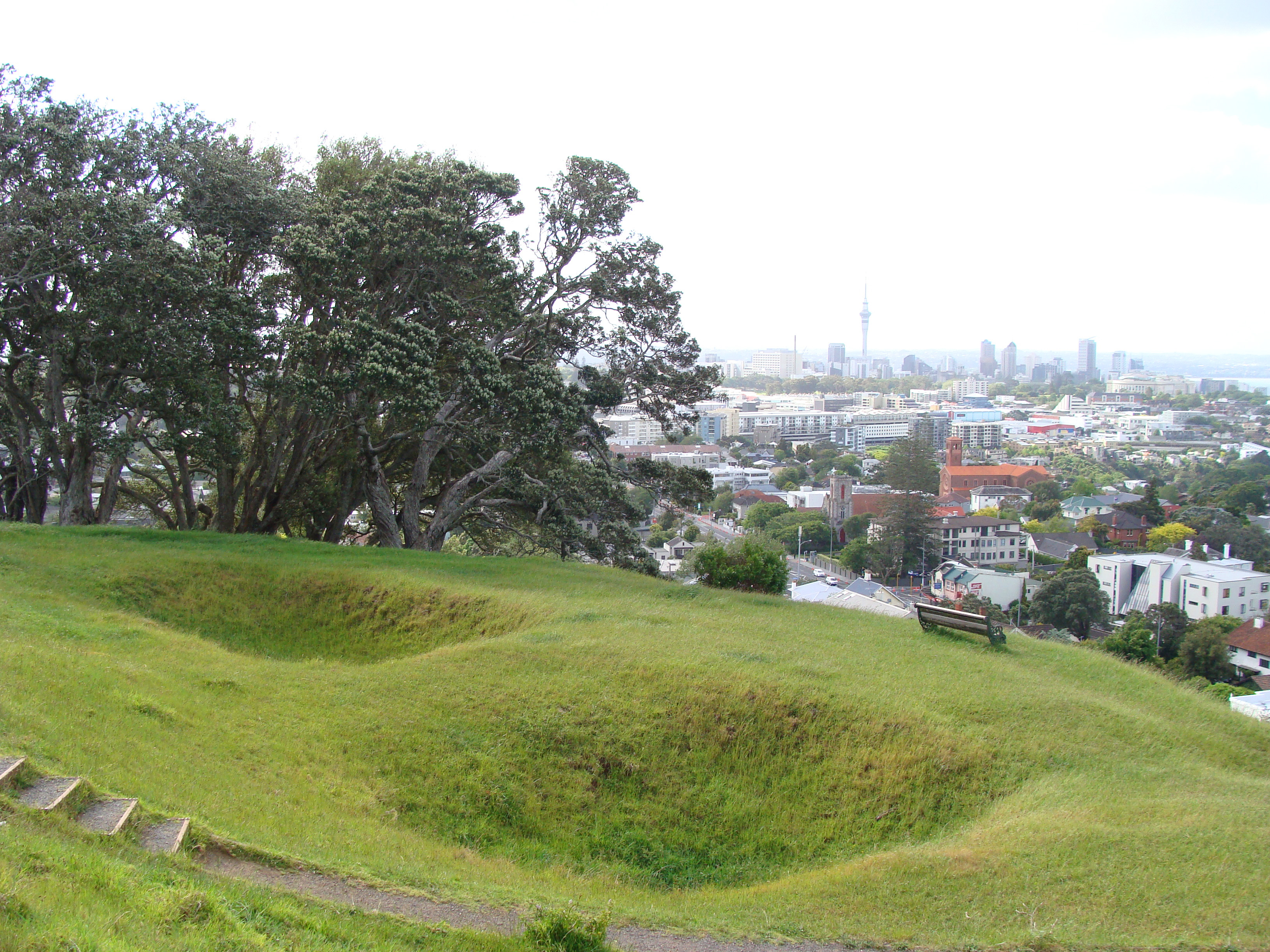
Kumara pits from when the hill was a Māori pā .
