= Kahupeka =

Māori healer in the 1400s

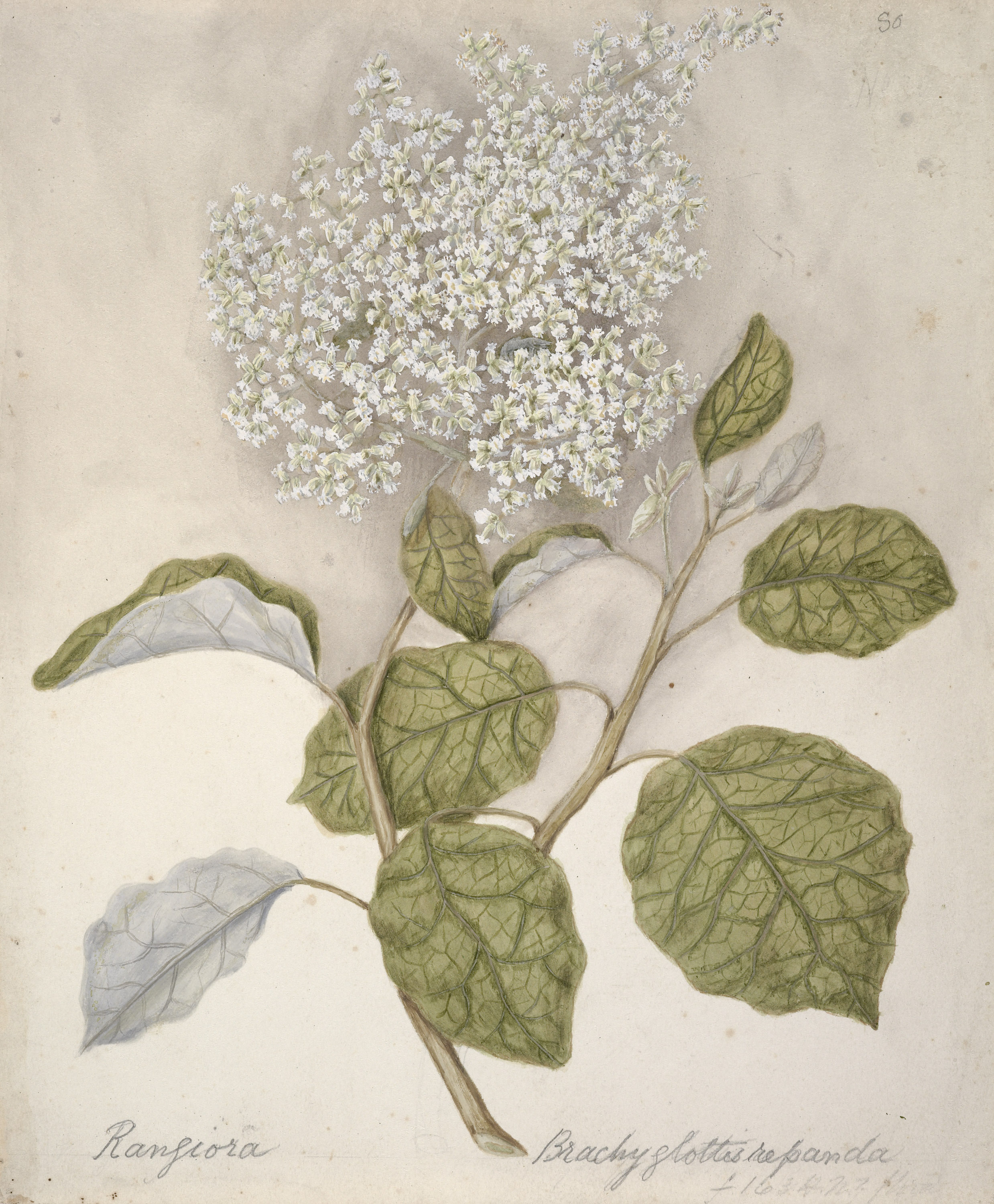
Rangiora, also known as the bushman's friend, as depicted by Sarah Featon

Kahupeka (sometimes referred to as Kahu, Kahupekapeka or Kahukeke) was a Māori healer in the 1400s who helped pioneer herbal medicine in New Zealand. She is remembered in oral history as a Tainui explorer who travelled the North Island, naming several locations and experimenting with herbal medicines.

== Life ==
Kahupeka's journey, according to Pei Te Hurinui Jones.
1 Karioi
2 Kāwhia
3 Mount Pirongia
4 Te Aroha
5 Whakamaru
6 Hurakia
7 Rangitoto
8 Pureora
9 Puke-o-kahu

According to Pei Te Hurinui Jones, Kahupeka was a daughter of Rangaiho, son of Hape, son of Ngare, son of Rakatāura, a tohunga of the Tainui waka and his wife Kahukeke, daughter of Hoturoa, leader of the Tainui waka. She grew up on Karioi and travelled to Kāwhia to marry Ue, the senior male-line descendant of Hoturoa (Jones gives the line of descent as Hoturoa, Hotuope, Hotuāwhio, Hotumatapū, Mōtai, Ue). Kahupeka had one son by Ue, Rakamaomao.

After Ue's death, she was grief-stricken and journeyed inland from Kāwhia. While travelling around the Waikato region, she is credited with naming many Waikato landscape features including Mount Pirongia and Te Aroha mountains. According to Jones, she first stopped at Mount Pirongia, which she called Pirongia-te-aroaro-o-Kahu ("Smelly-in-front-of-Kahu"). According to Tom Roa, she gave it this name because of symptoms of an illness that she was suffering from, which may have been the after-effects of a miscarriage. After this, she passed a stream which she named Manga-waero-o-te-aroaro-o-Kahu ("Creek-of-the-dog's-hair-apron-in-front-of-Kahu"), carried on to Te Aroha, which she named Te-Aroha-o-Kahu ("The Love of Kahu"). She decided to settle a little further south at a place that she named Te-Whakamaru-o-Kahu ("The Shelter of Kahu") and gathered the reeds for a house at Te-Whakakākaho-o-Kahu ("The reed-collecting-of-Kahu"), but the reeds were not good enough for building, so she carried on to the mountains west of Lake Taupō, which she named Hurakia-o-Kahu ("Exposing-of-Kahu"). She ran out of food at Maunga-pau-o-Kahu ("Mountain-of-the-starving-of-Kahu"), passed over Rangitoto-o-Kahu ("Bloody-sky-of-Kahu"), fell sick and recovered at Pureora-o-Kahu ("Recovery-of-Kahu") and finally settled and died at Puke-o-Kahu ("Hill-of-Kahu"). After this, her son Rakamaomao returned to Kāwhia. Some of these claims are disputed, with many believing that it was her son who named Mount Pirongia.

Stories suggest she experimented with native plants while attempting to treat her illness, specifically harakeke, koromiko, kawakawa, and rangiora.

According to Ranginui Walker, Kahupeka was the wife of the tohunga Rakatāura, a tohunga, who settled at Rarotonga / Mount Smart (i.e. the woman that Jones calls Kahukeke). In this version, Rakatāura gives Te Aroha its name after Kahupeka's death in Waikato, in honour of the love he felt for her.

== Recognition ==
In 2018, the Royal Society Te Apārangi named Kahupeka as one of the 150 women who made 'valuable contributions to expanding knowledge in Aotearoa/New Zealand'.

In August 2020, the Pūrākau children's series on Māori Television included an episode featuring Kahupeka.

== Bibliography ==
- Jones, Pei Te Hurinui; Biggs, Bruce (2004). Ngā iwi o Tainui : nga koorero tuku iho a nga tuupuna = The traditional history of the Tainui people. Auckland [N.Z.]: Auckland University Press. ISBN 1869403312.
- Walker, Ranginui (2004). "Nga Korero o Nehera". Ka Whawhai Tonu Matou - Struggle Without End (Second ed.). Auckland, New Zealand: Penguin Books. p. 46. ISBN 9780143019459.
