= Empire Media =

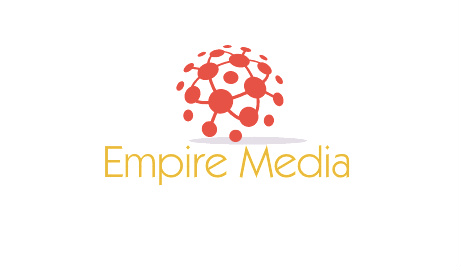
- Empire Media logo, March 2014
- Industry: Broadcasting
- Predecessor: Empire Christian Group
- Founded: Auckland, New Zealand (2012)
- Headquarters: Auckland, New Zealand
- Number of locations: 2 markets
- Area served: New Zealand
- Products: NZ Radio 1 News; Weekend Horizon; 7DayVlogs
- Services: TRUTH FM; RADIO X
- Website: empiremedianz.weebly.com

Empire Media is a privately owned New Zealand media division. It is the owner and operator of the NZ Radio 1 News service, internet radio stations TRUTH FM and RADIO X, YouTube channel, 7DayVlogs and Weekend Horizon. It reports news, records programming and operates 3 radio stations from headquarters in central Auckland and Tauranga.

== History ==
The company was founded in 2012, as the successor of long-running company TRUTH Group, which founded TRUTH FM, TODAY FM and U FM. A change in format to the stations of TRUTH Group also saw the need for a new company to take the stations to new levels of success. By mid-June 2012, TRUTH Group had phased out the TODAY FM brand, in a move to replace it with a new, more innovative brand, U FM, which targeted a slightly younger audience than its predecessor.

In February 2013, the company's newest station, U FM, dubbed "the home of remix" was replaced with top 40 station, TODAY FM, as the current station was no longer reaching the success the company had hoped for.

By 2013, Empire Media had become New Zealand's oldest Internet Corporate for internet radio stations and YouTube channels.

In March 2014 for its formal name review, Empire Media was chosen over Empire Christian Group due to the companies changing structure.

On May 19, Empire Media re-branded their TODAY station to RADIO X. It's a mix of both U FM & TODAY music.

== Radio networks operated by Empire Media ==
- TRUTH FM
- RADIO X
- NZ Radio 1

== Previous stations operated by Empire Media ==
- U FM - Dropped by Empire Media early 2013. Relaunched in July 2013 by rival network Unity Broadcasting Group
