= Maungawhau / Mount Eden =

Scoria cone in Auckland, New Zealand

Coordinates: 36.877°S 174.764°E

Maungawhau
- Mount Eden
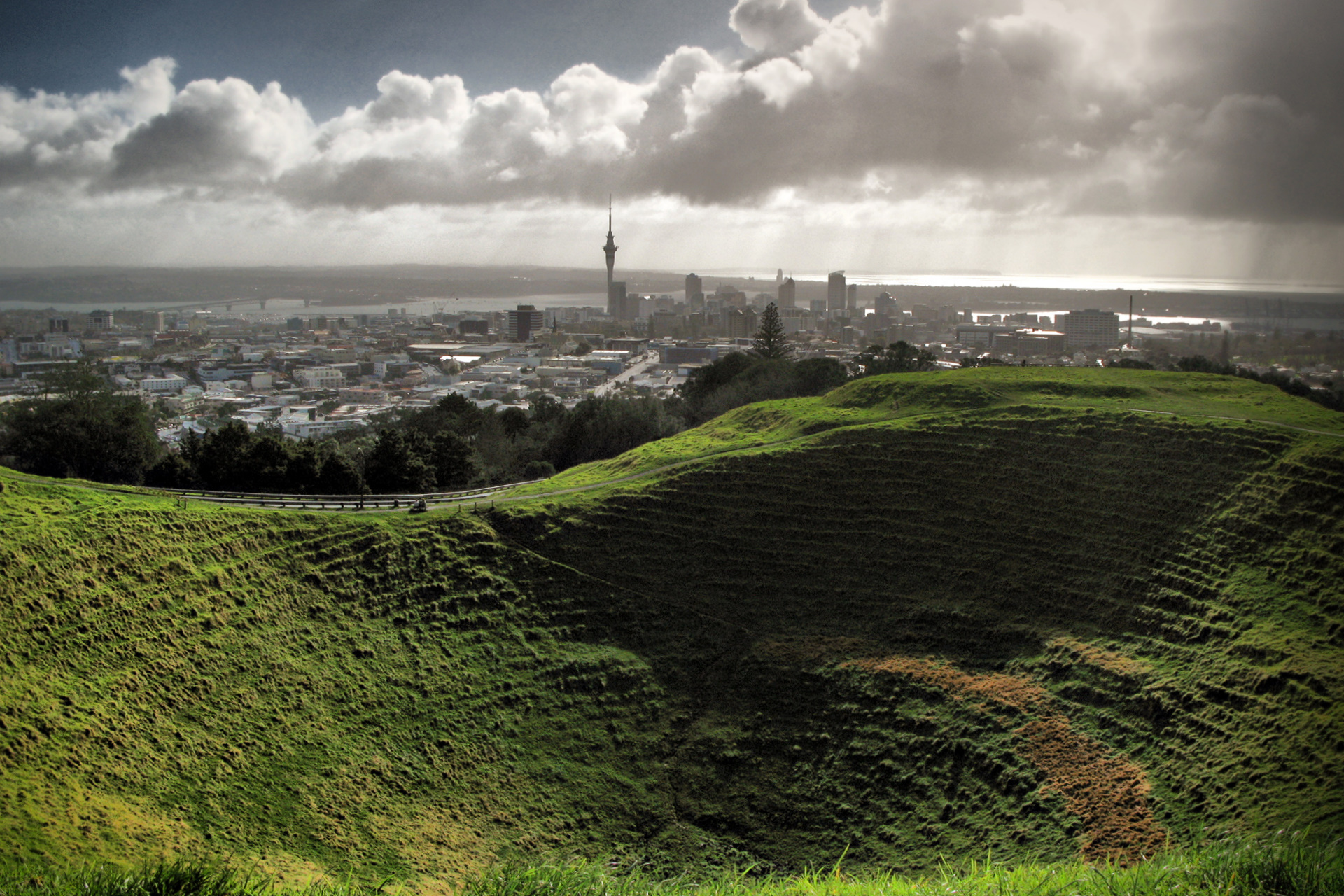
- Looking into and over the crater.

Highest point
- Elevation: 196 m (643 ft)

Geography
- Location: Auckland, North Island, New Zealand

Geology
- Volcanic field: Auckland volcanic field

Maungawhau / Mount Eden is a scoria cone and Tūpuna Maunga (ancestral mountain) in Mount Eden, Auckland, New Zealand. The cone is part of the Auckland volcanic field, the tallest located on the isthmus.

== Geography ==
The cone is a dormant volcano and its summit, at 196 metres (643 ft) above sea level, is the highest natural point on the Auckland isthmus. The majestic bowl-like crater is 50 metres (160 ft) deep. The volcano erupted from three craters 28,000 years ago, with the last eruptions from the southern crater filling the northern craters.

== Etymology ==
Maungawhau is a Māori-language name meaning 'mountain of the whau tree'. The name "Mount Eden" was chosen by Governor William Hobson, to honour George Eden, 1st Earl of Auckland, who was his superior naval officer. The crater is named Te Upu Kai a Mataaho ('the bowl of Mataaho'); Mataaho was a deity said to live in the crater and to be the guardian of the secrets hidden in the earth.

== History ==
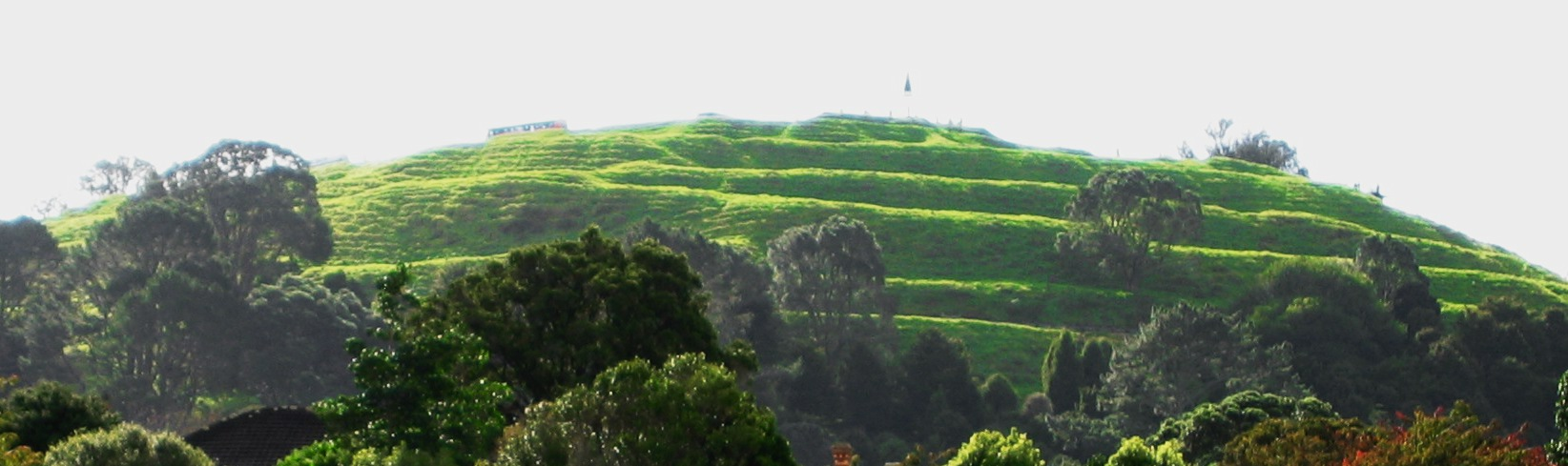
Terraces on the southern slopes of Maungawhau / Mount Eden

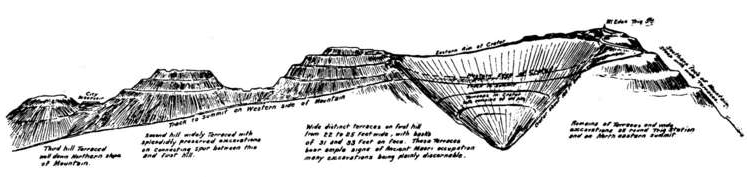
Diagram of Maungawhau's scoria cones and terracing by Elsdon Best (1927)

The Auckland isthmus has been settled by Tāmaki Māori since around the 13th or 14th centuries. Maungawhau was the principal pā settled by Huakaiwaka, the eponymous ancestor of Waiohua, and remained an important area for Waiohua from the 17th century to around the year 1740. Maungawhau was extensively terraced, and defensive ditches were created around four areas of the maunga. When Huakaiwaka's grandson Kiwi Tāmaki, he moved Waiohua's seat of power from Maungawhau to Maungakiekie. In the mid-18th century, Maungawhau became a part of the rohe of Ngāti Whātua.

In 1840, Ngāti Whātua gifted 3,000 acres (1,200 ha) of land on the Auckland isthmus to European settlers, in order to establish the new capital of Auckland. Maungawhau / Mount Eden was the southern point of this area. As late as the 1850s, four distinct terraces could be seen on the cone, which were obscured by vegetation or by quarrying. Mount Eden was managed by the Mount Eden Highway Board. In 1869 a road existed that provided access to the summit. Initially there was a right to depasture stock on Mount Eden, although by 1870 the highway board instituted fees for this right. The Mount Eden Domain Board was established in 1879 and was responsible for managing the mountain.

An underground water reservoir has been located on the northern side of Maungawhau / Mount Eden since the 1880s. The original reservoir was replaced in 1912, and a second, complementary, reservoir added in 1929. This reservoir resulted in the collapse of a 12-meter section of the reservoir wall, sending 800,000 gallons of water and rock, down the mountain causing significant damage to properties and blocking Mt Eden Road. The trig station at the summit was used as a reference point for drawing up Auckland's suburbs. The platform was built with help from Prince Alfred's elephant. The elephant was rewarded with lollies, buns and beer.

In the early 20th Century, stone was quarried by Mount Eden Prison inmates from Maungawhau / Mount Eden for use in road projects.

From the 1950s the peak was used by the New Zealand Post Office for VHF radio communications in two buildings, several hundred metres apart, each with their own antenna farm. One building housed transmitting equipment, while the other housed receiving equipment. In the 1960s the site was staffed during the five-day working week due to the large number of valves that wore out under the stress of high power and needed frequent servicing. Typical use of the facility was for businesses e.g. taxi or delivery firms needing mobile communications to vehicles.

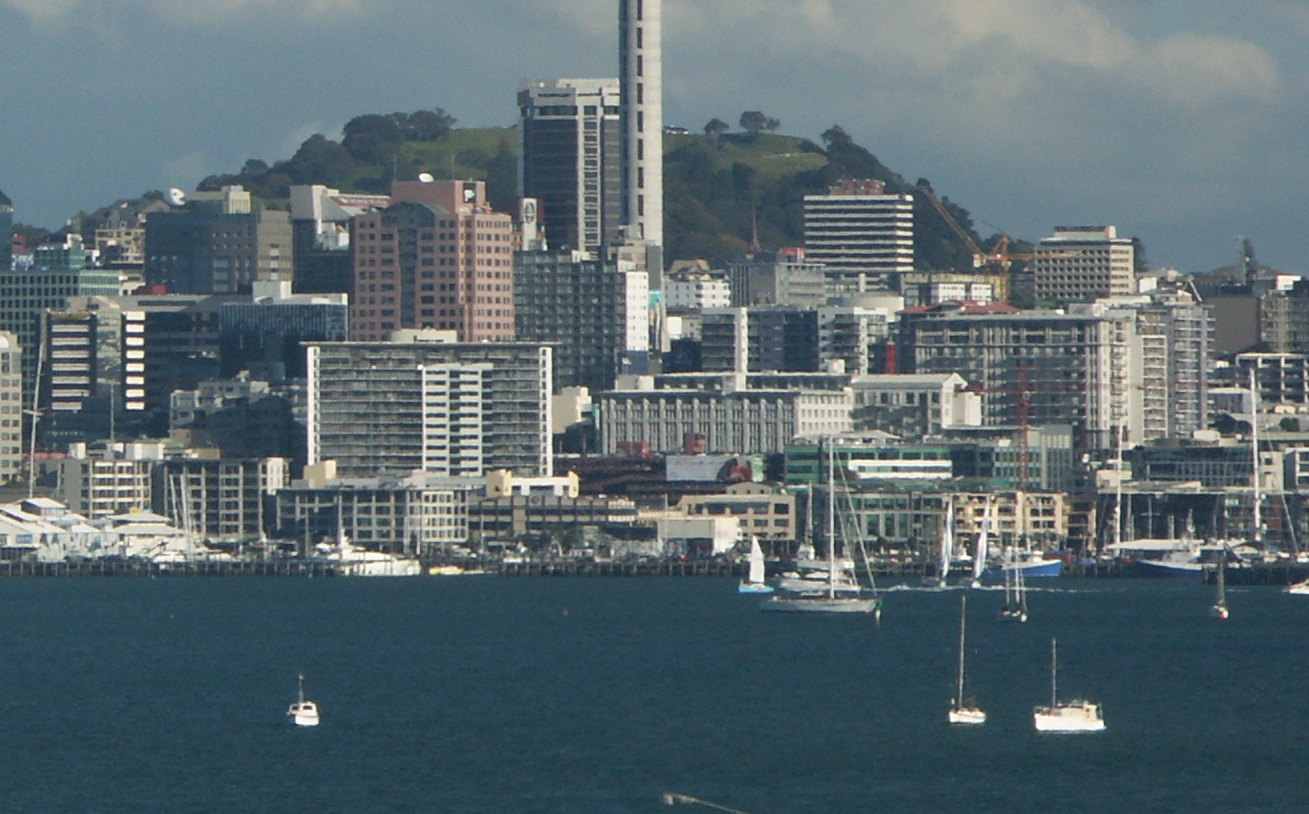
Mount Eden as seen through the city buildings, from Northcote.

In 1973, the crater of Maungawhau / Mount Eden was the venue for Mt Eden Crater Performance, a performance piece by artist Bruce Barber, which involved a blind art master and drummers. During the mid-1980s, artist Philip Dadson organised annual winter solstice celebrations in the crater.

Maungawhau / Mount Eden attracts many tourists, as it is the highest natural point in Auckland, and provides good views in all directions over the city. Due to the spiritual and cultural significance of the maunga to Māori, and for pedestrian safety, the summit road was permanently closed to most vehicles in 2011, with the exception of people with limited mobility.

=== Treaty settlement ===
In the 2014 Treaty of Waitangi settlement between the Crown and the Ngā Mana Whenua o Tāmaki Makaurau collective of 13 Auckland iwi and hapū (also known as the Tāmaki Collective), ownership of the 14 Tūpuna Maunga of Auckland, was vested to the collective, including the volcano officially named Maungawhau / Mount Eden. The legislation specified that the land be held in trust "for the common benefit of Ngā Mana Whenua o Tāmaki Makaurau and the other people of Auckland". The Tūpuna Maunga o Tāmaki Makaurau Authority or Tūpuna Maunga Authority (TMA) is the co-governance organisation established to administer the 14 Tūpuna Maunga. Auckland Council manages Mount Eden under the direction of the TMA.

In 2019, the 1926 Spanish Mission-style tearoom was converted into Whau Cafe and the Te Ipu Kōrero o Maungawhau / Mount Eden Visitor Experience Centre. The centre showcases the geological and Māori cultural history of the maunga. In 2020, boardwalks were opened around the crater rim, to protect the pā tūāpapa (terraces) and rua kūmara (kūmara storage pits) on the summit's upper slopes. Views from the boardwalk into the deep crater and over Auckland city are spectacular.

== Gallery ==
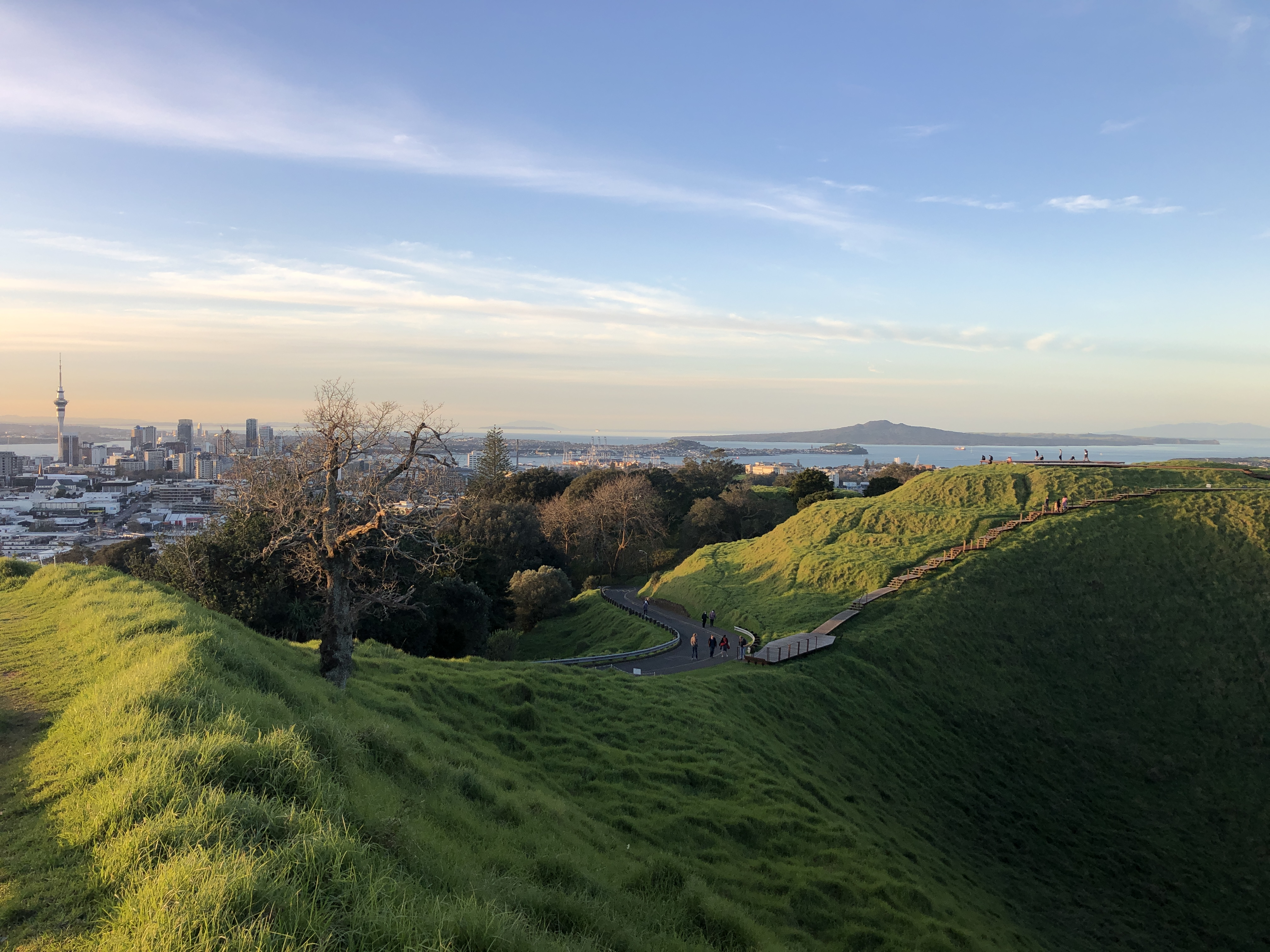
Boardwalk on the western side of the crater

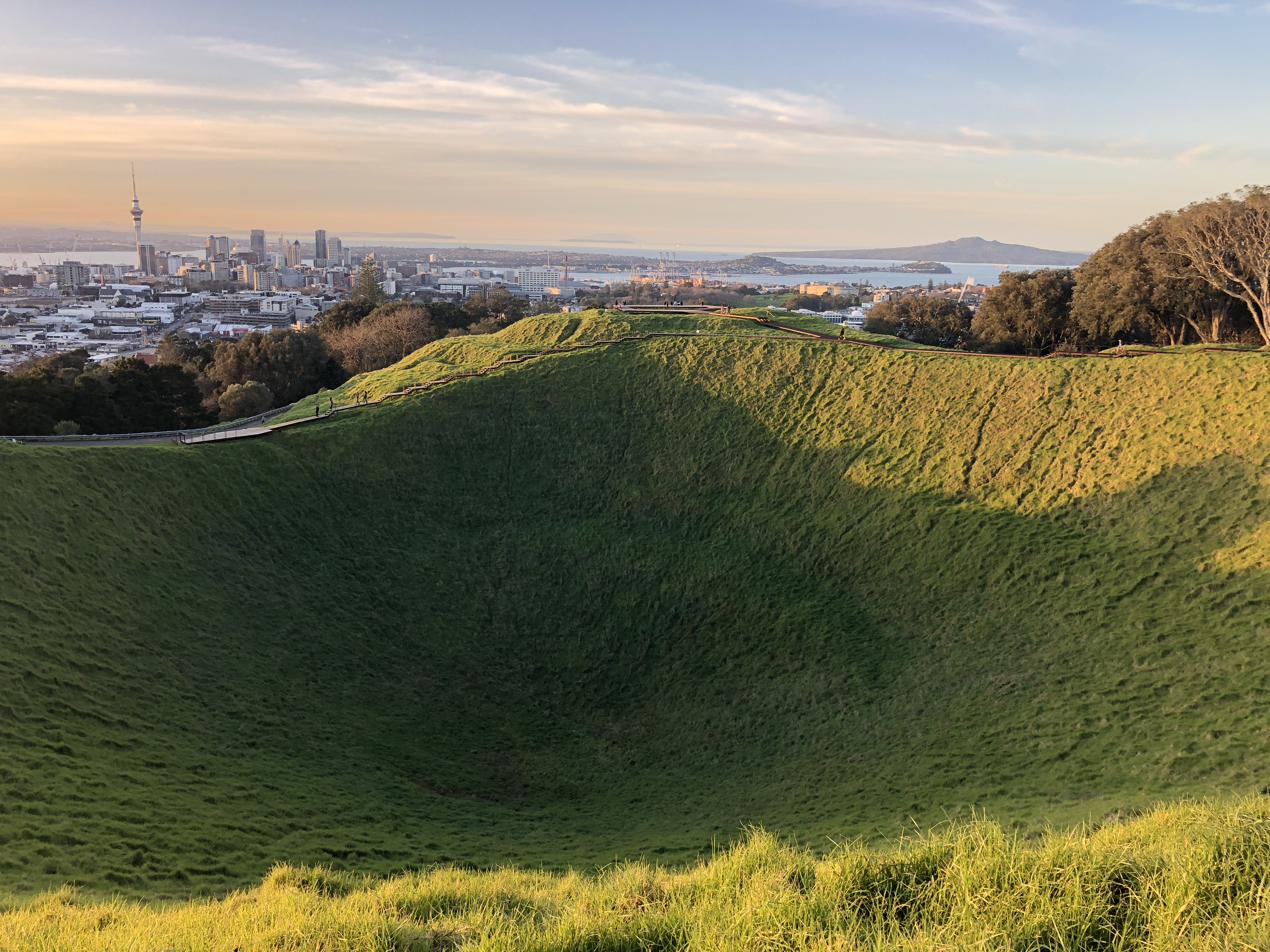
Boardwalk on the northern side of the crater

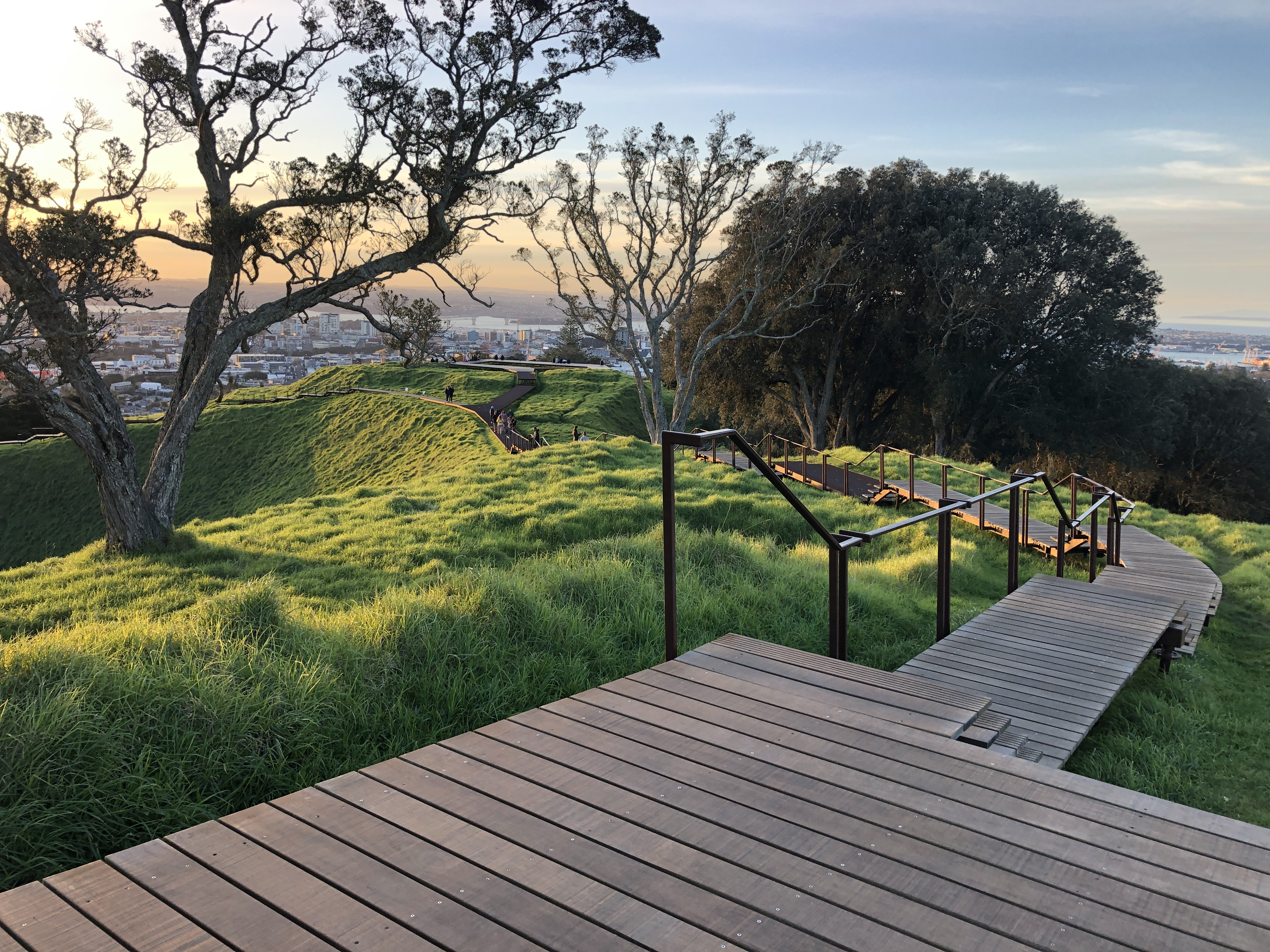
Boardwalk on the eastern side of the crater

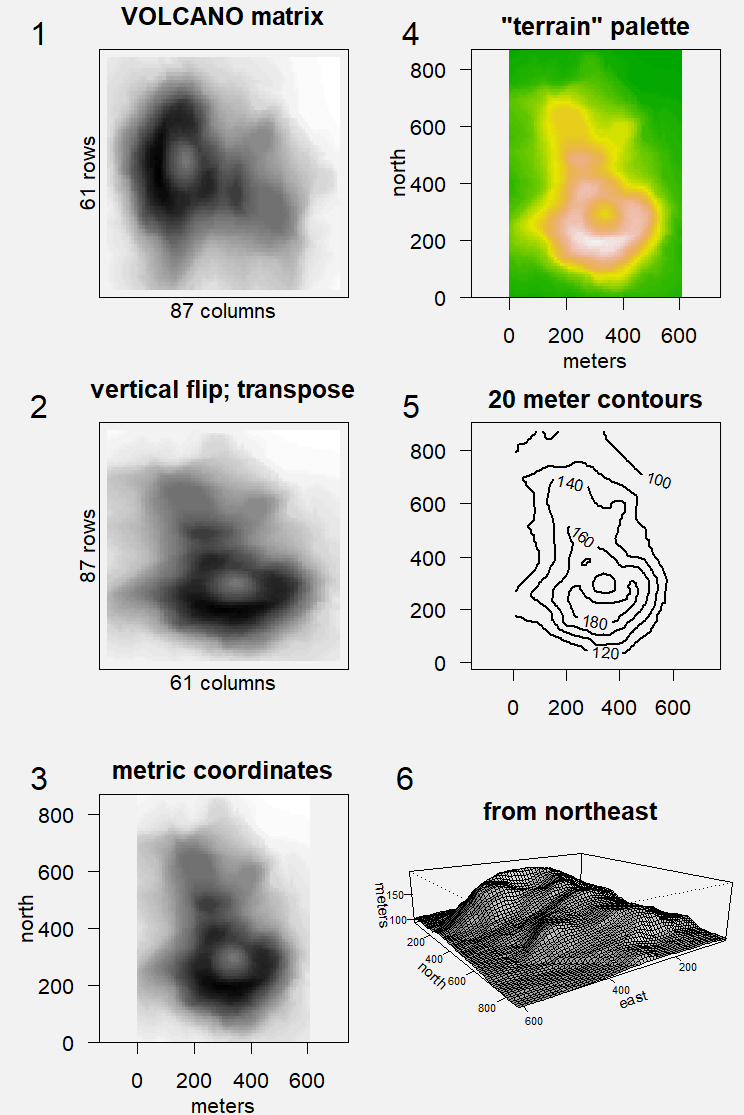
The volcano dataset from the R programming environment visualised, restructured, coloured, and georeferenced
