= Mike Smith (activist) =

New Zealand activist (born 1956/57)

Michael John Smith (born 1956/57) is a New Zealand environmental and Māori rights activist.

== Early life and family ==
Smith is Māori, and identifies with the Ngāpuhi and Ngāti Kahu iwi. He was born in the 1950s in New Zealand's Northland Region to a Māori father and Pākehā (European) mother.

== Climate activism ==
Smith's activism began in 1992, when he attended a Global Earth Summits on greenhouse gas emissions. In October 1994 he created headlines in New Zealand when he attacked the lone tree on Auckland's Maungakiekie / One Tree Hill with a chainsaw, an act aimed at emphasising Māori anger at the New Zealand government's latest economic policies. There was also a feeling among some Māori that the tree — an exotic species — was inappropriate and should be replaced by a native plant. The damage resulted in Smith being arrested and receiving nine months of periodic detention. Smith has since expressed some regret at the action, especially for those for whom the tree had personal significance.

In February 2024, Smith won the right to sue several major New Zealand companies over their alleged contributions to climate change. The case, Smith v Fonterra Co-operative Group Ltd, was a landmark case in New Zealand tort law. It parallels similar international moves to find judicial methods to speed up action on the environment. In May 2026, the New Zealand Government announced that it would amend existing climate legislation to prevent companies from being sued over damages caused by greenhouse gas emissions. The law change will affect Smith's 2024 lawsuit against the dairy giant Fonterra and five other major emitters.

In response, Smith accused the New Zealand government of engaging in a "coordinated campaign of secret lobbying, political interference and corporate influence at the highest levels of power." In late May 2026, Radio New Zealand reported that Justice Ministry officials had advised the Government not to intervene in Smith's court case. However, the Government had decided to disregard their advice, with Justice Minister Paul Goldsmith justifying the law change on the basis that Smith's case against "major corporate emitters" had undermined business confidence.

The Climate Change Response (Tort Liability) Amendment Act 2026 passed its third reading on 19 August 2026 and came into force on 25 August 2026. This stopped Smith's lawsuit and prevented future lawsuits in tort law against companies for climate-changing emissions.
