= Eden County =

Former county of New Zealand

- County of New Zealand
- 1876–1956
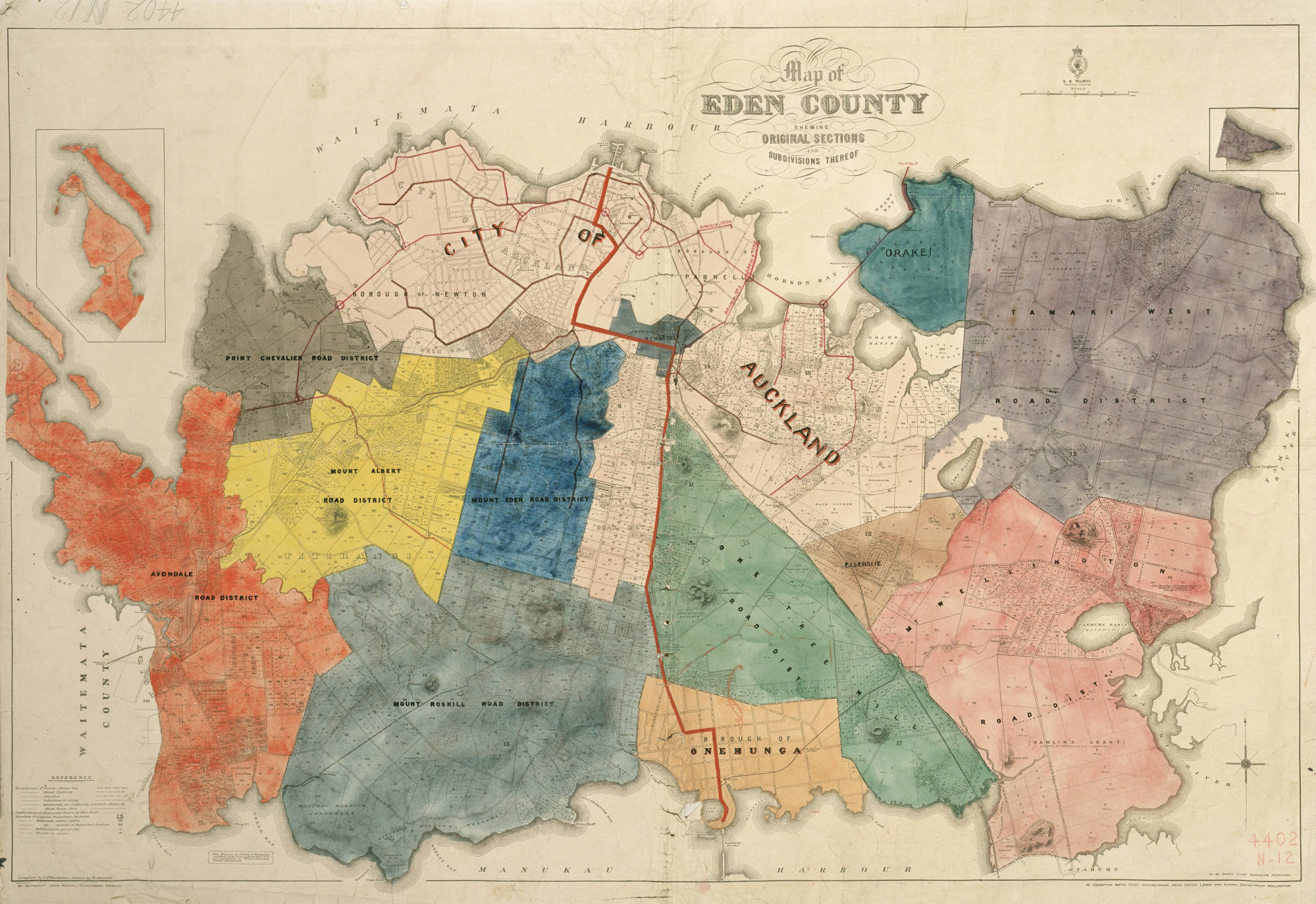
- Map of Eden County in 1914
- History
  - Established: 1876
  - Disestablished: 1956
- Today part of: Auckland Region

Eden County, was one of the counties of New Zealand. Established in 1876, the county covered the Auckland isthmus bar the City of Auckland. The county gradually shrunk in size as the area became more urban with suburban areas becoming part of the City of Auckland or independent boroughs. By 1956 the last part of Eden County was annexed by Auckland and the county ceased to exist.

== Geography ==
Prior to the establishment of Eden County a County of Eden was established in 1842 for land registration purposes, it had larger boundaries going up to the Tapora River (tributary of the Kaipara) and as far south as Papakura and including inner islands of the Hauraki Gulf (e.g. Waiheke Island). It was divided into six parishes: Waitemata, Titirangi, Takapuna, Pakuranga, Papakura, and Karaka. These parishes would form the basis of future local government boundaries in the area.

Eden County had smaller boundaries with the Whau and Tamaki portages serving as the boundary.

Eden County covered the Auckland isthmus from the Whau river as the northern/western boundary and Portage Road as the southern boundary.

== History ==
The County of Eden was established in 1842. This county was not used for any form of governance but instead for land registration. It was divided into six hundreds in 1848 by Governor William Hobson. The hundreds were replaced by the Highway Districts during the 1860s, instead the highway and road district boards controlled local government in the county.

In 1862, the Highways Act empowered local communities to form Road Boards and Highway Districts to administer areas, and by 1867 there were 20 highway districts in the area. Eden County was established with smaller boundaries than the County of Eden. Under the 1876 Counties Act a county was required to adopt the third schedule of the act to operate a county council. Eden County did not adopt this and went into abeyance without ever forming a permanent council.

The first boroughs to secede from Eden County were Parnell and Onehunga in 1877, followed by Newmarket and Newton (later renamed Grey Lynn Borough) in 1885. These boroughs were joined by Mount Eden in 1906, Avondale in 1922, One Tree Hill in 1930 and Ellerslie in 1938.

Eden County was abolished when the Auckland Domain was transferred to the City of Auckland on 1 April 1956.

== Ridings ==
In 1876 Eden County had 7 ridings: Whau, Newton, Grafton, Epsom, Onehunga, Parnell, and Tamaki. The ridings were obsolete after the first election as the county council did not adopt the third schedule of the Counties Act; however, they continued to be used for census purposes until 1951.

== See also ==
- List of former territorial authorities in New Zealand § Counties
