= Richard Abbott (architect) =

New Zealand architect (1883–1954)

- Born: Richard Atkinson Abbott; 6 January 1883; Auckland, New Zealand
- Died: 20 May 1954 (aged 71); Auckland, New Zealand
- Occupation: Architect
- Buildings: King's College Chapel
- Projects: Auckland Grammar School

Richard Atkinson Abbott (6 January 1883 – 20 May 1954) was a New Zealand architect. He was born in Auckland, New Zealand. He designed the obelisk on One Tree Hill in 1941. His work on the main building at Auckland Grammar School is an early example of the usage of the Spanish Mission style in New Zealand and was listed as a Historic Place Category 1 in 1988 by Heritage New Zealand. He also designed the heritage-listed chapel at King's College in Auckland. He is buried at Purewa Cemetery.
