= Maungakiekie / One Tree Hill =

Hill in Auckland, New Zealand

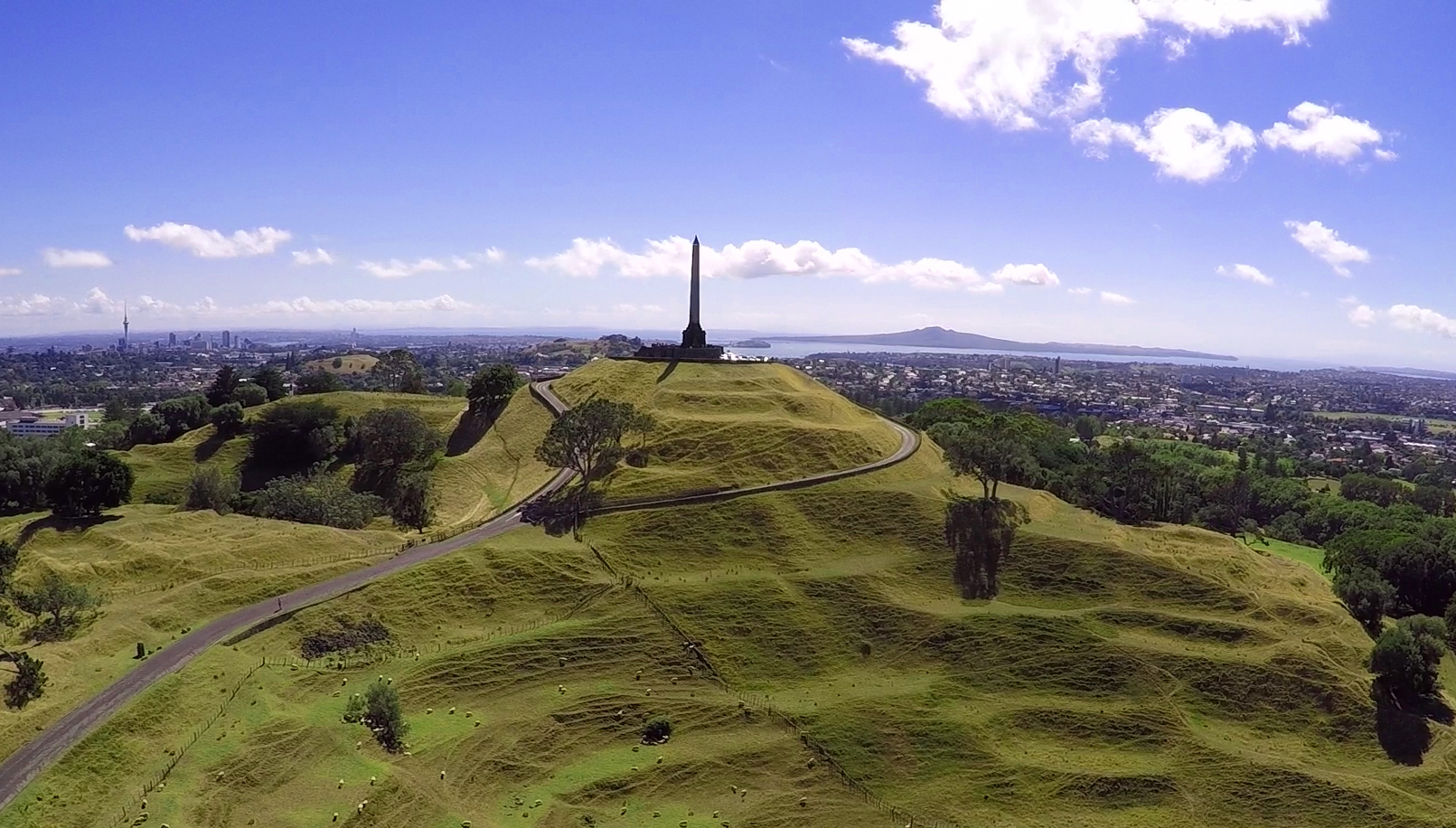
- Maungakiekie / One Tree Hill, in 2015.

Highest point
- Elevation: 182 m (597 ft)
- Coordinates: 36°54′0″S 174°46′59″E

Geography
- Location: North Island, New Zealand

Geology
- Rock age: About 67,000 years
- Volcanic field: Auckland volcanic field

Maungakiekie / One Tree Hill is a 182-metre (597 ft) volcanic peak and Tūpuna Maunga (ancestral mountain) in Auckland, New Zealand. It is an important place culturally and archeologically for both Māori and Pākehā. The suburb around the base of the hill is also called One Tree Hill. It is surrounded by the suburbs of Royal Oak to the west, and clockwise, Epsom, Greenlane, Oranga, and Onehunga. The summit provides views across the Auckland area, and allows visitors to see both of Auckland's harbours.

The scoria cones of the hill were erupted from three craters – one is intact and two have been breached by lava flows that rafted away part of the side of the scoria cone. Lava flows went in all directions, many towards Onehunga, covering an area of 20 square kilometres (7.7 sq mi), making it the second largest (in area covered) of the Auckland volcanic field, behind Rangitoto Island. The volcano erupted approximately 67,000 years ago.

== History ==
=== Tāmaki Māori history ===
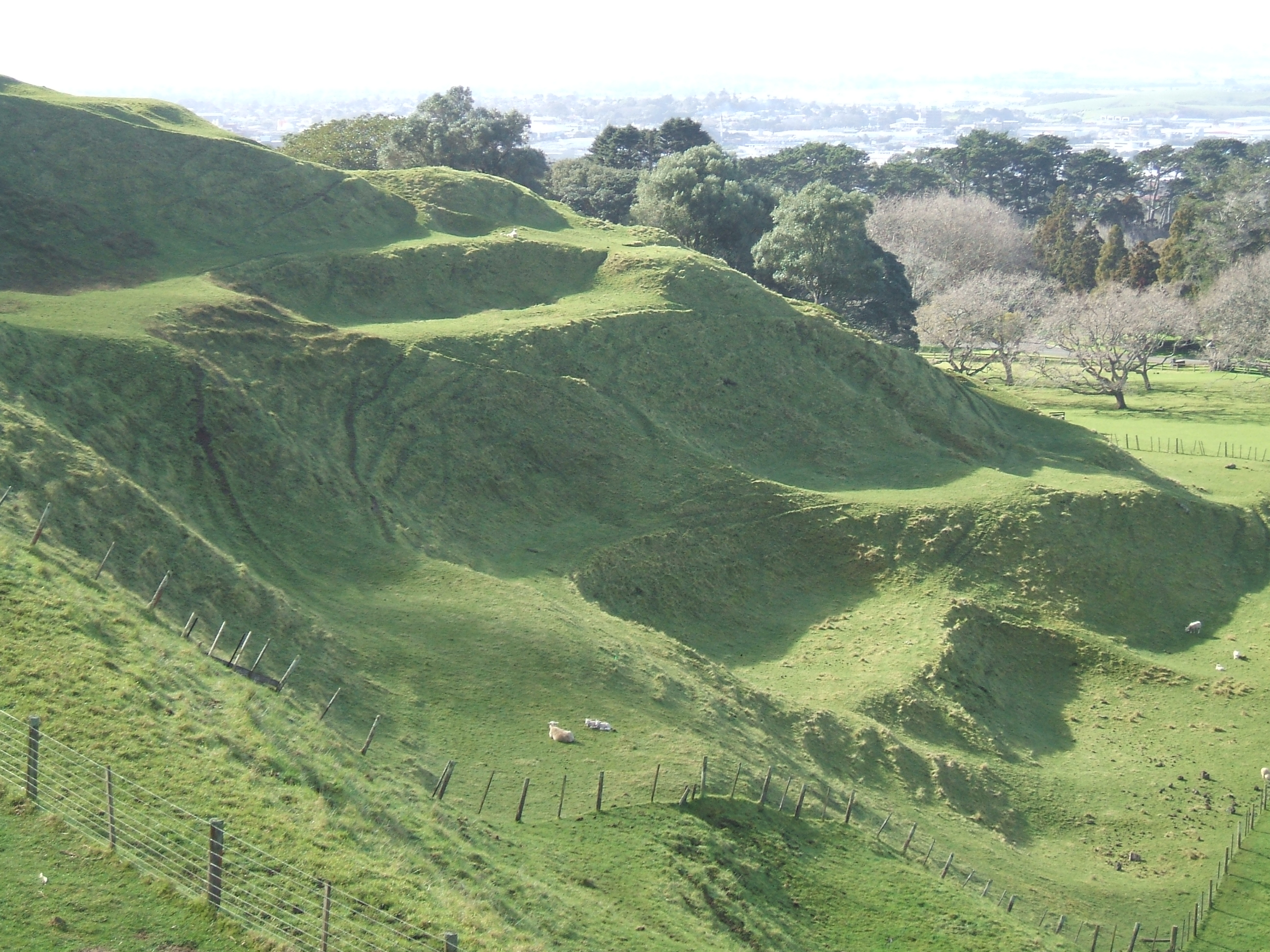
Terracing on a slope of Maungakiekie / One Tree Hill

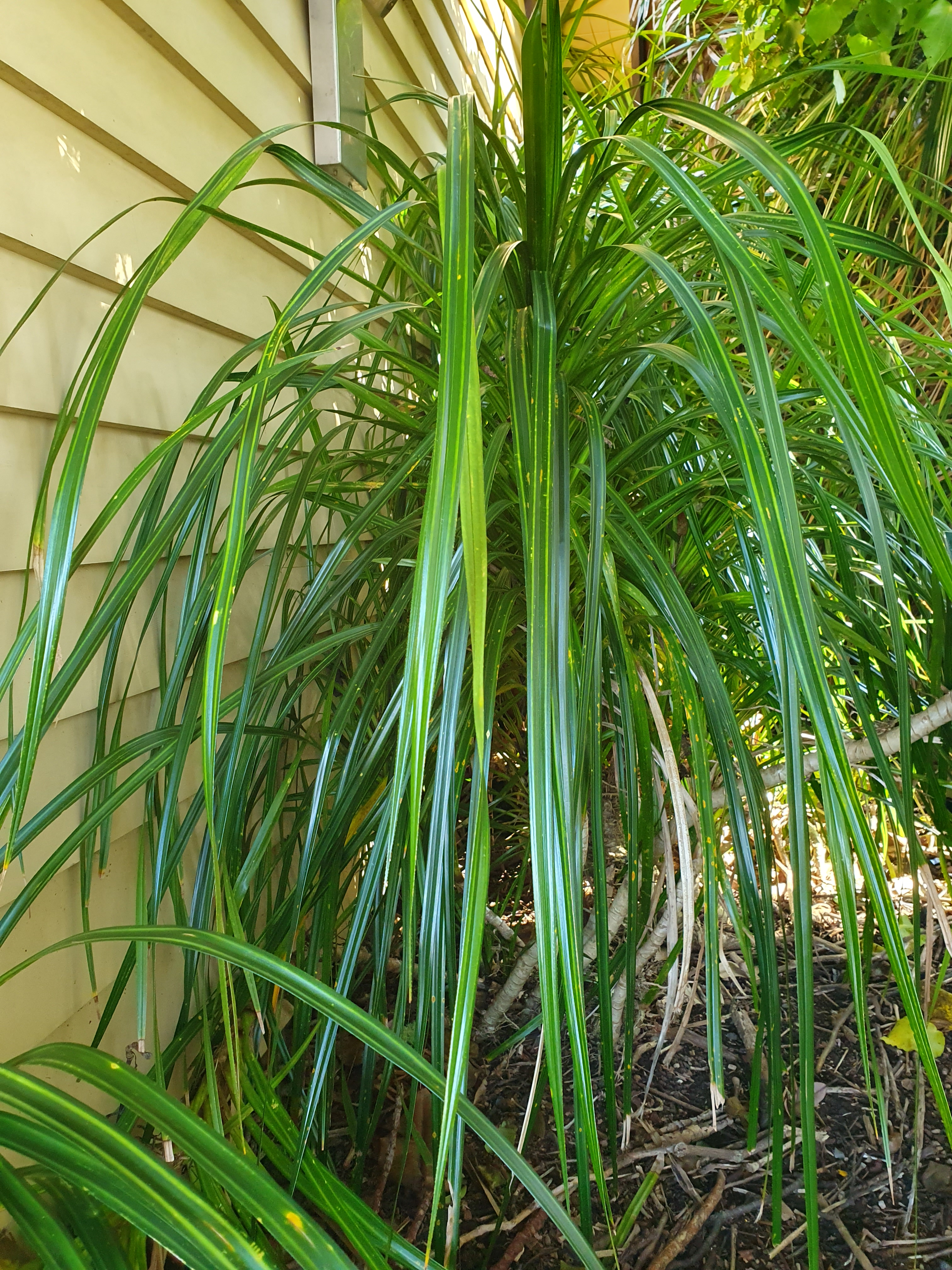
Kiekie (Freycinetia banksii) specimen on Maungakiekie / One Tree Hill

In pre-European times, Maungakiekie / One Tree Hill was the largest pā on the Auckland isthmus. The Māori name Maungakiekie means "mountain of the kiekie vine". The terraces of the pā were constructed by Ngāti Awa chief Tītahi in the 17th century, and were traditionally known as Ngā Whakairo a Tītahi (the carvings of Tītahi).

The tihi (summit) of the maunga was where the umbilical cord of Ngāti Awa rangatira Korokino was buried and a tōtara tree sprig was planted on top, giving rise to the name Te Tōtara-i-āhua ("The Tōtara That Stands Alone"), another common name for the mountain used by Tāmaki Māori.

Maungakiekie / One Tree Hill is associated with the Waiohua confederation of tribes, who were active in the 17th and 18th centuries. The time of the third paramount chief of Waiohua, Kiwi Tāmaki, is associated with the time of the greatest unity and strength of the Waiohua confederation, when the Tāmaki Makaurau region was one of the most populated areas of Aotearoa. The cone and its surroundings are estimated to have been home to a population of up to 5,000. Kiwi Tāmaki, the third paramount chief of Waiohua, moved the seat of power of the confederation from Maungawhau / Mount Eden to Maungakiekie / One Tree Hill. Near the summit of Maungakiekie / One Tree Hill was a gigantic pahū pounamu (greenstone gong) known as Whakarewa-tāhuna ("Lifted from the Banks of the Sea"), which Kiwi Tāmaki used to call for the warriors of the Tāmaki isthmus to assemble. During the later Waiohua period, the southern slopes of Maungakiekie / One Tree Hill south to Onehunga were known as Nga Māra a Tahuri ("The Plantations of Tahuri"), which were extensive kūmara (sweet potato) plantations managed by Tahuri, an agriculturalist and wife of Waiohua chief Te Ika-maupoho. Kiwi Tāmaki and most of the people of Maungakiekie / One Tree Hill did not live permanently at the mountain, instead migrating across circuits of the Auckland region collecting resources.

Kiwi Tāmaki's rule and the Waiohua hegemony over the Tāmaki isthmus came to an end in the 1740s, after war with the Te Taoū hapū of Ngāti Whātua from South Kaipara. After the war, Te Taoū settled on the isthmus, and chief Tuperiri constructed a pā below the summit of Maungakiekie / One Tree Hill, known as Hikurangi. Hikurangi was abandoned around 1795 AD, with the death of Tuperiri, and Ngāti Whātua re-centred their activities around the Onehunga-Māngere area. While Maungakiekie / One Tree Hill was no longer central to Ngāti Whātua life, it remained a central part of the iwi's rohe.

=== European history ===
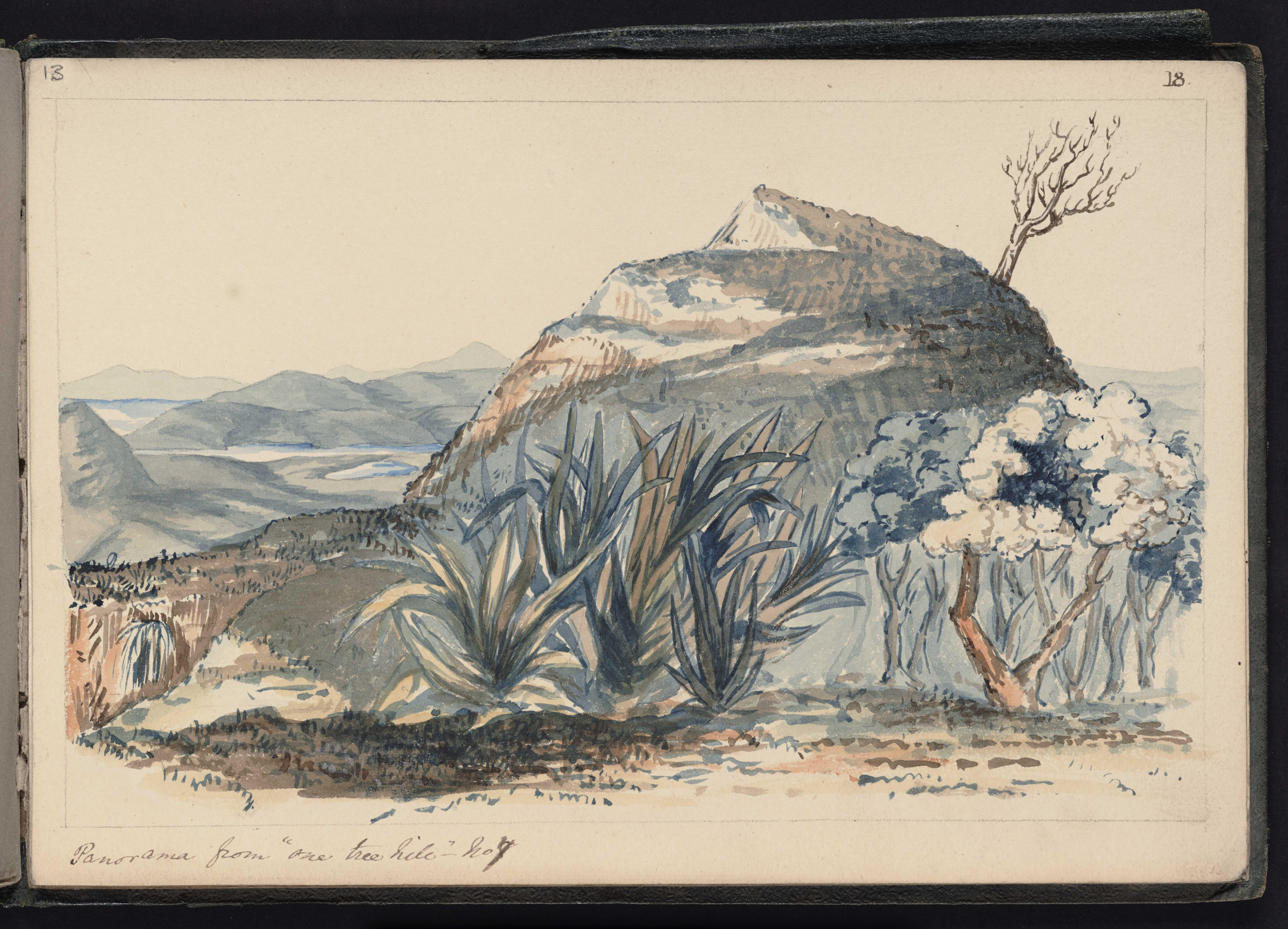
1845 watercolour the summit of Maungakiekie / One Tree Hill, with its single pōhutukawa or tōtara tree, that gave the mountain its English name.

In 1844, Ngāti Whātua chiefs sold a block of land which included Maungakiekie / One Tree Hill to a merchant, Thomas Henry. Most of this property was removed from Henry's ownership in 1847, with the 115 acres of the hill and surrounding land becoming a Crown reserve, now known as the One Tree Hill Domain. In 1853, Auckland businessmen John Logan Campbell and William Brown purchased the Henry's remaining land. Henry had referred to his property as Mt Prospect, however after the purchase Campbell renamed the farm the One Tree Hill Estate. Over the next 20 years, the farm was developed for cattle and sheep farming, and included potato cultivations. During this period, Campbell and Brown spent most of their time in Europe.

In 1874, Campbell returned to Auckland and took sole ownership of the property, planning to build an Italian-style mansion adjacent to the mountain. Campbell's wife Emma did not approve of the designs or location, so by 1876 abandoned plans for the villa. In 1878, he planted an olive grove at Maungakiekie / One Tree Hill, the only commercial olive grove in New Zealand until the 1980s.

In 1880, after the death of his daughter Ida, Campbell decided to gift the One Tree Hill Estate to the public, leasing the land to Chinese market gardener Fong Ming Quong in the mean-time. In 1901, Campbell formally handed over the land to the public during the visit of the Duke and Duchess of Cornwall in 1901 (who later became King George V and Queen Mary of Teck).

=== One Tree Hill Domain ===
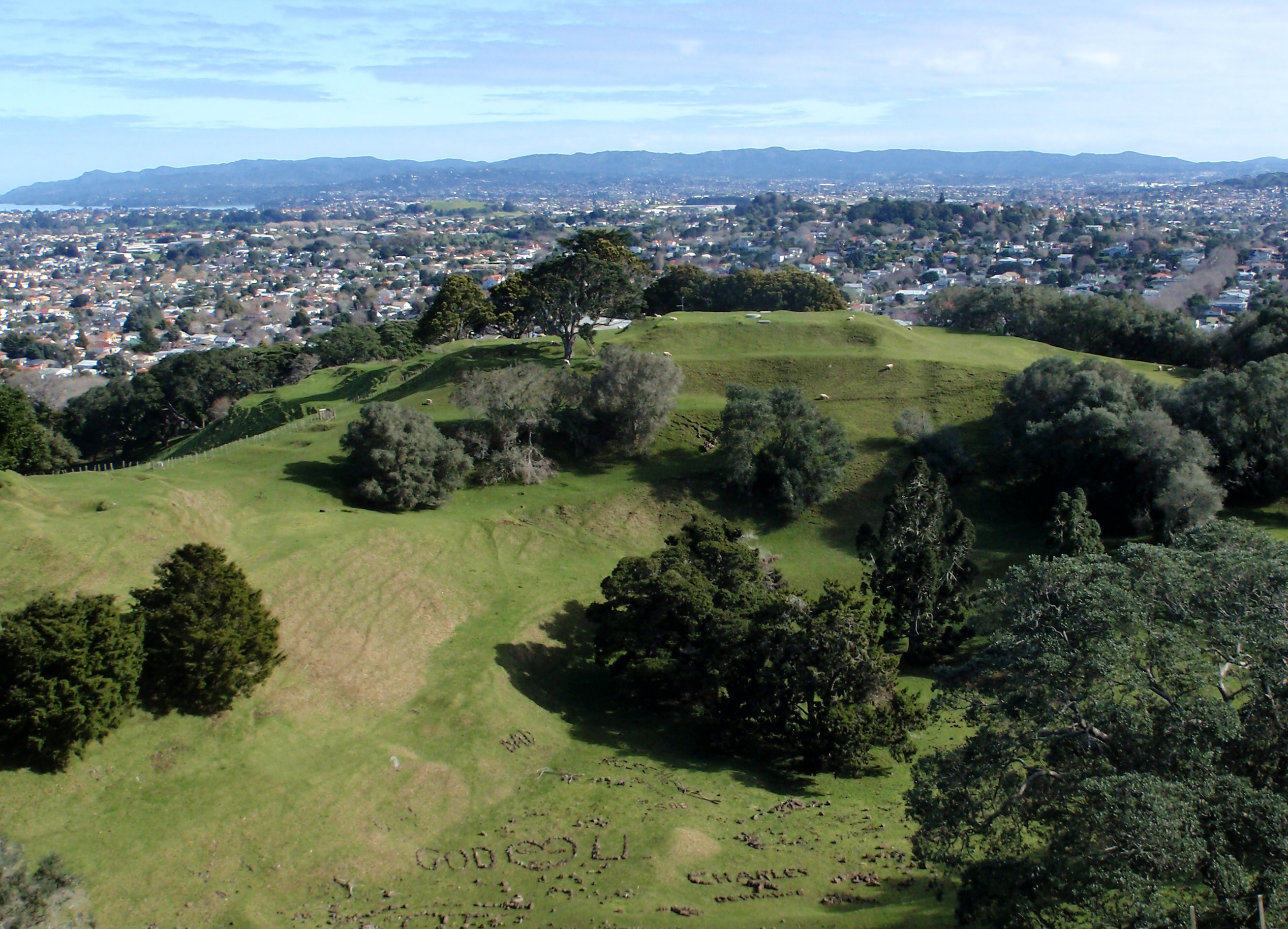
Crater of Maungakiekie / One Tree Hill, with Auckland city in the background.

One Tree Hill Domain, a 118-acre (48 ha) park, is owned by the Ngā Mana Whenua o Tāmaki Makaurau Collective (also known as the Tāmaki Collective) and administered by the Tūpuna Maunga o Tāmaki Makaurau Authority (Tūpuna Maunga Authority). One Tree Hill Domain adjoins Cornwall Park's 425 acres (172 ha), creating a total of 540 acres (220 hectares) of public green space.

Because of anti-social behaviour, including drinking, vandalism and crime, after-dark road access to the summit was closed in 2008.

Due to the spiritual and cultural significance of Maungakiekie / One Tree Hill to Māori, and for pedestrian safety, the summit road was permanently closed to most vehicles in March 2019.

The area contains two parks, One Tree Hill Domain and Cornwall Park, which are next to each other and thus often perceived as one. One Tree Hill Domain is open to the public and was formerly administered by Auckland City Council but since 2012 has been owned and administered by the Tūpuna Maunga Authority. All decisions are made by the owners, who have delegated minor day-to-day operations to Cornwall Park Trust. Cornwall Park is a private park, also open to the public, administered by the Cornwall Park Trust Board. The Trust's endowment includes income from leasehold properties adjoining the park's borders.

Because One Tree Hill Domain is high and relatively central, the city has long used it for its potable water reservoirs. The first of these was constructed in 1900 atop the western peak; though it is no longer in service, the small structure remains in place. Five further reservoirs were subsequently built underground, with the latest completed in 1977. These were built at such a height to enable them to be easily connected with similar reservoirs at Maungawhau / Mount Eden.

=== Cornwall Park ===
Cornwall Park, which adjoins the One Tree Hill Domain, was given by Sir John Logan Campbell to a private trust he had established to hold the land for the use of the public.

=== Treaty settlement ===
In the 2014 Treaty of Waitangi settlement between the Crown and the Ngā Mana Whenua o Tāmaki Makaurau collective of 13 Auckland iwi and hapū (also known as the Tāmaki Collective), ownership of the 14 Tūpuna Maunga of Tāmaki Makaurau / Auckland, was vested to the collective, including the volcano officially named Maungakiekie / One Tree Hill. The legislation specified that the land be held in trust "for the common benefit of Ngā Mana Whenua o Tāmaki Makaurau and the other people of Auckland". The Tūpuna Maunga o Tāmaki Makaurau Authority or Tūpuna Maunga Authority (TMA) is the co-governance organisation established to administer the 14 Tūpuna Maunga. Auckland Council manages the Tūpuna Maunga under the direction of the TMA.

== Features ==
=== Obelisk ===
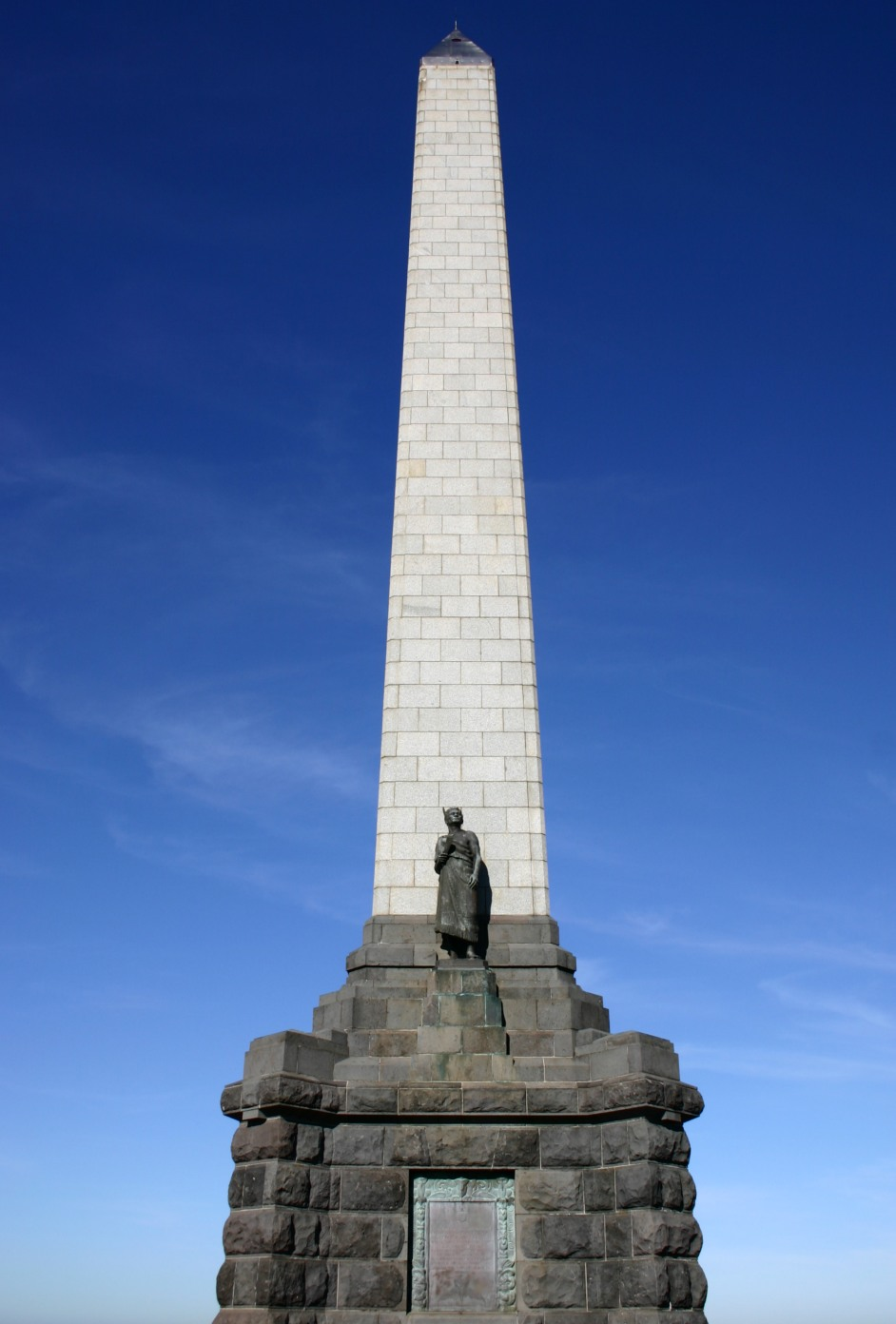
Detail of the obelisk

On the summit of the hill is an obelisk, a memorial to Māori. Before the obelisk stands a bronze statue of a Māori warrior. The stone obelisk was designed by Richard Abbott and completed in 1940, but the unveiling of the obelisk was delayed until after World War II on 24 April 1948. This was in keeping with Māori custom of not holding such ceremonies during a time of bloodshed.

Beneath it is the grave of Sir John Logan Campbell who bequeathed £5,000 for the obelisk. His grave is a plain granite slab, ornamented only by a bronze wreath. It lies in the middle of the viewing platform, on axis with the main memorial plaques on the Obelisk base and the bronze Warrior Statue.

Campbell, like many European New Zealanders of his generation, had expected that Māori would gradually die out and that an impressive memorial would be a most fitting symbol to perpetuate their memory. By the 1930s this had obviously not happened, and some considered the term "memorial" was inappropriate with many Māori objecting to its use. During construction of the obelisk, a suggestion was made that it should be described as a centennial tower to mark the centennial year of the signing of the Treaty of Waitangi and not a memorial.

=== Stardome Observatory ===
The Stardome Observatory (previously known as Auckland Observatory), is located within One Tree Hill Domain, and contains two telescopes and a planetarium. The observatory has, amongst other research, discovered and named the asteroid 19620 Auckland. Its current functions combine entertainment and education (via the planetarium and via public access to the older telescope) as well as ongoing research with both telescopes. It is operated by a charitable trust.

== Summit trees ==
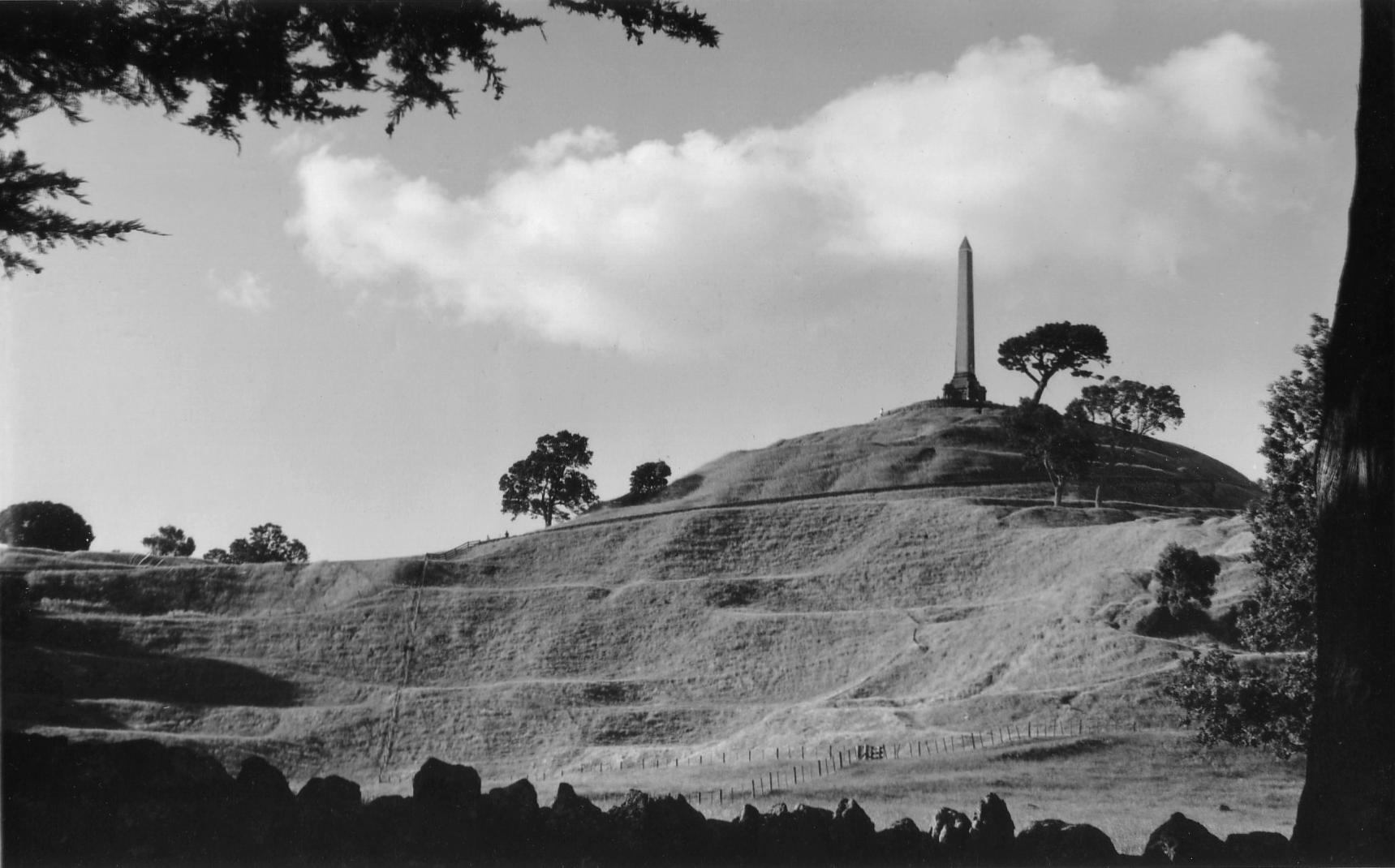
Maungakiekie / One Tree Hill with the lone Monterey pine tree, in 1996.

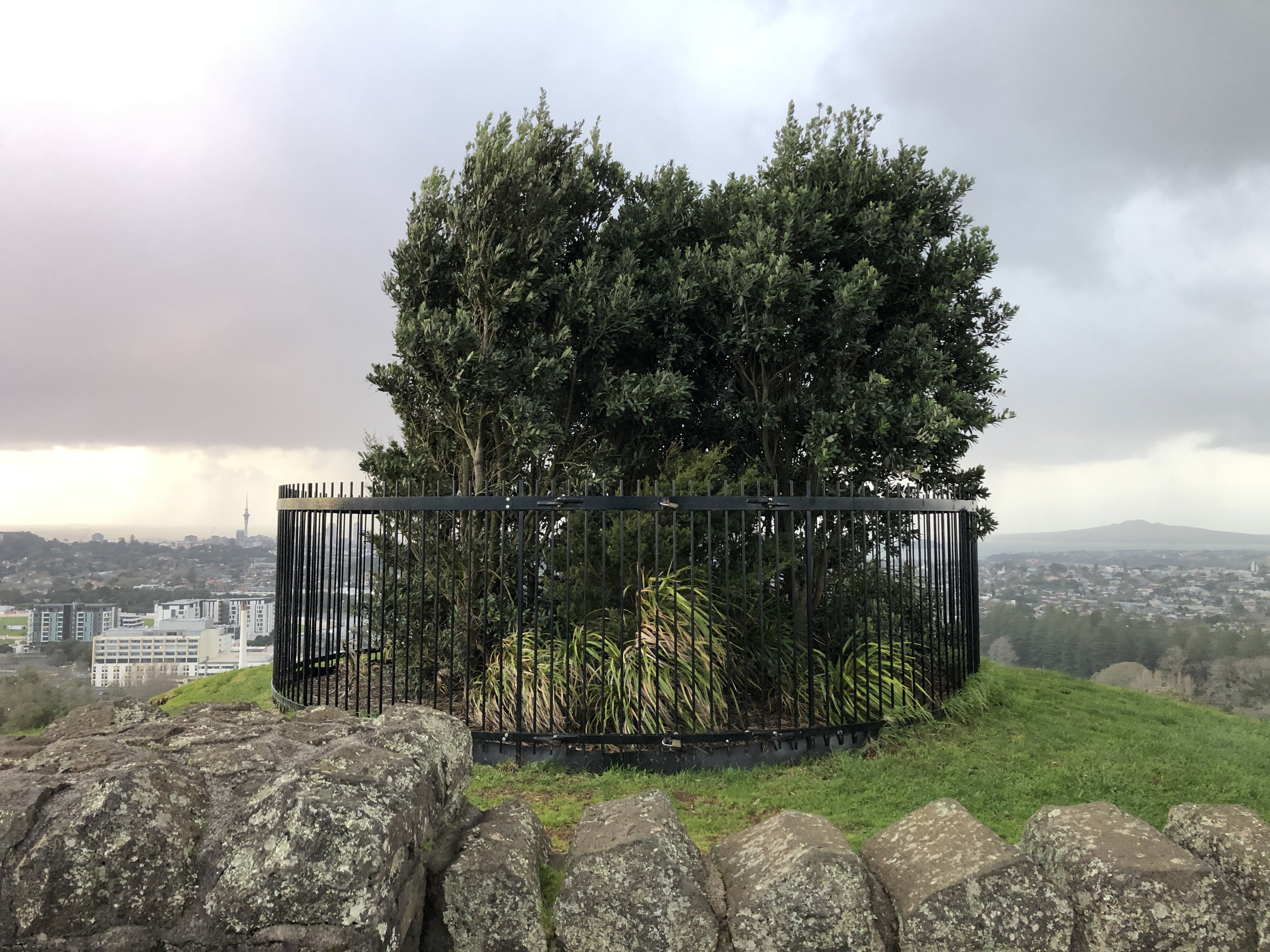
Young tōtara and pōhutukawa on Maungakiekie / One Tree Hill to replace lost single trees, 2022.

During the Waiohua confederation of the 17th and 18th century, the summit of the maunga was known for its single tōtara tree.

When Auckland was founded as a colonial town a tree stood near the tihi which gave the maunga its English name. Two accounts identify it as a pōhutukawa (Metrosideros excelsa). This tree was cut down by a Pākehā settler in 1852, in an act of vandalism in one account, or for firewood in another. An exotic Monterey pine was planted in 1875 by John Logan Campbell to replace the tōtara or pōhutukawa. Campbell repeatedly tried to grow native trees on the tihi, but the trees failed to survive – with only two pines, originally part of a shelter belt for the native trees, surviving for long. However, in 1960, one of the two was felled in another attack.

The remaining tree was later attacked twice with chainsaws by Māori activists to draw attention to injustices they claimed the New Zealand government had inflicted upon Māori. The first attack happened on 28 October 1994, the anniversary of the 1835 Declaration of Independence. A second attack in October 2000 left the tree unable to recover, and it was removed the following year by Auckland Council due to the risk of it falling. In 2007, the chainsaw used by activist Mike Smith in the first attack was placed on sale on auction site TradeMe, but withdrawn by the website after complaints and a poll of users. It was later listed on eBay. The chainsaw is now in the collection of Museum of New Zealand Te Papa Tongarewa.

A dawn ceremony conducted by the Tūpuna Maunga Authority took place upon Maungakiekie / One Tree Hill on 11 June 2016 planting nine young tōtara and pōhutukawa grown from parent trees on the maunga. The strongest single tree will eventually remain and kiekie will be added.

In 2021, The Spinoff produced a short documentary centred around the chainsaw called "The chainsaw used on One Tree Hill and heard across Aotearoa".

== In popular culture ==
- Irish rock band U2 wrote a song about the hill, "One Tree Hill", which appeared on their album The Joshua Tree. It was written to honour New Zealander Greg Carroll, an employee of the band who died in a motorcycle accident in Dublin on 3 July 1986.
  - The naming of the teen television drama, One Tree Hill and the show's final episode, was inspired in turn by the U2 song. In the series Andy Hargrove hails from New Zealand. His mother moved the family to Tree Hill, North Carolina because of the common name.
- Asteroid 23988 Maungakiekie was named after the hill by Ian P. Griffin, a British astronomer. The asteroid was discovered at the Auckland Observatory which is located in the One Tree Hill Domain, a kilometre southwest of the peak.
- Mozilla Firefox 0.9 was named One Tree Hill by Auckland resident and (at that time) Firefox lead engineer Ben Goodger.
- The American television series One Tree Hill makes reference to One Tree Hill in Auckland when character Karen Roe dates character Andy Hargrove (played by New Zealand actor Kieren Hutchison) and he talks about his home country of New Zealand.
- One Tree Hill has appeared on two seasons of The Amazing Race: The Amazing Race 2 and HaMerotz LaMillion 1.
