= Auckland isthmus =

Narrow landstrip in Auckland, New Zealand

- Waitemata Group
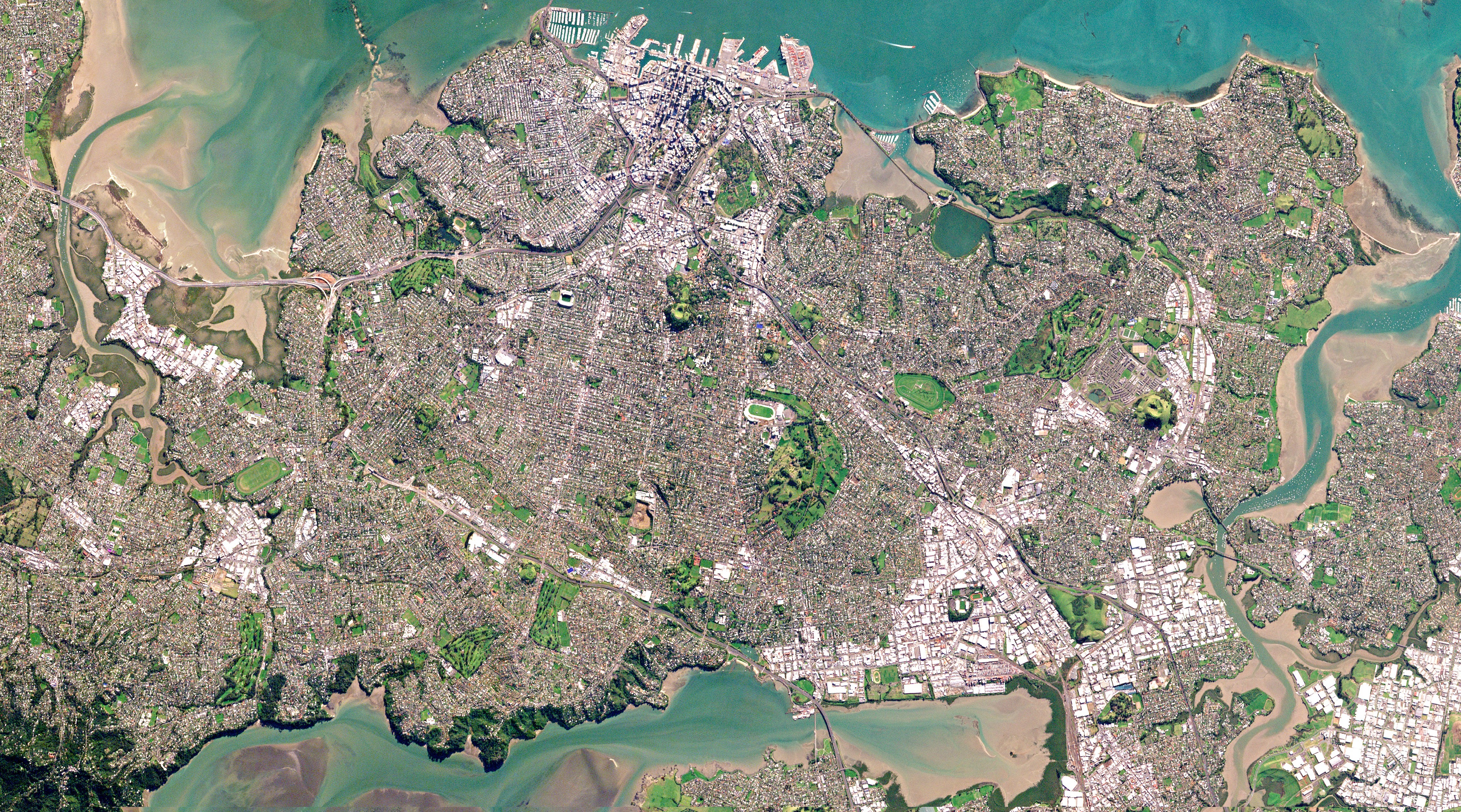
- The Auckland isthmus as captured by a Planet Labs satellite in 2016

- Location within New Zealand
- Coordinates: 36°53′50″S 174°46′50″E
- Location: Auckland Region, New Zealand
- Age: Early Miocene, Quaternary

Approximate extent of the isthmus, bounded by Portage Road, Ōtāhuhu and Portage Road, New Lynn

The Auckland isthmus, also known as the Tāmaki isthmus, is a narrow stretch of land on the North Island of New Zealand in the Auckland Region, and the location of the central suburbs of the city of Auckland and the central business district. The isthmus is located between two rias (drowned river valleys): the Waitematā Harbour to the north, which opens to the Hauraki Gulf / Tīkapa Moana and Pacific Ocean, and the Manukau Harbour to the south, which opens to the Tasman Sea. The isthmus is the most southern section of the Northland Peninsula.

The Auckland isthmus is bound on the eastern side by the Tāmaki River and by the Whau River on the west; two tidal estuaries of the Waitematā Harbour. These were used as portages by early Māori migration canoes and Tāmaki Māori to cross the isthmus (the Tāmaki River crossing known as Te Tō Waka, and the Whau River as Te Tōangawaka). Through early European settler history, canals were variously considered at either portage, however by the 1910s these projects were abandoned.

The isthmus was the centre of the Waiohua confederation of iwi in the 17th and early 18th centuries, who centred life around elaborate fortified pā of Maungawhau / Mount Eden and Maungakiekie / One Tree Hill. After the defeat of paramount chief Kiwi Tāmaki circa 1740, the isthmus became the rohe of Ngāti Whātua Ōrākei. In 1840, European settlers established the town of Auckland on the Waitematā Harbour, followed shortly after by the fencible towns of Onehunga, Ōtāhuhu and Panmure. The city developed outwards from the Port of Auckland, and by the mid-20th century the isthmus was almost completely urbanised. Originally organised as a variety of fractured land boards, boroughs and cities, the entire isthmus was amalgamated into a single local authority called Auckland City during the 1989 New Zealand local government reforms, which lasted until the 2010 unification of all local government in the Auckland Region to create the Auckland Council.

Since European colonisation of the region, the isthmus has seen major changes in landscape and infrastructure, including quarrying of scoria cones in the Auckland volcanic field, the draining of swamps and wetlands for farmland and housing and land reclamation on the Auckland waterfront. Large-scale infrastructure projects, including the rail network in the 1870s, the Auckland Motorways from the 1950s, and bridges (most notably the Auckland Harbour Bridge, opening in 1959 and connecting the isthmus to the North Shore), have fuelled population growth and suburban sprawl, both on the isthmus and in the greater Auckland Region.

== Geological history ==
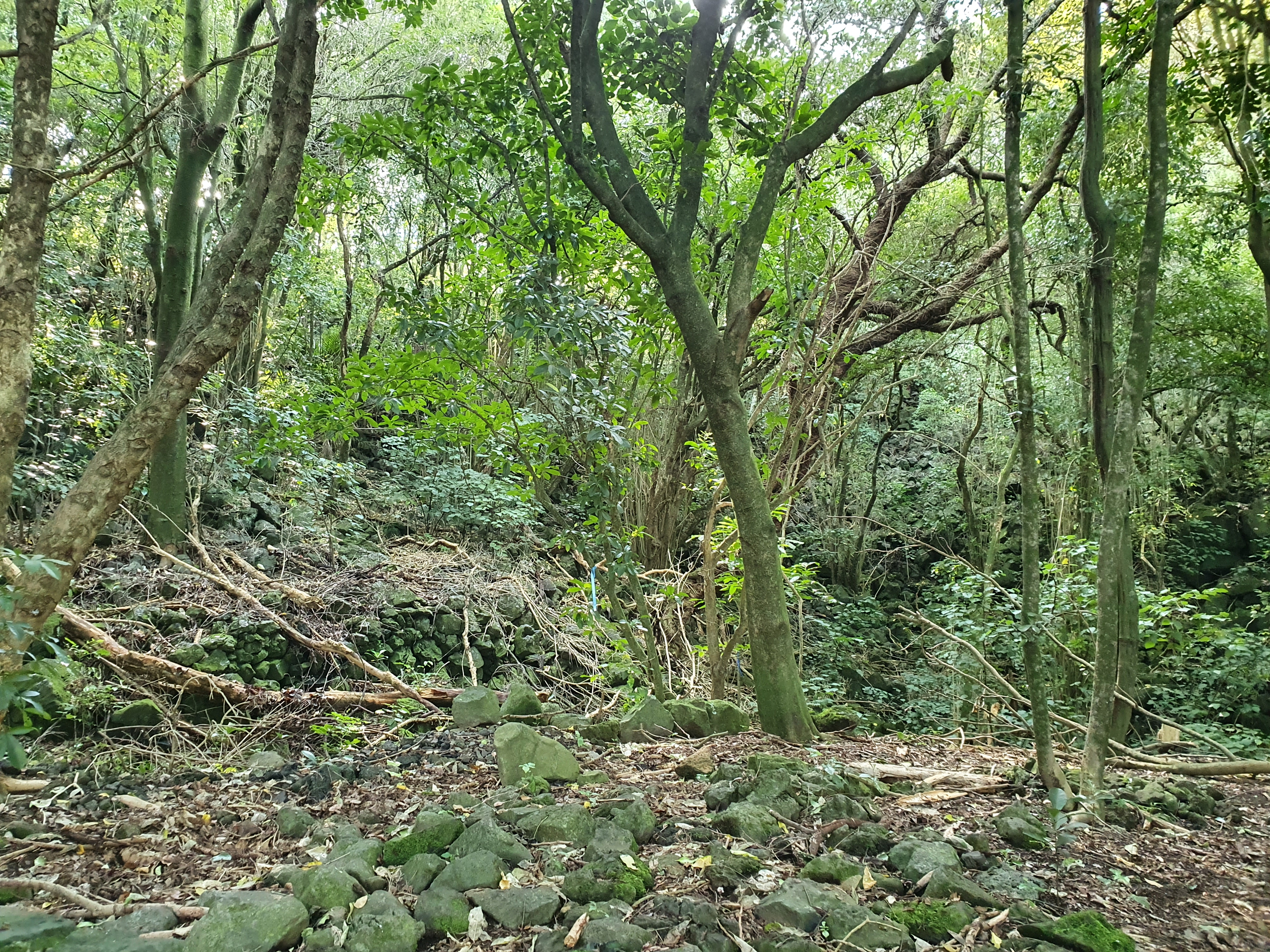
Almorah Rock Forest, an ecosystem that once covered much of the Auckland isthmus (pictured: lava rock forest remnant at Withiel Thomas Reserve, Newmarket)

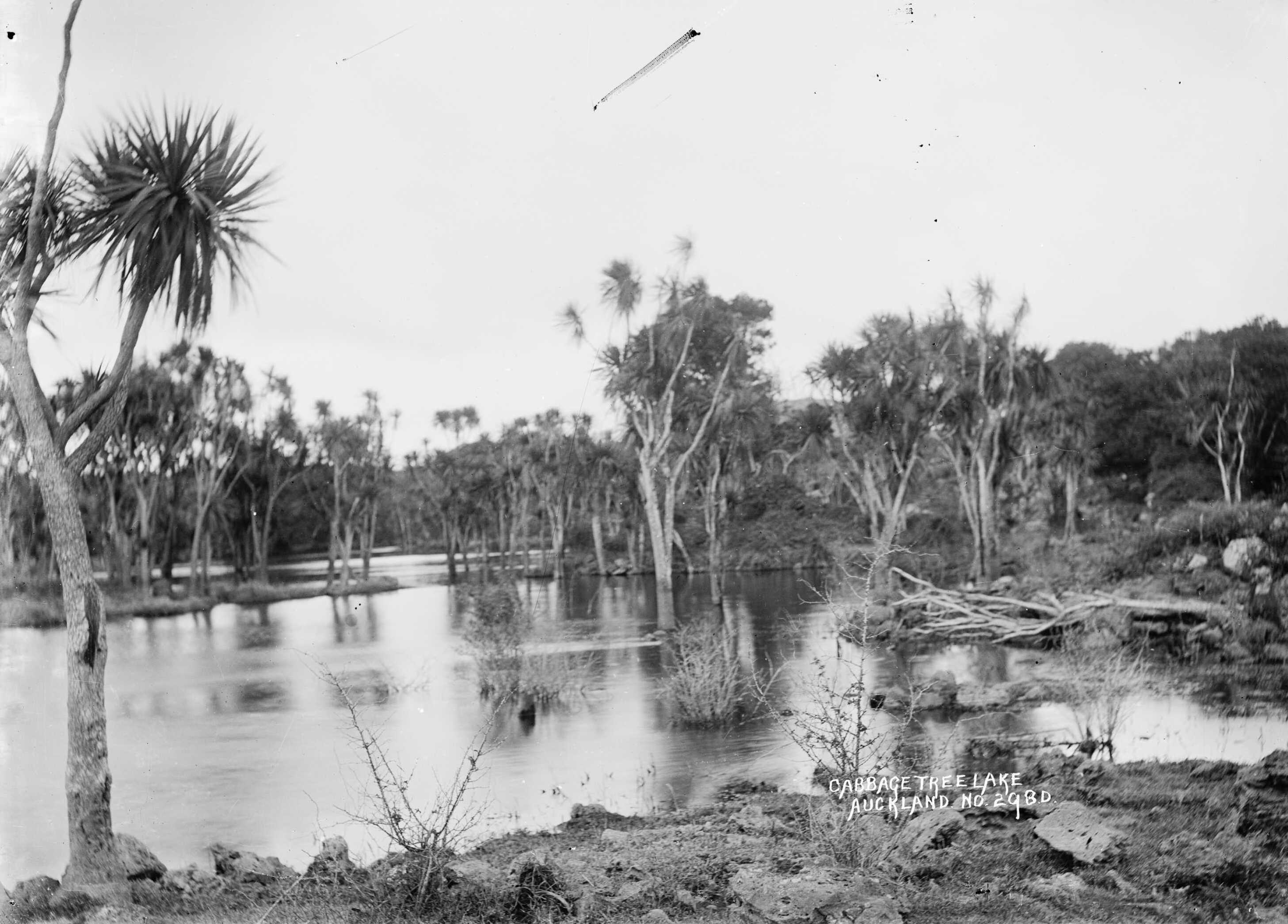
Wetlands and swamps surrounded by Cordyline australis (cabbage trees / tī kōuka) formed in many of the unforested areas of the isthmus (pictured: Cabbage Tree Swamp in Sandringham, circa 1910)

The isthmus is formed from sections of Early Miocene Waitemata Group marine sedimentary rock, with Quaternary volcanic rock from geologically recent volcanic eruptions and lava flows. Approximately 23 million years ago, tectonic forces between the Pacific Plate and Australian Plate pushed the Auckland isthmus and surrounding areas to depths of 2,000-3,000 metres under sea-level. This formed a wide sedimentary basin, sheltered by the large Waitākere Volcano to the west. The Waitemata Group sedimentary rocks were formed by eroding deposits from the Northland Peninsula, then an uplifted island. As tectonic forces changed, the begin was uplifted approximately 17 million years ago.

The isthmus in its current structure was formed at the end of the Last Glacial Maximum (known locally as the Ōtira Glaciation), between 12,000 and 7,000 years ago. As sea levels rose, the river valley to the north, which was carved through the Miocene marine sediments of the Waitemata Group, drowned and became a tidal estuary, the Waitematā Harbour. A similar process occurred on the Manukau Harbour to the south. During the Last Glacial Maximum, the modern isthmus was dominated by podocarp-angiosperm forest such as kahikatea, Prumnopitys taxifolia (matai) and tree ferns such as Alsophila smithii (kātote). As the area warmed, much of the podocarp forest was displaced by Myrtaceae such as pōhutukawa and Ascarina lucida. Prior to human settlement, much of the isthmus was covered in broadleaf tree forests, predominantly Beilschmiedia tarairi (taraire) and Vitex lucens (pūriri) trees.

A large section of the Auckland volcanic field is found on the Auckland isthmus, including some of the most prominent basaltic tuff and scoria volcanoes: Maungawhau / Mount Eden, Maungakiekie / One Tree Hill, Ōhinerau / Mount Hobson, Maungarei / Mount Wellington and Ōwairaka / Mount Albert. Most of these volcanoes have erupted in the last 30,000 years, however the oldest identified volcanoes on the isthmus include Albert Park Volcano and Glover Park, which are estimated to have erupted 145,000 and 161,000 years ago respectively). The volcanic activity caused much of the land on the isthmus to be formed from volcanic rock, such as the Te Kōpuke / Mount Saint John eruption (circa 28,000 years ago), which caused a lava flow crossing the isthmus and forming the Meola Reef in the Waitematā Harbour.

Volcanism has influenced the geography of the isthmus, creating unique forested areas and swamplands. Underneath much of the isthmus are lava caves formed from eruptions such as Maungawhau / Mount Eden (circa 28,000 years ago). Known as Ngā Ana Wai to Tāmaki Māori, the caves fed fresh water into springs and swamps around Sandringham and Western Springs. The eruption of Maungarei / Mount Wellington (circa 10,000 years ago) blocked existing creeks on the isthmus and led to the formation of Waiatarua, a former lake and current wetland reserve/golf-course in Remuera/Meadowbank. Low-lying swamps were predominantly vegetated with Cordyline australis (cabbage tree / tī kōuka) and Phormium tenax (harakeke flax), and also formed behind beach deposits at the mouths of streams

The volcanic eruptions led to the creation of the Epsom rock forest / Almorah rock forest, an ecosystem unique to the isthmus formed of trees such as Meryta sinclairii (puka), Litsea calicaris (mangeao), Alectryon excelsus (tītoki), Melicytus ramiflorus (māhoe), Piper excelsum (kawakawa) and Pseudopanax lessonii (houpara) growing in a primarily in a rock and leaf humus environment, with minimal soil. The largest remaining area of native bush on the isthmus is the Kepa Bush Reserve at the edge of the Purewa Creek in southern Mission Bay, where kohekohe trees dominate the old growth sections of the reserve.

The isthmus is a part of the Northland temperate kauri forests ecoregion, Locally, the isthmus together with surrounding lowland areas and the North Shore as far north as East Coast Bays form the Department of Conservation's Tāmaki Ecological District. The western side of the isthmus serves as a border between the Western Northland and Hauraki-Auckland bioregions for land snails.

Due to the length of the Northland Peninsula, there are significant tidal differences between the two harbours that border the isthmus. After high tide reaches the Waitematā Harbour, it takes approximately 3.5 hours for high tide to reach the Manukau Harbour.

== Human context ==
=== Māori history ===
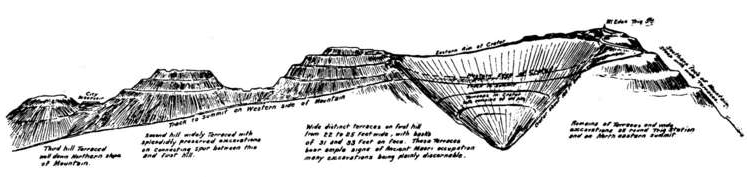
Terracing on Maungawhau / Mount Eden, one of the most populated locations on the isthmus during the Waiohua confederation of the 17th and 18th centuries

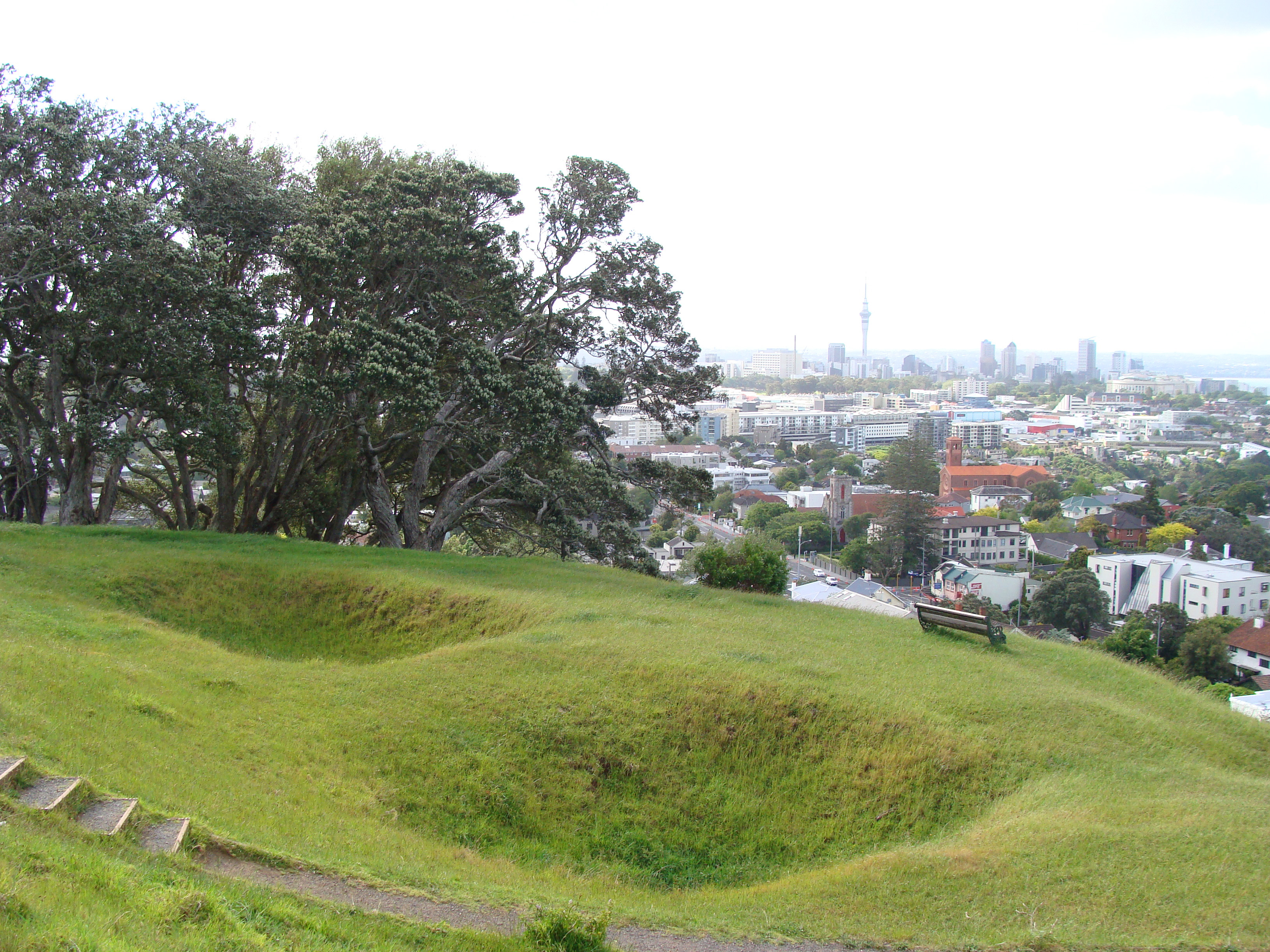
Kūmara (sweet potato) was widely grown on the isthmus during the pre-European period, and stored in rua kūmara (storehouses) (pictured: storehouse pit remnants on Ōhinerau)

The Auckland isthmus was an early location visited by many of the Māori migration canoes, including the Matahourua, Aotea, Mātaatua, Tainui, Tākitimu, Tokomaru, Te Wakatūwhenua and Moekākara waka. The area was called Tāmaki Makaurau, meaning "Tāmaki desired by many", in reference to the desirability of its natural resources and geography. Tāmaki Māori found the isthmus to be an important strategic location, due to the fertile soils and rich resources from the two harbours that bound the isthmus.

Portages, where waka could be moved across the isthmus at its most narrow points, were important features of the isthmus for Tāmaki Māori. The most important of these was Te Tō Waka, at the modern location of Portage Road, Ōtāhuhu south of Ōtāhuhu / Mount Richmond, where only 200 metres of land separated the Manukau Harbour from the Tāmaki River. Other major portages were Karetu, which was to the south of Mutukaroa / Hamlins Hill Regional Park, and Te Tōanga Waka (the Whau Portage), which connected the Whau River, Avondale Creek (Waitahurangi) to Karaka, which was the coast on the Manukau Harbour at Green Bay. In addition to portages, trails across the isthmus were created, one of the most notable being Karangahape Road, connecting the central isthmus to Cornwallis / Karangahape in the southern Waitākere Ranges.

Between the 13th and 18th centuries, much of the isthmus was deforested, and devoted to kūmara (sweet potato) cultivation. Land underwent periods of shifting cultivation, where once the soil was exhausted, a new field would be tilled, and the former would be colonised by fast-growing native plants. After harvesting, crops would be stored in rua kūmara, a storehouse fitted over a dry pit that is often found on the volcanic cones of the isthmus.

In the 17th century, chief Hua Kaiwaka consolidated tribes on the isthmus as a confederation called Waiohua, a union which lasted for three generations until the early 18th century. Thousands of people lived at fortified pā complexes on Maungawhau / Mount Eden and Maungakiekie / One Tree Hill, and Waiohua settlements were found at Maungarei, Onehunga, Remuera, Ōrākei, Kohimarama, Rarotonga / Mount Smart, Te Tatua-a-Riukiuta, Ōwairaka / Mount Albert, the Waihorotiu Valley (modern Auckland CBD), in addition to Māngere to the south of the isthmus. Almost all hills, headlands and mountains on the isthmus have some history of Māori occupancy. The Te Taoū hapū of Ngāti Whātua defeated Kiwi Tāmaki, the paramount chief of Waiohua circa 1741, at a battle at Paruroa (Big Muddy Creek) in the lower Waitākere Ranges. After Waiohua were defeated in a series of battles, some members of Te Taoū settled at Tāmaki Makaurau and intermarried with Waiohua, later becoming known as Ngāti Whātua Ōrākei. During this period, the isthmus began to be reforested, due to the relatively small population of Ngāti Whātua Ōrākei. In the 1780s, Te Tahuri, a chieftainess of Te Taou gifted land on the Western shore of the Tāmaki River to Ngāti Pāoa at Mokoia (modern day Panmure), and within a generation Ngāti Pāoa almost outnumbered Ngāti Whātua on the isthmus. While Ngāti Whātua and Ngāti Pāoa peacefully co-exited at first, an incident during a sharking expedition which led to the death of Tarahawaiki (father of Apihai Te Kawau) began a cycle of revenge attacks between Ngāti Whātua/Waiohua and Ngāti Pāoa. While peacemaking Ngāti Whātua and Ngāti Pāoa began in 1793, Ngāpuhi from the north attacked Ngāti Pāoa, culminating in a battle at the mouth of the Tāmaki River, where Ngāti Pāoa fended off Ngāpuhi. By the time missionaries Samuel Marsden and John Gare Butler visited the isthmus in 1820, there were thousands of inhabitants living along the shores of the Tāmaki River.

In late 1821 during the Musket Wars, a Ngāpuhi taua (war party) led by Hongi Hika attacked Mauināina pā and Mokoia village on the banks of the Tāmaki River (modern-day Panmure), causing a great number of deaths. This incident marked the beginning of a period of time when the isthmus was most deserted, when Tāmaki Māori sheltered in regions away from the threat of Te Tai Tokerau Māori raiders that continued on until the early 1830s. Ngāti Pāoa began to return to the Hauraki Gulf region in the 1820s, however primarily focused resettling Waiheke Island, where there were many trade opportunities with whalers. Ngāti Whātua returned to the isthmus by the mid-1830s, resettling in the Māngere Bridge-Onehunga area. By the 1840s, much of the landscape of the Auckland isthmus was covered in bracken fern. The shoreline of the Waitematā Harbour was populated with pōhutukawa trees, however during the 1840s onwards most mature specimens were cut down to use for ship building.

=== European history ===
==== Early colonial period ====
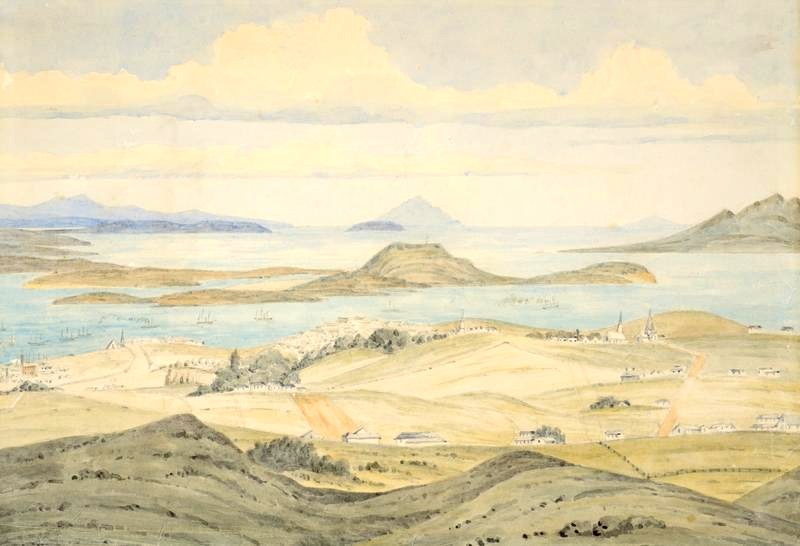
The Auckland and Parnell settlements on the isthmus in the 1860s, as seen in a watercolour by Edward Harker

In 1840 after the signing of the Treaty of Waitangi, paramount chief Apihai Te Kawau made a tuku (strategic gift) of land at Waihorotiu on the Waitematā Harbour to William Hobson, the first Governor of New Zealand, as a location for the capital of the colony to develop. This location became the modern city of Auckland, beginning with a port develop around Commercial Bay. In mid-1840, Apihai Te Kawau relocated the majority of the Ngāti Whātua from the Manukau Harbour to Remuera-Ōrākei on the Waitematā Harbour, closer to the new settlement of Auckland. Dual ports were created on either side of the isthmus for the European settlement: the Port of Auckland on the Waitematā Harbour, and the Port of Onehunga on the Manukau Harbour, separated by nine kilometres. In 1841, the Crown purchased the Kohimarama block from Ngāti Pāoa (6,000 acres extending from Mission Bay south to Panmure). Ngāti Pāoa understood that this deal allowed for Ngāti Pāoa to settle and establish a trading post at Parnell near the new city of Auckland, however no reserves were set aside. Land at Mechanics Bay was eventually established as a general area for Ngāti Pāoa, other iwi and poorer visitors to Auckland, which was declared a public domain in 1898.

Between 1847 and 1852, the towns of Onehunga, Ōtāhuhu and Panmure were established by Governor George Grey as outposts for the Royal New Zealand Fencible Corps, a collection of retired British and Irish soldiers, to serve as a buffer against a perceived threat of war from the south. Onehunga on the Manukau Harbour became a major port town, facilitating trade with Manukau-based Tāmaki Māori and Waikato tribes, who would sell and barter resources such as peaches, melons, fish and potatoes. By 1855, most Ngāti Whātua Ōrākei lands had either been given as tuku to the Crown, or lost through property speculators, with only the 700-acre Ōrākei block remaining.

Larger areas of Auckland were able to be developed after the creation of Great North Road and Great South Road, the latter of which was created during the 1860s to facilitate troop movements during the Invasion of the Waikato. During the 1860s, affluent members of society in Auckland began to move into the countryside, living at locations such as modern Newmarket and Epsom. By the late 1860s, the economy on the isthmus began to decline, after soldiers left the area at the end of the invasion, and because the capital was moved south to Wellington.

==== 1850s–1950s: development and state housing ====
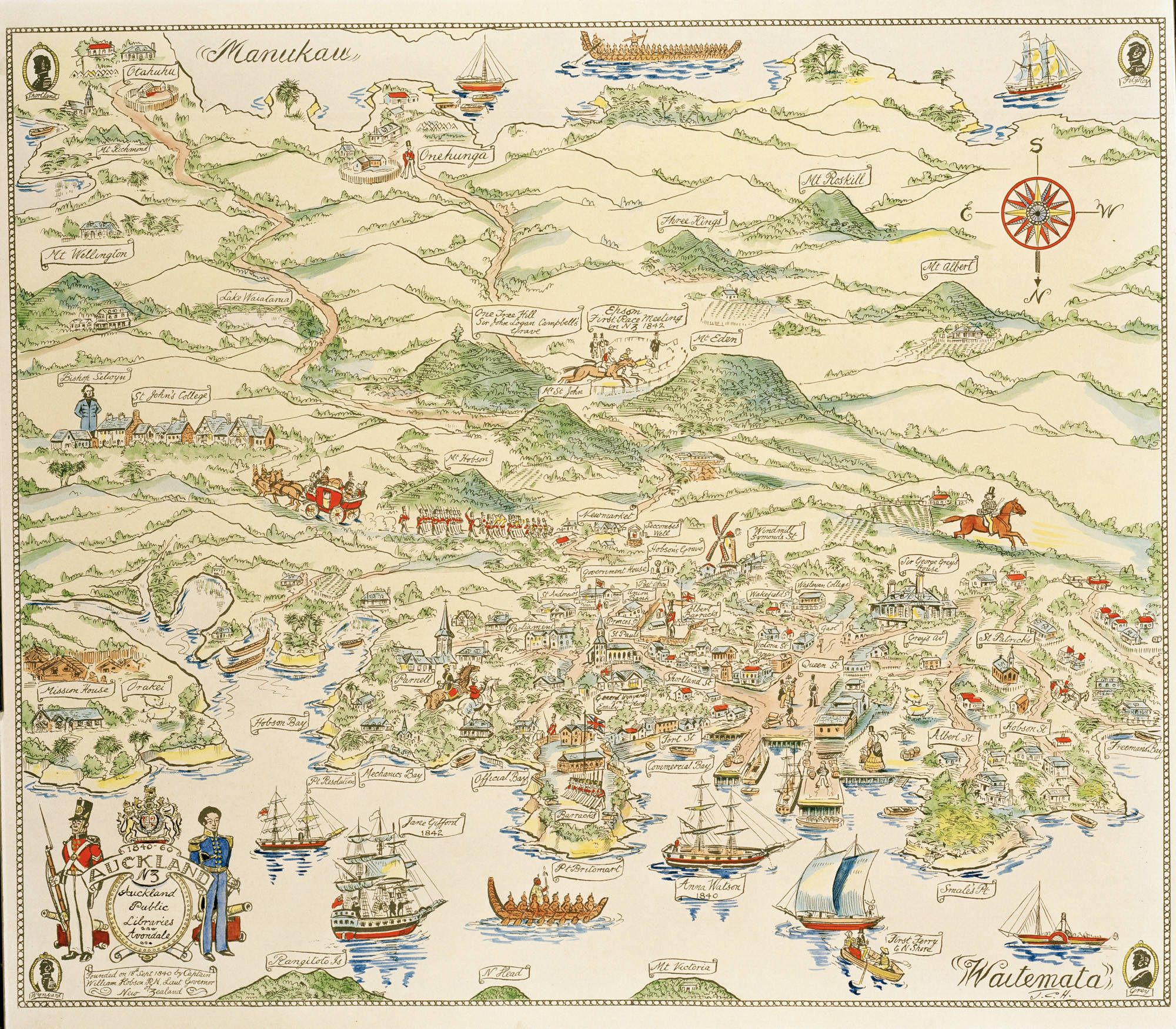
A pictorial map of the Auckland isthmus circa 1860, looking south from the city of Auckland towards the settlements of Ōtāhuhu and Onehunga

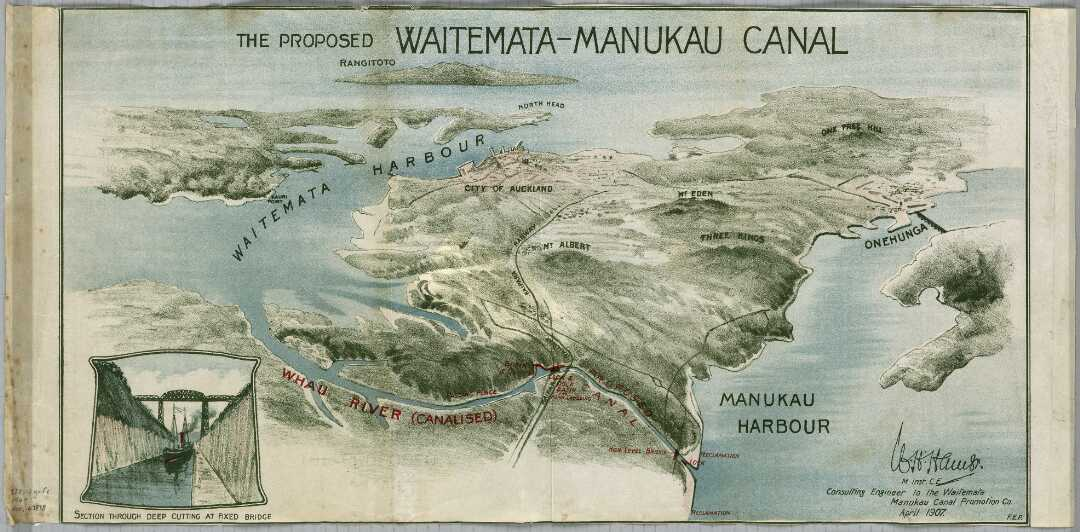
The proposed Waitematā-Manukau harbour canal, along the Whau River (1907)

Beginning in 1859, land reclamation in the Waitematā Harbour enabled Auckland to become a shipping hub, facilitating the export of goods such as gold from the Thames gold rush and kauri logging, until these resources were exhausted in the early 1900s. By 1890, 53 hectares of land was reclaimed at the Ports of Auckland. In the 1880s, many headlands of the Waitematā Harbour were developed into military forts due to concerns over a potential invasion from Russia, including Point Resolution in Parnell and Bastion Point at Ōrākei (however most prominently seen at North Head and Mount Victoria on the North Shore). During the 19th century, plans for a canal (variously at the Ōtāhuhu portage or the Whau River portage) linking the two sides of the isthmus were widely discussed, however plans never eventuated, and by the 1910s the idea had been abandoned, after the completion of the North Island Main Trunk railway.

During the 1800s, many of the volcanic cones on the isthmus such as Maungawhau / Mount Eden, Te Kōpuke / Mount Saint John and Maungarei / Mount Wellington began to be quarried, so that the scoria could be used for roading materials, however by the end of the century, lava basalt deposits or greywacke from the Hunua Ranges was preferred. By the 1860s, the Albert Park Volcano had been entirely quarried, and by the 1880s the non-volcanic Point Britomart headland was quarried to be used as fill for land reclamation in Mechanics Bay.

The isthmus was connected to surrounding areas of Auckland through infrastructure projects. The Panmure Bridge connecting to eastern Auckland farmland and the fencibles settlement of Howick was opened in 1866, followed by the Māngere Bridge linking Auckland south in 1875, and the first Grafton Bridge in 1884, linking the central city to Grafton across the Grafton Gully. Auckland's first railway opened in 1873, running 13 km (8.1 mi) between Point Britomart and Onehunga via Newmarket and Penrose. The railway was soon extended southward from Penrose beyond the isthmus, reaching Pukekohe by 1875 and connecting as far south as Te Awamutu in the Waikato by 1880. On 29 March 1880 a spur of the railway was opened from Newmarket westward to Glen Eden. This was extended beyond the isthmus as far north as Helensville by the following year, forming the backbone of a link to Northland now known as the North Auckland Line.

In November 1902, tram lines were opened, connecting Onehunga and Herne Bay to the central city. By the 1920s and early 1930s, tram lines had been constructed, connecting a number of suburbs, including Mount Roskill, Remuera, Meadowbank, Point Chevalier (a suburb that was newly developed in the 1920s), Three Kings and Avondale to the central city. The opening of the tram stops led to suburban development for these suburbs, attracting middle income families, while city-adjacent suburbs such as Ponsonby, Freemans Bay and Grey Lynn developed into slums due to the deteriorating 19th century housing stock.

By the early 1900s, the Auckland isthmus became the most populated region of New Zealand. In 1911, Auckland became the industrial hub of the country, and by 1921 the Port of Auckland was the busiest in New Zealand (a title later taken by the Port of Tauranga). Between 1915 and 1940 most of the northern and central areas of the isthmus became urbanised, with the areas of Mount Albert, Avondale, Ellerslie and Onehunga joining the Auckland metropolitan sprawl. The growth of the automobile in the 1920s also led to major concreting and sealing projects on the streets of the isthmus. In the 1930s, the eastern suburbs of the Auckland isthmus were connected to the central city after the construction the Westfield Deviation and Tāmaki Drive in 1932, both constructed on reclaimed strips of Hobson Bay and the Ōrākei Basin.

Overcrowding and poor quality housing began to be combatted in the 1930s by the use of town planning and state housing projects. The first of these, dubbed the "Ōrākei Garden Suburb", was envisioned as an area primarily for lower class families while providing high quality housing impossible in the inner city slums. By 1945, the areas of Waterview and Mount Roskill had also been developed as state housing projects. The land the Ōrākei public housing estate was constructed on was Ngāti Whātua Ōrākei land, which between 1886 and 1950 was either sold by individuals to the Crown or taken through the Public Works Act, including Bastion Point (taken for a defensive fort in 1886) and the Ōkahu Bay sewage plant in 1908 (now the site of Kelly Tarlton's Sea Life Aquarium), which caused significant pollution in the bay near the Ngāti Whātua kāinga. The kāinga and marae at Ōkahu Bay were seized and burned in 1952, under the pretense of beautification for the royal visit of Queen Elizabeth II in 1953, and the residents were relocated to nearby state housing.

==== 1950s–1983: motorways, immigration and suburban sprawl ====
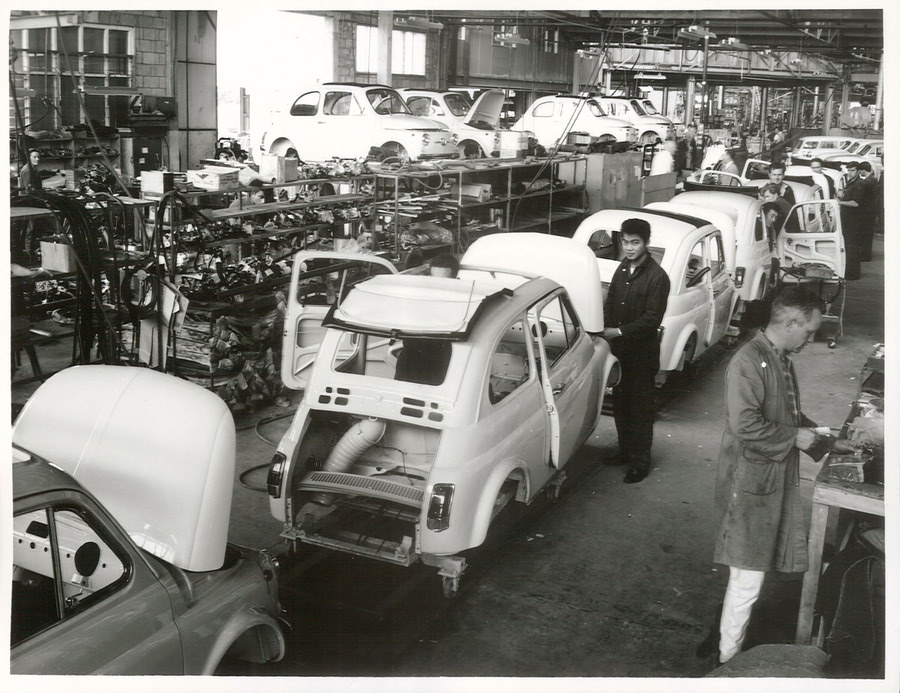
Fiat 500s being manufactured at Ōtāhuhu in 1966. By 1967, New Zealand had one of highest per capita car ownership rates in the world.

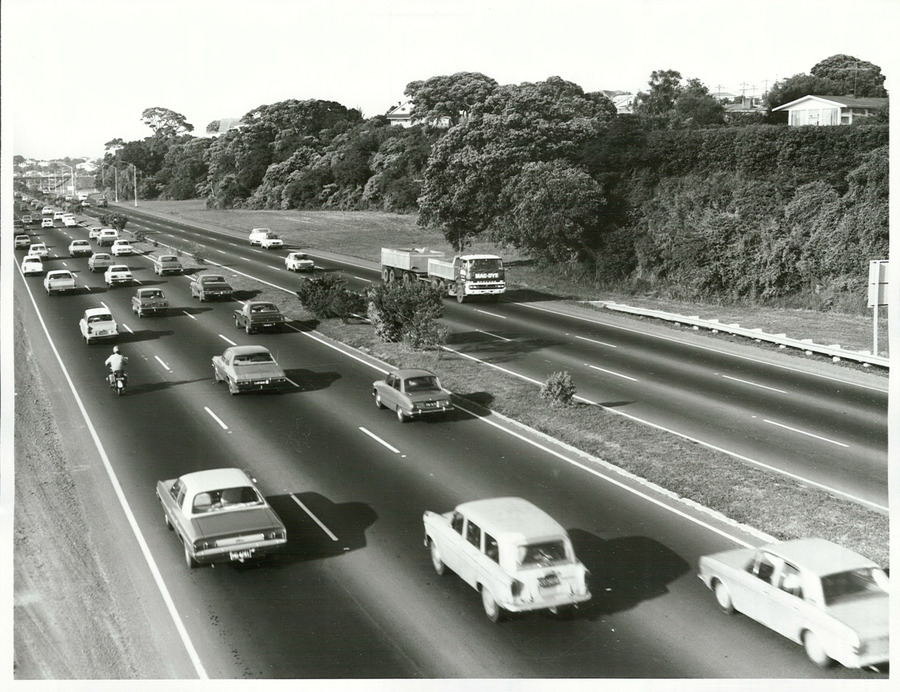
The morning traffic rush on the Auckland Northern Motorway in 1975.

By the mid-1950s, motorways became a new type of civil engineering project that began to dominate the isthmus. The first section that opened was the Northwestern Motorway in 1952, connecting Westerview to the Te Atatū Peninsula in West Auckland, to create a dedicated corridor to reach the civilian airport at Whenuapai. By the mid-1950s, a new location at the Māngere Aerodrome became the favoured location for an international airport, and the Auckland Airport was opened at Māngere in 1966, while the Whenuapai airport remained as the RNZAF Base Auckland. The Northwestern Motorway was followed by the Auckland Southern Motorway, which first opened between Ellerslie and Mount Wellington in 1953, and in 1959 the opening of the Auckland Harbour Bridge and Auckland Northern Motorway. In the 1960s and 1970s, plans for these three motorways to join led to the creation of the Central Motorway Junction, which involved the destruction of 15,000 homes and displaced over 45,000 residents in central suburbs such as Newton and Freemans Bay, while effectively creating a barrier around the Auckland CBD cutting it off from the surrounding neighbourhoods. The construction of the Central Motorway Junction caused businesses to relocate away from Karangahape Road, adjacent to the junction, causing the area to become established as a red-light district. The new car-centric model for the isthmus and greater Auckland led to the removal of the Auckland tram lines, which were replaced with trolleybuses, and ultimately by bus routes. A central rail loop and rail electrification project was proposed in the early 1950s by the New Zealand Railways Department and championed by major Dove-Myer Robinson, however was opposed by urban planners and counsellors. Funding for this project was scrapped in the 1970s by the Third National Government.

The increase of motorways, the opening of the Harbour Bridge and reliance on cars made distant areas of the Auckland region more accessible, fueling a process of urban sprawl in Auckland. Suburban areas outside of the isthmus became more popular choices for residents of Auckland, with areas such as Te Atatū Peninsula in West Auckland and Ōtara in South Auckland developing as middle class suburbs and low income state-funded housing estates. Glen Innes, one of the final farmland areas on the isthmus, was developed as a social housing area by local government in the 1950s. By 1964, western developments at New Windsor and Mount Roskill, south-eastern developments at Oranga and Mount Wellington, and remaining patches such as Tāmaki led to the Auckland isthmus becoming a contiguous urban sprawl. In 1945, the CBD and inner city suburbs had a population of 68,000, however due to suburbanisation the population fell over the next 50 years, only recovering to 1945 levels by the mid-2000s. As Auckland city sprawled outwards from the isthmus, industrial suburbs previously on the outer belt of the city away from residential areas became engulfed by the city. Areas such as Avondale, Rosebank and New Lynn to the west, Mount Wellington, Penrose and Ōtāhuhu to the south/east, where motor vehicle factories, paint manufacturing, clothing factories, freezing works and allied trades were located, were now surrounded by suburban housing.

As people moved towards the suburbs, the CBD and adjacent central suburbs declined in popularity. In 1945, 38% of the Auckland workforce was based in the CBD, however by 1962 this figure had dropped to 26%. By the 1940s and 1950s, the oldest suburbs adjacent to the central city had become dilapidated due to the ageing housing stock. During World War II, Urban Māori had settled in the inner suburbs of Auckland such as Ponsonby and Parnell, however by the 1960s Polynesian migrants tended to settle in these inner city suburbs, while Māori tended to live near the Auckland city limits outside of the isthmus. Pasifika immigrants typically came from the countries associated with the Realm of New Zealand: Western Samoa, the Cook Islands and Niue. By the 1950s, the Auckland City Council began to plan the demolition of the oldest suburbs such as Freemans Bay. Council-funded multi-storey flats had begun to be built in the central suburbs by 1954, however the wide-scale plans for demolition of older housing stock never went ahead. During this period, many areas of the CBD that had previously been housing areas were re-developed as commercial premises.

Gentrification of the inner suburbs began in the 1970s, when primarily white and educated youth moved to suburbs such as Ponsonby, seeing an urban, multi-cultural lifestyle. These populations tended to purchase houses outright, meaning Pasifika families who relied on rental houses tended to move to the peripheral suburbs of Auckland such as Avondale, and especially areas where state housing projects had increased rental housing stock, such as Māngere and Ōtara in South Auckland. The central suburb of Grey Lynn remained a hub for Auckland Pasifika until the 1980s, with Pasifika populations only dropping in the late 1980s.

By 1975, developments at Lynfield and Mount Wellington meant the Auckland isthmus was almost entirely urbanised.

==== 1983 onwards: CBD development and intensification ====
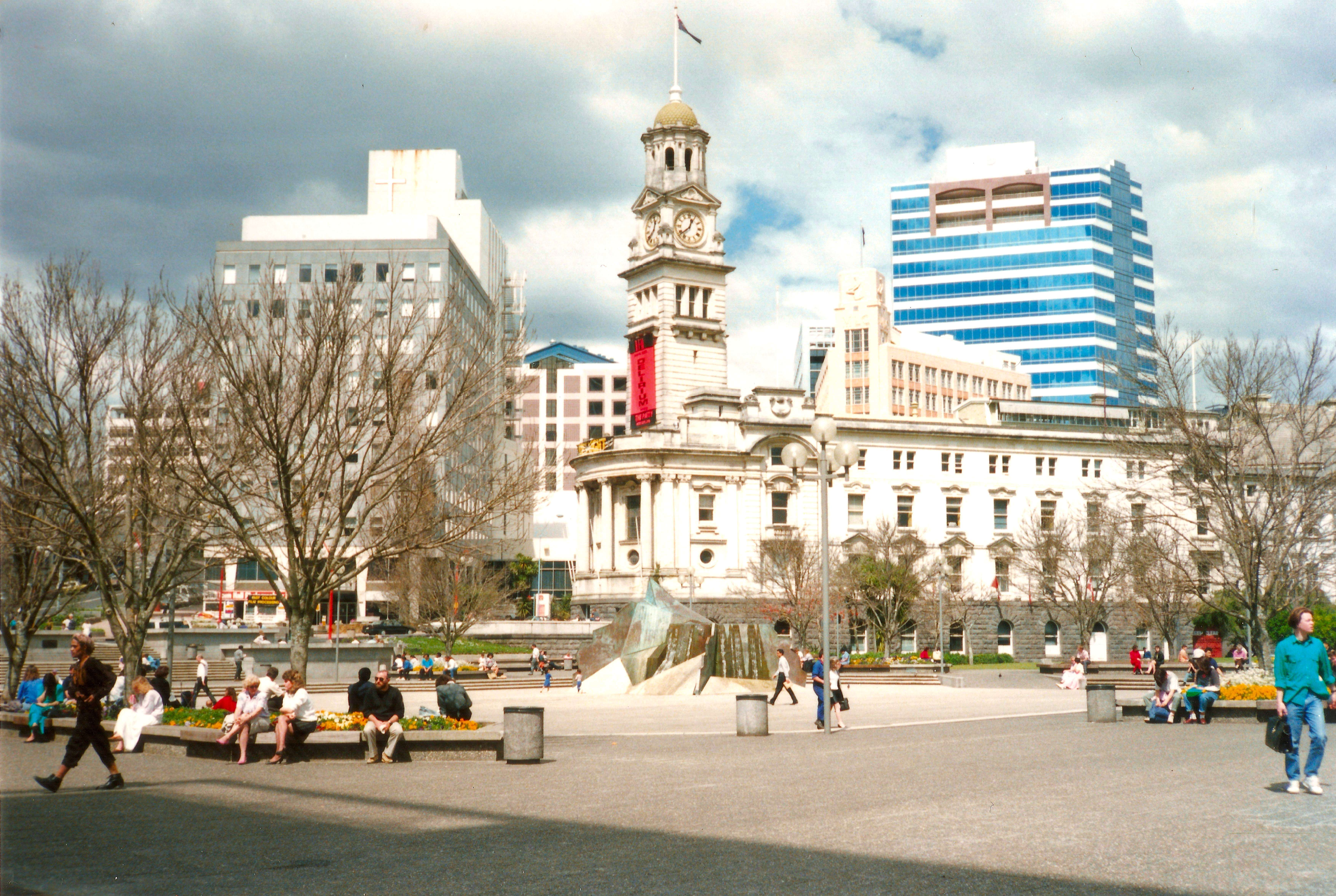
Aotea Square in the 1990s, showing the Edwardian Auckland Town Hall surrounded by newly built high rise buildings

Between 1983 and 1987, overseas investments led to an office building boom in the Auckland CBD, making the Auckland CBD the financial capital of New Zealand. The 1987 stock market crash led to the collapse of many property development companies, and much of the office space they had built was repurposed as residential apartments. Between 1991 and 2007, the population of the central city doubled, due to the wide-scale construction of apartments. Due to minimal planning requirements, central Auckland apartments developed a reputation for poor design. By 2007, the central government had introduced minimum standards for size and design for apartments.

The 1990s and early 2000s saw a revitalisation of the CBD and the central suburbs. Many projects focused on the CBD and waterfront areas, due to Auckland hosting the 2000 and 2003 America's Cup. This was seen again in 2011, when the Rugby World Cup led to the redevelopment of Wynyard Quarter, Queens Wharf, Eden Park and the central Auckland train stations.

Since the 1990s, measures to combat urban sprawl have been undertaken by the Auckland councils, especially developing medium and high density housing around urban centres and public transport nodes. Public transport usage, which had been falling since the 1950s, stagnated and reached its lowest levels in the early 1990s. The Britomart Transport Centre was proposed in the 1990s as a way to increase public transport use and increase land values for the CBD, and was opened in 2003. In 2001, John Banks was elected as the Mayor of Auckland City on a platform of creating the Eastern Motorway, connecting the CBD to East Auckland and the eastern isthmus suburbs, to alleviate the congestion problems faced by Auckland. The proposal was eventually dropped, as motorways began to fall out of favour in public opinion. The Waterview Connection, a motorway project linking the Northwestern and Southwestern Motorways via a twin tunnel underneath the suburbs of Waterview and Mount Albert, was opened in 2017.

Following the completion of the Britomart Transport Centre (now known as Waitematā) in 2003, several additional public transport projects were subsequently delivered to alleviate congestion, such as the electrification of Auckland railways (2014–2015), a more frequent public transport network (2016–2019), and the City Rail Link (2015–2026).

A number of legislative changes such as the 2016 Auckland Unitary Plan and the National Policy Statement on Urban Development have allowed higher density building in the isthmus and across the Auckland region.

The more liberal Immigration Act 1987 led to increased immigration from Asia in the 1990s, and Auckland became a prominent destination for international students. The Auckland isthmus, especially the CBD, became attractive to international students due to tertiary institutions such as the University of Auckland, the Auckland University of Technology and local secondary schools. Language schools and private training establishments specialising in subjects such as tourism and hospitality became common in central Auckland. By the mid-2000s, the population of the Auckland CBD was significantly more transient than most other areas of New Zealand, due to the large number of students, international tourists and domestic tourists.

== Demographics ==
The Auckland Isthmus covers 135.18 km^{2} (52.19 sq mi) (Note: In this section, the isthmus is treated as being about the same area as the Waitematā, Albert-Eden, Ōrākei, Maungakiekie-Tāmaki and Puketāpapa local board areas, with minor exceptions where statistical area units do not align with those areas, such as New Windsor East including a small part of Puketāpapa. The area is defined more precisely by table of individual statistical areas.) and had an estimated population of 427,040 as of June 2025, with a population density of 3,159 people per km^{2}.

Historical population
Year	Pop.	±% p.a.
2013	373,644	—
2018	398,940	+1.32%
2023	395,772	−0.16%

The Auckland isthmus had a population of 395,772 in the 2023 New Zealand census, a decrease of 3,168 people (−0.8%) since the 2018 census, and an increase of 22,128 people (5.9%) since the 2013 census. There were 193,956 males, 199,668 females and 2,142 people of other genders in 146,091 dwellings. 5.4% of people identified as LGBTIQ+. There were 61,317 people (15.5%) aged under 15 years, 95,634 (24.2%) aged 15 to 29, 186,687 (47.2%) aged 30 to 64, and 52,101 (13.2%) aged 65 or older.

People could identify as more than one ethnicity. The results were 53.8% European (Pākehā); 8.9% Māori; 11.4% Pasifika; 33.3% Asian; 3.7% Middle Eastern, Latin American and African New Zealanders (MELAA); and 1.6% other, which includes people giving their ethnicity as "New Zealander". English was spoken by 93.5%, Māori language by 2.0%, Samoan by 2.3%, and other languages by 31.8%. No language could be spoken by 1.9% (e.g. too young to talk). New Zealand Sign Language was known by 0.4%. The percentage of people born overseas was 44.0, compared with 28.8% nationally.

Religious affiliations were 32.2% Christian, 5.5% Hindu, 3.1% Islam, 0.5% Māori religious beliefs, 2.3% Buddhist, 0.4% New Age, 0.3% Jewish, and 1.7% other religions. People who answered that they had no religion were 48.7%, and 5.6% of people did not answer the census question.

Of those at least 15 years old, 145,644 (43.5%) people had a bachelor's or higher degree, 120,969 (36.2%) had a post-high school certificate or diploma, and 67,845 (20.3%) people exclusively held high school qualifications. 65,253 people (19.5%) earned over $100,000 compared to 12.1% nationally. The employment status of those at least 15 was that 182,493 (54.6%) people were employed full-time, 42,822 (12.8%) were part-time, and 10,569 (3.2%) were unemployed.

Individual statistical areas
Name	Area (km^{2})	Population	Density (per km^{2})	Dwellings	Median age	Median income
Saint Marys Bay	0.83	2,049	2,469	915	48.7 years	$63,800
Auckland City Centre	4.42	33,417	7,560	18,114	30.7 years	$39,400
Herne Bay	0.88	2,775	3,153	1,194	47.6 years	$70,200
Ponsonby	1.35	5,286	3,916	2,079	38.4 years	$67,200
Freemans Bay	1.02	3,981	3,903	1,884	39.7 years	$65,300
Ōrākei	3.10	5,571	1,797	2,157	42.0 years	$55,400
Parnell	2.88	7,788	2,704	3,087	36.2 years	$54,500
Westmere	2.67	5,160	1,933	1,821	40.4 years	$62,300
Point Chevalier	2.75	8,535	3,104	3,174	41.3 years	$52,300
Grafton	0.87	3,111	3,576	1,239	31.6 years	$52,000
St Heliers	3.75	11,436	3,050	4,392	45.7 years	$60,100
Mission Bay	1.54	4,329	2,753	1,800	43.6 years	$62,100
Glendowie	4.05	8,493	2,097	2,862	43.1 years	$52,900
Kohimarama	1.52	4,302	2,830	1,722	45.2 years	$63,900
Grey Lynn	2.82	11,052	3,919	4,266	34.7 years	$63,500
Eden Terrace	0.59	3,186	5,400	1,614	33.0 years	$62,000
Remuera	10.11	26,709	2,642	9,477	40.7 years	$57,400
Kingsland	0.77	3,162	4,106	1,182	32.8 years	$60,400
Newmarket	0.85	2,613	3,074	1,107	34.1 years	$49,100
Mount Eden	6.32	24,495	3,876	8,535	35.6 years	$52,900
Mount Albert	6.90	19,902	2,884	6,807	34.9 years	$48,500
Morningside	1.09	3,609	3,311	1,302	34.6 years	$56,100
Epsom	6.27	19,338	3,092	6,240	38.4 years	$45,700
Waterview	1.12	4,077	3,640	1,470	33.0 years	$44,900
Sandringham	2.52	11,514	4,569	3,984	34.9 years	$50,300
Greenlane	2.00	7,956	3,978	2,754	35.9 years	$52,100
One Tree Hill	2.75	4,500	1,636	1,704	36.0 years	$56,100
Mount Roskill	7.42	25,743	3,469	8,004	34.6 years	$39,000
Three Kings	1.39	4,095	2,946	1,470	36.3 years	$44,600
Wesley	1.97	4,725	2,398	1,359	32.5 years	$27,300
Royal Oak	1.45	5,361	3,697	1,941	38.9 years	$45,100
Onehunga	7.03	17,133	2,437	6,279	35.5 years	$50,900
Hillsborough	2.51	6,891	2,745	2,268	38.0 years	$47,000
Lynfield	2.52	7,866	3,121	2,451	38.0 years	$43,400
Waikōwhai	1.36	1,971	1,449	621	37.4 years	$54,800
Meadowbank	1.68	5,592	3,329	2,109	39.3 years	$57,900
Glen Innes-Wai o Taiki Bay	2.76	9,273	3,360	2,715	31.5 years	$41,500
St Johns	3.66	6,024	1,646	2,121	38.5 years	$50,600
Point England	1.49	4,806	3,226	1,437	31.1 years	$28,200
Stonefields	0.99	3,945	3,985	1,488	40.0 years	$66,200
Ellerslie	3.48	8,802	2,529	3,318	36.0 years	$59,300
Mount Wellington	10.36	26,280	2,537	8,553	34.0 years	$45,800
Panmure	2.95	7,890	2,675	2,610	34.3 years	$39,300
Penrose	6.42	1,029	160	465	55.9 years	$35,000
New Zealand					38.1 years	$41,500

== Local government ==
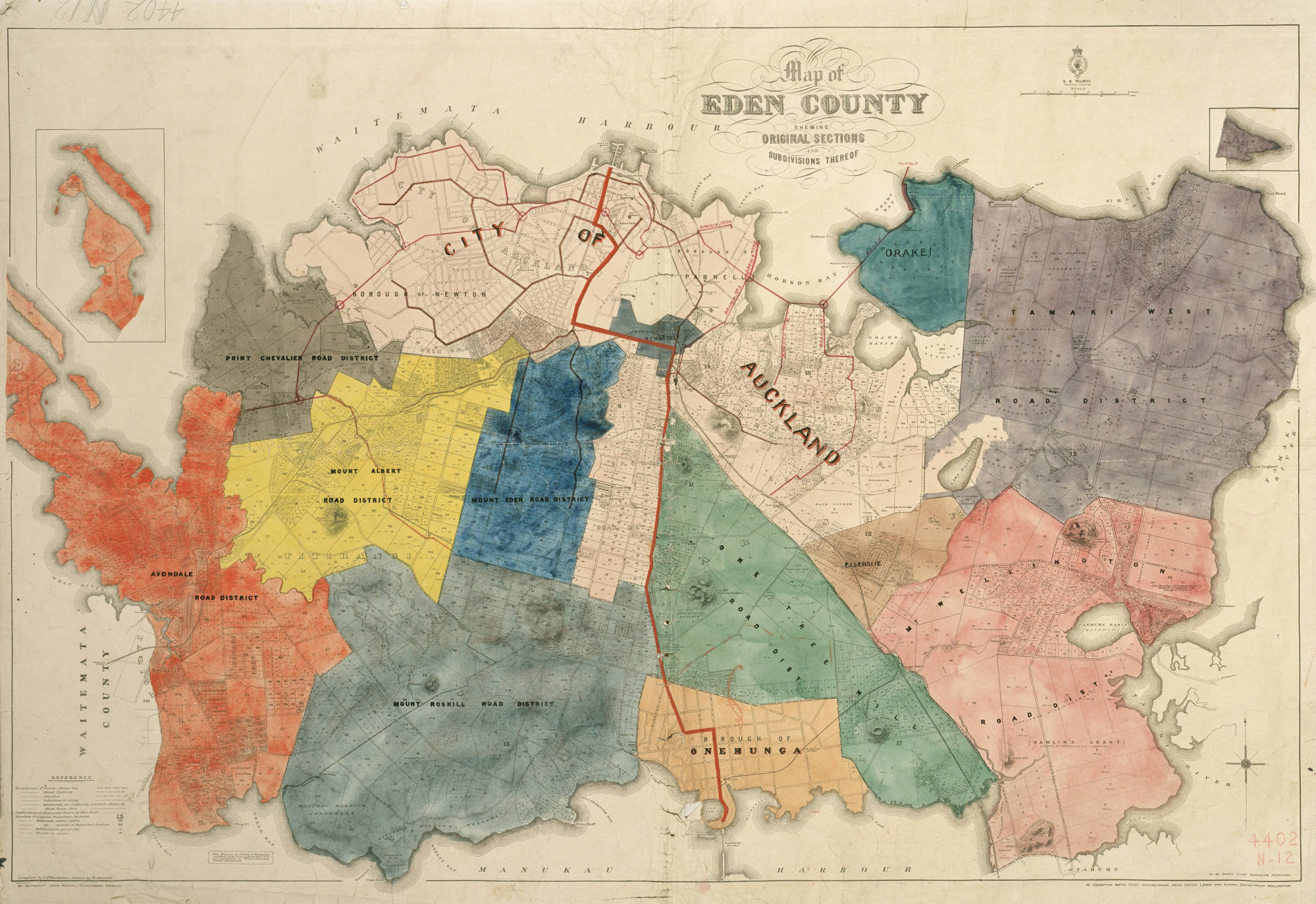
A 1914 map of the Auckland isthmus, composed of the city of Auckland and surrounding boroughs/road boards, composing what was known as Eden County.

Road boards were the first local government on the isthmus in the 1850s and 1860s outside of the colonial city, which were established due to a lack of central government funding for road improvements. By 1883, there were 69 road districts across Auckland, however as the population of the isthmus increased, these bodies merged into different boroughs and counties. South of the city was the Eden County (merged into Auckland City in 1940), which unlike most other counties in New Zealand, deferred most of its powers to the local road boards. Attempts to create local government on the isthmus began in 1851, hampered by extensive costs for roads and the 1860s economic downturn, however by April 1871 the Auckland City Council had been established around the modern-day CBD. In 1882, neighbouring road boards of Ponsonby, Karangahape and Grafton amalgamated with the city due to the improved services and infrastructure offered by the council. From 1904, a stronger focus on amalgamating surrounding areas called the Greater Auckland scheme was undertaken, inspired by similar movements in Wellington and Christchurch. This led to amalgamations with Arch Hill (1913), Grey Lynn (1914), Parnell, Remuera and Eden Terrace in 1915, followed by Epsom (1917), Point Chevalier (1921), Avondale (1927) (a merger which increased the Auckland City area by 40%), and eventually Ōrākei and rural Tāmaki to the east of the isthmus in 1928.

In 1978, the isthmus was home to several boroughs and two cities: Auckland and Mount Albert City. The two cities were joined by a third, Tamaki City, in 1986, which was a result of a merger between the Mount Wellington and Ōtāhuhu boroughs. During the 1989 New Zealand local government reforms, the isthmus was amalgamated into a single territorial body, the Auckland City, which merged the three cities and remaining boroughs: Ellerslie, Mount Eden, Mount Roskill, Newmarket, Onehunga and One Tree Hill. On 1 November 2010, the Auckland City was merged with the surrounding metropolitan and rural areas to form a single Auckland Council unitary authority. Since the formation of the council, the Auckland isthmus has been divided into five wards: the Waitematā and Gulf ward, Albert-Eden-Puketāpapa ward, Maungakiekie-Tāmaki ward, Ōrākei ward and Whau ward. The Waitematā and Gulf ward includes the Hauraki Gulf / Tīkapa Moana islands that had been administered by the Auckland City Council, while the Whau ward includes a mix of suburbs previously administered by Auckland City and Waitakere City.

The western edge of the isthmus forms the border between the Northern electricity network (serving West Auckland, the North Shore and the northern Auckland Region) and the Auckland network. Power consumers within the Auckland network are able to vote for the trustees of Entrust, an electricity consumers trust and the majority shareholder of the electricity company Vector Limited, while also receiving annual dividends.
