= Roskill =

Roskill may refer to:

- Mount Roskill, a neighbourhood of Auckland, New Zealand
  - Mount Roskill (New Zealand electorate), a House of Representatives electorate based on Mount Roskill
  - Mount Roskill Grammar School, a secondary school in Mount Roskill
  - Mount Roskill Intermediate, a middle school in Mount Roskill
- Puketāpapa, a volcano also known as Mount Roskill in Auckland, New Zealand
- Roskill (New Zealand electorate), a former parliamentary electorate, 1919–1996
- Roskill Commission on the Third London Airport, 1968–1971

== People with the surname ==
- Sir Ashton Roskill, barrister and public servant
- Eustace Roskill, Baron Roskill, judge and chair of the Roskill Commission
- Stephen Roskill, Royal Navy officer and official historian of the navy in the Second World War

== See also ==
- Roskell, a surname
- Roskelley, a surname
