= Three Kings, New Zealand =

Three Kings
- Suburb
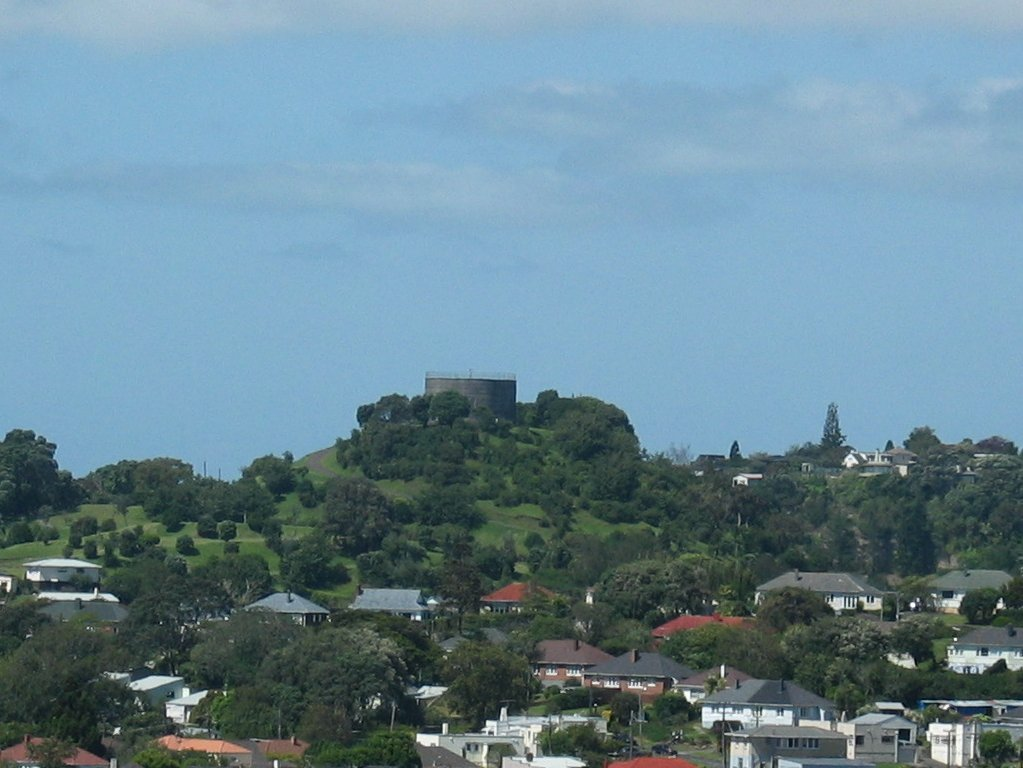
- Big King from Mt Albert
- Interactive map of Three Kings
- Coordinates: 36.902926°S 174.754651°E
- Country: New Zealand
- City: Auckland
- Local authority: Auckland Council
- Electoral ward: Albert-Eden-Puketāpapa ward
- Local board: Puketāpapa Local Board

Area
  - Land: 139 ha (340 acres)

Population (June 2025)
  - Total: 4,480
  - Density: 3,220/km^{2} (8,350/sq mi)

	Mount Eden
Mount Roskill	Three Kings	One Tree Hill, Royal Oak
	Hillsborough

Three Kings (Māori: Terī Kingī) is a suburb of Auckland, New Zealand that is built around the Te Tātua-a-Riukiuta volcano. It is home to an ethnically diverse population of about 3,500 people.

Three Kings is located six kilometres south of the city centre, between the suburbs of Royal Oak and Mount Roskill.

Three Kings features a small shopping mall and supermarket complex called Three Kings Plaza. It also has a commercial area, and an accident and medical clinic. The Mount Roskill library is situated above the Fickling Convention Centre which hosts a wide range of community events.

Te Tātua-a-Riukiuta, also known as Three Kings, had three prominent peaks and a number of smaller peaks until most of them were quarried away, leaving a sole remaining large peak (often called Big King). It was probably the most complex volcano in the Auckland volcanic field.

== Demographics ==
Three Kings covers 1.39 km^{2} (0.54 sq mi) and had an estimated population of 4,480 as of June 2025, with a population density of 3,223 people per km^{2}.

Historical population
Year	Pop.	±% p.a.
2006	3,273	—
2013	3,558	+1.20%
2018	3,891	+1.81%
2023	4,095	+1.03%
The 2006 population is for an area including what is now Mount Roskill North East but not including what is now Three Kings South, covering 1.32 km^{2}. Source:

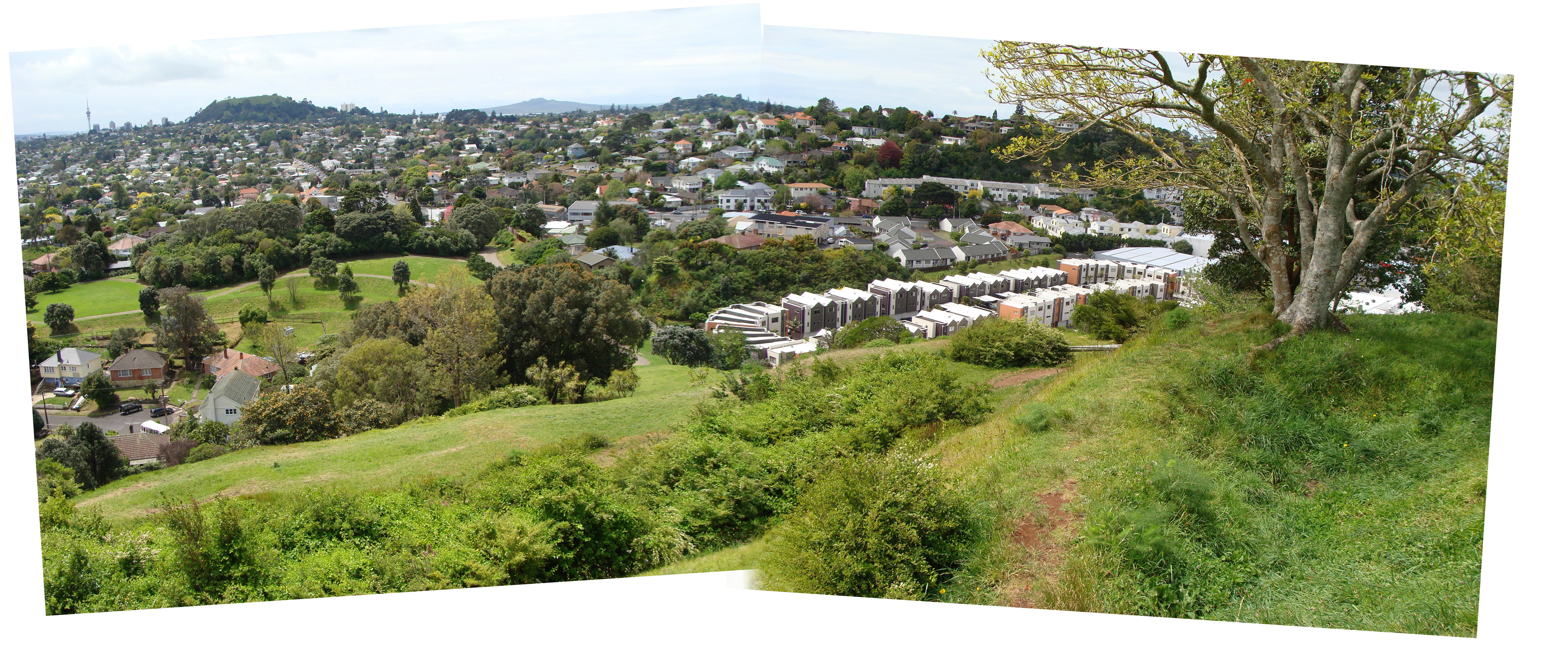
View north-east from the summit of Big King, showing terracing on the slopes from when it was a Māori pā

Three Kings had a population of 4,095 in the 2023 New Zealand census, an increase of 204 people (5.2%) since the 2018 census, and an increase of 537 people (15.1%) since the 2013 census. There were 1,947 males, 2,130 females and 18 people of other genders in 1,470 dwellings. 4.1% of people identified as LGBTIQ+. The median age was 36.3 years (compared with 38.1 years nationally). There were 555 people (13.6%) aged under 15 years, 978 (23.9%) aged 15 to 29, 1,836 (44.8%) aged 30 to 64, and 726 (17.7%) aged 65 or older.

People could identify as more than one ethnicity. The results were 39.8% European (Pākehā); 4.9% Māori; 9.4% Pasifika; 49.7% Asian; 3.8% Middle Eastern, Latin American and African New Zealanders (MELAA); and 1.4% other, which includes people giving their ethnicity as "New Zealander". English was spoken by 91.0%, Māori language by 1.2%, Samoan by 1.8%, and other languages by 42.9%. No language could be spoken by 1.8% (e.g. too young to talk). New Zealand Sign Language was known by 0.1%. The percentage of people born overseas was 52.3, compared with 28.8% nationally.

Religious affiliations were 31.4% Christian, 10.5% Hindu, 4.7% Islam, 3.4% Buddhist, 0.2% New Age, 0.1% Jewish, and 1.6% other religions. People who answered that they had no religion were 43.4%, and 5.2% of people did not answer the census question.

Of those at least 15 years old, 1,473 (41.6%) people had a bachelor's or higher degree, 1,260 (35.6%) had a post-high school certificate or diploma, and 813 (23.0%) people exclusively held high school qualifications. The median income was $44,600, compared with $41,500 nationally. 447 people (12.6%) earned over $100,000 compared to 12.1% nationally. The employment status of those at least 15 was that 1,890 (53.4%) people were employed full-time, 444 (12.5%) were part-time, and 90 (2.5%) were unemployed.

Individual statistical areas
Name	Area (km^{2})	Population	Density (per km^{2})	Dwellings	Median age	Median income
Three Kings North	0.67	1,509	2,252	609	35.4 years	$57,600
Three Kings South	0.71	2,589	3,646	861	37.0 years	$37,700
New Zealand					38.1 years	$41,500

== Education ==
Three Kings School is a contributing primary school (years 1-6) with a roll of 474 students. The school opened in 1878 as Mt Roskill School, and was a focal point for the Three Kings area, hosting Friday night dances, and other events such as concerts and plays. In 1943, the school changed its name to Three Kings School.

St Therese School is a state-integrated full primary Catholic school (years 1-8) with a roll of 83 students. The school opened in 1946, and was founded by the Sisters of St Joseph of the Sacred Heart.

Central Auckland Specialist School is a school for students with high specialist educational needs. It has a roll of 288 students. The school opened on 28 January 2018, after the merger of Carlson School for Cerebral Palsy and Sunnydene Special School. Sunnydene Special School originally opened in 1934 on Queen Street, and moved to Mount Roskill in 1967. Carlson Cerebral Palsy School originally opened in 1954 on Gilles Avenue in Epsom and moved to Three Kings in 1973.

All these schools are coeducational. Rolls are as of July 2026.

The local state secondary school is Mount Roskill Grammar School. Catholic students attend Marcellin College (coed), St Peter's College (boys) or Marist College (girls). The local intermediate is Mount Roskill Intermediate.

== Notable people ==
- Phil Goff, former Mayor of Auckland and former MP for the Mt Roskill electorate, attended Three Kings Primary School.
