= Ōwairaka =

- Suburb
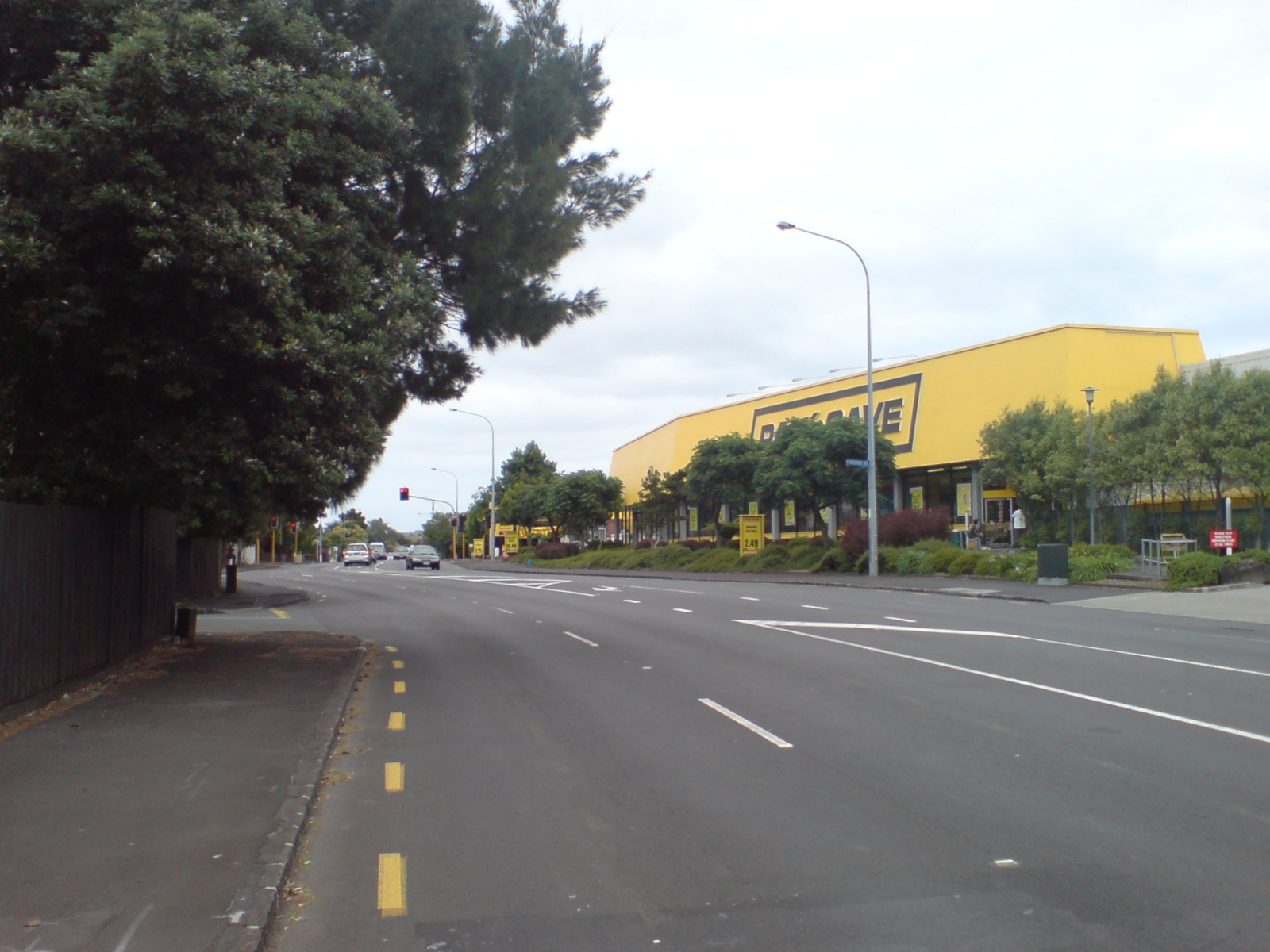
- Pak'nSave supermarket on New North Road
- Interactive map of Ōwairaka
- Coordinates: 36°53′42″S 174°43′18″E
- Country: New Zealand
- City: Auckland
- Local authority: Auckland Council
- Electoral ward: Albert-Eden-Puketāpapa ward
- Local board: Albert-Eden Local Board

Area
  - Land: 140 ha (350 acres)

Population (June 2025)
  - Total: 6,000
  - Density: 4,300/km^{2} (11,000/sq mi)

Waterview	Mount Albert	St Lukes
Avondale	Ōwairaka	Sandringham
New Windsor	New Windsor	Wesley

Ōwairaka is a suburb of New Zealand's largest city, Auckland. It is under the local governance of the Auckland Council. The area was primarily rural until the 1930s, when the area experienced suburban growth. Ōwairaka is known for the Owairaka Athletic Club, a club that came to prominence in the 1960s, due to the success of coach Arthur Lydiard and athletes Murray Halberg and Peter Snell.

== Geography ==
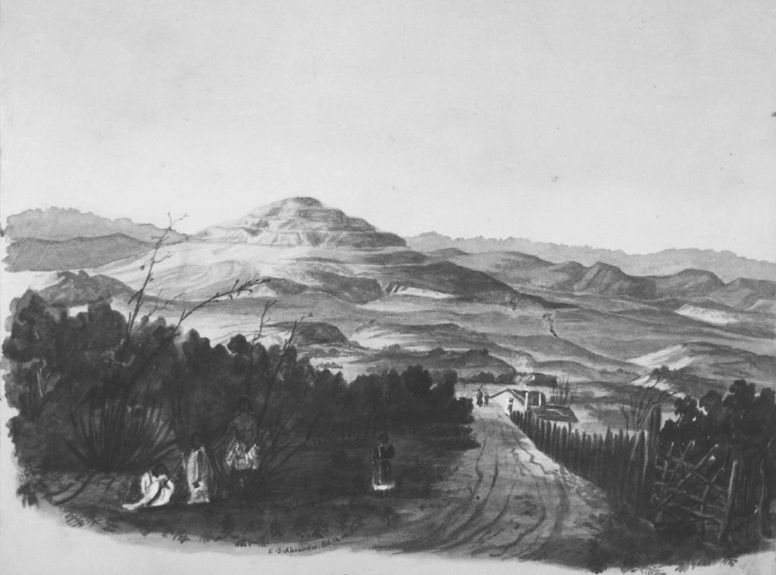
A watercolour of Ōwairaka / Mount Albert and the Waitākere Ranges in the 1840s

Ōwairaka is the southern portion of the old Mount Roskill borough, bordered in the south by the Oakley Creek and the Southwestern Motorway. The volcanic peak Ōwairaka / Mount Albert is to the north of the suburb. Major roads in the area include New North Road, Richardson Road and Owairaka Avenue.

== History ==
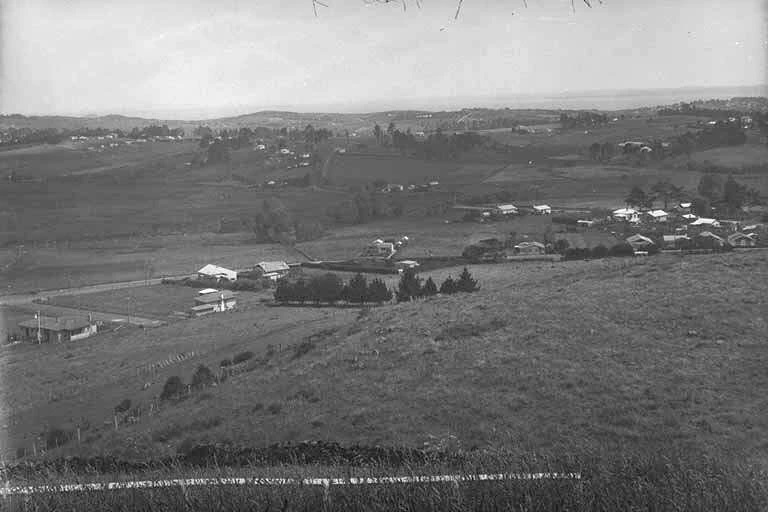
Owairaka Avenue in the 1920s, when the area was predominantly rural

Ōwairaka is a name for the volcanic hill Ōwairaka / Mount Albert. The name refers to Wairaka, an early Māori ancestor, who was the daughter of Toroa, the captain of the Mātaatua voyaging waka. Wairaka fled to Auckland to escape an unwanted marriage, and established her people on the volcano.

During the early 18th century, the Auckland isthmus was heavily populated by the Waiohua confederation of tribes. Ōwairaka / Mount Albert was the western-most hill-top pā of Waiohua and had extensive terraces and cultivations, although not as many as Maungakiekie or Maungawhau to the east. After a conflict between Waiohua and Ngāti Whātua in the mid-18th century, the area became part of the rohe of Ngāti Whātua. Ngāti Whātua had a much smaller population than the Waiohua, and seaside areas were preferred places to live. Because of this, much of the area fell into disuse.

On 29 June 1841, Ōwairaka was sold to the Crown by Ngāti Whātua, as a part of a 12,000 acre section. The terrain of the area was rough, meaning the area saw slower development compared to other parts of the Auckland isthmus. In the 1860s, New North Road was established as road access for the area and as an alternative to the Great North Road to the north. In October 1866, the Mt Albert District Highway Board, the first local government in the area, was formed to administer New North Road and surrounding areas.

On 10 September 1929, the first school opened in the area. Known as Richardson Road School, the name was changed to Owairaka School in 1930 after a petition by school parents.

In the early 20th century, trams drove suburban growth along New North Road. While most of the other suburbs along New North Road received tram stations in the 1910s, it took until 1936 until the Owairaka tram terminus was opened. From the late 1930s, state housing projects began to populate the Ōwairaka area, and by 1940s the suburb was a mis of rural areas and suburban housing.

In 1943, the Owairaka Athletic Club was established at Anderson Park, before moving to the Lovelock Track in Mount Roskill in 1961. During the 1960s the club came to prominence in middle- and long-distance running under coach Arthur Lydiard, producing international and national champions including Murray Halberg and the New Zealand Athlete of the Century, Peter Snell.

Ōwairaka became a centre for Māori and Pasifika communities in the 1970s, after gentrification caused families to move from Auckland's central suburbs. During the 1990s and 2000s, the area developed as a centre for the Chinese and Somali communities.

== Demographics ==
Ōwairaka covers 1.40 km^{2} (0.54 sq mi) and had an estimated population of 6,000 as of June 2025, with a population density of 4,286 people per km^{2}.

Historical population
Year	Pop.	±% p.a.
2006	4,941	—
2013	5,280	+0.95%
2018	5,634	+1.31%
2023	5,256	−1.38%
The 2006 population is for a smaller area of 1.32 km^{2}. Source:

Ōwairaka had a population of 5,256 in the 2023 New Zealand census, a decrease of 378 people (−6.7%) since the 2018 census, and a decrease of 24 people (−0.5%) since the 2013 census. There were 2,643 males, 2,589 females and 24 people of other genders in 1,836 dwellings. 4.7% of people identified as LGBTIQ+. There were 975 people (18.6%) aged under 15 years, 1,260 (24.0%) aged 15 to 29, 2,571 (48.9%) aged 30 to 64, and 453 (8.6%) aged 65 or older.

People could identify as more than one ethnicity. The results were 43.1% European (Pākehā); 9.4% Māori; 17.2% Pasifika; 37.9% Asian; 6.0% Middle Eastern, Latin American and African New Zealanders (MELAA); and 1.0% other, which includes people giving their ethnicity as "New Zealander". English was spoken by 91.4%, Māori language by 2.1%, Samoan by 4.2%, and other languages by 33.5%. No language could be spoken by 2.4% (e.g. too young to talk). New Zealand Sign Language was known by 0.3%. The percentage of people born overseas was 46.8, compared with 28.8% nationally.

Religious affiliations were 33.3% Christian, 6.8% Hindu, 7.3% Islam, 0.4% Māori religious beliefs, 1.9% Buddhist, 0.3% New Age, 0.2% Jewish, and 1.8% other religions. People who answered that they had no religion were 43.0%, and 5.1% of people did not answer the census question.

Of those at least 15 years old, 1,686 (39.4%) people had a bachelor's or higher degree, 1,563 (36.5%) had a post-high school certificate or diploma, and 1,038 (24.2%) people exclusively held high school qualifications. 621 people (14.5%) earned over $100,000 compared to 12.1% nationally. The employment status of those at least 15 was that 2,499 (58.4%) people were employed full-time, 483 (11.3%) were part-time, and 156 (3.6%) were unemployed.

Individual statistical areas
Name	Area (km^{2})	Population	Density (per km^{2})	Dwellings	Median age	Median income
Ōwairaka West	0.92	3,015	3,277	1,086	33.2 years	$50,200
Ōwairaka East	0.48	2,241	4,669	750	33.8 years	$45,900
New Zealand					38.1 years	$41,500

== Amenities ==
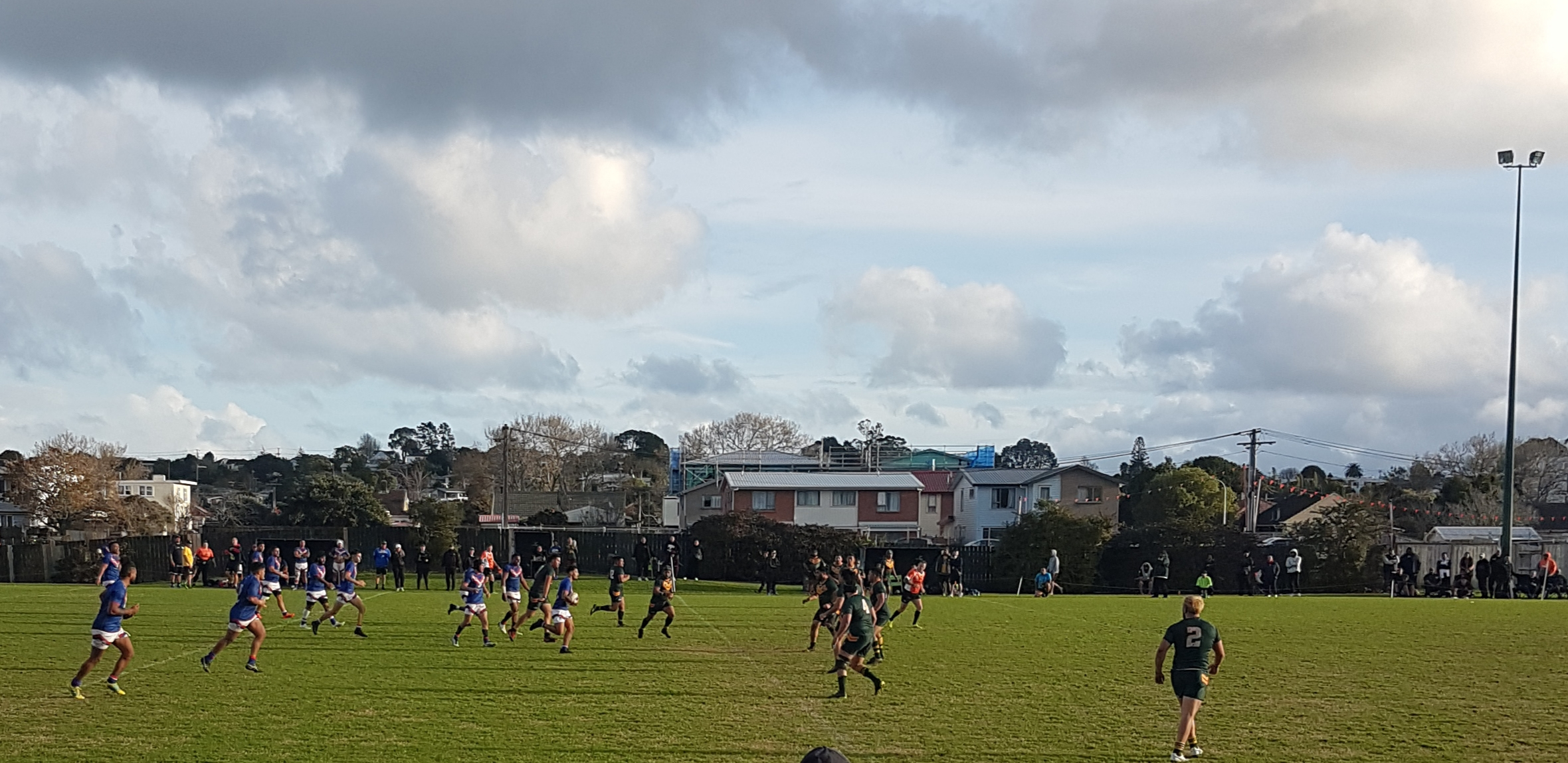
Marist Saints facing the Te Atatu Roosters at Murray Halberg Park

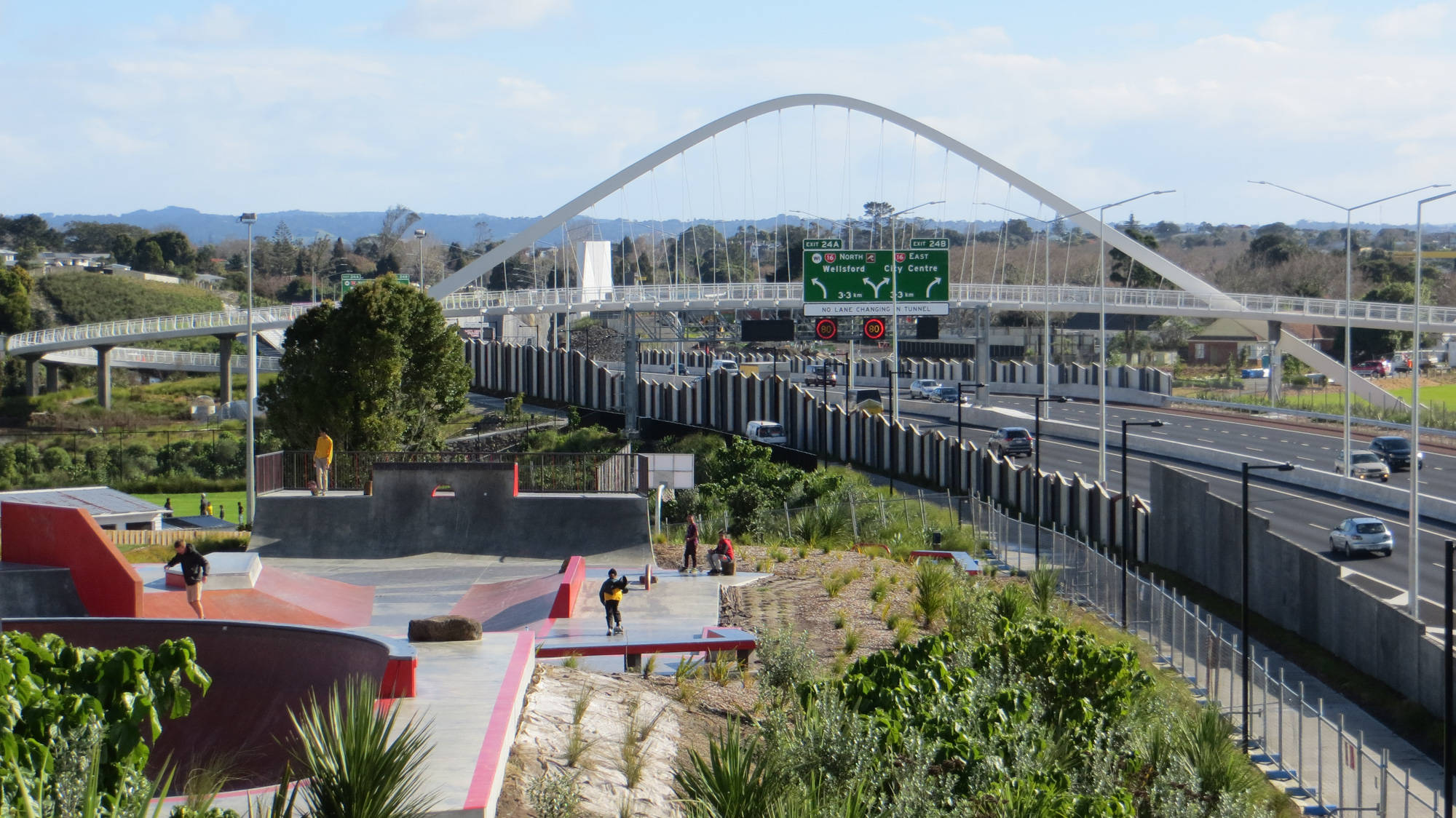
Te Whitinga Footbridge

- Anderson Park, the home of the Mount Albert-Ponsonby association football club.
- Murray Halberg Park, the home of rugby league club Marist Saints and the Owairaka Sea Scouts.
- Ōwairaka Community Hub, a community club which closed in 2022.
- Owairaka Park, home to the Owairaka Athletic Club
- Te Whitinga Footbridge (formerly known as the Hendon Footbridge), a bridge across the Southwestern Motorway that opened in 2017, connecting Kukuwai Park in Ōwairaka to the suburb of New Windsor to the south-west.

== Education ==
Ōwairaka District School is a coeducational contributing primary (years 1–6) school with a roll of 384 as of July 2026. The local state secondary school is Mount Albert Grammar School.

== Local government ==
In October 1866, the Mt Albert District Highway Board, the first local government in the area, was formed to administer New North Road and surrounding areas. In 1911, the board became the Mount Albert Borough, who elected a mayor. In 1978, Mount Albert became a city, and in 1989 it was absorbed into Auckland City. In November 2010, all cities and districts of the Auckland Region were amalgamated into a single body, governed by the Auckland Council.

Ōwairaka is a part of the Albert-Eden local board area. The residents of Albert-Eden elect a local board, and two councillors from the Albert-Eden-Puketāpapa ward to sit on the Auckland Council.

== Climate ==
Climate data for Ōwairaka (1991–2020 normals, extremes 1949–2008)
Month	Jan	Feb	Mar	Apr	May	Jun	Jul	Aug	Sep	Oct	Nov	Dec	Year
Record high °C (°F)	28.7 (83.7)	30.5 (86.9)	28.7 (83.7)	26.7 (80.1)	24.4 (75.9)	21.1 (70.0)	20.0 (68.0)	20.0 (68.0)	21.5 (70.7)	23.5 (74.3)	25.3 (77.5)	27.8 (82.0)	30.5 (86.9)
Mean daily maximum °C (°F)	23.5 (74.3)	24.0 (75.2)	22.7 (72.9)	20.4 (68.7)	18.0 (64.4)	15.7 (60.3)	14.9 (58.8)	15.4 (59.7)	16.7 (62.1)	17.9 (64.2)	19.6 (67.3)	21.8 (71.2)	19.2 (66.6)
Daily mean °C (°F)	19.4 (66.9)	20.0 (68.0)	18.6 (65.5)	16.4 (61.5)	14.3 (57.7)	12.1 (53.8)	11.1 (52.0)	11.6 (52.9)	12.8 (55.0)	14.3 (57.7)	15.8 (60.4)	18.0 (64.4)	15.4 (59.7)
Mean daily minimum °C (°F)	15.4 (59.7)	16.0 (60.8)	14.5 (58.1)	12.4 (54.3)	10.6 (51.1)	8.4 (47.1)	7.2 (45.0)	7.7 (45.9)	9.0 (48.2)	10.6 (51.1)	12.0 (53.6)	14.3 (57.7)	11.5 (52.7)
Record low °C (°F)	6.8 (44.2)	6.9 (44.4)	2.0 (35.6)	2.1 (35.8)	0.0 (32.0)	−2.5 (27.5)	−2.3 (27.9)	−1.3 (29.7)	0.2 (32.4)	2.2 (36.0)	4.1 (39.4)	5.2 (41.4)	−2.5 (27.5)
Average rainfall mm (inches)	73.7 (2.90)	65.6 (2.58)	90.5 (3.56)	101.8 (4.01)	108.5 (4.27)	124.1 (4.89)	146.8 (5.78)	116.0 (4.57)	103.0 (4.06)	100.8 (3.97)	89.8 (3.54)	92.6 (3.65)	1,213.2 (47.78)
Source: NIWA (rainfall 1981–2010)

== Bibliography ==
- Dunsford, Deborah (2016). Mt Albert Then and Now: a History of Mt Albert, Morningside, Kingsland, St Lukes, Sandringham and Owairaka. Auckland: Mount Albert Historical Society. ISBN 978-0-473-36016-0. OCLC 964695277. Wikidata Q117189974.
