= 1966 Birthday Honours (New Zealand) =

Awards list for New Zealand

The 1966 Queen's Birthday Honours in New Zealand, celebrating the official birthday of Elizabeth II, were appointments made by the Queen on the advice of the New Zealand government to various orders and honours to reward and highlight good works by New Zealanders. They were announced on 11 June 1966.

The recipients of honours are displayed here as they were styled before their new honour.

== Knight Bachelor ==
- James Wattie CBE – of Hastings. For services to industry and the export trade.

== Order of the Bath ==
=== Companion (CB) ===
Military division

- Major-General Walter Sneddon McKinnon CBE – Generals' List, New Zealand Regular Force.

== Order of Saint Michael and Saint George ==
=== Companion (CMG) ===
- Douglas William Ashley Barker – Secretary to the Treasury.
- Lieutenant-Colonel Stanley Livingstone Wilson DSO MB FRCS – of Dunedin. For valuable services to surgery and medical education.

== Order of the British Empire ==
=== Dame Commander (DBE) ===
Civil division

- Edith Ngaio Marsh OBE – of Christchurch. For distinguished services in the arts, especially writing and theatre production.
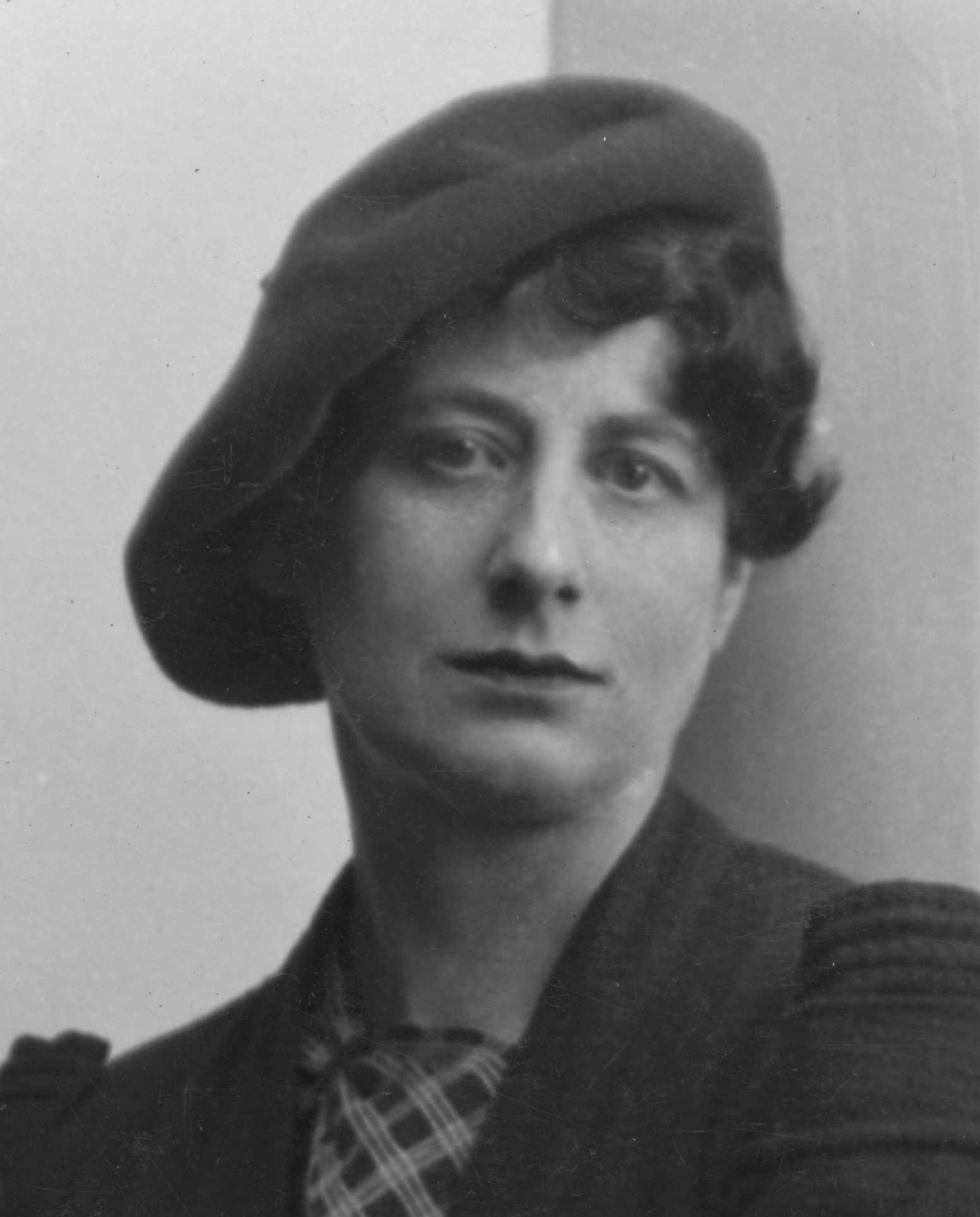
Dame Ngaio Marsh

=== Commander (CBE) ===
Civil division

- Francis Malcolm Corkill – of Invercargill. For valuable services to civil engineering.
- John Barnett Darnell – Director-General of the New Zealand Post Office.
- James Clendon Tau Henare DSO – of Motatau. For services to the Māori people.
- Frank Andrew Reeves – of Auckland. For services to aviation.

Military division

- Air Commodore Albert Samuel Agar AFC – Royal New Zealand Air Force.
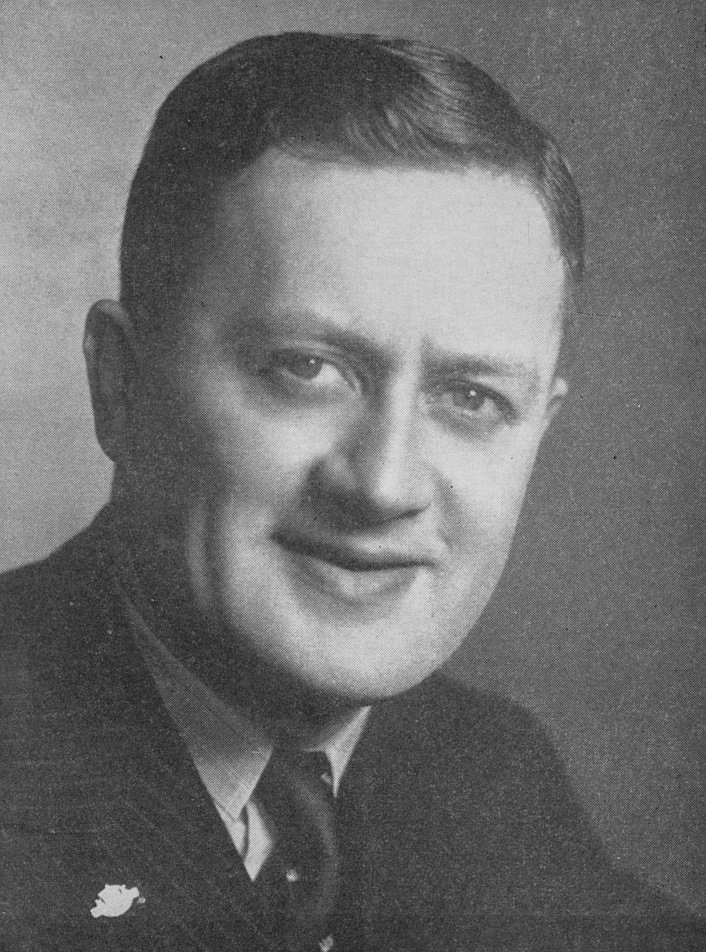
James Henare

=== Officer (OBE) ===
Civil division

- Annie Rose Allum – headmistress of the New Plymouth Girls' High School.
- Lewis Edward Henry Baigent – of Nelson. For services to the saw-milling industry and to community affairs.
- Arthur Bartrum Baker – of Leamington. For services to farming in New Zealand.
- The Honourable Thomas Bloodworth – of Auckland. For services to local government.
- James Collins – of Christchurch. For services to cultural and social affairs, especially as chairman of the Pan-Pacific Arts Festival.
- Lionel Corkill – director of the Grasslands Division, Department of Scientific and Industrial Research.
- Keith Wilson Hay – mayor of Mount Roskill.
- Raniera te Tawhiti Kingi JP – of Rotorua. For services to the Māori people, particularly as secretary of the Arawa Trust Board.
- Jack Meltzer MBE – of Wellington. For services as general secretary of the Police Association and to the community.
- Audrey Alice Hastings Orbell – director of the Division of Nursing, Department of Health.
- Roy Samuel Whiteside MB ChB. For services to the community, especially as mayor of Waiuku.
- Henry Robert Wise – of Oamaru. For services to the farming industry and the farming community.

Military division

- Commander Philip Leslie Bardwell – Royal New Zealand Navy.
- Lieutenant-Colonel Robert Maynard Gurr MBE – Royal New Zealand Infantry Regiment (Regular Force).
- Wing Commander Raymond George Jeffs – Royal New Zealand Air Force.
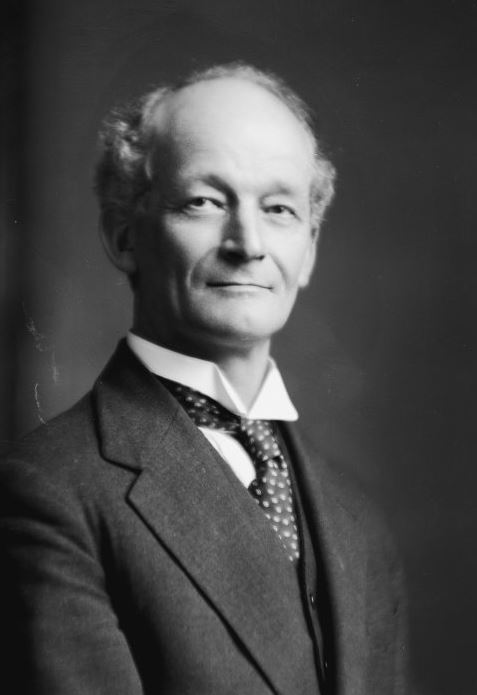
Tom Bloodworth

=== Member (MBE) ===
Civil division

- John Burley Barnett – of Blenheim. For services to local government and to farming, especially the dairying industry.
- Harry Beaumont – lately mayor of Manurewa.
- Dorothy Constance Blomfield JP – of Hamilton. For services in the fields of social welfare and local government.
- John Frederick Boynton JP – of Waimana. For services to the Māori people.
- Pearl Doreen Brown – honorary secretary of the Christchurch Ladies' Amateur Swimming and Life-Saving Club.
- Edward George Buckley – superintendent, Auckland Prison.
- Mary Frances Gallagher – of Wellington. For services in the field of pre-school education.
- Hans Charles Hankey JP – mayor of Gore.
- Margaret Dorothy Hartridge – of Christchurch. For services in the field of cerebral palsy therapy.
- Gordon Stanley Leeder – of Wellington. For services to athletics, especially as president of the New Zealand Amateur Athletic Association.
- Leslie Cochrane Logan JP. For services to local government, especially as chairman of Raglan County Council.
- Arthur William Sharland Longley JP – of Pōrangahau. For services to local government and farming.
- Kenneth William Low – lately mayor of Te Kūiti.
- Alfred Ernest Garfield Lyttle. For services to farming and to community welfare in North Canterbury.
- Archibald Manning – of Timaru. For services to education.
- Eric Wyndham Merewether – of Wanganui. For services to local government and the community, especially in connection with the Returned Services' Association.
- Evelyn Mary Rawlins – of Palmerston North. For services in the field of music for many years.
- The Reverend Alan Douglas Robertson. For services to the community, especially in connection with the Presbyterian Social Services Association of Auckland.
- David Howie Scott. For services to local government, particularly as chairman of the Waitaki County Council.

Military division

- Acting Commander William Lambert Rudd – Royal New Zealand Navy.
- Major Donald Richard Kenning – Royal New Zealand Artillery (Regular Force).
- Major Stanley Redvers McKeon – Royal New Zealand Infantry Regiment (Regular Force).
- Warrant Officer Class I Peter Edward Roberts – Royal New Zealand Dental Corps (Territorial Force).
- Major John Lindsay Smith – Royal New Zealand Artillery (Regular Force).
- Squadron Leader Allen Fisher Lissette – Royal New Zealand Air Force.
- Flight Lieutenant William Thomas Saunders – Royal New Zealand Air Force.

== Companion of the Imperial Service Order (ISO) ==
- Percy Moston Outhwaite – Under-Secretary of Mines.
- Harry Parsonage – Secretary of Labour.

== British Empire Medal (BEM) ==
Civil division, for gallantry

- Albert John Haines – second officer, Auckland Prison. For courage and devotion to duty during riots in Auckland Prison.
- Cornelis Hofker – instructor, Auckland Prison. For courage and devotion to duty during riots in Auckland Prison.
- Frank Poultney – first officer, Christchurch Prison. For courage and devotion to duty during prison riots in Christchurch.
- Alan Alexander Thomson – officer, Paparua Prison, Christchurch. For courage and devotion to duty during prison riots in Christchurch.

Civil division

- Muriel Alice Brendon. For services in connection with Children's Health Lunch Service.
- Cyril Patrick Burns – detective, New Zealand Police Force.
- Bertram William Churchill JP – captain, Volunteer Fire Police Corps, Wellington.
- Christina Patricia Forbes – matron, Special School, Otekaieke, Oamuru.

Military division

- Chief Petty Officer Jack Hern Baigent – Royal New Zealand Navy.
- Chief Engine Room Artificer John Robert Howe – Royal New Zealand Navy.
- Chief Signalman Leslie Clifford Thorpe – Royal New Zealand Navy.
- Chief Electrician Harold Ernest Vincent – Royal New Zealand Navy.
- Sergeant Eric Ball – New Zealand Special Air Service (Regular Force).
- Sergeant William Frederick Giles – Royal New Zealand Artillery (Regular Force).
- Corporal Iain Cameron McFarlane – Royal New Zealand Infantry Regiment (Regular Force).
- Flight Sergeant John Campbell Jekyll – Royal New Zealand Air Force.
- Flight Sergeant Russell Hewitt Thompson – Royal New Zealand Air Force.
- Sergeant William Elwin Larking – Royal New Zealand Air Force.

== Air Force Cross (AFC) ==
- Squadron Leader Robert Bruce Craigie – Royal New Zealand Air Force.
- Squadron Leader John Alan Scrimshaw – Royal New Zealand Air Force.

== Queen's Police Medal (QPM) ==
- James Ludwig Graham – chief superintendent, New Zealand Police Force.
- Joseph Geoffrey Long – detective senior sergeant, New Zealand Police Force.
