= David Hay (Auckland politician) =

New Zealand mayor & businessman (b1947/8)

David Hay CNZM
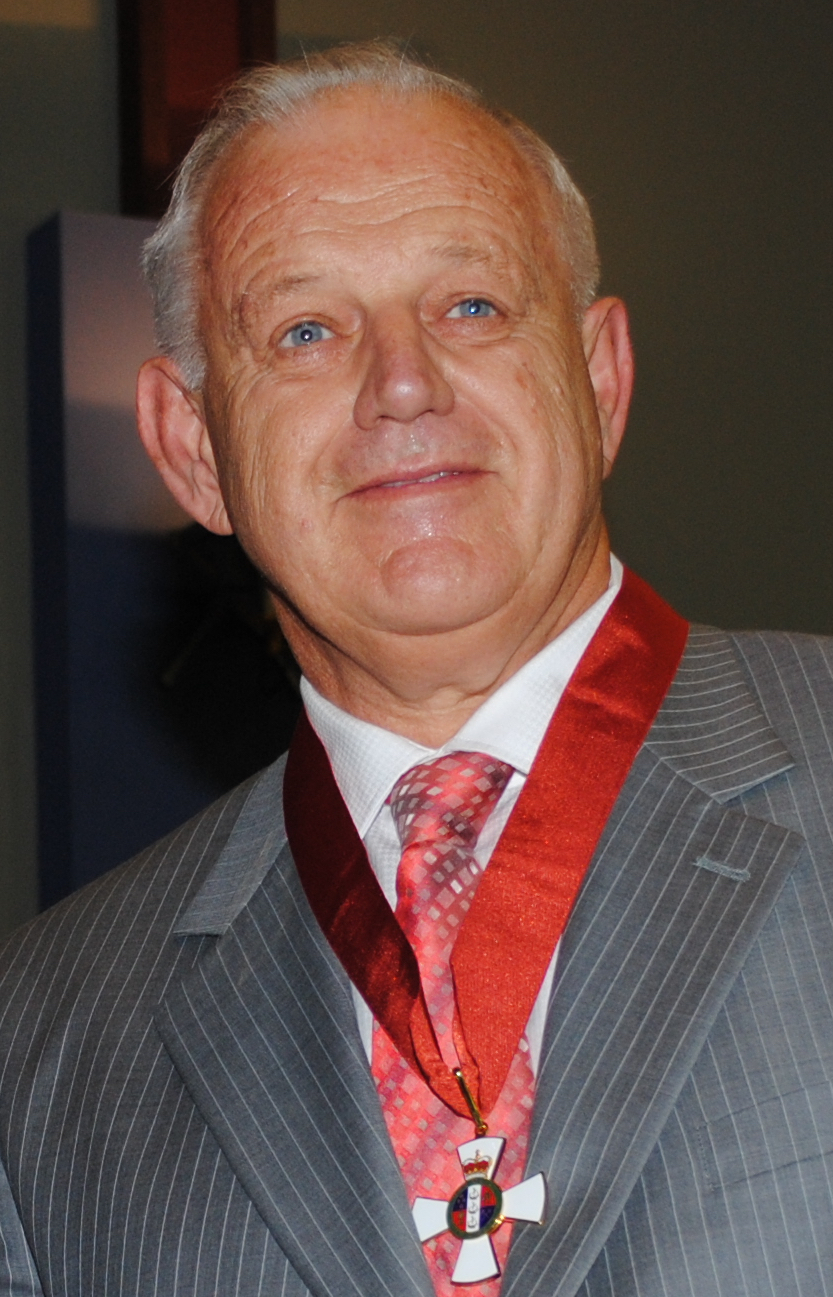
- Hay in 2011

21st Deputy Mayor of Auckland
- In office 1991–1998
- Preceded by: Phil Warren
- Succeeded by: Bruce Hucker
- In office 2001–2004
- Preceded by: Bruce Hucker
- Succeeded by: Bruce Hucker
- In office 2007–2010
- Preceded by: Bruce Hucker

Personal details
- Born: 1947/1948 Auckland, New Zealand
- Relations: Keith Hay (father)
- Education: University of Auckland

David John Hay CNZM (born 1947 or 1948) is a New Zealand politician and businessman. He served as mayor of Mt Roskill from 1987 to 1989, and deputy mayor of Auckland City on three occasions (1991–1998, 2001–2004, and 2007–2010). He was also an Auckland Regional Councillor between 2004 and 2007. He is the managing director of Keith Hay Homes Limited, founded by his father.

== Early life and family ==
Born in 1947 or 1948, Hay is the son of Keith Wilson Hay, the founder of Keith Hay Homes Ltd, and Enid Marjorie Hay (née Paris). He attended Mount Roskill Grammar School, and graduated from the University of Auckland with a commerce degree, and obtained accountancy and chartered secretarial qualifications from Auckland Institute of Technology.

== Local-body politics ==
In 1983, Hay was elected as a member of the Mount Roskill Borough Council, and served as mayor of that borough between 1987 and 1989, when it was absorbed into Auckland City. He was subsequently elected to the Auckland City Council on the Citizens & Ratepayers ticket, and served as deputy mayor between 1991 and 1998 under Les Mills, and from 2001 to 2004 and 2007 to 2010 under John Banks.

His achievements on council included the restoration of the Civic Theatre and the establishment of Metrowater, and he supported the formation of the Auckland supercity. In the early 1990s, Hay opposed the gay pride 'Hero parade' on the grounds of taste and public decency, stating: "If it was the Girl Guides behaving like that, I'd object." Hay was elected to the Auckland Regional Council in 2004, and served one three-year term. He did not seek election to the new Auckland Council in 2010.

== Business career ==
Hay has been involved with the housing construction company founded by his father, Keith Hay Homes Limited, since 1972, rising to become managing director of the firm.

== Honours ==
In the 2011 New Year Honours, Hay was appointed a Companion of the New Zealand Order of Merit for services to local-body affairs and the community.

== Personality and beliefs ==
Hay is known for his dry sense of humour and Christian values and principles.
