= South Western Motorway =

South Western Motorway may refer to:

- M5 South-West Motorway, in Sydney, New South Wales, Australia
- South Western Freeway, the former name for Hume Motorway in Sydney, New South Wales, Australia
- Southwestern Motorway, in Auckland, New Zealand
