= Hillsborough, Auckland =

Hillsborough
- Suburb
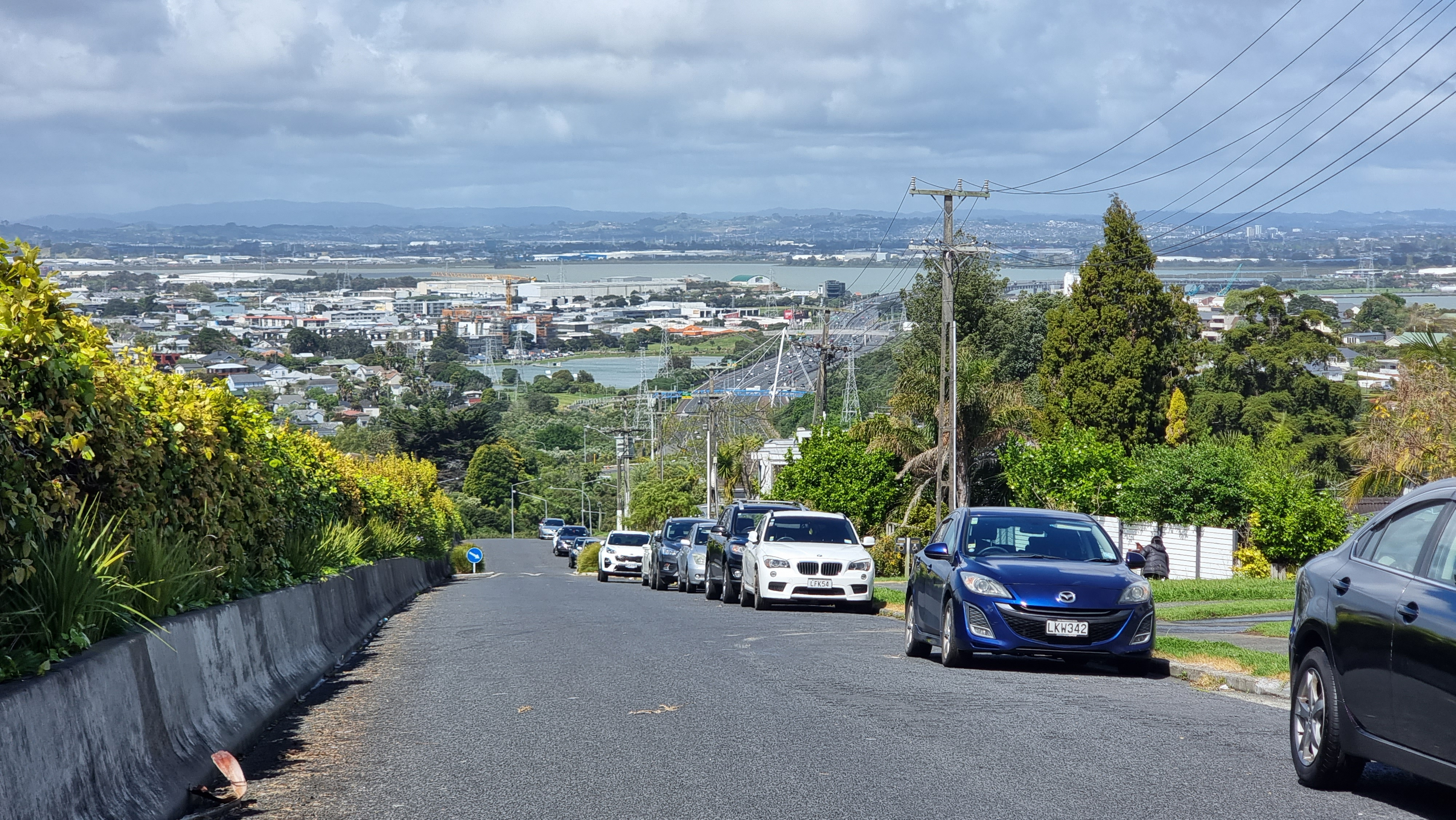
- View from Hillsborough looking towards Onehunga
- Interactive map of Hillsborough
- Coordinates: 36°55′20″S 174°45′09″E
- Country: New Zealand
- City: Auckland
- Local authority: Auckland Council
- Electoral ward: Albert-Eden-Puketāpapa ward
- Local board: Puketāpapa Local Board

Area
  - Land: 251 ha (620 acres)

Population (June 2025)
  - Total: 7,470
  - Density: 2,980/km^{2} (7,710/sq mi)

Mount Roskill	Three Kings	Royal Oak
Waikōwhai	Hillsborough	Onehunga
(Manukau Harbour)	(Manukau Harbour)	(Manukau Harbour)

Hillsborough is a suburb of Auckland, New Zealand. It is under the local governance of the Auckland Council. Hillsborough is a leafy suburb of 20th-century houses. The area is serviced by two shopping areas; Onehunga and Three Kings. The area is served by secondary schools Mount Roskill Grammar School and Marcellin College.

== History ==
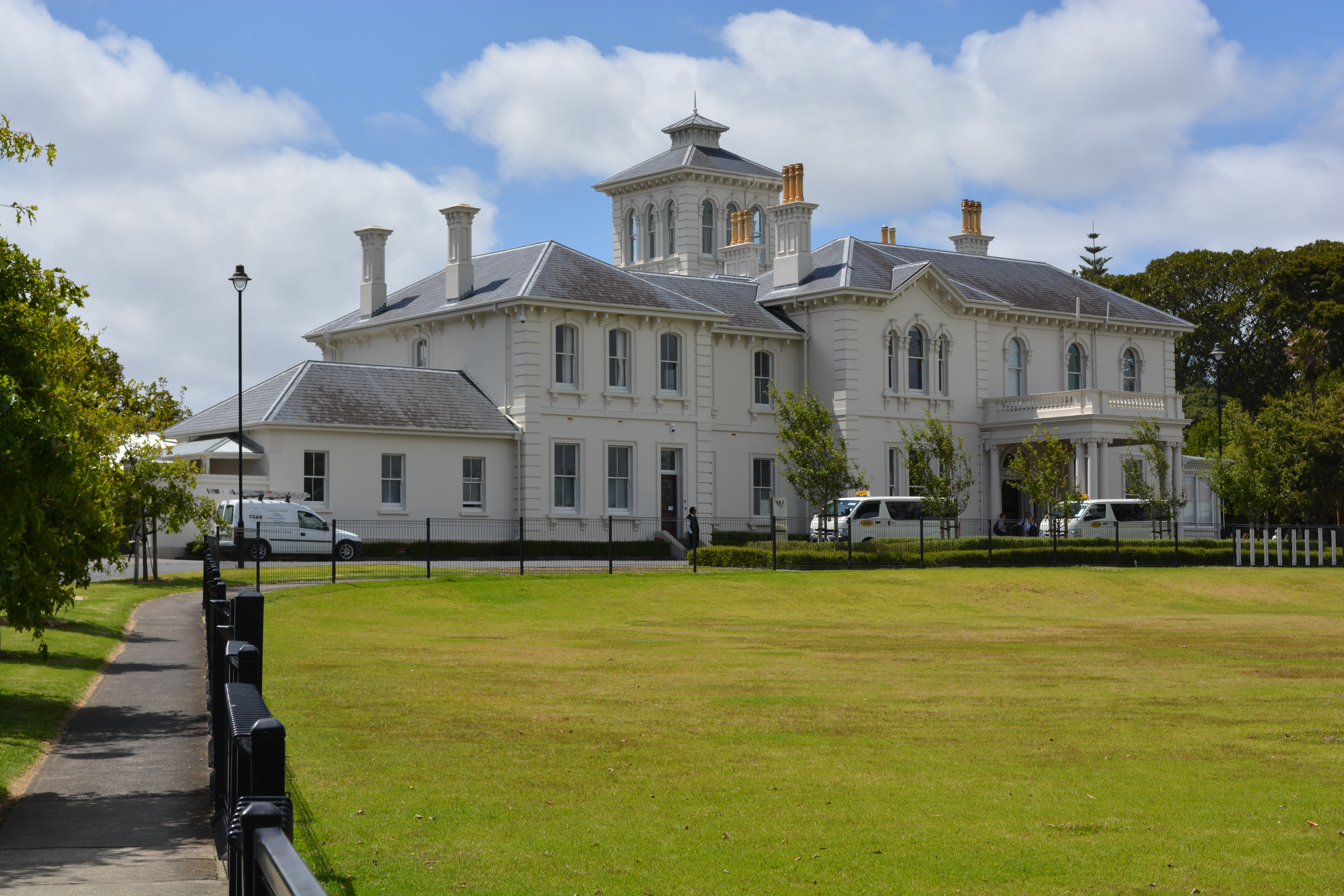
The Pah Homestead

Since the mid-18th century, the Auckland isthmus has been within the rohe of Ngāti Whātua Ōrākei. The south-eastern Hillsborough area near the Manukau Harbour was traditionally referred to as Rangiaowhia, the name of a settlement and waka landing site south of Onehunga High School which was partially covered up by the construction of State Highway 20 in 1975. The name may reference the view of the cloudy sky above the high point of the Hillsborough ridge, Pukekāroro. The northern area of modern-day Hillsborough was known as Koheraunui, referencing the kohekohe trees which were once common in the lava forest landscape of the area, and was known for its kūmara (sweet potato) cultivations.

After the Musket Wars of the 1820s, Ngāti Whātua Ōrākei gave lands near Onehunga to the Tainui confederation of the Waikato as a tuku rangatira, a gift of reciprocity to thank the Waikato tribes for sheltering them during the war, and as a way to forge closer bonds. In the 1830s, Pōtatau Te Wherowhero, a powerful Tainui chief who later became the first Māori King, would spend time in various places around the Manukau Harbour and Auckland isthmus, including at Koheraunui in Hillsborough (modern-day Monte Cecilia). Pōtatau Te Wherowhero and his brother Kati Takiwaru occupied Koheraunui until 1840, when they settled at coastal Māngere. Pōtatau Te Wherowhero and Tāmati Ngāpora sold the land with the consent of Ngāti Whātua Ōrākei chief Apihai Te Kawau to English land-dealer William Hart in December 1844.

The suburb was named for James Carlton Hill, who left land to the city for use as public domains in his 1858 will. The Pah Homestead (or The Pah) was constructed for James Williamson by Edward Mahoney on the 313-acre estate Pah Farm in 1877–1879. Of plastered brick in the Italianate style it is based upon Queen Victoria and Prince Albert's house Osbourne House in the Isle of Wight. It was allegedly the largest house ever built in New Zealand and one of the most expensive. The Pah Mansion was eventually purchased by the Roman Catholic Church in 1913 and renamed Monte Cecilia. Part of the remaining land close to the house was developed as Monte Cecilia Primary School, and the house itself was used as emergency housing for many years. The Auckland City Council purchased the property in 2002.

Following the failure of Williamson's business concerns after the stockmarket crash of 1886, the estate was progressively broken up and sold off. Various organisations established facilities on the smaller but still spacious properties that resulted from the subdivision; a Franciscan Friary, Marcellin College for boys, Roskill Masonic Hospital, and Liston Village (a residential home which includes the historic Pah Stable Block). Other parts of the property were purchased by the Hillsborough Bowling Club, The Church of Jesus Christ of Latter-day Saints who built a church on Pah Road, Sanitarium Wholefoods and Holeproof Enterprises who built factories on Pah Road and Auckland City Council who created Seymour Park. The rest of the extensive farmland was redeveloped as suburban housing although a portion to the south of Herd Road is still utilised for grazing land probably because it is very steep. The two storied Farm Managers House still stands at 1 Warren Avenue.

== Landmarks and features ==
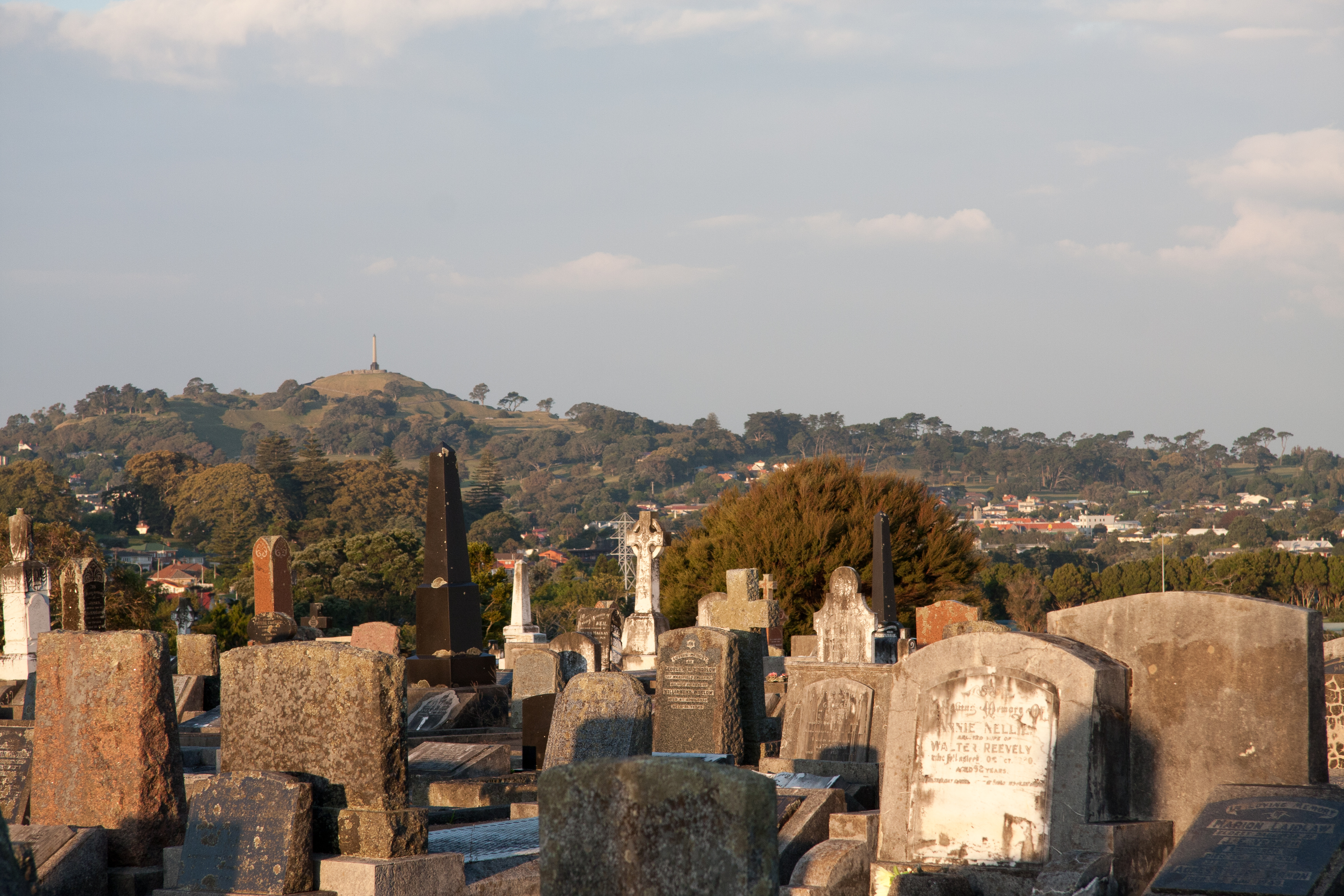
Hillsborough Cemetery

- Hillsborough Cemetery, a major cemetery in Auckland primarily in use between 1916 and 1976, located on the Hillsborough ridge
- Monte Cecilia Park, a large public park in Hillsborough
- Pah Homestead, a historic homestead and art gallery
- The northern coastline of the Manukau Harbour, which includes Grannys Bay, Taylors Bay and Hillsborough Bay
- St Francis Retreat Centre, a historic friary that opened in 1940.
- The Waikōwhai Walkway, a 10 km (6.2 mi) path linking Onehunga to Lynfield Cove.

== Demographics ==
Hillsborough covers 2.51 km^{2} (0.97 sq mi) and had an estimated population of 7,470 as of June 2025, with a population density of 2,976 people per km^{2}.

Historical population
Year	Pop.	±% p.a.
2006	10,575	—
2013	5,919	−7.96%
2018	6,846	+2.95%
2023	6,891	+0.13%
The 2006 population is for a larger area of 3.92 km^{2}. Source:

Hillsborough (Auckland) had a population of 6,891 in the 2023 New Zealand census, an increase of 45 people (0.7%) since the 2018 census, and an increase of 972 people (16.4%) since the 2013 census. There were 3,420 males, 3,447 females and 24 people of other genders in 2,268 dwellings. 3.4% of people identified as LGBTIQ+. The median age was 38.0 years (compared with 38.1 years nationally). There were 1,113 people (16.2%) aged under 15 years, 1,500 (21.8%) aged 15 to 29, 3,141 (45.6%) aged 30 to 64, and 1,140 (16.5%) aged 65 or older.

People could identify as more than one ethnicity. The results were 43.8% European (Pākehā); 6.8% Māori; 9.6% Pasifika; 46.5% Asian; 3.3% Middle Eastern, Latin American and African New Zealanders (MELAA); and 1.3% other, which includes people giving their ethnicity as "New Zealander". English was spoken by 93.3%, Māori language by 1.3%, Samoan by 1.8%, and other languages by 34.9%. No language could be spoken by 2.2% (e.g. too young to talk). New Zealand Sign Language was known by 0.4%. The percentage of people born overseas was 46.7, compared with 28.8% nationally.

Religious affiliations were 35.3% Christian, 12.5% Hindu, 5.1% Islam, 0.3% Māori religious beliefs, 2.7% Buddhist, 0.3% New Age, 0.1% Jewish, and 2.1% other religions. People who answered that they had no religion were 37.0%, and 4.9% of people did not answer the census question.

Of those at least 15 years old, 2,334 (40.4%) people had a bachelor's or higher degree, 2,244 (38.8%) had a post-high school certificate or diploma, and 1,200 (20.8%) people exclusively held high school qualifications. The median income was $47,000, compared with $41,500 nationally. 918 people (15.9%) earned over $100,000 compared to 12.1% nationally. The employment status of those at least 15 was that 3,138 (54.3%) people were employed full-time, 711 (12.3%) were part-time, and 132 (2.3%) were unemployed.

Individual statistical areas
Name	Area (km^{2})	Population	Density (per km^{2})	Dwellings	Median age	Median income
Hillsborough North	0.72	1,653	2,296	654	43.6 years	$37,300
Hillsborough Central	0.63	2,469	3,919	747	34.9 years	$49,500
Hillsborough South	1.16	2,769	2,387	864	37.9 years	$50,800
New Zealand					38.1 years	$41,500

== Education ==
Hillsborough School is a coeducational contributing primary school (years 1-6) with a roll of 353 as of July 2026. The school opened in 1951.
