= Julian Sewell =

New Zealand comedian and digital satirist (born 1996)

- Born: 2 February 1996 (age 30); Hong Kong
- Education: Curtin University; Victoria University of Wellington
- Occupations: Comedian; digital satirist
- Years active: 2021–present
- Known for: Comedy sketches; portrayal of fictional actress Paloma Diamond
- Spouse: Logan Church (m. 2025)

TikTok information
- Page: juliansewell
- Followers: 2.1 million
- Last updated: March 20, 2025

Julian Sewell (born 2 February 1996) is a New Zealand comedian and digital satirist. He is known for his short-form comedy sketches and for portraying the fictional actress Paloma Diamond. He first gained attention in 2021 with a spoof of Queen Elizabeth II's Christmas message, launching his career in online satire. He is known for his use of costumes and the extensive collection of wigs to support his varied character portrayals.

== Early life ==
Sewell was born and raised in Hong Kong. He completed his bachelors degree at Curtin University, Perth, and his masters at Victoria University of Wellington. He taught English at Aorere College and worked at Mount Roskill Grammar School, both located in Auckland.

== Career ==
Sewell began posting comedy sketches in 2021. His viral spoof of Queen Elizabeth II's Christmas message was widely circulated and led to the creation of his signature character, Paloma Diamond. This fictional actress appears in many of his parodies and award-show spoofs. His character work has drawn attention from mainstream media. Coverage by NZEDGE emphasized the significance of his digital persona in redefining online satire, while an article in Emprendedor discussed the business opportunities emerging from his virality. His work was also mentioned in The Guardian Australia as part of a roundup of 2024's funniest viral moments, and The Telegraph noted his growing global appeal. In February 2025, Sewell was interviewed by ABC News’ Will Ganss in character as Paloma Diamond, discussing the (fictional) continuous snubbing of her at the Academy Awards.

== Personal life ==
Sewell is gay. In 2024, he became engaged to Logan Church, the US correspondent for 1News. Sewell and Church got married in November 2025.

== Filmography ==
=== Theater ===
Year	Title	Role	Venue	Notes	Ref.
2026	The 25th Annual Putnam County Spelling Bee	William Barfee	New World Stages	Off-Broadway debut	
