= Roskell =

Roskell is a surname. Notable people with the surname include:

- George Bernard Roskell (1850–1926) Australian architect
- J. S. Roskell (1913–1998), English historian
- Luke Roskell (born 1997), English actor
- Richard Roskell (1817–1883), English Roman Catholic Bishop
- Scott Roskell (born 1969), Australian former rugby league footballer

== See also ==
- Roskill (disambiguation)
