= Keith Hay =

Keith Hay CBE

Mayor of Mount Roskill
- In office 1953–1974

Mount Roskill Borough councillor
- In office 1950–1953

Personal details
- Born: 13 December 1917 Hastings, New Zealand
- Died: 2 January 1997 (aged 79) Grafton
- Spouse: Enid Paris (m. 1942)
- Children: David Hay
- Occupation: Homebuilder, entrepreneur, local body politician

Keith Wilson Hay CBE (13 December 1917 – 2 January 1997) was a New Zealand homebuilder, entrepreneur, local body politician and conservative Christian.

== Early life and family ==
Born in Hastings, Hay was the only son of Scottish immigrant William Hay and Elsie Major, who had married three years previously. In 1930, Hay left school at standard six to split fenceposts for a retired headmaster at Kohukohu, who taught the young man accountancy during the evenings. In 1933, Hay relocated to Auckland and obtained a job at the KDV Morningside box factory. In 1938, he tried to start his own caravan business, but later found that he was more talented at home building.

In 1942, Hay married Enid Paris in Mount Eden, having joined the New Zealand Army Service Corps in 1941. Although he was initially involved in the Mount Eden branch of the New Zealand Labour Party, he unsuccessfully stood as candidate for breakaway Labour MP John A. Lee and his Democratic Labour Party at the 1943 New Zealand general election.

== Local body politics: 1950–1992 ==
At the same time as he relocated his company to Mount Roskill, Hay entered local body politics in that semi-rural borough, becoming first a borough councillor (1950) and then Mayor of Roskill Borough (1953–1974). As Mayor, he sold council plant, contracted out services and constructed amenities. After his retirement as Roskill Mayor, Hay was then elected to the Auckland Regional Council, and also served on the Auckland International Airport Committee. As a civic leader, he was appointed an Officer of the Order of the British Empire in the 1966 Queen's Birthday Honours, and promoted to Commander of the Order of the British Empire, for services to local government and the community, in the 1977 New Year Honours.

== Personality and beliefs ==
Keith Hay was described as an 'enthusiastic ‘arm-waver’ who inspired loyalty, as well as confident, ebullient and generous in nature, with a ‘bullet head, rubicund features and wide, toothy smile’.

He was a devout Presbyterian, and as Mount Roskill mayor he always started his meetings with a prayer service. He was responsible for Mount Roskill's reputation as Auckland's "Bible Belt"; in 1988, there were twenty-six churches for the borough's 35,000 inhabitants.

In 1969, Hay helped to organise a nationwide New Zealand Billy Graham Crusade. 1972, he was a principal organiser for the Marches for Jesus, which involved an estimated 70,000 people. Hay was one of 800,000 New Zealanders to sign a petition opposing the passage of New Zealand's Homosexual Law Reform Act 1986, and established the Coalition of Concerned Citizens along with Sir Peter Tait in 1986.

Hay was also devoted to civic and charity work.

== Death and legacy ==
In 1997, Hay died at Auckland City Hospital, aged seventy-nine. His son, David Hay, later became Auckland City Deputy Mayor under Mayor Les Mills.

There is a park and sports field area, Keith Hay Park in Mt Roskill, named after him. In 2006, Hay was inducted into the New Zealand Business Hall of Fame.
