= Roskelley =

Surname

Roskelley is a surname. Notable people with the name include:

- John Roskelley (born 1948), American mountaineer and author
- Jess Roskelley (1982–2019), American mountaineer, son of John

== See also ==
- Roskill (disambiguation)
