= Coalition of Concerned Citizens =

New Zealand conservative pressure group

The Coalition of Concerned Citizens was a New Zealand Christian conservative pressure group, and one of several attempts to form pro-censorship, anti-abortion, anti-gay and sex education opponents into a comprehensive social conservative political coalition. Its founders included Keith Hay, Peter Tait, Barry Reed, and Bill Subritzky.

== History ==
The CCC was originally formed to fight the New Zealand Homosexual Law Reform Act, although its membership also unsuccessfully tried to defeat David Lange's Fourth Labour Government at the general election of 1987, through infiltration of New Zealand National Party branches. Besides its conservative stance on moral issues, the CCC was also strongly anti-Communist and pro-Western. It alleged that there was a conspiracy by Communist groups like the pro-Moscow Socialist Unity Party (SUP) to infiltrate the Labour Party, the trade unions, and exploit various popular issues like the anti-Springbok tour protests, Māori biculturalism, and the anti-nuclear movement.

In response to perceived Communist influence within these popular causes, Coalition activists and supporters supported maintaining ties with South Africa and preserving the ANZUS security alliance with the United States and Australia. It also opposed the introduction of Māori biculturalism and multiculturalism into the education system as 'anti-Christian' for allegedly promoting alternative religious beliefs.

According to Laurie Guy, the coalition was disproportionately dominated by members of the Reformed Churches of New Zealand and Pentecostals. It produced a newsletter called Coalition Courier. Some of its more moderate membership left and joined the Christian Heritage Party (later renamed Christian Heritage New Zealand, now defunct) after 1989, disgruntled at the group's perceived tendencies toward right-wing extremism. During its existence, the organisation also produced an anti-gay booklet entitled The Social Effects of Homosexuality (1985), which relied significantly on the work of controversial US psychologist Paul Cameron.

The group ceased to exist in the late 1990s.

== See also ==
- Christian politics in New Zealand
