= Owairaka Athletic Club =

Coordinates: 36.901493163°S 174.731788869°E

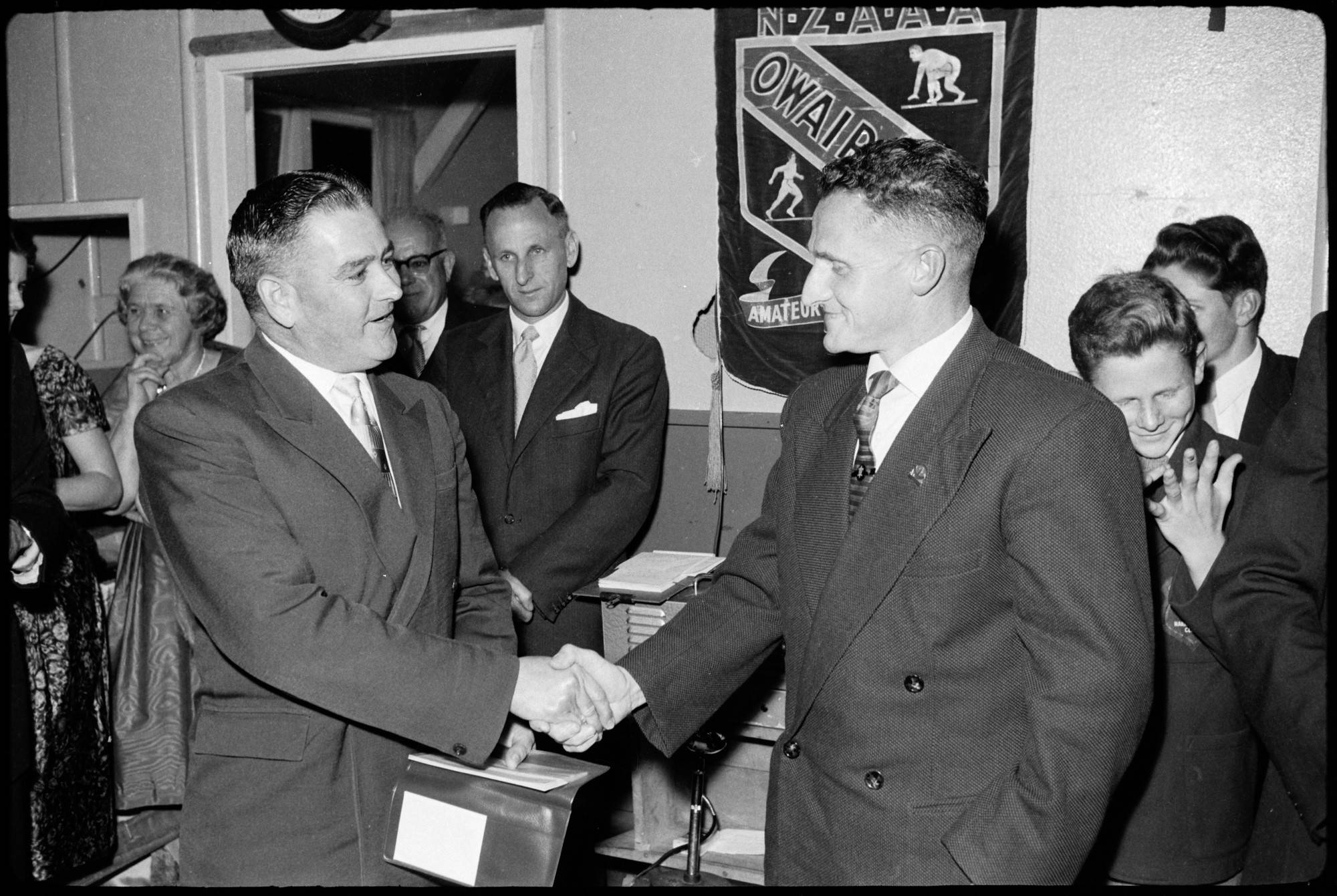
Frank Sharpley presenting Arthur Lydiard with a return ticket for the 1960 Summer Olympics at the 1960 Owairaka Amateur Athletic Club prizegiving

The Owairaka Athletic Club is an amateur athletics sports club based at the Lovelock Track in the suburb of Owairaka, Auckland. The club was founded at Anderson Park, Mt Albert in 1943 and moved to its present site in the 1960s with the construction of the Lovelock Track which was opened on April 15, 1961.

During the 1960s the club led the world in middle and long-distance running under the guidance of the legendary coach Arthur Lydiard (ONZ, OBE). The club has produced many international and national champions, most notably, Murray Halberg (ONZ, MBE) and the New Zealand Athlete of the Century, Peter Snell (KNZM, MBE). It is the training group of Murray Halberg, Peter Snell, Barry Magee, Bill Baillie, Jeff Julian, and Ray Puckett known as Arthur's Boys which captures the history of this era. They all trained together and were made Olympians by the end of the 1960s training off the famed Waitarua run through the challenging backblocks of Auckland.

The club is associated with two coaches who were inaugural inductees of the New Zealand Athletics Coach Hall of Fame: Arthur Lydiard (ONZ, OBE) and Arch Jelley, OBE, coach of 1976 Olympic 1500m gold medallist John Walker.

The late 1990s and into the 2000s saw the club's senior membership dwindle to social membership as organisational politics led to the senior membership amalgamating with College Rifles Harrier Club to form Auckland City Athletics Club with the goal of rivaling larger Auckland regional athletic clubs. Throughout the 2000s the junior membership of the club continued to be run by club stalwarts who persevered and preserved the club as a piece of international athletic history. Over the next ten years, the members entered non-competitive teams into relay events and maintained the children's athletics programme.

In 2009, the club worked with the Auckland City Council to build new facilities for the club and a new youth centre on the site of the old clubrooms at the Lovelock Track. During the 50th anniversary year of the 1961 Lovelock Track opening, Sir Murray Halberg opened the new clubrooms which coincided with the launch of a new five-year plan to rebuild the full membership of the club. Late in 2012 saw the closure of the existing Lovelock track and earthworks to begin on the resurfacing of old asphalt and black rubber surface to bring the track to competition standard once again. In September 2013, Owairaka celebrated its 70th Jubillee and will celebrate its 75th in 2018.
