= Victor Butler (rugby union) =

- Full name: Victor Claude Butler
- Born: 11 July 1907 Auckland, New Zealand
- Died: 1 February 1971 (aged 63) Auckland, New Zealand
- School: Mount Albert Grammar School

Rugby union career
- Position: Fullback
Provincial / State sides
Years	Team	Apps	(Points)
1926–31	Auckland	34	
International career
Years	Team	Apps	(Points)
1928	New Zealand		

Victor Claude Butler (11 July 1907 — 1 February 1971) was a New Zealand international rugby union player.

Butler was born in Auckland and educated at Mount Albert Grammar School.

A fullback, Butler represented the All Blacks in the first of three "international" matches against the touring 1928 New South Wales team, before making way for George Mehrtens. He competed regularly with Auckland and featured in their win over the 1930 British Lions. After serving as a major in World War II, Butler was assistant manager of the Kiwis for the 1945–46 Victory Internationals and also had a stint as Auckland selector.

Butler was the principal of Mount Roskill Grammar School in Auckland.

== See also ==
- List of New Zealand national rugby union players
