= Bill Subritzky =

Wilfred Allen Subritzky QSM (20 November 1925 – 23 December 2015) was a New Zealand lawyer and property developer, active from the mid-1950s until the mid-1980s. His company, Universal Homes, mass-produced houses in standard designs, and sold 14,000 houses over the 30-year period of Subritzky's involvement.

== Biography ==
Subritzky was born in 1925, and lived in Auckland. In 1971 he became involved in the charismatic movement, and became an independent evangelist and healer. Subritzky's faith healing ministry, Dove Ministries, distributes pamphlets, books and videos of his teaching and his evangelistic healing meetings. He was a charismatic Anglican but the style of his ministry was more similar to Pentecostals such as the late Derek Prince.

Subritzky was a proponent of the Toronto Blessing and its introduction into New Zealand. He frequently attributed problems, whether physical, spiritual, emotional or psychological, to the influence of demons, which he claimed to "cast out". He also claimed to have insight through the "word of knowledge" into people's sins, which have made them vulnerable to demonic influence. Skeptics questioned his claim that he had ability to cure ailments such as asthma, arthritis and cancer, stating that he used psychological manipulation to make people feel as though they were healed.

Subritzky was a friend to the controversial Nigerian "prophet" T.B. Joshua and publicly supported him amidst criticism that Joshua's "miracles" were not of God.

In 1986, Subritzky and other conservative Christians helped establish the Coalition of Concerned Citizens, a right-wing Christian pressure group formed to oppose the socially-liberal policies of the Fourth Labour Government. He was married to Lucy Patricia (Pat), who died in 2011. Subritzky later married Kaylene.

In the 1991 New Year Honours, Subritzky was awarded the Queen's Service Medal for community service.

Subritzky published his autobiography On the Cutting Edge: The Bill Subritzky Story in 1993.

In 2014, Subritzky's 8.9 ha (22 acres) estate in Lynfield, Mount Roskill was sold to Ryman Healthcare with an estimated market value of $16.2 million. The property was developed by Subritzky and his first wife, Pat, in 1960 and featured several homes, a pool, tennis court, sheds and a separate office wing from where Subritzky ran his businesses.

Subritzky died on 23 December 2015.

== Honorific eponyms ==
Subritzky Avenue in Mount Roskill was named after him.
