= Dorothy Blomfield =

New Zealand welfare worker and local politician

Dorothy Constance Blomfield MBE JP (2 November 1893 – 1 September 1987) was a New Zealand welfare worker and local politician. She was born in Wellington, New Zealand, on 2 November 1893.

She sought the National Party nomination for the 1959 Hamilton by-election, but was unsuccessful.

In the 1966 Queen's Birthday Honours, Blomfield was appointed a Member of the Order of the British Empire, for services to social welfare and local government.
