= Mount Roskill Intermediate =

Location
- Denbigh Avenue, Mount Roskill, Auckland, New Zealand; 36°54′36.92″S 174°44′42.86″E

Information
- Type: State co-ed intermediate, years 7–8
- Motto: Strive, Seek, Find
- Established: 1956
- Ministry of Education Institution no.: 1383
- Principal: Kristen Walsham
- Enrolment: 562 (July 2026)
- Socio-economic decile: 4
- Website: www.mri.school.nz

Mount Roskill Intermediate is a co-educational school for boys and girls in years 7 and 8. It is located in Denbigh Avenue, Mount Roskill, Auckland, New Zealand next to Mount Roskill Primary and Mount Roskill Grammar School. It currently has a roll of 620 pupils.

== History ==
The school first opened in 1956. It was completely remodelled during 1995.

== School motto ==
The school motto is "Strive, Seek, Find". It comes from the last line of a poem called Ulysses by Alfred, Lord Tennyson.

== School logo ==
Its logo is a shield containing three parts a torch, star, and a book, which is referring to the motto.

== Sports ==
Mt Roskill Intermediate takes part in various activities and mostly entering competitions to compete with neighbouring schools and schools around Auckland. The main sports events are Rugby, Cricket, Netball, Soccer [football], Badminton, Tennis, Basketball, Table Tennis, Hockey. The school has been successful in all of the activities, staff of the school take up the coaching and responsibilities.

== Specialisation and enhancement classes ==
Specialisation classes include Performing Arts, Hard Materials Technology, Food technology and Science. All students experience each of the specialist classes every year, building on the skill they develop. Additional Enhancement opportunities are available for students who show potential and talent in specialisation classes.

== Notable alumni ==
- Doug Howlett (born 21 September 1978), New Zealand All Blacks Winger.

Che Clark (born 22 April 2003), New Zealand All Blacks 7s
