= Puketāpapa =

Scoria cone in Auckland, New Zealand

Puketāpapa / Pukewīwī
- Mount Roskill
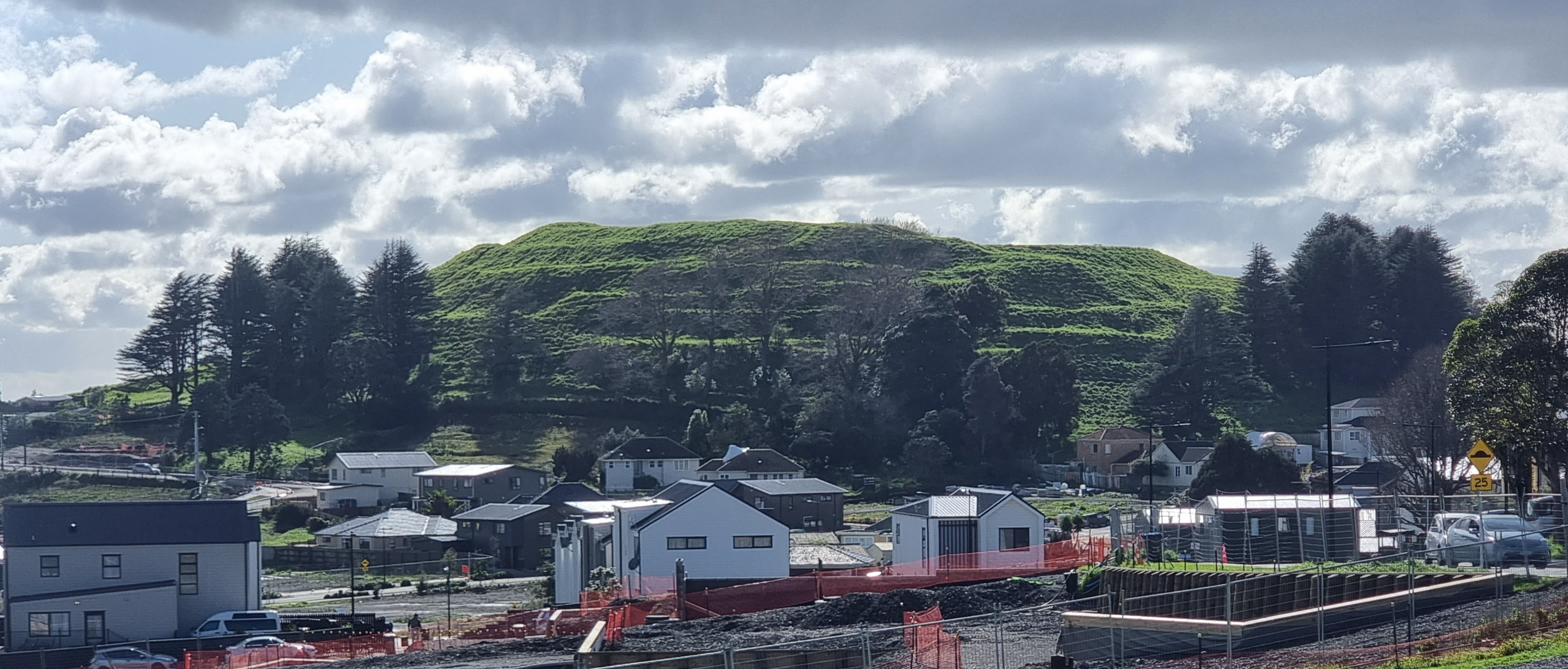
- The south side of Puketāpapa / Pukewīwī / Mount Roskill

Highest point
- Elevation: 440 m (1,440 ft)
- Coordinates: 36°55′S 174°44′E

Geography
- Location: North Island, New Zealand

Geology
- Rock age: Pleistocene
- Volcanic field: Auckland volcanic field

Puketāpapa, also known as Pukewīwī and Mount Roskill, is a volcanic peak and Tūpuna Maunga (ancestral mountain) in Auckland, New Zealand. It is located in the suburb that shares its English name, Mount Roskill.

== Description ==
The 110 metres (360 ft) mountain formed as a result of volcanic activity approximately 20,000 years ago. The scoria cone was built by fire-fountaining from two craters. Its peak, located in present-day Winstone Park (32 acres (13 ha) donated by George Winstone in 1925, when 1,600 sections were created around it) towards the southwest end of the suburb. It is one of the many extinct cones that dot the isthmus of Auckland, all part of the Auckland volcanic field. Lava flowed from the base of the cone to the north and to the northwest.

It was the site of a Māori pā (fortified village), and was known as Pukewīwī (hill covered in rushes) and Puketāpapa (flat-topped hill). Many historic cooking pits and terracing sites were destroyed when the main southern crater was excavated in 1961 and filled with a water-supply reservoir.

None of its three names are official. In 2014, the Tāmaki Collective agreed that both Puketāpapa and Pukewīwī reflect the historical association of local Māori with this site.

== Motorway and cycleway ==
Since 2009 State Highway 20 has passed close to the mountain. The effects of the new motorway on the mountain had been the subject of significant discussion, and a major mitigation package had been proposed to reduce the impact of the motorway (and the continuation of the Waikaraka Cycleway that runs parallel to it). The funding of this mitigation and the missing cycleway section was briefly in doubt in 2009, when a cost blowout to $2 million was criticised by local residents after Auckland Council had set aside $1.6 million. Cycling advocates from Cycle Action Auckland, the Mount Roskill Community Board Chairman Richard Barter and Councillor John Lister however noted various elements unrelated to the cycleway that had driven up the cost, such as a toilet block, bluestone walls, extensive landscaping and artwork, much of it related to Winstone Park itself, or the effects of the motorway. The cycle-path section itself was priced at only $300,000. The path section was finished after six months of construction work and it (and the park facilities) opened to the public on 25 July 2010.

== Treaty settlement ==
In the 2014 Treaty of Waitangi settlement between the Crown and the Tāmaki Collective, ownership of the 14 Tūpuna Maunga of Tāmaki Makaurau / Auckland, was vested to the collective. The legislation specified that the land be held in trust "for the common benefit of Ngā Mana Whenua o Tāmaki Makaurau and the other people of Auckland". The Tūpuna Maunga o Tāmaki Makaurau Authority or Tūpuna Maunga Authority (TMA) is the co-governance organisation established to administer the 14 Tūpuna Maunga. Auckland Council manages the mountain under the direction of the TMA.

Due to its cultural and archaeological significance, the upper part of the summit was grassed in 2018, and is permanently closed to private motor vehicles.
