= Mount Roskill =

- Suburb
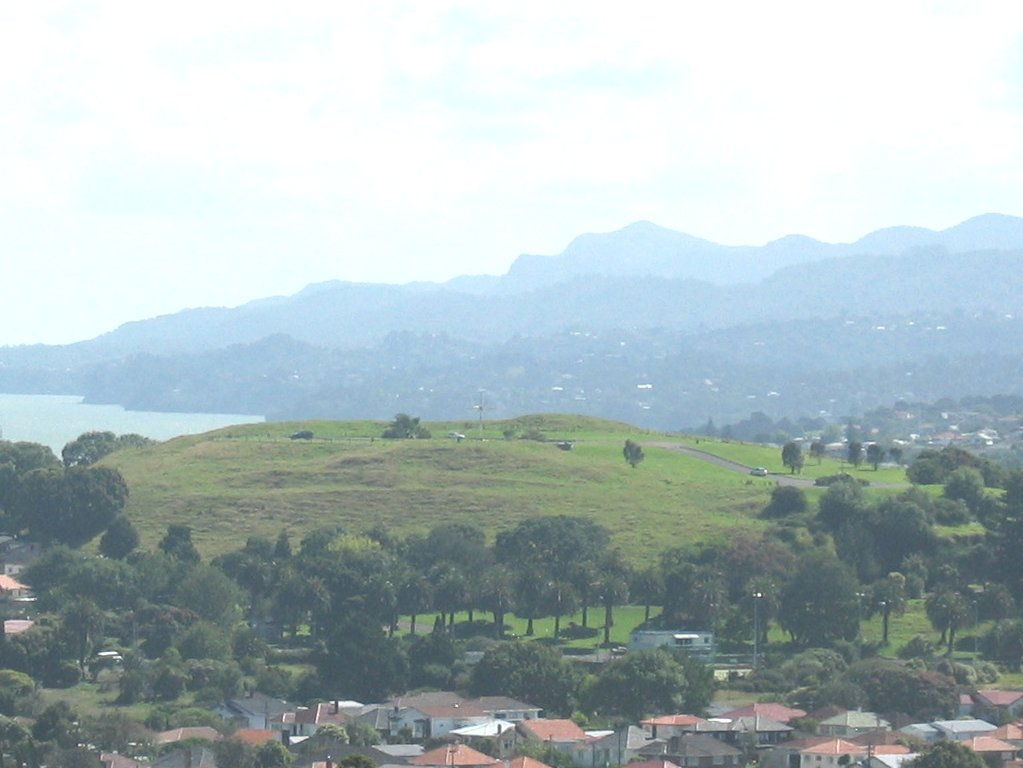
- Mount Roskill from Big King. The Waitākere Ranges in the background.
- Interactive map of Mount Roskill
- Coordinates: 36.912594°S 174.737259°E
- Country: New Zealand
- City: Auckland
- Local authority: Auckland Council
- Electoral ward: Albert-Eden-Puketāpapa ward
- Local board: Puketāpapa Local Board

Area
  - Land: 742 ha (1,830 acres)

Population (June 2025)
  - Total: 28,960
  - Density: 3,900/km^{2} (10,100/sq mi)

Owairaka, Sandringham	Balmoral, Eden Valley	Mount Eden
New Windsor, New Zealand, Wesley	Mount Roskill	Three Kings
Lynfield	Waikōwhai	Hillsborough

Mount Roskill (Māori: Puketāpapa) is a suburban area in the city of Auckland, New Zealand. It is named for the volcanic peak Mount Roskill.

== Etymology ==
The name Mount Roskill was first recorded as Mt Rascal in 1841, on a map created by a Wesleyan missionary, referring to the volcanic peak Puketāpapa. The origin of this name is unclear, however an apocryphal story links the name to a livestock thief from the early colonial era, who allegedly used the peak as a grazing area for stolen sheep and cattle. The peak was variously called Mount Roskill or Mount Kennedy (after landowner Alexander Kennedy). The name Mount Roskill for the peak and the surrounding area likely cemented after 1867, when the local government administering Dominion Road was formed, which took the name Mt Roskill Highway Board. The first uses of Mount Roskill to describe the suburb in newspapers come from the late 1860s.

== Geography and geological history ==
The volcanic peak Puketāpapa erupted an estimated 20,000 years ago. The earlier eruption of Ōwairaka / Mount Albert and Puketāpapa blocked the original flow of the Oakley Creek, causing much of the area between the two peaks to become a peaty swamp.

Mount Roskill is located in the south of the Auckland isthmus, approximately seven kilometres to the south of the Auckland city centre. It is surrounded by the neighbouring suburbs of Three Kings, Sandringham, Wesley, Hillsborough and Mount Albert. The Mount Roskill shops are located at the intersection of Mount Albert and Dominion Roads.

== History ==
=== Early history and colonial era ===
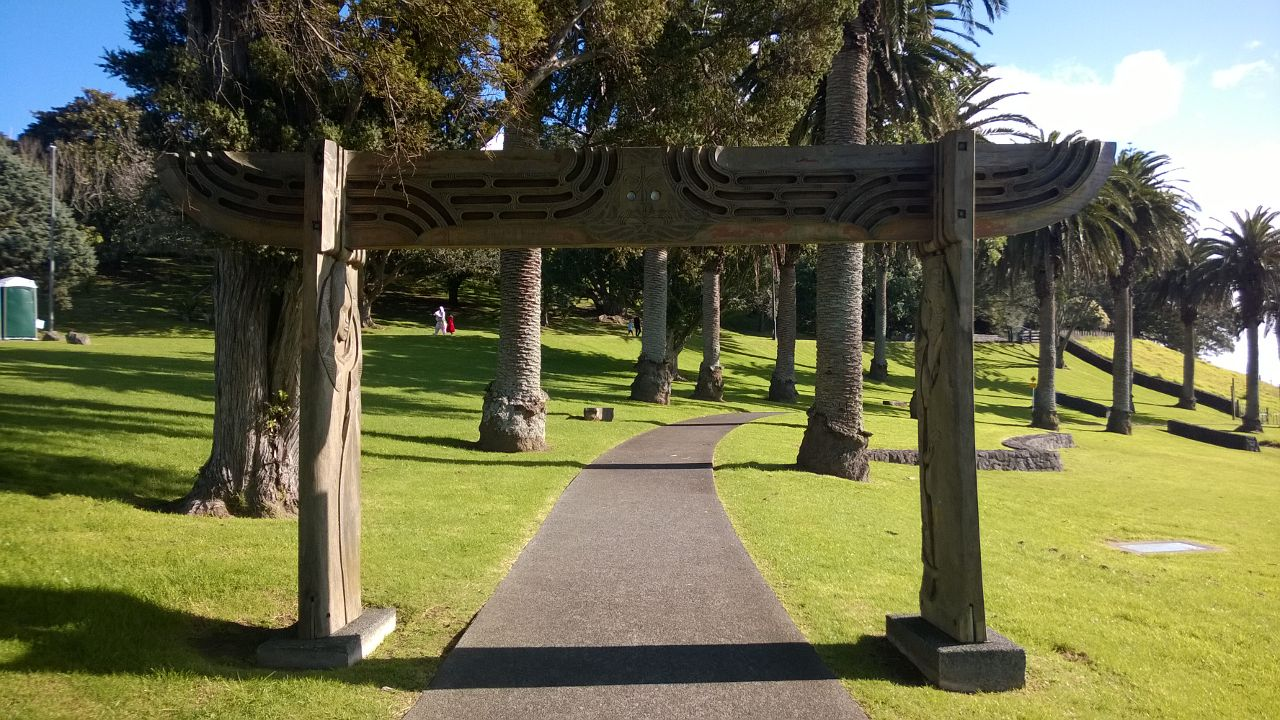
A Māori carved gate at Winstone Park on the road to Puketāpapa/Mount Roskill

The area has been settled by Tāmaki Māori iwi hapū since at least the 13th century. The Oakley Creek, traditionally known as Te Auaunga, was a source of crayfish, eels and weka for Tāmaki Māori. Harakeke (New Zealand flax) and raupō, which grew along the banks of the creek, were harvested here to create Māori traditional textiles. By the early 18th century, the area was within the rohe of Waiohua. In this period, Puketāpapa was the site of a fortified pā. After the defeat of Kiwi Tāmaki, the paramount chief of the iwi, the area became part of the rohe of Ngāti Whātua (modern-day Ngāti Whātua Ōrākei). During the early 19th century, the focus of life for Ngāti Whātua was at Onehunga and Māngere, and the Mount Roskill area was used seasonally.

Mount Roskill formed a part of a land sale between Ngāti Whātua and the Crown on 29 June 1841. In 1845, Alexander Kennedy of the Union Bank of Australia, purchased much of the area from the Crown, on-selling this to Joseph May in 1849. The Crown sold further parcels of land to settlers in 1848 and 1849, and the area developed into farmland by the late 19th century. A number of large country estates owned by wealthier families were found in the Mount Roskill farmland, such as Joseph May's estate, which was redeveloped into the Akarana Golf Clubhouse. The area was known to early settlers as a good location for raising ducks and geese, and as a source of water for cattle. While the area close to Three Kings in the north had fertile farmland, the southern area of Mount Roskill along the Hillsborough ridge was not as profitable.

In the early 1910s, Mount Roskill became known for its strawberry farms, primarily those operated by William Johnston and Teddy Edwards. After World War I and the return of servicemen, a number of unprofitable strawberry farms were set up in the area, crashing the strawberry market only a decade later. During the 1920s, Chinese New Zealanders Quong Sing and Wong Key developed market gardens at Mount Roskill.

=== Suburban development ===
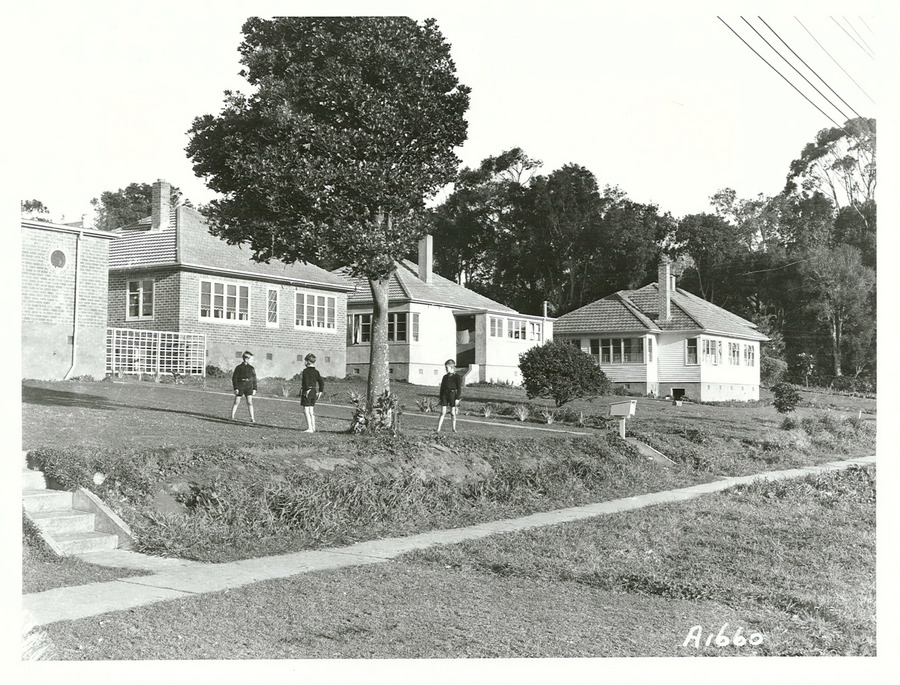
State housing in Mount Roskill, circa the 1940s

Beginning in the 1920s, private housing estates began developing at Mount Roskill. One of the first developments was the Victory Estate, which was constructed around Dominion Road the 1920s. This was followed by the Winstone Estate, which developed at the foot of Puketāpapa from 1932.

In 1930, the Auckland tramway network was extended south along Dominion Road, reaching Mount Albert Road and creating a new terminus, around which a shopping centre developed (now known as the Mount Roskill Town Centre). Starting in 1939, a large state housing development occurred in Mount Roskill, due to the land at the end of tramways was comparatively cheap to develop. By 1947, 1,085 new houses had been built in the area, a figure which had grown to 2,529 by 1953. The state housing developments in the area created a quick growth in population, going from 6,979 residents in 1936 to 25,549 in 1956. Around 600 houses were part of the government's development at the Lower Wesley Estate, an area west of Three Kings purchased from the Wesley Trust.

Mount Roskill became a borough in 1947, which meant that Mount Roskill now had a mayor, a local council and were able to invest more into the area. One of the earliest issues faced by the new borough was improving stormwater works for housing around the Oakley Creek, after substantial floods in Wesley in 1948 and 1953. During the 1950s, the suburb became known as the "Bible Belt" of Auckland, due to the area's conservative Presbyterian mayor Keith Hay, and because the area had the highest per capita number of churches in New Zealand.

Over time the image of Mount Roskill as a conservative Christian area waned, after a large influx of migrants and refugees into the area. The 2006 film No. 2, shot in Mount Roskill, was inspired by director Toa Fraser's experiences of growing up in Mount Roskill as a multicultural place.

The area was one of the last in the country to go "wet", in 1999, having formally been a dry area where the selling of alcohol was prohibited.

In the early 2000s, work began on extending the Southwestern Motorway north of Hillsborough. This led to 120 properties in Mount Roskill being purchased, in order to make way for the new motorway.

== Demographics ==
Mount Roskill covers 7.42 km^{2} (2.86 sq mi) and had an estimated population of 28,960 as of June 2025, with a population density of 3,903 people per km^{2}.

Historical population
Year	Pop.	±% p.a.
2006	23,568	—
2013	24,711	+0.68%
2018	26,568	+1.46%
2023	25,743	−0.63%

Mount Roskill had a population of 25,743 in the 2023 New Zealand census, a decrease of 825 people (−3.1%) since the 2018 census, and an increase of 1,032 people (4.2%) since the 2013 census. There were 12,936 males, 12,702 females and 105 people of other genders in 8,004 dwellings. 3.6% of people identified as LGBTIQ+. The median age was 34.6 years (compared with 38.1 years nationally). There were 4,446 people (17.3%) aged under 15 years, 6,108 (23.7%) aged 15 to 29, 11,958 (46.5%) aged 30 to 64, and 3,228 (12.5%) aged 65 or older.

People could identify as more than one ethnicity. The results were 26.9% European (Pākehā); 7.0% Māori; 17.8% Pasifika; 52.8% Asian; 5.0% Middle Eastern, Latin American and African New Zealanders (MELAA); and 1.4% other, which includes people giving their ethnicity as "New Zealander". English was spoken by 88.0%, Māori language by 1.4%, Samoan by 4.8%, and other languages by 44.7%. No language could be spoken by 2.5% (e.g. too young to talk). New Zealand Sign Language was known by 0.4%. The percentage of people born overseas was 54.8, compared with 28.8% nationally.

Religious affiliations were 32.3% Christian, 14.6% Hindu, 9.3% Islam, 0.3% Māori religious beliefs, 2.5% Buddhist, 0.3% New Age, 0.1% Jewish, and 1.9% other religions. People who answered that they had no religion were 33.2%, and 5.6% of people did not answer the census question.

Of those at least 15 years old, 7,359 (34.6%) people had a bachelor's or higher degree, 7,692 (36.1%) had a post-high school certificate or diploma, and 6,243 (29.3%) people exclusively held high school qualifications. The median income was $39,000, compared with $41,500 nationally. 2,100 people (9.9%) earned over $100,000 compared to 12.1% nationally. The employment status of those at least 15 was that 10,920 (51.3%) people were employed full-time, 2,577 (12.1%) were part-time, and 726 (3.4%) were unemployed.

Individual statistical areas
Name	Area (km^{2})	Population	Density (per km^{2})	Dwellings	Median age	Median income
Mount Roskill North	0.96	3,729	3,884	1,296	36.3 years	$46,100
Mount Roskill White Swan	0.56	2,349	4,195	741	35.5 years	$41,900
Mount Roskill Nirvana	0.48	2,163	4,506	639	34.1 years	$40,900
Mount Roskill Central North	0.90	3,090	3,433	900	35.5 years	$32,000
Mount Roskill North East	0.65	2,160	3,323	687	32.9 years	$32,700
Mount Roskill Central South	1.20	2,454	2,045	681	30.4 years	$28,400
Mount Roskill South	1.13	3,063	2,711	1,023	41.0 years	$41,300
Mount Roskill Central East	0.84	3,501	4,168	1,119	33.8 years	$50,300
Mount Roskill South East	0.70	3,234	4,620	915	32.8 years	$33,700
New Zealand					38.1 years	$41,500

== Local government ==
The first local government in the area was the Mt Roskill Highway Board, that formed on 7 August 1868 to administer and fund the roads in the area. In 1883, the Highway Board became the Mt Roskill Road Board. In 1927, Mt Roskill attempted to become a borough separate from Eden County, however this was unsuccessful. After growth in the area, Mt Roskill achieved borough status in 1947, meaning the area now had a borough council and mayor, and was able to invest more into infrastructure projects.

Keith Hay was the longest serving mayor of Mount Roskill, holding the role from 1953 until 1974, when Dick Fickling was elected. Fickling resigned mid-term in 1987, and was replaced by Hay's son David Hay in 1987. In 1970, Mt Roskill and Onehunga boroughs proposed merging into a single entity, however this merger never eventuated.

In 1989, the borough was amalgamated into Auckland City. On 1 November 2010, the Auckland Council was formed as a unitary authority governing the entire Auckland Region, and Mount Roskill become a part of the Puketāpapa local board area, administered by the Puketāpapa Local Board.

The Puketāpapa local board area forms a part of the Albert-Eden-Puketāpapa ward, which votes for two members of the Auckland Council. The Albert-Eden-Puketāpapa ward is represented by counsellors Christine Fletcher and Julie Fairey.

=== Mayors (1947–1989) ===
During its existence from 1947 to 1989, the borough of Mount Roskill had five mayors:

	Name	Term
1	Charles McCullough	1947–1950
2	Philip Ernest Potter	1950–1953
3	Keith Hay	1953–1974
4	Dick Fickling	1974–1987
5	David Hay	1987–1989

== Amenities and landmarks ==
- The Fickling Convention Centre is a community centre for Mount Roskill. Built in 1976, housing the community library, Citizens Advice Bureau, Fickling Hall. Named after Dick Fickling, the major. Originally envisioned as a small theme park.
- Mt Roskill Library was built and opened to public in August 1977. It was refurbished and the floor area extended in November 2011. Mt Roskill Library has English, Māori, Chinese, Tamil, Arabic and Somali collections.
- Mount Roskill Rugby Football Club, Bay Roskill Vikings, and Eden Roskill District Cricket Club are based in the suburb.

== Education ==
Mount Roskill Grammar School is a secondary school (years 9–13) with a roll of 1,919. Mount Roskill Intermediate is an intermediate school (years 7–8) with a roll of 562. Mount Roskill Primary is a contributing primary school (years 1–6) with a roll of 631. These schools are on adjoining sites. Mount Roskill Grammar School opened first in 1953, followed by Mount Roskill Primary in 1955 and Mount Roskill Intermediate in 1956.

Dominion Road School, Hay Park School and May Road School are contributing primary schools (years 1–6) with rolls of 208, 153 and 178, respectively. May Road School opened in 1925, followed by Dominion Road School in 1929, which operated a satellite site of Three Kings School until 1937. Hay Park School opened in 1963.

Monte Cecilia School is a state-integrated Catholic contributing primary school (years 1–6) with a roll of 143. The school opened in 1925, by the Sisters of St Joseph of the Sacred Heart and the Sisters of Mercy, and was originally a private school.

All these schools are coeducational. Rolls are as of July 2026.

== People ==
Mount Roskill has been home to many successful New Zealanders who attended the local schools. Among them are:

- Rugby coach John Hart,
- Billionaire Graeme Hart,
- Evangelist Bill Subritzky
- Rugby union international Doug Howlett,
- Actor and South Sydney Rabbitohs owner Russell Crowe,
- Reserve Bank Governor Alan Bollard,
- Tennis player Brett Steven,
- Labour MP Phil Goff,
- Balmain Tigers, Eastern Suburbs Roosters, Penrith Panthers and Parramatta Eels and New Zealand rugby league international, 1992 Dally M Medallist, former Kiwi coach and commentator Gary Freeman
- Former rugby league international Dane O'Hara
- Former rugby league international and New Zealand Māori representative Bill Burgoyne
- Former New Zealand Warriors, Melbourne Storm, St George-Illawarra Dragons, Parramatta Eels and Cronulla-Sutherland Sharks rugby league international, New Zealand Māori representative and current NRL referee Henry Perenara
- Former Parramatta Eels rugby league player Marcus Perenara
- Manly-Warringah Sea Eagles and New Zealand rugby league international Steve Matai
- New Zealand Warriors captain, rugby league international and professional boxer Monty Betham
- Canterbury-Bankstown Bulldogs and Wests Tigers rugby league international Matt Utai
- New Zealand Warriors and Kiwi rugby league international Evarn Tuimavave
- Parramatta Eels rugby league player Manu Ma'u
- New Zealand Warriors rugby league player Ben Henry
- Canberra Raiders rugby league player Bill Tupou
- Cronulla-Sutherland Sharks rugby league player Sosaia Feki
- Canberra Raiders rugby league player Simi Sasagi
- New Zealand Warriors rugby league player Sione Lousi
- New Zealand Warriors rugby league player Sam Lousi
- Newcastle Knights rugby league player Paterika Vaivai
- The Hay family (of Keith Hay Homes)
- Professional cricket player Azhar Abbas
- New York Times Best Selling author Nalini Singh

In 2007, the Mount Roskill Community Board commissioned a 176-page book titled Just Passing Through: A History of Mt Roskill (Jade Reidy) which covered the growth of the district from 1840 up until the present time. It identified the significant input of Mount Roskill residents internationally, such as athletics coach Arthur Lydiard in the chapter "How Sport Put Mt Roskill on the World Map."

== Bibliography ==
- Nicola Legat:"In God We Trust? The Mount Roskillisation of Auckland" Metro 152 (February 1994): 58–67.
- David Craig: "Thin Topsoil: Queer Blokes, Moral Modernity and Real Estate Politics in New Zealand's Biggest Borough" in Ian Carter, David Craig and Steve Matthewman: Almighty Auckland? Palmerston North: Dunmore Press: 2004: ISBN 0-86469-452-0
- Reidy, Jade (2013). Not Just Passing Through: the Making of Mt Roskill (2nd ed.). Auckland: Puketāpapa Local Board. ISBN 978-1-927216-97-2. OCLC 889931177. Wikidata Q116775081.
- City of Volcanoes: A geology of Auckland – Searle, Ernest J.; revised by Mayhill, R.D.; Longman Paul, 1981. First published 1964. ISBN 0-582-71784-1.
- Volcanoes of Auckland: The Essential Guide. Hayward, B.W., Murdoch, G., Maitland, G.; Auckland University Press, 2011.
