= State Highway 20 (New Zealand) =

Road in New Zealand

State Highway 20
- Southwestern Motorway
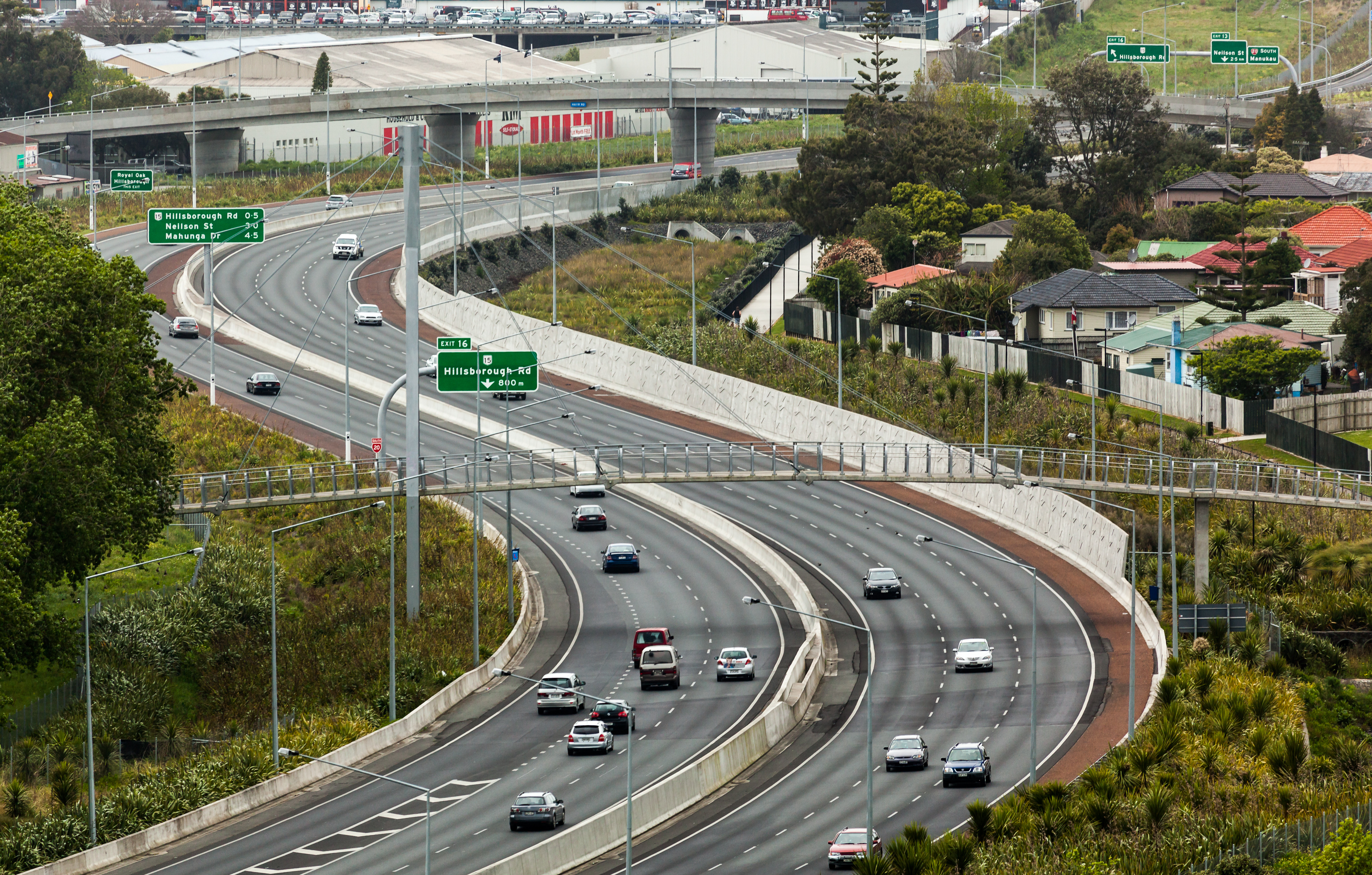
- The Southwestern Motorway seen from Puketāpapa / Mount Roskill in 2011

Route information
- Maintained by NZ Transport Agency Waka Kotahi
- Length: 25 km (16 mi)
- Existed: 1977–present

Major junctions
- South end: SH 1 (Auckland Southern Motorway) at Manukau City Centre
- SH 20B (Puhinui Road) at Puhinui; SH 20A (George Bolt Memorial Drive) at Māngere
- North end: SH 16 (Northwestern Motorway) at Waterview

Location
- Country: New Zealand

Highway system
- New Zealand state highways; Motorways and expressways; List
← SH 19	→ SH 21

George Bolt Memorial Drive
- Location: SH 20 at Māngere – SH 20A Airport
- Length: 4.1 km (2.5 mi)

Puhinui Road
- Location: SH 20 at Puhinui – SH 20B at Airport
- Length: 2.3 km (1.4 mi)

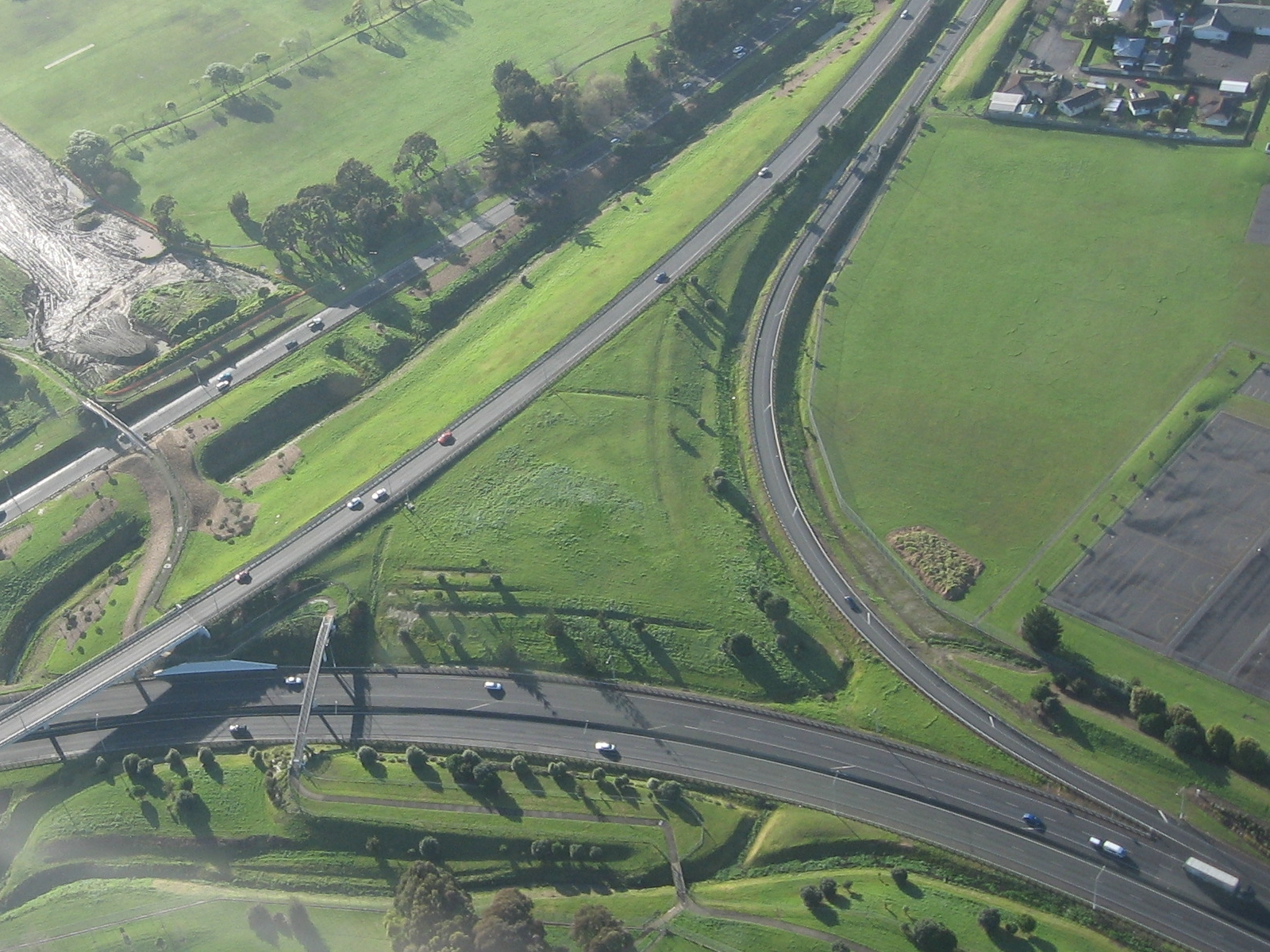
Aerial view of the interchange between SH 20 (diagonal from bottom left to upper right) and SH 20A towards the airport (towards bottom right).

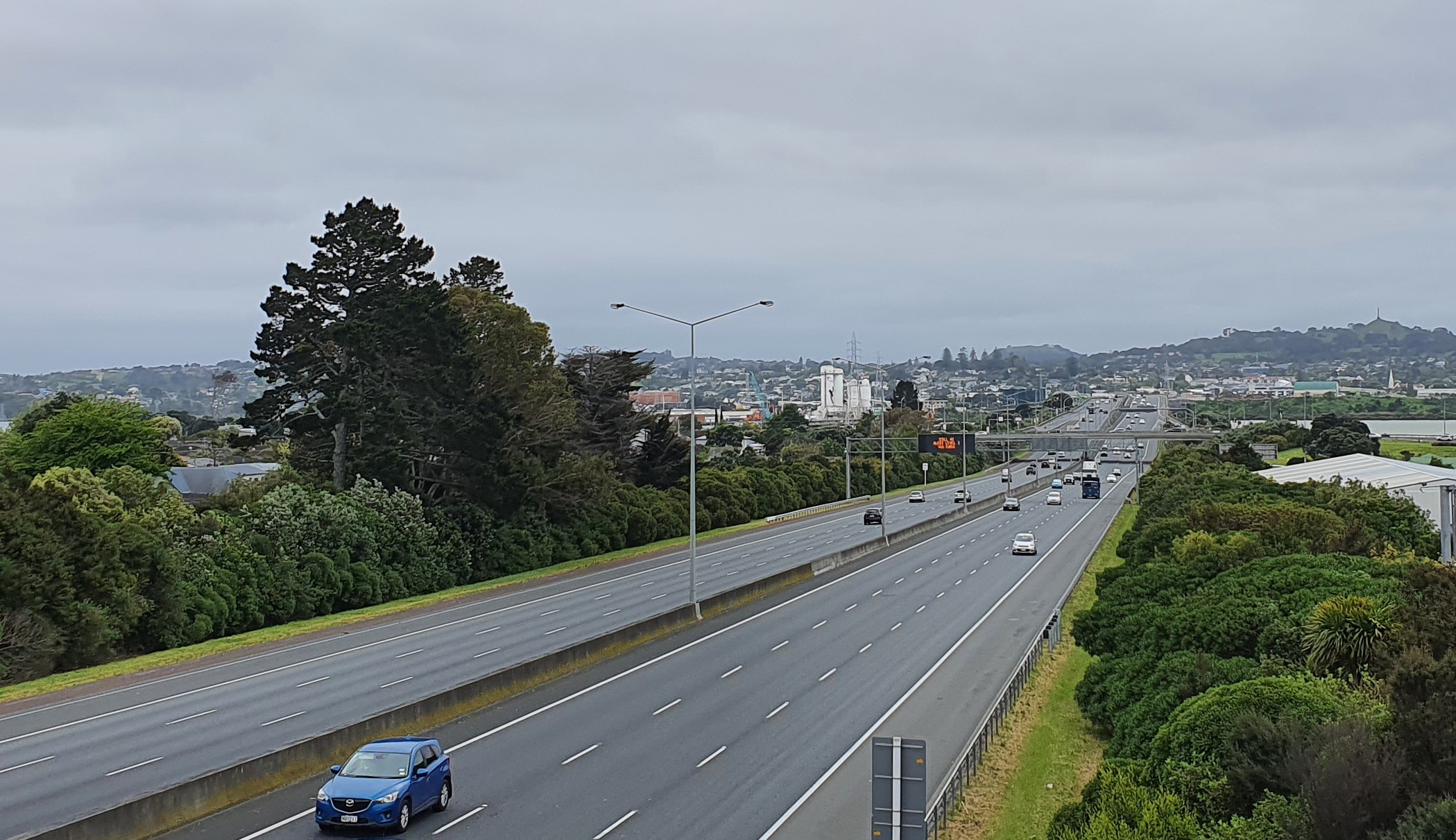
State Highway 20 as seen from Māngere Bridge, looking north

State Highway 20 (SH 20), also known as the Southwestern Motorway, is a New Zealand state highway linking State Highway 1 at Manukau with State Highway 16 in Point Chevalier, via Māngere and Onehunga. Along with its spurs, State Highway 20A and 20B, the state highway serves Auckland Airport, the country's largest, therefore making SH 20 a key arterial route connecting the airport to the wider Auckland region and most of the upper North Island. The route also forms the southern part of the Western Ring Route, a 48 kilometres (30 mi) motorway route bypassing central Auckland.

== Route ==
SH 20 begins from the Auckland Southern Motorway (SH 1) at Manukau, then heads northwest to Māngere. It then runs over the Māngere Bridge to Onehunga, whereupon it continues northwest, cutting through Mount Roskill and Owairaka. It then enters the Waterview Tunnel, New Zealand's longest road tunnel, before ending at a junction with the Northwestern Motorway (SH 16)

=== Airport connection ===
SH 20, SH 20A, and SH 20B form an almost triangular shape between the Puhinui Interchange of the Southwestern Motorway, Auckland International Airport, and the SH 20/SH 20A motorway junction. The Southwestern Motorway bypasses Auckland International Airport, with spurs SH 20A from the north and SH 20B from the east both providing airport access.

SH 20A leaves the Southwestern Motorway in Māngere and travels south along an additional stretch of motorway, commonly referred to as the "Airport Motorway". The motorway passes underneath Kirkbride Road at a grade separated intersection which until 2017 was the former terminus for the motorway (and a known black spot). The motorway continues south and terminates at the intersection with Verissimo and Landing Drives where SH 20A also terminates. From there the road continues south, along George Bolt Memorial Drive, to the airport.

SH 20B leaves SH 20 at the Cavendish Dr/Puhinui Rd/Roscommon Rd Interchange of the Southwestern Motorway and travels west along Puhinui Road to the airport, officially terminating at the intersection with Orrs Road.

== History ==
A motorway linking the Northwestern and Southern sections of Auckland was recognised early in the planning stages for the Auckland motorway system, and land along the Southwestern Corridor was protected against development in the 1950s. The Southwestern Motorway was a prominent aspect of a 1963 master transport plan for Auckland created by the US consultancy firm De Leuw Cather and Co, which identified a need for a motorway linking the Northwestern Motorway, Dominion Road, Māngere and Wiri, also identifying the need for a rapid transport rail route along the same corridor. In 1968, the Auckland Regional Authority began planning agreements for the route between the Northwestern Motorway and Dominion Rd, while the National Roads Board (now a part of the NZ Transport Agency) began organising the route southeast, between Dominion Road and Wiri.

The first section of what would become the Southwestern Motorway was the Onehunga Bypass from Queenstown Road in Hillsborough to Neilson Street in Onehunga in 1977, which terminated at the Old Mangere Bridge, a low-lying concrete structure built in 1915. The contract for a new motorway bridge over the Māngere Inlet between Onehunga and Māngere Bridge was let in July 1974, with work expected to take three years to complete. In May 1978 the construction halted when workers organised a labour strike over insufficient redundancy payments. The partially constructed bridge was picketed for a period of two and a half years, becoming the longest continuous labour strike in the history of New Zealand. Eventually, the bridge was opened in February 1983, and by 1984 the motorway extended south to Coronation Road.

The construction of the motorway had a strong impact on the Te Puea Memorial Marae community in the Māngere Bridge suburb, as the motorway cut off pedestrian access to the surrounding areas. Land reclamation as a part of the bridge construction meant the marae was no longer adjacent to the Māngere Inlet, and the land surrounding the marae was redesignated as a light industrial area.

The Auckland Comprehensive Transportation Study Review (1986) confirmed the Southwestern Motorway between Dominion Road and Māngere was a top priority of the Auckland Regional Authority. By 1987, the Papatoetoe Bypass was completed, linking Massey Road to the south, ending at a roundabout meeting Puhinui Road. The gap between Coronation Road and Massey Road, known as the Māngere Extension, was not completed until 1997. The Manukau Extension, connecting Puhinui Road to the Southern Motorway (bypassing Wiri Station Road) was completed in 2010. A duplication of the Māngere Bridge, with future provision for rail, was also opened in 2010.

The northern section was first extended to Hillsborough Road in 1989. Work began on the Mt Roskill Extension in August 2005, with construction of the section ending at Maioro Street/Sandringham Road finishing on 15 May 2009. The final section of the Southwestern Motorway, the Waterview Connection, connecting Maioro Street with SH 16 at the Great North Road Interchange commenced construction in 2012 and opened to traffic in July 2017.

=== SH20A and SH20B ===
Additional links to the Auckland Airport were identified as necessary after the growth in air travel. SH20A, travelling from the Southwestern Motorway along George Bolt Memorial Drive, was completed in 1992. The creation of SH20B, linking the airport to the east, began through a series of widening and extension projects on Puhinui Road, including the creation of the Pukaki Bridge in 1996. In August 2003 the Puhinui Road Interchange opened, replacing the Puhinui Road/Southwestern Motorway roundabout.

== Exit list ==
=== SH 20 ===
Territorial authority	Location	km	mi	Exit	Destinations	Notes
Auckland — Ōtara-Papatoetoe/Manurewa	Manukau	0.0	0.0	1	SH 1 (Southern Motorway) — Auckland, Hamilton	SH 20 and Southwest Motorway begins
Auckland — Ōtara-Papatoetoe/Manurewa	Manukau	1.1	0.68	2	Lambie Drive — Manukau, Wiri	
Auckland — Ōtara-Papatoetoe/Manurewa	Puhinui	3.1	1.9	3	SH 20B (Puhinui Road) / Route 30 (Cavendish Drive) – Airport	
Auckland — Māngere-Ōtāhuhu	Māngere	7.4	4.6	7	Route 14 (Massey Road)	Access to Middlemore Hospital
Auckland — Māngere-Ōtāhuhu	Māngere	8.9	5.5	9	SH 20A – Airport	No southbound entrance
Auckland — Māngere-Ōtāhuhu	Māngere	10.7	6.6	10	Walmsley Road Coronation Road	Southbound exit and entrance Northbound exit and entrance
Auckland — Māngere-Ōtāhuhu	Māngere Bridge	12.2	7.6	12	Mahunga Drive – Māngere Bridge	Southbound exit and northbound entrance
Auckland — Māngere-Ōtāhuhu	Manukau Harbour			Māngere Bridge		
Auckland — Maungakiekie-Tāmaki	Onehunga	13.5	8.4	13	Neilson Street	
Auckland — Puketāpapa	Hillsborough	14.8	9.2	15	Route 12 (Queenstown Road)	Northbound exit and southbound entrance
Auckland — Puketāpapa	Hillsborough	15.8	9.8	16	Route 15 (Hillsborough Road)	
Auckland — Puketāpapa	Mount Roskill	17.7	11.0	18	Route 4 (Dominion Road)	
Auckland — Puketāpapa	Mount Roskill	19.4	12.1	19	Maioro Street	Waterview Connection begins
Auckland — Albert-Eden	Waterview	23.8	14.8	24^{1}	SH 16 (Northwestern Motorway) – Wellsford, City Centre	Waterview Connection ends SH 20 and Southwestern Motorway ends
1.000 mi = 1.609 km; 1.000 km = 0.621 mi

^{1}Signed as exits 24A (north) and 24B (east)

=== SH 20A ===
Territorial authority	Location	km	mi	Exit	Destinations	Notes
Auckland — Māngere-Ōtāhuhu	Māngere	0.0	0.0		SH 20 north – City Centre	SH 20A begins
Auckland — Māngere-Ōtāhuhu	Māngere	1.3	0.81	1	Bader Drive	Northbound exit only
Auckland — Māngere-Ōtāhuhu	Māngere	2.1	1.3	2	Route 14 (Kirkbride Road)	
Auckland — Māngere-Ōtāhuhu	Māngere	4.1	2.5		Landing Drive / Verissimo Drive	SH 20A ends Continues south as George Bolt Memorial Drive to Auckland Airport
1.000 mi = 1.609 km; 1.000 km = 0.621 mi

== See also ==
- List of New Zealand state highways
- List of motorways and expressways in New Zealand
