= Mount Roskill Grammar School =

School in Auckland, New Zealand

Location
- Frost Road, Mt Roskill, Auckland, New Zealand; 36.911959°S 174.747945°E

Information
- Type: State co-educational secondary (Year 9–13)
- Motto: Sursum; To the Heights
- Established: 1953
- Ministry of Education Institution no.: 74
- Principal: Tom Webb
- Enrolment: 1,919 (July 2026)
- Socio-economic decile: 4
- Website: www.mrgs.school.nz

Mount Roskill Grammar School is a secondary school in the suburb of Mount Roskill, Auckland; it officially opened in 1953, The school has been noted for its relative academic success given its low socio-economic decile.

== History ==
The school opened in 1953, on a plot of land the Auckland Education Board purchased from the Auckland Rugby Union. It was one of the first new secondary schools in central Auckland in eight years, and was opened when Mount Roskill was a semi-rural but rapidly developing suburb. The school began with a roll of 363, but by 1964 the school had expanded to over 1,300 students, making it the largest in the country. When the school was first established, the grounds were rocky and uneven. In 1956, school students helped dig the school pool by hand.

In 1957 the school was granted its own board of governors and adopted the emblem of the Phoenix with the motto 'Sursum' meaning 'To the Heights'. The Phoenix was chosen for its symbolism of the pursuit of excellence and periodic renewal and revitalization.

The Maclean Centre for disabled students was opened in 1977, named in honour of Mr B H Maclean, Principal from 1966 to 1981. The Centre moved into a new building in 2003 and the staff and students are fully involved in all areas of school life.

In 1989, Colin Prentice, former head boy of Mount Roskil Grammar, became the school's principal.

In 2018, Mount Roskill adopted a gender-neutral uniform for its students.

== Enrolment ==
The school is one of the most diverse in New Zealand. The school roll has an ethnic composition of 26% Indian, 16% Chinese, 13% Pākehā, 11% Tongan, 8% Samoan, 6% Māori, 3% South East Asian, 3% African, 2% Cook Island Māori, and 12% other.

== Premises ==
The school has had several structural improvements, such as the construction of new buildings such as the Science Block, the Maclean Centre, T-Block, renovation of H-Block (including the Year 13 Common Room - a room with lockers, kitchen appliances, and recreation features dedicated to final year students), and the new gymnasium and classrooms. At the end of 2009, a new Pastoral Care Centre was built and opened in 2010. Rebuilding of the school's C-Block finished late 2010. In 2016, a new Olympic-grade hockey turf was completed.

== Academics ==
Mount Roskill Grammar School was described by the New Zealand Herald in 2007 as the "best public school in New Zealand". In 2009 Metro Magazine has also ranked MRGS as the top school in Auckland.

The school has 10 computer labs catering for students from Year 9-13. The school is also one of the schools participating in the Phase 2 of the Beacon Practice from GIF Technology Education initiative.

In 2013, 90.7 percent of students leaving Mount Roskill Grammar held at least NCEA Level 1, 82.5 percent held at least NCEA Level 2, and 58.3 percent held at least University Entrance. This is compared to 85.2%, 74.2%, and 49.0% respectively for all students nationally.

== Principals ==
	Name	Term
1	Victor Claude Butler	1953–1965
2	Bruce Home MacLean	1966–1981
3	Charles John James Dowdle	1982–1989
4	Colin John Prentice	1989–1994
5	Ken B. Rapson	1994–2006
6	Greg Watson	2006–2023
7	Tom Webb	2024–present

== Extracurricular activities ==
Mount Roskill Grammar School offers sports, music and other extracurricular activities. There are culture groups relating to Indian, Chinese, Japanese, Kapa haka, Tongan, Samoan, Tokelauan, Niuean and Cook Islands culture. The Indian Dance group won the 2007 Annual Bollywood Highschool Dance Competition.

The Boys Chorus (Mr G's Boys Chorus) was actively involved in Barbershop Music, winning a record of 5 consecutive Auckland Regional titles in 2002, 2003, 2004, 2005, and 2006 as well as the New Zealand National Young Singers in Harmony Championships in 2002, 2005 and 2006.

=== Houses ===
As of 2017, Mount Roskill Grammar School has 5 houses that have been named after famous New Zealanders - Rutherford (Red), Ngata (Orange), Sheppard (Yellow), Hillary (Green) And Cooper (Blue). Junior students are placed into house groups through their core classes, senior students remain in the houses they were in during year 10.

== Awards ==
- Goodman Fielder School of the Year Award, for Outstanding Performance in Education in 1998.
- Goodman Fielder Secondary School of the Year Award, in 2002, and finalist in the Secondary School section in 1999 and 2001.
- In 2017 the school was twice the winner of the High School League Premier Division Championships.

== Notable alumni ==
- Gretchen Albrecht, artist
- Alannah Currie, Thompson Twins member
- Abby Erceg, former New Zealand Football Ferns captain, captain of the North Carolina Courage in the NWSL
- Owen Glenn, Businessman
- Graeme Hart, New Zealand's Richest Man
- John Hart, former All Blacks coach
- Latha Hegde, Bollywood Actress
- Tarun Nethula, New Zealand national cricket team (Blackcaps) member
- Clinton Randell, New Zealand Idol Reality Show Contestant
- Julian Sewell, comedian and digital satirist
- Nalini Singh, New York Times bestselling author
- Brett Steven, Tennis Player
- Evarn Tuimavave, New Zealand Warriors player

== Controversies ==
In 1995 the school adopted a peer-mediated programme called "Cool Schools" and with support from Peace Foundation had trained 200 of 2100 students to be mediators in Years 11 through 12. This programme is now the largest student mediation programme in New Zealand.

In March 2010, Mt Roskill Grammar School appeared on the TV3 Consumer Rights programme "Target" regarding the introduction of their new uniform and the three-year phase-in time, a costly introduction to parents of existing students. It was met with opposition by the student body but Greg Watson, the principal, pleaded ignorance to the issue and has stated that he had received positive support regarding it. Watson has not informed the school if a change will be made to the way the new school uniform will be introduced.

On 16 March 2011, Campbell Live, a TV3 current affairs programme aired an interview on bullying at Mount Roskill Grammar where a member of the study body had been bullied to a point that she spent "12 lessons in the Dean's office or the administration area across a 7-day period". The school since resolved the matter.

In 2010s the school scrubbed its girls' rugby team due to fighting, but brought it under control by 2015.

== Related links ==
- Official site
- Education Review Office (ERO) reports for Mount Roskill Grammar School
