= Arthur Purchas =

Welsh-New Zealander clergyman (1821–1906)

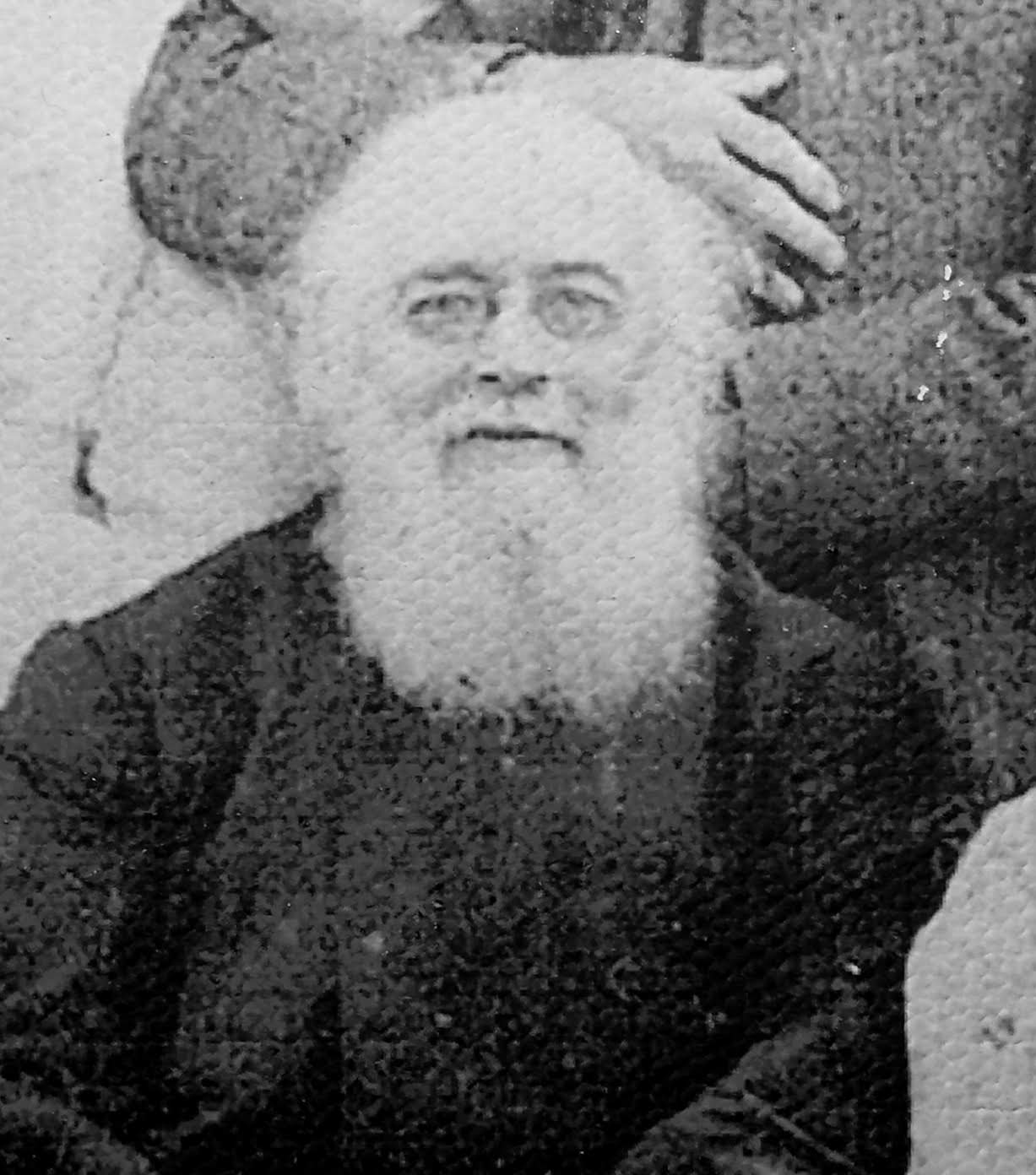
- Arthur Purchas in 1895
- Born: Arthur Guyon Purchas; 27 September 1821; St. Arvans, Wye Valley, Monmouthshire, Wales
- Died: 28 May 1906 (aged 84); Hastings Borough, Colony of New Zealand
- Burial place: Purewa Cemetery, Meadowbank, Remuera Road Board District, Colony of New Zealand; 36.872888°S 174.831364°E
- Other name: Rata Patiti
- Occupations: Clergyman, missionary, surgeon, musician, engineer, inventor, pioneer, geologist and botanist
- Relatives: Albert Purchas (brother); Guyon Purchas (nephew)

Arthur Guyon Purchas (27 September 1821 – 28 May 1906) was a clergyman, missionary, surgeon, musician, engineer, inventor, pioneer, geologist and botanist born at St. Arvans in the Wye Valley, Monmouthshire, Wales, who lived most of his life in Auckland, New Zealand. He was the father of fourteen children and an important figure during British colonisation of New Zealand, described as an 'amazingly versatile colonist'.

== Early life ==
Purchas was born at St. Arvans in the Wye Valley, Monmouthshire, Wales, on 27 September 1821.

In 1836, he was apprenticed to a doctor. He began studying at Guy's Hospital in London, England in 1839 under doctors Addison and Bright, gaining his M.R.C.S. and L.S.A. after three years on 29 September 1842. He was subsequently appointed resident surgeon at Southern and Toxteth Hospital in Liverpool. While studying, Purchas heard about possible missionary work in New Zealand from Bishop George Selwyn.

== Emigration to New Zealand ==
In October 1844, Purchas travelled to New Zealand as surgeon on board the ship Slains Castle. He arrived in Nelson on 26 January 1845, where he met Bishop Selwyn. He travelled to several parts of New Zealand, including Nelson, Wellington, New Plymouth and Auckland, before returning to England. On 27 December 1845, he married Olivia Challinor, daughter of Charles Challinor, in Liverpool.

In April 1846 Arthur and Olivia Purchas emigrated to New Zealand, visiting Sydney, Australia on their way. They left Sydney for Auckland on 3 October 1846. He learnt to speak and write the Māori language fluently and continued work as a doctor and a missionary. He was appointed to the Parish of Onehunga (which additionally included Epsom, Remuera, Otahuhu, Waiuku and Manukau districts), inducted vicar of St Peter's Church and ordained deacon on 19 September 1847.

In 1848, Purchas met and helped introduce future British Prime Minister Robert Gascoyne-Cecil to New Zealand.

In 1850, Purchas became the first European to discover the Huntly coalfields.

Purchas was ordained priest on 18 December 1853.

In 1857, Purchas supervised the first caesarean birth in New Zealand. In his medical career, he successfully operated on a number of women suffering abdominal cancer, a dangerous procedure at the time. In 1858, he discovered the Drury coalfields.

Purchas was known for his interest in relations between the British and Māori, seeing education as a priority for the Māori. It has been noted that Purchas "played a part in fostering the growth of respect and understanding between Maori and Pakeha".

Purchas was important to the construction of St Bride's Church in Mauku. Purchas was the chairman of a committee for establishing a church at Mauku and was the architect of the church. Purchas also designed St Stephen's Church in Tuahiwi and the Selwyn Church in Mangere East.

In March 1861, Purchas and James Ninnis were granted the first New Zealand patent (lodged 10 October 1860), for a plant fibre dressing process and leaf-stripping machine invention installed at their flax mill on the Waitangi Stream at Waiuku. This was accompanied with the enactment of the Purchas and Ninnis Flax Patent Act 1860. Purchas was instrumental in the flax industry. Frederick Hutton, who owned and operated a flax mill at Churchill on the Waikato River, noted, in an 1870 Auckland Institute lecture on the subject, that Purchas and Ninnis had introduced iron stampers to the process.

Purchas' interest in science saw him work with geologist and botanist Ferdinand von Hochstetter. Together they surveyed the Auckland volcanic field.

== Later life ==
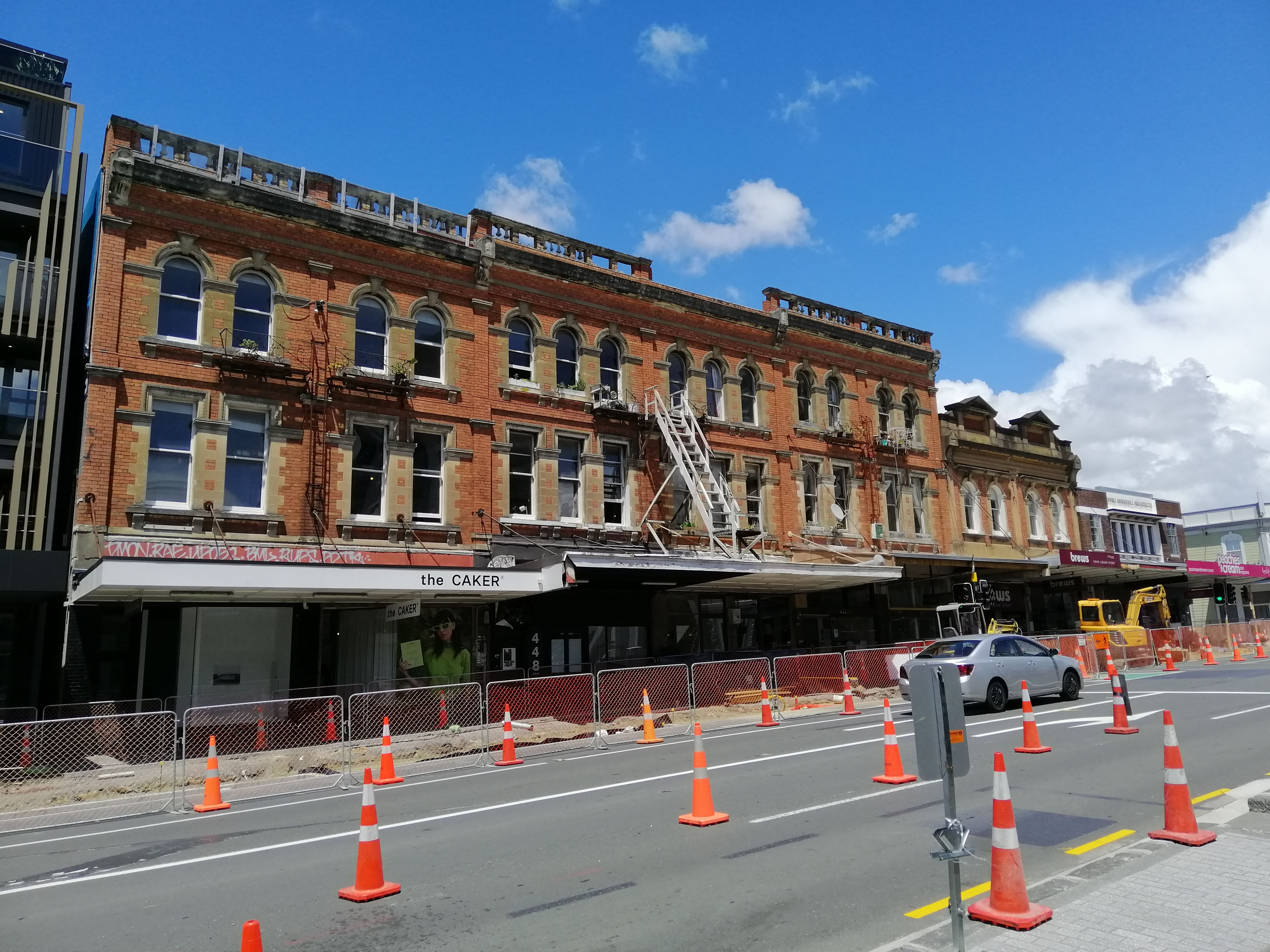
444-472 Karangahape Road, Auckland

Purchas became a founding member of the Auckland Institute in 1867, later becoming the president of the Institute in 1880.

Purchas was the musical director for the New Zealand Anglican Diocese, leading him to produce two national hymnals in both English and Māori. He compiled and arranged The Tune Book for the New Zealand Hymnal. Purchas also taught singing to children at St John's College in Auckland. In addition, he taught music to the blind and invented a system of reading music for the blind; a quick method for preparing metal plates to print braille.

He designed the initial Mangere Bridge, which opened in January 1875.

Purchas resided in Onehunga, where he continued his practise as vicar, until he relinquished the Parish of Onehunga and moved with his family to Penrose in 1875. Immediately following, he recommenced medical practise as a doctor.

In 1883–84, Purchas had a block (444–472) built on Karangahape Road, Auckland, designed by Edward Bartley.

=== Death ===
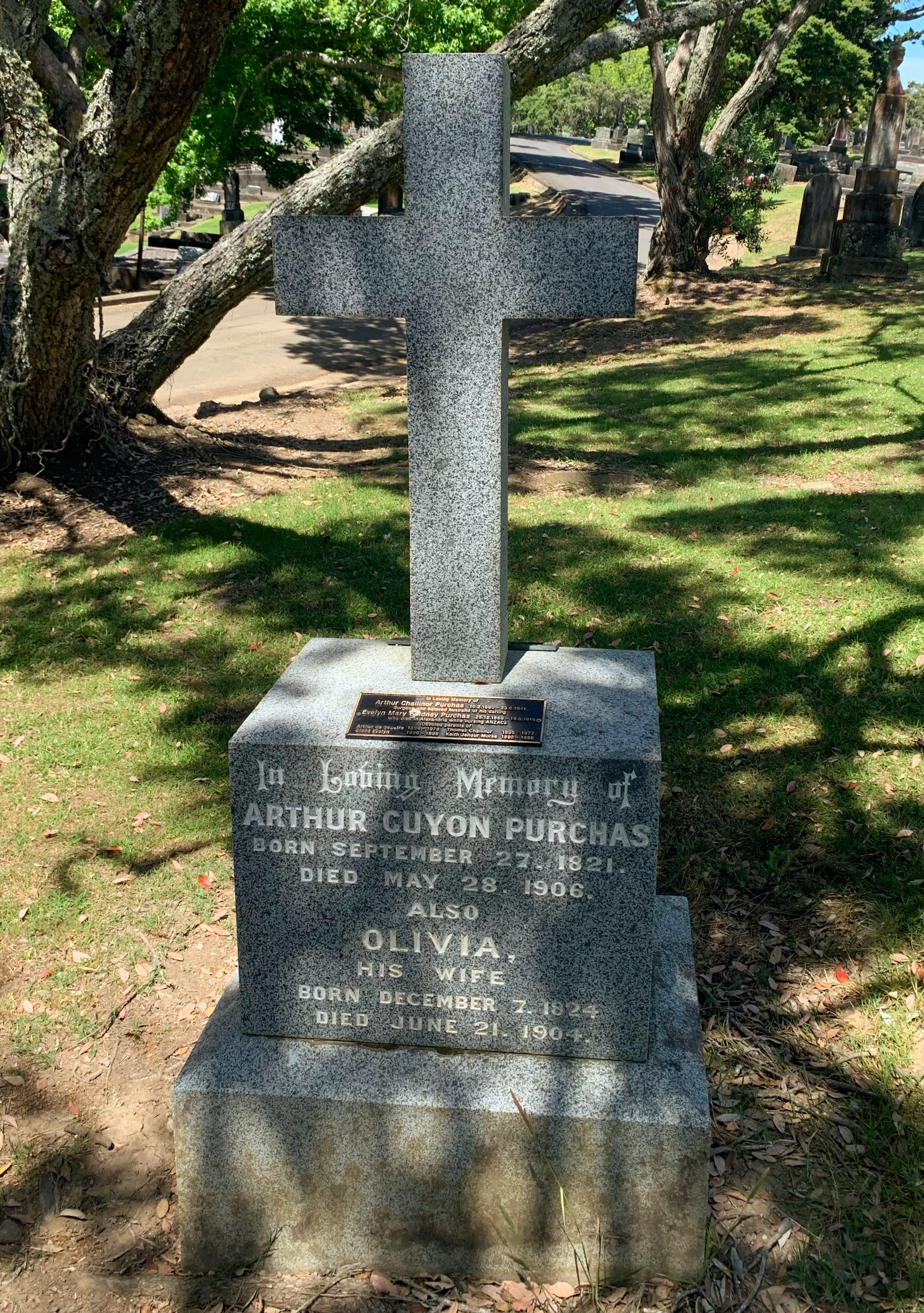
Purchas’ headstone at Purewa Cemetery.

Purchas died on 28 May 1906. He was buried at Purewa Cemetery in Meadowbank, Auckland, on 1 June 1906. In a tribute, the New Zealand Herald stated with respect to the British colony of New Zealand, that "he laid the foundations of all that is good and true in the social life of the colony." He has also been described as the 'Leonardo da Vinci of New Zealand', and "perhaps the most gifted person ever to come to this country [New Zealand]".

== Legacy ==
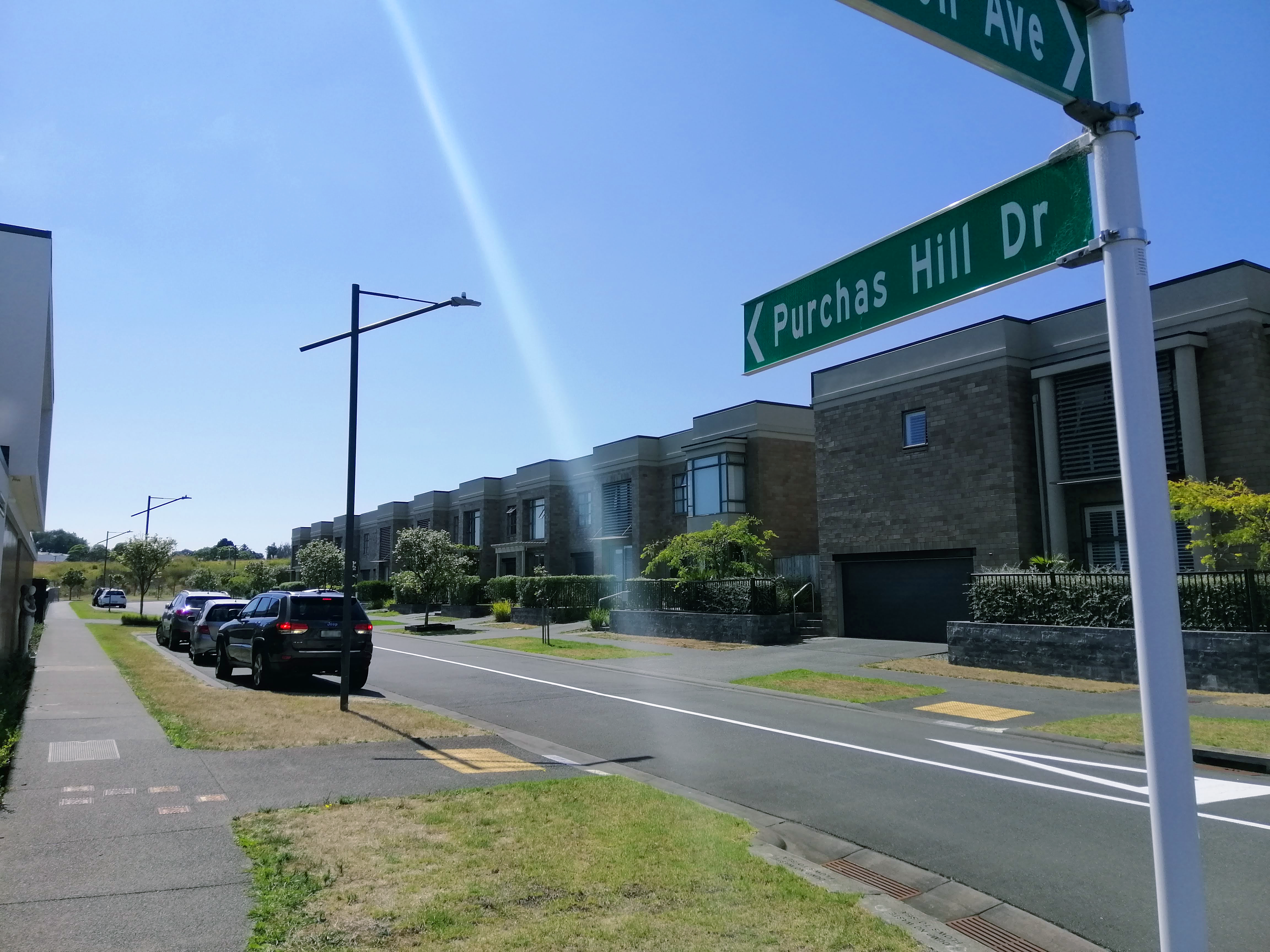
A photo looking down Purchas Hill Drive in Stonefields, Auckland.

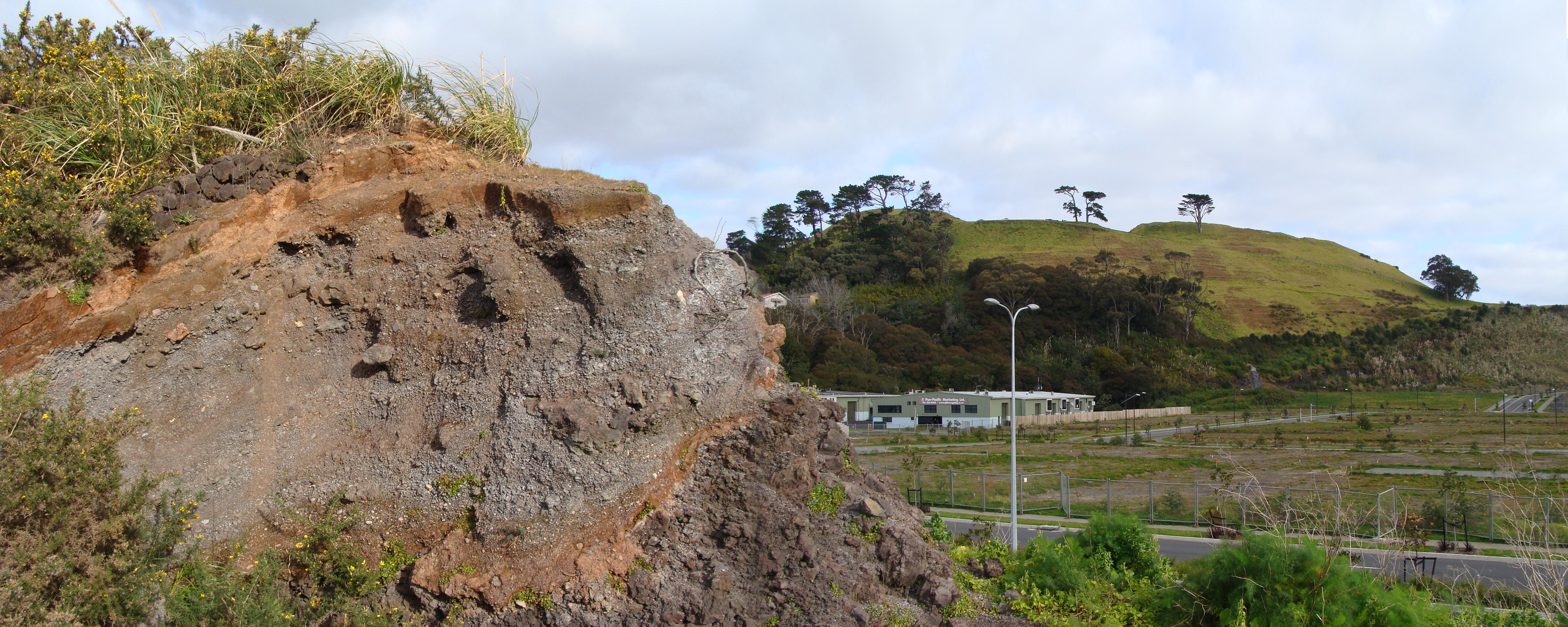
A remnant of the predominantly quarried Purchas Hill, looking over College Road, with Mount Wellington in the background.

Purchas Hill in Stonefields, Auckland was named after Purchas in gratitude for his work on the Auckland volcanic field by von Hochstetter. Purchas Hill Drive is located where Purchas Hill stood before it was quarried.

Animal species named after Arthur Purchas:

- Omphalorissa purchasi, a New Zealand snail discovered by Purchas and Ferdinand von Hochstetter.
- Icerya purchasi, cottony cushion scale, a scale insect originally described in 1878 from specimens collected in New Zealand by Purchas.
