= Point England =

- Suburb
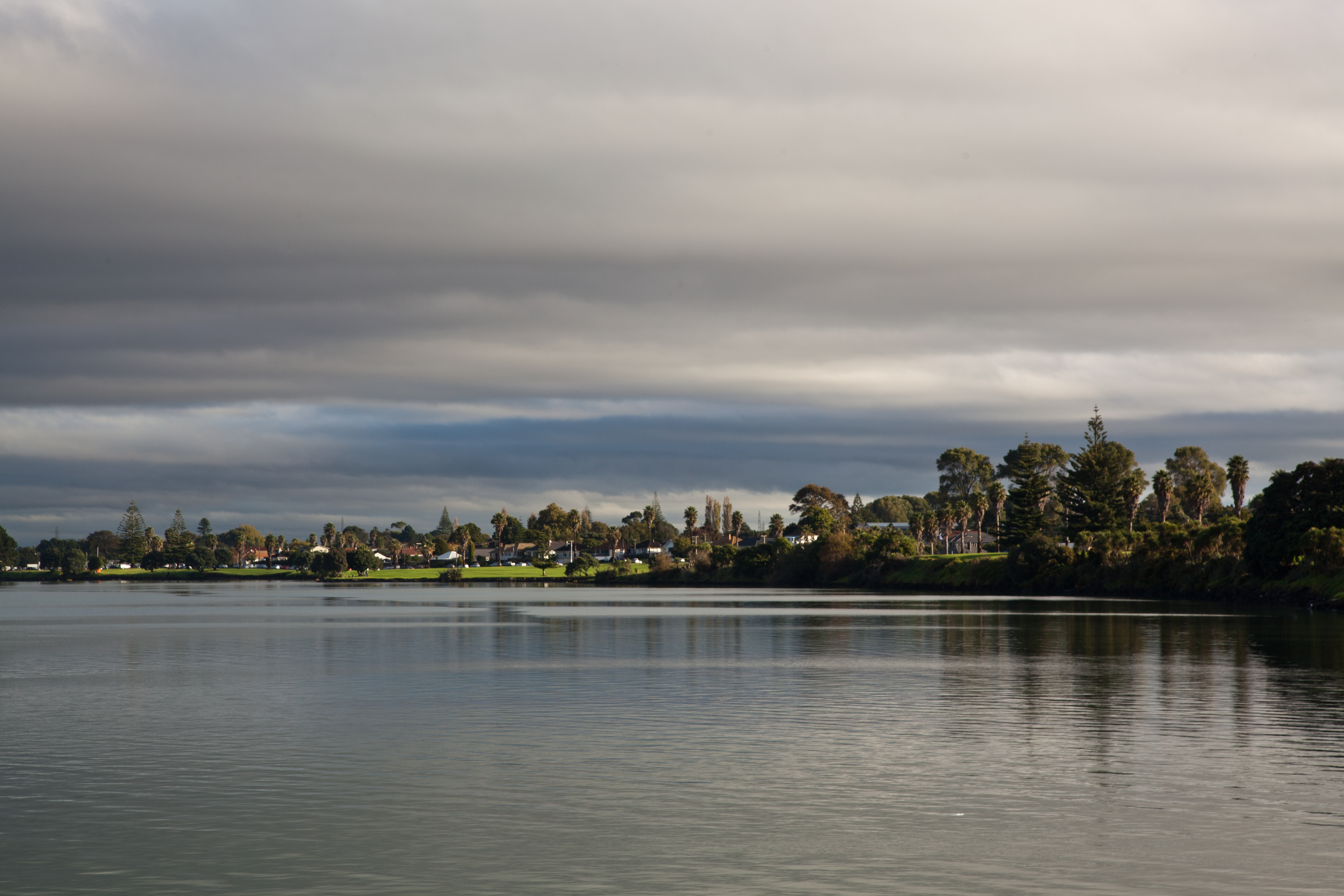
- Point England from the Tamaki River
- Interactive map of Point England
- Country: New Zealand
- City: Auckland
- Local authority: Auckland Council
- Electoral ward: Maungakiekie-Tāmaki ward
- Local board: Maungakiekie-Tāmaki Local Board
- Board subdivision: Tāmaki

Area
  - Land: 149 ha (370 acres)

Population (June 2025)
  - Total: 5,620
  - Density: 3,770/km^{2} (9,770/sq mi)

St Johns	Glen Innes	Wai o Taiki Bay
	Point England	(Tamaki River), Half Moon Bay
Stonefields	Tamaki	Farm Cove

Point England is a suburb of Auckland, New Zealand. It is under the local governance of the Auckland Council.

== Demographics ==
Point England covers 1.49 km^{2} (0.58 sq mi) and had an estimated population of 5,620 as of June 2025, with a population density of 3,772 people per km^{2}.

Historical population
Year	Pop.	±% p.a.
2006	4,227	—
2013	4,305	+0.26%
2018	4,923	+2.72%
2023	4,806	−0.48%

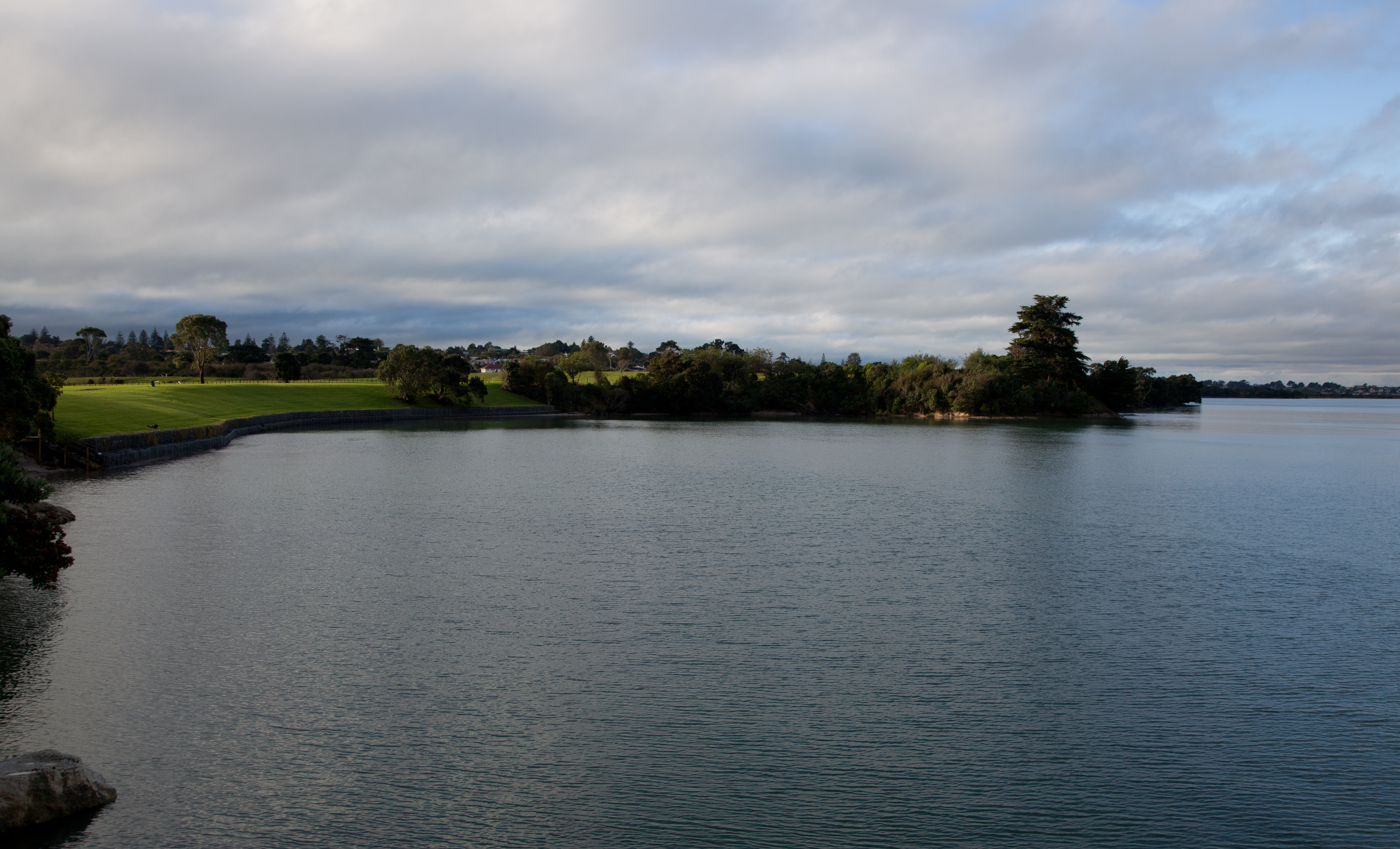
Point England and the Tamaki River

Point England had a population of 4,806 in the 2023 New Zealand census, a decrease of 117 people (−2.4%) since the 2018 census, and an increase of 501 people (11.6%) since the 2013 census. There were 2,364 males, 2,424 females and 18 people of other genders in 1,437 dwellings. 3.0% of people identified as LGBTIQ+. The median age was 31.1 years (compared with 38.1 years nationally). There were 1,098 people (22.8%) aged under 15 years, 1,209 (25.2%) aged 15 to 29, 1,971 (41.0%) aged 30 to 64, and 525 (10.9%) aged 65 or older.

People could identify as more than one ethnicity. The results were 26.7% European (Pākehā); 23.8% Māori; 50.2% Pasifika; 17.4% Asian; 2.4% Middle Eastern, Latin American and African New Zealanders (MELAA); and 1.2% other, which includes people giving their ethnicity as "New Zealander". English was spoken by 88.6%, Māori language by 6.1%, Samoan by 9.2%, and other languages by 27.4%. No language could be spoken by 2.9% (e.g. too young to talk). New Zealand Sign Language was known by 0.6%. The percentage of people born overseas was 37.5, compared with 28.8% nationally.

Religious affiliations were 48.2% Christian, 1.4% Hindu, 3.8% Islam, 2.6% Māori religious beliefs, 2.7% Buddhist, 0.3% New Age, and 1.1% other religions. People who answered that they had no religion were 32.5%, and 7.7% of people did not answer the census question.

Of those at least 15 years old, 654 (17.6%) people had a bachelor's or higher degree, 1,608 (43.4%) had a post-high school certificate or diploma, and 1,446 (39.0%) people exclusively held high school qualifications. The median income was $28,200, compared with $41,500 nationally. 237 people (6.4%) earned over $100,000 compared to 12.1% nationally. The employment status of those at least 15 was that 1,629 (43.9%) people were employed full-time, 354 (9.5%) were part-time, and 210 (5.7%) were unemployed.

Individual statistical areas
Name	Area (km^{2})	Population	Density (per km^{2})	Dwellings	Median age	Median income
Point England North	0.94	2,652	2,821	777	31.2 years	$25,100
Point England South	0.56	2,151	3,841	660	31.0 years	$34,700
New Zealand					38.1 years	$41,500

== History ==
Ngāti Pāoa established a foothold along the western side of the Tamaki River and at Mokoia (present day Panmure) in around 1780. Extensive settlement and agriculture by Ngāti Pāoa in the Mokoia area was recorded by the missionaries John Butler and Samuel Marsden around 1820. Mokoia was a significant settlement in the region. Butler estimated four thousand inhabitants. When Butler climbed what was Maungarei / Mount Wellington he saw twenty villages in the valley below and "with a single glance, beheld the greatest portion of cultivated land I had ever met within one place in New Zealand." Marsden stated that "Their houses are superior to most I've met with. Their stores were full of potatoes containing some thousands of baskets and they had some very fine hogs.”

Further evidence of active settlement in the area was noted by Captain D'Urville in 1827, on his second visit to New Zealand, when he engaged with Ngāti Paoa chiefs Tawhiti and Te Rangui at the entrance to the Tāmaki River. D'Urville was led along Te Tō Waka, the canoe portage at Ōtāhuhu toward the Manukau, and noted that on the eastern side of the Tāmaki, they "saw the village of Ourouroa and a number of canoes with a great many inhabitants." On his return, he witnessed that “crowds of natives were looking for shellfish in the mud and the rocks at the entrance were covered with men fishing.”

Between 1836 and 1839, Ngāti Paoa was among five iwi negotiating transactions with a missionary for a large block in Tamaki which allowed Maori to occupy the land without conflict. In 1837, missionaries noted on the back of one of the deeds that in selling the land, iwi would retain the use of at least one third of the block, around 83,000 acres. Sixteen Ngāti Paoa rangatira signed the Treaty of Waitangi at Karaka Bay at the entrance of the Tamaki River on 4 March 1840. In 1842, the Crown granted 5,500 acres to the missionaries and retained the remainder of the land. Following protest, some of the land was returned to Māori, however, Ngāti Paoa did not receive land or compensation and were not permitted to remain on the land set aside for their use in 1837.

In the 1920s, Point England was under consideration as the site of an air base but this initiative was eventually abandoned due to the cost of the land. At the time, the land had been subdivided and the cost of a quarter acre was around £450. In 1935, a proposal to establish an airport on 244 acres at the eastern end of Point England Road was proposed as it was only eight miles from the Auckland central Post Office. At a meeting of Auckland metropolitan local authorities in May 1938, a decision was to abandon the Point England site for one at Manukau harbour.

On 20 March, 2021, the Crown and Ngāti Paoa signed a Deed of Settlement. In its settlement with Ngāti Paoa, the crown acknowledged that the iwi had contributed to the establishment and development of New Zealand and that it took land in the Tāmaki block in which Ngāti Paoa had interests without compensation.

== Education ==
Point England School and Ruapotaka School are coeducational full primary schools (years 1-8) with rolls of 488 and 150 students respectively as of October 2025.

== Redevelopment ==
Point England is included in the redevelopment area of the Tamaki Regeneration Company. The company is jointly owned by the government and Auckland Council, and was formed in 2014 with strategic objectives of social transformation, economic development and increased housing availability. The initiative aims to transform the Tamaki area over 15-20 years. The population of the area is expected to double when the existing social housing has been demolished and replaced.
