= Purchas Hill =

Volcano in the Auckland volcanic field, New Zealand

- Te Tauoma
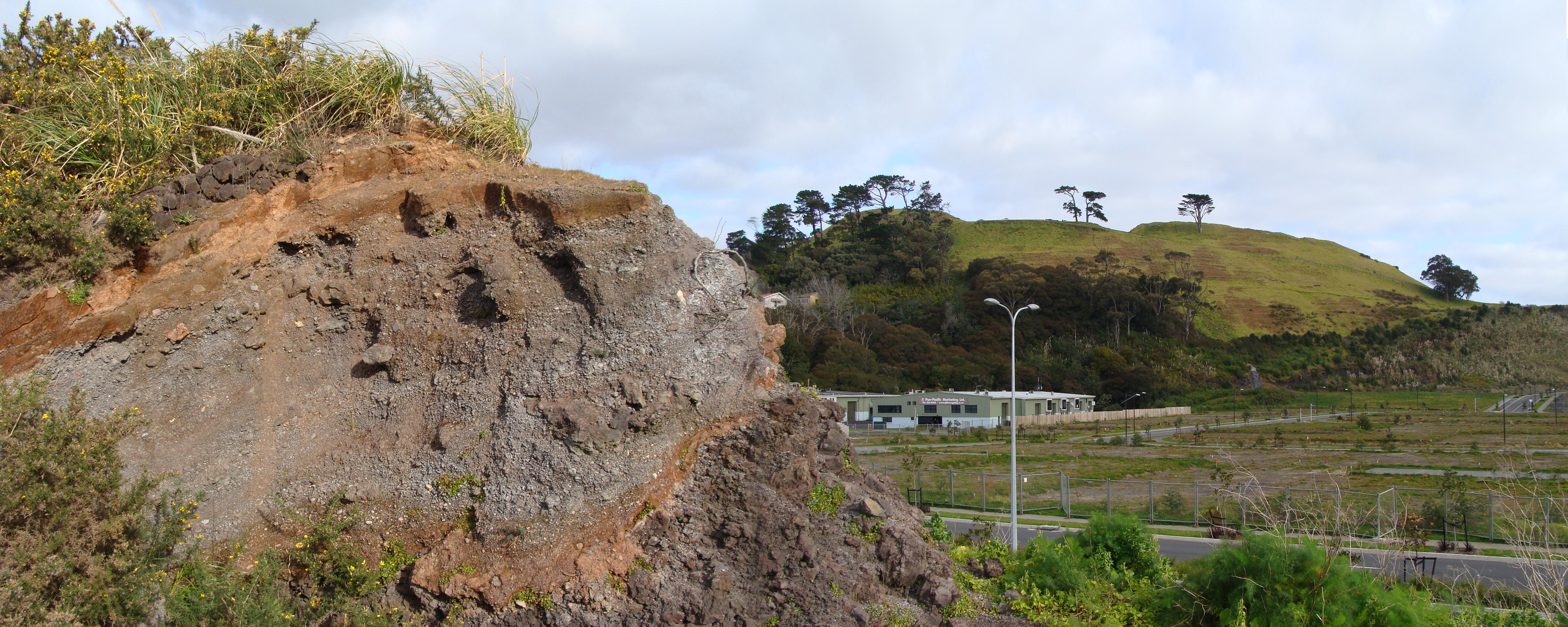
- Quarried remnant of Purchas Hill, with Maungarei / Mount Wellington in the background

Highest point
- Coordinates: 36°53′14″S 174°50′51″E

Geography
- Location within New Zealand
- Location: Stonefields, Auckland, New Zealand

Geology
- Volcanic field: Auckland volcanic field

Purchas Hill (also Te Tauoma) is one of the volcanoes in the Auckland volcanic field.

Purchas Hill was a twin-cratered scoria cone around 50 metres high, located north of Maungarei / Mount Wellington, before it was predominantly quarried away. The scoria cone sat in the middle of its large explosion crater with a surrounding tuff ring. It erupted about 10,000 years ago, shortly before the eruption of its larger neighbour, Mount Wellington.

== History ==
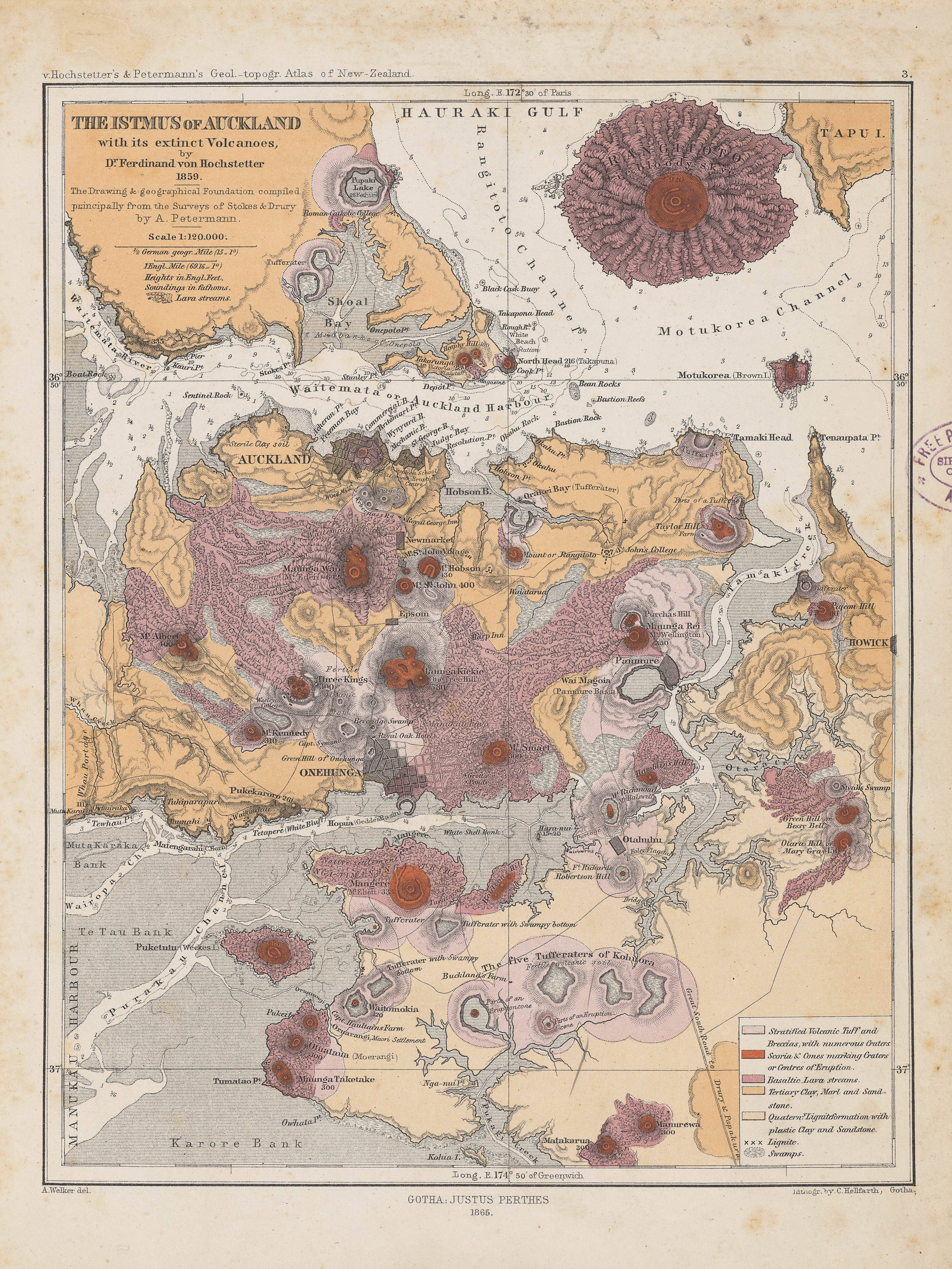
A map of the Auckland volcanic field by Hochstetter from 1859, showcasing Purchas Hill amongst other volcanoes.

Te Tauoma was the site where the Ngāi Tai descendants of Te Kete-ana-taua lived, often fighting with nearby Ngāi Tāhuhu who lived around Ōtāhuhu / Mount Richmond.

In the mid-1800s, geologist Ferdinand von Hochstetter named the mountain after the Reverend Dr Arthur Guyon Purchas (1821–1906), in gratitude for his help with geological work on the field.

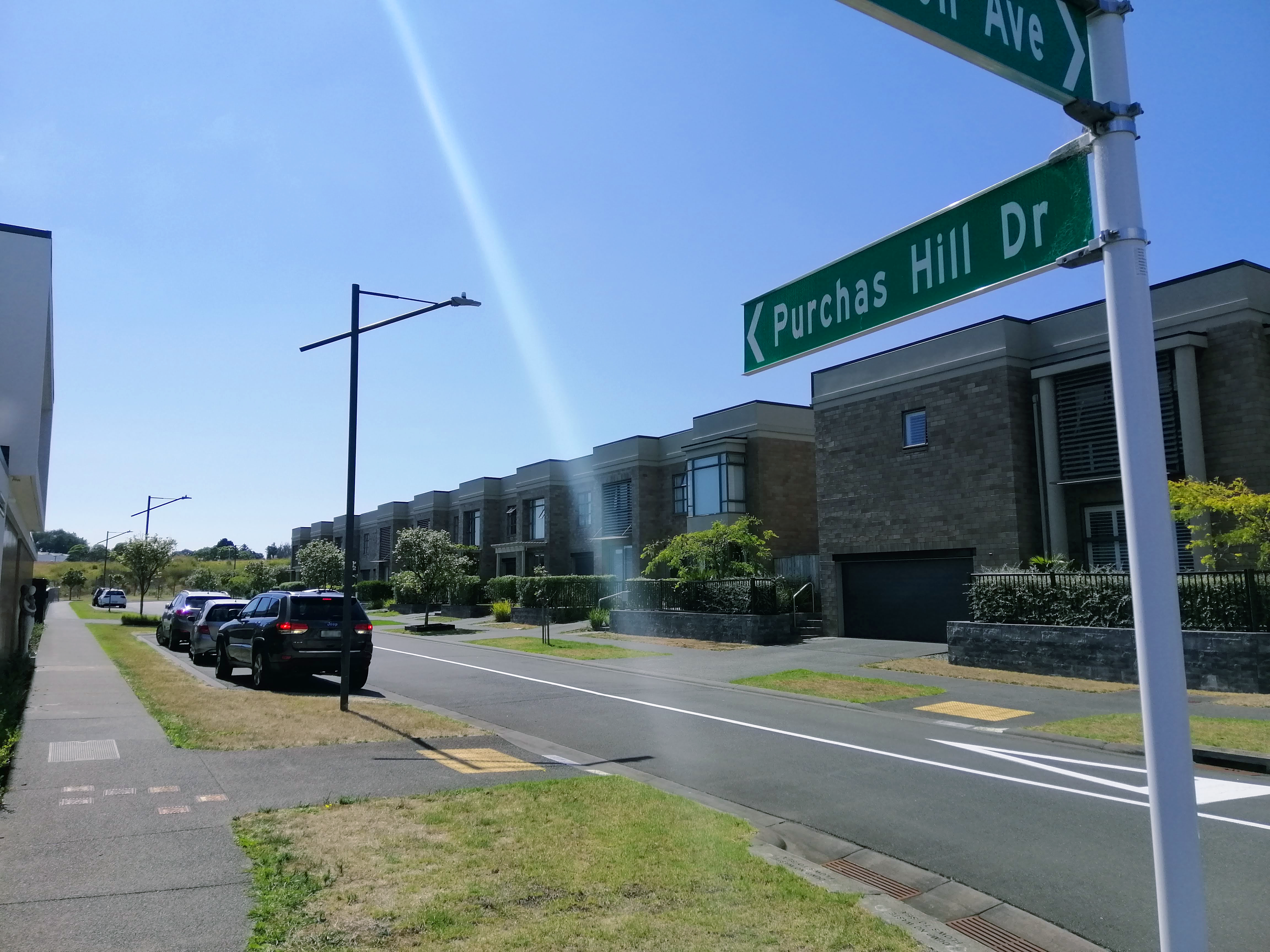
A photo looking down Purchas Hill Drive in Stonefields, Auckland.

The scant remnants of Purchas Hill lie on what is largely a wasteland in the suburb of Stonefields in Auckland.

The road Purchas Hill Drive is located where Purchas Hill used to be.
