= Panmure, New Zealand =

Panmure
- Suburb
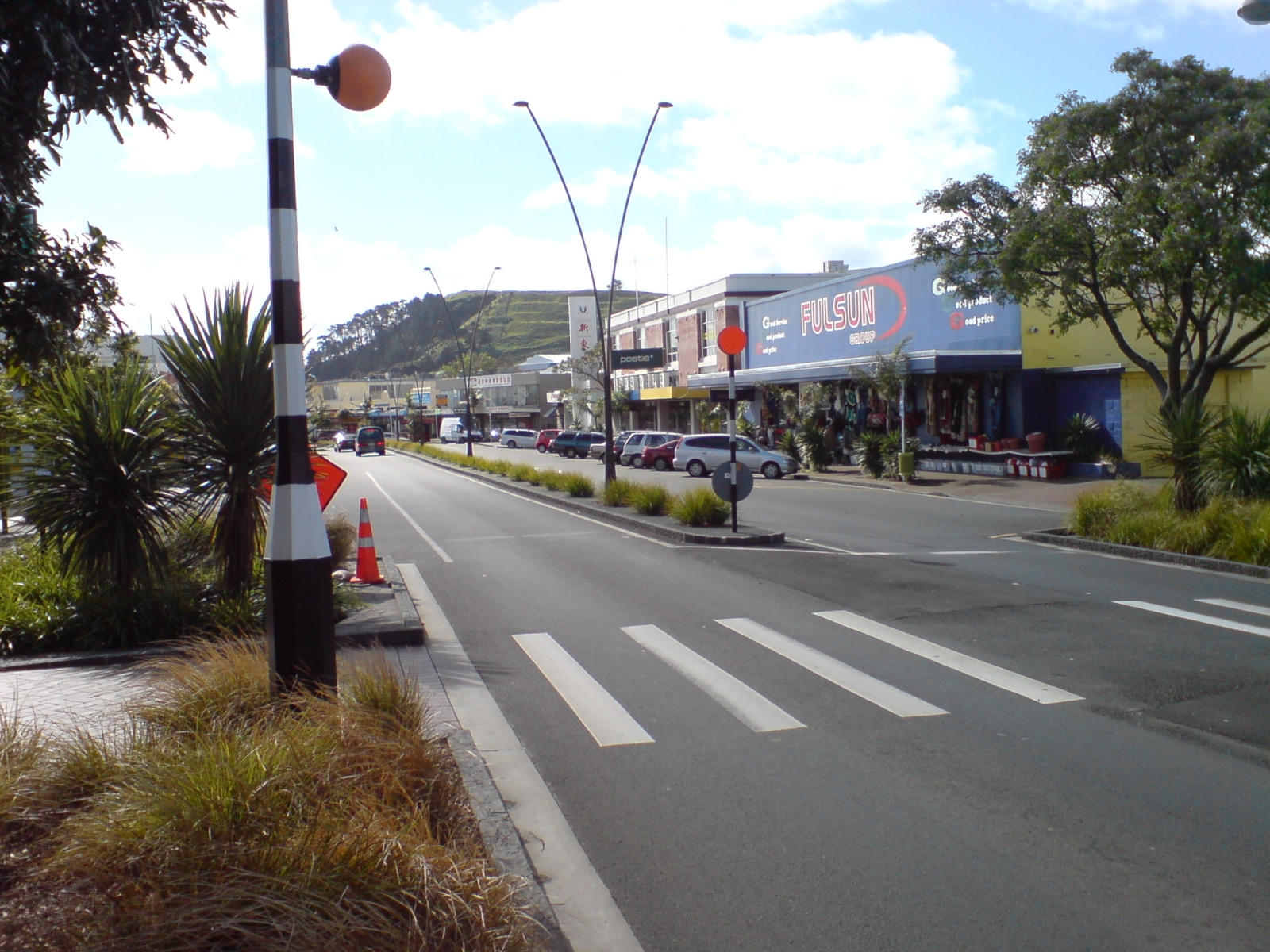
- Panmure Town Centre
- Interactive map of Panmure
- Coordinates: 36.899892°S 174.854959°E
- Country: New Zealand
- City: Auckland
- Local authority: Auckland Council
- Electoral ward: Maungakiekie-Tāmaki ward
- Local board: Maungakiekie-Tāmaki Local Board
- Board subdivision: Tāmaki
- Established: 1848 (European)

Area
  - Land: 166 ha (410 acres)

Population (June 2025)
  - Total: 4,200
  - Density: 2,500/km^{2} (6,600/sq mi)
- Train stations: Panmure Train Station

Stonefields	Tāmaki, Point England	(Tāmaki River)
Mount Wellington	Panmure	(Tāmaki River)
Mount Wellington	Mount Wellington	Pakuranga

Panmure is an east Auckland suburb, in the North Island of New Zealand. It is located 11 kilometres southeast of the Auckland CBD, close to the western banks of the Tāmaki River and the northern shore of the Panmure Basin (or Te Kai a Hiku). To the north lies the suburb of Tāmaki, and to the west is the cone of Maungarei / Mount Wellington.

== Demographics ==
Panmure covers 1.66 km^{2} (0.64 sq mi) and had an estimated population of 4,200 as of June 2025, with a population density of 2,530 people per km^{2}.

Panmure West is mostly commercial and industrial. Panmure East is mostly residential.

Historical population
Year	Pop.	±% p.a.
2006	2,919	—
2013	3,258	+1.58%
2018	3,651	+2.30%
2023	3,723	+0.39%

Panmure had a population of 3,723 in the 2023 New Zealand census, an increase of 72 people (2.0%) since the 2018 census, and an increase of 465 people (14.3%) since the 2013 census. There were 1,881 males, 1,824 females and 18 people of other genders in 1,338 dwellings. 3.9% of people identified as LGBTIQ+. There were 558 people (15.0%) aged under 15 years, 789 (21.2%) aged 15 to 29, 1,848 (49.6%) aged 30 to 64, and 525 (14.1%) aged 65 or older.

People could identify as more than one ethnicity. The results were 38.8% European (Pākehā); 14.4% Māori; 21.6% Pasifika; 37.2% Asian; 2.7% Middle Eastern, Latin American and African New Zealanders (MELAA); and 1.6% other, which includes people giving their ethnicity as "New Zealander". English was spoken by 89.0%, Māori language by 3.0%, Samoan by 4.0%, and other languages by 33.9%. No language could be spoken by 2.9% (e.g. too young to talk). New Zealand Sign Language was known by 0.6%. The percentage of people born overseas was 47.8, compared with 28.8% nationally.

Religious affiliations were 41.8% Christian, 3.6% Hindu, 3.1% Islam, 1.5% Māori religious beliefs, 2.8% Buddhist, 0.4% New Age, 0.2% Jewish, and 1.6% other religions. People who answered that they had no religion were 39.2%, and 6.0% of people did not answer the census question.

Of those at least 15 years old, 945 (29.9%) people had a bachelor's or higher degree, 1,251 (39.5%) had a post-high school certificate or diploma, and 960 (30.3%) people exclusively held high school qualifications. 357 people (11.3%) earned over $100,000 compared to 12.1% nationally. The employment status of those at least 15 was that 1,752 (55.4%) people were employed full-time, 300 (9.5%) were part-time, and 111 (3.5%) were unemployed.

Individual statistical areas
Name	Area (km^{2})	Population	Density (per km^{2})	Dwellings	Median age	Median income
Panmure West	0.64	333	520	147	34.2 years	$31,500
Panmure East	1.02	3,390	3,324	1,191	36.8 years	$43,500
New Zealand					38.1 years	$41,500

== History ==
=== Māori history ===
The Māori name for the area from Panmure south-west towards the Manukau Harbour area was Tauoma Te Tō Waka and Karetu, two of the traditional portages between the Waitematā Harbour and the Manukau Harbour were near here. 4.6 km up the Tāmaki River, Māori would beach their waka (canoes) at the end of a small creek (that now passes under the southern motorway) and drag them overland (where Portage Road is now) to the Manukau Harbour.

In the mid to late 18th century, land along the Western shores of the Tāmaki River were given as a tuku (strategic gift) by Te Tahuri, daughter of Te Horetā of the Ngāti Whātua Ōrākei hapū Ngā Oho, to the Hauraki Gulf iwi Ngāti Pāoa. Te Tahuri's sister Te Kehu had been married to Te Putu, an important figure within Ngāti Pāoa, for which Te Tahuri was derided and called foolish by people concerned by what the outcomes of such a tuku would cause. Ngāti Pāoa leader Tangi-te-ruru built Mauināina pā (also known as Maunga-inaina and Taumata-inaina) at the headland between the Panmure Basin and Tāmaki River, and along the Tāmaki River was an extensive kāinga (unfortified village) called Mokoia. In the late 18th century, war broke out between Ngāti Whātua and Ngāti Pāoa after a joint shark hunting trip, and both Te Tahuri and her husband Tomoaure were killed in the resulting skirmishes, with hostilities ending around the year 1793. By the time missionaries Samuel Marsden and John Gare Butler visited the isthmus in 1820, there were thousands of inhabitants living along the shores of the Tāmaki River at Mokoia.

During the Musket Wars in late September 1821, Mokoia and Mauināina pā were attacked by a Ngāpuhi taua led by Hongi Hika, Pōmare I (Ngāti Manu) and Tuhi (Te Ngare Raumati of Pāroa), during a time when the Tāmaki isthmus was relatively unprotected, as many Ngāti Whātua warriors were touring the lower North Island on the Āmiowhenua war party expedition. Defenders of the pā placed stakes into the landing areas to slow the Ngāpuhi taua's progress, and over the course of two days, the taua was pelted with stones. When the pā was under siege, the taua found that the muskets were ineffective due to the defenders sheltering behind an earthen wall, so built a platform which overlooked the pā, and shot at those who were inside. The fighting devastated what had been the Ngāti Pāoa population centre of the Auckland isthmus during pre-European times which had a population of about 7,000. Three thousand men with up to 100 muskets took part in the defense of the pā but after a close and bitter battle were defeated by the combined northern alliance who had between 500 and 1000 muskets. Mokoia and Mauināina pā were destroyed, and the land became tapu for Ngāti Pāoa due to the large number of deaths, and was not resettled.

=== European history ===
Panmure was then established as a fencible settlement, where retired soldiers were contracted to defend the settlement in return for land. The soldiers had to give 12 days military service per year and parade on Sunday in full military equipment. The only time they were called to arms was in 1851 when a flotilla of 20 waka took about 350 warriors to Mechanics Bay to attack Auckland. The Panmure fencibles were issued ammunition to defend the Tāmaki River in the event of an armed attack by Māori. Only the Onehunga fencibles were marched to the hill overlooking Mechanics Bay to join a British line regiment. In the 1863 attack on Auckland the government used mainly professional soldiers instead.

Panmure benefitted from being on the route between Auckland and the much larger fencibles settlement of Howick in the 1800s. People and goods used the ferry at the narrow point below Mokoia pā.

Until about the middle of the 20th century, Panmure remained a prosperous but mostly pastoral setting, and described as "a quarter of a square mile of farmlets surrounding a sleepy village that boasted little more than a church, post office, a handful of shops, and a two-storey hotel that was widely known from horse and buggy days". Panmure Township Road District merged with Mount Wellington Borough in 1955.

After World War II, Panmure began to grow and become a commercial centre as additional housing was built nearby and thoroughfare continued via Pakuranga.

== Local government ==
The Panmure Highway District was established 8 January 1863 and included the area of Mount Wellington. On 13 January 1865 the Panmure Township Road District was formed from this district but did not start operation for 3 years. The Panmure Township Road District was amalgamated with the Borough of Mount Wellington in 1955.

== Transport ==
Work was completed on the Panmure section (Stage 1) of the Auckland Transport project called the AMETI (Auckland-Manukau Eastern Transport Initiative) aimed at improving transport connections in the southeastern suburbs of Auckland. The upgraded Panmure railway station opened in January 2014, with a new dedicated bus exchange that enabled transfers between services and reduced congestion. Te Horeta Rd opened on 2 November 2015, marking the last major milestone of the first stage. Other related upgrades included the building of three new bridges, new cycle paths and foot paths.

A dedicated busway between Panmure and Pakuranga was completed in 2021 as part of the second stage of AMETI. The remaining busway between Pakuranga and Botany is scheduled for completion in 2027.

Since the opening of the City Rail Link on 13 September 2026, the new East West train line now extends beyond the Auckland CBD, travelling via Waitematā station towards Swanson.

== Housing ==
The Tamaki Transformation Programme was announced in 2009 by Housing Minister Phil Heatley, with the aim of increasing housing stock and improving the condition of state-owned housing in the suburbs of Glen Innes, Point England and Panmure. In 2012, Auckland Council and the New Zealand government formed the Tāmaki Redevelopment Company with the aim of creating a "thriving, attractive, sustainable and self-reliant community through a series of interlinking and complimentary [sic] economic, social, urban space and housing projects".

Between 2014 and 2019, the project faced controversy and protests due to the evictions of residents from state-owned housing and concerns about privatisation. The Tāmaki Redevelopment Company, which rebranded as the Tāmaki Regeneration Company in 2016, pledged to find alternative housing for affected residents who wanted to remain in the Tāmaki area. However, an activist group called Tāmaki Housing Group claims that some residents were unable to find alternative housing in the area at the time of their eviction, due to a shortage in available housing. As of June 2026, the Tāmaki Regeneration Programme had built 1,798 houses since the project's inception, up from 554 in June 2019.

== Education ==
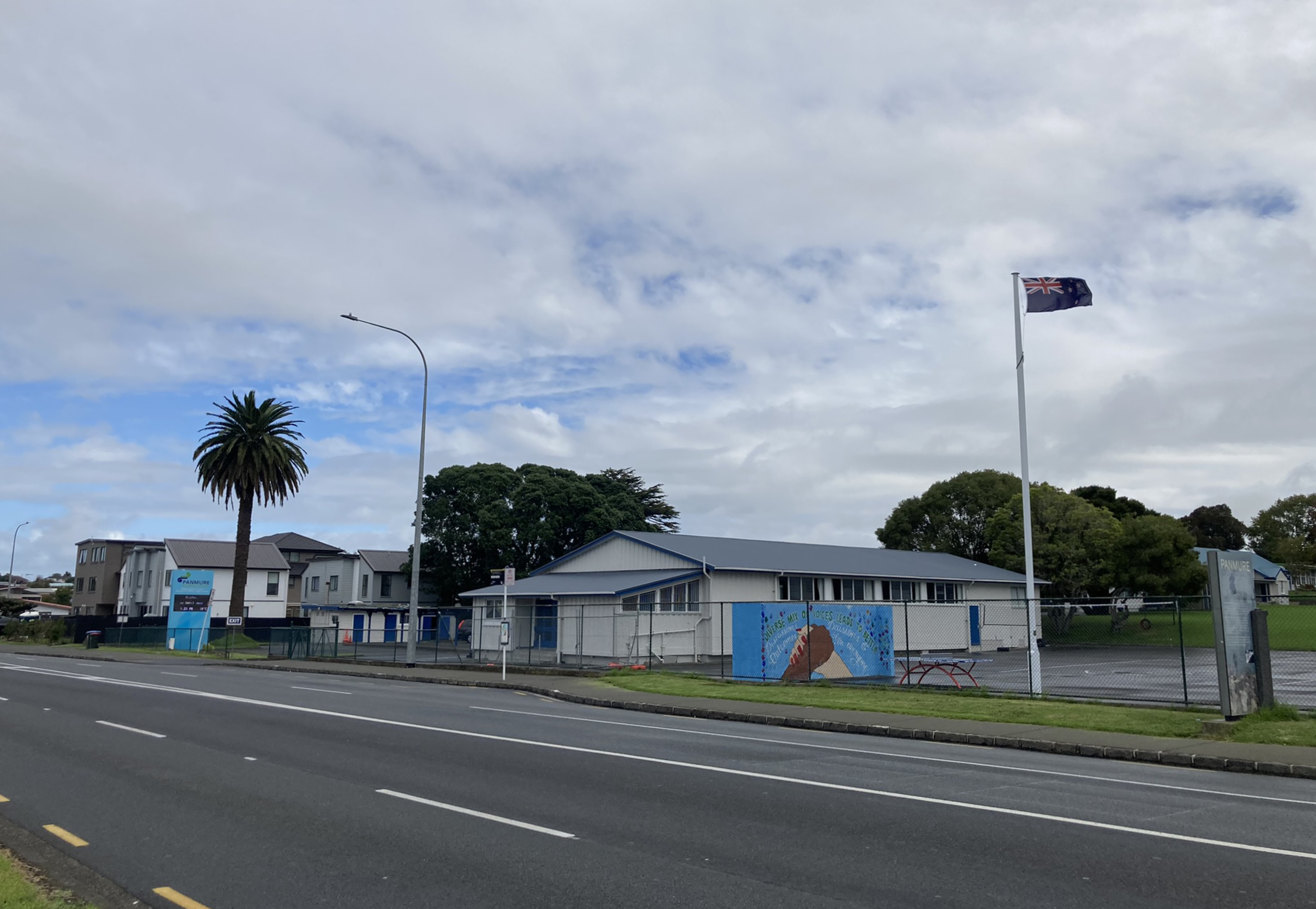
Panmure District School

Panmure Bridge School and Panmure District School are full primary schools (years 1–8) with rolls of 211 and 168 students, respectively.

St Patrick's School is a state-integrated Catholic full primary school (years 1–8) with a roll of 71.

Atea College is a private Christian composite school (years 1–13) with a roll of 17.

All these schools are coeducational. Rolls are as of July 2026.

== Notable buildings ==
- St Matthias' Church (Anglican)

== See also ==
- 2001 Panmure RSA killings
