= Farm Cove, New Zealand =

Farm Cove
- Suburb
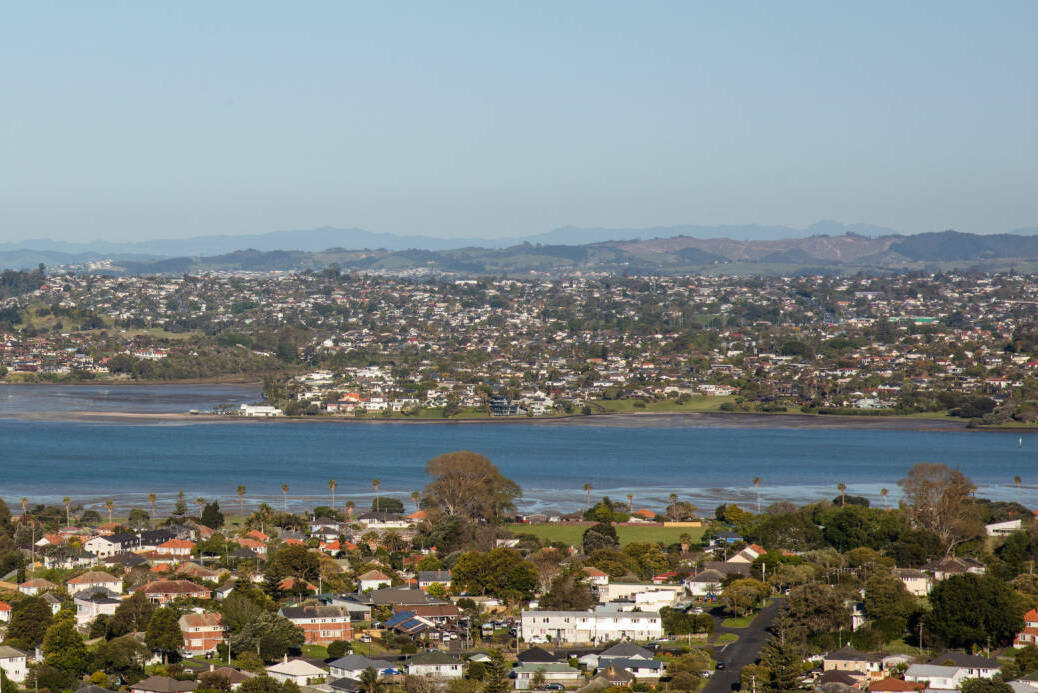
- View of Farm Cove from Maungarei
- Interactive map of Farm Cove
- Coordinates: 36.8957°S 174.8824°E
- Country: New Zealand
- City: Auckland
- Local authority: Auckland Council
- Electoral ward: Howick ward
- Local board: Howick Local Board

Area
  - Land: 84 ha (210 acres)

Population (June 2025)
  - Total: 2,170
  - Density: 2,600/km^{2} (6,700/sq mi)

| Point England | (Tāmaki River) | Half Moon Bay |
| Tāmaki | Farm Cove | Pakuranga |
| (Tāmaki River) | Sunnyhills | Highland Park |

Farm Cove is a suburb located in East Auckland, New Zealand. The suburb is in the Howick ward, one of the thirteen administrative divisions of Auckland. The Rotary Walkway Reserve runs through Farm Cove.

== Geography ==
Farm Cove is located on the eastern shores of the Tāmaki River. The Wakaaranga Creek forms a border to the north between Farm Cove and Half Moon Bay. A kauri tree fossil forest can be found around the shoreline of Farm Cove at Sanctuary Point, which may have formed after a volcanic eruption around 26,000 years ago.

== History ==
For the first 100 years of European settlement, Farm Cove was considered a rural area of Pakuranga. In 1843, settler Joseph Hargreaves purchased 83 acres of land around Farm Cove, and built a residence he called Butley, near the site of modern-day Farm Cove Intermediate. More settlers arrived in the wider area after 1847, when Howick was established as a defensive outpost for Auckland, by fencibles (retired British Army soldiers) and their families. A ferry operated between the Bramley Drive Reserve Beach and Point England between 1847 and 1865, transporting people across the Tāmaki River. In the 19th Century, the Gill dairy farm was established at Farm Cove, which supplied Auckland city.

The suburb was developed by Fletcher Construction in the late 1960s and early 1970s. Fletcher named the suburb after Joseph Hargreaves' farm house, which was demolished only a few years later in 1972. In 1971, the Pakuranga Junior Sailing Club moved to Farm Cove from Pakuranga, and in 1973 the Farm Cove Shopping Centre was opened.

In 1999, Farm Cove Observatory, a private observatory was established by Fred Goodfellow.

== Demographics ==
Farm Cove covers 0.84 km^{2} (0.32 sq mi) and had an estimated population of 2,170 as of June 2025, with a population density of 2,583 people per km^{2}.

Historical population
| Year | Pop. | ±% p.a. |
|---|---|---|
| 2006 | 2,472 | — |
| 2013 | 2,163 | −1.89% |
| 2018 | 2,235 | +0.66% |
| 2023 | 2,061 | −1.61% |
The 2006 population is for a larger area of 0.98 km^{2}. Source:

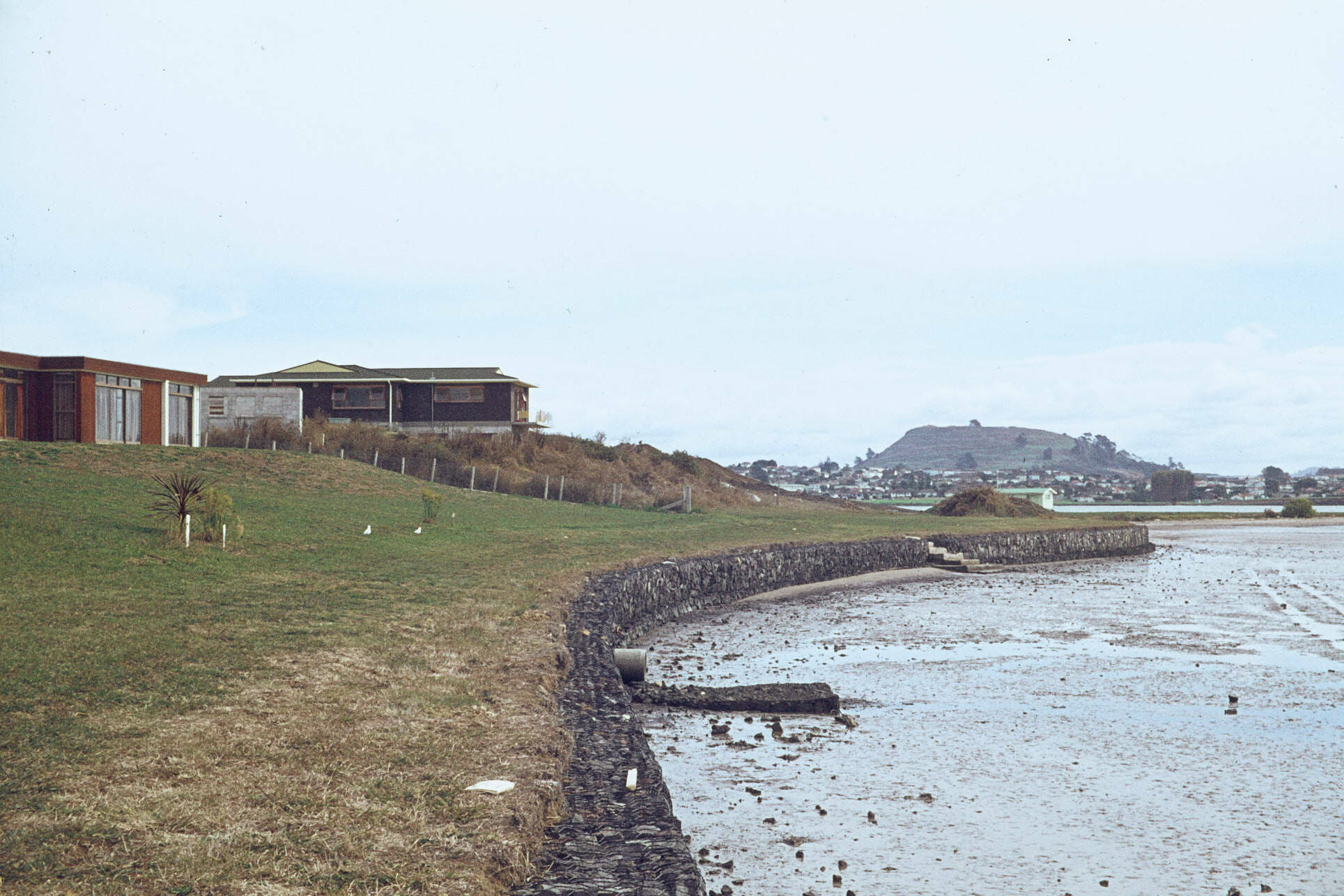
Newly constructed seawall and housing in Farm Cove in 1973

Farm Cove had a population of 2,061 in the 2023 New Zealand census, a decrease of 174 people (−7.8%) since the 2018 census, and a decrease of 102 people (−4.7%) since the 2013 census. There were 1,017 males and 1,041 females in 702 dwellings. 3.1% of people identified as LGBTIQ+. The median age was 43.0 years (compared with 38.1 years nationally). There were 348 people (16.9%) aged under 15 years, 363 (17.6%) aged 15 to 29, 978 (47.5%) aged 30 to 64, and 369 (17.9%) aged 65 or older.

People could identify as more than one ethnicity. The results were 64.5% European (Pākehā); 6.0% Māori; 2.5% Pasifika; 31.9% Asian; 2.0% Middle Eastern, Latin American and African New Zealanders (MELAA); and 4.1% other, which includes people giving their ethnicity as "New Zealander". English was spoken by 93.3%, Māori language by 0.6%, Samoan by 0.1%, and other languages by 32.8%. No language could be spoken by 1.2% (e.g. too young to talk). New Zealand Sign Language was known by 0.1%. The percentage of people born overseas was 40.6, compared with 28.8% nationally.

Religious affiliations were 33.5% Christian, 1.2% Hindu, 1.2% Islam, 0.1% Māori religious beliefs, 1.7% Buddhist, 0.3% New Age, and 2.2% other religions. People who answered that they had no religion were 53.1%, and 6.7% of people did not answer the census question.

Of those at least 15 years old, 651 (38.0%) people had a bachelor's or higher degree, 744 (43.4%) had a post-high school certificate or diploma, and 318 (18.6%) people exclusively held high school qualifications. The median income was $49,900, compared with $41,500 nationally. 336 people (19.6%) earned over $100,000 compared to 12.1% nationally. The employment status of those at least 15 was that 909 (53.1%) people were employed full-time, 270 (15.8%) were part-time, and 30 (1.8%) were unemployed.

== Education ==
Farm Cove Intermediate is an intermediate school (years 7-8) with a roll of 498, and was established in 1980. Wakaaranga School is a contributing primary school (years 1-6) with a roll of 627. The school was opened in 1976, and its name means "The resting place of the canoe". The schools are both coeducational and are on adjacent sites. Rolls are as of July 2025. There is also a small public kindergarten, located behind Wakaaranga Primary School.

== Bibliography ==
- La Roche, Alan (2011). Grey's Folly: A History of Howick, Pakuranga, Bucklands-Eastern Beaches, East Tamaki, Whitford, Beachlands and Maraetai. Auckland: Tui Vale Productions. ISBN 978-0-473-18547-3. OCLC 1135039710. Wikidata Q118286377.
