= Wai o Taiki Bay =

- Suburb
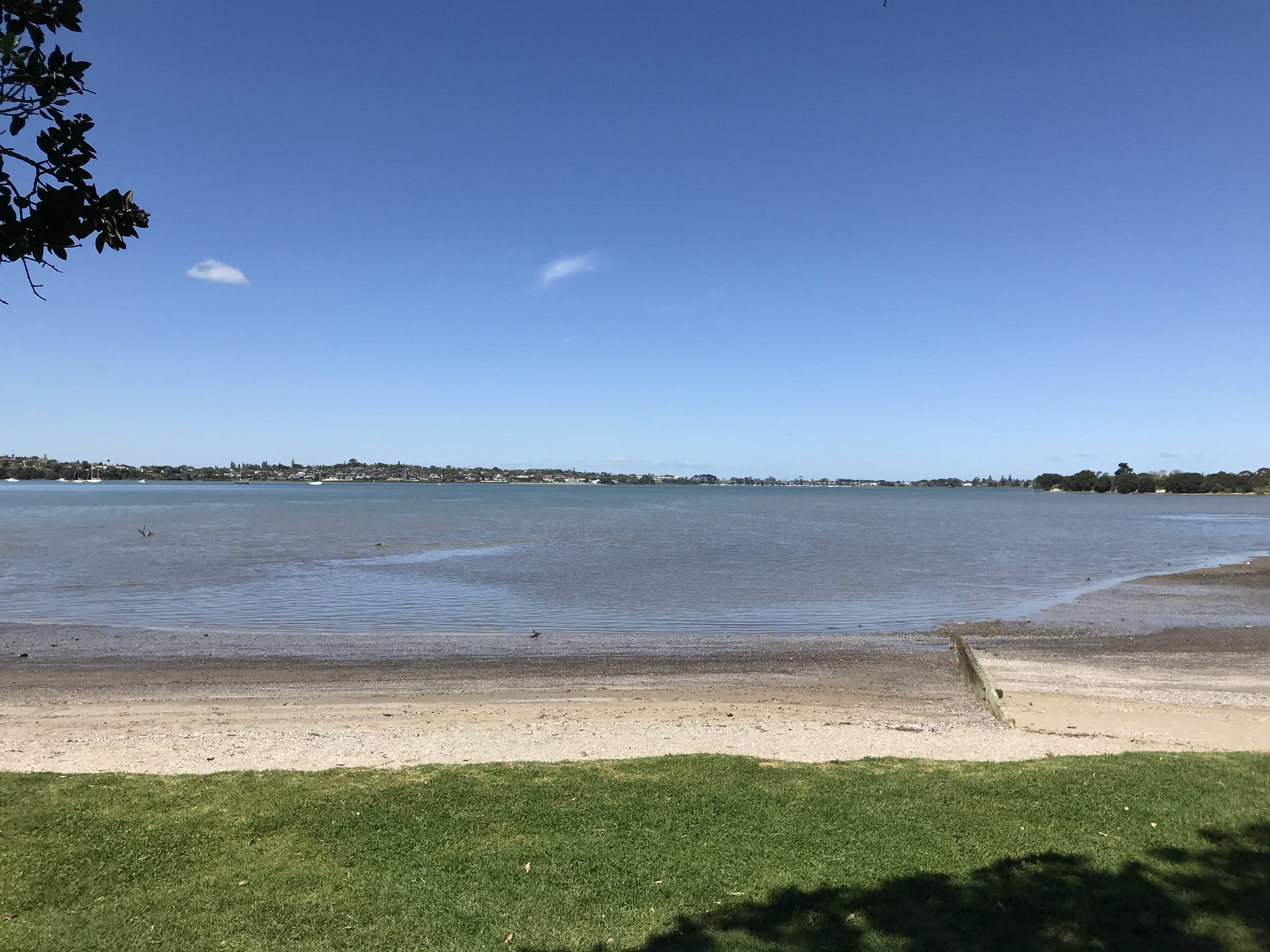
- Wai o Taiki Bay
- Interactive map of Wai o Taiki Bay
- Coordinates: 36°52′18″S 174°52′39″E
- Country: New Zealand
- City: Auckland
- Local authority: Auckland Council
- Electoral ward: Maungakiekie-Tāmaki ward
- Local board: Maungakiekie-Tāmaki Local Board
- Board subdivision: Tamaki

Area
  - Land: 140 ha (350 acres)

Population (June 2025)
  - Total: 5,670
  - Density: 4,100/km^{2} (10,000/sq mi)

Saint Heliers	Glendowie
Glen Innes	Wai o Taiki Bay	Tamaki River
Point England	Farm Cove	Half Moon Bay

Wai o Taiki Bay is a suburb in Auckland, New Zealand. It is under the local governance of Auckland Council.

== Location ==
Bordering Glen Innes, Glendowie and the Tamaki River estuary.

== Demographics ==
The statistical area of Glen Innes East-Wai O Taiki Bay covers 1.40 km^{2} (0.54 sq mi) and had an estimated population of 5,670 as of June 2025, with a population density of 4,050 people per km^{2}.

Historical population
Year	Pop.	±% p.a.
2006	3,855	—
2013	3,537	−1.22%
2018	3,447	−0.51%
2023	4,992	+7.69%

Glen Innes East-Wai O Taiki Bay had a population of 4,992 in the 2023 New Zealand census, an increase of 1,545 people (44.8%) since the 2018 census, and an increase of 1,455 people (41.1%) since the 2013 census. There were 2,418 males, 2,562 females and 15 people of other genders in 1,443 dwellings. 2.5% of people identified as LGBTIQ+. The median age was 31.0 years (compared with 38.1 years nationally). There were 1,254 people (25.1%) aged under 15 years, 1,158 (23.2%) aged 15 to 29, 2,229 (44.7%) aged 30 to 64, and 348 (7.0%) aged 65 or older.

People could identify as more than one ethnicity. The results were 43.3% European (Pākehā); 18.6% Māori; 36.1% Pasifika; 15.6% Asian; 3.8% Middle Eastern, Latin American and African New Zealanders (MELAA); and 1.9% other, which includes people giving their ethnicity as "New Zealander". English was spoken by 91.7%, Māori language by 5.4%, Samoan by 7.0%, and other languages by 25.6%. No language could be spoken by 3.5% (e.g. too young to talk). New Zealand Sign Language was known by 0.4%. The percentage of people born overseas was 35.5, compared with 28.8% nationally.

Religious affiliations were 46.1% Christian, 1.0% Hindu, 3.2% Islam, 2.2% Māori religious beliefs, 2.2% Buddhist, 0.1% New Age, 0.4% Jewish, and 1.1% other religions. People who answered that they had no religion were 37.1%, and 6.8% of people did not answer the census question.

Of those at least 15 years old, 1,113 (29.8%) people had a bachelor's or higher degree, 1,593 (42.6%) had a post-high school certificate or diploma, and 1,032 (27.6%) people exclusively held high school qualifications. The median income was $41,400, compared with $41,500 nationally. 600 people (16.1%) earned over $100,000 compared to 12.1% nationally. The employment status of those at least 15 was that 1,989 (53.2%) people were employed full-time, 429 (11.5%) were part-time, and 183 (4.9%) were unemployed.

== History ==
Its name is based on the original name of the Tāmaki River, Te Wai o Taiki, meaning "The Waters of Taiki". The name Taiki is a shortened form of Taikehu, the name of an ancestor of Ngāi Tai. The suburb contains a mix of state houses and architecturally designed houses constructed by developers.

It was formerly under Auckland City Council from 1989 until the merger of all of Auckland's councils into the 'super city' in 2010.

== Landmarks and features ==
=== Tahuna Torea ===
Tahuna Torea is a 25-hectare, wildlife reserve of mangrove lagoon and swampland sited on a long sandbank extending out into the Tāmaki Estuary. Rich in Māori history as well as home to native birds and vegetation, Tahuna Torea means 'gathering place of the oystercatcher'. There are three main walking trails around the reserve.

=== Wai-O-Taiki Nature Reserve ===
Wai-O-Taiki Nature Reserve is a bushy reserve that runs along the Tāmaki Estuary, with a track connecting it to the larger Tahuna Torea reserve.

== Education ==
Glenbrae Primary School is a coeducational full primary school (years 1–8) with a roll of 166 as of July 2026.
