= Atea College =

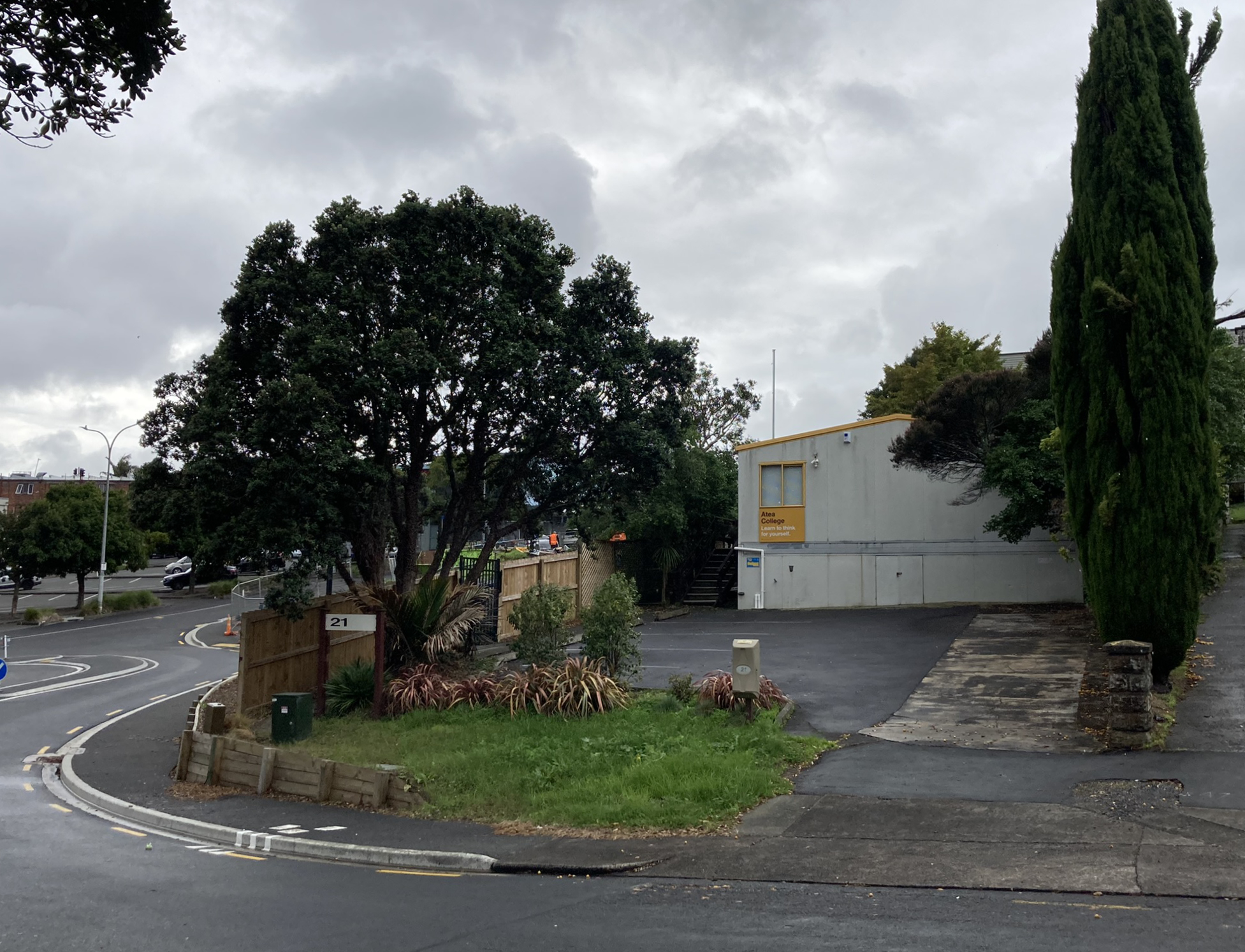
- Atea College in 2022

Location
- 21 Domain Road, Panmure, Auckland, New Zealand; 36.9010°S 174.8546°E

Information
- Type: Composite (Year 1–13)
- Motto: Learn to think for yourself
- Established: 1987
- Ministry of Education Institution no.: 460
- Principal: Mrs Eunice Hall
- Enrolment: 17 (July 2026)
- Socio-economic decile: 8
- Website: careycollege.com

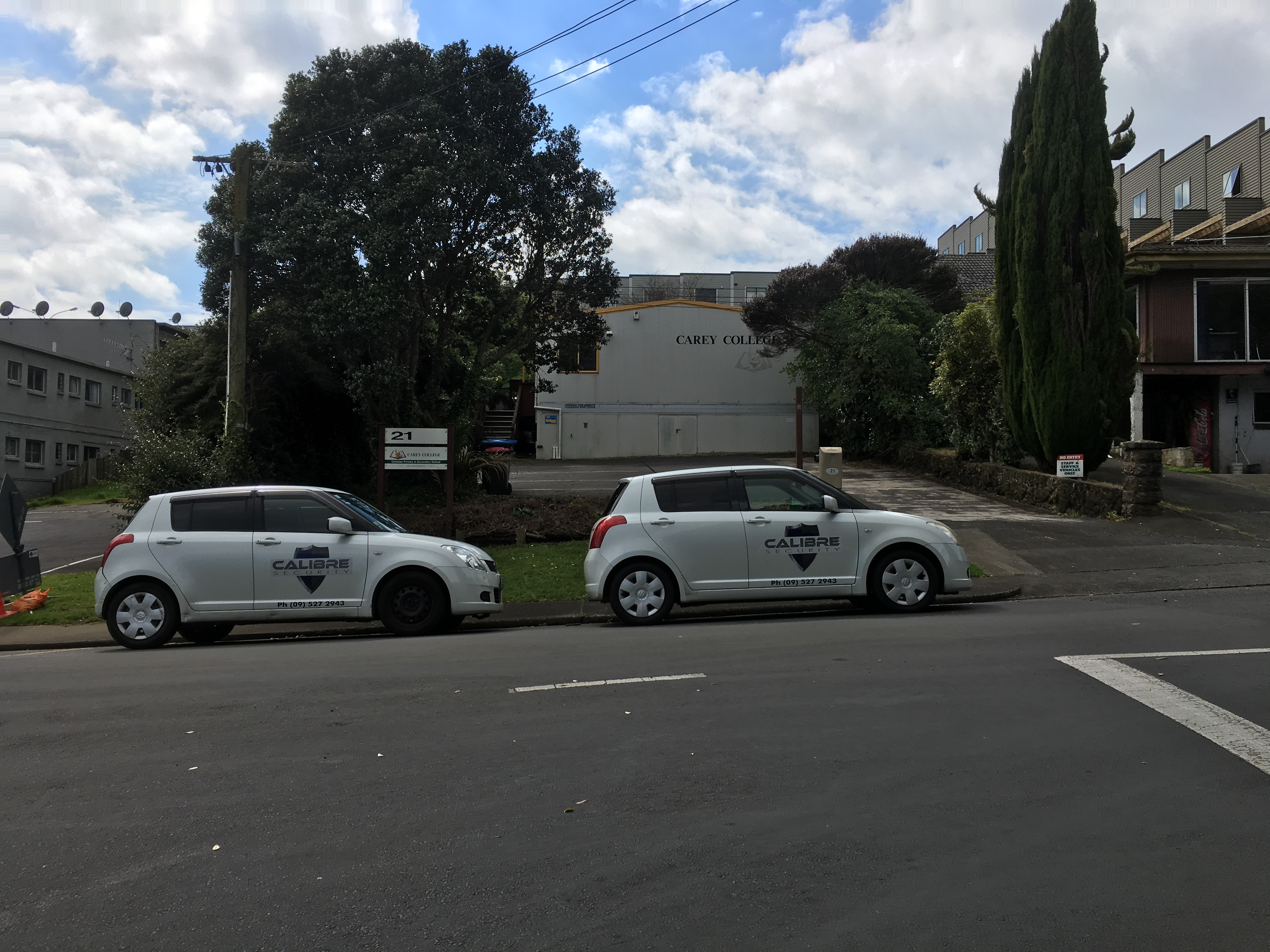
Carey College, September 2018

Atea College, formerly Carey College, is a private Christian school in Panmure, Auckland, New Zealand.

The school's motto is "Learn to think for yourself". Atea College is a registered Cambridge International Centre, preparing students for Cambridge International Examinations IGCSE and A Level qualifications instead of the National Certificate of Educational Achievement ("NCEA"), which it regards as unsatisfactory.

This school's curriculum implements a Bible-based worldview.

The school was renamed Atea College in 2019 or 2020.
