= Overseas Investment Commission =

New Zealand government agency regulating foreign investment

The Overseas Investment Commission was a New Zealand government agency responsible for regulating foreign direct investment into New Zealand.

The commission was administratively part of the Reserve Bank of New Zealand (New Zealand's central bank). This link recognises a historical foreign exchange control role of the commission.

The commission was responsible for high value investments (2005: NZD $50m+), investments in sensitive land and investments in fishing quota.

The commission was replaced by the Overseas Investment Office from 25 August 2005. The Office is part of Land Information New Zealand, the New Zealand Government Agency responsible for survey, land valuation, land titles and mapping. This link recognises that the majority of the Office's work relates to the control of sensitive land.
