= Mount Wellington, New Zealand =

Mount Wellington
- Suburb
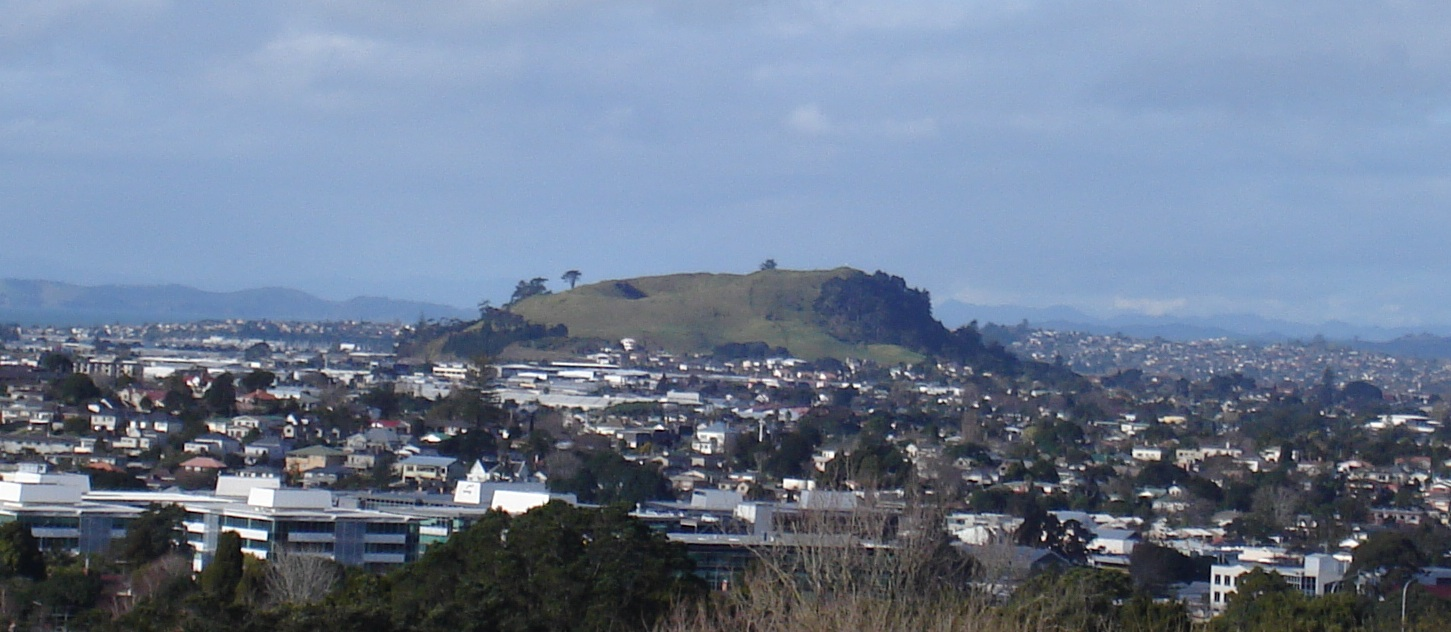
- Interactive map of Mount Wellington
- Coordinates: 36.908°S 174.839°E
- Country: New Zealand
- City: Auckland
- Local authority: Auckland Council
- Electoral ward: Maungakiekie-Tāmaki ward
- Local board: Maungakiekie-Tāmaki Local Board

Area
  - Land: 1,036 ha (2,560 acres)

Population (June 2025)
  - Total: 29,990
  - Density: 2,895/km^{2} (7,497/sq mi)
- Train stations: Sylvia Park Railway Station

| | Ellerslie, St. John's Park, Panmure |
| Penrose | Mount Wellington | (Tāmaki River), Pakuranga, Panmure |
| | Westfield | Panmure |

Mount Wellington is a suburb in East Auckland, New Zealand, located 10 km (6.2 mi) southeast of the city centre. It is surrounded by the suburbs of Stonefields, Tamaki, Panmure, Penrose, and Ellerslie, and by the Tāmaki River. The suburb is named after the volcanic peak of Maungarei / Mount Wellington. Sylvia Park is a large business park and shopping centre located in the suburb.

== Geography ==
Maungarei / Mount Wellington is a 135.3 m (444 ft) volcanic peak of the Auckland volcanic field. It is the youngest onshore volcano of the Auckland volcanic field, having been formed by an eruption around 10,000 years ago. It is the largest of Auckland's scoria cones. Prior to European settlement, the area around Maungarei was bracken scrub and not densely forested. The southern section, closer to Ōtāhuhu / Mount Richmond, was primarily broadleaf and podocarp forest with patches of clear scrubland.

== History ==
The isthmus south of the mountain was traditionally settled by Ngāi Tāhuhu, descendants of Tāhuhunui-o-te-rangi, captain of the Moekākara waka and namesake of Ōtāhuhu. Four archaeological sites near Carbine Road/Panama Road near the Tāmaki River were occupied in the mid to late 1500s. A large number of storage pits for root vegetables (such as kūmara) were found at the sites, suggesting the area was extensively gardened by Māori, as well as an area where toki (adze) were created. South of Mutukaroa / Hamlins Hill was Karetu, a 2 km portage between the Waitematā Harbour/Tāmaki River and the Manukau Harbour. Mount Wellington had historically supplied most of Auckland's vegetables alongside Tāmaki until the 1940s when that land was turned into an industrial estate. Mount Wellington Borough was formed in 1952 from the earlier Mount Wellington Road District (formed 1865 from the earlier Panmure Road District), three years later it annexed the Panmure Township Road District.

== Demographics ==
Mount Wellington covers 10.36 km^{2} (4.00 sq mi) and had an estimated population of 29,990 as of June 2025, with a population density of 2,895 people per km^{2}.

While most of the suburb is residential, Sylvia Park is almost entirely commercial, and the central area of Mount Wellington Industrial is almost entirely industrial.

Historical population
| Year | Pop. | ±% p.a. |
|---|---|---|
| 2006 | 21,162 | — |
| 2013 | 23,295 | +1.38% |
| 2018 | 25,233 | +1.61% |
| 2023 | 26,280 | +0.82% |

Mount Wellington had a population of 26,280 in the 2023 New Zealand census, an increase of 1,047 people (4.1%) since the 2018 census, and an increase of 2,985 people (12.8%) since the 2013 census. There were 13,215 males, 12,966 females and 99 people of other genders in 8,553 dwellings. 3.8% of people identified as LGBTIQ+. The median age was 34.0 years (compared with 38.1 years nationally). There were 4,785 people (18.2%) aged under 15 years, 6,012 (22.9%) aged 15 to 29, 12,321 (46.9%) aged 30 to 64, and 3,165 (12.0%) aged 65 or older.

People could identify as more than one ethnicity. The results were 35.5% European (Pākehā); 12.8% Māori; 24.3% Pasifika; 38.7% Asian; 2.6% Middle Eastern, Latin American and African New Zealanders (MELAA); and 1.4% other, which includes people giving their ethnicity as "New Zealander". English was spoken by 90.8%, Māori language by 2.4%, Samoan by 4.7%, and other languages by 34.5%. No language could be spoken by 2.9% (e.g. too young to talk). New Zealand Sign Language was known by 0.4%. The percentage of people born overseas was 48.1, compared with 28.8% nationally.

Religious affiliations were 42.1% Christian, 7.1% Hindu, 2.9% Islam, 1.0% Māori religious beliefs, 3.4% Buddhist, 0.3% New Age, 0.2% Jewish, and 2.1% other religions. People who answered that they had no religion were 35.4%, and 5.8% of people did not answer the census question.

Of those at least 15 years old, 6,441 (30.0%) people had a bachelor's or higher degree, 8,643 (40.2%) had a post-high school certificate or diploma, and 6,405 (29.8%) people exclusively held high school qualifications. The median income was $45,800, compared with $41,500 nationally. 2,259 people (10.5%) earned over $100,000 compared to 12.1% nationally. The employment status of those at least 15 was that 12,264 (57.1%) people were employed full-time, 2,034 (9.5%) were part-time, and 696 (3.2%) were unemployed.

Individual statistical areas
| Name | Area (km^{2}) | Population | Density (per km^{2}) | Dwellings | Median age | Median income |
|---|---|---|---|---|---|---|
| Mount Wellington North West | 0.92 | 2,970 | 3,228 | 1,233 | 42.8 years | $42,900 |
| Mount Wellington North East | 0.73 | 2,097 | 2,873 | 759 | 34.4 years | $54,100 |
| Mount Wellington Ferndale | 0.65 | 3,150 | 4,846 | 1,092 | 33.6 years | $50,000 |
| Mount Wellington East | 0.69 | 3,111 | 4,509 | 984 | 32.9 years | $44,800 |
| Mount Wellington West | 0.78 | 3,318 | 4,254 | 1,005 | 32.6 years | $46,500 |
| Mount Wellington Hamlin | 0.57 | 2,643 | 4,637 | 801 | 34.5 years | $45,800 |
| Mount Wellington Central | 0.75 | 2,703 | 3,604 | 858 | 35.8 years | $45,500 |
| Sylvia Park | 0.56 | 117 | 209 | 45 | 33.1 years | $41,100 |
| Mount Wellington Industrial | 3.33 | 9 | 3 | 6 | 66.3 years | $37,300 |
| Mount Wellington South West | 0.70 | 3,033 | 4,333 | 915 | 31.8 years | $50,800 |
| Mount Wellington South East | 0.67 | 3,129 | 4,667 | 858 | 30.7 years | $34,900 |
| New Zealand | | | | | 38.1 years | $41,500 |

== Economy ==
=== Retail ===
The Sylvia Park shopping centre opened in 2006, and an upgrade opened in 2020. The mall has 106,427 m^{2} of lettable space spread across two floors, alongside 4,053 carparks. Its 250 stores include anchor tenants The Warehouse, Farmers, Kmart, Pak'nSave and a 10-screen Hoyts Cinema.

Mt Wellington Shopping Centre has 22 stores spread across 9,000 m^{2}, including anchor tenants Countdown and Supercheap Auto.

== Education ==
Bailey Road School, Stanhope Road School and Sylvia Park School are state full primary schools (years 1–8) with rolls of 302, 574 and 581 students, respectively.

Panama Road School is a contributing primary school (years 1–6) with a roll of 344 students.

All these school are coeducational. Rolls are as of July 2026.
