= Stonefields =

- Suburb
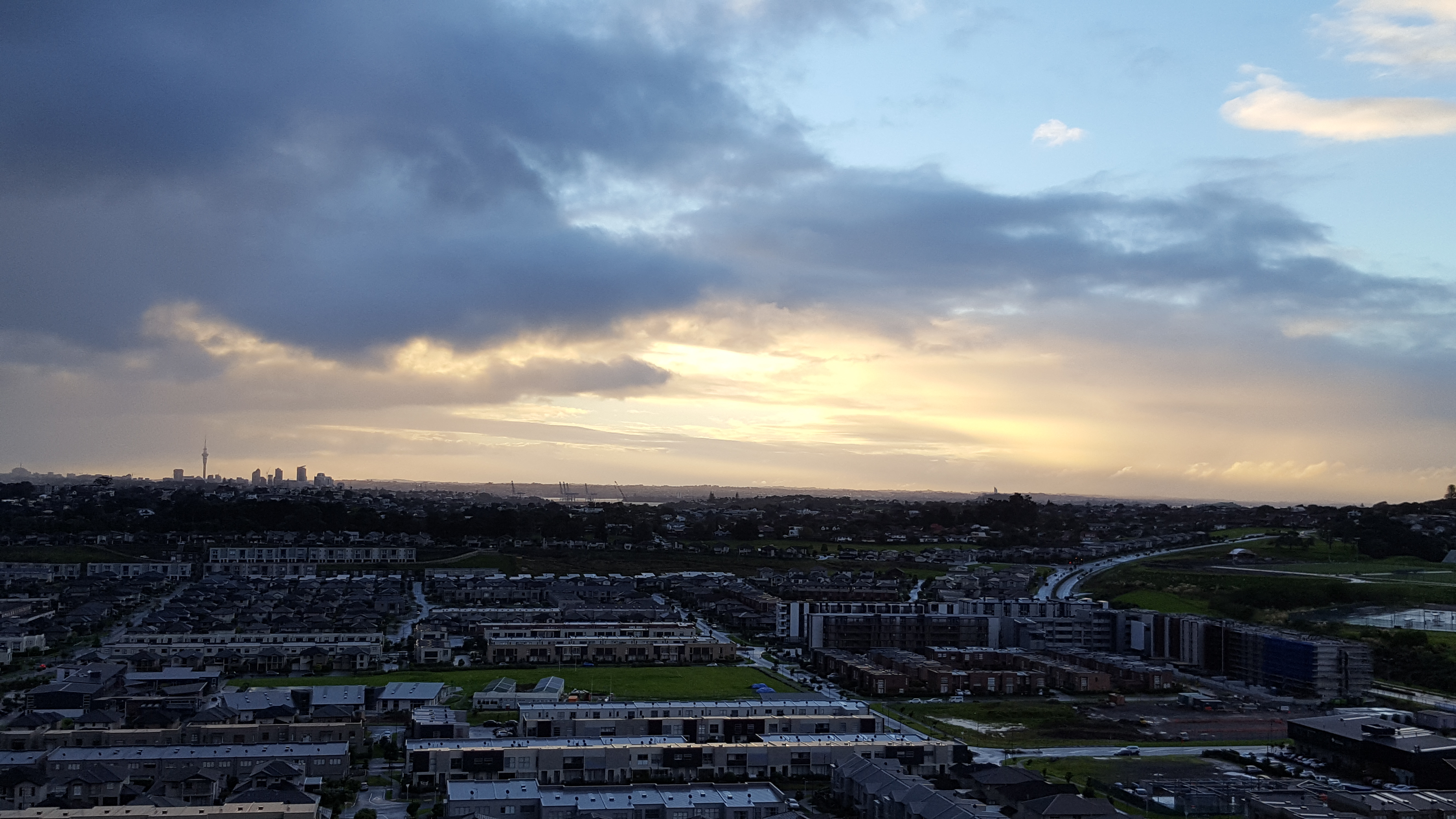
- A sunset view of Stonefields from Maungarei
- Interactive map of Stonefields
- Coordinates: 36°53′15″S 174°50′25″E
- Country: New Zealand
- City: Auckland
- Local authority: Auckland Council
- Electoral ward: Ōrākei ward
- Local board: Ōrākei Local Board

Area
  - Land: 99 ha (240 acres)

Population (June 2025)
  - Total: 4,250
  - Density: 4,300/km^{2} (11,000/sq mi)
- Postcode: 1072

Meadowbank (3.5 km)	St Johns (3.3 km)	Glen Innes (2.7 km)
Greenlane (5.9 km)	Stonefields	Tamaki (3.3 km)
Ellerslie (4.6 km)	Mt Wellington (4.6 km)	Panmure (3.5 km)

Stonefields is a suburb in Auckland, New Zealand, located 8 kilometres southeast of the city centre. Stonefields is surrounded by the suburbs of Mount Wellington, Saint Johns and Glen Innes.

== History ==
The 100 hectares site of single basalt lava flow from the nearby scoria cone of Maungarei/ Mt Wellington was purchased by Percy Winstone in the mid-1930s. Quarrying began in 1936 and by 1969, the quarry reached a production total of 1 million tonnes per year. When the quarry was worked out by the year 2000, in excess of 35 million tonnes had been produced and used to build the city of Auckland. Once the quarry ceased operations, there was much debate on its future use. A landfill rubbish site was considered and the plan was discarded due to the risk of leachate into ground water. Instead, Stonefields, a housing development was agreed.

The former rock quarry was to be one of the largest blocks of undeveloped land in Auckland, able to take a $1.5 billion housing subdivision for about 8000 people in up to 1000 apartments, 1000 stand-alone houses and 1000 terraced houses. In 2002 New Zealand's Overseas Investment Commission approved the purchase of land surrounding the Mt Wellington quarry by Fletcher Residential. Approval was required as the parent company, Fletcher Building, was more than 25 per cent foreign owned.

== Demographics ==
Stonefields covers 0.99 km^{2} (0.38 sq mi) and had an estimated population of 4,250 as of June 2025, with a population density of 4,293 people per km^{2}.

Historical population
Year	Pop.	±% p.a.
2006	0	—
2013	2,040	—
2018	3,792	+13.20%
2023	3,945	+0.79%

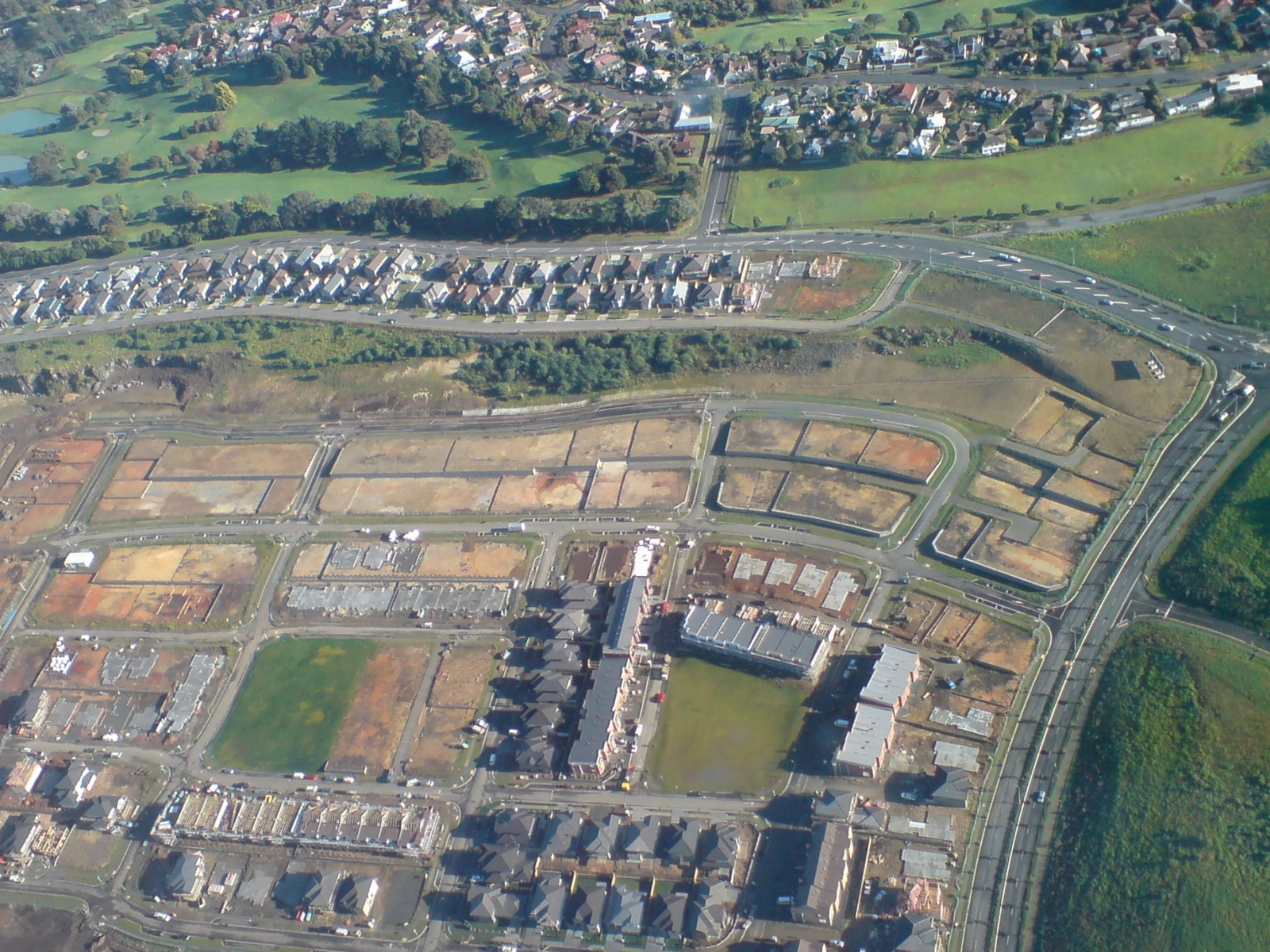
Stonefields being developed in 2008

Stonefields had a population of 3,945 in the 2023 New Zealand census, an increase of 153 people (4.0%) since the 2018 census, and an increase of 1,905 people (93.4%) since the 2013 census. There were 1,854 males, 2,085 females and 6 people of other genders in 1,488 dwellings. 3.3% of people identified as LGBTIQ+. The median age was 40.0 years (compared with 38.1 years nationally). There were 768 people (19.5%) aged under 15 years, 618 (15.7%) aged 15 to 29, 1,950 (49.4%) aged 30 to 64, and 609 (15.4%) aged 65 or older.

People could identify as more than one ethnicity. The results were 57.9% European (Pākehā); 4.3% Māori; 2.4% Pasifika; 39.0% Asian; 3.6% Middle Eastern, Latin American and African New Zealanders (MELAA); and 1.9% other, which includes people giving their ethnicity as "New Zealander". English was spoken by 94.4%, Māori language by 0.8%, Samoan by 0.6%, and other languages by 33.5%. No language could be spoken by 2.1% (e.g. too young to talk). New Zealand Sign Language was known by 0.4%. The percentage of people born overseas was 45.9, compared with 28.8% nationally.

Religious affiliations were 32.4% Christian, 4.4% Hindu, 2.5% Islam, 0.1% Māori religious beliefs, 3.1% Buddhist, 0.2% New Age, 0.7% Jewish, and 1.7% other religions. People who answered that they had no religion were 49.9%, and 5.1% of people did not answer the census question.

Of those at least 15 years old, 1,674 (52.7%) people had a bachelor's or higher degree, 1,047 (33.0%) had a post-high school certificate or diploma, and 456 (14.4%) people exclusively held high school qualifications. The median income was $66,200, compared with $41,500 nationally. 1,002 people (31.5%) earned over $100,000 compared to 12.1% nationally. The employment status of those at least 15 was that 1,899 (59.8%) people were employed full-time, 372 (11.7%) were part-time, and 54 (1.7%) were unemployed.

Individual statistical areas
Name	Area (km^{2})	Population	Density (per km^{2})	Dwellings	Median age	Median income
Stonefields West	0.54	2,088	3,867	762	40.2 years	$67,500
Stonefields East	0.45	1,857	4,127	729	39.8 years	$65,000
New Zealand					38.1 years	$41,500

== Education ==
Stonefields School is a coeducational full primary (years 0–8) school with a roll of 646 as of July 2026.
