= Tāmaki =

- Suburb
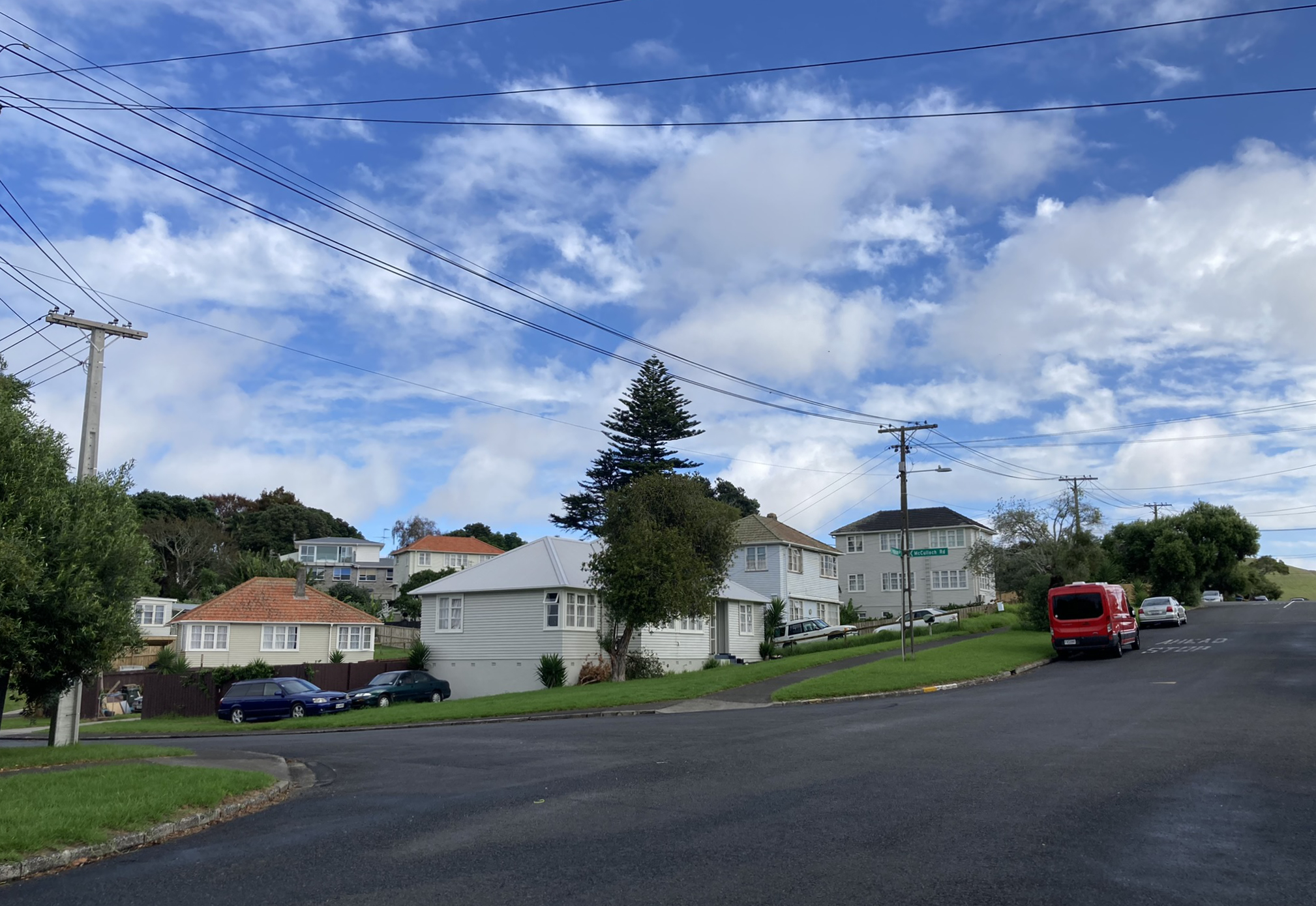
- A view of typical houses in Tāmaki
- Interactive map of Tāmaki
- Coordinates: 36°53′27″S 174°51′24″E
- Country: New Zealand
- City: Auckland
- Local authority: Auckland Council
- Electoral ward: Maungakiekie-Tāmaki ward
- Local board: Maungakiekie-Tāmaki Local Board
- Board subdivision: Tāmaki

Area
  - Land: 129 ha (320 acres)

Population (June 2025)
  - Total: 4,580
  - Density: 3,550/km^{2} (9,200/sq mi)

St Johns	Point England
Stonefields	Tāmaki	(Tāmaki River)
Mount Wellington	Panmure

Tāmaki is a small suburb of East Auckland, 11 kilometres from the Auckland CBD, in the North Island of New Zealand. It is located by the banks of the estuarial Tāmaki River, which is a southern arm of the Hauraki Gulf. The suburb is between the suburbs of Point England to the north and Panmure to the south.

Tāmaki is under the local governance of Auckland Council. It is part of the much larger Tāmaki parliamentary electorate.

== Demographics ==
Tāmaki covers 1.29 km^{2} (0.50 sq mi) and had an estimated population of 4,580 as of June 2025, with a population density of 3,523 people per km^{2}.

Historical population
Year	Pop.	±% p.a.
2006	3,933	—
2013	3,954	+0.08%
2018	4,275	+1.57%
2023	4,167	−0.51%

Tāmaki had a population of 4,167 in the 2023 New Zealand census, a decrease of 108 people (−2.5%) since the 2018 census, and an increase of 213 people (5.4%) since the 2013 census. There were 2,073 males, 2,085 females and 12 people of other genders in 1,272 dwellings. 3.4% of people identified as LGBTIQ+. There were 924 people (22.2%) aged under 15 years, 936 (22.5%) aged 15 to 29, 1,887 (45.3%) aged 30 to 64, and 423 (10.2%) aged 65 or older.

People could identify as more than one ethnicity. The results were 30.8% European (Pākehā); 22.5% Māori; 40.1% Pasifika; 23.3% Asian; 2.2% Middle Eastern, Latin American and African New Zealanders (MELAA); and 1.5% other, which includes people giving their ethnicity as "New Zealander". English was spoken by 90.5%, Māori language by 4.5%, Samoan by 7.3%, and other languages by 28.3%. No language could be spoken by 3.0% (e.g. too young to talk). New Zealand Sign Language was known by 0.4%. The percentage of people born overseas was 39.2, compared with 28.8% nationally.

Religious affiliations were 46.1% Christian, 2.3% Hindu, 3.0% Islam, 3.1% Māori religious beliefs, 2.0% Buddhist, 0.4% New Age, and 1.7% other religions. People who answered that they had no religion were 34.3%, and 7.7% of people did not answer the census question.

Of those at least 15 years old, 753 (23.2%) people had a bachelor's or higher degree, 1,350 (41.6%) had a post-high school certificate or diploma, and 1,158 (35.7%) people exclusively held high school qualifications. 264 people (8.1%) earned over $100,000 compared to 12.1% nationally. The employment status of those at least 15 was that 1,620 (50.0%) people were employed full-time, 318 (9.8%) were part-time, and 156 (4.8%) were unemployed.

Individual statistical areas
Name	Area (km^{2})	Population	Density (per km^{2})	Dwellings	Median age	Median income
Tamaki West	0.63	2,592	4,114	789	32.8 years	$36,000
Tamaki East	0.66	1,575	2,386	483	32.5 years	$38,100
New Zealand					38.1 years	$41,500

== Education ==
Tāmaki Primary School is a contributing primary school (years 1–8) with a roll of 177. Sommerville School is a school for students with special educational needs with a roll of 399. These schools are adjacent to each other. Both schools are coeducational. Rolls are as of July 2026.

== Volcano ==
To the west of the suburb is Mount Wellington, a 137-metre volcanic peak which is part of the Auckland volcanic field, and which was formed by an eruption around 9,000 years ago.
