= Glen Innes, New Zealand =

Glen Innes
- Suburb
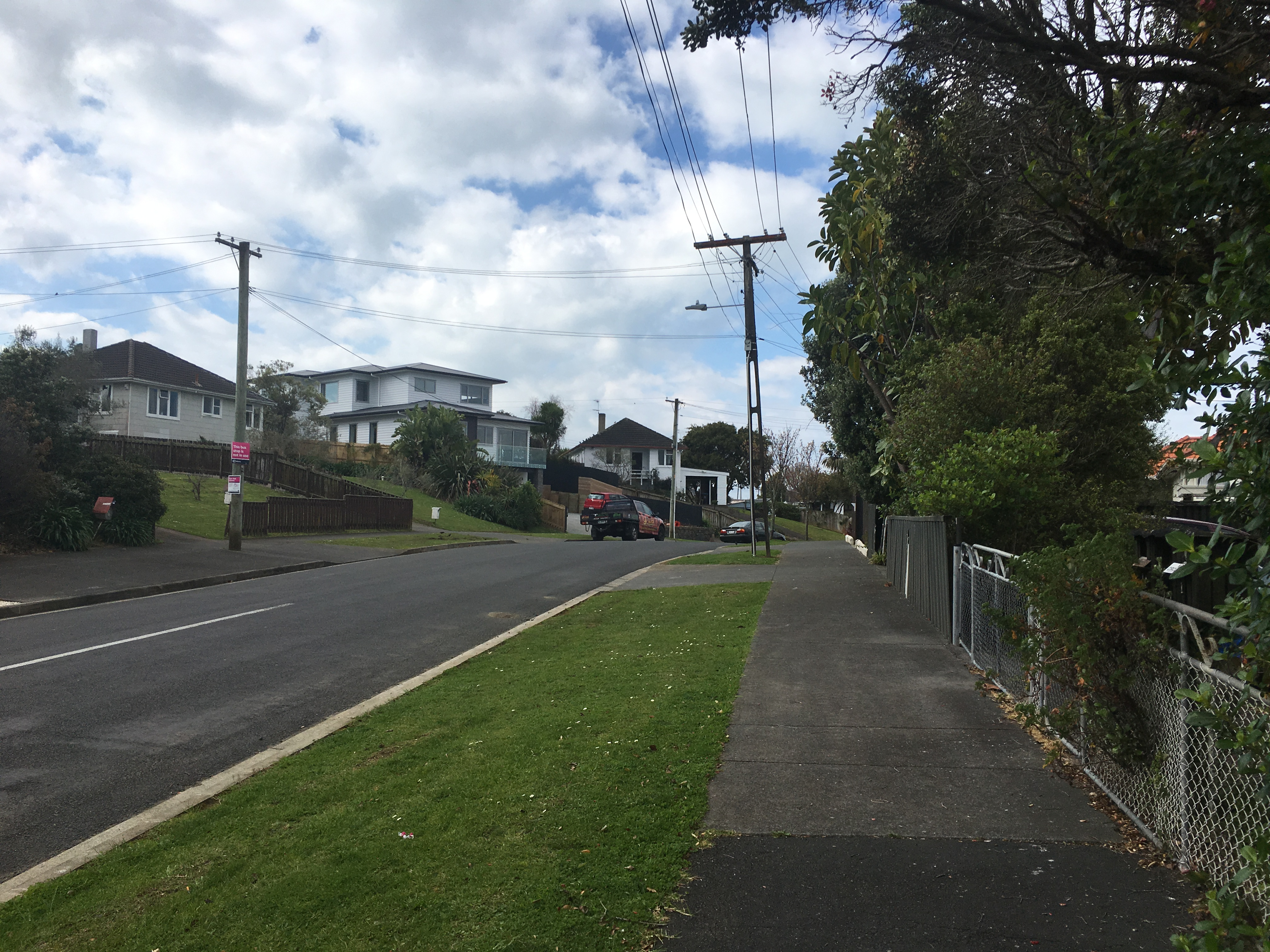
- Glen Innes, September 2018
- Interactive map of Glen Innes
- Coordinates: 36°52′34″S 174°51′41″E
- Country: New Zealand
- City: Auckland
- Local authority: Auckland Council
- Electoral ward: Maungakiekie-Tāmaki ward
- Local board: Maungakiekie-Tāmaki Local Board
- Board subdivision: Tāmaki

Area
  - Land: 276 ha (680 acres)

Population (June 2025)
  - Total: 10,430
  - Density: 3,780/km^{2} (9,790/sq mi)
- Train stations: Glen Innes Railway Station

Kohimarama	Saint Heliers	Glendowie
Saint Johns	Glen Innes	Wai o Taiki Bay
	Point England	Tāmaki River

Glen Innes is a suburb in East Auckland, New Zealand, located nine kilometres to the east of the city centre, close to the waters of the Tāmaki River estuary.

Glen Innes was named after a large farm owned by William Innes Taylor in the area. There were four Taylor brothers in Auckland, the sons of a British man who had had a military career in India. Three of the brothers had farms in this area and built houses; William Innes Taylor at Glen Innes, Richard James Taylor at Glendowie and Charles John Taylor at Glen Orchard (now Saint Heliers). Their brother Allan Kerr Taylor had a farm estate in Mount Albert, whose house was called Alberton.

Glen Innes is a low-income, working class area with around 1,500 state houses. In an effort to improve the quality of state housing in Glen Innes, the government introduced "Talbot Park", an area of higher density housing, consisting of mostly apartment-style housing.

== European settlement ==
The first government sale of land in Tamaki was on 1 February 1842. Allotments were bought for farming by Charles Whybrow Lidgar, John Armitage Buttery, and Patrick Anderson. William Innes Taylor arrived in Auckland in November 1843 made his first purchase of land shortly after. Taylor named the farm the Glen Innes estate. He gradually added to his land holdings and by 1862, Taylor owned around 751 acres. The site Taylor chose for his homestead is now occupied by the Glen Taylor School on West Tamaki Road. Although the homestead is no longer in existence, a Morton Bay fig tree thought to have been planted by Taylor still stands at the entrance of the school. William Innes Taylor died on 7 March 1890. By 1913, 400 acres of the Glen Innes estate had been sold. The land was described as peerless seaside sections.

== Demographics ==
Glen Innes covers 2.76 km^{2} (1.07 sq mi) and had an estimated population of 10,430 as of June 2025, with a population density of 3,779 people per km^{2}.

Historical population
Year	Pop.	±% p.a.
2006	7,674	—
2013	7,140	−1.03%
2018	7,860	+1.94%
2023	9,273	+3.36%

Glen Innes-Wai O Taiki Bay had a population of 9,273 in the 2023 New Zealand census, an increase of 1,413 people (18.0%) since the 2018 census, and an increase of 2,133 people (29.9%) since the 2013 census. There were 4,485 males, 4,764 females and 24 people of other genders in 2,715 dwellings. 2.7% of people identified as LGBTIQ+. The median age was 31.5 years (compared with 38.1 years nationally). There were 2,232 people (24.1%) aged under 15 years, 2,181 (23.5%) aged 15 to 29, 4,149 (44.7%) aged 30 to 64, and 711 (7.7%) aged 65 or older.

People could identify as more than one ethnicity. The results were 42.2% European (Pākehā); 18.5% Māori; 36.8% Pasifika; 16.1% Asian; 3.6% Middle Eastern, Latin American and African New Zealanders (MELAA); and 1.7% other, which includes people giving their ethnicity as "New Zealander". English was spoken by 92.0%, Māori language by 4.9%, Samoan by 6.7%, and other languages by 25.5%. No language could be spoken by 3.1% (e.g. too young to talk). New Zealand Sign Language was known by 0.3%. The percentage of people born overseas was 36.0, compared with 28.8% nationally.

Religious affiliations were 46.3% Christian, 1.4% Hindu, 3.1% Islam, 1.7% Māori religious beliefs, 2.2% Buddhist, 0.2% New Age, 0.4% Jewish, and 1.0% other religions. People who answered that they had no religion were 37.4%, and 6.4% of people did not answer the census question.

Of those at least 15 years old, 2,040 (29.0%) people had a bachelor's or higher degree, 3,060 (43.5%) had a post-high school certificate or diploma, and 1,947 (27.7%) people exclusively held high school qualifications. The median income was $41,500, compared with $41,500 nationally. 1,053 people (15.0%) earned over $100,000 compared to 12.1% nationally. The employment status of those at least 15 was that 3,795 (53.9%) people were employed full-time, 789 (11.2%) were part-time, and 327 (4.6%) were unemployed.

Individual statistical areas
Name	Area (km^{2})	Population	Density (per km^{2})	Dwellings	Median age	Median income
Glen Innes West	1.37	4,284	3,127	1,272	31.9 years	$41,700
Glen Innes East-Wai O Taiki Bay	1.40	4,992	3,566	1,443	31.0 years	$41,400
New Zealand					38.1 years	$41,500

== Education ==
Tāmaki College is a secondary school (years 9–13) with a roll of 720.

Glen Innes School is a full primary school (years 1–8) with a roll of 126.

St Pius X Catholic School is a state-integrated full primary school with a roll of 122.

Sacred Heart College is a state-integrated Catholic boys' school (years 7–13) with a roll of 1,511.

Te Kura Kaupapa Māori o Pūau Te Moananui-ā-Kiwa is a composite school (years 1–13) with a roll of 87. It teaches primarily in the Māori language.

All these schools are coeducational. Rolls are as of July 2026.

== Te Ara Rama Matariki Light Trail ==
Since 2013, the annual Te Ara Rama Matariki Light Trail has been hosted in Glen Innes in celebration of Matariki, the Māori new year. It is an outdoor public lighting festival that runs throughout Maybury Reserve, and typically takes place over nine nights, representing the nine stars of Matariki. On the final night, a large fireworks display takes place.

== Redevelopment conflict ==
There have been protests in Glen Innes over proposals to redevelop existing state-owned housing. Housing New Zealand plans to replace houses on large sections with more "intensive development". This involves removing tenants from properties some have lived in for long periods. Many protests have resulted in arrests of demonstrators, including Mana Party MP Hone Harawira on one occasion, as well as a number of reported police brutality cases. Housing New Zealand argues that the development will "make better use of land" and enable the provision of higher quality homes to their tenants, however community members argue it is a gentrification process which is tearing apart their community.

== Notable people ==
- Dave Dobbyn
- George Moala
- Emily Karaka
- Kiri Nathan

== Panmure-Glen Innes industrial area ==
The area to the southwest of Glen Innes is primarily industrial.

The statistical area called Panmure Glen Innes Industrial covers 2.01 km^{2} (0.78 sq mi) and had an estimated population of 300 as of June 2025, with a population density of 149 people per km^{2}.

Historical population
Year	Pop.	±% p.a.
2006	153	—
2013	252	+7.39%
2018	321	+4.96%
2023	264	−3.83%

Panmure Glen Innes Industrial had a population of 264 in the 2023 New Zealand census, a decrease of 57 people (−17.8%) since the 2018 census, and an increase of 12 people (4.8%) since the 2013 census. There were 162 males and 102 females in 63 dwellings. 4.5% of people identified as LGBTIQ+. The median age was 38.6 years (compared with 38.1 years nationally). There were 36 people (13.6%) aged under 15 years, 39 (14.8%) aged 15 to 29, 159 (60.2%) aged 30 to 64, and 27 (10.2%) aged 65 or older.

People could identify as more than one ethnicity. The results were 33.0% European (Pākehā); 26.1% Māori; 19.3% Pasifika; 33.0% Asian; and 4.5% Middle Eastern, Latin American and African New Zealanders (MELAA). English was spoken by 87.5%, Māori language by 9.1%, and other languages by 36.4%. The percentage of people born overseas was 47.7, compared with 28.8% nationally.

Religious affiliations were 34.1% Christian, 9.1% Hindu, 4.5% Islam, 3.4% Māori religious beliefs, 3.4% Buddhist, and 3.4% other religions. People who answered that they had no religion were 38.6%, and 3.4% of people did not answer the census question.

Of those at least 15 years old, 51 (22.4%) people had a bachelor's or higher degree, 108 (47.4%) had a post-high school certificate or diploma, and 75 (32.9%) people exclusively held high school qualifications. The median income was $35,000, compared with $41,500 nationally. 15 people (6.6%) earned over $100,000 compared to 12.1% nationally. The employment status of those at least 15 was that 114 (50.0%) people were employed full-time, 18 (7.9%) were part-time, and 15 (6.6%) were unemployed.
