= Maungarei =

Scoria cone in Auckland, New Zealand

Maungarei / Mt Wellington
- Mount Wellington
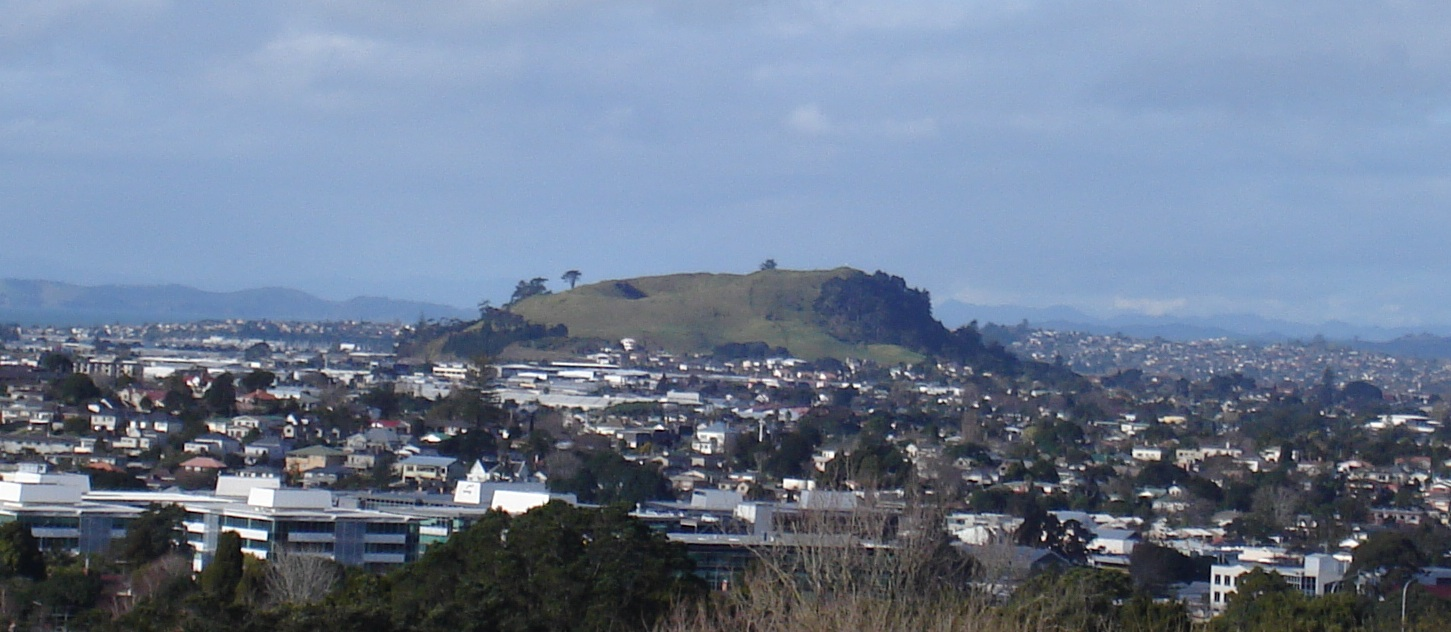
- Maungarei / Mount Wellington

Highest point
- Elevation: 135 m (443 ft)
- Coordinates: 36°53′35″S 174°50′47.6″E

Geography
- Location: Auckland, North Island, New Zealand

Geology
- Rock age: 10,000 years
- Volcanic field: Auckland volcanic field

Maungarei / Mount Wellington is a 135-metre volcanic peak and Tūpuna Maunga (ancestral mountain) located in the Auckland volcanic field of Auckland, New Zealand. It is the youngest onshore volcano of the Auckland volcanic field, having been formed by an eruption around 10,000 years ago. It is the largest of Auckland's scoria cones and has a near-circular base with a flattish rim and three small craters. It is situated in the Mount Wellington suburb of Central Auckland.

== Geology ==
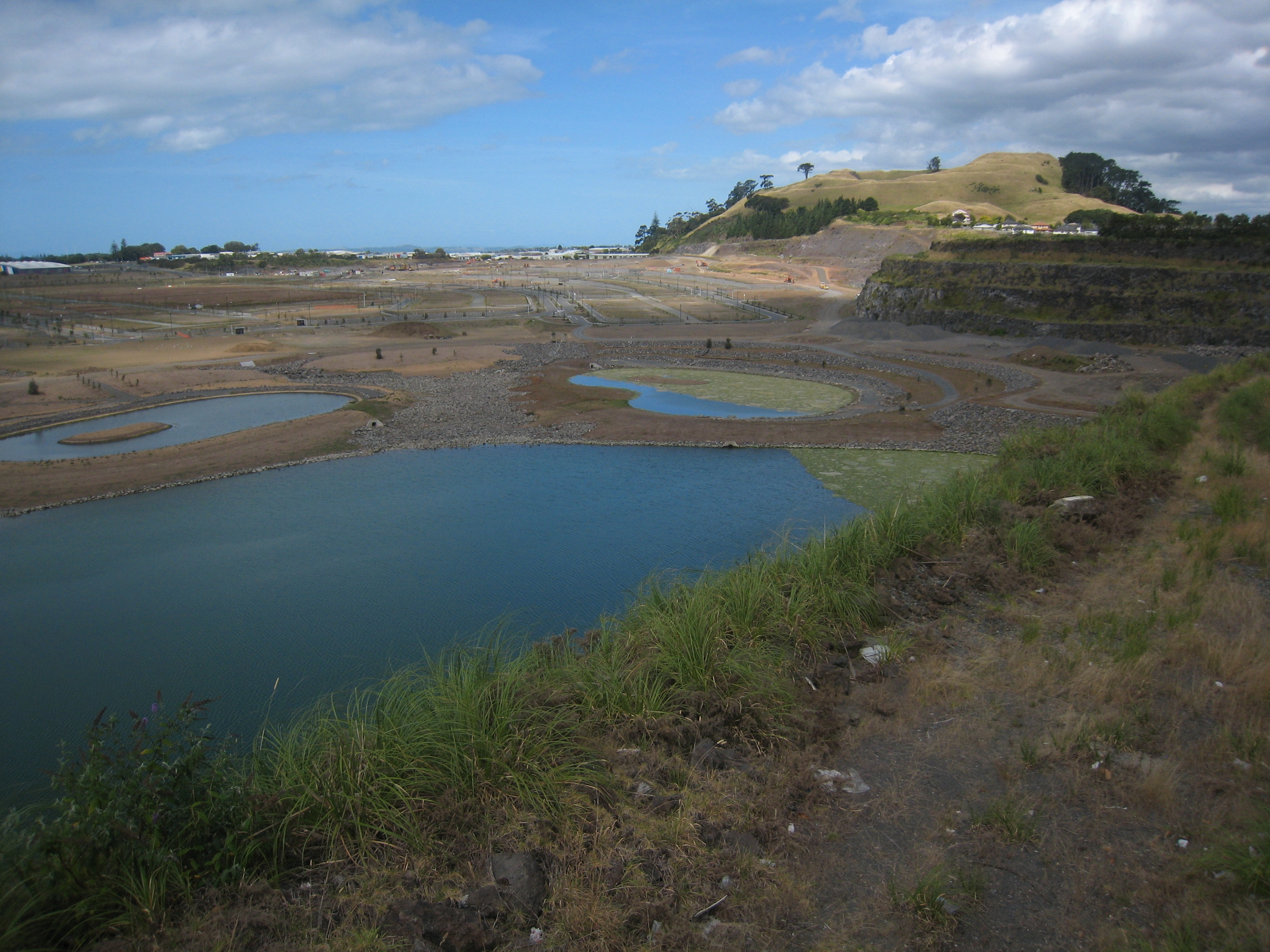
Maungarei rises beyond the Stonefields redeveloped quarry to its north

A number of lava flows were created by the mountain's eruption, including one which was six kilometres in length, stretching to the Manukau Harbour at Southdown. Another lava flow blocked the course of a river valley, forming Lake Waiatarua.

== History ==
The name Maungarei is short for Te Maungarei ā Pōtaka, the ancient Ngāi Tai ki Tāmaki / Te Waiōhua chief whose domain included the mountain and surrounding areas. Maungarei is also translated as "the watchful mountain" or "the mountain of Reipae". Reipae is a Tainui ancestress who travelled to Northland in the form of a bird. Maungarei was used as a pā, and its flanks, particularly on the eastern side, are covered in food storage pits and terraced house sites. The pā was occupied from at least 1400AD onwards.

Mount Wellington was named by surveyor Felton Mathew after the Duke of Wellington. Much of the old lava flow surrounding the mountain has been quarried for industrial aggregates, and the large quarry to the north of the mountain once produced 7% of New Zealand's roading aggregate. Much of the south face of the mountain was quarried up until 1967, after which pine trees were planted, covering the quarry face. The quarry has now closed and continues to be redeveloped for the Stonefields housing subdivision.

In 1963, a 45,100-cubic-meter reservoir was constructed near the summit of the cone. The largest at the time, this reservoir is still the fourth largest in the city and is currently used to supply the Saint Johns reservoir as well as the suburbs of Glen Innes, Saint Johns, Saint Heliers, Kohimarama and Glendowie.

In the 2014 Treaty of Waitangi settlement between the Crown and the Ngā Mana Whenua o Tāmaki Makaurau collective of 13 Auckland iwi and hapū (also known as the Tāmaki Collective), ownership of the 14 Tūpuna Maunga of Tāmaki Makaurau / Auckland, was vested to the collective, including the volcano officially named Maungarei / Mount Wellington. The legislation specified that the land be held in trust "for the common benefit of Ngā Mana Whenua o Tāmaki Makaurau and the other people of Auckland". The Tūpuna Maunga o Tāmaki Makaurau Authority or Tūpuna Maunga Authority (TMA) is the co-governance organisation established to administer the 14 Tūpuna Maunga. Auckland Council manages the Tūpuna Maunga under the direction of the TMA.

In 2018 the summit of Maungarei became accessible to pedestrians only with a barrier installed across the access road.
