= Allan Kerr Taylor =

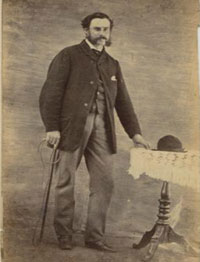
Allan Kerr Taylor

Allan Kerr Taylor (30 December 1832 – 14 April 1890) was a notable New Zealand landowner and businessman. He was born in Negapatam, India in 1832. His second wife was Sophia Taylor (née Davis).

His father was General William Taylor.

== Personal life ==
In 1848, he emigrated to New Zealand where his father owned land at West Tamaki. At the age of 16, he bought 270 acres (110 hectares) of land at Mount Albert, later adding another 352 acres (142 hectares), and calling the property Alberton.

Allan Kerr Taylor's three eldest brothers lived in Auckland near the Tamaki River: Charles John Taylor at Glen Orchard (now Saint Heliers), William Innes Taylor at Glen Innes, and Richard James Taylor at Glen Dowie. The names of the latter two properties became the names of the suburbs Glen Innes and Glendowie respectively.

The Mount Albert Taylors became known as the Kerr Taylors or Kerr-Taylors – apparently adopting Allan's middle name as part of their surname.

Kerr Taylor was a member of the Auckland Provincial Council. He represented the Northern Division from October 1855 to August 1857, and from December 1869 to October 1873. He stood in the 1876 election in the Eden electorate and came second to Joseph Tole.

== Legacy ==
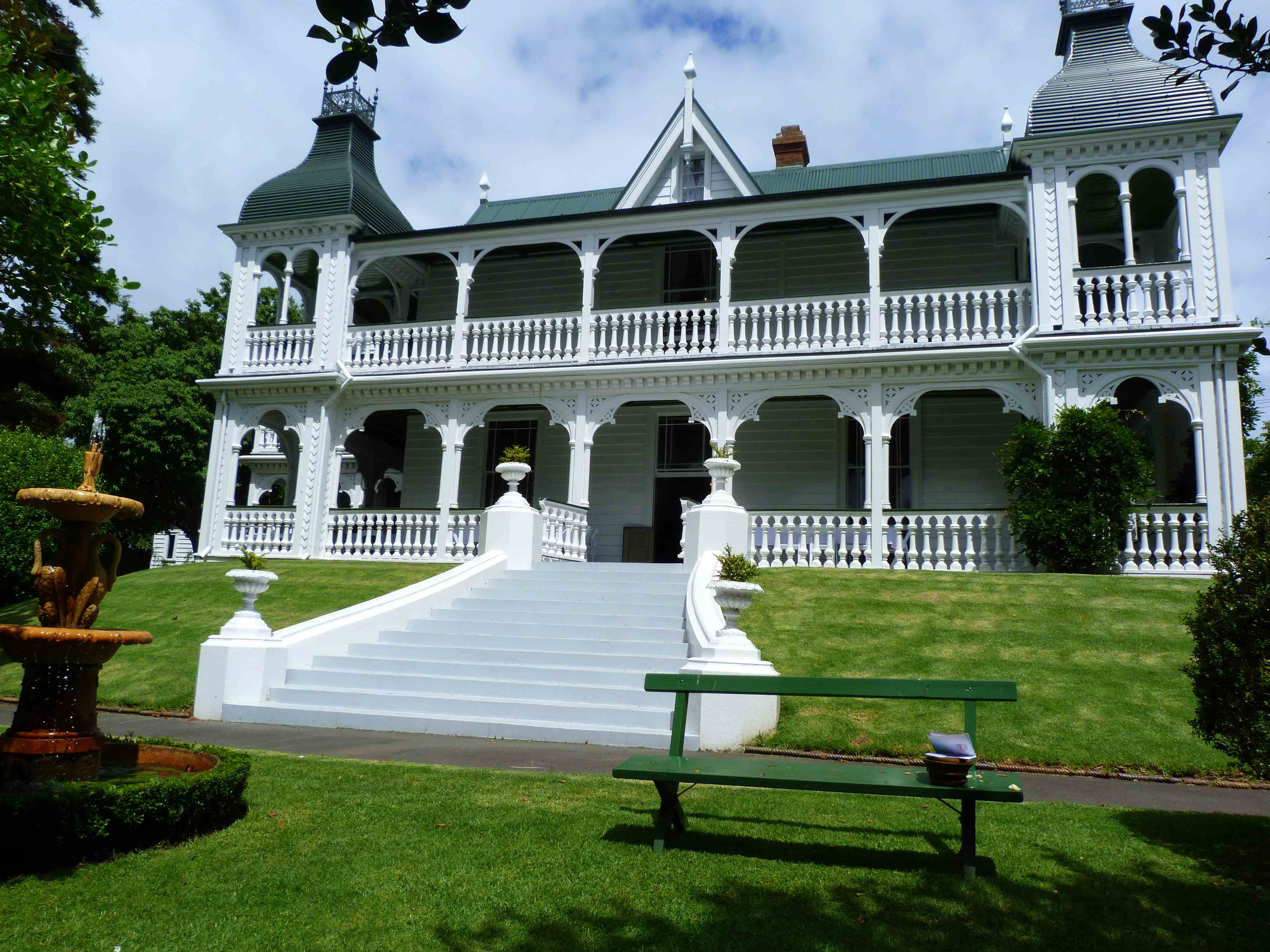
Alberton in 2012

Alberton, an 18-room mansion, was bequeathed to the public by the descendants of Allan Kerr Taylor in 1972. It is situated on Mount Albert Road in Mount Albert, close to Kerr Taylor Avenue. On 7 April 1983, Alberton was registered by the New Zealand Historic Places Trust (now Heritage New Zealand) as a Category I heritage structure, with register number 26.

Alberton and Kerr Taylor Avenues are two roads in Mount Albert located on land formerly owned by Kerr Taylor.
