= West Tamaki =

West Tamaki, also known as Tamaki West, or simply Tamaki, is a district on the Auckland isthmus in New Zealand. West Tamaki was obtained by the Crown in 1841 and was divided into large farming allotments that over time came to be acquired by the Taylor family, who split their farms into Glen Orchard, Glen Innes, and Glendowie. West Tamaki had its own governing road board until 1928, when it was subsumed into the City of Auckland. West Tamaki was subdivided over the years with a large state housing development occurring from the 1940s. The Taylor family homestead of Glen Orchard still survives, as do the names Glendowie and Glen Innes in the suburbs of the area.

== Geography ==
1930s map of West Tamaki

West Tamaki covers the eastern part of the Auckland isthmus and includes the suburbs of St Heliers, Kohimarama Glen Innes, and Glendowie. It does not include Orakei or Panmure

== History ==
The land around Taylor's Hill was occupied by Ngati Titahi. In the 1740s the area was conquered by Ngati Whatua.

The Crown purchased West Tamaki in 1841 as part of the Kohimarama Block.

Aerial view of West Tamaki

Surveyor-General Felton Mathew considered West Tamaki as a suitable site for the future capital but Governor William Hobson rejected it due to a lack of water supply to the area and a lack of suitable sites for anchorage of large vessels.

In February 1842 the land was put up for sale. 218 acres (88 ha) was purchased by Lieutenant-Colonel Thomas Bunbury for £228 12s 2d. During his expedition Bunbury had been impressed with the scenery and when he had heard the land was for sale he instructed an assistant to attend the auction. He later purchased two neighbouring sections to expand his holdings by 230 acres (93 ha) for £242 7s 10d. Bunbury spent over £700 on developing the land. William Innes Taylor first obtained a 92 acres (37 ha) section in West Tamaki in 1845, that same year he doubled his holdings by obtaining a neighbouring 87 acres (35 ha) section. Taylor later acquired the 218 acre section of Bunbury and named the property Glen Orchard, it covered St Heliers around St Heliers Bay Road. The Taylor family continued to obtain the neighbouring sections and in 1856 they held 1,575 acres (637 ha). Glen Orchard became the farm for William Innes' father, Lieutenant-General William Taylor from 1857. William Innes farmed Glen Innes until his death in 1890, with the section totaling 795 acres (322 ha). Richard James, brother of William Innes, farmed 562 acres (227 ha) with his farm named Glendowie. The Glen Orchard homestead remains intact, and is registered with Heritage New Zealand as a category 2 building.

In the 1940s West Tamaki was chosen to be an area for large state housing development and continued to have state houses built for almost 20 years. Much of this housing was constructed around Point England.

== Governance ==
The West Tamaki Road District was formed and was operational on 16 August 1862. It amalgamated with the City of Auckland on 1 April 1928.

A licensing committee serviced the area in the late 19th-century.
