= Glendowie, New Zealand =

Glendowie
- Suburb
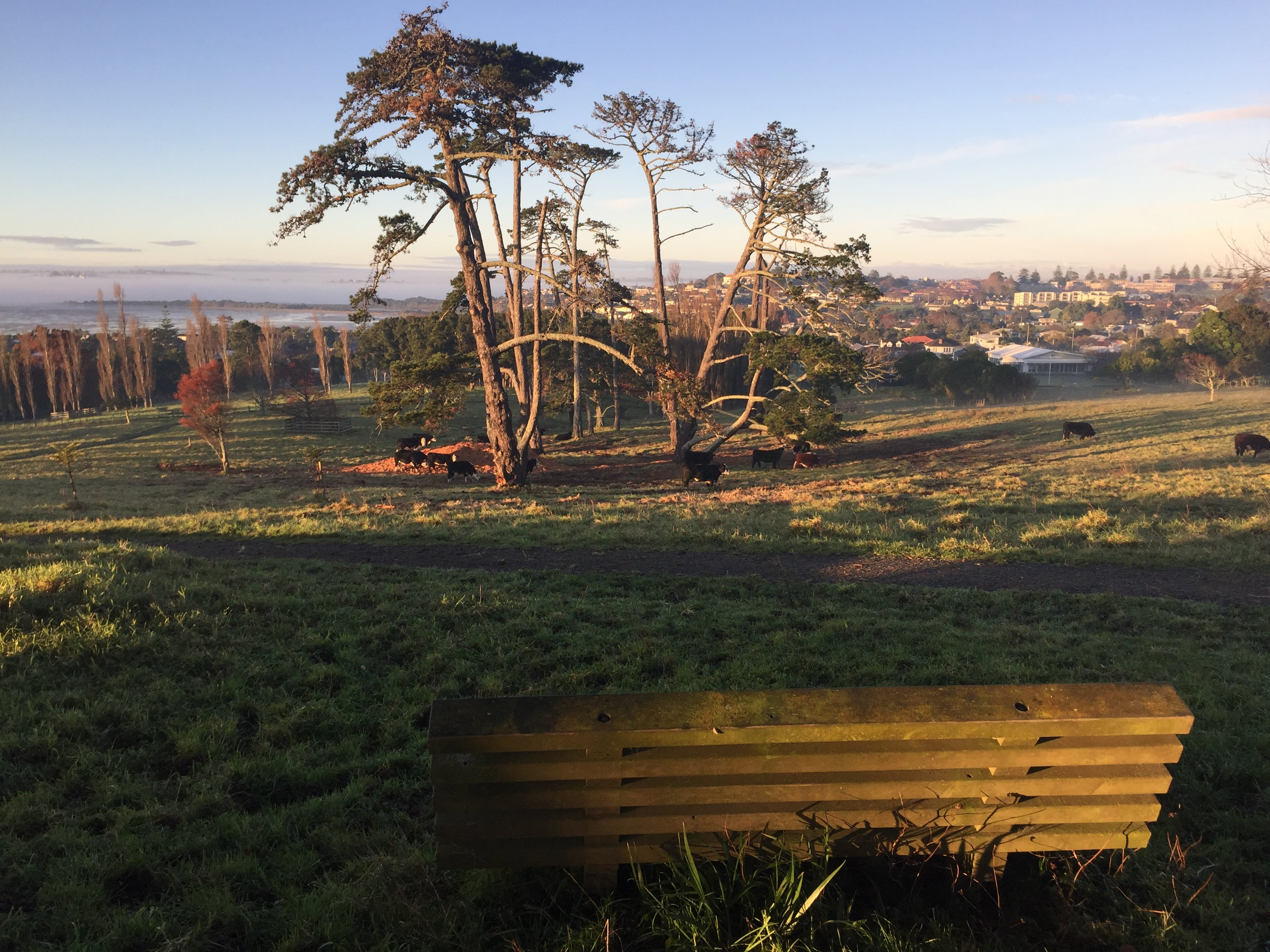
- Churchill Park
- Interactive map of Glendowie
- Coordinates: 36.85152°S 174.87045°E
- Country: New Zealand
- City: Auckland
- Local authority: Auckland Council
- Electoral ward: Ōrākei ward
- Local board: Ōrākei Local Board

Area
  - Land: 405 ha (1,000 acres)

Population (June 2025)
  - Total: 8,690
  - Density: 2,150/km^{2} (5,560/sq mi)

| Saint Heliers | (Hauraki Gulf) |
| | Glendowie | (Tamaki River) |
| Glen Innes | Wai o Taiki Bay |

Glendowie is a suburb in Auckland, New Zealand. It is under the local governance of Auckland Council. It was under Auckland City Council from 1989 until the merger of all of Auckland's councils into the "super city" in 2010.

== Location ==
Glendowie is located on the north-eastern extent of the Auckland isthmus. Its northern and eastern boundaries are defined by the Waitematā Harbour and the Tamaki Estuary.

The suburbs exhibit an affluent suburban residential character.

== History ==
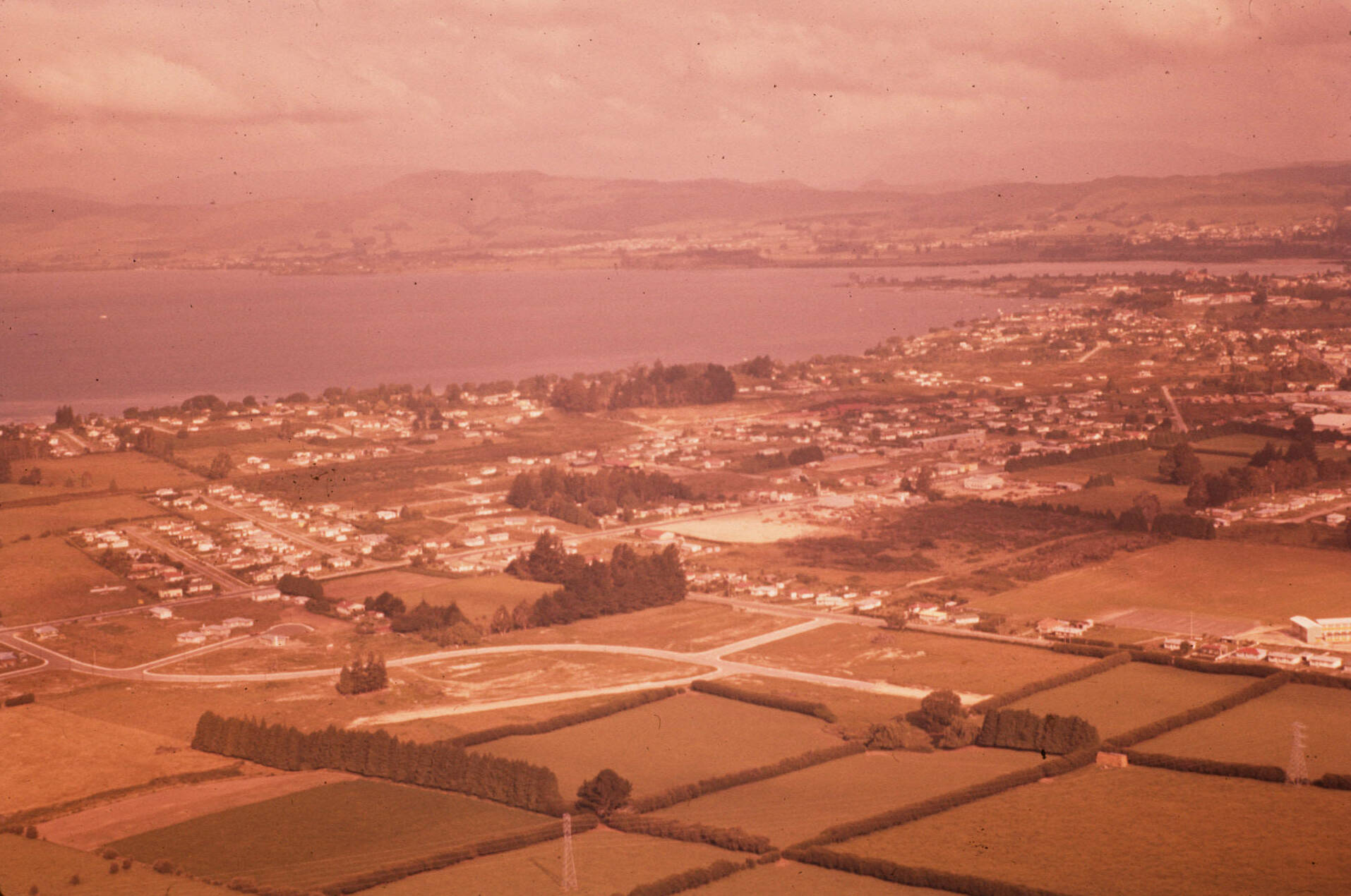
Aerial view of Glendowie in 1961

Historically, the area of Glendowie around Taylors Hill was a forest of mostly pūriri trees. The eastern edge of Glendowie bordering the Tāmaki River was called Tauoma, and was the Eastern edge of the area settled by Te Waiohua, the largest settlement of which was called Te Taurere (located at Taylors Hill). Around 1750, Ngāti Whātua expanded their territory further into Tāmaki Makaurau, and gifted the land to Ngāti Pāoa in the late 1700s.

The suburb of Glendowie was established in the 1920s, when George Riddell created a loop road through the area. It takes its name from one of the much earlier Taylor Brothers' farm estates, Glen Dowie, owned by Richard James Taylor. Two of his brothers also had farms in this area and built houses; Charles John Taylor at Glen Orchard (now St. Heliers) and William Innes Taylor at Glen Innes (gave its name to the suburb Glen Innes). Their brother, Allen Kerr Taylor, lived near Mount Albert in a house called Alberton.

== Demographics ==
Glendowie covers 4.05 km^{2} (1.56 sq mi) and had an estimated population of 8,690 as of June 2025, with a population density of 2,146 people per km^{2}.

Historical population
| Year | Pop. | ±% p.a. |
|---|---|---|
| 2006 | 7,971 | — |
| 2013 | 8,448 | +0.83% |
| 2018 | 8,835 | +0.90% |
| 2023 | 8,493 | −0.79% |

Roberta Reserve in Glendowie

Glendowie had a population of 8,493 in the 2023 New Zealand census, a decrease of 342 people (−3.9%) since the 2018 census, and an increase of 45 people (0.5%) since the 2013 census. There were 4,137 males, 4,341 females and 15 people of other genders in 2,862 dwellings. 2.5% of people identified as LGBTIQ+. The median age was 43.1 years (compared with 38.1 years nationally). There were 1,707 people (20.1%) aged under 15 years, 1,482 (17.4%) aged 15 to 29, 3,903 (46.0%) aged 30 to 64, and 1,404 (16.5%) aged 65 or older.

People could identify as more than one ethnicity. The results were 78.8% European (Pākehā); 5.9% Māori; 3.7% Pasifika; 17.0% Asian; 3.1% Middle Eastern, Latin American and African New Zealanders (MELAA); and 1.8% other, which includes people giving their ethnicity as "New Zealander". English was spoken by 96.4%, Māori language by 0.9%, Samoan by 0.6%, and other languages by 22.4%. No language could be spoken by 1.1% (e.g. too young to talk). New Zealand Sign Language was known by 0.3%. The percentage of people born overseas was 38.5, compared with 28.8% nationally.

Religious affiliations were 37.4% Christian, 1.3% Hindu, 1.6% Islam, 0.2% Māori religious beliefs, 1.2% Buddhist, 0.3% New Age, 0.8% Jewish, and 1.0% other religions. People who answered that they had no religion were 50.6%, and 5.8% of people did not answer the census question.

Of those at least 15 years old, 3,111 (45.8%) people had a bachelor's or higher degree, 2,598 (38.3%) had a post-high school certificate or diploma, and 1,074 (15.8%) people exclusively held high school qualifications. The median income was $52,900, compared with $41,500 nationally. 1,953 people (28.8%) earned over $100,000 compared to 12.1% nationally. The employment status of those at least 15 was that 3,399 (50.1%) people were employed full-time, 1,068 (15.7%) were part-time, and 171 (2.5%) were unemployed.

Individual statistical areas
| Name | Area (km^{2}) | Population | Density (per km^{2}) | Dwellings | Median age | Median income |
|---|---|---|---|---|---|---|
| Glendowie North | 1.71 | 3,270 | 1,912 | 1,062 | 43.5 years | $59,400 |
| Glendowie South West | 0.97 | 3,147 | 3,244 | 1,065 | 39.9 years | $55,700 |
| Glendowie South East | 1.37 | 2,076 | 1,515 | 735 | 48.3 years | $42,500 |
| New Zealand | | | | | 38.1 years | $41,500 |

== Education ==
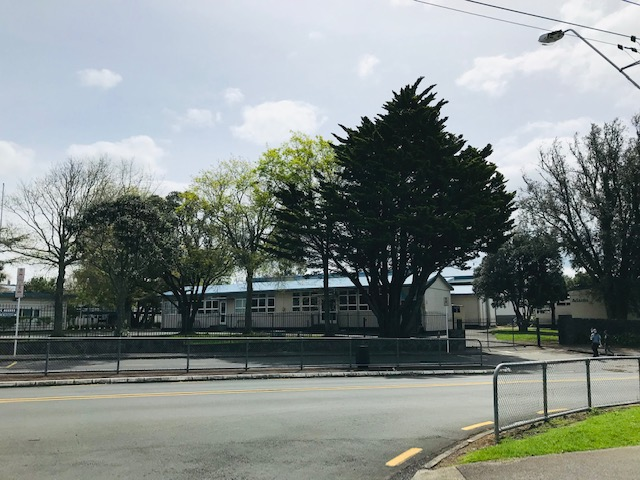
Glendowie College

Glendowie College is a secondary school (years 9–13) with a roll of 1,195.

Glendowie School (an IB World School), Churchill Park School and Glen Taylor School are full primary schools (years 1–8) with rolls of 656, 391 and 173 students, respectively.

Sacred Heart College is a state-integrated Catholic boys' school (years 7–13) with a roll of 1,511.

Apart from Sacred Heart, all of these schools are co-educational. Rolls are as of July 2026.

== Sports clubs ==
Glendowie has a tennis club, bowls club and taekwondo club, all located adjacent to Churchill Park. The Glendowie Boating Club, home of the Starling class, is located on Glendowie Road. The Eastern Suburbs soccer club and Bayside Westhaven baseball clubs hold matches at Crossfield Reserve.

== Notable residents ==
- Graeme Hart, businessman
- Don Brash, former New Zealand leader of the opposition (National Party 2003–2006)

== See also ==
- Tahuna Torea Nature Reserve
