= Sophia Taylor =

New Zealand suffragist (1847–1930)

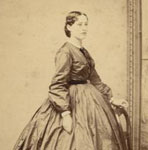
- Sophia Taylor
- Born: Sophia Louisa Davis; 2 July 1847; Kaitaia, New Zealand
- Died: 24 January 1930 (aged 82); Alberton, Mount Albert, Auckland
- Occupation: landowner
- Known for: suffragist, hostess

Sophia Louisa Taylor (2 July 1847 – 24 January 1930) was a New Zealand suffragist and landowner.

== Early life ==
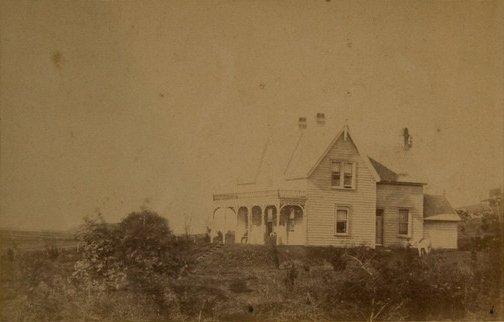
Alberton before 1875

She was born Sophia Davis in Kaitaia, Northland, New Zealand in 1847. Her parents were the private tutor John Davis, who worked for the Matthews and Puckey missionary families, and Mary Ann Cryer. In 1855 William Gilbert Puckey dismissed her father from his position and the family consequently moved to Auckland.

She married Allan Kerr Taylor, a widower with substantial land holdings who was 15 years her senior, on 8 June 1865. They resided at his farmhouse, Alberton, in Mount Albert. They had six daughters and four sons, born between 1866 and 1888.

The family was actively engaged in St Luke's Church, following the Anglican faith, whilst Allan Taylor's father and three half brothers were all Presbyterian. Allan Kerr Taylor's three half brothers also lived in Auckland - all near the Tamaki River: Charles John Taylor at Glen Orchard (now St Heliers), William Innes Taylor at Glen Innes, and Richard James Taylor at Glen Dowie. The names of their properties later became the names of the suburbs.

It is probably to differentiate themselves from the main part of the family that the Mt Albert Taylors adopted Allan's middle name as part of their surname - becoming the Kerr Taylors or Kerr-Taylors. This may well have simply grown out of the social conventions of the period.

The family gave the land for the church in the early 1870s and donated the church bells. St Luke's Church was registered with the New Zealand Historic Places Trust on 7 April 1983 as a Category II heritage building with registration number 681.

Alberton was expanded to an 18-room mansion in the 1870s and became known for the garden parties, hunts, and other entertainments held there.

== Children ==
Allan had two children from his first marriage but both children died in their first year, before his marriage to Sophia.

Allan and Sophia's children were:

- Vincent Frederick (9 July 1866 – 25 May 1920). Vincent attended Auckland Grammar School and later married Amy Evelyn Turner. Vincent died suddenly in 1920. They had a son, Colin Vivian Taylor (1906–1984).
- Winifred Mabel (13 August 1867 – 18 September 1964) was the oldest daughter. She attended Auckland Girls' High School and she never married.
- Mildred Amy (4 March 1869 – 24 December 1957) also attended Auckland Girls'.
- Hector Randall (28 January 1871 – 21 May 1914), unmarried. Hector had epilepsy and was tutored privately at Alberton.
- Adeline Daisy (31 July 1872 – 20 February 1874) died in infancy.
- Adeline Violet (11 March 1874 – 1966) also attended Auckland Girls'. She married Alfred Edward Gilmore in 1894, and they had four children.
- Flora Daisy (21 December 1875 – 15 September 1885) died aged nine, of a "brain fever", which may have been a form of meningitis.
- Theodore Allan (13 September 1883 – 30 April 1960) married Clare Edna Ross with whom he had four children. He later married Mabel Ebenezer Hobden.
- Muriel Hyacinth (17 January 1887 – 1972), considerably younger than her sisters, was not allowed to marry a suitor because her mother did not consider him suitable, and refused to marry anyone else.
- Lancelot Everard (1 June 1888 – 6 August 1955) served with the Auckland Mounted Rifles in the Middle East during World War I. He married Dulcie Monica Short, and they had five children.

== Later life ==
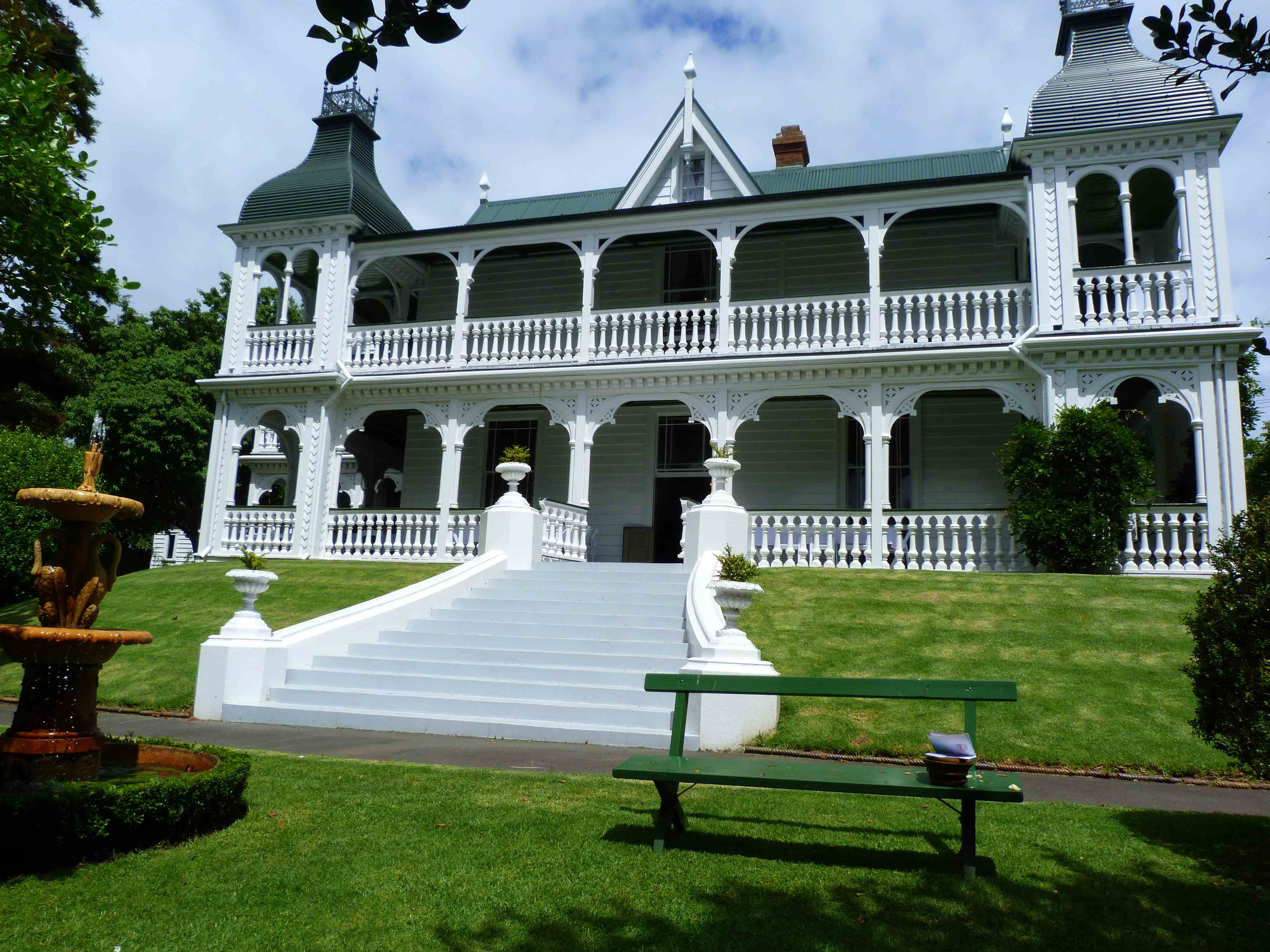
Alberton in 2012, owned by the New Zealand Historic Places Trust

Allan Taylor died in April 1890, leaving Sophia with an estate valued at £20,000 but with a £4,000 mortgage. Sophia had not been involved in her husband's business affairs and was unprepared for the financial burden.

She sold investments and land to pay death duties and sustain the household, but the family was unable to fully maintain its comfortable lifestyle. She also sold some of their horses and carriages, and possibly reduced the number of servants, including the coachman. For the next 40 years she managed the estate, earning income from the sale of its farm produce, including vegetables, fruit, and flowers, and overseeing a flock of prize poultry that provided eggs for sale.

Taylor supported the women's franchise movement because women had the same obligations as men to obey the law and pay taxes, but she was opposed to women standing for Parliament. She joined the first committee of the Women's Franchise League's Auckland branch in 1892, and also joined the Woman's Christian Temperance Union, although she was not a prohibitionist.

Taylor translated Franz Delitzsch's 'Neuer Kommentar über die Genesis' (A New Commentary on Genesis).

In 1893, women gained suffrage in New Zealand. Taylor continued to be politically active on a range of issues, both speaking and writing, as late as the end of World War I. The positions she espoused included opposition to the single-tax movement and opposition to an initiative to hunt opossums for sport.

From 1908, she ended her earlier custom of entertaining guests at Alberton and lived quietly there with her three unmarried daughters and her son Hector until his death in 1914. In 1916, 16 acres (6.5 ha) of the estate was sold for the Mount Albert Grammar School.

After her death on 24 January 1930, her three unmarried daughters, Winifred, Millicent and Muriel, took care of the estate for the rest of their lives. When the last daughter died in 1972, ownership of the estate passed to the New Zealand Historic Places Trust. Alberton is registered as a Category I historic building with registration number 26.

Sophia Taylor, her husband and their children are buried at St Luke's graveyard.
