= Tahuna Torea Nature Reserve =

Reserve in Auckland, New Zealand

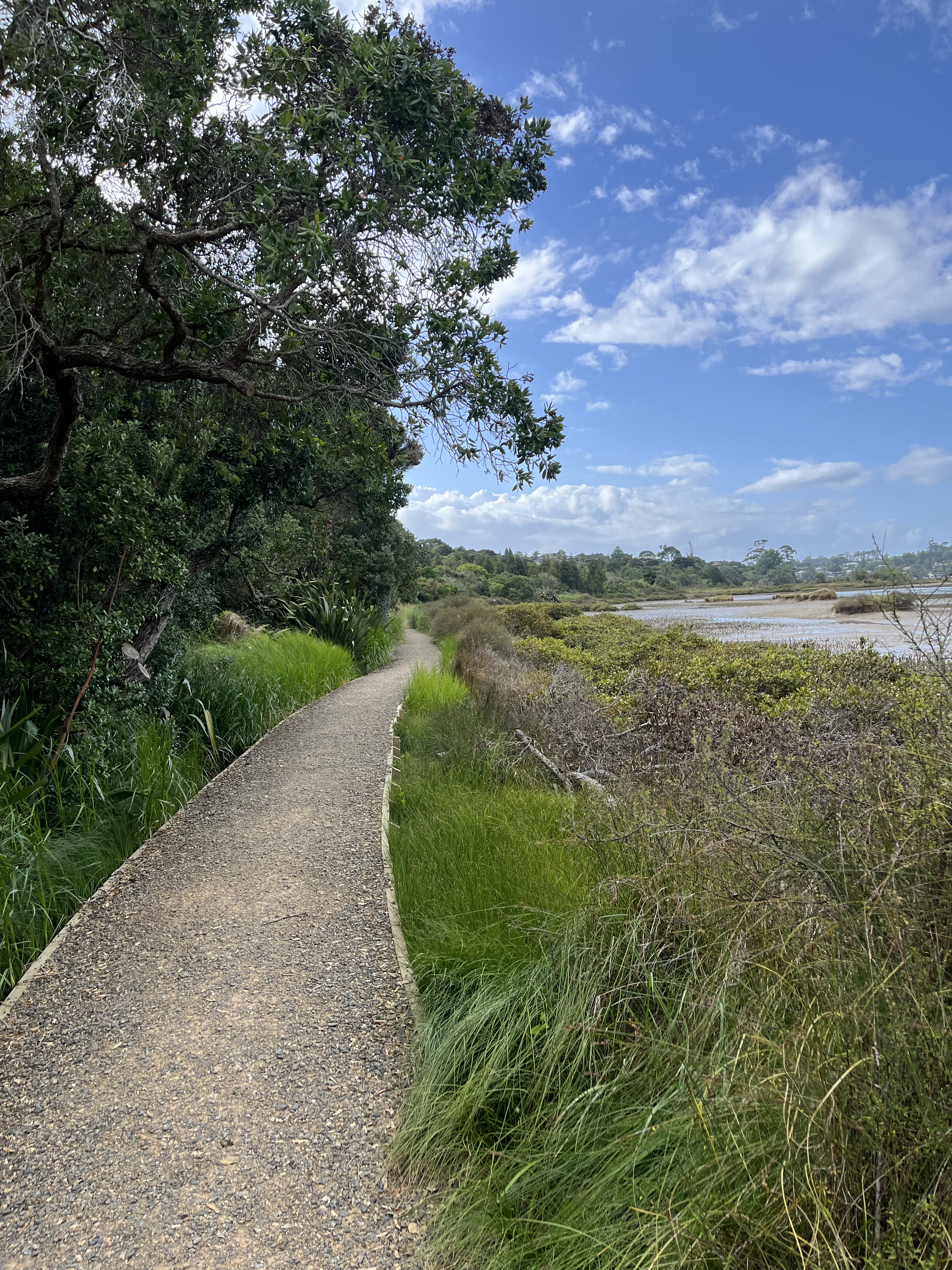
- Path at Tahuna Torea nature reserve
- Location: West Tamaki Road, Glendowie, Auckland
- Coordinates: 36°52′18″S 174°52′55″E
- Operated by: Auckland Council
- Website: Auckland Council

Tahuna Torea is a nature reserve in Auckland, New Zealand, in the suburb of Glendowie. The reserve is a coastal wetland and sandspit containing freshwater ponds, mangroves, and walking tracks through bush and overland.

== Naming ==
Tahuna Torea is a Māori-language phrase meaning "sandbank of the oystercatcher".

== History ==
=== Precolonial history ===
Tahuna Torea was a foodbasket for the growing of kūmara and the gathering of seafood, as well as growing flax and raupō for weaving. Hoturoa of Tainui waka landed at Tohuna Torea on his travels around Tāmaki. The west bank of the Tāmaki river, including Tohuna Torea, was the most highly populated part of Auckland due to its rich soil.

== Wildlife ==
The reserve has a large range of native birds including stilts, herons, kingfishers and ducks. There are fifty species of birds that inhabit Tahuna Torea and the adjacent estuary. These include the Welcome Swallow, the Shining Cuckoo (a summer visitor), and the Little Shag.

== Features ==
The Glendowie to Tahuna Torea path is a main feature.

== Gallery ==
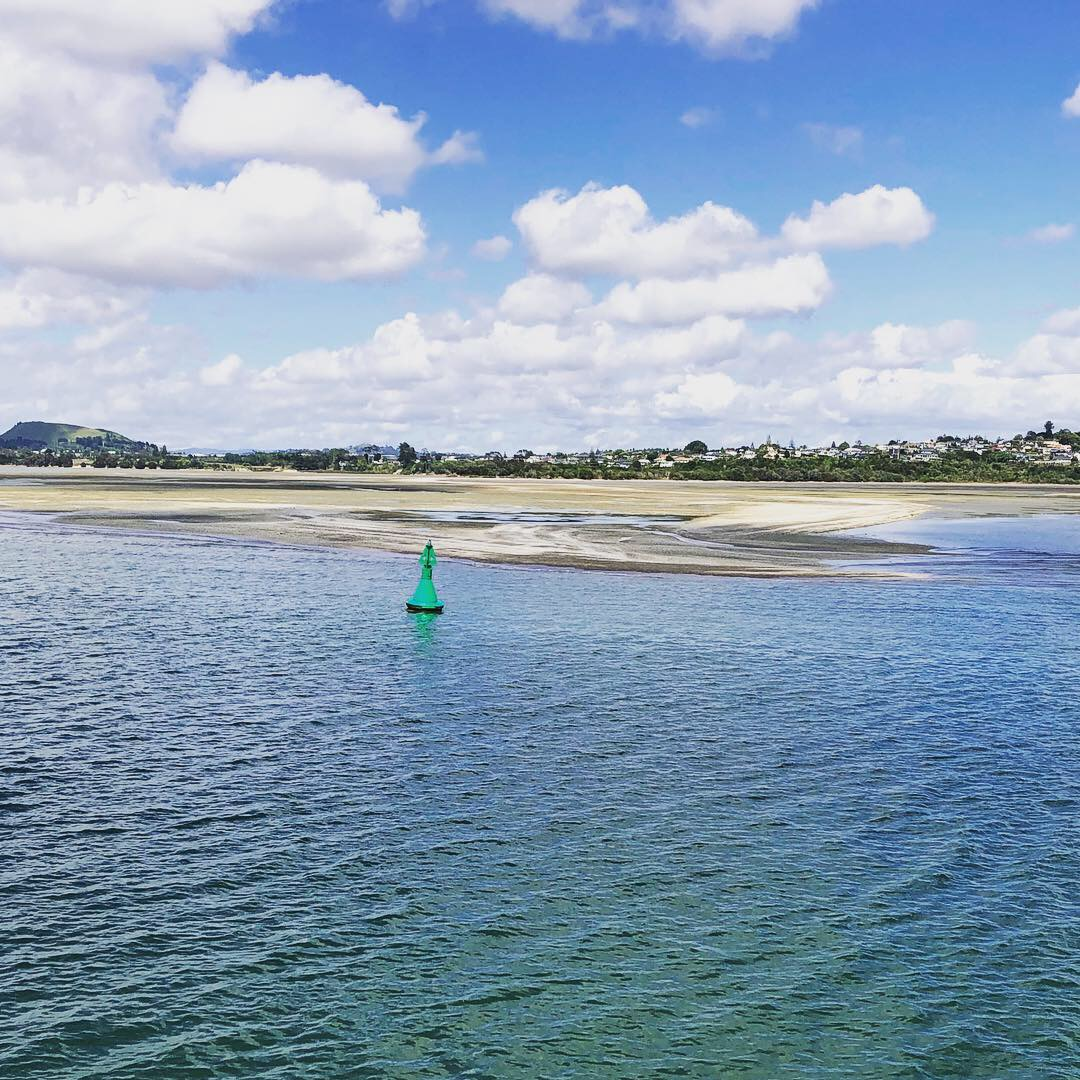
Waterfront at Tahuna Torea

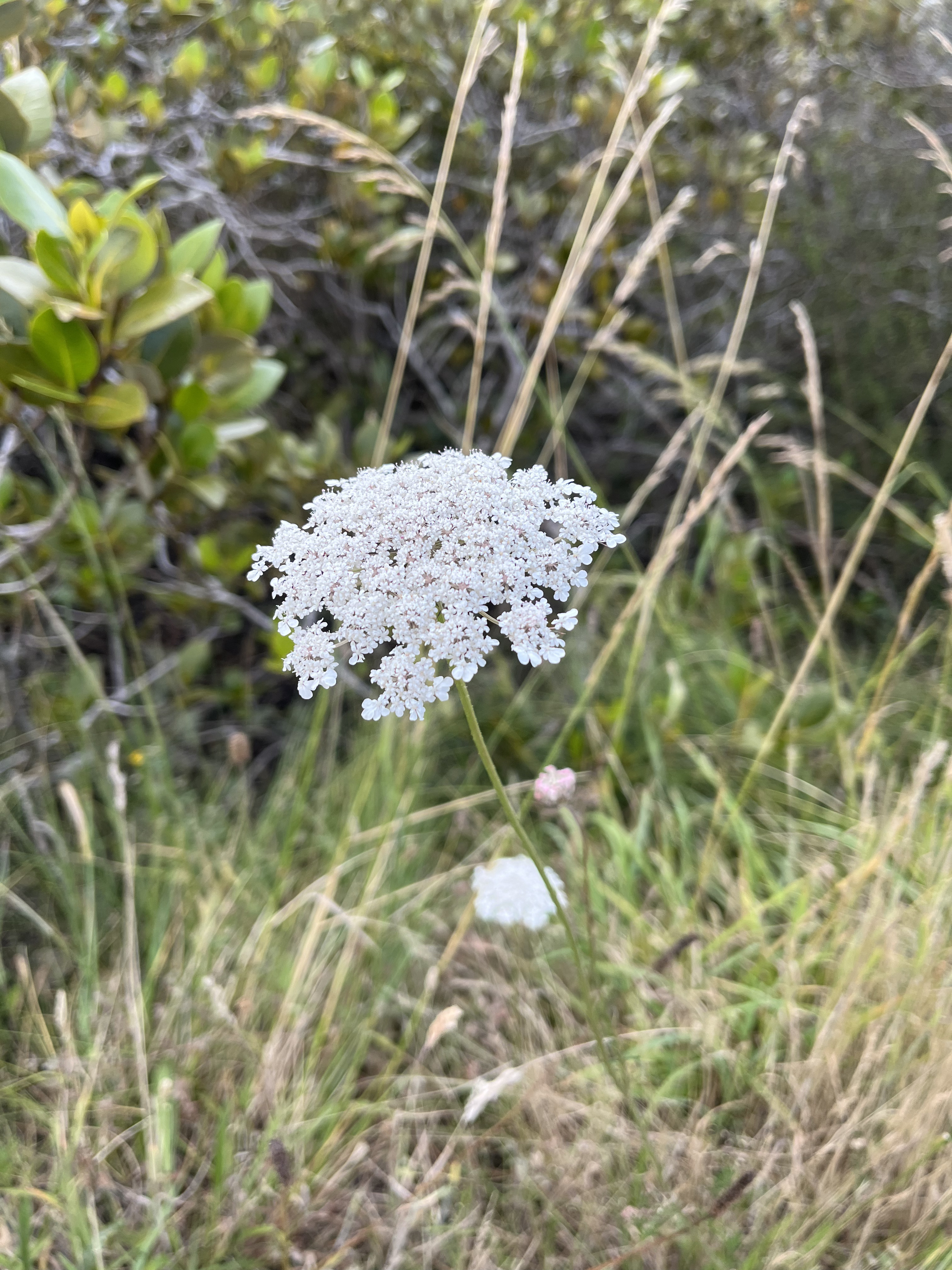

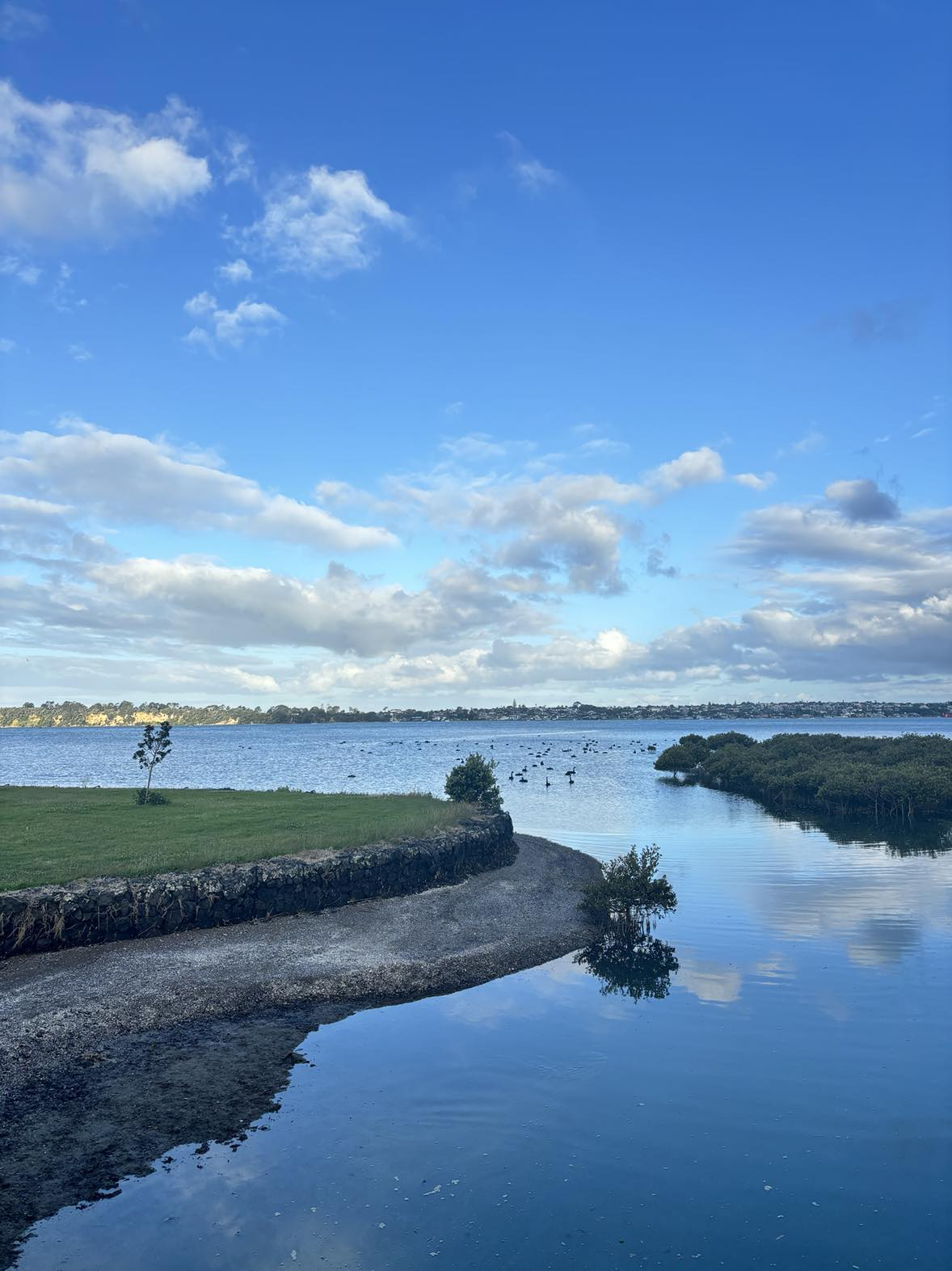
Black swans at Tahuna Torea

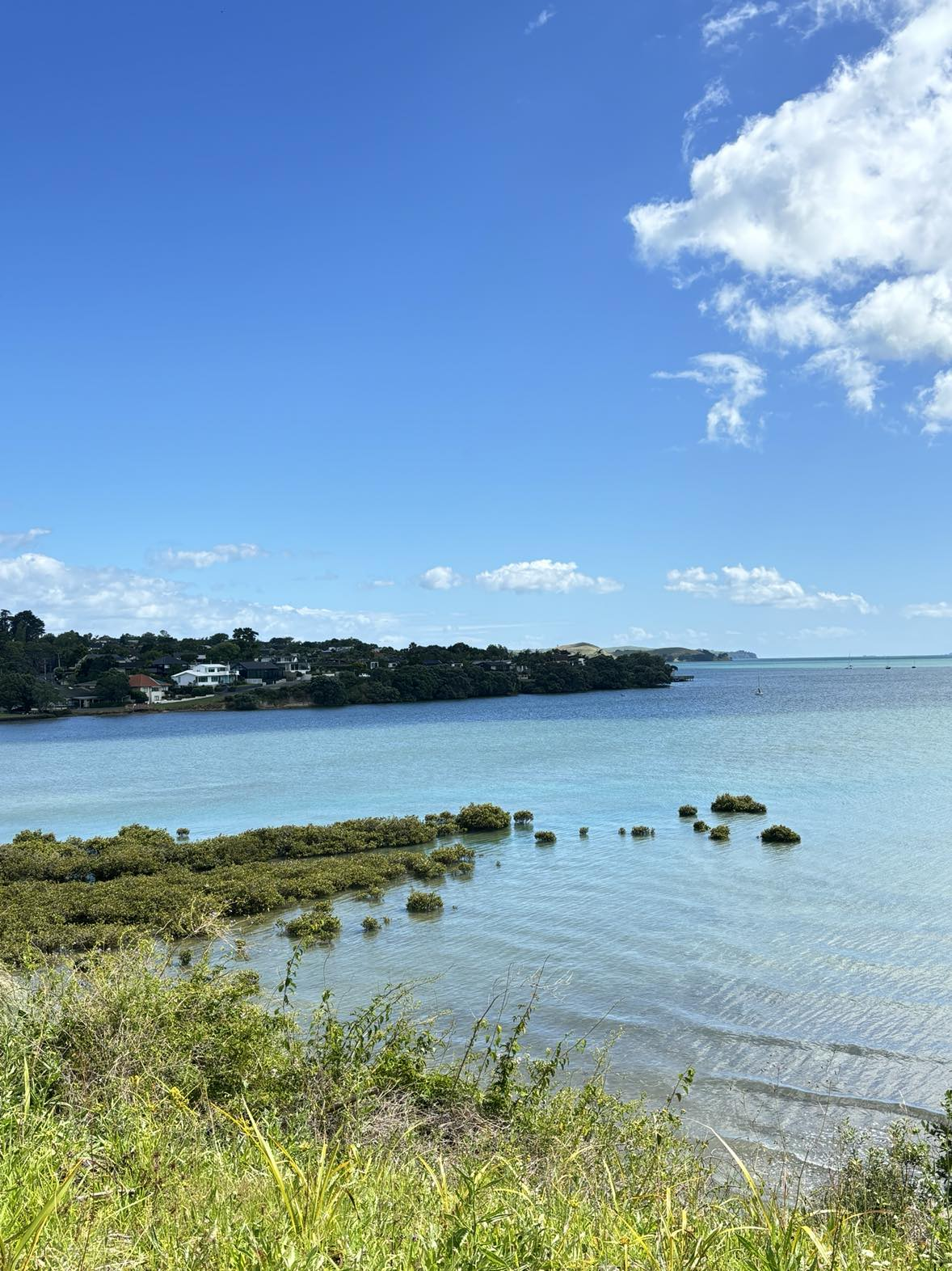

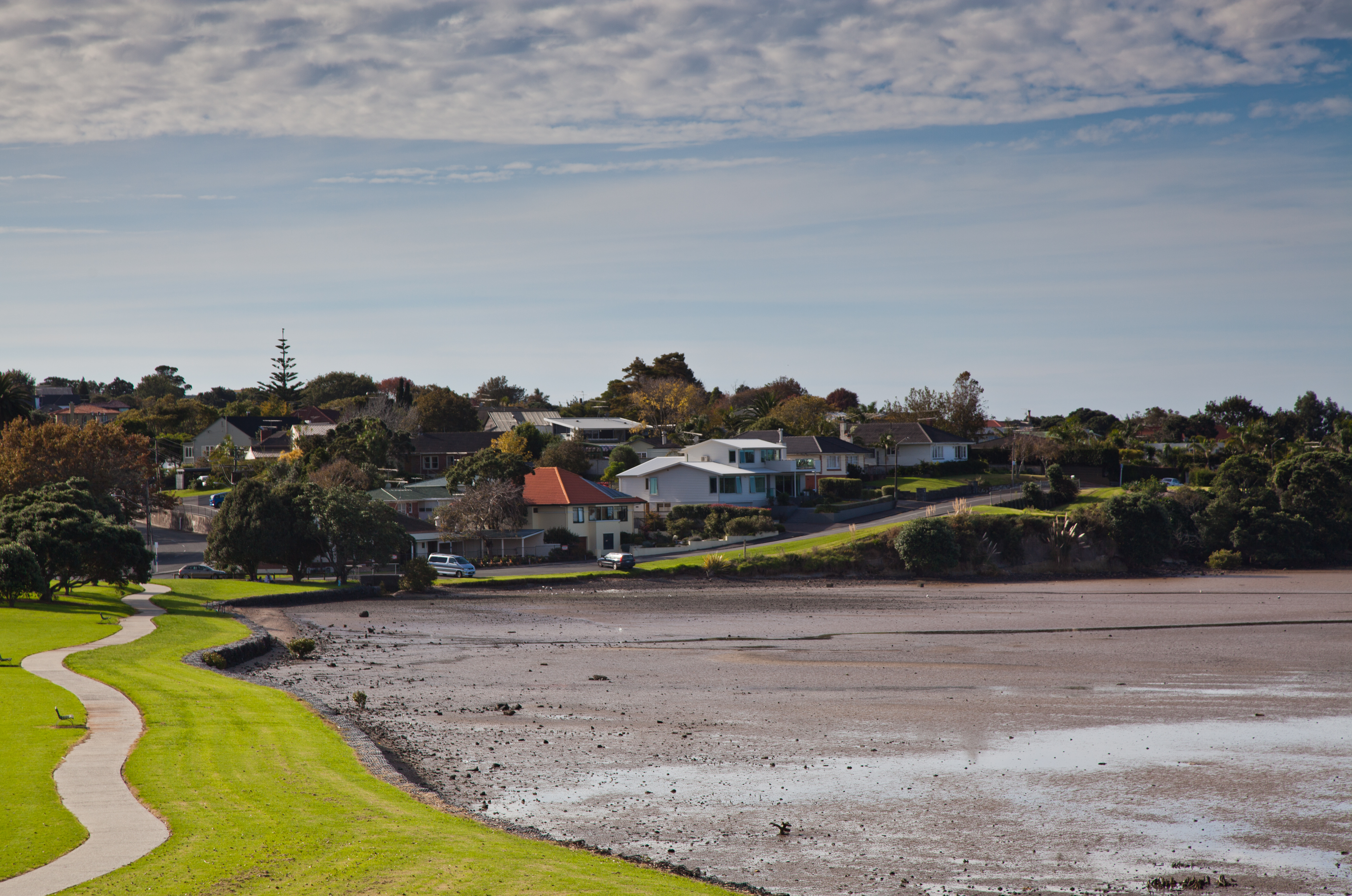
