= Alberton, Auckland =

Historic house in Auckland, New Zealand

Alberton
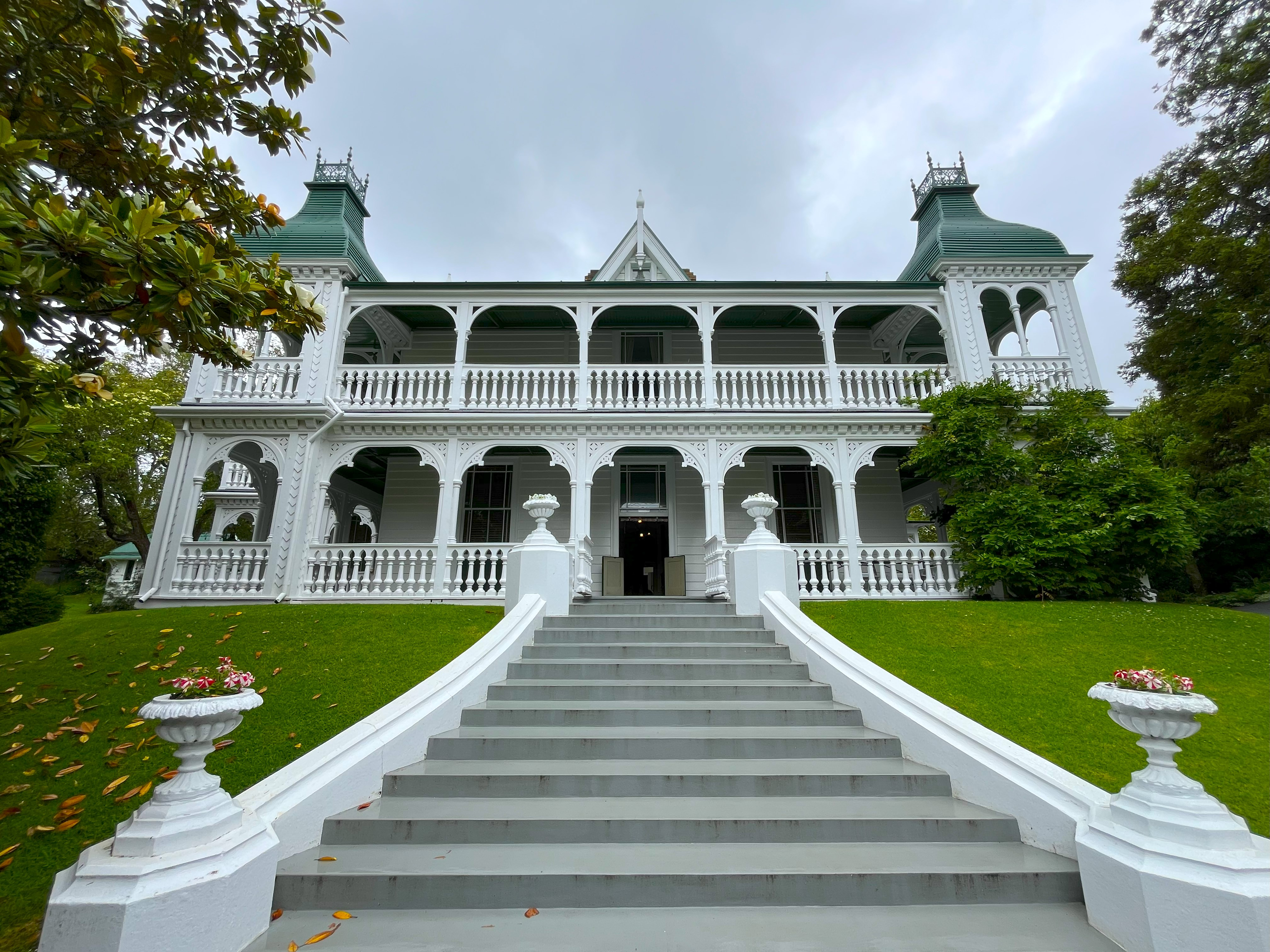
- Alberton exterior, photographed 2024
- Interactive map of the Alberton area

General information
- Location: 100 Mt Albert Road, Mt Albert, Auckland, New Zealand
- Coordinates: 36°53′24″S 174°43′29″E
- Opened: 1863

Heritage New Zealand – Category 1
- Designated: 4 April 1983
- Reference no.: 26

Alberton is a 19th-century house in Mount Albert, Auckland, New Zealand, which is listed by Heritage New Zealand as a Category I structure. The house was built in the 1860s for Allan Kerr Taylor.

== History ==
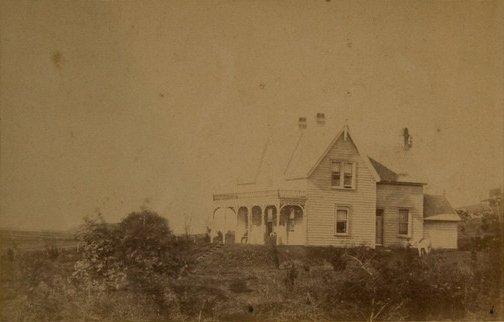
The original farmhouse design of Alberton, seen before 1875

Alberton was established as a property for New Zealand landowner Allan Kerr Taylor in 1849. In 1863, Kerr Taylor had a farmhouse constructed on the property as a centre-point for his 203-hectare estate. The house was rebuilt in the 1870s by architect Matthew Henderson into an elaborate country manor influenced by Anglo-Indian architecture. Recently widowed, he married the 18-year-old Sophia Taylor in 1865.

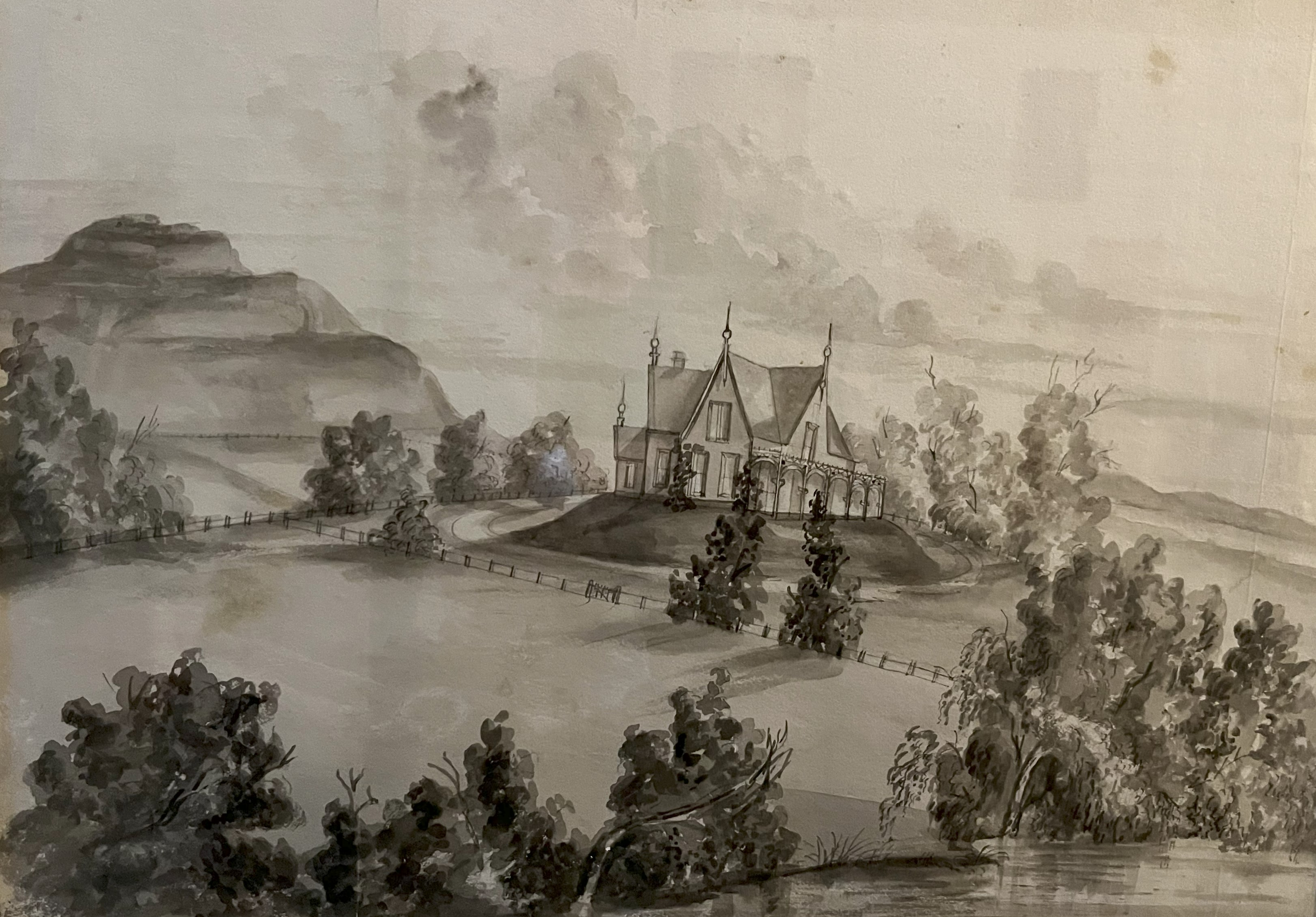
A watercolour of Alberton, author unknown, but likely done by one of the Kerr Taylor daughters

In 1890, Kerr Taylor died, while the Alberton house and farm were still highly mortgaged. Therefore, Sophia Taylor continued to administer the estate and experienced many obstacles as a woman landowner. With the help of one son (Hector), and three of the daughters (Winifred, Milfred, and Muriel), the family were able to maintain and uphold Alberton. Sophia Taylor continued to live at Alberton until she died in 1930.

In January 1939, a portion of the Alberton estate was acquired by the New Zealand Government, which established the Plant Diseases Division of the Department of Scientific and Industrial Research on the site. The site was chosen due to its variety of soils, and research on how to protect crops against disease commenced. The DSIR gradually took more of the Alberton grounds during the 20th century through compulsory purchases as a part of the Public Works Act.

Muriel Kerr Taylor, the youngest daughter of Allan Kerr and Sophia Taylor, continued to live at Alberton for the rest of her life. Much of the family had moved elsewhere, and Kerr Taylor's children often spent summer holidays at the estate or lived there while attending Mount Albert Grammar School. In 1970, Muriel learnt that the DSIR intended to purchase the land the house was on. The family moved to prevent this from happening by bequeathing the home to the National Historic Places Trust, who received it after her death in 1972.

The Historic Places Trust reopened Alberton on 8 December 1973. Alberton now operates as a heritage house open for public visitation.

== Functions & celebrations ==
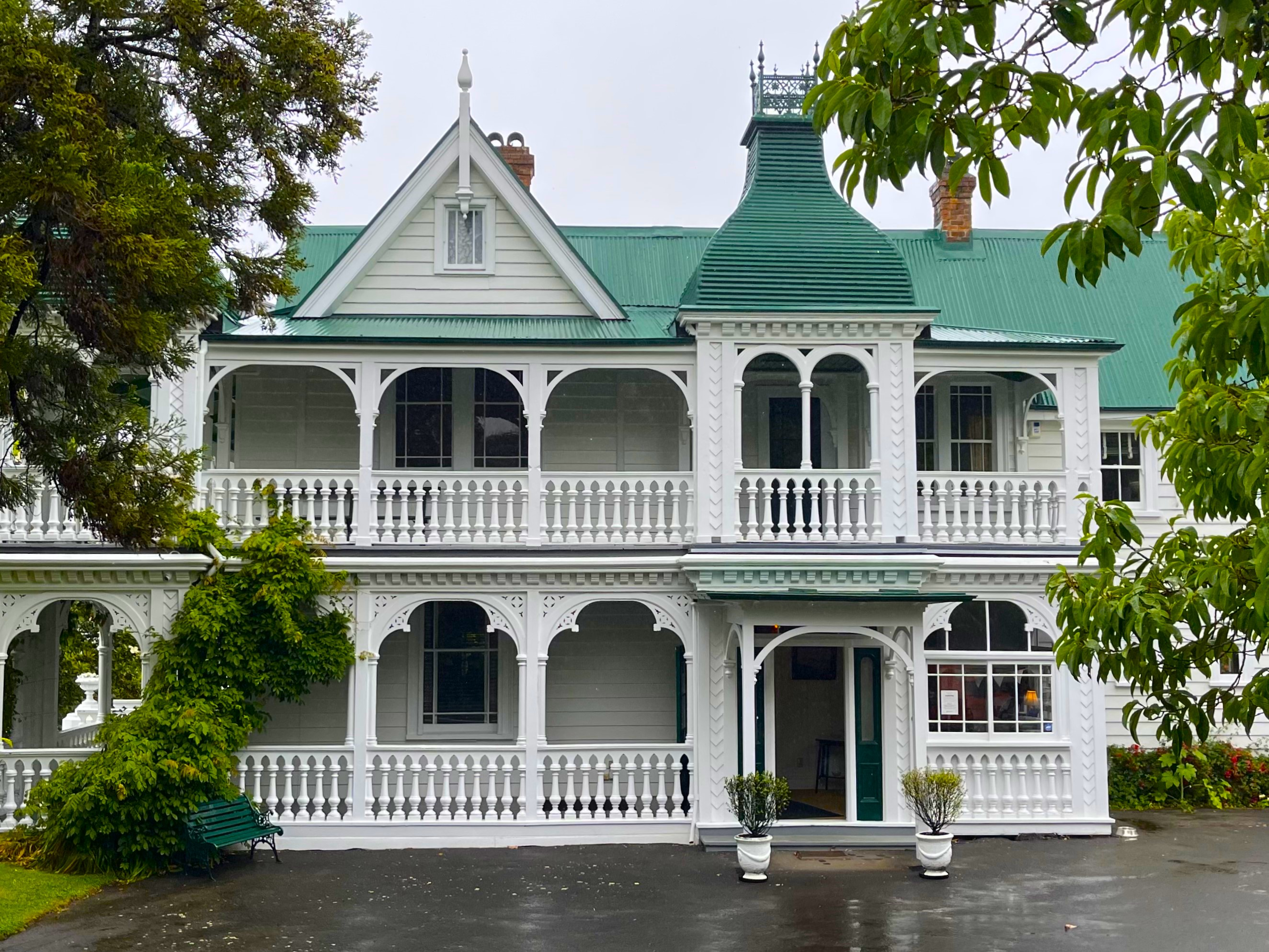
The main entrance of Alberton

The Kerr Taylor family hosted a wide number of formal social events at their property, notably throwing the first-ever county ball in New Zealand on 20 September 1877, with over 250 people in attendance. Allan Kerr Taylor was active in politics, and the purpose of the county ball was to replicate English customs, which sought to bring electors together socially and make them acquainted with each other.

Frequent meetings of the Pakuranga Hunting Club were held at Alberton. Alberton was also the venue for the 1883 Citizen's Ball, held for Governor William Jervois and his wife Lucy. From 1868, an annual party for the children of St. Luke's Sunday school was hosted by Alan Kerr and Sophia Taylor. The children were allowed to invite friends and family, and the Kerr Taylor family would, in turn, welcome their neighbours to come along to these parties, too. The New Zealand Herald and Auckland Star reported on these parties yearly, highlighting the positive reception from the public. Each year, there was a range of activities for the children and adults alike to partake in, with a feast provided by Sophia Taylor. These parties were so popular that by 1889, over 100 children from the area were attending.

== Significant rooms ==
=== The Ballroom ===
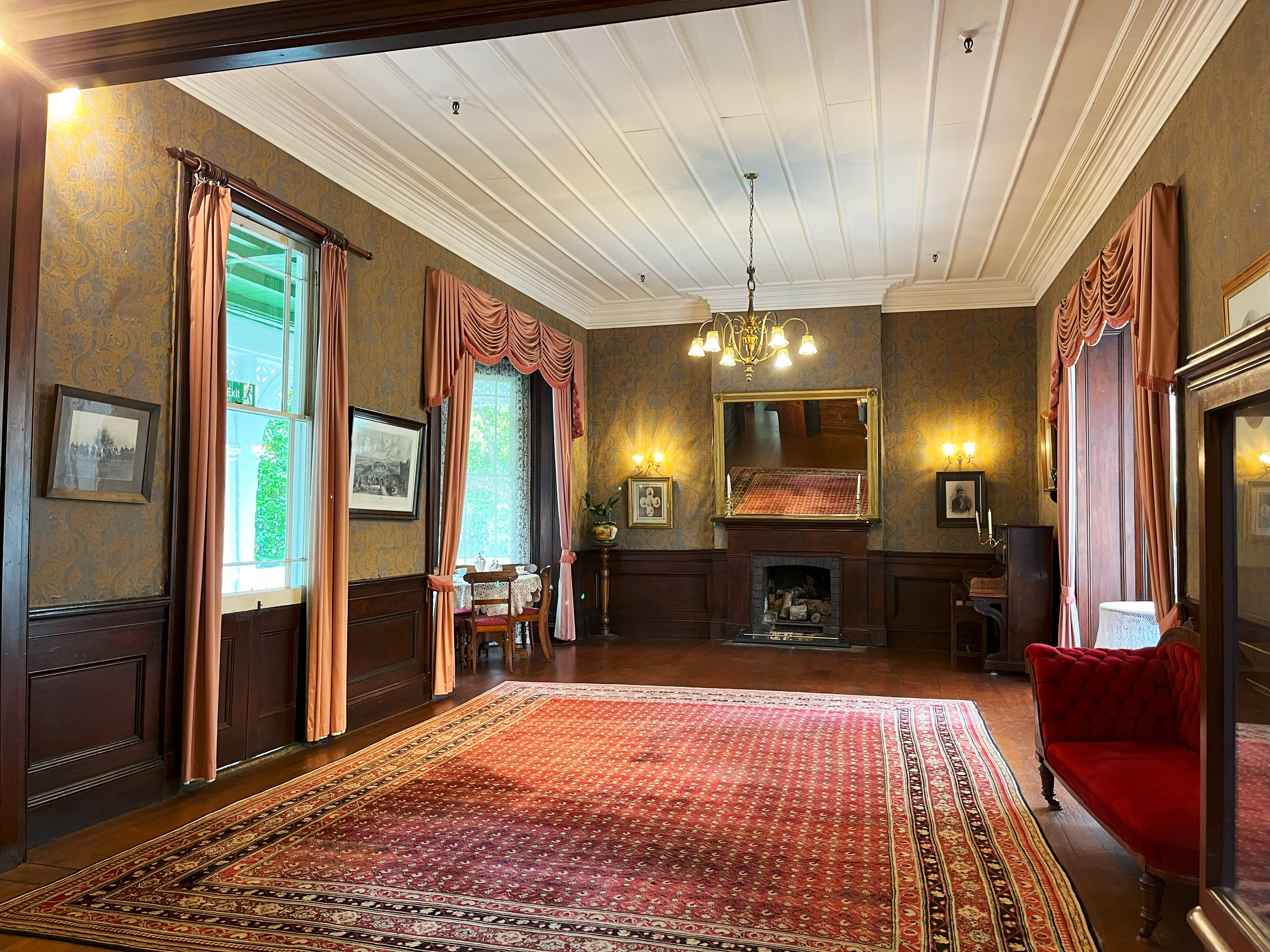
Alberton ballroom, December 2024

Alberton went from being a substantial farmhouse in the 1860s to a complete mansion in the 1870s after considerable extensions. One of the most significant extensions to the house was the addition of the ballroom, which was used as an inner sitting room by the family, complete with a breakfast area. Despite the substantial size of this room, it would still not have been large enough to hold all the people invited to the family's larger parties. While the events that the family hosted tended to take place in their timber-built barn near their house, which could accommodate more than 300 people, the ballroom is now utilised today for a variety of events, including weddings and birthday parties.

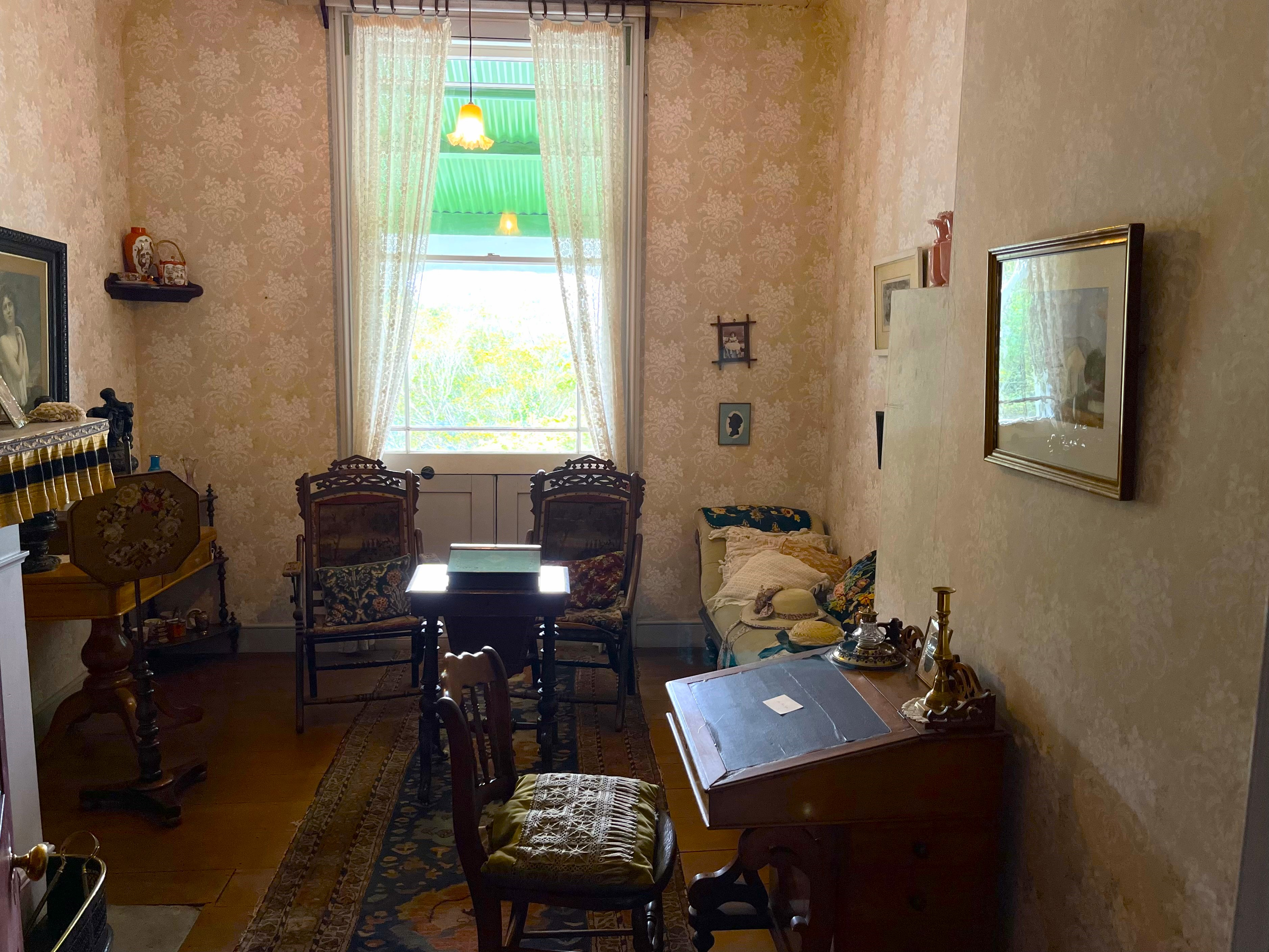
Sophia's private sitting room, December 2024

=== The Master Bedroom & Private Sitting Room ===
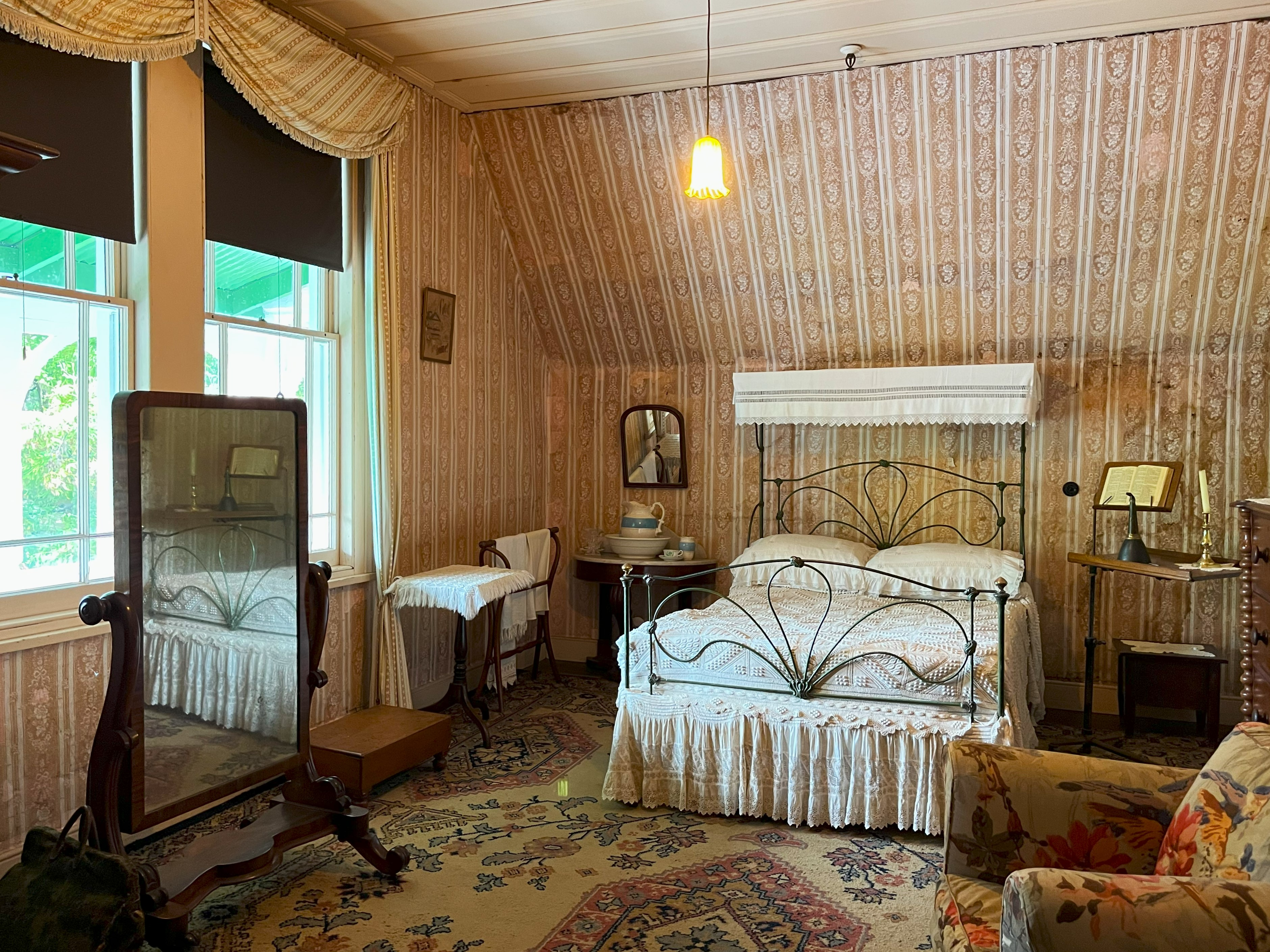
The master bedroom, December 2024

The Kerr Taylors had ten children in total: four sons and six daughters; however, one of their first sons died 5 months after being born. All ten children were born in Alberton's master bedroom. Sophia Taylor also had her own private sitting room adjacent to the master bedroom.

In the master bedroom, the floral-covered armchair in the right corner of the room is indicative of Sophia Taylor's significance in the Mount Albert Community. Sophia was gifted this chair in 1920, after 46 years as a Sunday School teacher at St Luke's Church. Evidently, she made important contributions to the Anglican faith, notably being appointed the responsibility of laying the foundation stone of the new Wesleyan Church in Mount Albert in 1882.

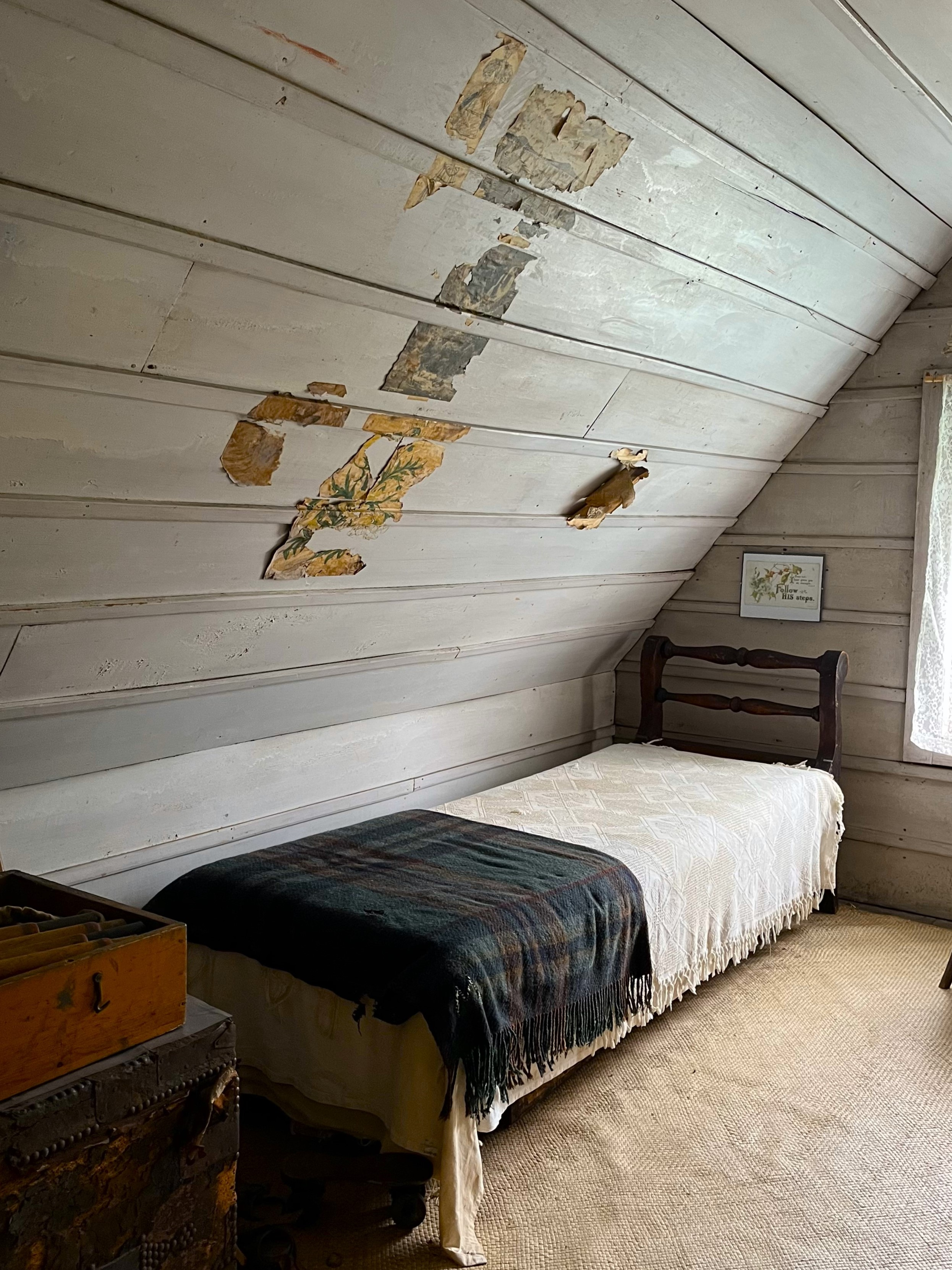
One of the attic rooms, December 2024

=== The Attic ===
Due to the size of their home, the Kerr Taylor family maintained a large household staff to manage its daily operations. Sophia Taylor regularly advertised for help between the 1860s and 1880s, with notices in the newspaper revealing a need for various roles, including a cook, laundress, general servant to wash and make butter, a housemaid or nursemaid, an accomplished governess and a general servant.

Some of the domestic workers lived full-time at Alberton, occupying the small rooms in the attic. In this period, only the wealthiest families could afford such extensive domestic help, indicating the Kerr Taylor's high social standing.

=== Gallery of Rooms ===
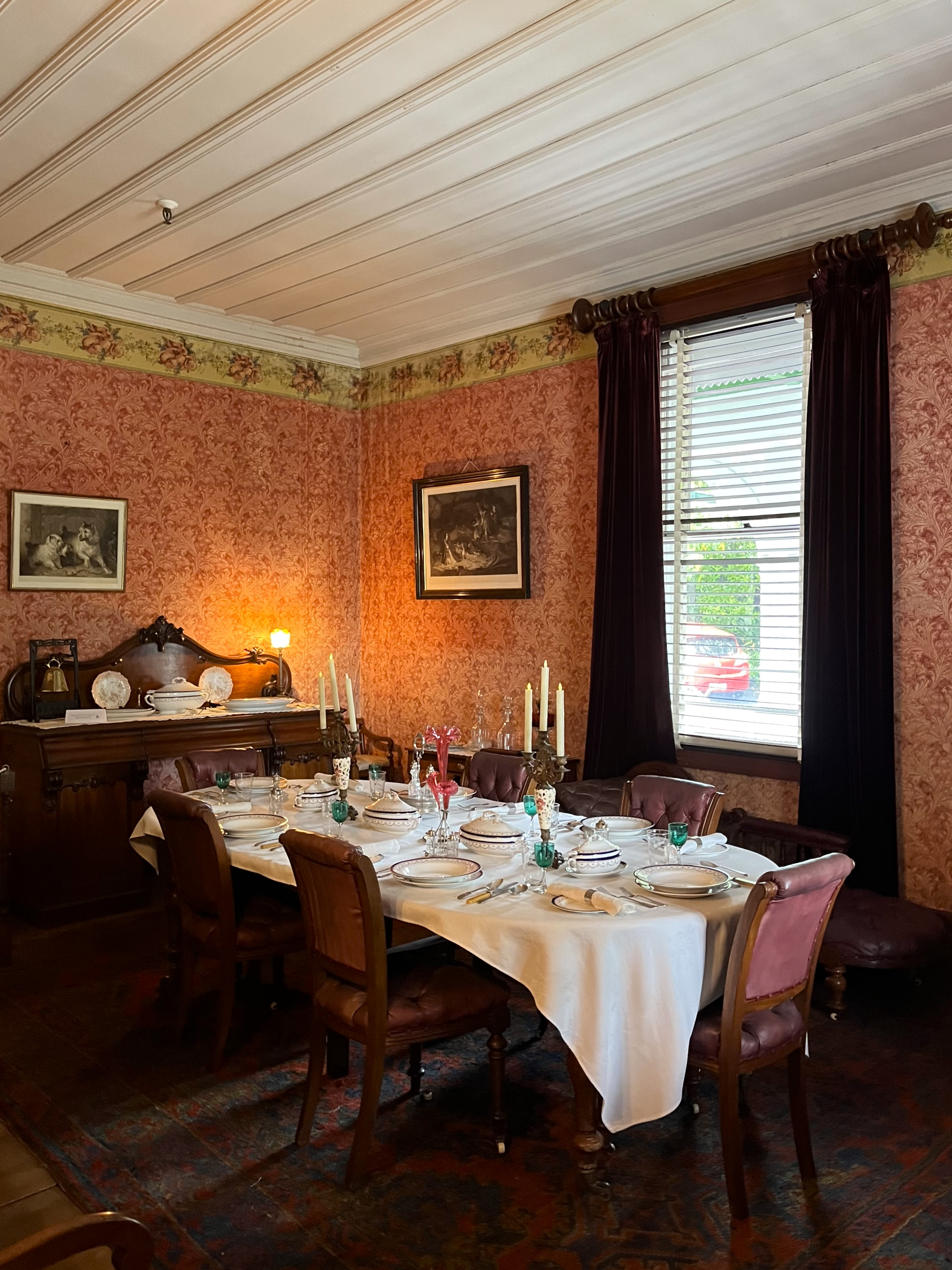
The dining room

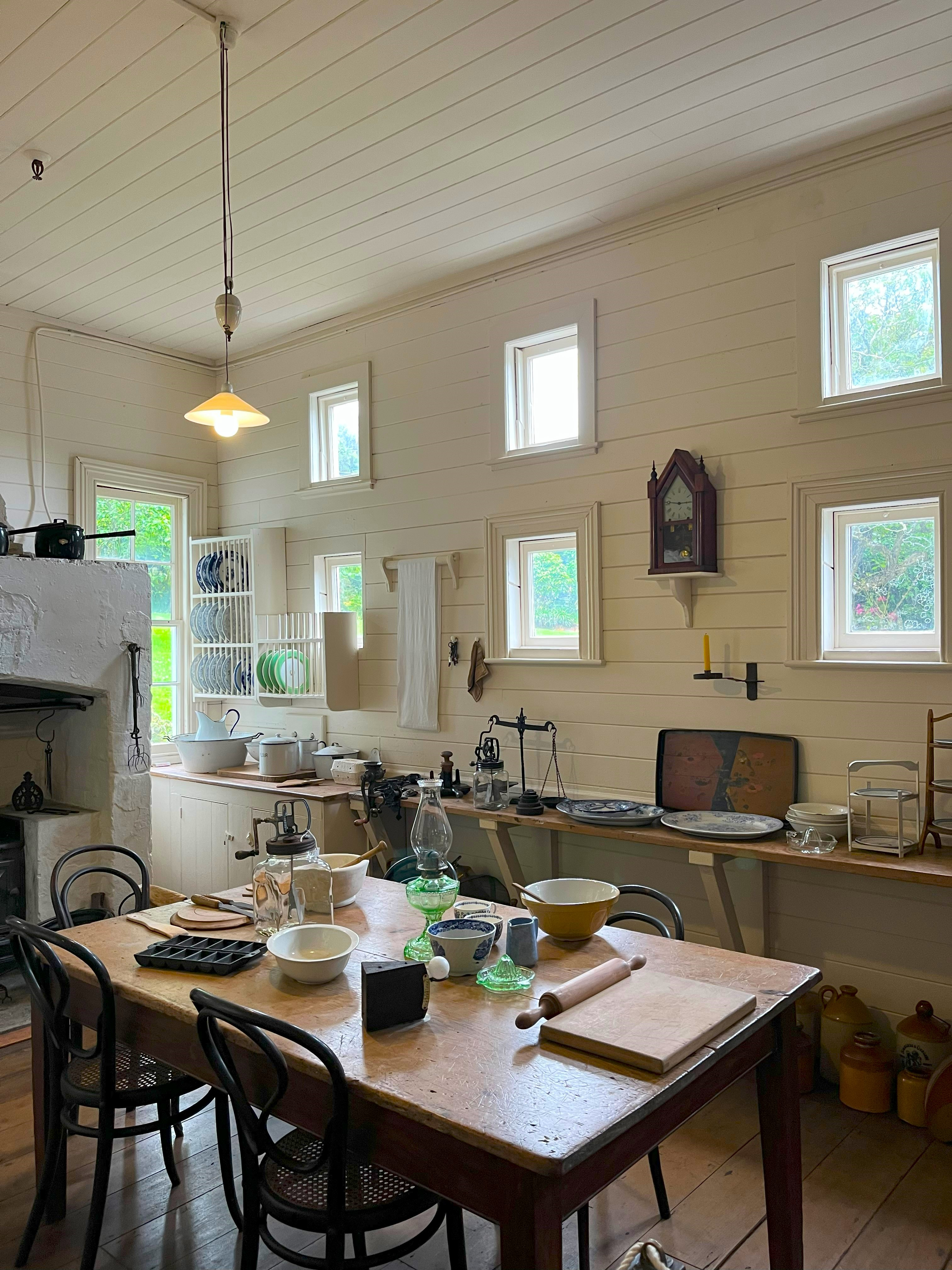
The kitchen

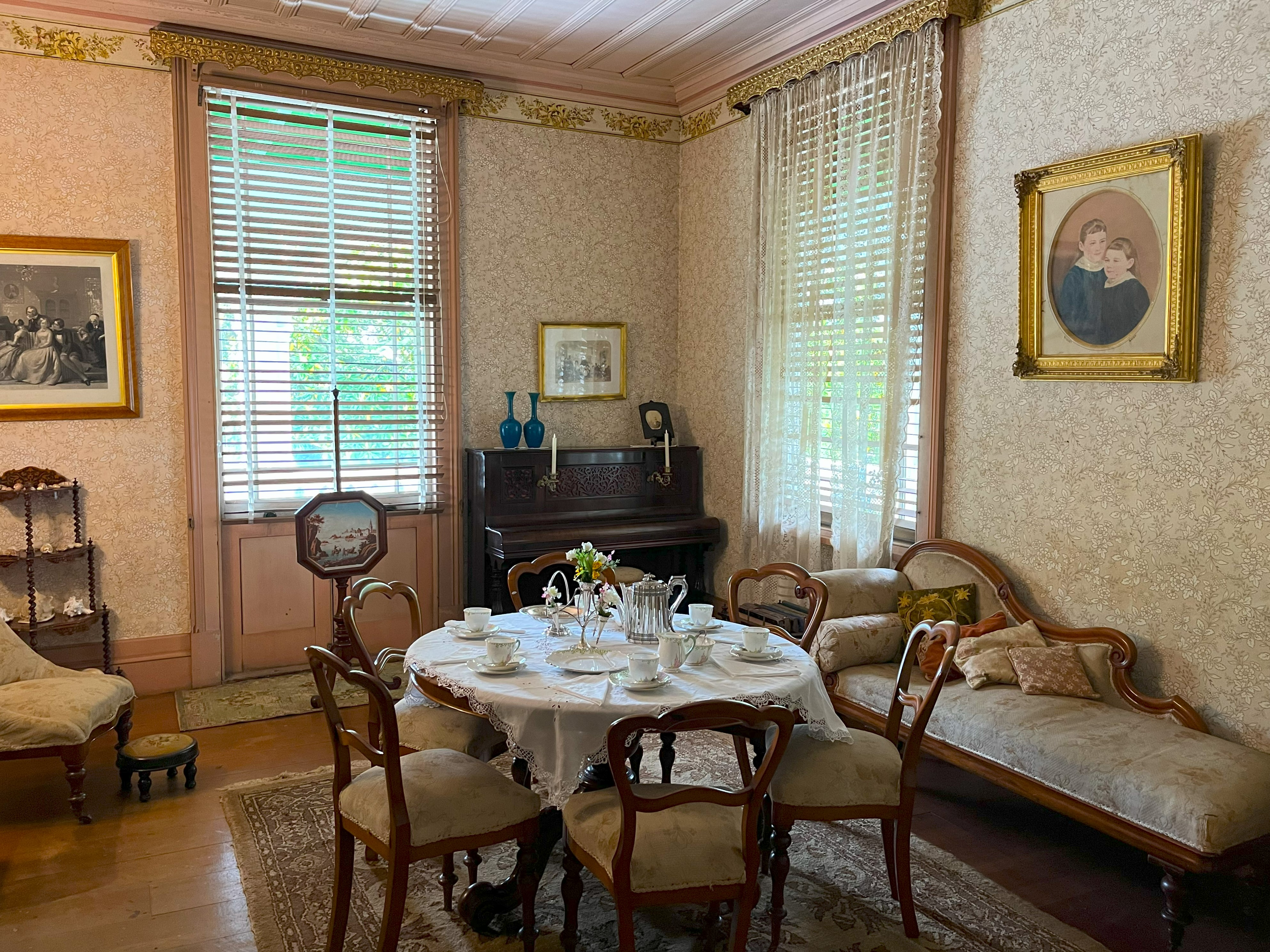
The drawing room

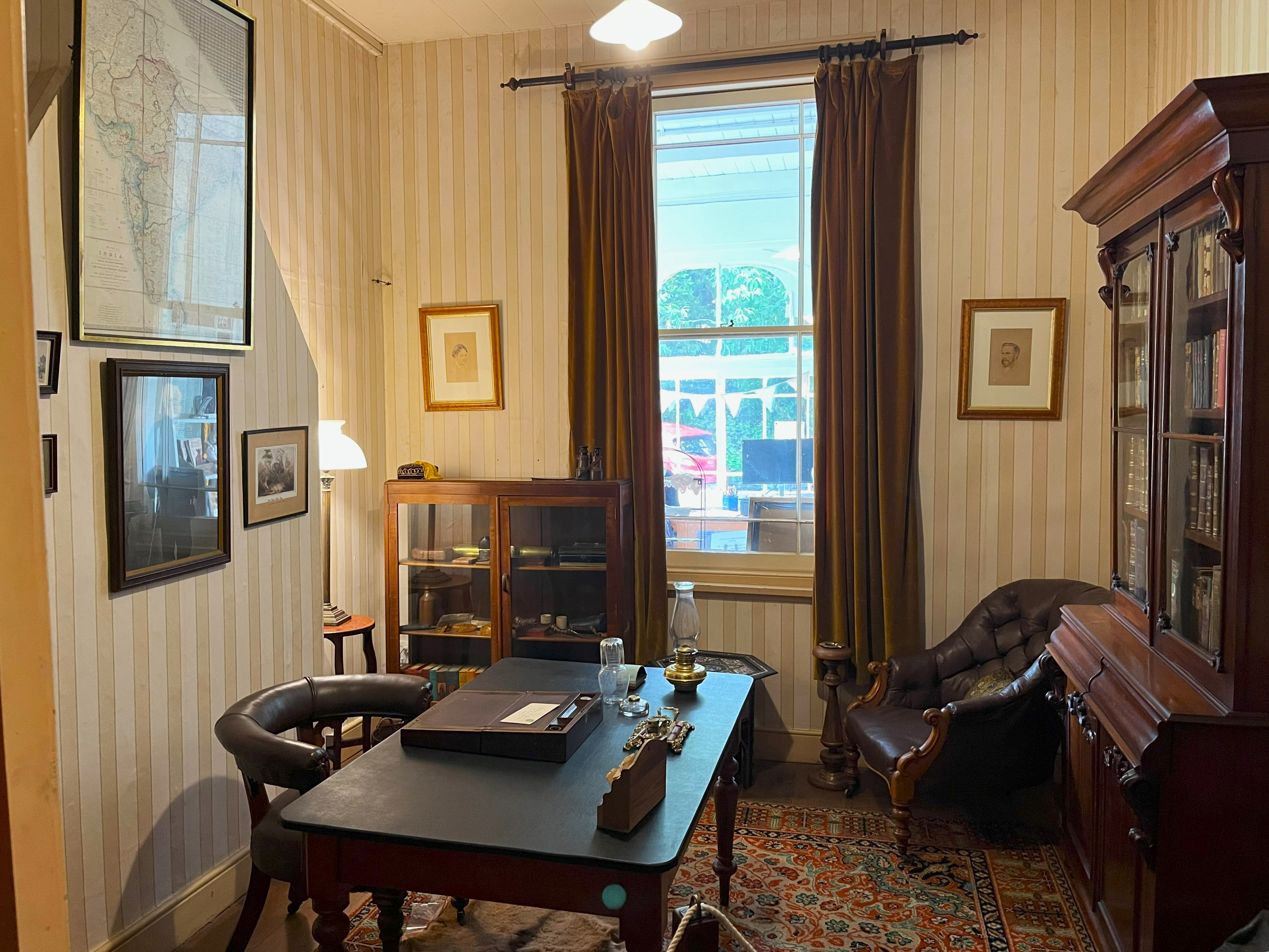
The study

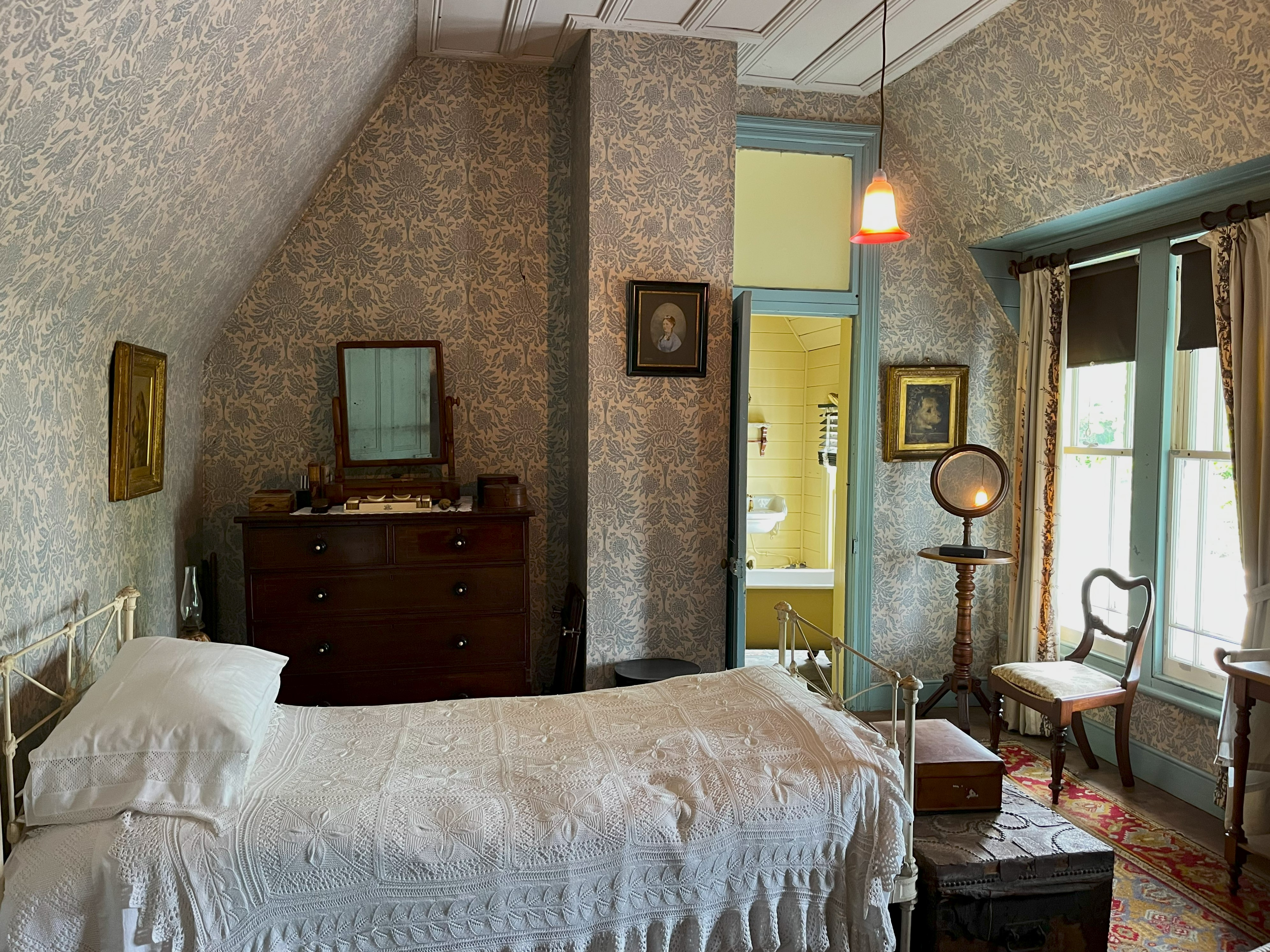
The dressing room

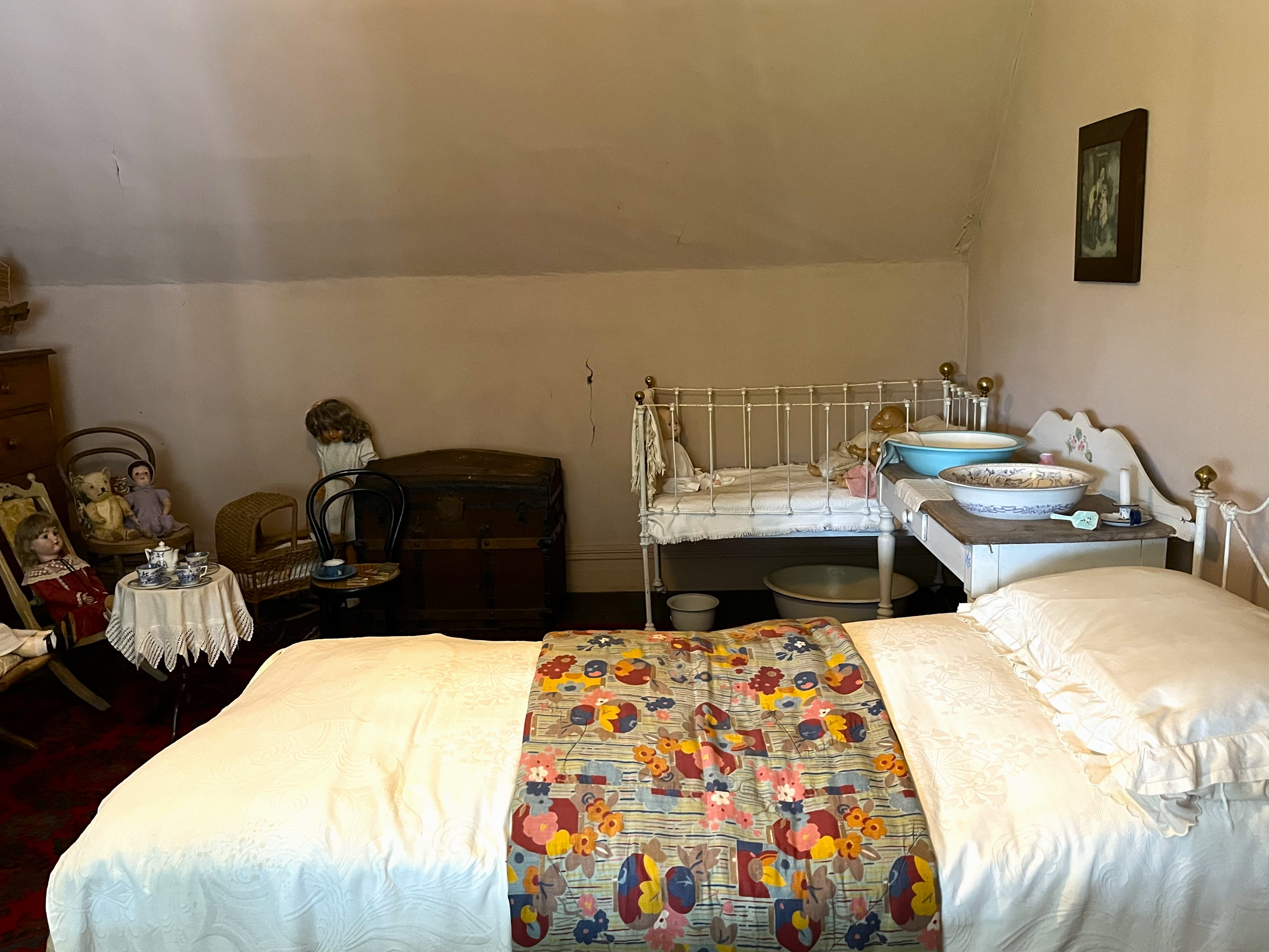
The nursery

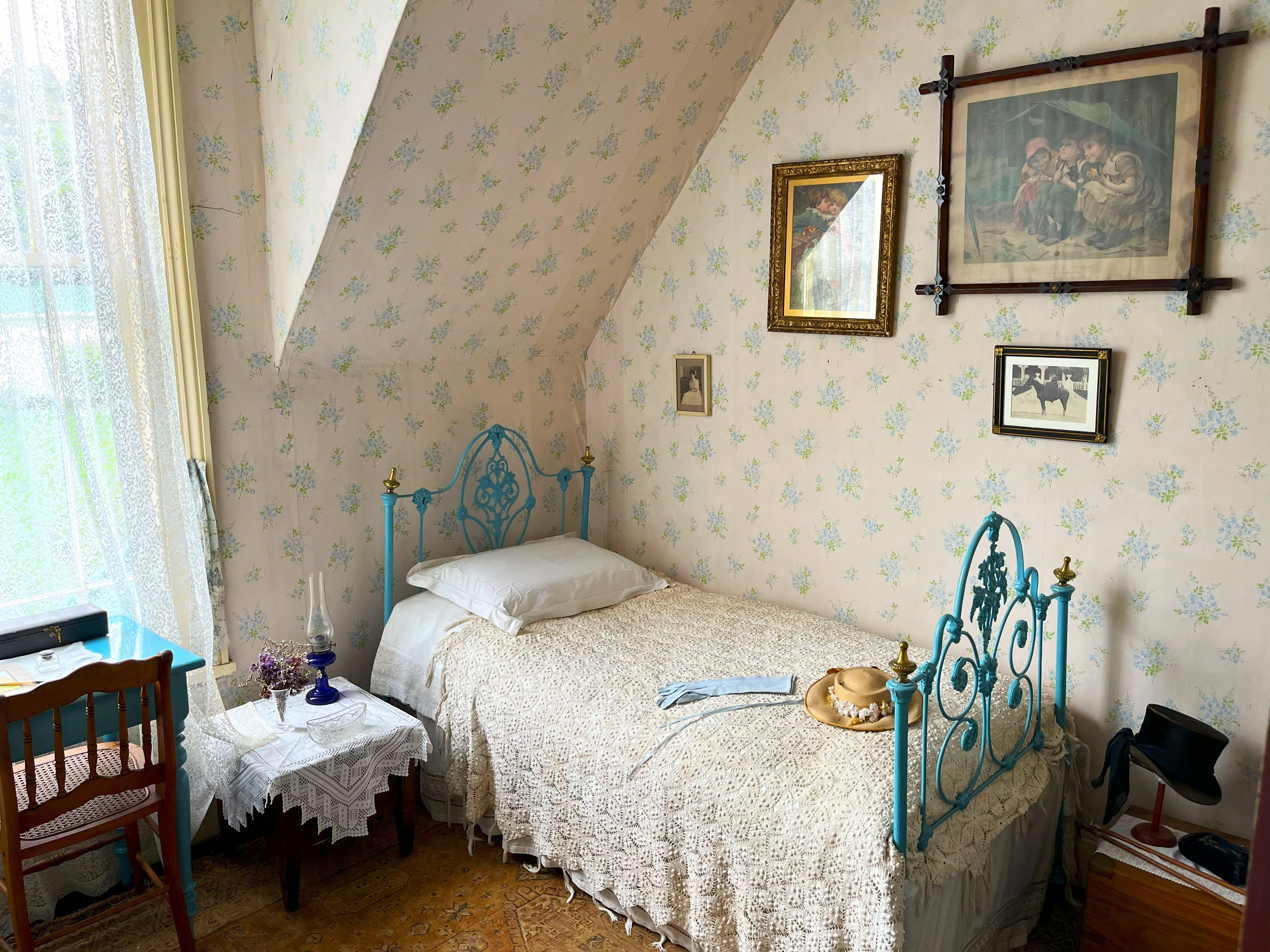
The blue bedroom

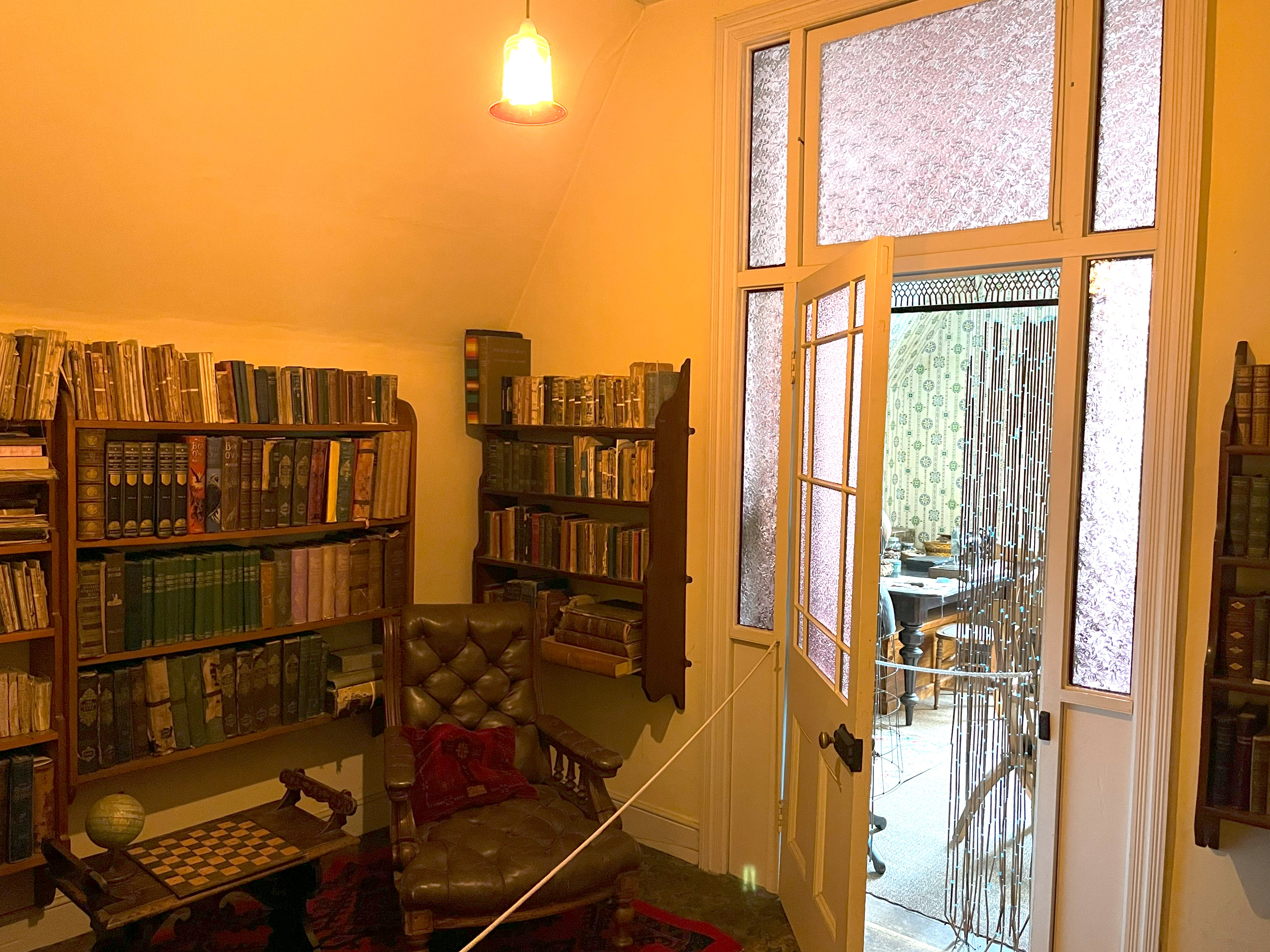
The library

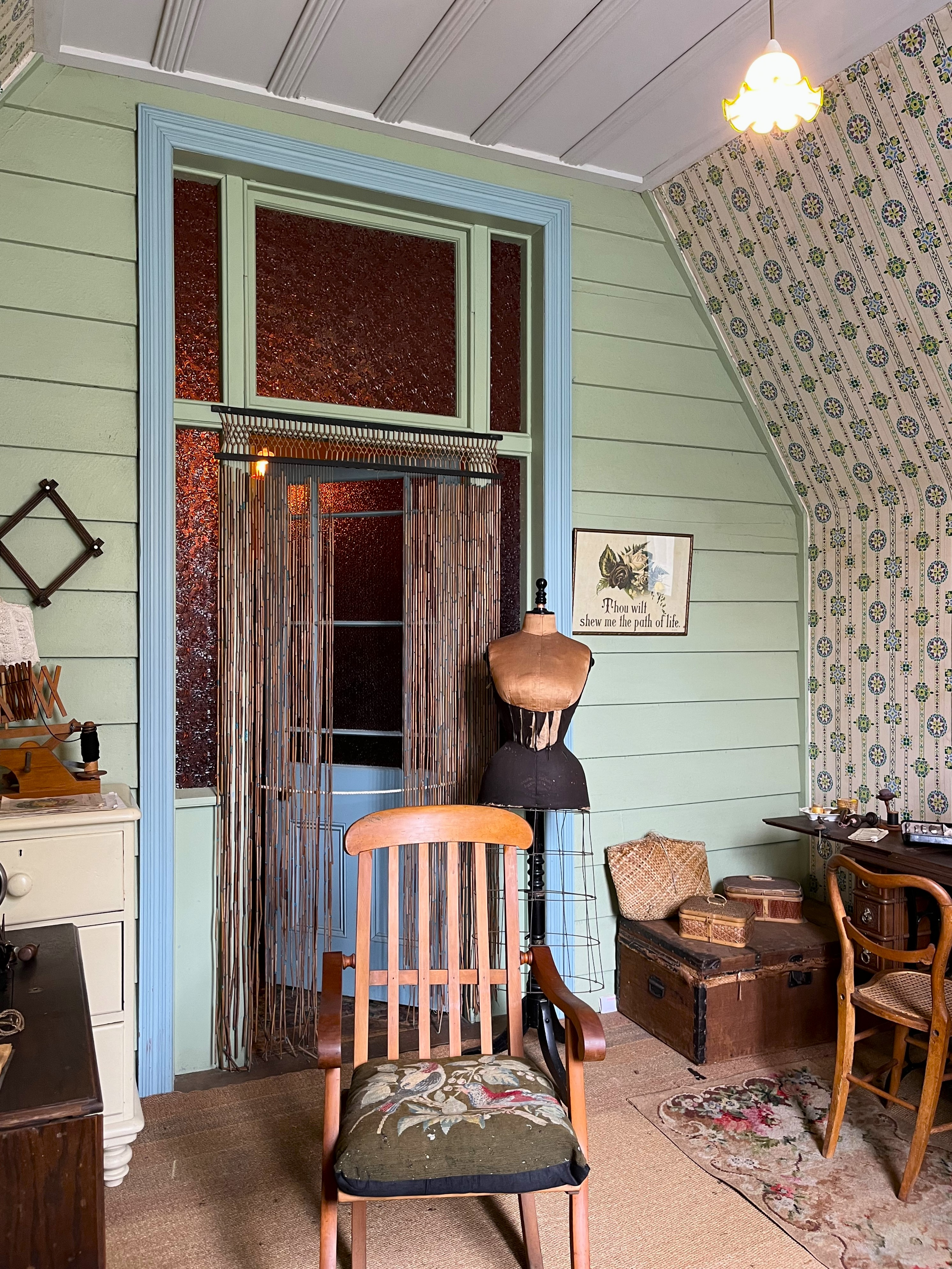
The sewing room

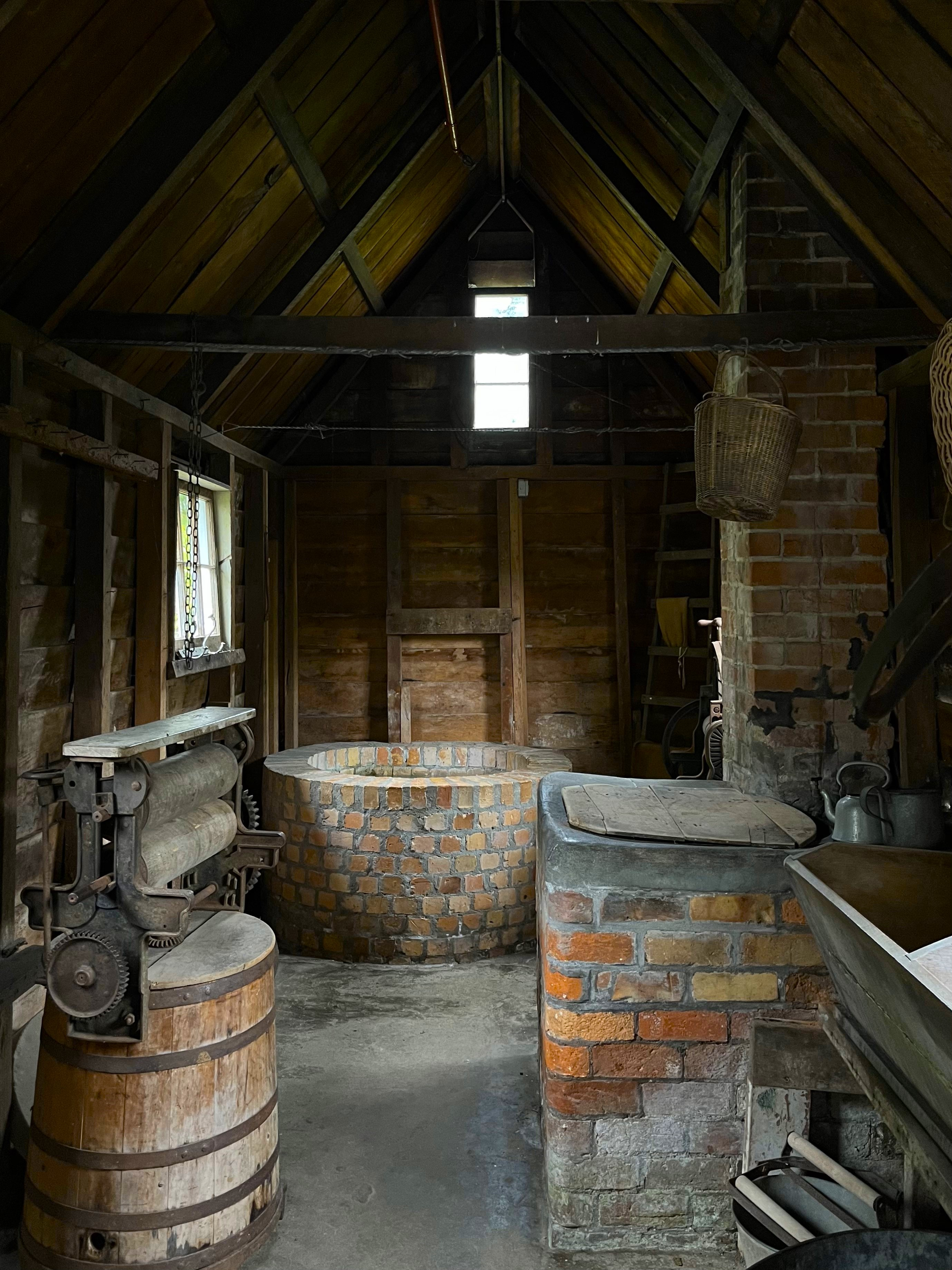
The washhouse and dairy, featuring an 8 metre well

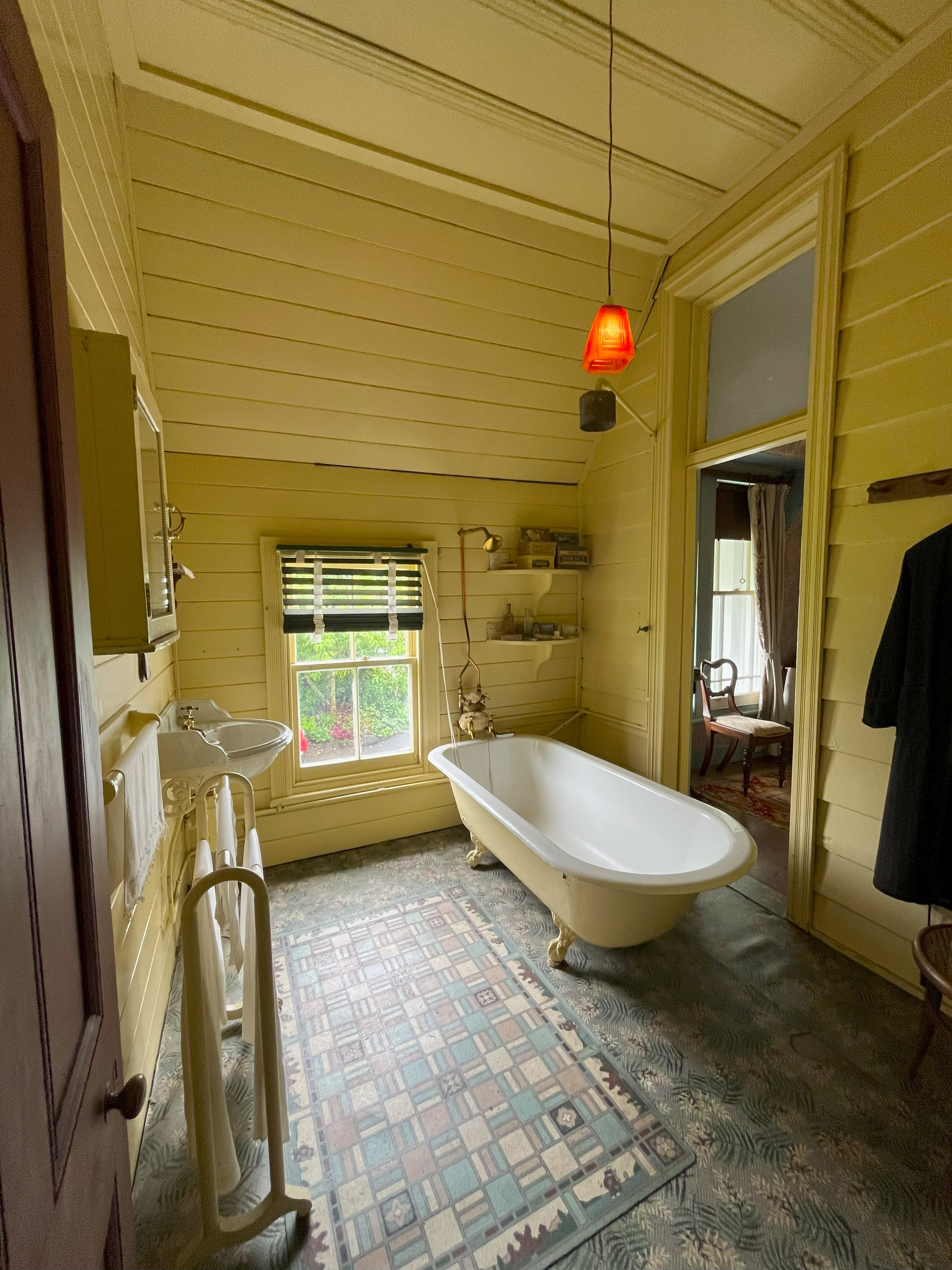
The bathroom, adjacent to the master bedroom

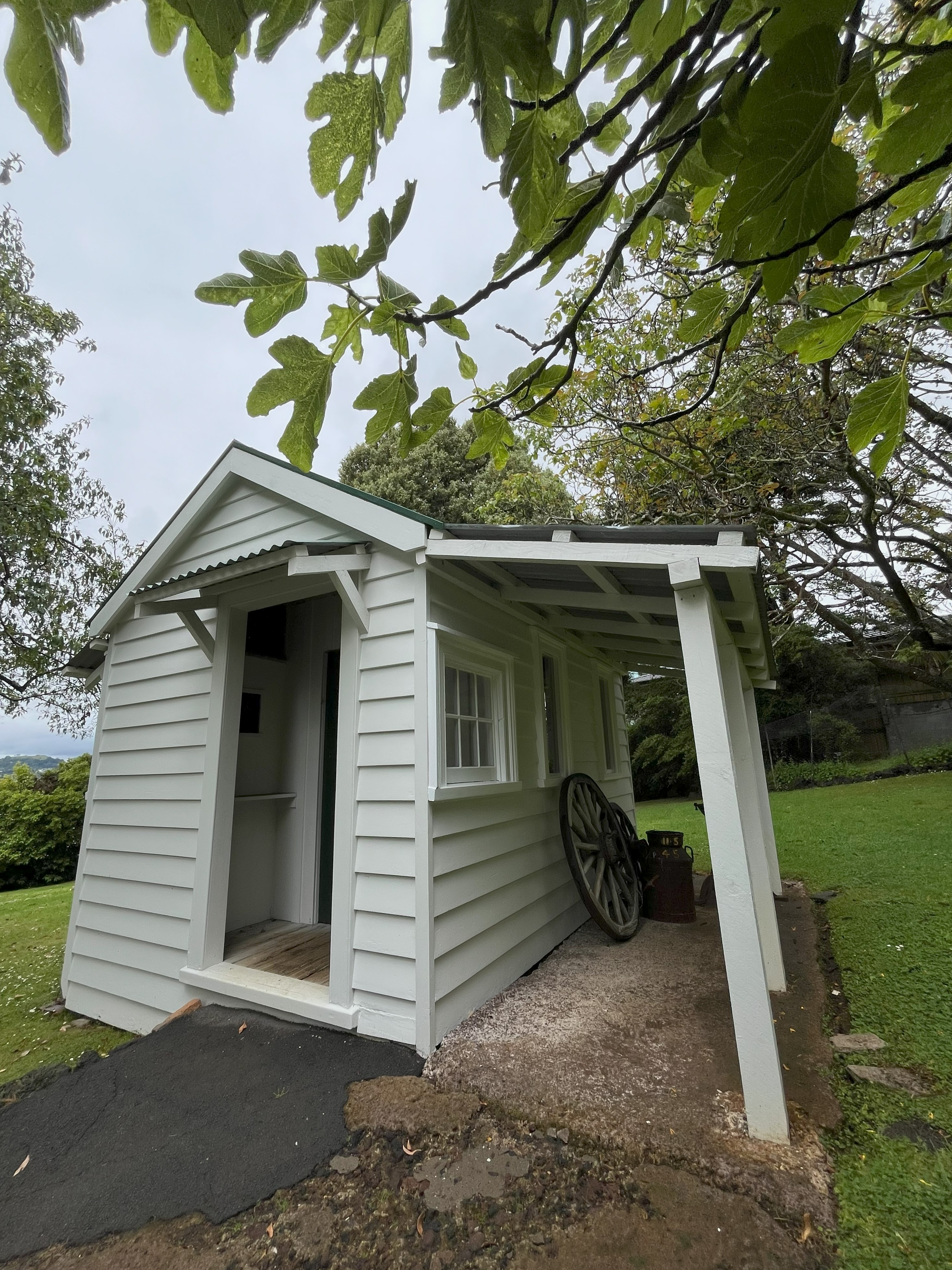
Outside storage

== The Kerr Taylor family ==
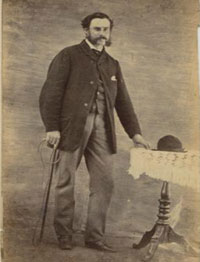
Allan Kerr Taylor

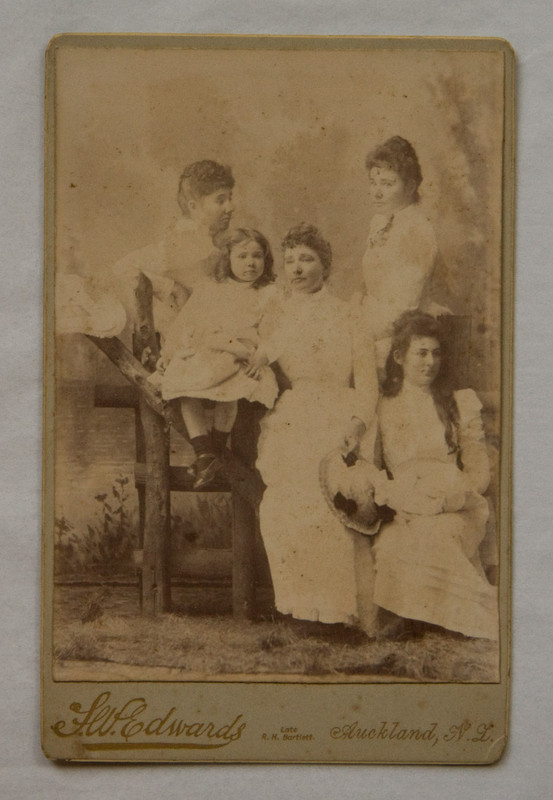
Sophia Taylor with four of her children

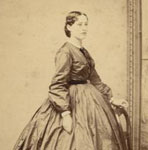
Sophia Taylor

Allan and Sophia married on 6 June 1865, when Sophia was 17 years old, and Allan was 33 years old. Initially, their income came from farming but later turned to land sales and company investments. Allan Kerr Taylor enhanced his social status through the various groups and associations that he was a part of. He was a member of the Provincial Council and General Assembly. He was also a director of the Bank of New Zealand and the Loan and Mercantile Company and held the title of President of the Auckland Racing Club for a year prior to his death.

As well as being a Sunday School teacher at St Luke's Church Sophia Taylor was also a member of the choir along with some of her daughters, and they performed plays and concerts for the local community. After her husbands death, Sophia Taylor joined the Auckland branch of the Women's Franchise League, persistently advocating for women's suffrage. Taylor supported suffrage for practical reasons, such as women’s obligation to obey laws and pay taxes, but did not believe women should serve in Parliament. She was also involved with the Women's Christian Temperance Union, focusing on its franchise work despite opposing prohibition. She backed the Auckland Tailoresses' Union but likely would not have supported unions for domestic servants.

Three of her daughters remained unmarried their whole lives, and after the First World War, Sophia Taylor continued to live at Alberton with them. The house continued to be run by these four women, and they continued the legacy of hospitality to their neighbours, albeit at a smaller scale to the parties they held at the end of the 19th century. The youngest daughter, Muriel Kerr Taylor, was only three years old when her father died. Thus, she spent her life surrounded by her mother and sisters, who were all part of the NZ women's suffrage movement. Not only did Muriel bequeath the house to the National Historic Places Trust, but she also set up the Kerr Taylor Foundation in the 1970s. The original purpose of the Foundation was to provide housing for elderly members of the community, but it has grown into a service for Mount Albert members in need of financial support to access grants for individual or group needs. She contributed $30,000 to establish the Foundation.

== Legacy & importance ==
Alberton is now a public community space that holds events open to the community, hosting annual vintage and antique markets on the grounds, or high teas held in a manner similar to how the women of Mount Albert would have hosted guests in these spaces.

== Bibliography ==
- Dunsford, Deborah (2016). Mt Albert Then and Now: a History of Mt Albert, Morningside, Kingsland, St Lukes, Sandringham and Owairaka. Auckland: Mount Albert Historical Society. ISBN 978-0-473-36016-0. OCLC 964695277. Wikidata Q117189974.
