= Taurere / Taylor Hill =

Volcano in Auckland, New Zealand

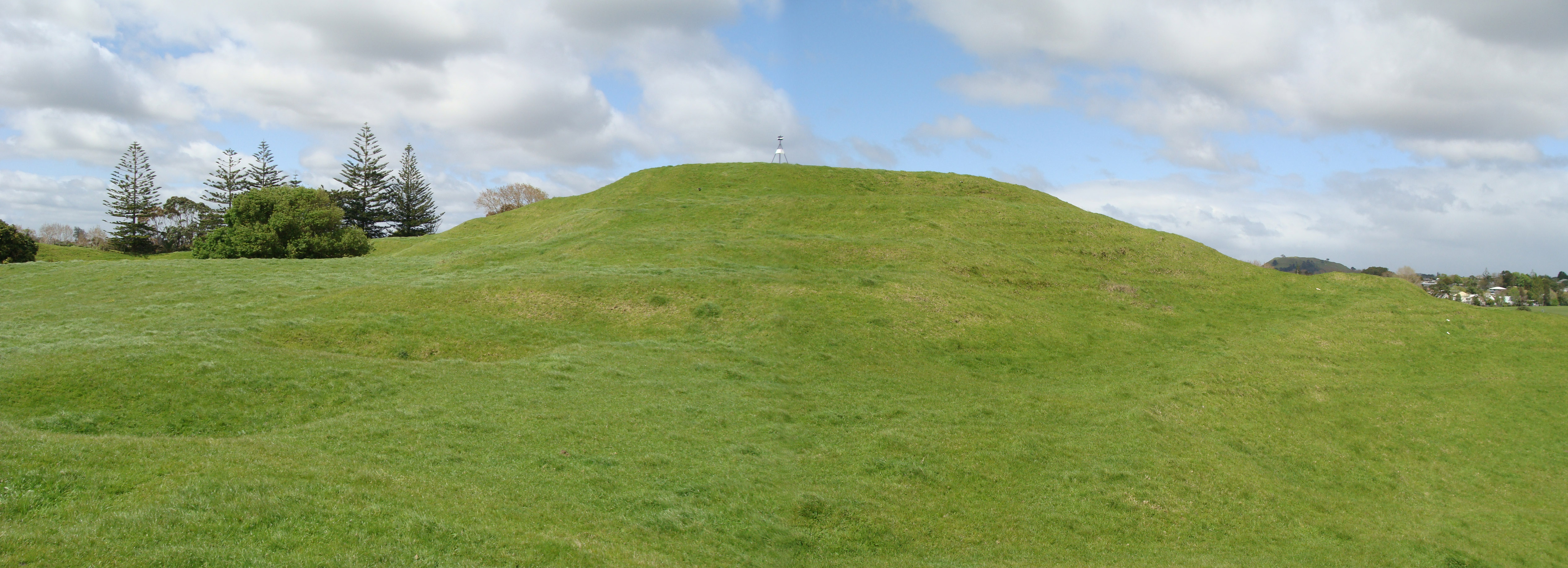
- Scoria cone of Taylors Hill with Māori kūmara pits in left foreground

Highest point
- Elevation: 57 m (187 ft)
- Coordinates: 36.86422°S 174.86994°E

Naming
- Etymology: Dual name referencing the daughter of the Tainui chief Te Keteanataua and for William Taylor
- Defining authority: New Zealand Geographic Board

Geography
- Country: New Zealand
- Region: Auckland
- Suburb: Glendowie
- Topo map: Land Information New Zealand NZTopo50-BA32 667185

Geology
- Formed by: Volcanic activity
- Mountain type: Scoria cone
- Volcanic field: Auckland volcanic field
- Last eruption: 33,000 years ago

Taurere / Taylor Hill is a volcano in the Auckland volcanic field. It erupted about 33,000 years ago. Its scoria cone reaches 57 m (187 ft) high.

It was the site of a Māori pā (fortification), and retains earthworks from that era such as kūmara (sweet potato) pits and terracing. It was most likely first occupied in 1400s, and was an area where ōnewa (greywacke) was quarried to make toki (stone adzes).

Waiorohe (Karaka Bay) was a mooring site of Tainui waka inside the west heads of the Tāmaki. From here Horoiwi left the waka and settled with the Tangata whenua at Te Pane o Horoiwi. Te Keteanataua and Taihaua disembarked and made their way to Taurere, whilst Taikehu and others went on by foot to explore the upper reaches of the river and the shores of the Manukau Harbour. The Karaka trees of the bay descend from the sacred Karaka grove Te Uru-Karaka a Parehuia of Taurere Pa.

Until the 18th century the area around Taylors Hill was the traditional eastern boundary for Waiohua lands, After the pā was attacked by Ngāti Whātua around the year 1750, Waiohua retreated to South Auckland. Ngāti Whātua gifted the land to Ngāti Pāoa in the late 1700s.

The volcano is named for William Taylor, who purchased the land in 1845. The volcano's lower slopes and scoria mounds to the east and south were quarried away following European settlement, with only the north-west section of the volcanic area remaining. The area around the volcanic cone became a public reserve in the 1920s.

== Geology ==
It is a basaltic monogenetic volcano with central scoria cones, that formed last in the eruptive sequence, lava flows directed to the north-east and west, and tuff deposits for perhaps 500 m (1,600 ft) from the central cone from an initial phreatomagmatic eruption. While now on the eastern shore of the tidal Tāmaki River, this is due to postglacial sea-level rise after its eruption inland between 32 and 34,000 years ago which can be timed fairly accurately because of its distinctive palaeomagnetic characteristics. Within the tuff ring have been found distinctive lithic clasts that are evidence that the erupted magma traversed the eastern border of the ophiolitic Dun Mountain–Maitai terrane.
