= C3H5NO4 =

The molecular formula C_{3}H_{5}NO_{4} (molar mass: 119.08 g/mol, exact mass: 119.0219 u) may refer to:

- Hadacidin
- β-Nitropropionic acid, or 3-nitropropanoic acid
