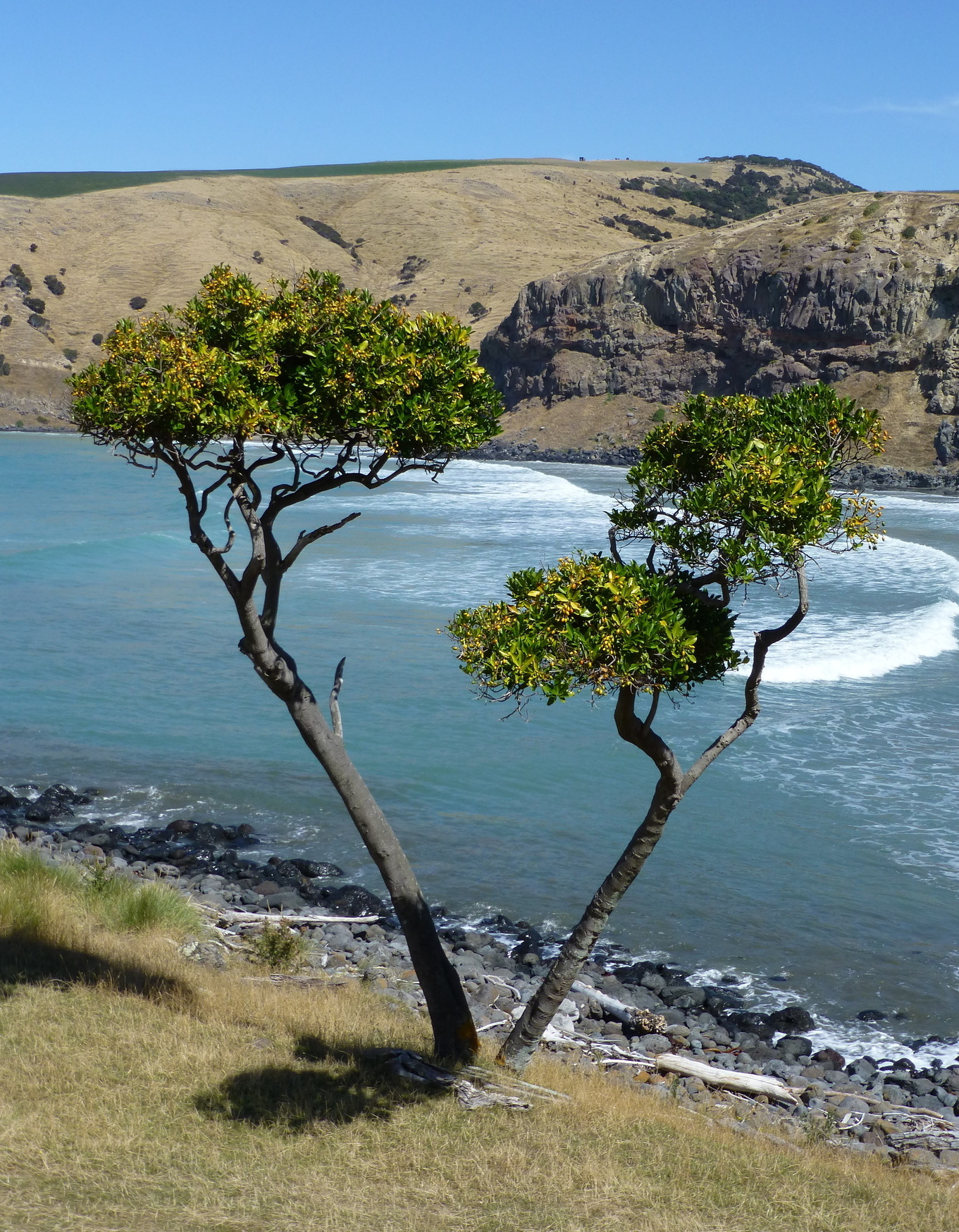
- C. laevigatus in Raupo Bay, Banks Peninsula, in the Canterbury Region

Conservation status
- Not Threatened (NZ TCS)

Scientific classification
- Kingdom: Plantae
- Clade: Tracheophytes
- Clade: Angiosperms
- Clade: Eudicots
- Clade: Rosids
- Order: Cucurbitales
- Family: Corynocarpaceae
- Genus: Corynocarpus
- Species: C. laevigatus

Binomial name
- Corynocarpus laevigatus J.R.Forst. & G.Forst., 1776
- Range in New Zealand.

= Corynocarpus laevigatus =

Species of flowering plant

Corynocarpus laevigatus, commonly known as karaka or the New Zealand laurel, is an evergreen tree in the family Corynocarpaceae. It is endemic to New Zealand and is common throughout the North Island and less common in the South Island. C. laevigatus individuals are also found on the Chatham Islands, Kermadec Islands, and the Three Kings Islands. C. laevigatus is mainly a coastal tree, although in the North Island, it is also found inland.

Corynocarpus laevigatus was first described in 1776 by the German naturalists Georg and Johann Reinhold Forster. C. laevigatus grows to heights of up to 15–20 metres (50–70 feet) and has a trunk of up to 60 centimetres (20 inches) in diameter. Its leaves are leathery, dark to bright green in colour and up to 15–30 cm (6–10 in) long. C. laevigatus produces large oval-shaped orange-coloured fruits. C. laevigatus seeds are highly toxic to humans and contain poisonous toxins and other glucosides. The fruits are a valuable food source for the kererū and the Chatham Islands pigeon. C. laevigatus has been introduced to the United States for reforestation purposes; it is naturalised and considered an invasive species on several Hawaiian islands and is mainly found on the island of Kauai.

It is considered a taonga (cultural treasure) amongst the Māori and Moriori peoples, who valued C. laevigatus for its drupes and seeds. On the Chatham Islands, depictions of Moriori ancestors were carved on to C. laevigatus trees (known as rākau momori) and are considered internationally significant and unique to their culture. An exoplanet originally named HD 137388 was renamed to "Karaka" in 2019 in recognition of the tree's orange-coloured fruit.

== Description ==
Corynocarpus laevigatus (karaka) is a medium-sized evergreen leafy canopy tree with erect spreading branches. It is endemic to New Zealand. It grows to heights of up to 15–20 metres (49–66 feet) and has a stout trunk usually up to 60 centimetres (24 inches) in diameter, but can be up to 1 metre (3 feet 3 inches) in diameter. The largest trunk of a C. laevigatus specimen diameter ever measured was 3 m (10 ft) in diameter. The bark is typically a grey colour, although on young trees it can be a lighter brown-colour. C. laevigatus is predominantly a coastal tree, although in the North Island, it can also be found in lowland inland forests. C. laevigatus is suggested to have a maximum lifespan of 500 years in mainland New Zealand, and potentially 600 years from a specimen found on Lady Alice Island.

Mature trees have dark-brown corrugated bark with corrugations that are broken up into pieces that are roughly 1 cm × 3 cm (0.4 in × 1.2 in) and 0.5 cm (0.2 in) thick. Younger trees have light brown bark that frequently has short, horizontal bands that resemble sewing stitches. C. laevigatus has alternating elliptic oval-shaped leaves that are up to 8 cm (3 in) wide, with petioles less than 2 cm (0.8 in) long.

From August to November, C. laevigatus produces large, stout, erect panicles of tiny greenish-yellow flowers, each less than 0.5 cm (0.2 in) in diameter. It starts flowering between August and November, and each panicle may have up to 100–200 flowers. Its sepals are rounded, and its petals are vaguely spathulate (spoon-shaped). Each panicle on an inflorescence (flower cluster) can be up to 200 mm long. The fruit C. laevigatus produces are oval-shaped and 30–40 mm (1.2–1.6 in) in length; with pale yellow–orange coloured flesh and a poisonous seed which is smooth and elliptic. The seed has an open system of fibrous veins on the yellowish surface. The fruit has a sickly sweet taste, reminiscent of apricots or dates. Its leaves are dark green in colour, paler green beneath, thick, leathery, and are vaguely obovate (egg-shaped) to oblong (rectangular) in character.

Corynocarpus laevigatus's wood anatomy prevents them from being dated using the conventional technique of counting annual growth rings in the trunk. C. laevigatus specimens planted in Palmerston North in 1962 grew to a height of 14 m (46 ft) in 42 years. The largest stem diameter measured 26.5 cm (10.4 in), and the trees grew 0.68 mm (0.027 in) per year. Other C. laevigatus trees grew at different rates; the largest C. laevigatus tree in mainland New Zealand was 500 years old with a diameter at breast height (DBH) of 212 cm (83 in) and a growth rate of 0.43 cm (0.17 in) per year. The fruits of C. laevigatus usually ripen between January and April and the seeds are mainly dispersed by two native columbiform birds. C. laevigatus has a diploid chromosome count of 46.

=== Phytochemistry ===
At least 11 compounds have been identified in C. laevigatus. A unique nitropropanoyl glucopyranose called 1,4,6-tri-(3-nitropropanoyl)-β-D-glucopyranose (corynocarpin) was first identified and extracted by a 1978 study published in Phytochemistry. A 2025 study examined the phytochemical screening of C. laevigatus extracts and found that the tree contains "significant amounts of phytochemicals".

== Gallery ==
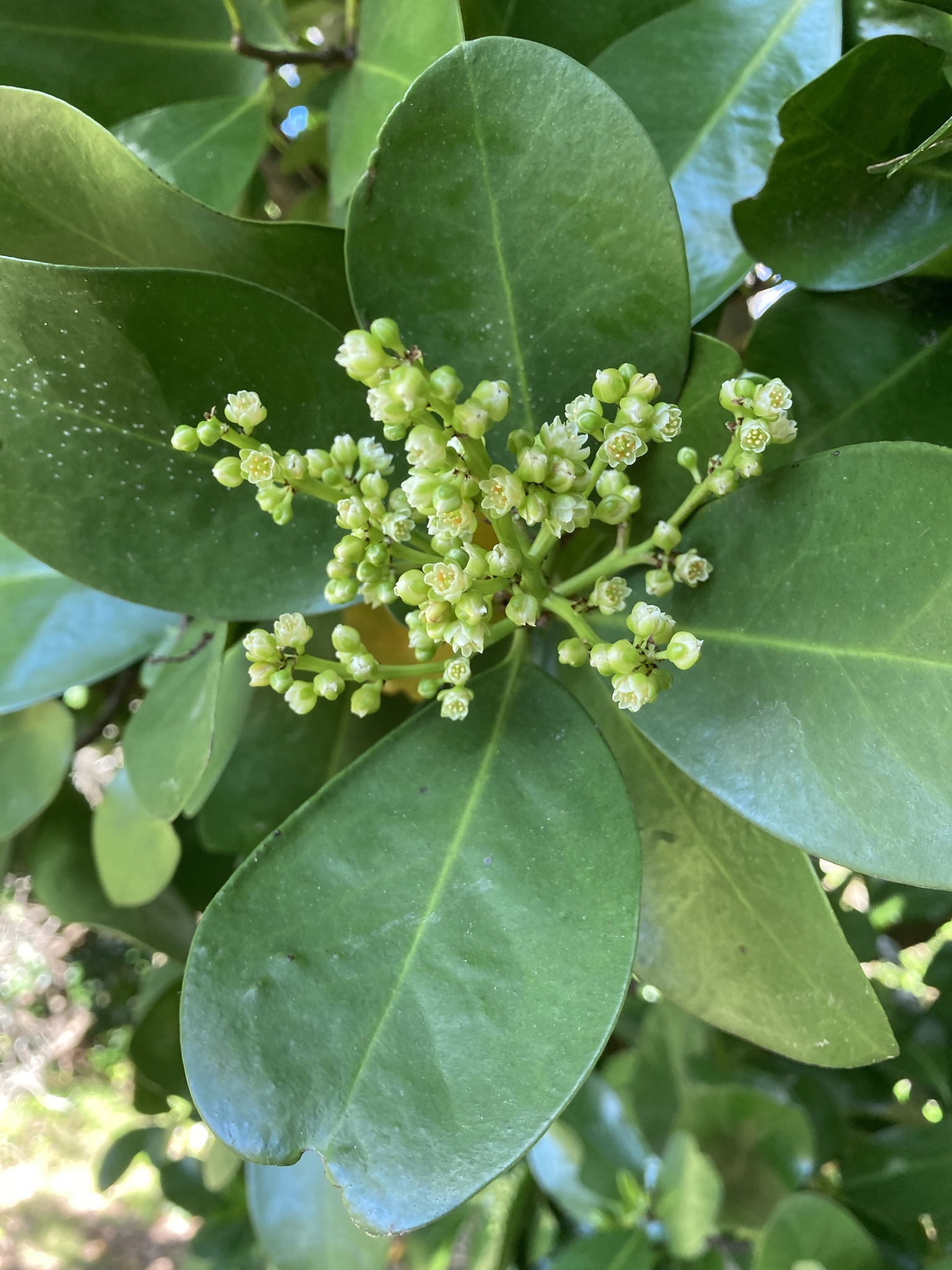
Close-up of C. laevigatus's greenish-yellow flower panicle and characteristic leathery, oval-shaped leaves.

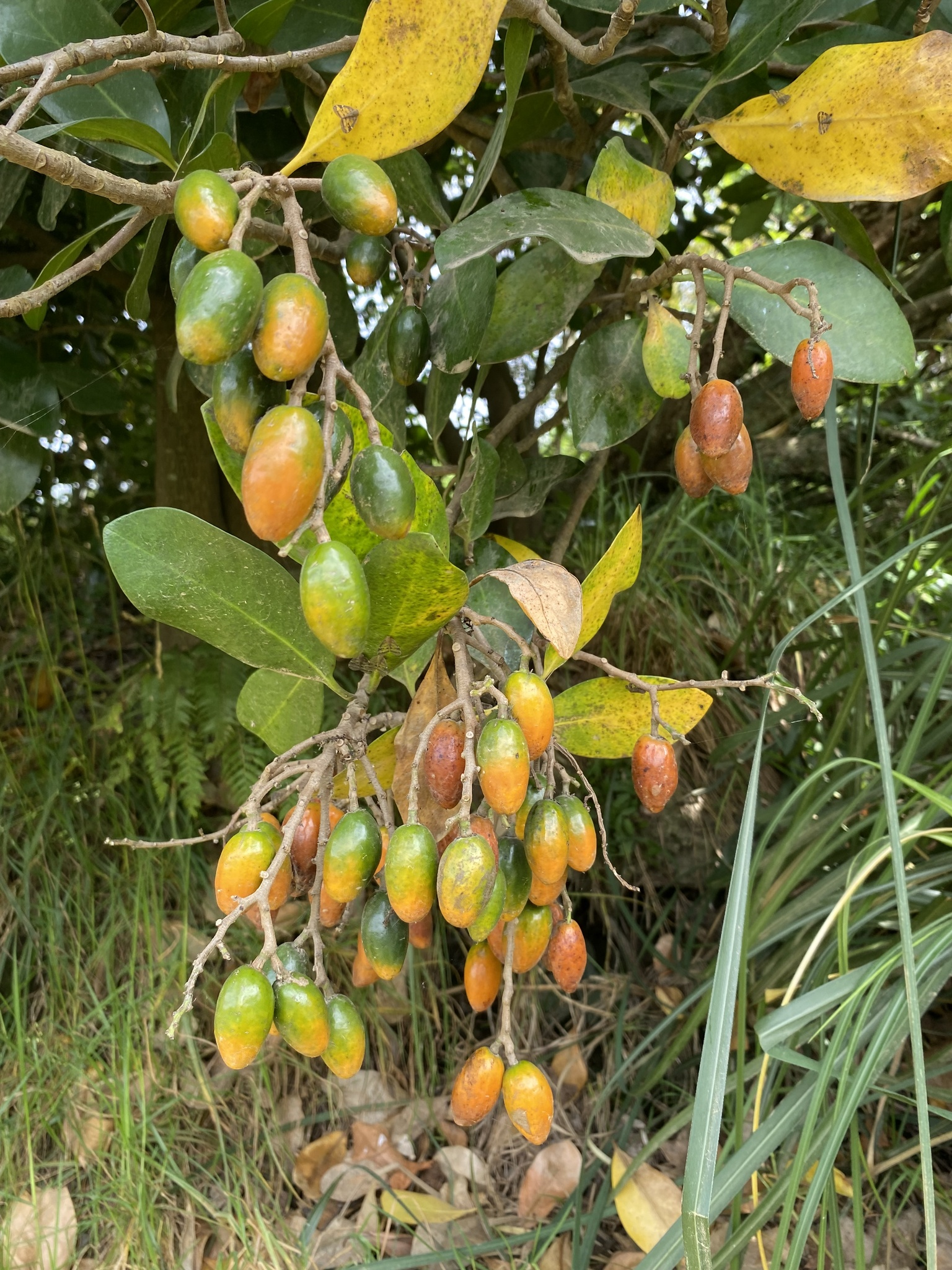
Clusters of C. laevigatus's fruit showing different ripening stages, from green to orange-yellow, hanging from branches with yellowing leaves.

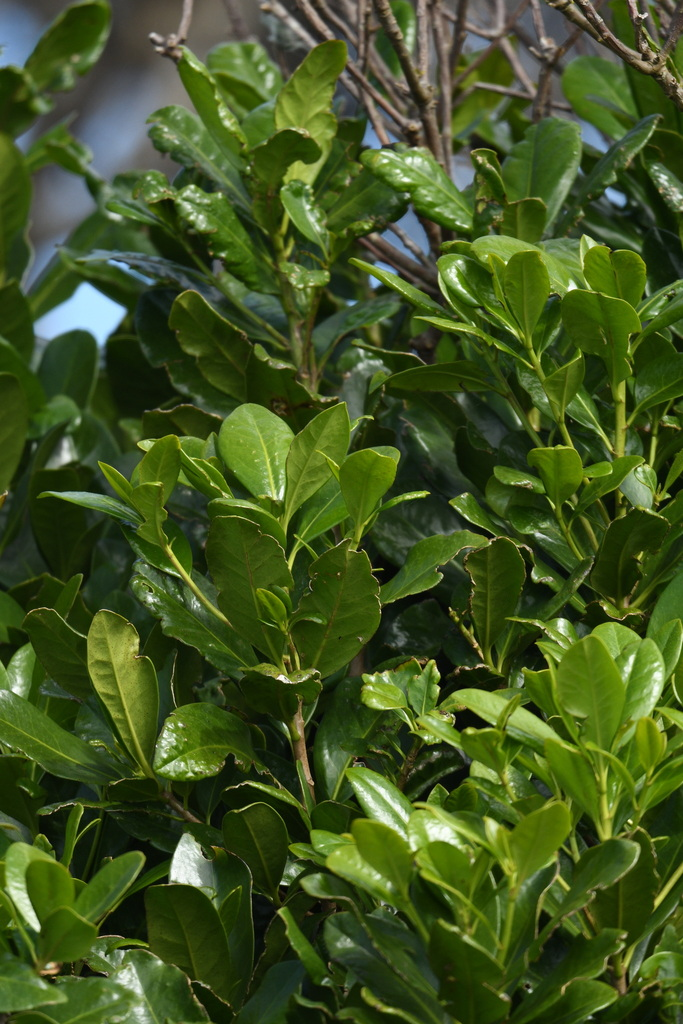
Dense foliage of a mature C. laevigatus specimen showing its characteristic branching pattern and dark green, glossy leaves.

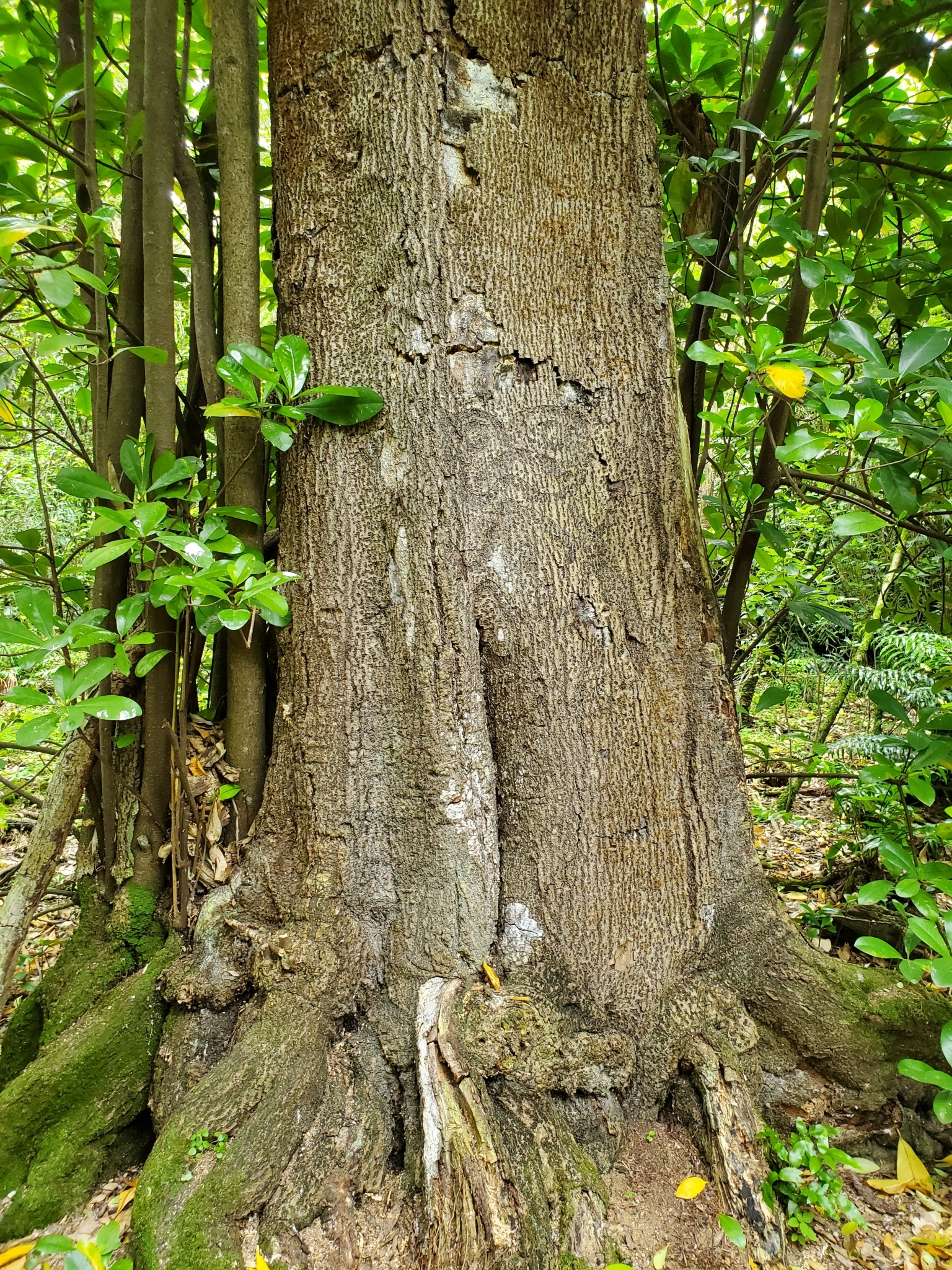
The trunk of a C. laevigatus specimen on Chatham Island; a Moriori dendroglyph can vaguely be seen in the centre of the trunk.

== Taxonomy ==
- Corynocarpaceae
  - - - C. rupestris
      - C. cribbianus
  - - C. laevigatus
    - C. similis
    - C. dissimilis

Cladogram showing the relationship of the species within the sole genus in the family Corynocarpaceae.

Corynocarpus laevigatus was first described by the German naturalists Johann Reinhold Forster and Georg Forster in 1776. Despite this, their description was incomplete, and the figures of the flowers were inaccurate. The species was first described from specimens collected by Johann Reinhold Forster and Georg Forster on the second voyage of James Cook. Joseph Banks and Daniel Solander, who were the botanists on the first voyage of James Cook, brought specimens of C. laevigatus to England, where they described and recorded it under the name Merretia lucida, although their work was never formally published.

Corynocarpus laevigatus is the only member of the family Corynocarpaceae found in New Zealand. The four other species in the genus grow across the Pacific Islands and Australia, including: (C. similis) in Vanuatu, (C. cribbianus) in the Solomon Islands, North Queensland and Vanuatu; (C. dissimilis) in New Caledonia; and (C. rupestris) in the Australian states of New South Wales and Queensland.

The Corynocarpus genus may have originated from a Paleotropical centre, then separated into two radiations into colder climates. In the first separation, C. cribbianus and C. rupestris were found in Australia through New Guinea, while in the second separation, C. dissimilis, C. similis, and C. laevigatus were found in New Caledonia, which led to New Zealand. Fossilised kernels from the genus Corynocarpus, from the early Miocene era, were found at Landslip Hill in the Southland Region. This discovery indicates that the genus has a long history in New Zealand. It is possible that the Corynocarpus genus spread from New Caledonia to New Zealand via land connections that existed in the mid-Tertiary era.

=== Etymology ===
The etymology (word origin) of the genus name Corynocarpus derives from the Greek koryne, meaning 'club', and carpus, meaning 'fruit', translating in English to 'club fruit'. The specific epithet (second part of the scientific name) originates from the Latin laevigatus meaning 'smooth', in reference either to the fruit, the leaves or the skin. The species is commonly known as karaka or the New Zealand laurel.

In the Māori language, karaka can either refer to the fruit of the tree or the tree itself. The word has origins in Proto-Polynesian languages. Cognates of karaka are used in Polynesian languages for members of the Planchonella genus, which share a similar appearance with Corynocarpus laevigatus. Karaka is also the Māori word for the colour orange, and has likely only been in use since the 19th century, as no word meaning orange appears in early Māori language dictionaries. In the Moriori language and on the Chatham Islands, both the tree and the fruit are known as kōpi. This name may share an etymology with Polynesian names used to describe members of the true ginger genus, Zingiber. In English, C. laevigatus is also commonly known as the "New Zealand laurel".

== Distribution ==
Corynocarpus laevigatus is found in large numbers throughout the North Island and South Island as far south as the Banks Peninsula on the east coast of the South Island and Greymouth, on the West Coast. It is also found on the Chatham Islands, Kermadec Islands, and the Three Kings Islands. It is possible that before Polynesian arrival in New Zealand, C. laevigatus was likely restricted to the far north of the North Island, despite its current range across offshore islands and the northern half of the South Island, which likely spread from Māori plantings. Populations are often found in association with former pā (Māori village) sites.

The species was not naturally present in the Otago and Southland Regions of New Zealand prior to human settlement. All individuals south of the Banks Peninsula are likely to be recent introductions. The distribution in Otago and Southland is naturally uncommon and scattered along the coastline. C. laevigatus's South Island population is exclusively located near coastal areas and most of the population is centred in the Banks Peninsula (including Christchurch's coastal areas) and the Marlborough Sounds. C. laevigatus has been introduced to the United States, it is naturalised and considered an invasive species in Hawaii, where it is naturalised in wet soils and considered a threat to endangered or rare species. C. laevigatus was introduced to Hawaii for reforestation purposes and was first naturalised to Kauai in 1891, and is still commonly found throughout the island. C. laevigatus is primarily naturalised on the island of Kauai, it is also found on the islands of Hawaii, Molokai, and Oahu. C. laevigatus is also found in Southern California.

== Ecology ==
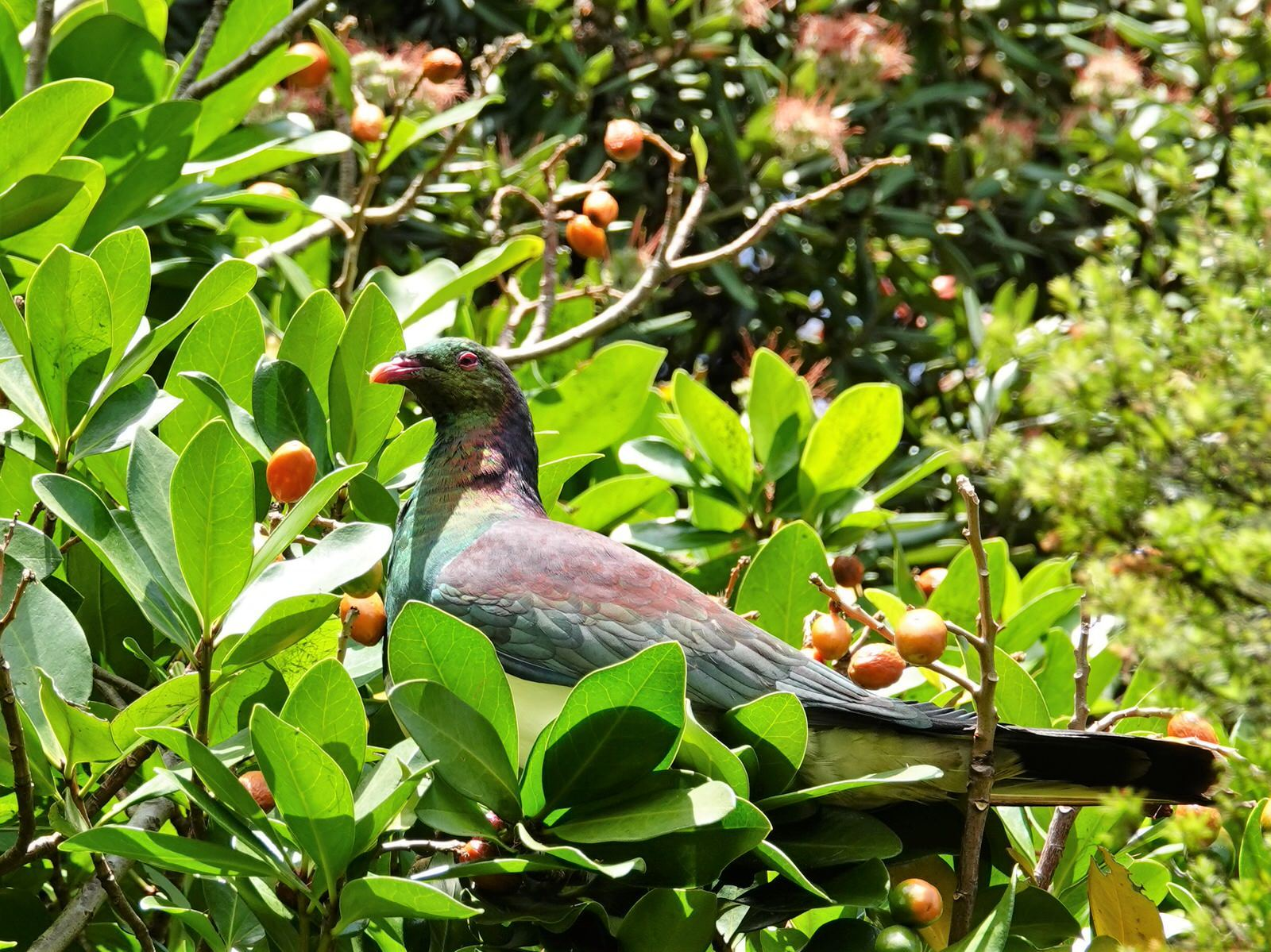
C. laevigatus's fruits are a valuable food source for the kererū

The fruits that C. laevigatus produces are a valuable food source for native New Zealand birds. The kererū (Hemiphaga novaeseelandiae) and the Chatham Islands pigeon (Hemiphaga chathamensis) are the only native bird species with a gape large enough to consume the fruits of C. laevigatus. Duvaucel's geckos (Hoplodactylus duvaucelii) have been reported eating the fruits of C. laevigatus.

The New Zealand bellbirds (Anthornis melanura) have been seen feeding on the sap from the bark of C. laevigatus. Other smaller native birds, such as the North Island robin (Petroica longipes), silvereye (Zosterops lateralis) and whiteheads (Mohoua albicilla) are known to search around C. laevigatus for insects.

The endocarps of C. laevigatus are sometimes nibbled by Polynesian rat (Rattus exulans), while the larger brown rats (Rattus norvegicus) sometimes chew through the endocarps. Both species consume the flesh of C. laevigatus. Possums, an invasive species in New Zealand, consume the flesh of C. laevigatus fruits. The extinct moa and other large birds likely consumed the fruits of C. laevigatus centuries ago. C. laevigatus plays host to the endemic New Zealand beetle species Oemona hirta. C. laevigatus is one of New Zealand's least flammable tree species with the highest moisture contents and lowest flammability rates, as examined in a 2016 study.

== Relationship with humans ==
=== Cultivation ===
Corynocarpus laevigatus is common in cultivation and widely available for sale both in New Zealand and elsewhere in the world. It was one of the most grown food crops by pre-European Māori (alongside kūmara and aruhe); they ate the drupe and seed after a long detoxification process. C. laevigatus's seeds contain highly toxic glucosides of 3-nitropropionic acid, such as karakin. Some initial symptoms of poisoning include diarrhoea, nausea and restlessness which develop to more severe gastrointestinal and neurological problems.

Every autumn, pre-colonisation Māori could collect the seeds dropped from C. laevigatus trees. The seeds could be placed in open-weaved traditional baskets (kete), washed in water to remove the outer pulp and baked and sun dried, a process that would remove toxicity from the seeds.

=== In Māori culture ===
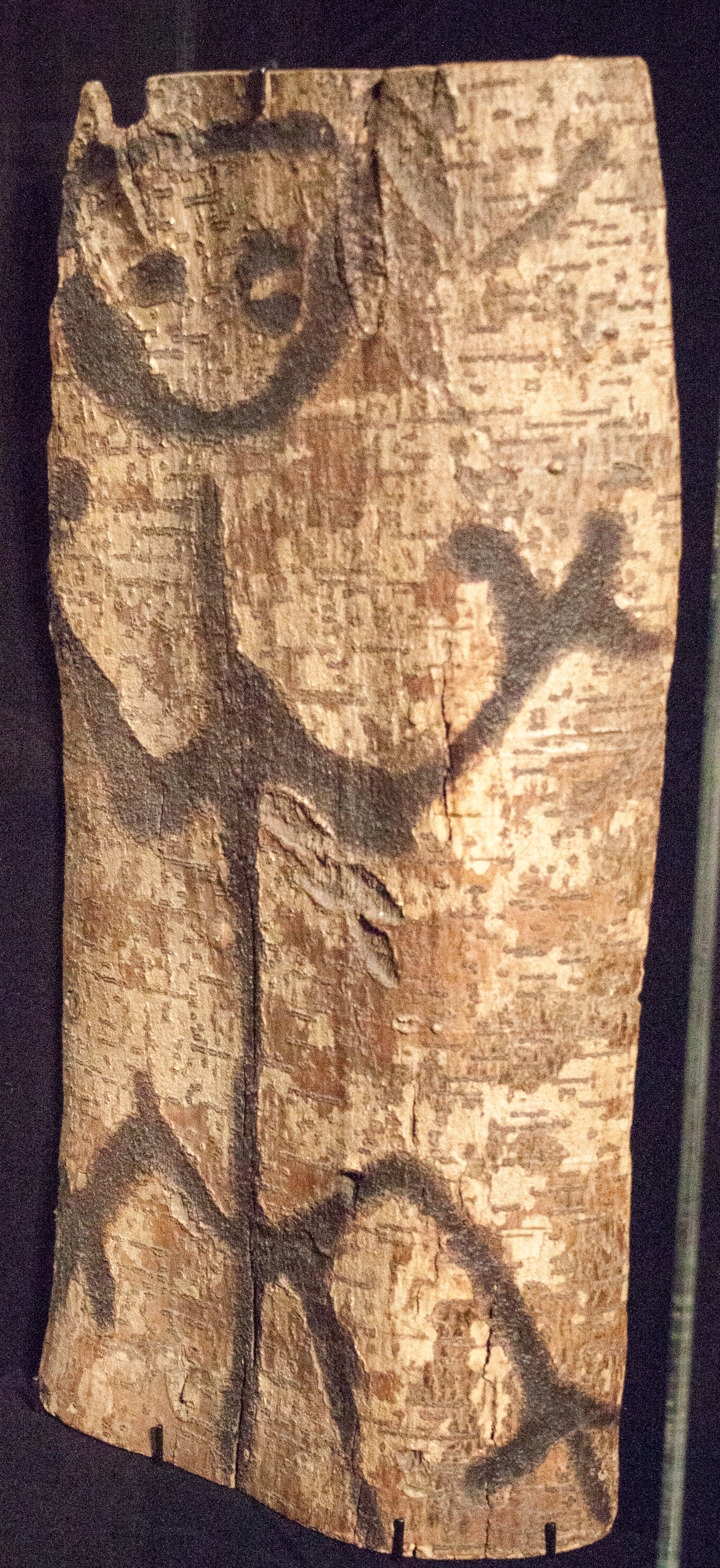
A Moriori kōpi tree carving (rākau momori) in the Canterbury Museum

Corynocarpus laevigatus is of great importance to Māori, who primarily used it as a food source. In Māori mythology, C. laevigatus is told to be from Hawaiki, an ancestral homeland for the Māori people. While pre-European Māori primarily valued C. laevigatus for its nutrition rather than medicine, they did use leaf undersides to draw out infections and fresh upper surfaces to heal injured skin. The seeds of C. laevigatus were of great value to Māori and needed to be prepared before they could be safely consumed, while the flesh of the fruits was consumed uncooked. The seeds are very poisonous and bitter in taste which had to be steamed in earth ovens (umu). C. laevigatus's timber was also used in constructing canoes (waka).

=== In Moriori culture ===
On the Chatham Islands, C. laevigatus have played a distinguished role in the history of the indigenous Moriori peoples; the bark of the C. laevigatus trees has been notably used for carving dendroglyphs rather than a food source. A 2000 Department of Conservation report documented 147 C. laevigatus specimens with dendroglyphs on the Chatham Islands, although not all carvings were confirmed as authentically Moriori.

Corynocarpus laevigatus (or kōpi in Moriori) is considered a taonga (cultural treasure) amongst the Māori and Moriori peoples. Moriori also utilised C. laevigatus trees by carving on them; known as rākau momori in the Moriori language, the carvings typically depict Moriori ancestors and are considered internationally significant and unique to their culture. A rāhui protects the remaining carved trees due to their fragile state. C. laevigatus timber was also utilised by the Moriori to smoke and preserve food.

=== Poisonings ===
Corynocarpus laevigatus has been linked to dog poisonings in New Zealand, leading to calls for the plant to be removed from urban areas.

=== Recognition ===
An exoplanet originally named HD 137388 was renamed to "Karaka" in 2019 in honour of the tree's orange fruit. A small community 20 km (12 mi) west of Whanganui named Pākaraka is named in honour of the tree and its name reflects the "abundance of karaka trees" that previously were situated there. Karaka Bay, east of Auckland Central, in the suburb of Glendowie, is also named in honour of the tree. There are three other bays in New Zealand that are named "Karaka". Additionally, a locality in South Auckland, approximately 40 km (25 mi) from Auckland Central is also named in honour of the tree. New Zealand Post recognised C. laevigatus in 1960 by featuring it on penny postage stamps.

== See also ==
- List of trees native to New Zealand

== Works cited ==
Books

- Cheeseman, T. F. (1906). Manual of the New Zealand flora (1 ed.). Wellington, New Zealand: New Zealand Board of Science and Art – via the Internet Archive.
- Jopson, Fraser W.; McKibbin, Craig R. (2000). Moriori Tree Carvings, Chatham Islands (PDF). Vol. 1. Department of Conservation. ISBN 0-478-21863-X.
- Kirk, Thomas (1889). The Forest Flora of New Zealand. Wellington, New Zealand: George Didsbury – via the Internet Archive.
- Laing, R. M. (1906). Plants of New Zealand. Christchurch, New Zealand: Whitcombe and Tombs – via the Internet Archive.
- Little, Elbert; Skolmen, Roger G. (1989). Common forest trees of Hawaii (native and introduced). Vol. 679. Washington D.C., United States: United States Department of Agriculture.
- Metcalf, L. J. (2000). New Zealand Trees and Shrubs: A Comprehensive Guide to Cultivation and Identification. Auckland, New Zealand: Reed Publishing. ISBN 0-7900-0662-6 – via the Internet Archive.
- Metcalf, L. J. (2002). A Photographic Guide to trees of New Zealand. Auckland, New Zealand: New Holland Publishers. ISBN 1-877246-57-3 – via the Internet Archive.
- Mirza, Umair (2005). New Zealand Encyclopedia (6th ed.). New Zealand: David Bateman. ISBN 1-86953-601-0 – via the Internet Archive.
- Poole, A. L.; Adams, Nancy Mary (1963). Trees and Shrubs of New Zealand. Wellington, New Zealand: Government Printing Office – via the Internet Archive.
- Reed, Alexander Wyclif (1963). An Illustrated Encyclopedia of Maori Life. Wellington, New Zealand: A. H. & A. W. Reed – via the Internet Archive.
- Sawyer, John; McFadgen, Bruce; Hughes, Paul (March 2003). Karaka (Corynocarpus laevigatus J.R. et G. Forst.) in Wellington Conservancy (excluding Chatham Islands) (PDF). DOC Science Internal Series. Vol. 101. Department of Conservation. pp. 1–26. ISBN 0-478-22387-0.
- Vennell, Robert (2019). The Meaning of Trees. Auckland, New Zealand: HarperCollins. ISBN 978-1-77554-130-1. LCCN 2019403535.
- Wagner, Warren L.; Herbst, Derral R.; Sohmer, S.H. (1999). Manual of the Flowering Plants of Hawaii. University of Hawaii Press.

Journals

- Atherton, RA; Lockhart, PJ; McLenachan, PA; de Lange, PJ; Wagstaff, SJ; Shepherd, LD (2 October 2015). "A molecular investigation into the origin and relationships of karaka/kōpi (Corynocarpus laevigatus) in New Zealand". Journal of the Royal Society of New Zealand. 45 (4). Informa UK Limited: 212–220. doi:10.1080/03036758.2015.1093006. ISSN 0303-6758.
- Clout, M. N.; Karl, B. J.; Pierce, R. J.; Robertson, H. A. (1995). "Breeding and survival of New Zealand Pigeons Hemiphaga novaeseelandiae". Ibis. 137 (2). Wiley: 264–271. doi:10.1111/j.1474-919x.1995.tb03248.x. ISSN 0019-1019.
- Colenso, William (1880). "On the vegetable food of the ancient New Zealanders before Cook's visit". Transactions and Proceedings of the Royal Society of New Zealand. 13: 3–38 – via Papers Past.
- Costall, J.A.; Carter, R.J.; Shimada, Y.; Anthony, D.; Rapson, G. L. (2006). "The endemic tree Corynocarpus laevigatus (karaka) as a weedy invader in forest remnants of southern North Island, New Zealand". New Zealand Journal of Botany. 44 (1). Informa UK Limited: 5–22. doi:10.1080/0028825x.2006.9513002. ISSN 0028-825X.
- Dawson, Murray I. (1997). "Chromosome numbers in Corynocarpus (Corynocarpaceae)". New Zealand Journal of Botany. 35 (2): 255–258. doi:10.1080/0028825X.1997.10414162. ISSN 0028-825X.
- Degener, Otto; Degener, Isa (1965). "Flora of Hawaii". Kew Bulletin. 19 (2). Springer, Royal Botanic Gardens, Kew: 206. doi:10.2307/4108039. ISSN 0075-5974. JSTOR 4108039.
- Dodgson, Neil; Chen, Yen-Hsin; Zahido, Meimuna (2024). "The colonisation of the colour pink: variation and change in Māori's colour lexicon". Linguistics. doi:10.25455/WGTN.27931935.
- Garnock-Jones, P. J.; Brockie, R. E.; FitzJohn, R. G. (2007). "Gynodioecy, sexual dimorphism and erratic fruiting in Corynocarpus laevigatus (Corynocarpaceae)". Australian Journal of Botany. 55 (8). CSIRO Publishing: 803. doi:10.1071/bt07054. ISSN 0067-1924.
- Hemsley, W. Botting (1903). "On the Genus Corynocarpus, Forst., with Descriptions of two New Species". Annals of Botany. os-17 (4): 743–760. doi:10.1093/oxfordjournals.aob.a088941. ISSN 1095-8290.
- Majak, Walter; Benn, Michael (March 1994). "Additional esters of 3-nitropropanoic acid and glucose from fruit of the New Zealand karaka tree, Corynocarpus laevigatus". Phytochemistry. 35 (4): 901–903. doi:10.1016/S0031-9422(00)90635-6.
- Maxwell, Justin J. (3 July 2017). "Conservation and Restoration of a Cultural Forest Landscape: Protecting the Forests Created by Moriori on Chatham Island". Conservation and Management of Archaeological Sites. 19 (3): 197–209. doi:10.1080/13505033.2017.1342070. ISSN 1350-5033.
- McAlpine, Kate G.; Cory, Sally; Cox, Bart Te Manihera; McLeod (Taranaki Whānui), Terese; Rapson, Gillian; Roskruge (Te Ātiawa, Ngāti Tama), Nick Rahiri; Shepherd, Lara D. (5 September 2024). "Karaka (Corynocarpus laevigatus): native taonga (treasure) or environmental weed?". New Zealand Journal of Botany. 63 (5). Informa UK Limited: 887–912. doi:10.1080/0028825x.2024.2388751. ISSN 0028-825X.
- Maxwell, Justin J.; Tromp, Monica (2016). "Corynocarpus laevigatus: Where art thou? Finding evidence of this elusive tree crop". Review of Palaeobotany and Palynology. 234: 198–210. doi:10.1016/j.revpalbo.2016.09.009.
- Moyer, Barton G.; Pfeffer, Philip E.; Valentine, Kathleen M.; Gustine, David L. (1979). "3-Nitropropanoyl-d-glucopyranoses of Corynocarpus laevigatus". Phytochemistry. 18 (1): 111–113. doi:10.1016/S0031-9422(00)90925-7.
- Obike, Anthony I.; Eze, K.S.; Abdel-Rahman, Ibrahim; Ikeuba, Alexander I.; Nwokolo, Izuchukwu K.; Aghalibe, Christopher (2025). "Evaluation of Corynocarpus laevigatus extract as a green corrosion retardant for mild steel in acidic media: A combined gravimetric, gasometric and electrochemical methods". Current Research in Green and Sustainable Chemistry. 10 100447. doi:10.1016/j.crgsc.2025.100447.
- Skey, W. (1871). "Preliminary Notes on the Isolation of the Bitter Substance of the Nut of the Karaka Tree (Corynocarpus lævigata)". Transactions and Proceedings of the New Zealand Institute. 4: 316–321 – via Papers Past.
- Sopow, Stephanie L.; Bain, John (2017). "A checklist of New Zealand Cerambycidae (Insecta: Coleoptera), excluding Lamiinae". New Zealand Entomologist. 40 (2): 55–71. doi:10.1080/00779962.2017.1357423. ISSN 0077-9962.
- Wagstaff, Steven J.; Dawson, Murray I. (2000). "Classification, Origin, and Patterns of Diversification of Corynocarpus (Corynocarpaceae) Inferred from DNA Sequences". Systematic Botany. 25 (1). American Society of Plant Taxonomists: 134–149. doi:10.2307/2666679. ISSN 0363-6445. JSTOR 2666679.
- Whitaker, A. H. (1987). "The roles of lizards in New Zealand plant reproductive strategies". New Zealand Journal of Botany. 25 (2): 315–328. doi:10.1080/0028825X.1987.10410078. ISSN 0028-825X.
- Wyse, Sarah V.; Perry, George L. W.; O'Connell, Dean M.; Holland, Phillip S.; Wright, Monique J.; Hosted, Catherine L.; Whitelock, Samuel L.; Geary, Ian J.; Maurin, Kévin J. L.; Curran, Timothy J. (2016). "A quantitative assessment of shoot flammability for 60 tree and shrub species supports rankings based on expert opinion". International Journal of Wildland Fire. 25 (4): 466. doi:10.1071/WF15047. ISSN 1049-8001.

Websites

- Betson, Anne (18 December 2019). "Distant celestial objects now 'Kererū' and 'Karaka'". University of Auckland. Archived from the original on 1 March 2024.
- De Lange, Peter (15 January 2012). "Corynocarpus laevigatus". New Zealand Plant Conservation Network. Archived from the original on 9 May 2024.
- Gallaher, TJ; Brock, K; Kennedy, BH; Imada, CT; Imada, K; Walvoord, N (2020). "Corynocarpus laevigatus - Plants of Hawaiʻi". Plants of Hawaiʻi. Archived from the original on 18 December 2024.
- Kerridge, Donna (14 February 2018). "How to prepare the delicious – but poisonous – karaka berry". The Spinoff. Archived from the original on 10 May 2024.
- Moorfield, John. "Karaka — Te Aka Māori Dictionary". Te Aka Māori Dictionary. Archived from the original on 3 February 2022.
- Rapson, J. L. (24 November 2012). "Corynocarpus laevigatus (karaka)". CAB International. doi:10.1079/cabicompendium.59069. Archived from the original on 18 December 2024.
- Saggers, Christio (17 March 2017). "Karaka tree a great native, but beware the danger that lurks beneath". The Marlborough Express. Archived from the original on 14 July 2023.
- Tahana, Jamie (19 February 2022). "Pākaraka name returns to Whanganui village". Radio New Zealand. Archived from the original on 19 February 2022.
- Willis, Rosalie (12 February 2020). "Karaka trees fruiting again producing toxic berries". Kapiti News. New Zealand Herald. Archived from the original on 26 November 2020.
- "1960 Pictorials". NZ Post. Archived from the original on 22 January 2025.
