= Sodium chloroacetate =

Names
- Preferred IUPAC name Sodium chloroacetate
- Other names sodium monochloroacetate

Identifiers
CAS Number	3926-62-3
3D model (JSmol)	Interactive image
ChemSpider	56306
ECHA InfoCard	100.021.363
PubChem CID	23665759
UNII	8D9PZU6L69
CompTox Dashboard (EPA)	DTXSID1027550
- InChI: InChI=1S/C2H3ClO2.Na/c3-1-2(4)5;/h1H2,(H,4,5);/q;+1/p-1 Key: FDRCDNZGSXJAFP-UHFFFAOYSA-M; InChI=1/C2H3ClO2.Na/c3-1-2(4)5;/h1H2,(H,4,5);/q;+1/p-1 Key: FDRCDNZGSXJAFP-REWHXWOFAF
- SMILES: C(C(=O)[O-])Cl.[Na+]

Properties
Chemical formula	C_{2}H_{2}ClNaO_{2}
Molar mass	116.48 g·mol^{−1}
Appearance	white solid
Density	1.401 g/cm^{3} (25 °C)
Solubility in water	soluble in water, ethanol, chloroform, ether and benzene

Hazards
- Occupational safety and health (OHS/OSH)
Main hazards	irritant to skin
Autoignition temperature	does not ignite
- Except where otherwise noted, data are given for materials in their standard state (at 25 °C [77 °F], 100 kPa). verify (what is ?) Infobox references

Sodium chloroacetate is the organic compound with the formula CH_{2}ClCO_{2}Na. A white, water-soluble solid, it is the sodium salt of chloroacetic acid. Many of its uses are similar to those of the parent acid. It is prepared by treating chloroacetic acid with sodium carbonate.

== Uses ==
Chloroacetate is a good alkylating agent, serving as a reagent for affixing the -CH_{2}CO_{2}^{−} group to a wide variety of even weak nucleophiles.

In terms of practical, commercial uses, it is used to convert cellulose to carboxymethylcellulose. It is a precursor to many herbicides dimethoate and benazoline (the salt itself is also used as a contact herbicide). It is a precursor to thioglycolic acid by reaction with sodium hydrosulfide. Reaction with cyanide salts gives cyanoacetate NCCH_{2}CO_{2}Na. Cyanoacetate is a precursor to malonic acid.

Sodium chloroacetate is a common laboratory reagent in organic chemistry as illustrated by many entries in the book series Organic Syntheses. With bifunctional nucleophiles, sodium chloroacetate is a precursor to heterocycles.

Reaction with sodium nitrite give nitroacetic acid. With sodium ethoxide it gives ethoxyacetate. With ethyl acetoacetate ethyl acetosuccinate is produced.

Hydrolysis gives glycolic acid.
