= Penicillium hispanicum =

Scientific classification
- Kingdom: Fungi
- Division: Ascomycota
- Class: Eurotiomycetes
- Order: Eurotiales
- Family: Aspergillaceae
- Genus: Penicillium
- Species: P. hispanicum

Binomial name
- Penicillium hispanicum Ramírez, C.; Martínez, A.T.; Ferrer, S. 1978

Type strain
- ATCC 38667, CBS 691.77, DSM 2416, FRR 2280, IFO 31876, IJFM 322, IJFM 3223, IMI 253785, KCTC 6394, NBRC 31876, VKM F-2179

Species of fungus

Penicillium hispanicum is an anamorph species of the genus of Penicillium which was isolated from Citrus limonum in Spain. Penicillium hispanicum produces hadacidin
