= Karakin =

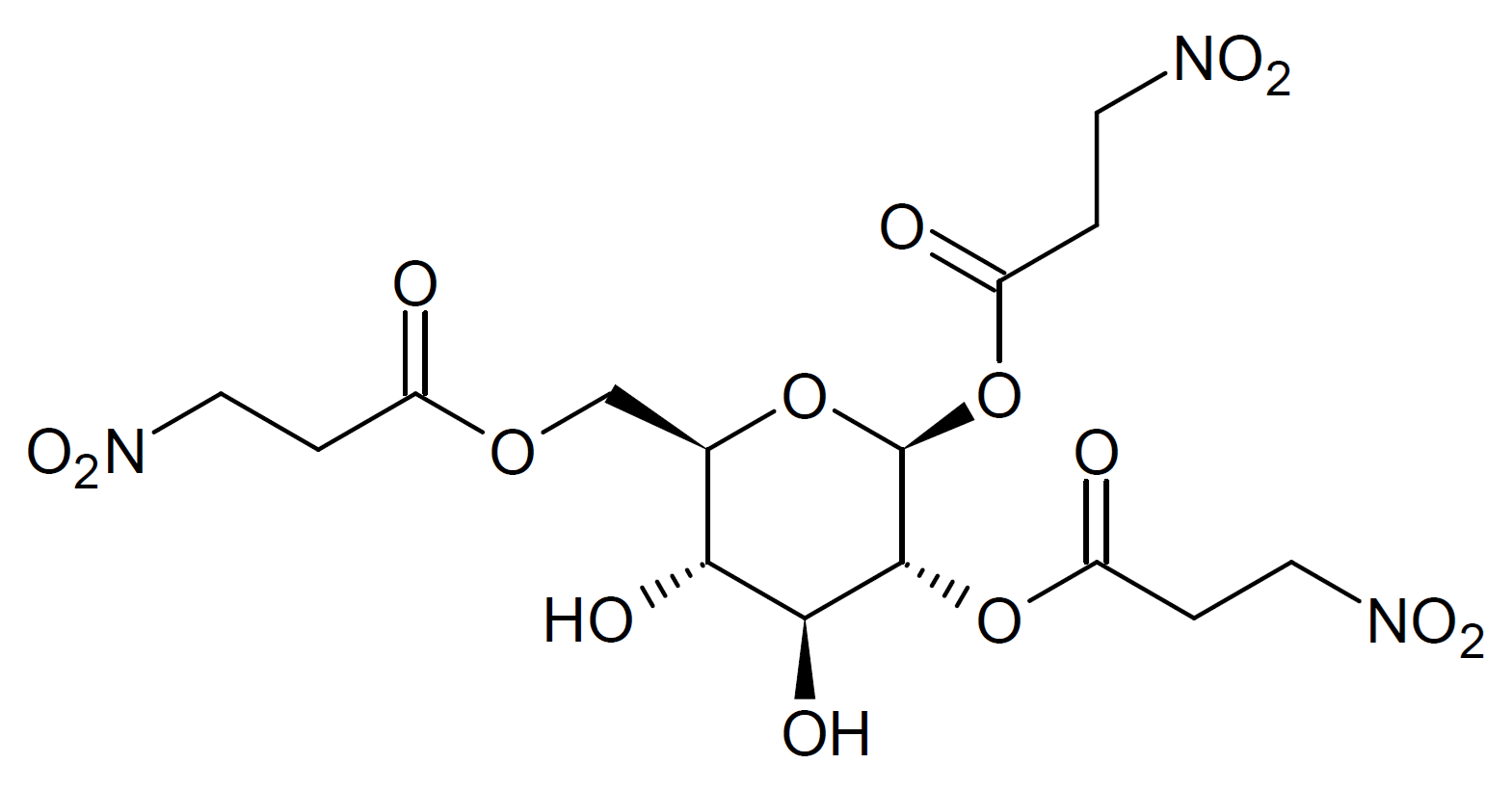

Names
- IUPAC name [(2R,3S,4S,5R,6S)-3,4-dihydroxy-5,6-bis(3-nitropropanoyloxy)oxan-2-yl]methyl 3-nitropropanoate
- Other names 1,2,6-tri-(3-nitropropanoyl)-β-D-glucopyranose

Identifiers
CAS Number	1400-11-9
3D model (JSmol)	Interactive image
ChEBI	CHEBI:6112
ChEMBL	ChEMBL5277815
ChemSpider	90622
KEGG	C08495
PubChem CID	100274
UNII	I84581BGZY
CompTox Dashboard (EPA)	DTXSID40930690
- InChI: InChI=1S/C15H21N3O15/c19-9(1-4-16(24)25)30-7-8-12(22)13(23)14(32-10(20)2-5-17(26)27)15(31-8)33-11(21)3-6-18(28)29/h8,12-15,22-23H,1-7H2/t8-,12-,13+,14-,15+/m1/s1 Key: CNURKUNYCXCBEK-WMNSZERYSA-N
- SMILES: C(C[N+](=O)[O-])C(=O)OC[C@@H]1[C@H]([C@@H]([C@H]([C@@H](O1)OC(=O)CC[N+](=O)[O-])OC(=O)CC[N+](=O)[O-])O)O

Properties
Chemical formula	C_{15}H_{21}N_{3}O_{15}
Molar mass	483.34 g/mol
- Except where otherwise noted, data are given for materials in their standard state (at 25 °C [77 °F], 100 kPa). Infobox references

Karakin is a toxic glucoside found in several plants, principally in the berries of the New Zealand native tree Karaka (Corynocarpus laevigatus), though it has also been identified in other plants such as Corynocarpus similis, Coronilla varia, Lotus pedunculatus, and Heteropterys umbellata. Karakin is the glucoside of 3-nitropropionic acid and can produce severe toxicity when consumed by humans, with symptoms including vomiting, diarrhea, muscle weakness, paralysis, confusion and convulsions. Karaka berries can however be consumed safely by some native New Zealand birds such as Kereru, and were traditionally eaten by Māori after an extensive preparation process to remove the toxin.
