= Penicillium melinii =

Scientific classification
- Domain: Eukaryota
- Kingdom: Fungi
- Division: Ascomycota
- Class: Eurotiomycetes
- Order: Eurotiales
- Family: Aspergillaceae
- Genus: Penicillium
- Species: P. melinii

Binomial name
- Penicillium melinii Thom, C. 1930

Type strain
- CBS 218.30, FRR 2041

Synonyms
- Penicillium radulatum

Species of fungus

Penicillium melinii is an anamorph species of the genus Penicillium which produces griseofulvin and beta-Nitropropionic acid.
