= C2H3NO4 =

The molecular formula C_{2}H_{3}NO_{4} (molar mass: 105.05 g/mol, exact mass: 105.0062 u) may refer to:

- Acetyl nitrate
- Nitroacetic acid
