= Penicillium purpurescens =

Scientific classification
- Domain: Eukaryota
- Kingdom: Fungi
- Division: Ascomycota
- Class: Eurotiomycetes
- Order: Eurotiales
- Family: Aspergillaceae
- Genus: Penicillium
- Species: P. purpurescens

Binomial name
- Penicillium purpurescens Biourge, P. 1923

Synonyms
- Citromyces purpurascens, Penicillium purpurrescens, Penicillium viridialbo, Penicillium viride-albo, Citromyces virido-albus

Species of fungus

Penicillium purpurescens is a species of fungus in the genus Penicillium which was isolated from soil in Canada. This species is similar to Penicillium glabrum. Penicillium purpurescens produces hadacidin.
