= Beta-nitroacrylate reductase =

Class of enzymes

beta-nitroacrylate reductase

Identifiers
- EC no.: 1.3.1.16
- CAS no.: 37255-28-0

Databases
- IntEnz: IntEnz view
- BRENDA: BRENDA entry
- ExPASy: NiceZyme view
- KEGG: KEGG entry
- MetaCyc: metabolic pathway
- PRIAM: profile
- PDB structures: RCSB PDB PDBe PDBsum
- Gene Ontology: AmiGO / QuickGO
Search
- PMC: articles
- PubMed: articles
- NCBI: proteins

In enzymology, beta-nitroacrylate reductase (EC 1.3.1.16) is an enzyme that catalyzes the chemical reaction

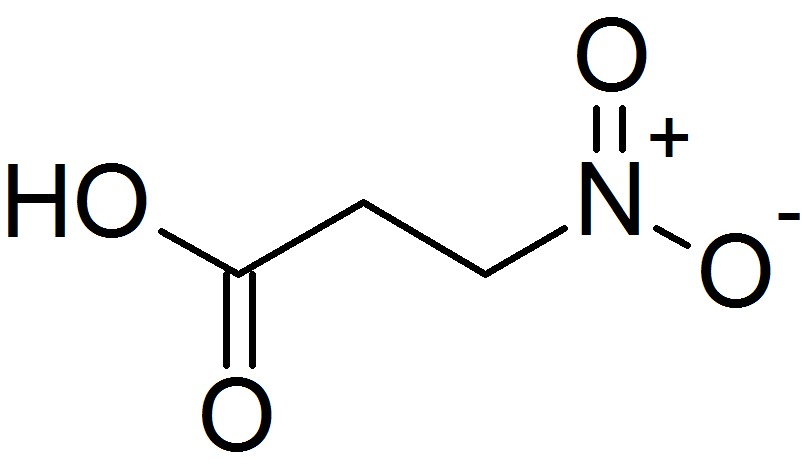
3-Nitropropionic acid
+ NADP^{+}
H^{+}
H^{+}
3-Nitroacrylic acid
+ NADPH

The two substrates of this enzyme are 3-nitropropionic acid and oxidised nicotinamide adenine dinucleotide phosphate (NADP^{+}). Its products are 3-nitroacrylic acid, reduced NADPH, and a proton.

This enzyme belongs to the family of oxidoreductases, specifically those acting on the CH-CH group of donor with NAD+ or NADP+ as acceptor. The systematic name of this enzyme class is 3-nitropropanoate:NADP+ oxidoreductase.
