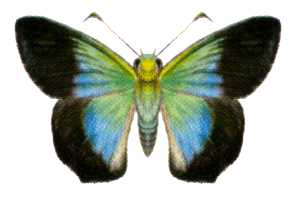
- Allora doleschallii

Scientific classification
- Kingdom: Animalia
- Phylum: Arthropoda
- Clade: Pancrustacea
- Class: Insecta
- Order: Lepidoptera
- Family: Hesperiidae
- Subfamily: Coeliadinae
- Genus: Allora; Waterhouse & Lyell, 1914

Species
- Several, see text

= Allora (butterfly) =

Genus of butterflies

Allora is a genus of skipper butterflies (family Hesperiidae).

== Species ==
- Allora doleschallii Felder, 1860
- Allora major (Rothschild, 1915)
