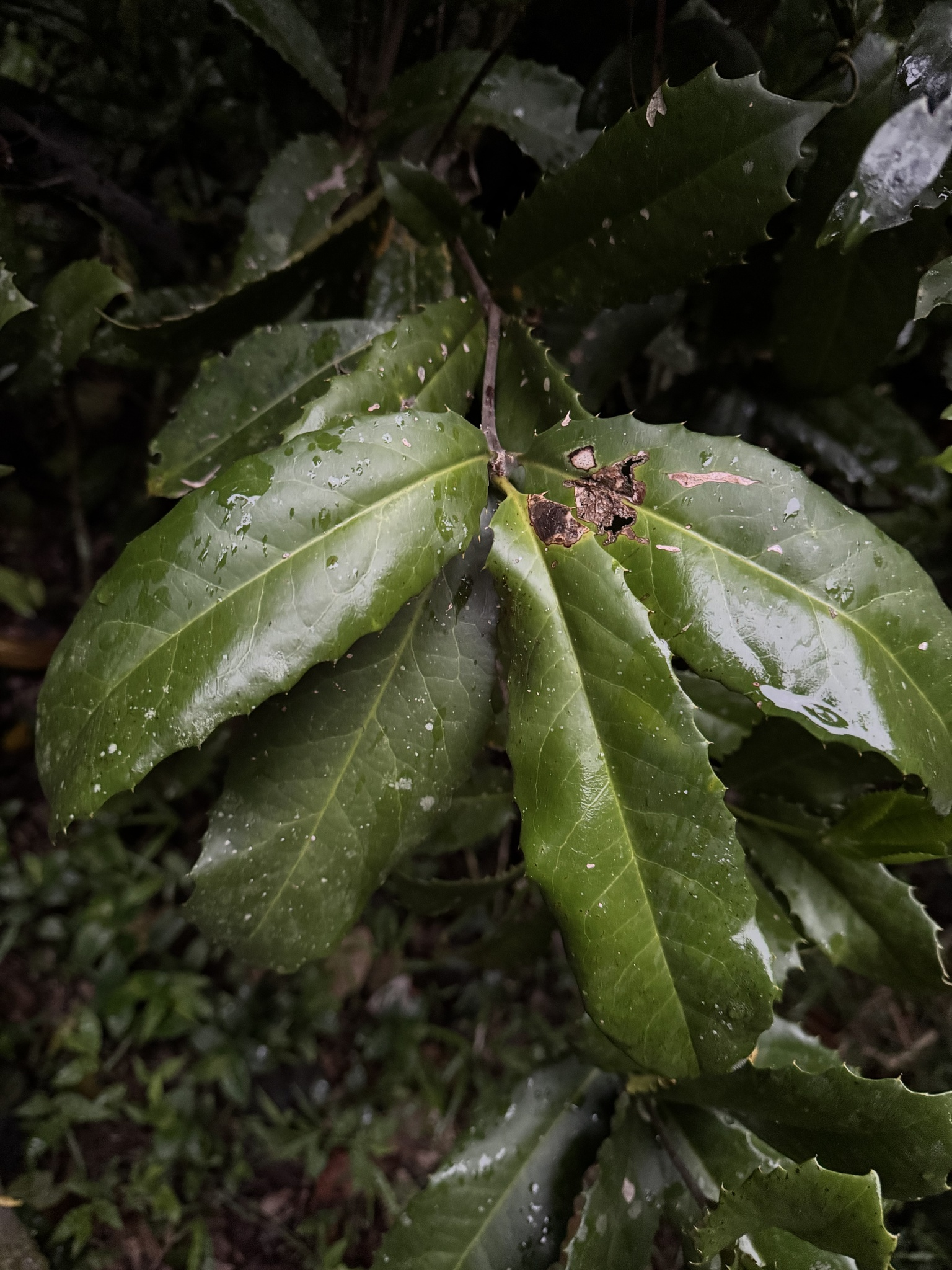
- Corynocarpus rupestris subsp. rupestris

Conservation status
- Vulnerable (EPBC Act)

Scientific classification
- Kingdom: Plantae
- Clade: Tracheophytes
- Clade: Angiosperms
- Clade: Eudicots
- Clade: Rosids
- Order: Cucurbitales
- Family: Corynocarpaceae
- Genus: Corynocarpus
- Species: C. rupestris

Binomial name
- Corynocarpus rupestris Guymer

= Corynocarpus rupestris =

Species of flowering plant

Corynocarpus rupestris, commonly known as the Glenugie karaka, is a species of tree in the family Corynocarpaceae. It is endemic to the eastern coast of Australia, in the states of New South Wales and Queensland. It reaches 12 metres (40 feet) in height. C. rupestris was first described the Australian botanist Gordon P. Guymer in 1984 in the Flora of Australia. He designated two subspecies, subsp. rupestris and subsp. arborescens. It gets its specific epithet, rupestris, from Latin translating to 'rock-dwelling', which is in reference to its habitat.

== Description ==
Corynocarpus rupestris is a species of shrub or tree in the family Corynocarpaceae. It reaches 12 metres (40 feet) in height. It leaves are elliptic to ovate in character, spiny, and slightly curved. Its laminae (leaf blades) are usually 9–14 cm (3.5–5.5 in) long and 4–6 cm (1.6–2.4 in) wide. Its cataphylls are semicircular to ovate in character, and 2–3 mm long. Its inflorescences (flower clusters) are 4–21 cm (1.6–8.3 in) long, its pedicels are 3–5 mm long. Its sepals are 2–4 mm long and 1.3–2 mm wide. Its petals are 2.4–3.5 mm long and 1–1.5 mm wide. Its staminodes are 2–2.5 mm long and approximately 1 mm wide.

== Taxonomy ==
- Corynocarpaceae
  - - - C. rupestris
      - C. cribbianus
  - - C. laevigatus
    - C. similis
    - C. dissimilis

Cladogram showing the relationship of the species within the sole genus in the family Corynocarpaceae.

Corynocarpus rupestris was first described by the Australian botanist Gordon P. Guymer in 1984 in the Flora of Australia. It differs from other Corynocarpus species because of its spiny leaves and spoon-shaped petals. Guymer designated two subspecies, subsp. rupestris and subsp. arborescens. C. rupestris is most closely related to C. cribbianus.

Corynocarpus species are found across the Pacific Islands and Australia, including: C. dissilmilis in New Caledonia, C. cribbianus in North Queensland and New Guinea, C. laevigatus in New Zealand, and C. similis in the Solomon Islands and Vanuatu.

=== Etymology ===
The etymology (word origin) of the genus name Corynocarpus derives from the Greek koryne, meaning 'club', and carpus, meaning 'fruit', translating to English as 'club fruit'. The specific epithet (second part of the scientific name), rupestris, is Latin for 'rock-dwelling', and is in reference to the species' habitat. It is commonly known as the Glenugie karaka.

== Distribution ==
Corynocarpus rupestris is endemic to the Australian states of New South Wales and Queensland. It is typically found on basaltic slopes. Its conservation status was assessed as "Vulnerable".

== Works cited ==
Books

- Guymer, G. P. (1984). Flora of Australia: Rhizophorales to Celastrales. Vol. 22. Canberra, Australia: Australian Government Publ. Service. ISBN 978-0-644-02863-9.
- Greer, Germaine (2014). White Beech: The Rainforest Years. London, United Kingdom: Bloomsbury Paperbacks. ISBN 9781408846711.

Journals

- Atherton, Ra; Lockhart, Pj; McLenachan, Pa; de Lange, Pj; Wagstaff, Sj; Shepherd, Ld (2015). "A molecular investigation into the origin and relationships of karaka/kōpi (Corynocarpus laevigatus) in New Zealand". Journal of the Royal Society of New Zealand. 45 (4): 212–220. doi:10.1080/03036758.2015.1093006. ISSN 0303-6758.
- Wagstaff, Steven J.; Dawson, Murray I. (2000). "Classification, Origin, and Patterns of Diversification of Corynocarpus (Corynocarpaceae) Inferred from DNA Sequences". Systematic Botany. 25 (1). American Society of Plant Taxonomists: 134–149. doi:10.2307/2666679. ISSN 0363-6445. JSTOR 2666679.

Websites

- De Lange, Peter (15 January 2012). "Corynocarpus laevigatus". New Zealand Plant Conservation Network. Archived from the original on 9 May 2024.
- "Taxon – Corynocarpus rupestris subsp. arborescens (Southern Corynocarpus)". Queensland Government. 2025. Archived from the original on 16 June 2025.
