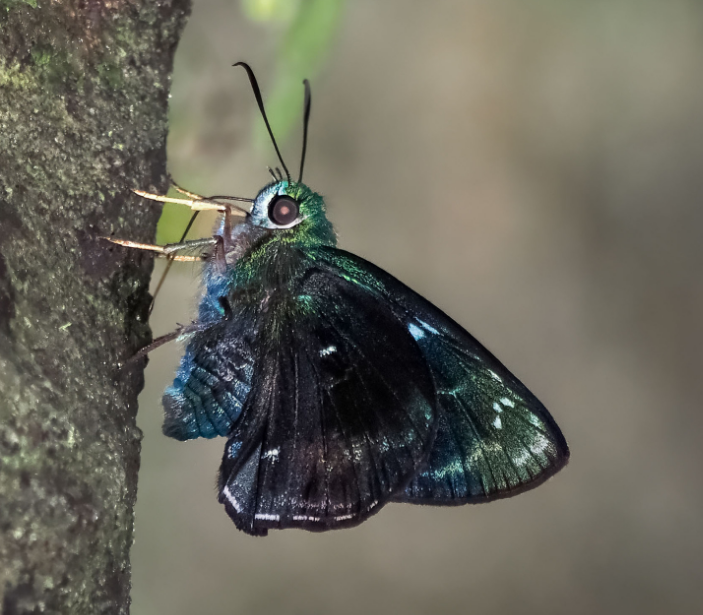

Scientific classification
- Domain: Eukaryota
- Kingdom: Animalia
- Phylum: Arthropoda
- Class: Insecta
- Order: Lepidoptera
- Family: Hesperiidae
- Genus: Allora
- Species: A. major

Binomial name
- Allora major (Rothschild, 1915)

Synonyms
- Hasora major Rothschild, 1915; Hasora doleschallii major Rothschild, 1915

= Allora major =

Greater peacock awl

Species of butterfly

Allora major, the greater peacock awl, is a butterfly of the family Hesperiidae. It is found as several subspecies in New Guinea and adjacent islands, and on Cape York, Australia.

The wingspan is about 40 mm for males and 50 mm for females.

The larvae probably feed on Corynocarpus cribbianus.

== Subspecies ==
- Allora major major
- Allora major lectra Evans, 1949 (Schouten Island)
- Allora major talesia Evans, 1949 (New Britain)
