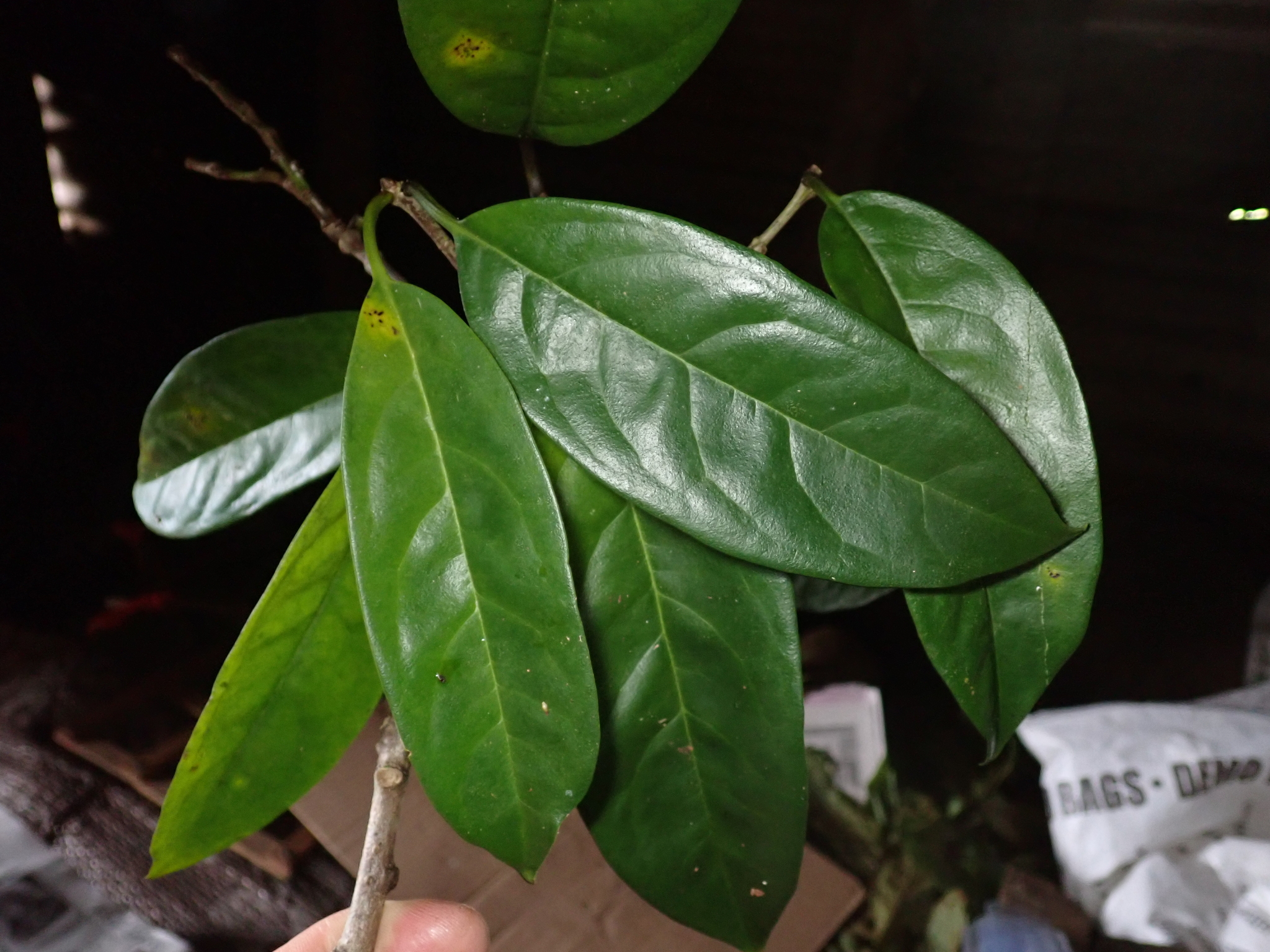

Scientific classification
- Kingdom: Plantae
- Clade: Embryophytes
- Clade: Tracheophytes
- Clade: Spermatophytes
- Clade: Angiosperms
- Clade: Eudicots
- Clade: Rosids
- Order: Cucurbitales
- Family: Corynocarpaceae
- Genus: Corynocarpus
- Species: C. similis

Binomial name
- Corynocarpus similis Hemsley

= Corynocarpus similis =

Species of flowering plant

Corynocarpus similis is a species of tree in the family Corynocarpaceae, reaching 13 metres (40 feet) in height. It is endemic to Vanuatu. It was first described by the British botanist William Hemsley in 1904 in his revision of the Corynocarpus genus. It is most closely related to C. laevigatus and C. disimilis, but differs due to its wider leaves and their shape. C. similis's seeds contain poisonous glucosides compounds of 3-nitropropionic acid, which are similar to those found in C. laevigatus.

== Description ==
Corynocarpus similis is a species of tree in the family Corynocarpaceae, growing to a height of up to 13 metres (40 feet). Its leaves have an almost leathery texture and are 15–20 cm (5.9–7.9 in) long and 4–8 cm (1.6–3.1 in) wide. Its flowers are 10 mm in diameter. Its sepals are spherical or rounded in character. Its fruits are edible.

=== Phytochemistry ===
Corynocarpus similis's seeds contain poisonous glucosides compounds of 3-nitropropionic acid, which are similar to those found in C. laevigatus.

== Taxonomy ==
- Corynocarpaceae
  - - - C. rupestris
      - C. cribbianus
  - - C. laevigatus
    - C. similis
    - C. dissimilis

Cladogram showing the relationship of the species within the sole genus in the family Corynocarpaceae.

Corynocarpus similis was first described by British botanist William Hemsley in 1904 in his revision of the Corynocarpus genus. C. similis is similar to C. laevigatus but differs due to their wider leaves and their shape.

Corynocarpus species are found across the Pacific Islands and Australia, including: C. dissilmilis in New Caledonia, C. cribbianus in North Queensland and New Guinea, C. laevigatus in New Zealand, and C. rupestris in the Australian states of New South Wales and Queensland. In a 2000 study, rbcL sequencing reaveled that the species is most closely related to C. laevigatus and C. disimilis.

=== Etymology ===
The etymology (word origin) of the genus name Corynocarpus derives from the Greek koryne, meaning 'club', and carpus, meaning 'fruit', translating in English to 'club fruit'. The specific epithet (second part of the scientific name), similis, is a Latin word meaning 'similar' or 'like'. It is unclear why Hemsley chose this as the specific epithet since he does not provide an explanation. It has been hypothesised that it denotes a similarity between it and C. laevigatus.

== Distribution ==
Corynocarpus dissimilis is endemic to the Bismarck Archipelago, Solomon Islands, New Britain, New Ireland, and Vanuatu.

== Works cited ==
Books

- Gledhill, David (2008). The Names of Plants. Cambridge, United Kingdom: Cambridge University Press. ISBN 978-0-521-68553-5.
- Harris, Warwick; Kapoor, Promila (1990). Nga Mahi Maori O Te Wao Nui a Tane. Christchurch, New Zealand: Botany Division. ISBN 0-477-02579-X.

Journals

- Atherton, Ra; Lockhart, Pj; McLenachan, Pa; de Lange, Pj; Wagstaff, Sj; Shepherd, Ld (2015). "A molecular investigation into the origin and relationships of karaka/kōpi (Corynocarpus laevigatus) in New Zealand". Journal of the Royal Society of New Zealand. 45 (4): 212–220. doi:10.1080/03036758.2015.1093006. ISSN 0303-6758.
- Cabalion, P.; Poisson, J. (1987). "Corynocarpus simili Hemsley, Plante Alimentaire et Toxique de Vanuatu (ex-nouvelles-hebrides)". Journal of Ethnopharmacology. 21 (2). Elsevier BV: 189–191. doi:10.1016/0378-8741(87)90130-9. ISSN 0378-8741.
- Hemsley, W. Botting (1903). "On the Genus Corynocarpus, Forst., with Descriptions of two New Species". Annals of Botany. os-17 (4): 743–760. doi:10.1093/oxfordjournals.aob.a088941. ISSN 1095-8290.
- Wagstaff, Steven J.; Dawson, Murray I. (2000). "Classification, Origin, and Patterns of Diversification of Corynocarpus (Corynocarpaceae) Inferred from DNA Sequences". Systematic Botany. 25 (1). American Society of Plant Taxonomists: 134–149. doi:10.2307/2666679. ISSN 0363-6445. JSTOR 2666679.

Websites

- De Lange, Peter (15 January 2012). "Corynocarpus laevigatus". New Zealand Plant Conservation Network. Archived from the original on 9 May 2024.
- International Plant Names Index (IPNI) (2025). "Corynocarpus similis Hemsl". International Plant Names Index. The Royal Botanic Gardens, Kew; Harvard University Herbaria & Libraries; and, Australian National Botanic Gardens.
