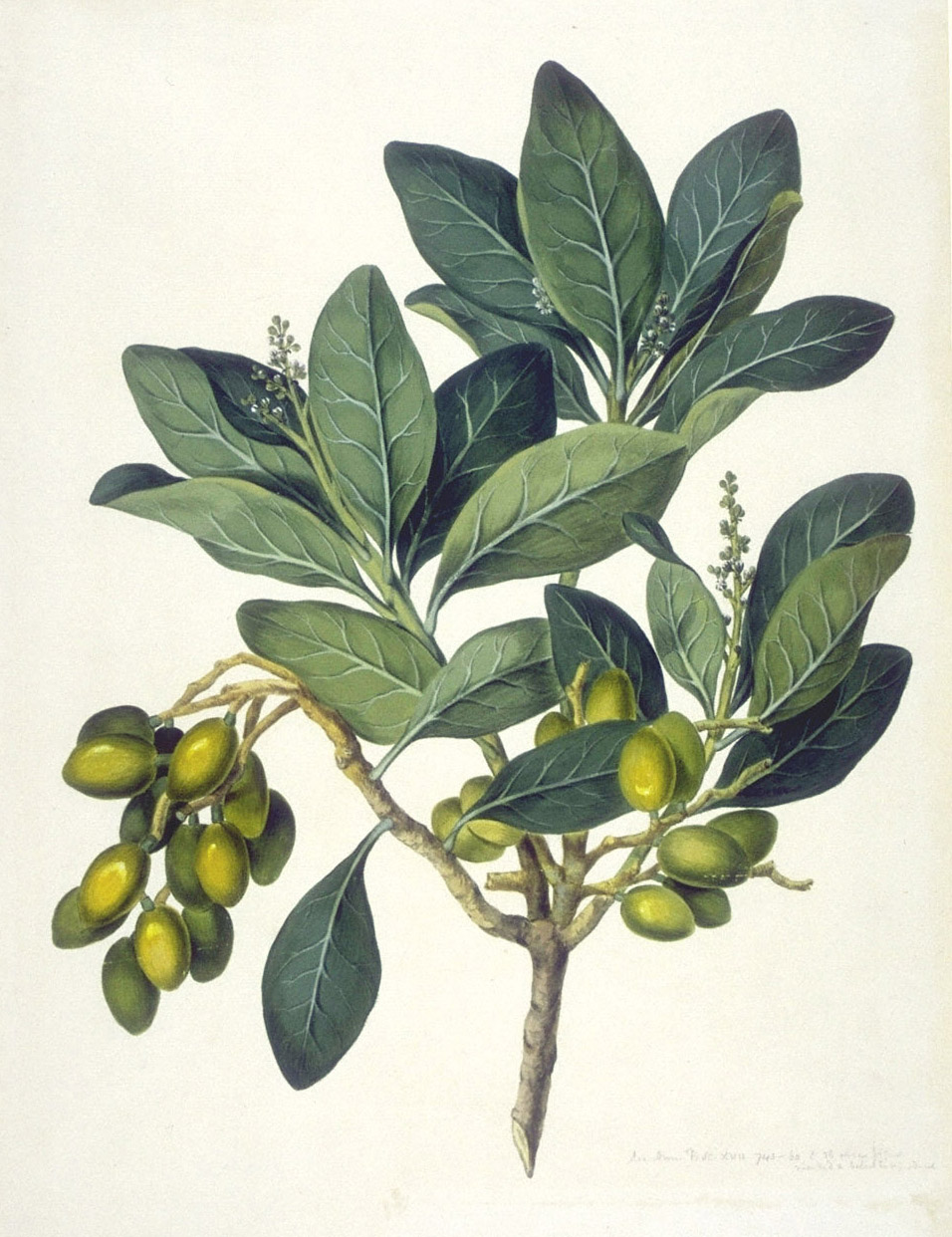
- An early illustration of Corynocarpus laevigatus by John Frederick Miller

Scientific classification
- Kingdom: Plantae
- Clade: Tracheophytes
- Clade: Angiosperms
- Clade: Eudicots
- Clade: Rosids
- Order: Cucurbitales
- Family: Corynocarpaceae; Engl.
- Genus: Corynocarpus; J.R.Forst. & G.Forst.

= Corynocarpus =

Genus of flowering plants

Corynocarpus is the only genus of plants in the family Corynocarpaceae and includes five species. It is native to New Guinea, Australia, New Zealand, New Caledonia, and Vanuatu.

== Species ==
- Corynocarpus cribbianus (F. M. Bailey) L. S. Sm. (syn C. australasicus) - New Guinea, Aru Islands, Queensland
- Corynocarpus dissimilis Hemsl. - New Caledonia
- Corynocarpus laevigatus J. R. Forst. & G. Forst. - New Zealand
- Corynocarpus rupestris Guymer - Queensland, New South Wales
- Corynocarpus similis Hemsl. - Vanuatu
