= Karaka Bay (Auckland) =

Bay in Glendowie, Auckland, New Zealand

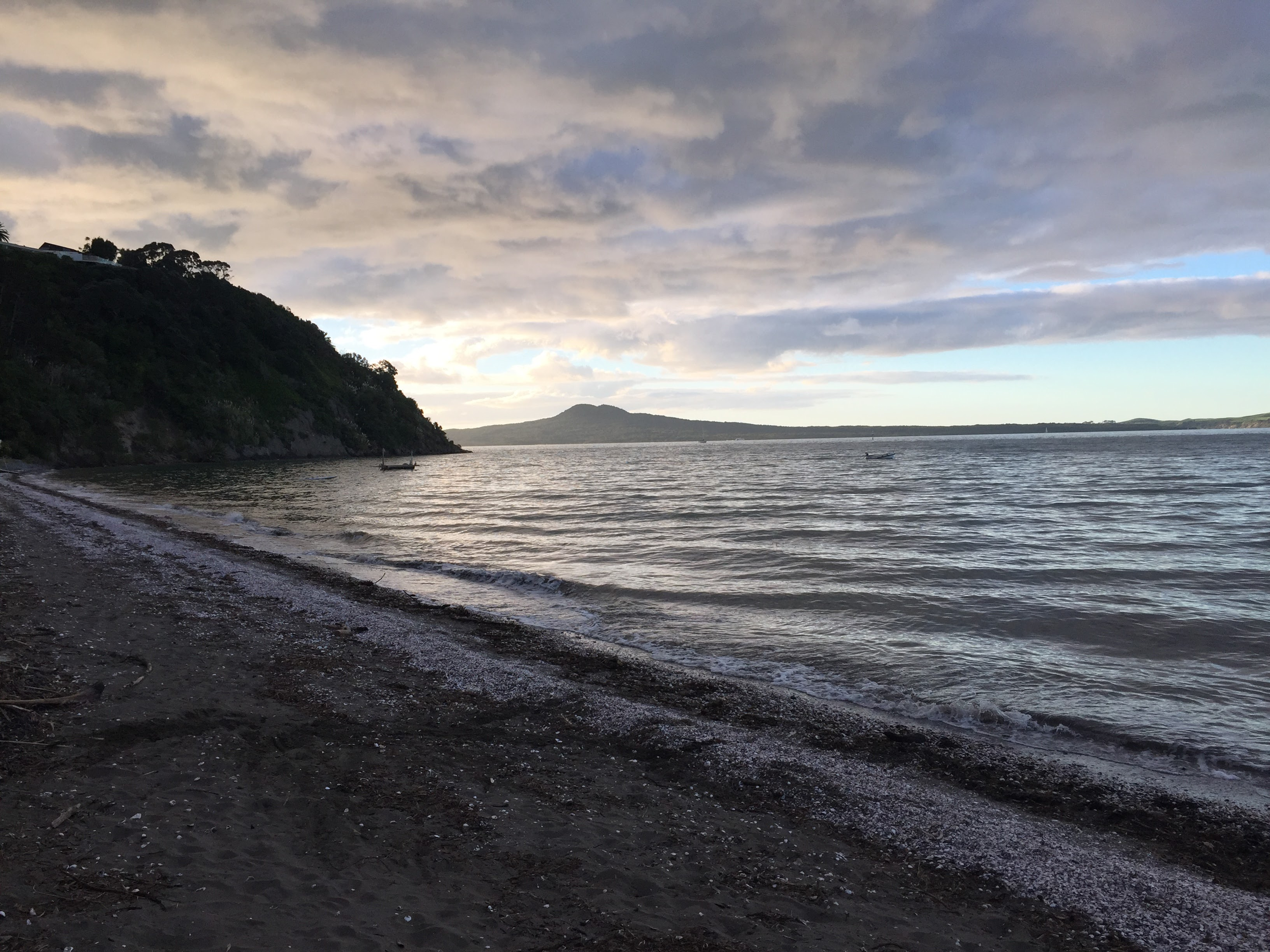
- View from the south end of the bay towards Rangitoto Island

- Location within the Auckland Region
- Location: Auckland Region, New Zealand
- Coordinates: 36.8493°S 174.878°E
- Ocean/sea sources: Tāmaki River, Hauraki Gulf, Pacific Ocean
- Settlements: Glendowie

Karaka Bay or Waiarohe ('the bay of shimmering waters') is on the western shore of the Tāmaki River mouth in the suburb of Glendowie, Auckland. The bay is bordered to the north by Te Papa a Tamatera (West Tamaki Head) and looks out to the islands of the eastern Waitematā Harbour: Rangitoto, Motutapu, Motukorea (Browns Island), Motuihe and Waiheke as well as to Musick Point (East Tamaki Head) across the estuary. It is accessed by boat or by a steep path that winds down the hill from the end of Peacock Street; there is no road access to the bay itself. This lack of road access has given Karaka Bay a unique sense of identity; it is unlike anywhere else in Auckland.

== History ==
In pre-European times, according to an account given by Māori chief Maihi Te Kampu Te Hinaki to George Graham, the Tainui canoe moored at Karaka Bay and some crew members settled in the area. There was once a Māori pā (fortified site) possibly known as Taurere (also the name of nearby Taylors Hill) but also referred to as Ohuirangi at the top of the bay, towards its south end, approximately at 9 Peacock Street, and many historical artefacts such as adzes and evidence of early habitation such as middens have been discovered. The bay is named after the karaka trees which were planted as a food source for the pā.

In February 1827 French navigator Dumont d’Urville visited the area in the ship Astrolabe. Later that year the bay was thought to be the site of the last battle fought in Auckland when the Ngapuhi tribe was defeated by Ngati Tipa of Waikato with help from Ngāti Pāoa and Ngāti Maru refugees using the manu-kawhaki ambuscade.

On 4 March 1840 The Treaty of Waitangi was signed, most likely at Karaka Bay, by 17 chiefs mostly from Ngāti Pāoa, Ngāti Maru and Ngāi Tai. William Hobson was not actually present for this signing as he was on board the Herald at anchor, having suffered a stroke 3 days previously. Instead, Captain Nias acted as head of the official party. Four months later, on 9 July 1840, another six chiefs signed the treaty, most likely at Karaka Bay, this time with Hobson present. Captain David Rough, Auckland's first harbour master, described the event: "The Union Jack was hoisted and the Treaty of Waitangi spread out for signature on a table at which stood His Excellency, and behind him mounted police in their showy uniform. The sun shone brightly, and the gathering of natives (Māori) clad in their mats, the canoes drawn up on the white sandy beach, the cutter at anchor, and the small group of Europeans beside the flag in front of the fine trees on the slope of the hills behind, formed a very picturesque and striking scene".

On 28 May 1841, 24 Ngāti Pāoa chiefs sold the land block, then known as Kohimarama, which included Karaka Bay, to the Crown. The bay formed part of the Glendowie allotment which was created in 1842.

On 8 February 1845 John Commons and William McKenzie bought the block that included Karaka Bay from the Crown.

In 1912 the Glendowie Estate was sold to grazier George Riddell after whom Riddell Rd at the top of the bay is named.

In 1921 the area was subdivided into sections to be auctioned. At that time, what is now Peacock St was known as Pah Road.

In 1923 the first permanent building, a boat shed, was erected. Later holiday baches were added in the 1920s. These were gradually replaced by more permanent residences.

In 1925 a 1.9-metre (6 ft 2 in) leopard that had escaped from the Auckland Zoo three weeks earlier was found dead in the Tamaki river by a fishing party in Karaka Bay.

In 1931 it was proposed that the outfall for the discharge of Auckland’s raw sewage into the Waitematā, which was then at Orakei, should be relocated to Motukorea (Browns Island). The pipeline was completed to the northern end of Karaka Bay, but the idea was squashed in 1953 before the underwater pipeline to Motukorea (Browns Island) was completed following many years of strong opposition.

In 1953 a drinking fountain, designed by Tibor Donner, and seat was erected by the City Council just off the path to commemorate the Treaty signing. The commemorative plaque was stolen from the memorial in 2010 but a replacement was installed shortly afterwards.

In July 1953, heavy rain led to a major slip which brought down a newly built house in Peacock St.

In 1997 the bay gained local and international notoriety as the home of a large white pig, named Piglet. Piglet was born in the Hokianga, and came to Karaka Bay with a mini-bus of Vernacular Architecture students, having been won in a "basket auction" fundraiser for a Northland marae. She was popular with many people, charmed the local children, and attracted media attention all around the world. The BBC sent a crew from London to film her, and a Reuters feature led to articles in Asia and Europe. For many people she became synonymous with Karaka Bay, with both international and local visitors coming to the Bay just to see Piglet, or to go for a swim with her. Piglet eventually returned to the Hokianga and is buried at Te Ohu. Her owner, Tony Watkins, later wrote a children's book Piglet the Great of Karaka Bay based on the story.

On 1 December 2012 representatives from Ngāti Pāoa signed the Tāmaki Makaurau Collective Redress Deed at Karaka Bay.

On 4 March 2015 Ngāti Pāoa Iwi Trust organised an event to commemorate 175 years since the signing of the Treaty of Waitangi.

In 2018 a group of children found some remains of a wrecked boat that a family used to sleep in around 1925.
