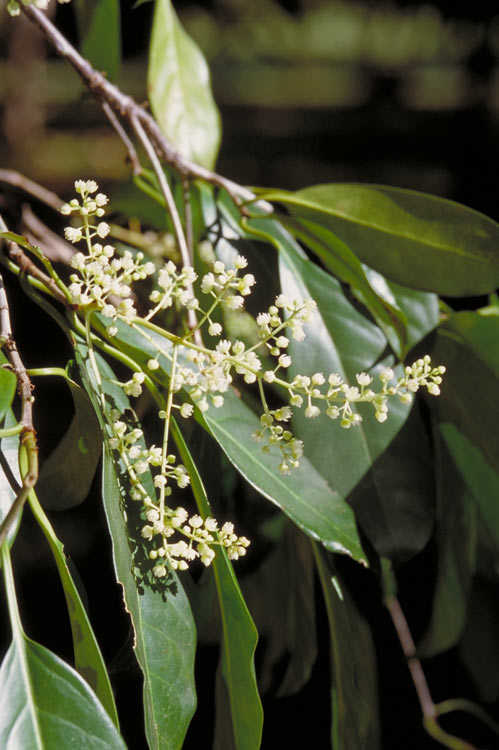
- C. cribbianus's inflorescence (flower cluster)

Conservation status
- Least Concern (IUCN 3.1)

Scientific classification
- Kingdom: Plantae
- Clade: Tracheophytes
- Clade: Angiosperms
- Clade: Eudicots
- Clade: Rosids
- Order: Cucurbitales
- Family: Corynocarpaceae
- Genus: Corynocarpus
- Species: C. cribbianus

Binomial name
- Corynocarpus cribbianus F.M.Bailey

= Corynocarpus cribbianus =

Species of flowering plant

Corynocarpus cribbianus, commonly known as cribwood, is a species of tree in the family Corynocarpaceae. It is endemic to New Guinea and north-eastern Queensland in Australia. It reaches a height of up to 25 metres (80 feet). Its flowers are whitish in colour, the tips of the petals are slightly rose in colour; after flowering, the flowers turn into a distinct rose colour. Its panicles (branched flower clusters) are somewhat pyramidal in character. It occurs from near sea level to 1,800 m (6,000 ft) above sea level at maximum elevation. It is found in various rainforest types, including lowland and montane forests. The specific epithet, cribbianus, is named in honour of J. G. Cribb, an Australian pomologist.

Corynocarpus cribbianus was first described by the Australian botanist Frederick Manson Bailey in 1897 and placed by him in the Cyanocarpus genus. In 1933, the species was placed in the Corynocarpus genus. C. cribbianus is most closely related to C. rupestris. Several animals and various bird species have been reported to consume the fruits of C. cribbianus. The larvae of Allora major are known to feed on the tree, and the females lay eggs on it.

== Description ==
Corynocarpus cribbianus is a species of tree in the family Corynocarpaceae. It reaches a height of up to 25 metres (80 feet). Its bark is greyish-brown in colour with prominent lenticels, the inner bark and heartwood are light-brown in colour. Its bracts are thick, triangular in shape and acute in character, are 4 mm–6 mm × 3 mm–4 mm (0.16 in–0.24 in × 0.12 in–0.16 in), the inner bracts are narrower. Its leaves are elliptic to oblong in character, distinctly acute, tapering to a tip, with its base which is wedge-shaped narrowed into the petioles, which are 1–2 cm (0.39–0.79 in), 9 cm–22 cm × 3 cm–9 cm (3.5 in–8.7 in × 1.2 in–3.5 in) long. Its inflorescences (flower clusters) are 4–10 cm (1.6–3.9 in) long. Its panicles (branched flower clusters) are somewhat pyramidal in character, 6–16 cm (2.4–6.3 in) long and 5–25 cm (2.0–9.8 in) wide.

Its flowers are whitish in colour and the tips of the petals are slightly rose in colour; after flowering, the flowers turn into a distinctly rose colour. Its sepals are broadly elliptic with a rounded tip, and 1 mm–2 mm × 1 mm–2 mm (0.039 in–0.079 in × 0.039 in–0.079 in) long. Its petals are obovate, oblong, to elliptic in character, and 2 mm–3 mm × 1 mm (0.079 in–0.118 in × 0.039 in) long. Its anthers are brownish to dark-brown in colour, acute to ovate in character, and 2 mm long. Its staminodes are obovate to oblong in character, 2–3 mm long. Its ovaries are green in colour and 1 mm high. Its stigmas are greenish-brown in colour. Its receptacles form a flattened disc located between the ovaries and the points where the sepals attach. Its fruits are edible, elliptic to globe-shaped; the pericarps are hard and 3 cm–5 cm × 3 cm–3 cm (1.2 in–2.0 in × 1.2 in–1.2 in) long, greyish-green to red in colour; the exocarps are 2 mm in diameter, and the endocarps are smooth.

== Taxonomy ==
- Corynocarpaceae
  - - - C. rupestris
      - C. cribbianus
  - - C. laevigatus
    - C. similis
    - C. dissimilis

Cladogram showing the relationship of the species within the sole genus of the family Corynocarpaceae.

Corynocarpus cribbianus was first described by the Australian botanist Frederick Manson Bailey in 1897 in the Queensland Agricultural Journal. It was placed by him in the Cyanocarpus genus, and described as Cyanocarpus cribbiana. Bailey later placed it in the Helicia genus in his comprehensive 1899 revision of Queensland's plant species. In 1933, Australian botanist Cyril Tenison White placed the species in the genus Corynocarpus and described it as Corynocarpus australasicus. In 1957, Australian botanist Lindsay Stuart Smith described it as Corynocarpus cribbianus in the sixty-seventh volume of the Proceedings of the Royal Society of Queensland.

Corynocarpus species are found across the Pacific Islands and Australia, including: C. dissimilis in New Caledonia, C. laevigatus in New Zealand, C. rupestris in the Australian states of New South Wales and Queensland, and C. similis in the Solomon Islands and Vanuatu. In a 2000 study, rbcL sequencing reaveled that the species is most closely related to C. rupestris.

=== Etymology ===
The etymology (word origin) of the genus name Corynocarpus derives from the Greek koryne, meaning 'club', and carpus, meaning 'fruit', translating to English as 'club fruit'. The specific epithet (second part of the scientific name), cribbianus, is named in honour of J. G. Cribb, an Australian pomologist, whom Bailey intended to introduce the fruits of new species to. The specific epiphet is a Latinisation of his surname. The species is commonly known as cribwood. (Note: The double-B spelling 'cribbwood' appears to be also used as a vernacular name.)

== Distribution ==
Corynocarpus cribbianus is endemic to New Guinea and north-eastern Queensland in Australia. In Queensland, its range covers the Atherton Tableland, the Division of Kennedy, and the Shire of Cook. In Queensland, it occurs from Iron Range south to Tully River. The species also occurs in the Aru Islands. It occurs from near sea level to 1,800 m (6,000 ft) above sea level in maximum elevation. It is found in various rainforest types, including lowland and montane forests. C. cribbianus's conservation status was assessed by the IUCN Red List in 2021 as "Least Concern", and its population trend was evaluated as "Stable".

== Ecology ==
The larvae of Allora major feed on the tree and the females lay eggs on it. The southern cassowary (Casuarius casuarius), coppery brushtail possum (Trichosurus johnstonii), fruit bat (Pteropus spp.), and various bird species have been reported to consume the fruits of C. cribbianus.

== Works cited ==
Books

- Bailey, Frederick Mason (1899). The Queensland Flora. Birsbane, Australia: Queensland Government – via the Internet Archive.
- Braby, Michael (2016). The Complete Field Guide to Butterflies of Australia. Clayton, Australia: Csiro Publishing. ISBN 1-4863-0102-9.
- Cooper, Wendy (2013). Australian Rainforest Fruits. Collingwood, Australia: Csiro Publishing. ISBN 978-0-643-10784-7.
- Gledhill, David (2008). The Names of Plants. Cambridge, United Kingdom: Cambridge University Press. ISBN 978-0-521-68553-5.
- Laurance, William F.; Bierregaard, Richard O. (1997). Tropical Forest Remnants. Chicago, United States: University of Chicago Press. ISBN 0-226-46899-2.
- Sukarya, Deniek G. (2013). 3500 Plant Species of the Botanic Gardens of Indonesia. Jakarta, Indonesia: Sukarya & Sukarya Pandeama. ISBN 978-602-18768-2-4.

Journals

- Atherton, Ra; Lockhart, Pj; McLenachan, Pa; de Lange, Pj; Wagstaff, Sj; Shepherd, Ld (2015). "A molecular investigation into the origin and relationships of karaka/kōpi (Corynocarpus laevigatus) in New Zealand". Journal of the Royal Society of New Zealand. 45 (4): 212–220. doi:10.1080/03036758.2015.1093006. ISSN 0303-6758.
- Bailey, Frederick Manson Bailey (1897). "Queensland Agricultural Journal". Queensland Agricultural Journal. 1. Queensland Dept. of Primary Industries.
- Smith, Lindsay Stuart (1957). "The Proceedings of the Royal Society of Queensland". Royal Society of Queensland. ISSN 0080-469X.
- Vanclay, Jerome K. (1991). "Aggregating tree species to develop diameter increment equations for tropical rainforests". Forest Ecology and Management. 42 (3–4): 143–168. doi:10.1016/0378-1127(91)90022-N.
- Van Steenis, Cornelis Gijsbert Gerrit Jan (1 January 1948). "Corynocarpaceae". Flora Malesiana — Series 1, Spermatophyta. 4 (1): 262–264. ISSN 1872-924X.
- Wagstaff, Steven J.; Dawson, Murray I. (2000). "Classification, Origin, and Patterns of Diversification of Corynocarpus (Corynocarpaceae) Inferred from DNA Sequences". Systematic Botany. 25 (1). American Society of Plant Taxonomists: 134–149. doi:10.2307/2666679. ISSN 0363-6445. JSTOR 2666679.
- White, C. T. (1933). "Ligneous plants collected for the Arnold Arboretum in North Queensland by S. F. Kajewski in 1929". The Arnold Arboretum of Harvard University. 4. Jamaica Plain, Mass. doi:10.5962/bhl.title.152889.

Websites

- De Lange, Peter (15 January 2012). "Corynocarpus laevigatus". New Zealand Plant Conservation Network. Archived from the original on 9 May 2024.
- Jimbo, T. (2022). "Corynocarpus cribbianus". IUCN Red List. doi:10.2305/IUCN.UK.2022-1.RLTS.T198441377A202836854.en. Archived from the original on 5 May 2025.
