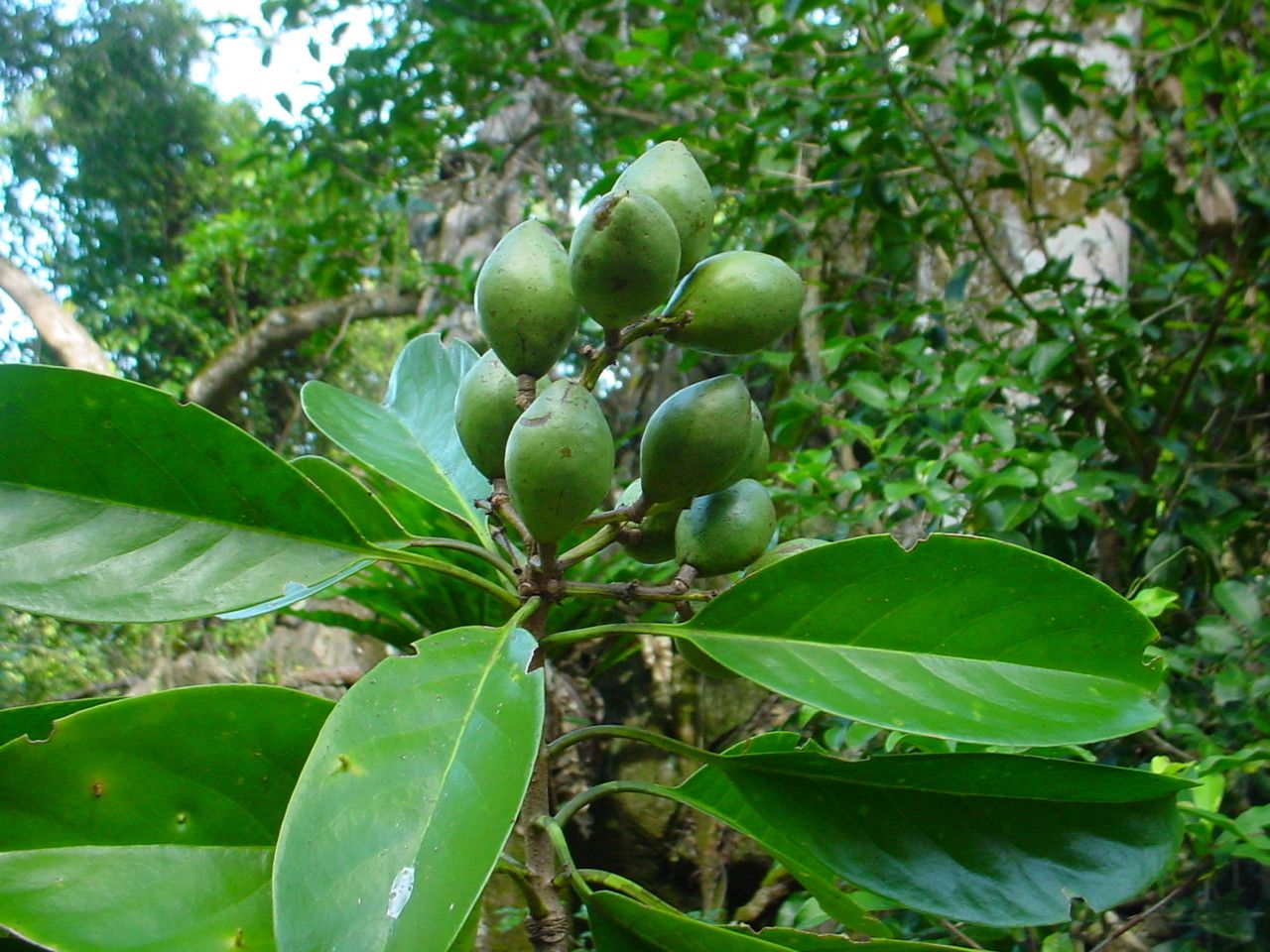

Scientific classification
- Kingdom: Plantae
- Clade: Embryophytes
- Clade: Tracheophytes
- Clade: Spermatophytes
- Clade: Angiosperms
- Clade: Eudicots
- Clade: Rosids
- Order: Cucurbitales
- Family: Corynocarpaceae
- Genus: Corynocarpus
- Species: C. dissimilis

Binomial name
- Corynocarpus dissimilis Hemsley

= Corynocarpus dissimilis =

Species of flowering plant

Corynocarpus dissimilis is a species of tree in the family Corynocarpaceae, reaching 25 metres (80 feet) in height. It is endemic to New Caledonia. It was first described by the British botanist William Hemsley in 1904. C. dissimilis is the only member of the Corynocarpus genus that is endemic to New Caledonia. C. dissimilis is most closely related to C. laevigatus and C. similis, but is distinct due to its much smaller leaves and flowers. It is common in dense forests, reaching 1,200 m (3,900 ft) above sea level at maximum elevation.

== Description ==
Corynonocarpus dissimilis is a species of tree in the family Corynocarpaceae, growing to a height of up to 25 metres (80 feet). Its leaves have an almost leathery texture. Its petioles 6–12 cm (2.4–4.7 in) long and 5–6 cm (2.0–2.4 in) wide. Its flowers are 4–5 mm in diameter. Its sepals are elliptic to rounded in character. Its petals are egg-shaped to rounded in character.

== Taxonomy ==
- Corynocarpaceae
  - - - C. rupestris
      - C. cribbianus
  - - C. laevigatus
    - C. similis
    - C. dissimilis

Cladogram showing the relationship of the species within the sole genus in the family Corynocarpaceae.

Corynocarpus dissimilis was first described by British botanist William Hemsley in 1904 in his revision of the Corynocarpus genus. C. dissimilis differs from C. laevigatus and C. similis by its much smaller leaves and flowers.

Corynocarpus dissimilis is the only member of the Corynocarpus genus that is endemic to New Caledonia. Corynocarpus species are found across the Pacific Islands and Australia, including: C. similis in Vanuatu, C. cribbianus in North Queensland and New Guinea, C. laevigatus in New Zealand, and C. rupestris in the Australian states of New South Wales and Queensland. In a 2000 study, rbcL sequencing reaveled that the species is most closely related to C. laevigatus and C. similis. C. dissimilis emerged approximately 5 million years ago.

=== Etymology ===
The etymology (word origin) of the genus name Corynocarpus derives from the Greek koryne, meaning 'club', and carpus, meaning 'fruit', translating in English to 'club fruit'. The specific epithet (second part of the scientific name), dissimilis, is a Latin word meaning 'different' or 'unlike'. It can also mean "not the same as the others". It is unclear why Hemsley chose this as the specific epithet since he does not provide an explanation.

== Distribution ==
Corynocarpus dissimilis is endemic to New Caledonia, where it is commonly found across the main island of Grande Terre and also occurs on Lifou in the Loyalty Islands. It is commonly found in dense humid and dry forests, reaching 1,200 m (4,000 ft) above sea level at maximum elevation. C. dissimilis's conservation status was assessed by the IUCN Red List in 2021 as "Least Concern", and its population trend was evaluated as "Unknown".

== Works cited ==
Books

- Gledhill, David (2008). The Names of Plants. Cambridge, United Kingdom: Cambridge University Press. ISBN 978-0-521-68553-5.
- Harris, Warwick; Kapoor, Promila (1990). Nga Mahi Maori O Te Wao Nui a Tane. Christchurch, New Zealand: Botany Division. ISBN 0-477-02579-X.

Journals

- Atherton, Ra; Lockhart, Pj; McLenachan, Pa; de Lange, Pj; Wagstaff, Sj; Shepherd, Ld (2015). "A molecular investigation into the origin and relationships of karaka/kōpi (Corynocarpus laevigatus) in New Zealand". Journal of the Royal Society of New Zealand. 45 (4): 212–220. doi:10.1080/03036758.2015.1093006. ISSN 0303-6758.
- Hemsley, W. Botting (1903). "On the Genus Corynocarpus, Forst., with Descriptions of two New Species". Annals of Botany. os-17 (4): 743–760. doi:10.1093/oxfordjournals.aob.a088941. ISSN 1095-8290.
- McAlpine, Kate G.; Cory, Sally; Cox, Bart Te Manihera; McLeod (Taranaki Whānui), Terese; Rapson, Gillian; Roskruge (Te Ātiawa, Ngāti Tama), Nick Rahiri; Shepherd, Lara D. (5 September 2024). "Karaka (Corynocarpus laevigatus): native taonga (treasure) or environmental weed?". New Zealand Journal of Botany. Informa UK Limited: 1–26. doi:10.1080/0028825x.2024.2388751. ISSN 0028-825X.
- Wagstaff, Steven J.; Dawson, Murray I. (2000). "Classification, Origin, and Patterns of Diversification of Corynocarpus (Corynocarpaceae) Inferred from DNA Sequences". Systematic Botany. 25 (1). American Society of Plant Taxonomists: 134–149. doi:10.2307/2666679. ISSN 0363-6445. JSTOR 2666679.

Websites

- De Lange, Peter (15 January 2012). "Corynocarpus laevigatus". New Zealand Plant Conservation Network. Archived from the original on 9 May 2024.
- IUCN (2 May 2019). Corynocarpus dissimilis: Amice, R., Butin, J.-P., Cazé, H., Garnier, D., McCoy, S., Veillon, J.-M., Gâteblé, G., Fleurot, D., Laudereau, C., Suprin, B., Hequet, V., Bruy, D. & Vandrot, H.: The IUCN Red List of Threatened Species 2020: e.T178657145A179189849 (Report). doi:10.2305/iucn.uk.2020-3.rlts.t178657145a179189849.en.
