= Hadacidin =

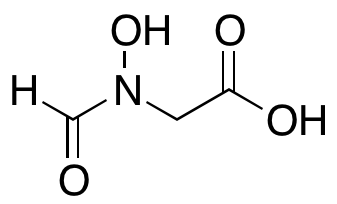

Names
- IUPAC name N-Formyl-N-hydroxyglycine
- Systematic IUPAC name (N-Hydroxyformamido)acetic acid

Identifiers
CAS Number	689-13-4
3D model (JSmol)	Interactive image
ChemSpider	12194
PubChem CID	12717
UNII	BFO5P1010A
CompTox Dashboard (EPA)	DTXSID1043962
- InChI: InChI=1S/C3H5NO4/c5-2-4(8)1-3(6)7/h2,8H,1H2,(H,6,7) Key: URJHVPKUWOUENU-UHFFFAOYSA-N; InChI=1/C3H5NO4/c5-2-4(8)1-3(6)7/h2,8H,1H2,(H,6,7) Key: URJHVPKUWOUENU-UHFFFAOYAD
- SMILES: C(C(=O)O)N(C=O)O

Properties
Chemical formula	C_{3}H_{5}NO_{4}
Molar mass	119.076 g·mol^{−1}
- Except where otherwise noted, data are given for materials in their standard state (at 25 °C [77 °F], 100 kPa). Infobox references

Hadacidin, and hadacidin analogues, have anticancer activity and activity against adenylosuccinate synthetase.

Hadacidin is the simplest known naturally occurring hydroxamic acid. The hydroxylamino group is frequently donated by a hydroxylamino acid such as 8-N-hydroxyornithine of the siderochromes. This compound, first isolated and characterized by Kaczka et al. in 1962, seemed well suited for a study of the route of hydroxamic acid biosynthesis. The hydroxamate bond may be considered to be a peptide bond with an oxygen atom on the amide nitrogen, but there is no a priori reason to decide whether the oxygen atom is introduced before or after the formation of the amide bond. In the latter case, formylglycine would be an intermediate in hadacidin biosynthesis. N-Hydroxylation of an amide bond was reported by Cramer et al. (1960), who found that N-hydroxy-2-acetylaminofluorene was formed in the intact rat upon administration of 2-acetylaminofluorene. Nevertheless, this finding cannot be considered direct proof of N-hydroxylation of an amide bond because, as the authors point out, the acetyl group is labile in their experiments, and hydroxylation of the amino group might have occurred.

Glycine, formate, and the 2-carbon of serine were all found to be very quickly incorporated into hadacidin during its synthesis by Penicillium aurantioviolaceum. The experiment showed that C-1 of glycine was found almost exclusively in the glycyl portion of hadacidin while formate, the 3-carbon of serine, and the 2-carbon of glycine were incorporated into both the glycyl and formyl portions of the hydroxamate. N-Hydroxyglycine was incorporated into hadacidin at a rate equal to that for glycine in 3-hr periods and to a much greater extent in longer time periods. N-Hydroxyglycine, but not glycine, brought about a net stimulation of hydroxamate production. Nitroacetic acid, glyoxylic acid oxime, and formylglycine were not rapidly incorporated into hadacidin. Experiments showed that the hydroxylamino oxygen atom of hadacidin is derived from oxygen gas rather than water. The experimental results are consistent with the hypothesis that the biosynthesis of hadacidin occurs by N-oxygenation of glycine to yield N-hydroxyglycine followed by N-formylation to yield the hydroxamate.
