= Nitroacetic acid =

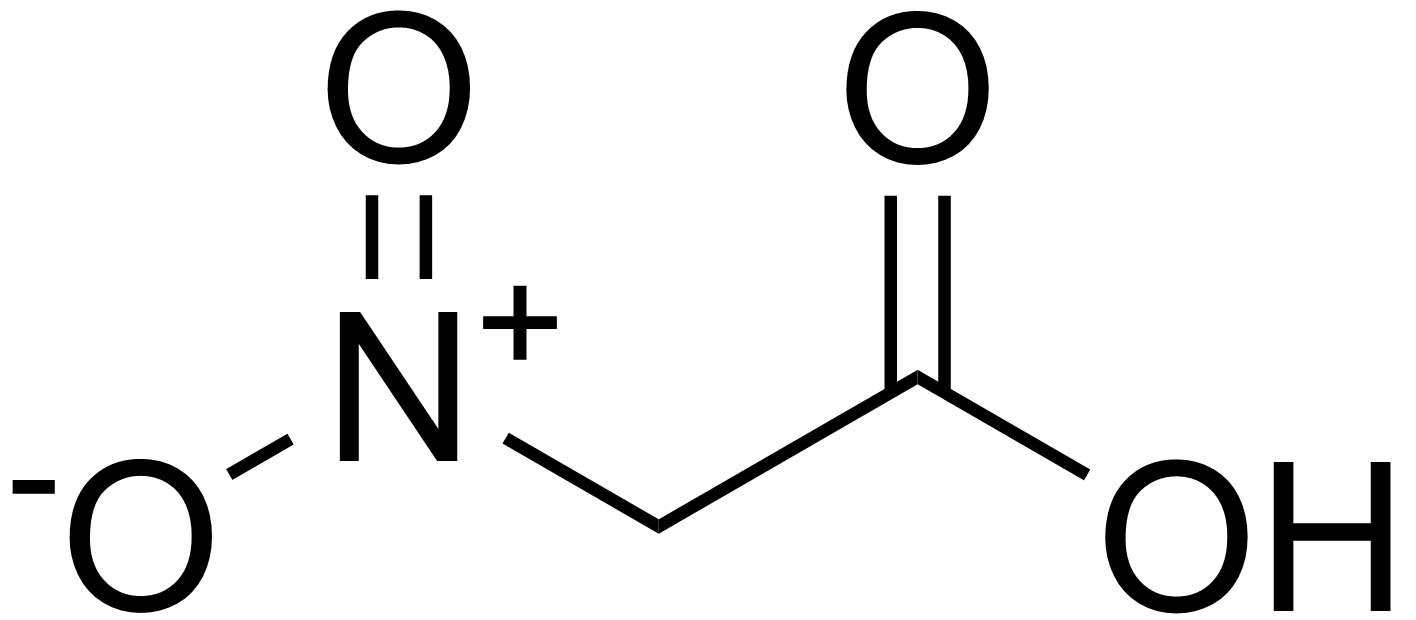

Names
- Preferred IUPAC name Nitroacetic acid
- Other names Nitro acetate

Identifiers
CAS Number	625-75-2
3D model (JSmol)	Interactive image
ChEMBL	ChEMBL571463
ChemSpider	39723
ECHA InfoCard	100.249.741
PubChem CID	43581
UNII	6CMX4X7N84
CompTox Dashboard (EPA)	DTXSID5058519
- InChI: InChI=1S/C2H3NO4/c4-2(5)1-3(6)7/h1H2,(H,4,5) Key: RGHXWDVNBYKJQH-UHFFFAOYSA-N; InChI=1/C2H3NO4/c4-2(5)1-3(6)7/h1H2,(H,4,5) Key: RGHXWDVNBYKJQH-UHFFFAOYAA
- SMILES: C(C(=O)O)[N+](=O)[O-]

Properties
Chemical formula	C_{2}H_{3}NO_{4}
Molar mass	105.049 g·mol^{−1}
Density	1.5±0.1 g/cm3
Acidity (pK_{a})	1.68

Hazards
Flash point	150.6±11.1 °C
- Except where otherwise noted, data are given for materials in their standard state (at 25 °C [77 °F], 100 kPa). verify (what is ?) Infobox references

Nitroacetic acid is the chemical compound with the formula (NO_{2})CH_{2}CO_{2}H. This substituted carboxylic acid is used as a potential precursor to nitromethane, commonly used as a fuel in drag racing and as an organic reagent in chemical synthesis.

== Synthesis ==
Nitroacetic acid can be synthesized by adding cold chloroacetic acid into a cold, slightly alkaline aqueous solution, followed by mixing with aqueous sodium nitrite solution. It is important during this procedure not to make the solution too alkaline and to keep it cold to prevent the formation of sodium glycolate.

== Reactions ==
Nitroacetic acid can be used in the production of nitromethane by thermal decarboxylation of a corresponding salt to at 80 °C.
