= 3-Nitropropionic acid =

β-Nitropropionic acid
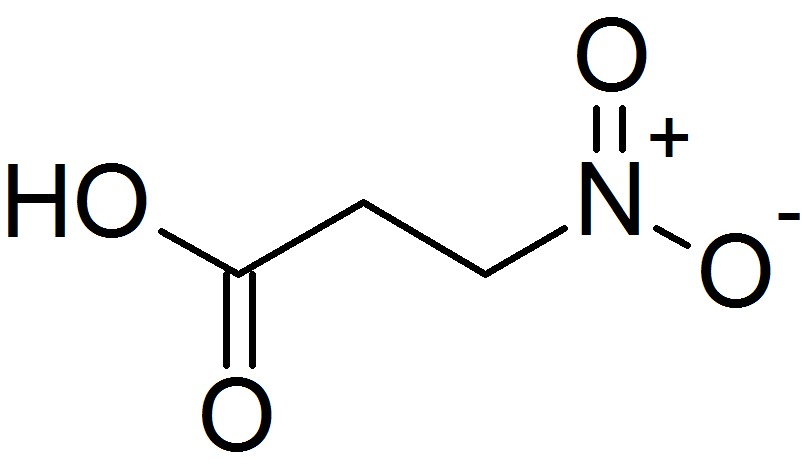

Names
- Preferred IUPAC name 3-Nitropropanoic acid
- Other names 3-NPA β-Nitropropionic acid Hiptagenic acid Bovinocidin

Identifiers
CAS Number	504-88-1
3D model (JSmol)	Interactive image
ChemSpider	1615
ECHA InfoCard	100.007.276
PubChem CID	1678
UNII	QY4L0FOX0D
CompTox Dashboard (EPA)	DTXSID1020982
- InChI: InChI=1S/C3H5NO4/c5-3(6)1-2-4(7)8/h1-2H2,(H,5,6) Key: WBLZUCOIBUDNBV-UHFFFAOYSA-N
- SMILES: C(C[N+](=O)[O-])C(=O)O

Properties
Chemical formula	C_{3}H_{5}NO_{4}
Molar mass	119.076 g·mol^{−1}
Melting point	65–67 °C (149–153 °F; 338–340 K)
- Except where otherwise noted, data are given for materials in their standard state (at 25 °C [77 °F], 100 kPa). Infobox references

3-Nitropropionic acid (3-NPA) is a mycotoxin which is severely toxic to humans. It is a potent suicidal inhibitor of succinate dehydrogenase, an enzyme in the citric acid cycle and mitochondrial energy chain. Mild cases of exposure give rise to nausea, vomiting, and stomach ache, while severe cases lead to brain damage or death. There is no known antidote to 3-nitropropionic acid poisoning.

3-nitropropionic acid is produced by a number of fungi, most notably in the Aspergillus family, and may be found in food such as in sugar cane as well as Japanese fungally fermented staples, including miso, soy sauce, katsuobushi, coconuts and some traditional Chinese medicines. Several outbreaks of 3-nitropropionic acid poisoning have been linked to contamination of shared food crops, particularly in China, where sugar cane is commonly consumed by children.

== Health effects ==
=== Mechanism of action ===
3-nitroprionionic acid has a similar molecular structure to the biological molecule succinate, a component of the tricarboxylic acid cycle. As such, 3-nitropropionic acid is able to competitively and irreversibly bind to the flavin component of the succinate dehydrogenase enzyme. Suicidal deactivation by 3-nitropropionic acid permanently disables affected enzymes from catalysing the oxidation of succinate to fumarate. This inhibition interrupts the synthesis of the energy biomolecule adenosine triphosphate (ATP) and triggers energy depletion and oxidative stress in affected cells.

3-nitroprionionic also decreases the activity of Monoamine oxidase (MAO). The mechanism is that 3-nitroprionionic induces reactive oxygen species and oxidizes dopamine generating dopamine-quinones which can reduce the activity of MAO-A.

=== Symptoms ===
Neuronal death can occur, inducing severe neuromuscular disorders and damage to brain matter, spinal tracts, and the nervous system. Late onset muscle dystonia and neurodegeneration of the caudate putamen have been observed in humans who were exposed to 3-nitropropionic acid. A study on rats further observed dopamine toxicity alongside acute encephalopathy and dystonia.

=== Use in medical research ===
Recent studies have found that because 3-nitropropionic acid is a mitochondrial toxin, it can produce striatal alterations in rats similar to those observed in the brain of Huntington's disease (HD) patients. As such, 3-nitropropionic acid has been used as an animal model for HD and other such neurodegenerative diseases. Administration of the cannabinoid receptor agonist WIN55212-2 to rats for six consecutive days, before acid dosage, exerted preventive effects on all alterations elicited by the toxin, like mitochondrial dysfunction and lipid peroxidation, by activation of the CB1 receptor.

== In nature ==
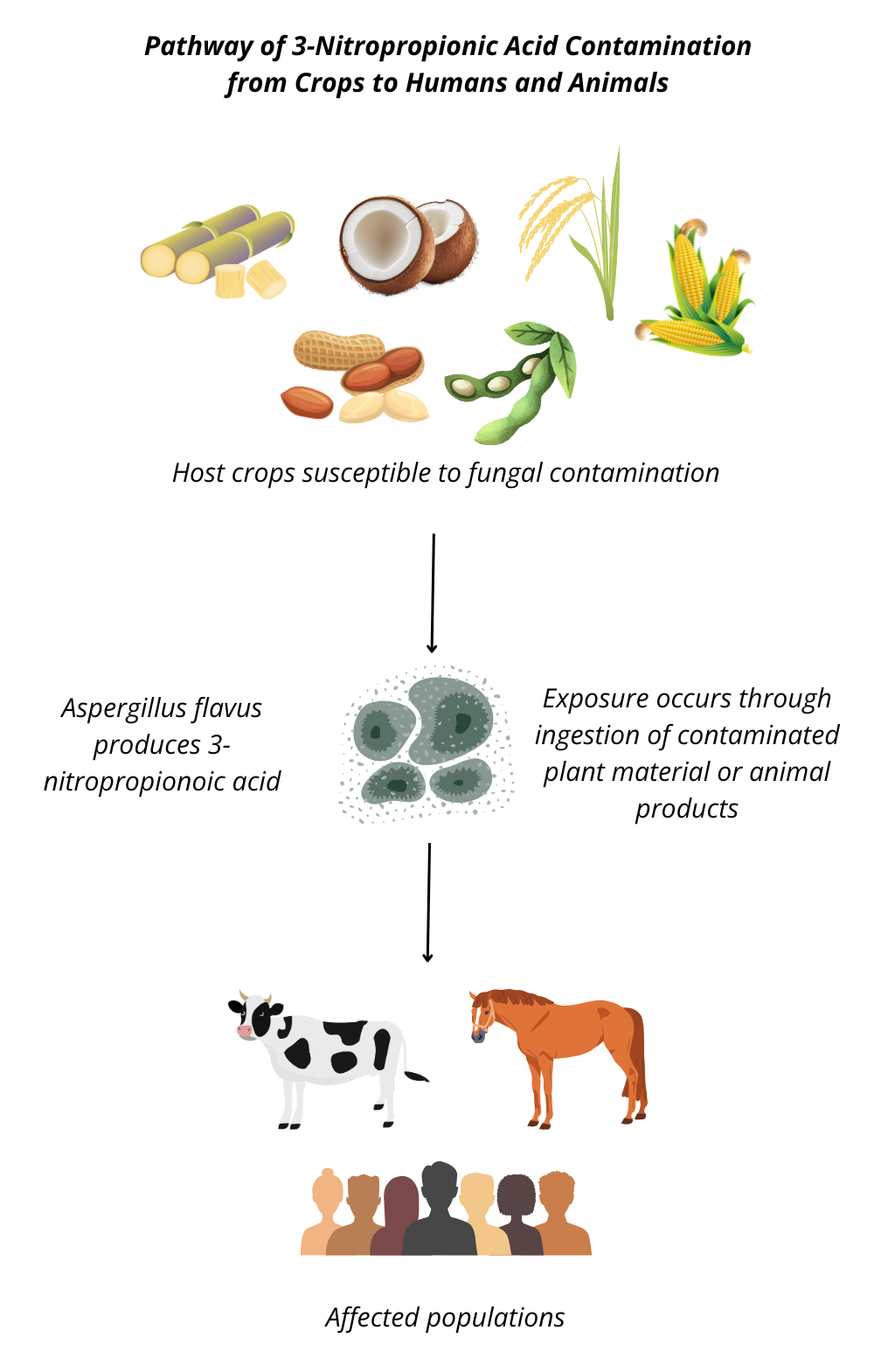
This diagram illustrates the contamination pathway of 3-nitropropionic acid (3-NPA), a mycotoxin produced by Aspergillus flavus. Crops such as sugarcane, coconuts, peanuts, soybeans, rice, and maize serve as host substrates for fungal growth. Once contaminated, these crops can transmit 3-NPA to humans and animals through direct consumption or through derived animal products.

=== Natural occurrence in food crops ===
As a mycotoxin, 3-nitropropionic acid is naturally produced by some fungi that infest plants and vegetables. These fungi include Aspergillus flavus, Aspergilllus parasiticus, and of the genus Arthrinium, which grow in soil, decaying vegetation, hay, and grains, and are therefore able to contaminate grains before harvest and in storage. According to the World Health Organization, some of the crops that are commonly affected by Aspergillus and Arthrinium fungi include:

- Cereals (corn, sorghum, wheat, rice)
- Oilseeds (soybean, peanut, sunflower and cotton seeds)
- Spices (chili peppers, black pepper, coriander, turmeric and ginger)
- Tree nuts (pistachio, almond, walnut, coconut and Brazil nuts

Extreme weather, stressed crop growth conditions, as well as storage conditions (like moisture) give rise to conditions suitable for 3-nitropropionic acid formation in food crops.

== Notable cases ==
=== Mouldy coconut poisoning in Denmark ===
Fatal 3-NPA poisoning as a result of drinking coconut water has been reported in a case where a pre-prepared coconut had been stored at room temperature for a month, instead of being refrigerated.

=== Unexpected 3-NPA identification by LC–MS in Norway ===
The first reported case of human 3-NPA intoxication in Norway, and the first published human liquid chromatography–mass spectrometry (LC–MS)–based metabolomics study of 3-NPA poisoning worldwide, involved a Norwegian boy with an unknown source of intoxication who was initially suspected of having a mitochondrial disorder. In addition to detecting a large number of altered metabolites, the study identified protective mechanisms that may attenuate the toxic effects of 3-NPA, evidence of increased oxidative stress, and disruption of energy metabolism. The results of the study led to a revision of the toxicological screening panel in Norway, with 3-NPA added to the list of tested compounds.

== See also ==
- Bongkrek acid, a mycotoxin with similar notable incidents of poisoning via contaminated coconuts
- Karakin, a toxic plant glucoside which is metabolised to 3-nitropropionic acid
