= Māngere Bridge (suburb) =

Suburb of Auckland in New Zealand

- Suburb
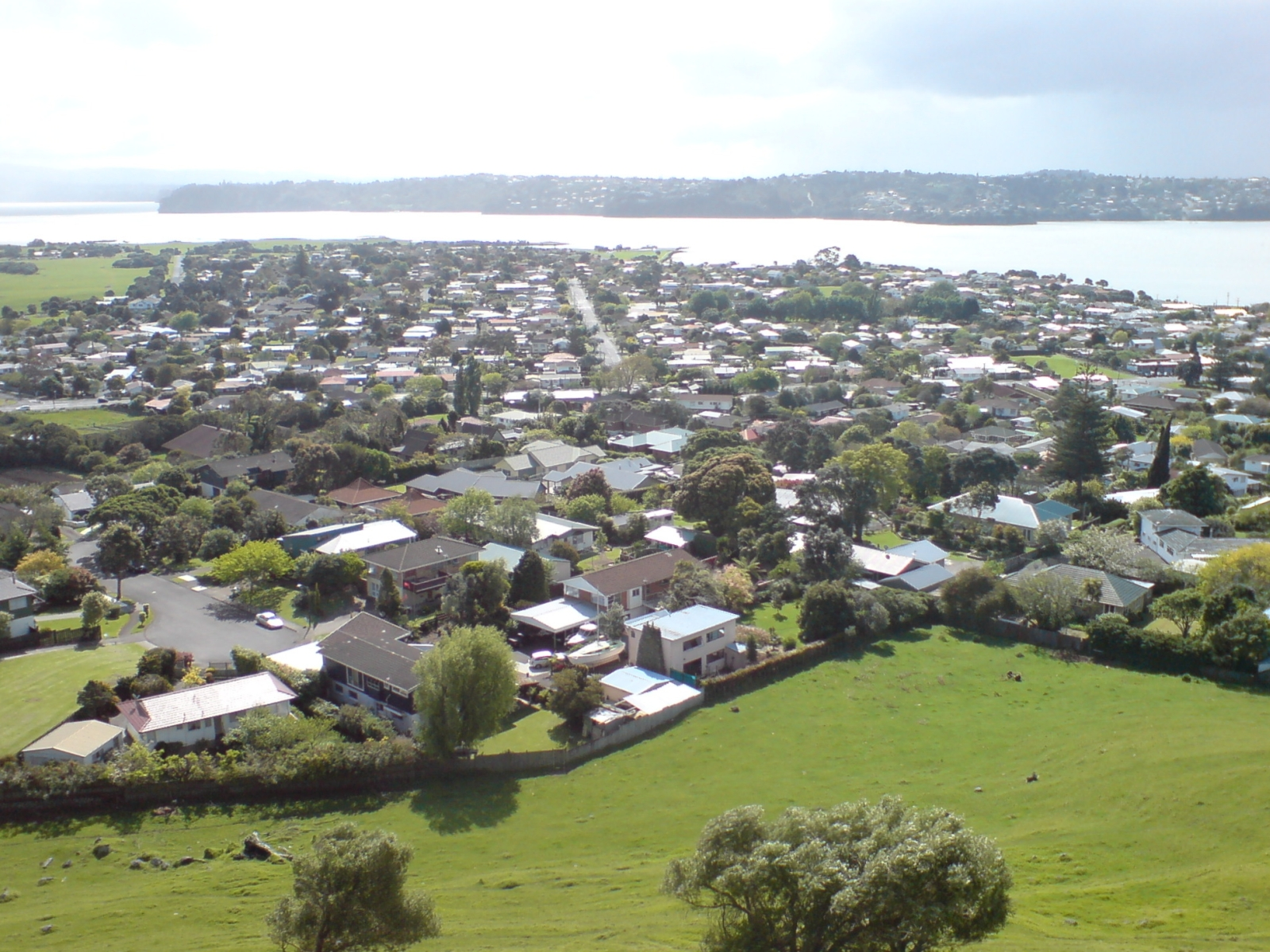
- Western part of the suburb seen from Māngere Mountain.
- Interactive map of Māngere Bridge
- Coordinates: 36°56′36″S 174°47′5″E
- Country: New Zealand
- City: Auckland
- Local authority: Auckland Council
- Electoral ward: Manukau ward
- Local board: Māngere-Ōtāhuhu Local Board

Area
  - Land: 645 ha (1,590 acres)

Population (June 2025)
  - Total: 11,760
  - Density: 1,820/km^{2} (4,720/sq mi)

(Manukau Harbour)	Onehunga (Māngere Inlet)	(Māngere Inlet)
(Manukau Harbour)	Māngere Bridge	Favona
(Manukau Harbour)	Māngere	Favona

Māngere Bridge is a suburb of Auckland, New Zealand, under the local governance of the Auckland Council. Surrounded by the Manukau Harbour, the area is the most north-western suburb of South Auckland, and is connected to Onehunga in central Auckland by three bridges that cross the Māngere Inlet. Many features of the Auckland volcanic field are found in and around Māngere Bridge, including Māngere Mountain, a 106-metre-high (348 ft) feature in the centre of the suburb, and Māngere Lagoon, a volcanic tidal lagoon opposite Puketutu Island in the harbour. The suburb is also home to Ambury Regional Park, a working farm and nature sanctuary run by Auckland Council, that connects to the Kiwi Esplanade and Watercare Coastal walkways.

After being inhabited for hundreds of years by Tāmaki Māori, the area became a Ngāti Mahuta settlement to provide defense of Auckland from the late 1840s until the invasion of the Waikato in 1863. From later in the 19th century, Māngere Bridge became an important rural area for supplying Auckland with produce and dairy, and from the 1920s it became a popular location for Chinese-run market gardens.

Māngere Bridge developed suburban housing in the 1950s and 1960s, experiencing growth helped by its proximity to Auckland Airport, which opened in 1966. After the closure of open-air wastewater-treatment ponds in the early 2000s, the part of the harbour surrounding Māngere Bridge underwent significant ecological restoration. The suburb is multicultural; many residents are large families, and the housing stock is dominated by brick-and-tile homes built in the 1960s and 1970s. In 2019, the suburb name was officially gazetted as Māngere Bridge.

== History ==
=== Māori history ===
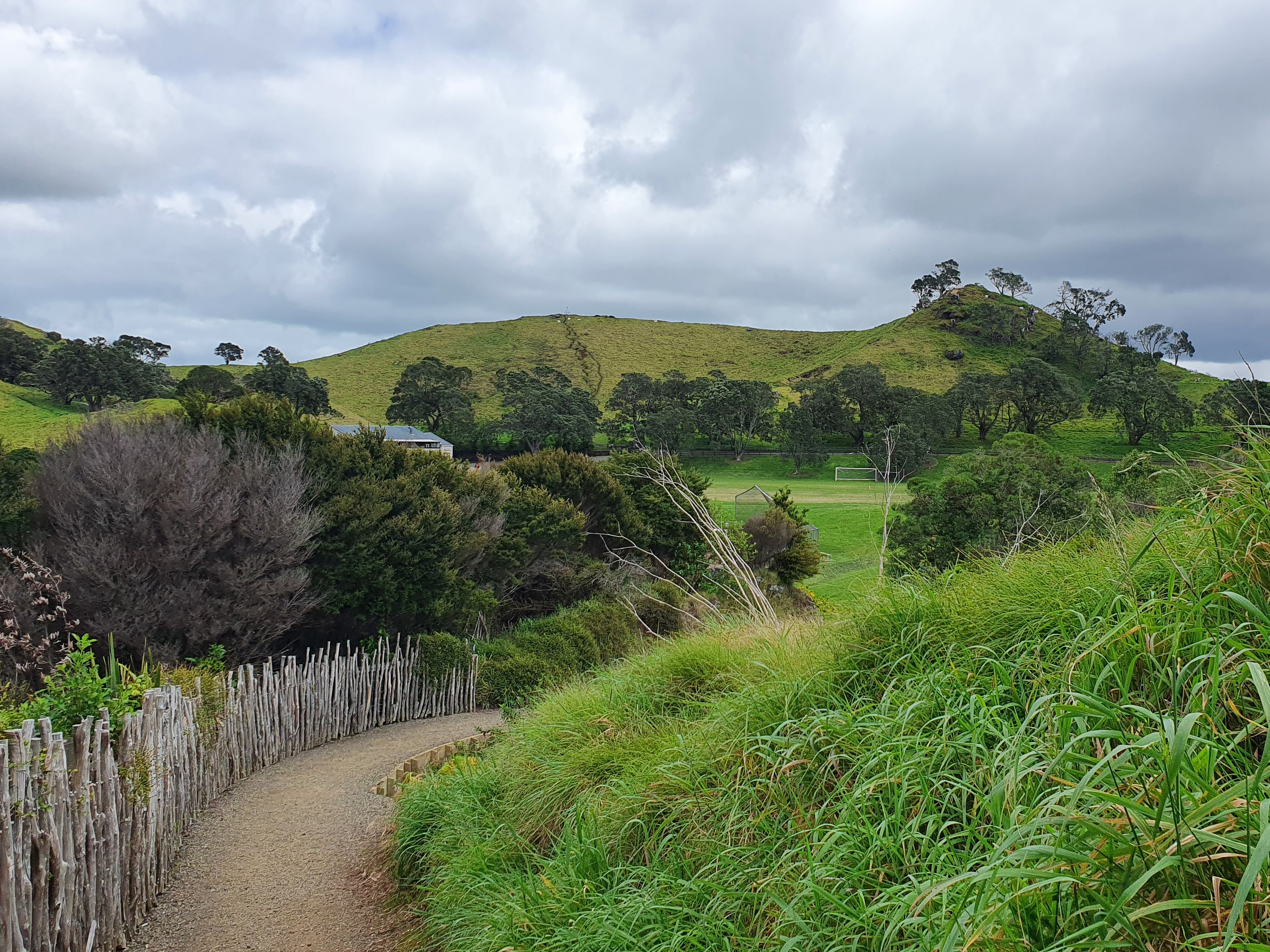
Māngere Mountain / Te Pane-o-Mataaho / Te Ara Pueru, an important pā for Waiohua in the 18th century and Ngāti Whātua in the early 19th century

Most of the land around Māngere Bridge is formed from lava flows from Te Pane o Mataaho / Māngere Mountain. Archaeological records date fishing activities in the area as far back as the 15th century. The Ambury Regional Park and Māngere Lagoon areas have around 100 recorded archaeological sites, including stoneworks and shell middens. The area closer to Māngere Mountain has fewer identified sites, likely as the result of modern developments destroying evidence of these.

In the early 18th century, Te Pane o Mataaho / Māngere Mountain was a major pā for the Waiohua, a confederacy of Tāmaki Māori iwi. The mountain complex may have been home to thousands of people, with the mountain acting as a central place for rua (food storage pits). Paramount chief Kiwi Tāmaki would stay at Māngere seasonally, when it was the time of year to hunt sharks in the Manukau Harbour. In the early 1740s, Kiwi Tāmaki was slain in battle by the Te Taoū hapū of Ngāti Whātua. After the battle, most Waiohua fled the region, although many of the remaining Waiohua warriors regrouped at Te Pane o Mataaho. The warriors strew pipi shells around the base of the mountain to warn against attacks, but Te Taoū warriors covered the pipi shells with dogskin cloaks to muffle the sound, and raided the pā at dawn. An alternate name for the mountain, Te Ara Pueru ("the dogskin cloak path"), references this event.

After the events of this war, Ngāti Whātua Ōrākei, a hapū created by the members of Te Taoū who remained near the Tāmaki isthmus, who intermarried with defeated members of Waiohua, settled the region. Originally the iwi were based on Maungakiekie / One Tree Hill, but after the death of paramount chief Tūperiri (circa 1795), the Māngere Bridge area and Onehunga became permanent kāinga (settlements) for Ngāti Whātua. The location was chosen because of the good quality soils for gardening, resources from the Manukau Harbour, and the area acting as a junction for surrounding trade routes. Māngere and Onehunga were considered a single settlement, as the Manukau Harbour was easily traversable by foot at low tide, connected by a natural basalt rock causeway, separated only by a narrow low tide stream. Residence at Māngere-Onehunga was seasonal, with most people travelling along fishing and gardening circuits in the region, returning to Māngere-Onehunga in the winter. A small number of permanent residents remained at Māngere-Onehunga, such as pig farmers. The land around Māngere Bridge area was predominantly used to grow kūmara (sweet potato) by Ngāti Whātua Ōrākei. Māngere-Onehunga remained the principal residence of Ngāti Whātua Ōrākei until the 1840s, before the iwi moved to Ōrākei.

=== Colonial period and land confiscation ===
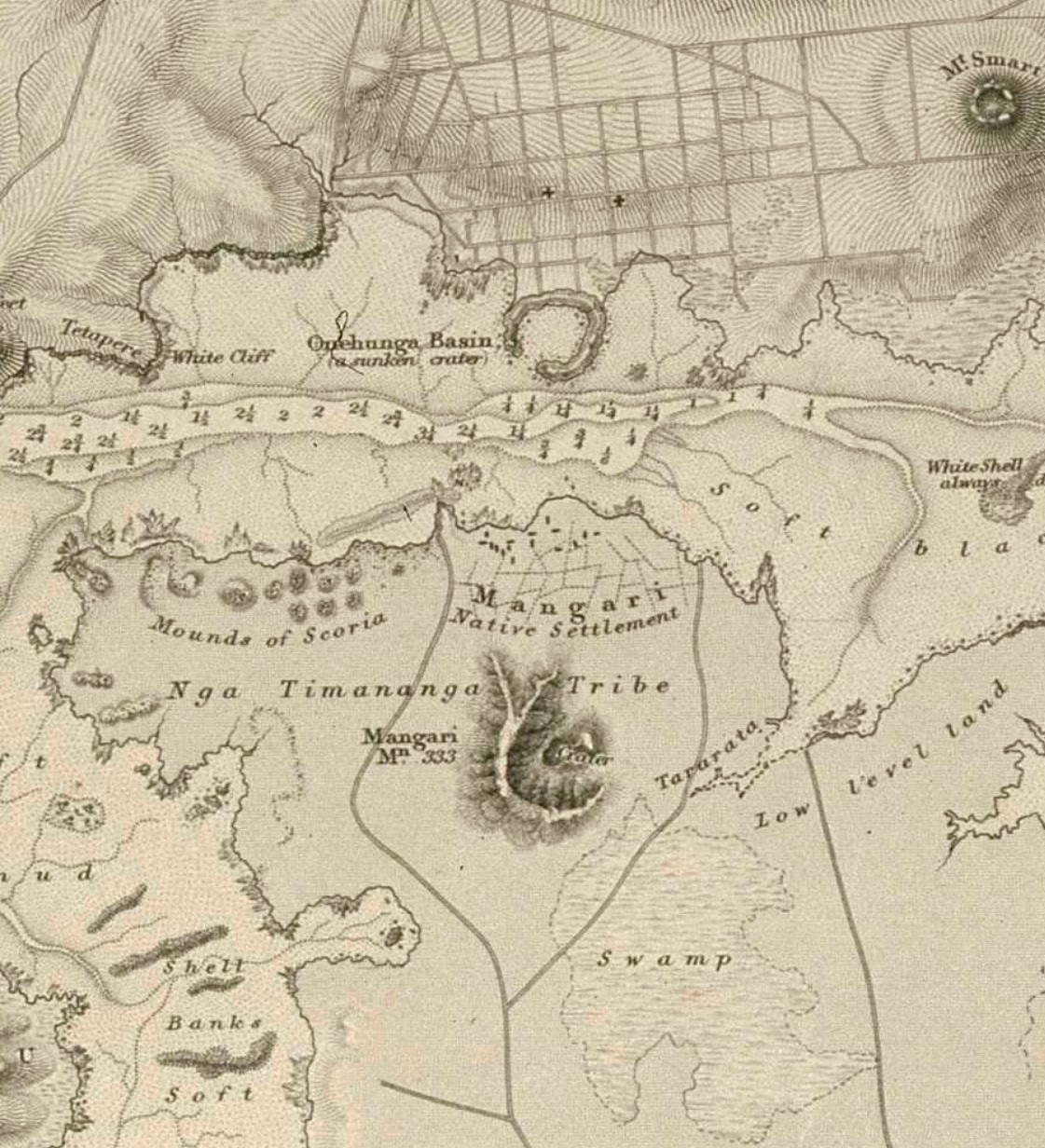
Māngere Bridge in 1853, showing the Ngāti Mahuta village and the European/Pākehā settlement at Onehunga

In the 1820s and early 1830s, the threat of Ngāpuhi raiders from the north during the Musket Wars caused most of the Tāmaki Makaurau area to become deserted. During this period, a peace accord between Ngāpuhi and Waikato Tainui was reached through the marriage of Matire Toha, daughter of Ngāpuhi chief Rewa was married to Kati Takiwaru, the younger brother of Tainui chief Pōtatau Te Wherowhero, and they settled together on the slopes of Māngere Mountain. Ngāti Whātua returned to the Māngere-Onehunga area by the mid-1830s, re-establishing a pā on Māngere Mountain called Whakarongo. In late 1837, members of Tainui iwi Ngāti Mahuta settled at Māngere Bridge, after receiving an offer from Ngāti Whātua to share land.

On 20 March 1840, Ngāti Whātua chief Apihai Te Kawau signed the Treaty of Waitangi at Ōrua Bay on the Manukau Harbour, inviting Lieutenant-Governor William Hobson to settle in Auckland, hoping this would protect the land and people living in Tāmaki Makaurau. In the winter of 1840, Ngāti Whātua Ōrākei moved the majority of the iwi to the Waitematā Harbour, with most iwi members resettling to the Remuera-Ōrākei area, closer to the new European settlement at Waihorotiu (modern-day Auckland CBD). A smaller Ngāti Whātua presence remained at Māngere-Onehunga, as well as members of Te Uringutu. In the late 1840s, Governor George Grey asked Pōtatau Te Wherowhero (then known as a powerful chief and negotiator, but later the first Māori King) to settle his people in the Māngere Bridge area to defend the township of Auckland, in an arrangement similar to the European Fencible Corps settlements on the outskirts of the Auckland township. Pōtatau Te Wherowhero and his people (known as the Māori Militia) settled near to the land where his brother Kati Takiwaru lived, an area of 190 hectares (480 acres) around the base of Māngere Mountain. The Māngere Bridge area was divided into 81 single-acre and 81 two-acre lots by the colonial government. In 1847, the first ferry service between Onehunga and Māngere Bridge was established by Mr Bradney, where passengers would raise a flag at Māngere Bridge to signal the ferry operator.

The 1850s were a prosperous time for the region. Māngere Bridge was settled by a mix of Waikato-Tainui, Ngāti Whatua, Waiohua-descendant tribes such as Te Ākitai Waiohua and a minority of European/Pākehā farmers. Māori from the Manukau Harbour and Waikato areas would bring goods to sell or barter with the European population, including goods such as peaches, melons, fish and potatoes. In 1858, Pōtatau Te Wherowhero relocated to Ngāruawāhia, with his role as tribal leader of the Māngere settlement taken up by Tāmati Ngāpora. In the late 1850s, the St James Anglican Church was constructed as a joint project between European settlers and the Ngāti Mahuta militia, using scoria taken from Māngere Mountain.

The prosperity was short-lived, as on 9 July 1863, due to fears of the Māori King Movement, Governor Grey proclaimed that all Māori living in the South Auckland area needed to swear loyalty to the Queen and give up their weapons. Most people refused due to strong links to Tainui, leaving for the south before the Government's Invasion of the Waikato. Six men remained in the Māngere area, in order to tend to the farms and for ahi kā (land rights through continued occupation). On 16 May 1865, the Ngāti Mahuta village at Māngere Bridge was seized under the New Zealand Settlements Act 1863. European settlers continued to live in the area, often looting the abandoned settlements. In 1867, the Native Compensation Court returned 144 of the original 485 acres that had been seized by the crown. The remaining land was kept by the crown as reserves, or sold on to settlers.

=== Opening of the bridge and dairy farming ===
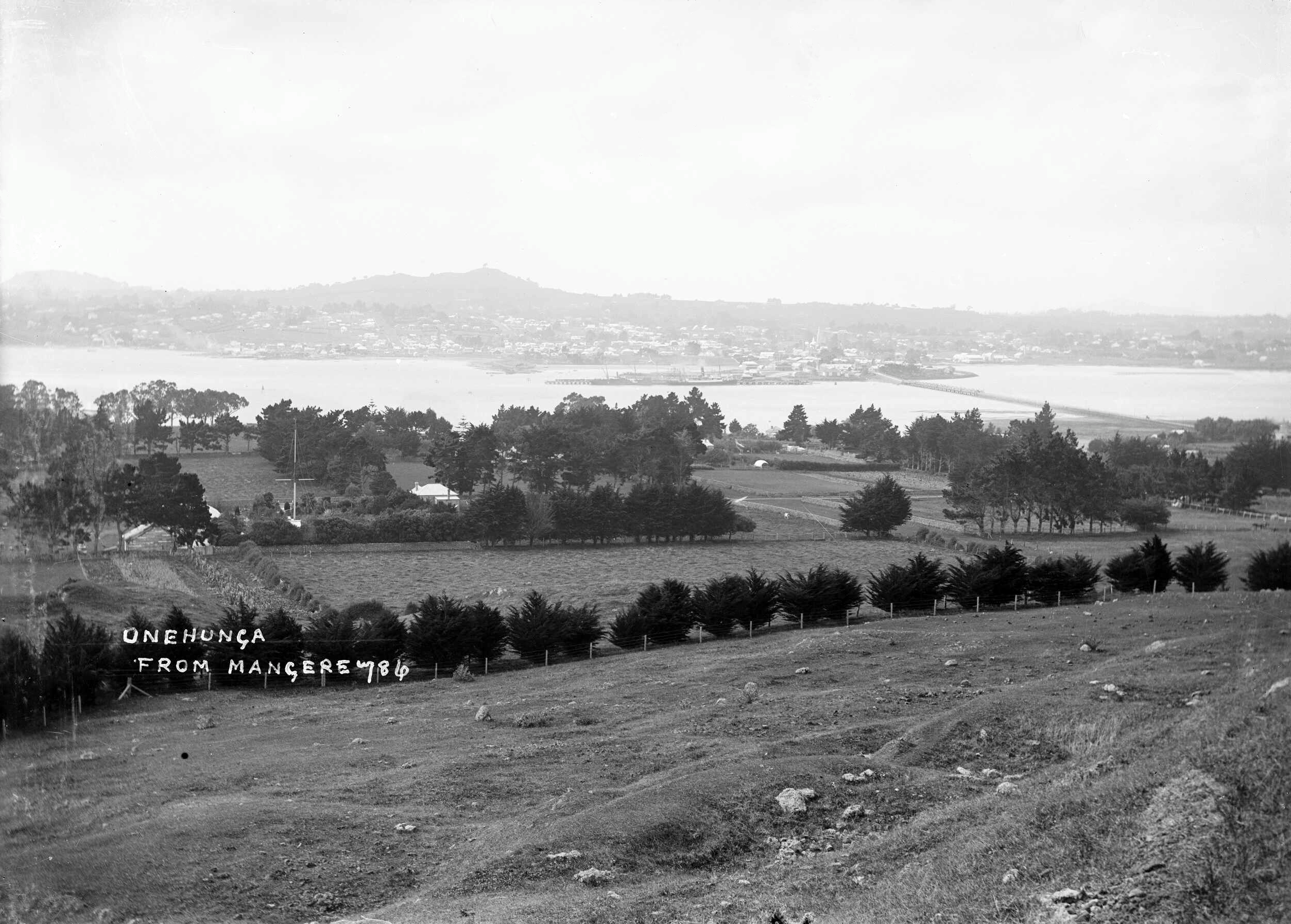
View from Māngere Mountain, looking towards Onehunga, c. 1910

Plans for a bridge spanning the Māngere Inlet began in 1866, when a company was formed to investigate a crossing between Māngere and Onehunga, funded by a grant provided by the Auckland provincial government. In 1872, a commission was created by the Auckland Provincial Council to investigate the creation of a bridge south of Onehunga. In 1875, the first Māngere Bridge was opened, leading to Māngere Bridge being one of the first areas of Māngere to develop suburban housing. In the latter 19th century, Māngere Bridge was well-known for wheat, and produced oats, barley, potatoes and cattle for the growing settlement of Auckland. The postal service reached Māngere Bridge in 1878, and by 1883 the first shop was operating at Māngere Bridge, on the corner of corner of Kiwi Esplanade and Coronation Road. 1886 saw the first post office open in Māngere Bridge, and in August 1890 the Māngere Bridge School opened (previously the Māngere Central School served the area). Further land was returned to Waikato tribes in 1890, where a cottage was built for King Tāwhiao, which housed family members of the king visiting Auckland, or family members being educated at schools in Auckland, such as Mahuta Tāwhiao, Tumate Mahuta and Tonga Mahuta.

From the late 1880s, Māngere Bridge was one of the largest dairy suppliers to the city of Auckland. In October 1887, Ambury and English Ltd opened a dairy factory in the area, supplying milk from the dairy farms (which includes modern day Ambury Regional Park, and farms along Wallace Road and Creamery Road) to their stores on Karangahape Road and Ponsonby Road. The creamery closed in 1937, and in 1943 operations were sold to the New Zealand Co-operative Dairy Company.

=== Chinese market gardens and suburbanisation ===
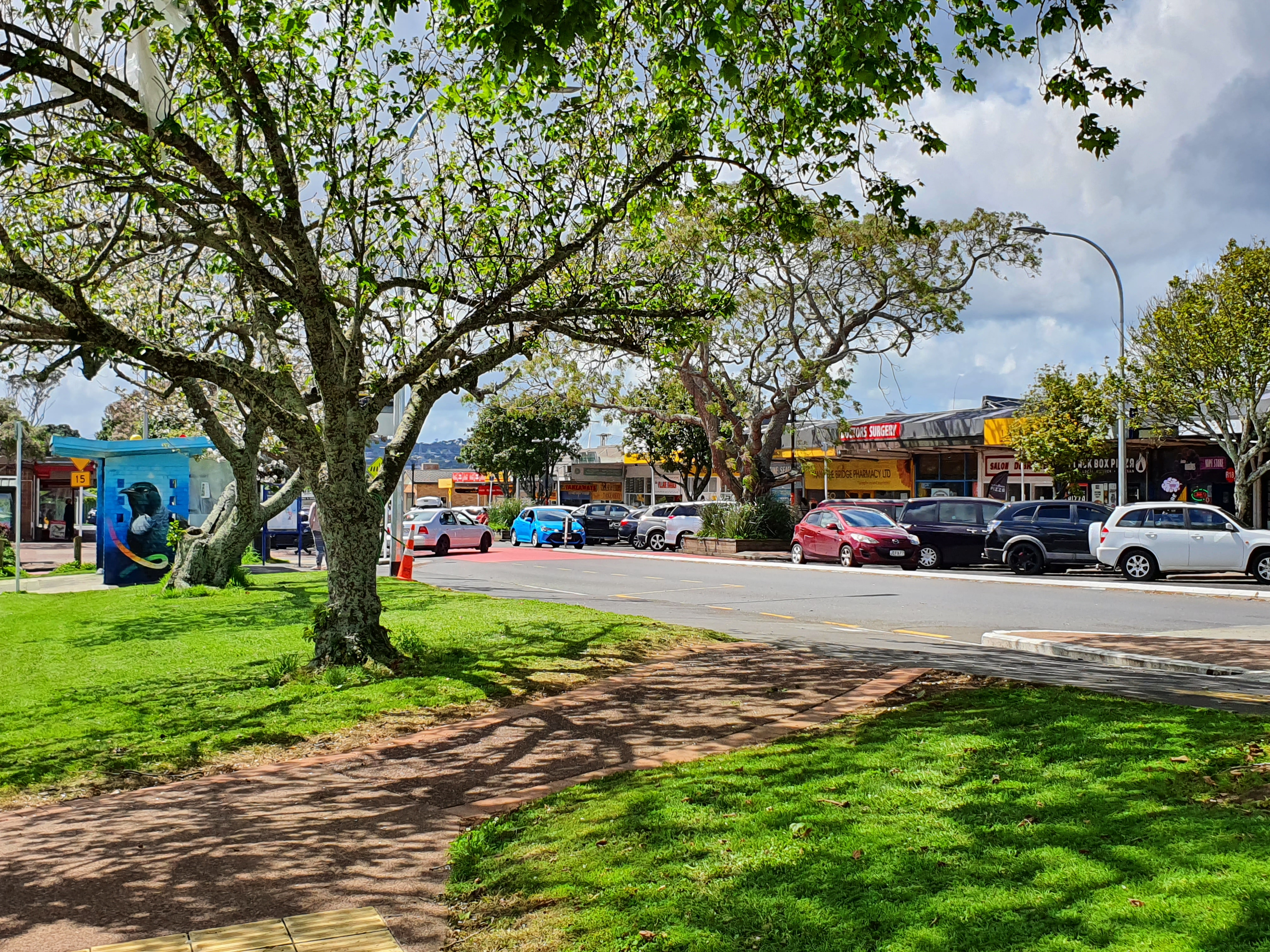
The Māngere Bridge Village, which developed in the 1950s and 1960s

In 1915, a new, wider bridge across the Manukau Harbour was opened, after the original was declared unsafe and closed the previous year. The first Chinese New Zealanders arrived in the area in 1915, and ten years later the first freehold land was sold to a Chinese buyer. Between the 1920s and 1940s, a large proportion of the area was used for Chinese-owned and operated market gardens. By 1954, over half of the registered market gardens in the Māngere-Onehunga area were run by Chinese families. Other employers in the area included a quarry established at Taylor Road in the mid-1920s (running until 1963), rope works, and a dancehall and tearooms called the Oriental Rendezvous, which was built on the waterfront and became a regular fixture of Auckland nightlife until it burnt down in 1932. In 1932, a water reservoir was constructed atop Māngere Mountain, and in the late 1930s the area was electrified.

In the 1950s, the area changed from mostly rural to suburban, as Māngere Bridge was developed for housing, extending west past Seaforth Avenue in 1959. The Māngere Bridge town centre began to develop in the 1950s and 1960s (mostly undeveloped until this time, due to the close proximity of the shops in Onehunga), during which the first banks were built in the suburb. In 1954, Māngere Bridge formed as a county town within the Manukau County Council, and in 1965 it became a suburb of the newly formed Manukau City. In 1965, the Te Puea Memorial Marae was opened, later becoming a temporary refuge to help combat growing homelessness in New Zealand. The area saw significant increase in traffic after the opening of the Auckland Airport in 1966.

=== Māngere sewage ponds, new bridges and the Southwestern Motorway ===
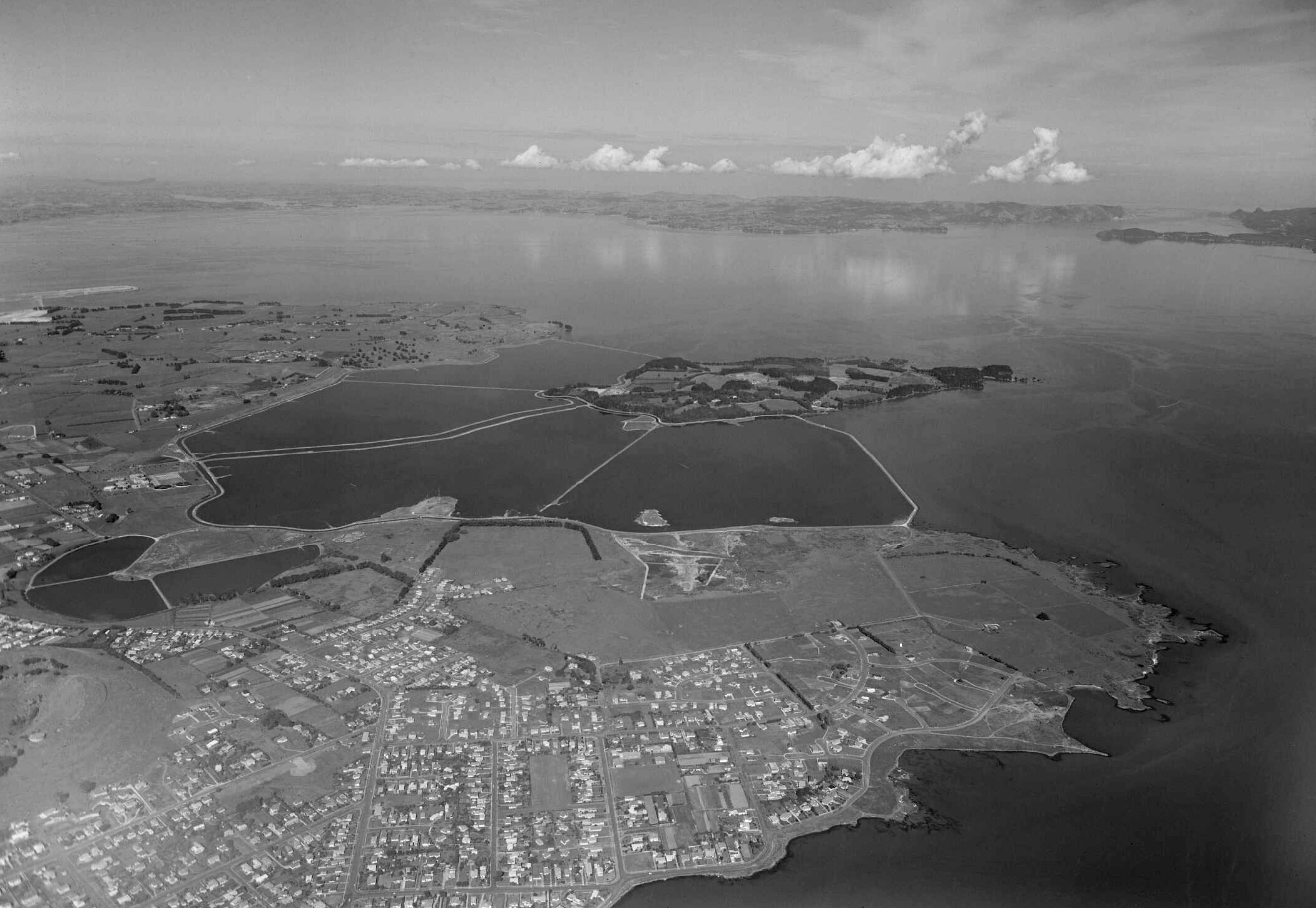
The former oxidation ponds at Māngere Lagoon and Puketutu Island in 1972

In 1960, the Manukau Sewage Purification Works (now Māngere Wastewater Treatment Plant) was opened, using an algae-based system to process the waste for the majority of the Auckland region with oxidation ponds in the Manukau Harbour and Māngere Lagoon, extending outwards to Puketutu Island. The Manukau Harbour site was chosen in 1954 to replace the Ōkahu Bay sewage tanks (the site of modern-day Kelly Tarlton's Sea Life Aquarium). The Manukau Harbour became the preferred site after Dove-Myer Robinson lobbied against the planned Motukorea / Browns Island sewage plant. The ponds caused degradation to the environment of the harbour, destruction of traditional fishing grounds at the Oruarangi Creek, strong odours and swarms of Chironomus zealandicus (New Zealand midge) in the surrounding areas. The following year, the Māngere Residents' Protest Committee was formed to seek improvements or compensation. The plant was upgraded in 1983, but odour and midge problems persisted in Māngere Bridge. In the early 2000s the oxidation ponds were decommissioned and the treatment plant upgraded to use ultraviolet lamps to disinfect the sewage. As a part of the pond closure process, work on the ecological restoration of the harbour and shoreline began, resulting in the construction of the Watercare Coastal Walkway and an increase in migratory wading birds returning to the harbour.

In 1970, planning began for State Highway 20 (commonly known as the Southwestern Motorway), an additional motorway connecting the Auckland CBD to Auckland Airport through Mount Roskill and Onehunga. Planning for this highway included a new motorway bridge to be built alongside the existing Māngere Bridge, and for the far eastern section of the suburb to be bisected by the new motorway. Construction on the bridge began in the mid 1970s. However, by May 1978, the construction halted when workers organised a labour strike over insufficient redundancy payments. The partially constructed bridge was picketed for a period of two and a half years, becoming the longest continuous labour strike in the history of New Zealand. The bridge was opened in 1983, and by 1984 State Highway 20 had extended south to Coronation Road, and to Massey Road by 1997. In 2010, a parallel motorway bridge over the Māngere Inlet was constructed, doubling the number of lanes to eight. The entire Western Ring Route project, connecting the Northwestern Motorway to the Southern Motorway was completed in 2017.

In November 2018, the old Māngere Bridge was closed due to safety issues. A new, curved, pedestrian and cycling bridge will open by late August 2022. The proposals for the City Centre-to-Māngere light rail project involve a stop at Māngere Bridge, which may also involve a new crossing of the Māngere Inlet, separate to the Māngere Bridge pedestrian bridge and motorway bridges. After the 2023 New Zealand general election, plans for light rail to Māngere were placed on hold.

In 2019, the name of the suburb was officially gazetted as Māngere Bridge, adding a macron to the suburb's name.

== Demographics ==
Māngere Bridge covers 6.45 km^{2} (2.49 sq mi) and had an estimated population of 11,760 as of June 2025, with a population density of 1,823 people per km^{2}.

Historical population
Year	Pop.	±% p.a.
2006	8,802	—
2013	9,261	+0.73%
2018	10,296	+2.14%
2023	10,839	+1.03%

Māngere Bridge had a population of 10,839 in the 2023 New Zealand census, an increase of 543 people (5.3%) since the 2018 census, and an increase of 1,578 people (17.0%) since the 2013 census. There were 5,346 males, 5,454 females and 42 people of other genders in 3,429 dwellings. 2.6% of people identified as LGBTIQ+. The median age was 35.2 years (compared with 38.1 years nationally). There were 2,496 people (23.0%) aged under 15 years, 2,079 (19.2%) aged 15 to 29, 4,830 (44.6%) aged 30 to 64, and 1,434 (13.2%) aged 65 or older.

People could identify as more than one ethnicity. The results were 51.0% European (Pākehā); 19.8% Māori; 37.0% Pasifika; 13.7% Asian; 1.1% Middle Eastern, Latin American and African New Zealanders (MELAA); and 1.2% other, which includes people giving their ethnicity as "New Zealander". English was spoken by 94.2%, Māori language by 4.7%, Samoan by 8.9%, and other languages by 17.9%. No language could be spoken by 2.6% (e.g. too young to talk). New Zealand Sign Language was known by 0.5%. The percentage of people born overseas was 27.6, compared with 28.8% nationally.

Religious affiliations were 48.0% Christian, 1.7% Hindu, 1.8% Islam, 1.5% Māori religious beliefs, 1.2% Buddhist, 0.3% New Age, 0.1% Jewish, and 0.8% other religions. People who answered that they had no religion were 37.1%, and 7.9% of people did not answer the census question.

Of those at least 15 years old, 2,079 (24.9%) people had a bachelor's or higher degree, 4,053 (48.6%) had a post-high school certificate or diploma, and 2,214 (26.5%) people exclusively held high school qualifications. The median income was $45,100, compared with $41,500 nationally. 1,212 people (14.5%) earned over $100,000 compared to 12.1% nationally. The employment status of those at least 15 was that 4,503 (54.0%) people were employed full-time, 942 (11.3%) were part-time, and 306 (3.7%) were unemployed.

Individual statistical areas
Name	Area (km^{2})	Population	Density (per km^{2})	Dwellings	Median age	Median income
Māngere Bridge Ambury	3.14	3,657	1,165	1,215	38.0 years	$49,700
Māngere Bridge	1.61	3,021	1,876	1,056	36.8 years	$44,400
Māngere Mountain View	1.70	4,161	2,448	1,158	32.1 years	$41,700
New Zealand					38.1 years	$41,500

== Landmarks and features ==
=== Notable buildings and sites ===
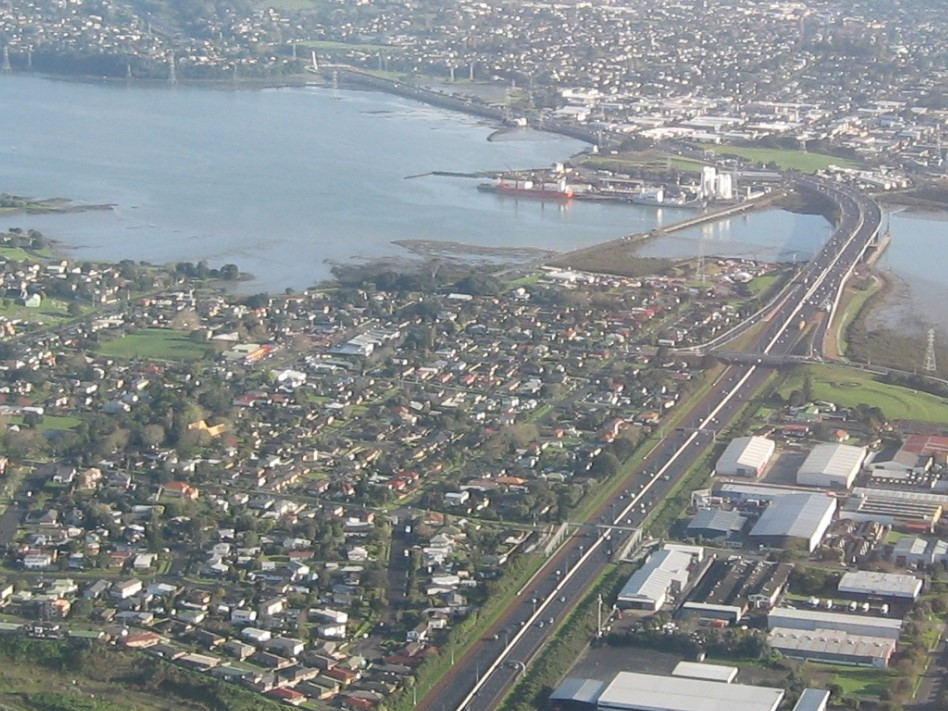
Māngere Bridge Village (centre left), with Māngere Bridges and Onehunga in the background

- Māngere Bridge Village. The commercial centre of the suburb, which developed in the 1950s and 1960s. The village holds weekly Sunday markets, and is the venue for the annual Māngere Bridge Santa Parade. The village includes the Māngere Bridge Library, opened in 1979 by member of parliament for Māngere, David Lange, and the Naomi and Bill Kirk Park (formerly the Coronation Road Reserve), named for local community figures who received Queen's Service Medals in 2009.
- Māngere Memorial Hall. A public hall opened in 1955, commemorating the soldiers who served in the First and Second World Wars.
- Māngere Mountain Education Centre. Established in 1995 through the work of Te Ākitai Waiohua kuia Mahia Wilson, the centre acts as a living museum. Members of Waiohua iwi impart traditional knowledge of storytelling, tool-making, traditional gardening and weaving to visitors. A house built in Māngere Bridge in the 1890s for use by Tāwhiao, the second Māori King, was relocated to the centre in 2017.
- St James Anglican Church. Opened on 1 January 1860 by George Selwyn, the church was built from scoria rock collected from Māngere Mountain, much of the work done by the Ngāti Mahuta Māori Militia led by Tāmati Ngāpora. The church was registered on 7 April 1983 by the New Zealand Historic Places Trust (now Heritage New Zealand) as a Category II historic place with registration number 689.
- Te Puea Memorial Marae. A tribal meeting ground for the Waikato Tainui hapū of Ngāti Kuiaarangi, Ngāti Mahuta, Ngāti Tai and Ngāti Whāwhākia. It includes a meeting house, also called Te Puea. The marae has helped hundreds of people find housing during the homelessness crisis, through a philosophy of manaakitanga.

=== Natural areas ===
- Ambury Regional Park. Opened as a regional park on 26 September 1987, the area is an archaeological site and working farm, which organises the annual Ambury Farm Day. Areas of the park are leased to the Māngere Pony Club, and the Ambury Park Centre for Riding Therapy, a charity which provides physiological and psychological therapy through horse riding. The Watercare Coastal Walkway, opened in 2005 after the removal of the oxidation ponds, links Ambury Regional Park to Ōtuataua Stonefields in the south.
- Kiwi Esplanade Walkway. A walkway extending along the Manukau Harbour from Ambury Regional Park to the Mangere Bridges. The shoreline features pāhoehoe flows; hot fluid lava that travelled up to 10 km/h from the Māngere Mountain eruption, approximately 50,000 years ago.
- Māngere Mountain / Te Pane-o-Mataaho / Te Ara Pueru. A volcano and pā site important to Waiohua and Ngāti Whātua Ōrākei history. The mountain was set aside as a public domain in 1890, for use as a water reservoir, a quarry, and for recreation.
- Māngere Lagoon. A volcanic maar and tidal lagoon, used as sewage oxidation ponds from 1959–2001, after which it was ecologically restored and form a part of the Watercare Coastal Walkway.
- Puketutu Island / Te Motu a Hiaroa. The first permanent home of the Tainui people in Aotearoa, after the Tainui waka was transported over the Te Tō Waka portage at Ōtāhuhu, from the Tāmaki River to the Manukau Harbour. In the 1950s and 1960s, four scoria cones on the island were quarried for use in public works projects such as Auckland Airport and the Manukau Sewage Purification Works. From 2014, the former site of the quarry has been the site of a Watercare Services project to recreate the quarried volcanic cones using biosolids from the Māngere Wastewater Treatment Plant. After the project's completion, the island will become a regional park and cultural centre.

=== Gallery ===
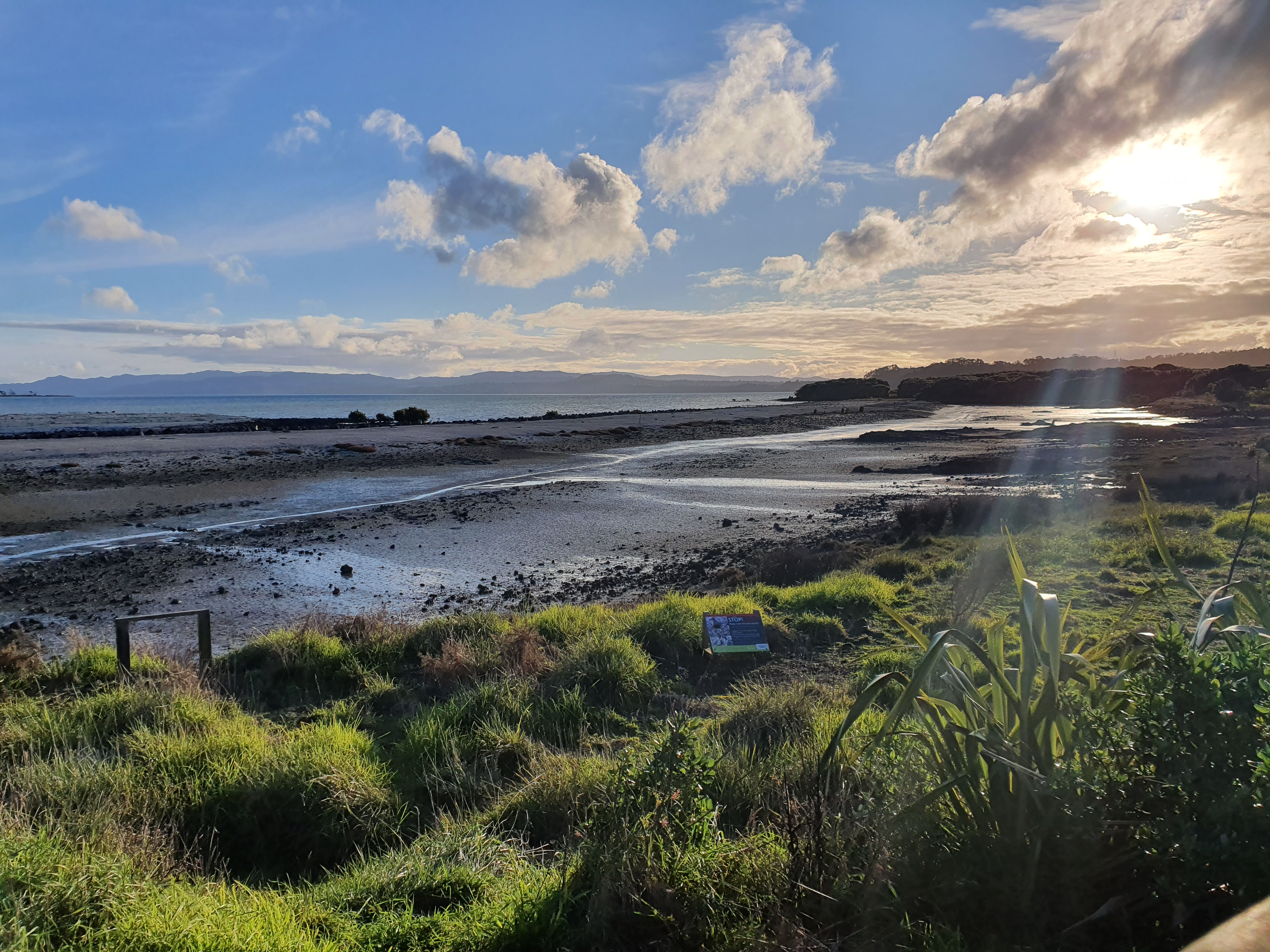
Nesting area for birds at Ambury Regional Park

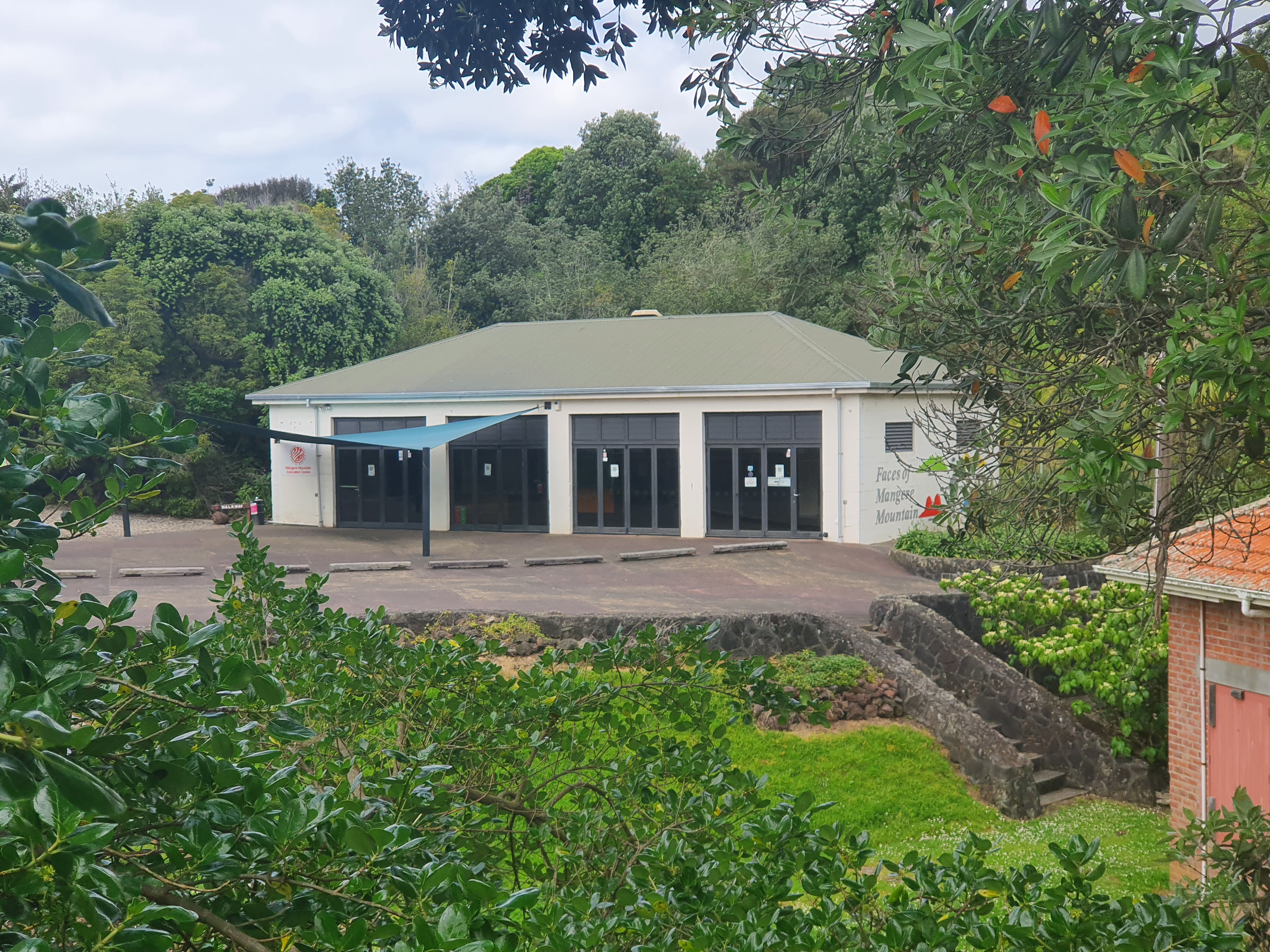
The Māngere Mountain Education Centre

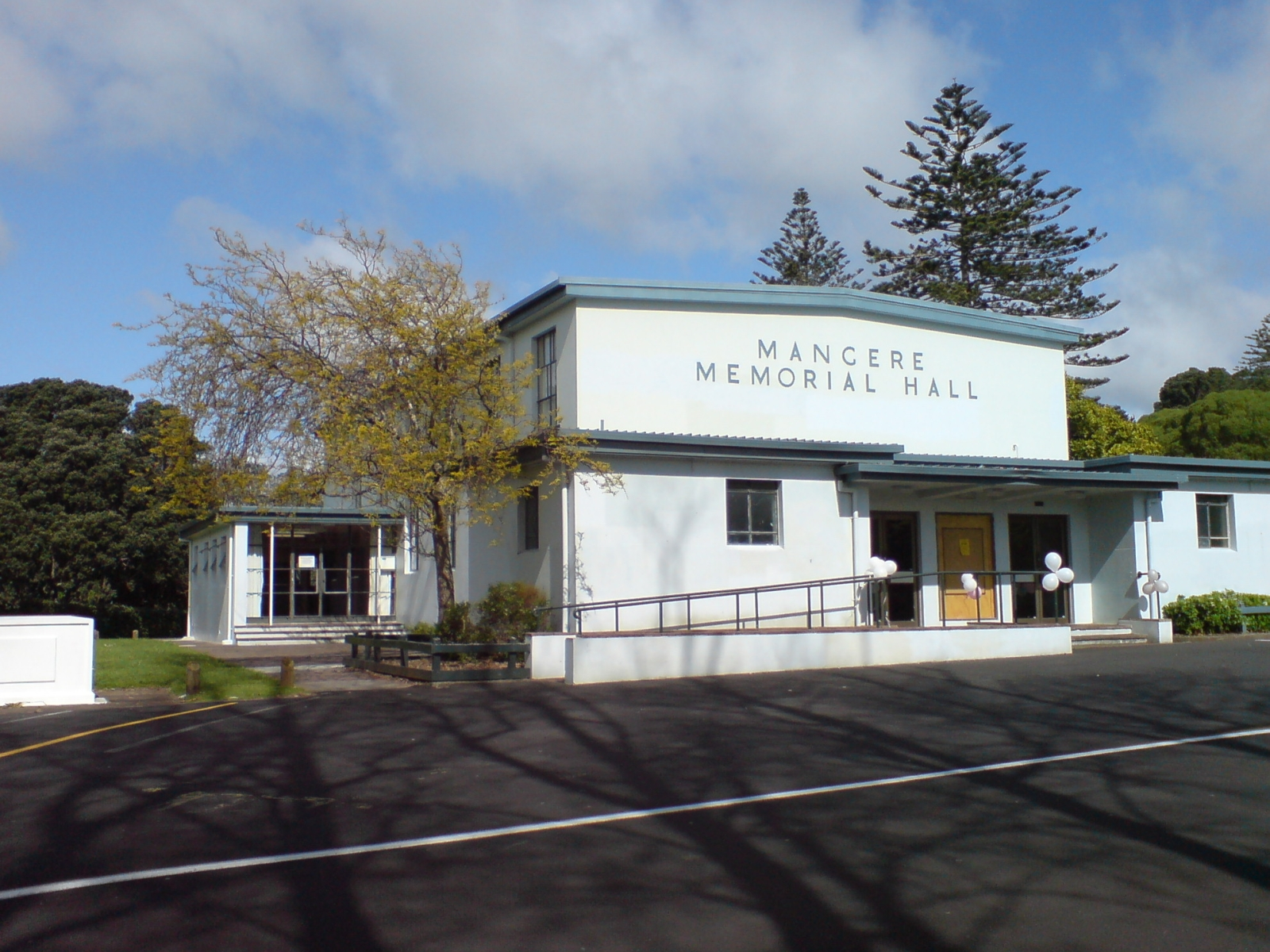
Māngere Memorial Hall

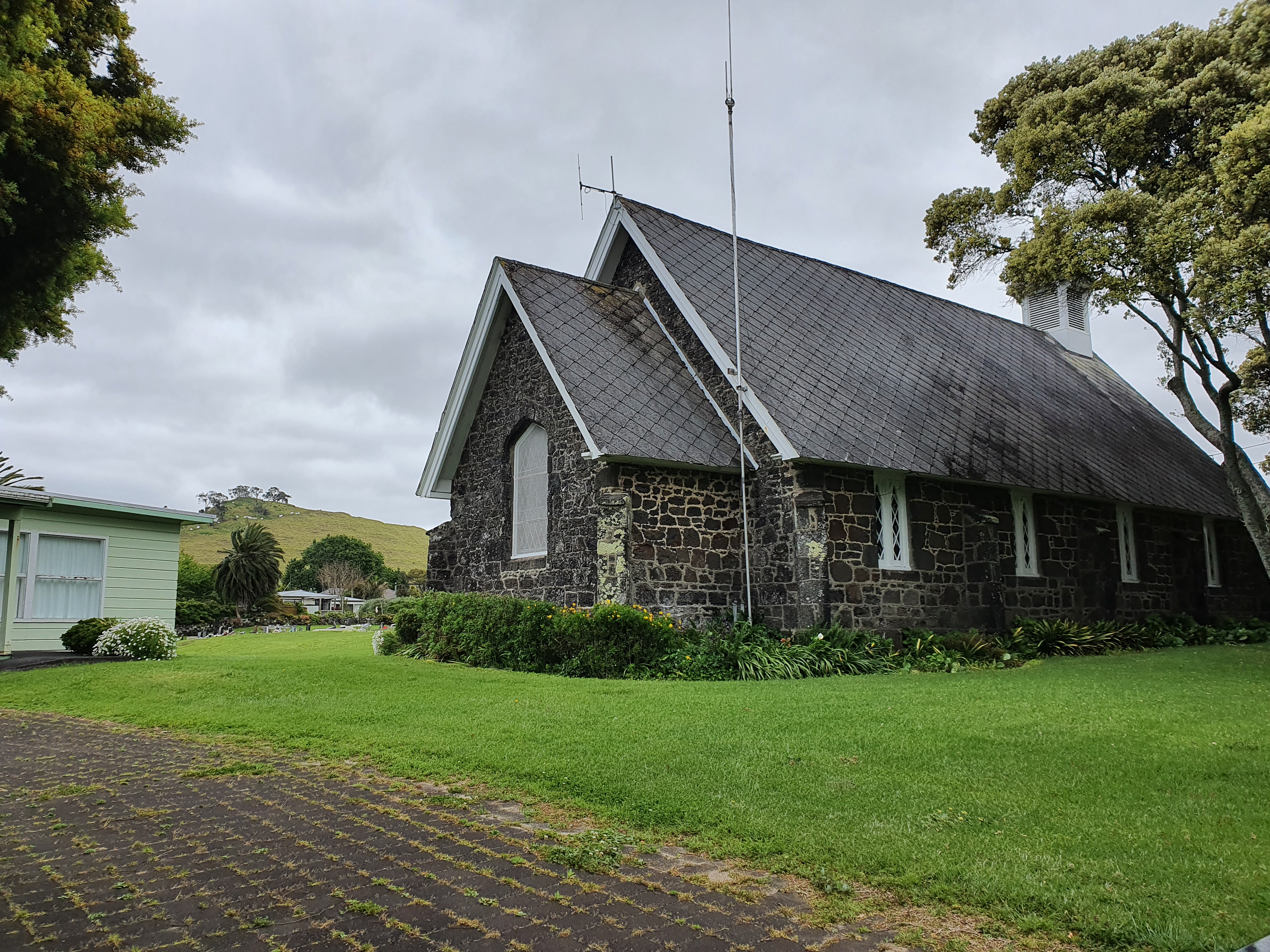
St James Anglican Church and Māngere Mountain

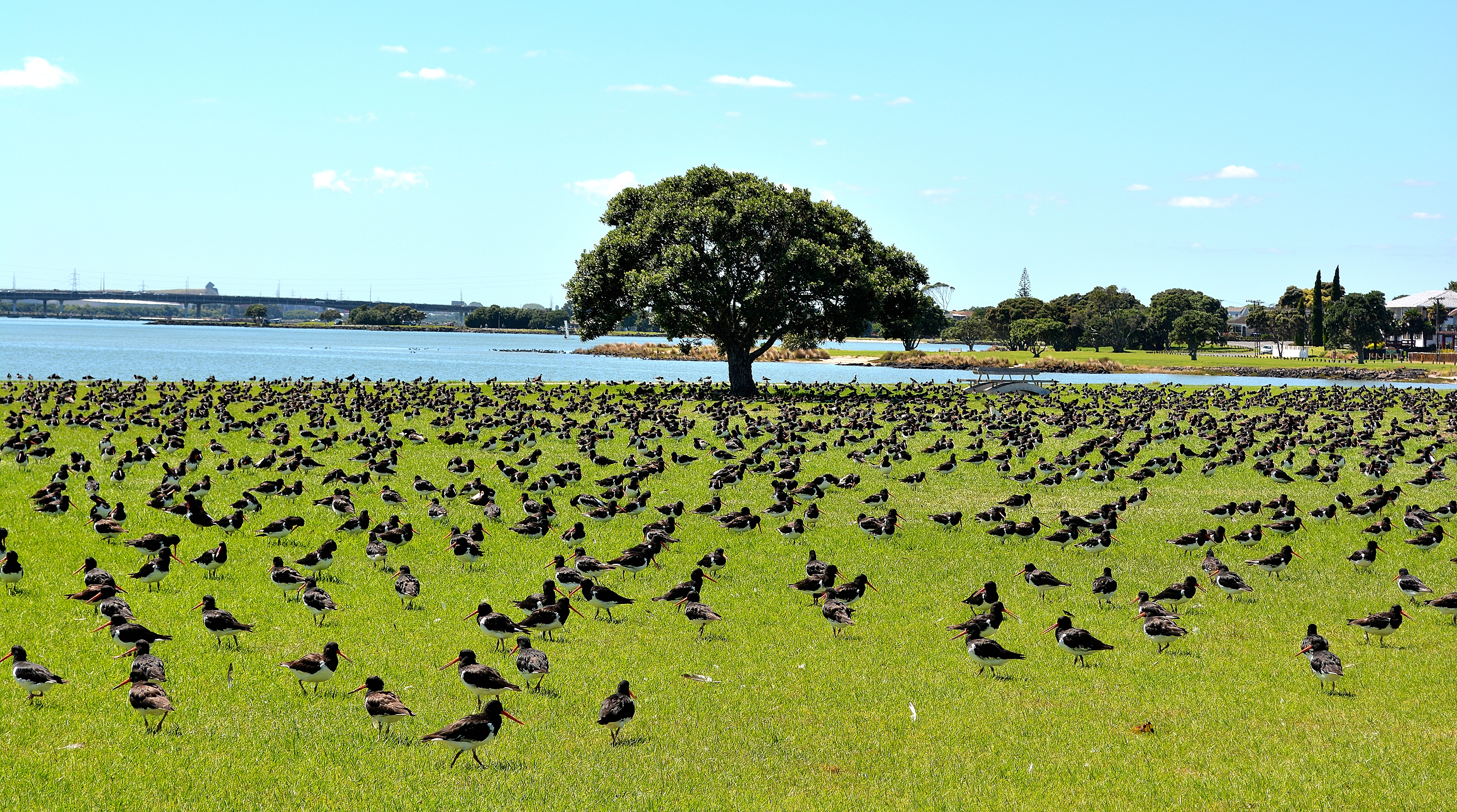
Variable oystercatchers along the Kiwi Esplanade Walkway

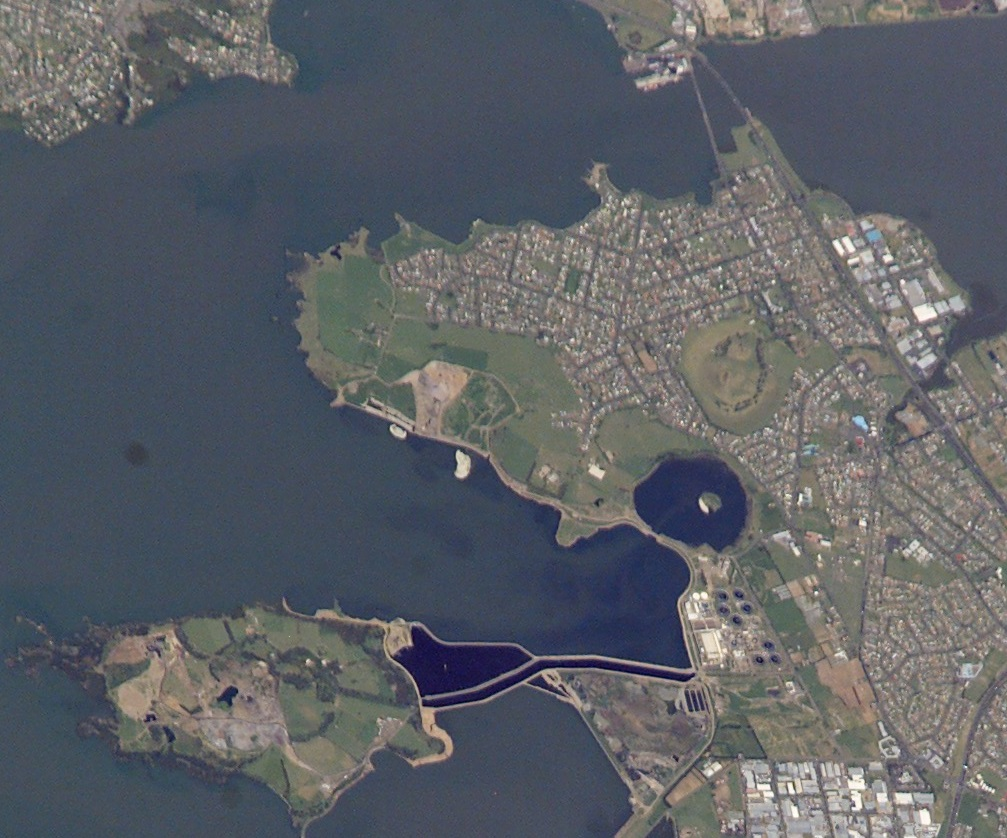
Satellite view of Māngere Bridge

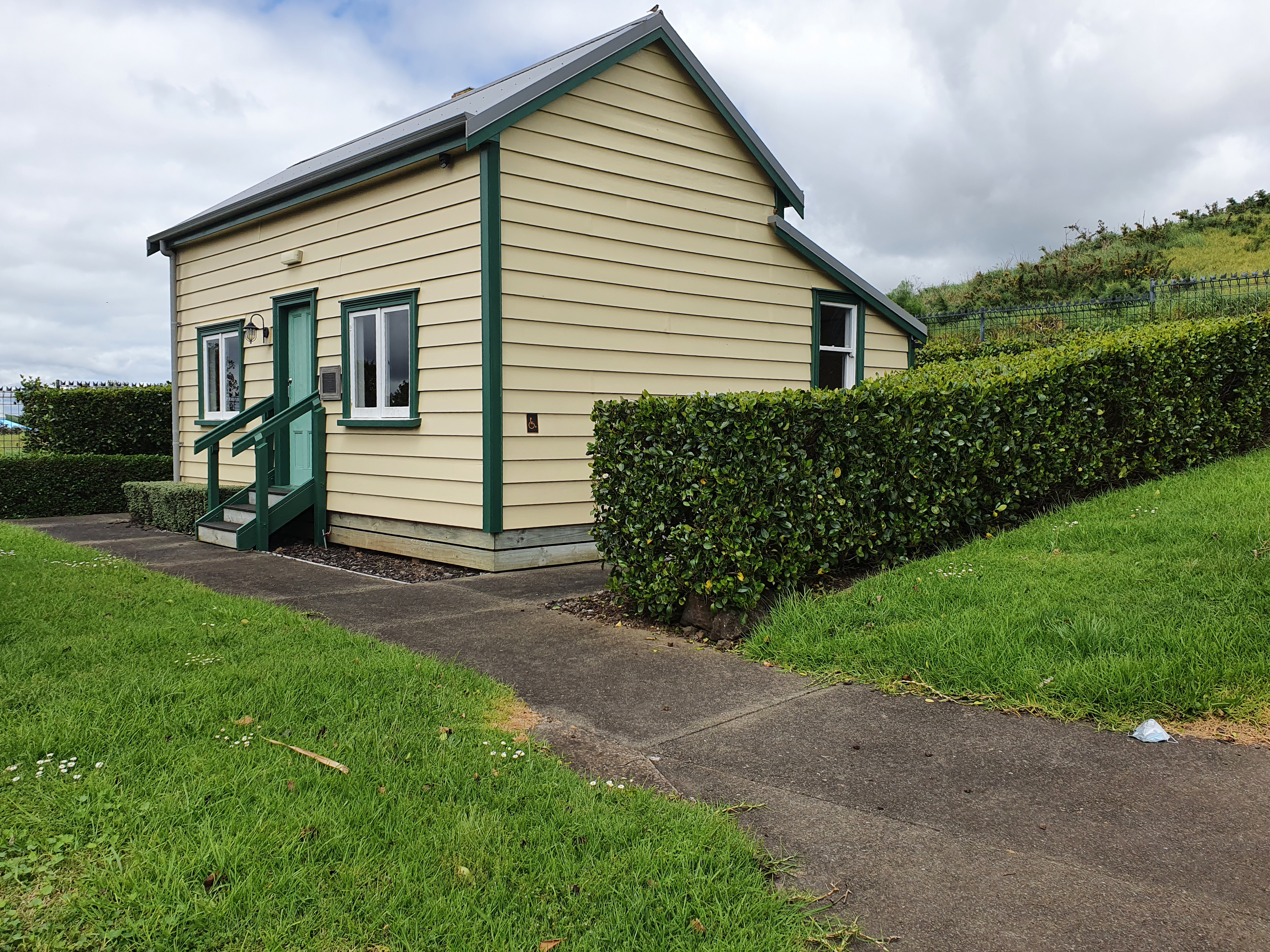
Restored cottage built for Tāwhiao, the second Māori King

== Politics ==
2020 General election party vote
Party	Māngere		Tāmaki Makaurau		New Zealand
Party	Suburb	Electorate	Suburb	Electorate	New Zealand
ACT	5.62%	1.55%	1.07%	1.08%	7.58%
Green	8.32%	3.99%	12.15%	10.65%	7.86%
Labour	56.91%	77.37%	63.11%	61.09%	50.01%
Māori	0.92%	0.90%	10.23%	12.93%	1.17%
National	20.38%	9.11%	3.20%	3.16%	25.58%
NZ First	3.67%	2.76%	5.76%	4.28%	2.60%

Māngere Bridge is a part of the Māngere-Ōtāhuhu local government area in Auckland, which elects seven board members to serve on the Māngere-Ōtāhuhu Local Board, The board is currently chaired by Lemauga Lydia Sosene, and all seven members are affiliated to the New Zealand Labour Party. The Māngere-Ōtāhuhu local government area is within the Auckland council's Manukau ward, and is currently represented on the Auckland Council by two councillors: Fa'anānā Alf Filipaina and Lotu Fuli.

Māngere Bridge is located within the Māngere general and Tāmaki Makaurau Māori parliamentary electorates. Since the 2008 New Zealand general election, the Māngere electorate has been represented by Aupito William Sio, while Peeni Henare has been the Member of Parliament for Tāmaki Makaurau since 2014. In the 2014 New Zealand general election, the voters of the suburb narrowly preferred the New Zealand National Party, despite the electorate overall voting strongly for the Labour Party. Māngere Bridge voters gave a relative majority to the Labour Party in 2017. Among Māngere Bridge polling stations in 2017 and 2020, support for the New Zealand National Party and Green Party of Aotearoa New Zealand was higher compared to the overall average for the Māngere electorate.

== Education ==
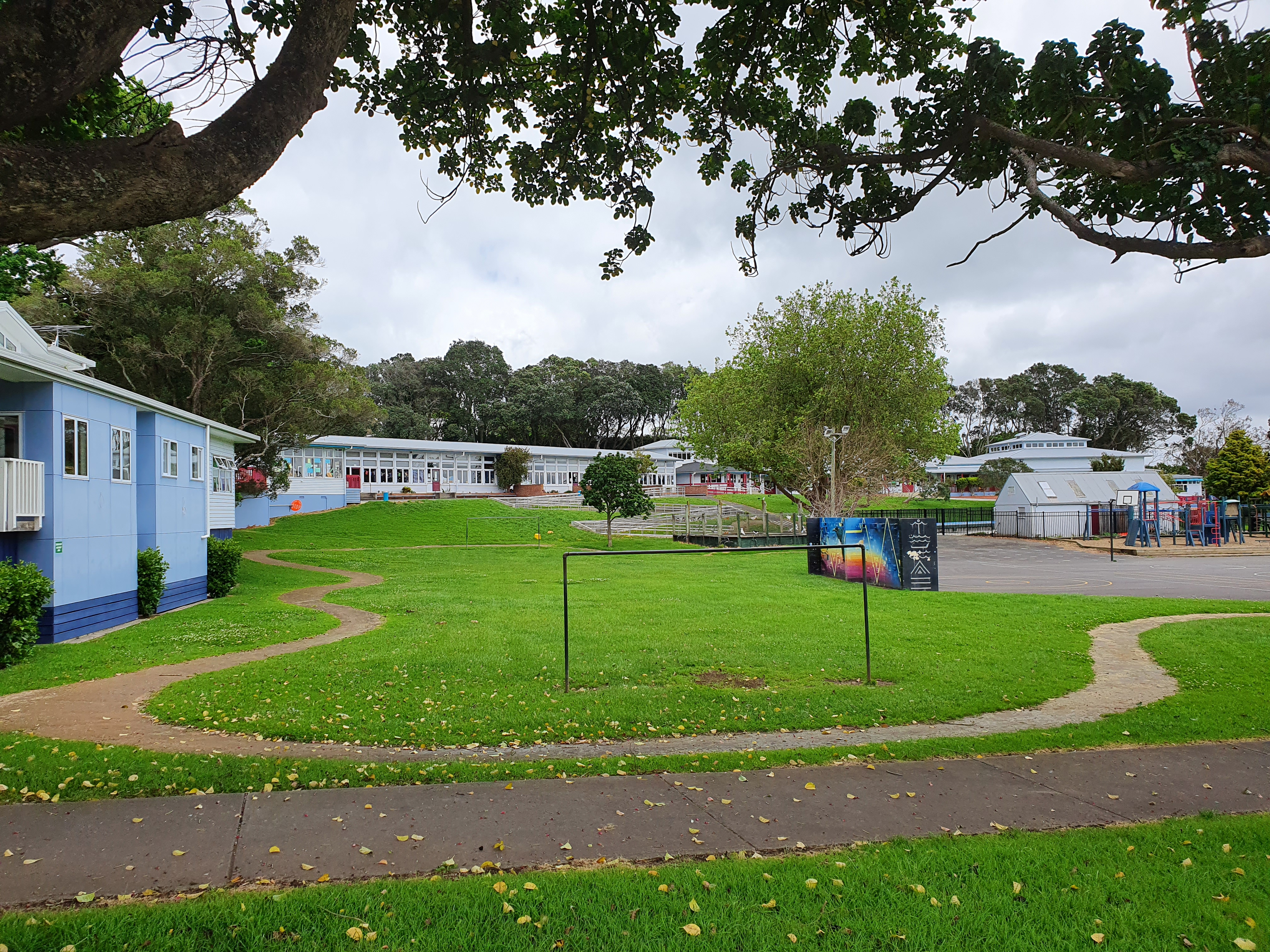
Māngere Bridge School, the first school established in the area in 1890

The Māngere Bridge area was originally served by the Māngere Central School, which opened in Māngere in 1859. The first school in the suburb was Māngere Bridge School, which opened in 1890. This was followed by Waterlea Public School (originally called Māngere Bridge No. 2 School) and Mountain View School (originally known as Miller Road Primary School) in 1955 and 1963, respectively. These three schools are contributing primary schools (years 1–6) with rolls of 328, 410 and 328 students, respectively.

Ambury Park Centre is a private secondary school (years 9–13) for students with disabilities. It has a roll of 3 students. Horse riding and care of horses are an important feature of their educational programme. Auckland Seventh-day Adventist High School is a state-integrated secondary school (years 9–13) with a roll of 333 students.

All these schools are coeducational. Rolls are as of July 2026.

== Transportation ==
Māngere Bridge is accessible by the Southwestern Motorway, which first served the suburb after the opening of the motorway bridge in 1983. The motorway was gradually extended northwest and southeast, and completed in July 2017.

In October 2016, a new bus network was implemented for South Auckland by Auckland Transport, involving three bus routes that served Māngere Bridge: the 309 between Māngere Town Centre and the Auckland CBD; the 313 service connecting Onehunga town centre to Manukau via Māngere and Papatoetoe; and the 380 connecting to Auckland Airport. In July 2021, the 36 and 38, frequent bus services to Manukau and Auckland Airport, replaced the 313 and 380. Māngere Bridge is a planned stop for the City Centre-to-Māngere light rail project.

== Amenities ==
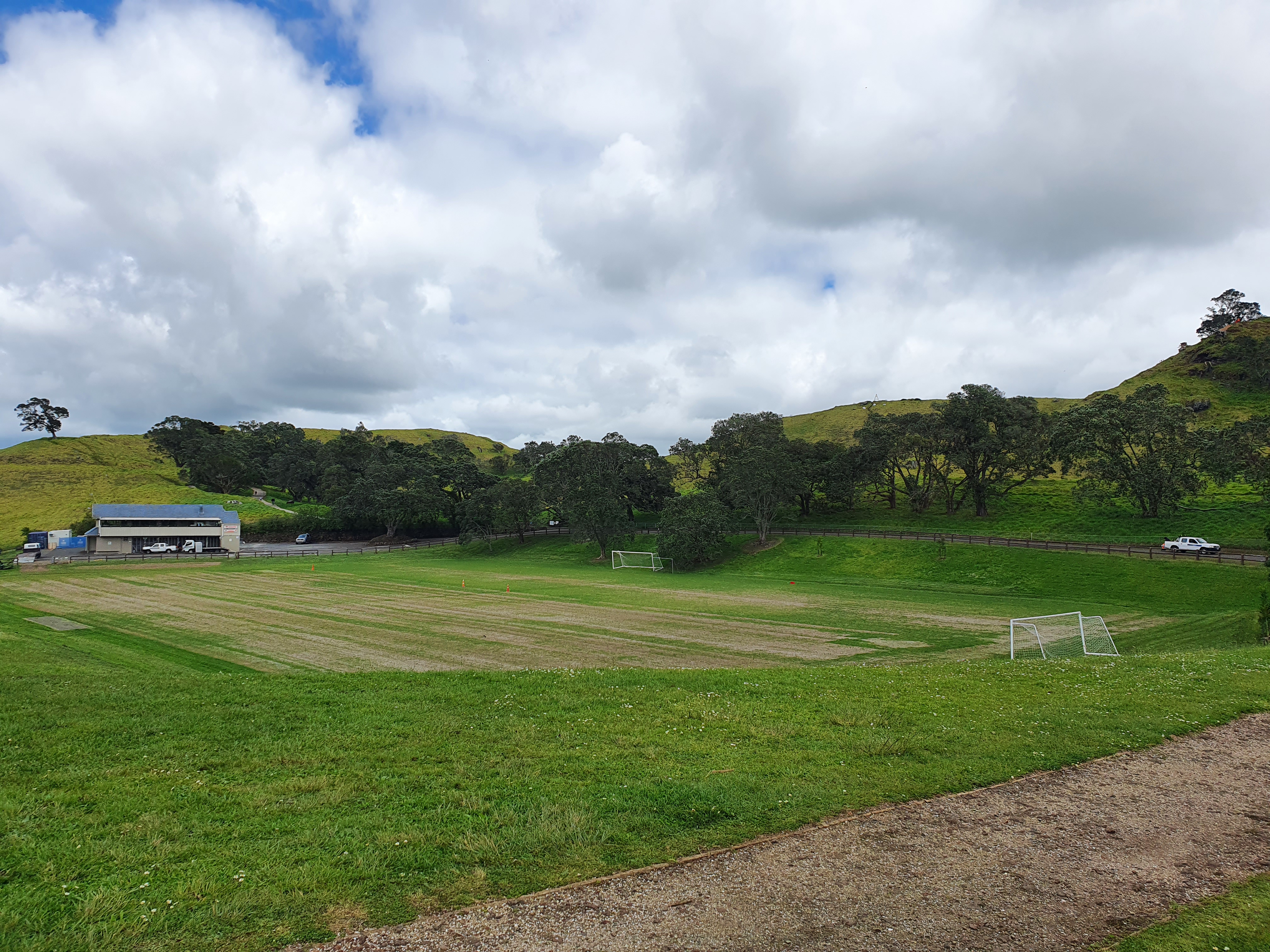
Onehunga Mangere United AFC grounds on Māngere Mountain

Māngere Bridge is home to Onehunga-Mangere United football club. Originally formed in Onehunga, the club moved its ground to Māngere Mountain in 1965. The disused Taylor Road quarry was redeveloped in 1965 as a sporting grounds, and became home to the Bridge Park Tennis Club, the Bridge Park Bowling Club in the 1990s, and the Māngere Bridge Scouts Hall. The scouting group, who have operated in Māngere Bridge since 1920, moved to the location after a fire in May 2007 destroyed the scouting hall at Ambury Regional Park. The Chinese Community Sports Centre was opened in October 1978.

== Notable people ==
- Alf Filipaina – former Māngere Bridge community constable, and Manukau ward councillor from 2010
- David Lange – former prime minister
- Willie Jackson – politician, broadcaster
- Mike King – comedian, mental health advocate
- Mahuta Tāwhiao – third Māori king
- Tumate Mahuta – Ngāti Mahuta (Tainui) tribal leader
- Tonga Mahuta – Ngāti Mahuta tribal leader
- Peter Murdoch – All Black and former member of the Mangere Rugby Football Club
- Waka Nathan – All Black and former member of the Mangere Rugby Football Club
- Tāmati Ngāpora – St James Anglican Church preacher, adviser to the Māori King
- Pōtatau Te Wherowhero – first Māori King
- William Sio – politician
- Tāwhiao – second Māori King
- Jon Zealando – magician, who won the Grand Master of Magic Award with his wife Janet in 1985

== Bibliography ==
- Ballara, Angela (2003). "Tāmaki-makau-rau (Auckland isthmus)". Taua: 'musket wars', 'land wars' or tikanga?: warfare in Maori society in the early nineteenth century. Auckland: Penguin. ISBN 9780143018896.
- Hayward, Bruce W. (2019). Volcanoes of Auckland: a Field Guide. Auckland University Press. ISBN 978-0-582-71784-8.
- Lancaster, Mike; La Roche, John (2011). "Mangere Bridge". In La Roche, John (ed.). Evolving Auckland: The City's Engineering Heritage. Wily Publications. ISBN 9781927167038.
- Payne, Val (2005). Celebrating Mangere Bridge. Mangere Historical Society. ISBN 0-476-00941-3.
- Stone, R. C. J. (2001). From Tamaki-makau-rau to Auckland. Auckland University Press. ISBN 1869402596.
