= Mutu Kapa =

Mutu Paratene Kapa MBE (1870 – 10 November 1968) was a New Zealand tribal leader, orator, sportsman, and Anglican priest. Of Māori descent, he identified with the Te Aupōuri and Waikato iwi. He was born in Ohinepu, Waikato, New Zealand, in 1870.

In the 1964 Queen's Birthday Honours, Kapa was appointed a Member of the Order of the British Empire, for services to the Māori people.

== Biography ==
Kapa was born at Ōhinepū, Te Kōpua, in the Waikato to parents Waimārama Pene Ruruanga of Waikato and Ngāti Maniapoto and Paratene Kātene Kapa of Te Aupōuri, a farmer. His grandfather Hēmi Rēweti Te Kapa had been one of the first Māori missionaries in the Tai Tokerau area. Eparaima Te Mutu Kapa was his uncle. Kapa was very athletic in his youth and played numerous sports, including rowing, rugby, football, hockey, tennis and wood-chopping. He excelled in rowing and rugby, making it as an All Black trialist in 1905.

The history of the Anglican church in the area as well as encouragement from his family led to him to pursue the ministry. He was educated at Te Rau Theological College, Gisborne, and was ordained a deacon in 1907 and became a priest in 1911.

Kapa died in November 1968. His tangihanga was held at Te Puea Memorial Marae, and he was buried at the St James Anglican Church in Māngere Bridge, Auckland.
