= St James Anglican Church, Māngere Bridge =

Anglican church in Māngere Bridge, New Zealand

Coordinates: 36.9418°S 174.7833°E

St James Anglican Church
- St James Anglican Church, Māngere Bridge
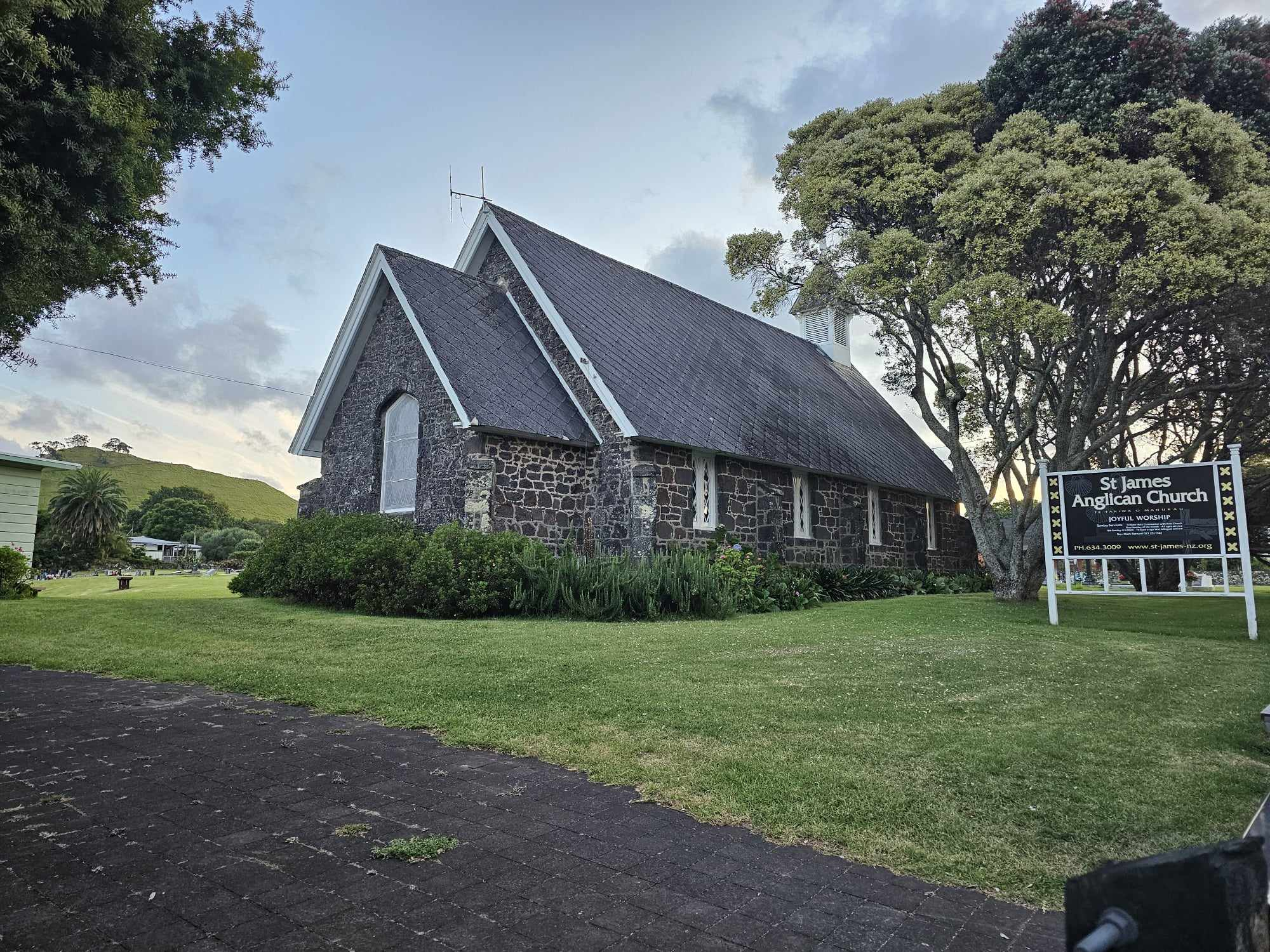
- St James Anglican Church, 2024
- St James Anglican Church
- Location: Māngere Bridge, Auckland
- Denomination: Anglican
- Website: https://www.st-james-nz.org/

Architecture
- Functional status: Active
- Architect: Arthur Purchas
- Architectural type: Church
- Style: Selwyn stone Church

Clergy
- Priest: Rev. Mark Barnard

Heritage New Zealand – Category 2
- Designated: 4 April 1983
- Reference no.: 689

St James Anglican Church is a category II heritage listed Anglican church in Māngere Bridge, Auckland, New Zealand. Built in the 1850s it is the only remaining stone Selwyn church in Auckland.

== History ==
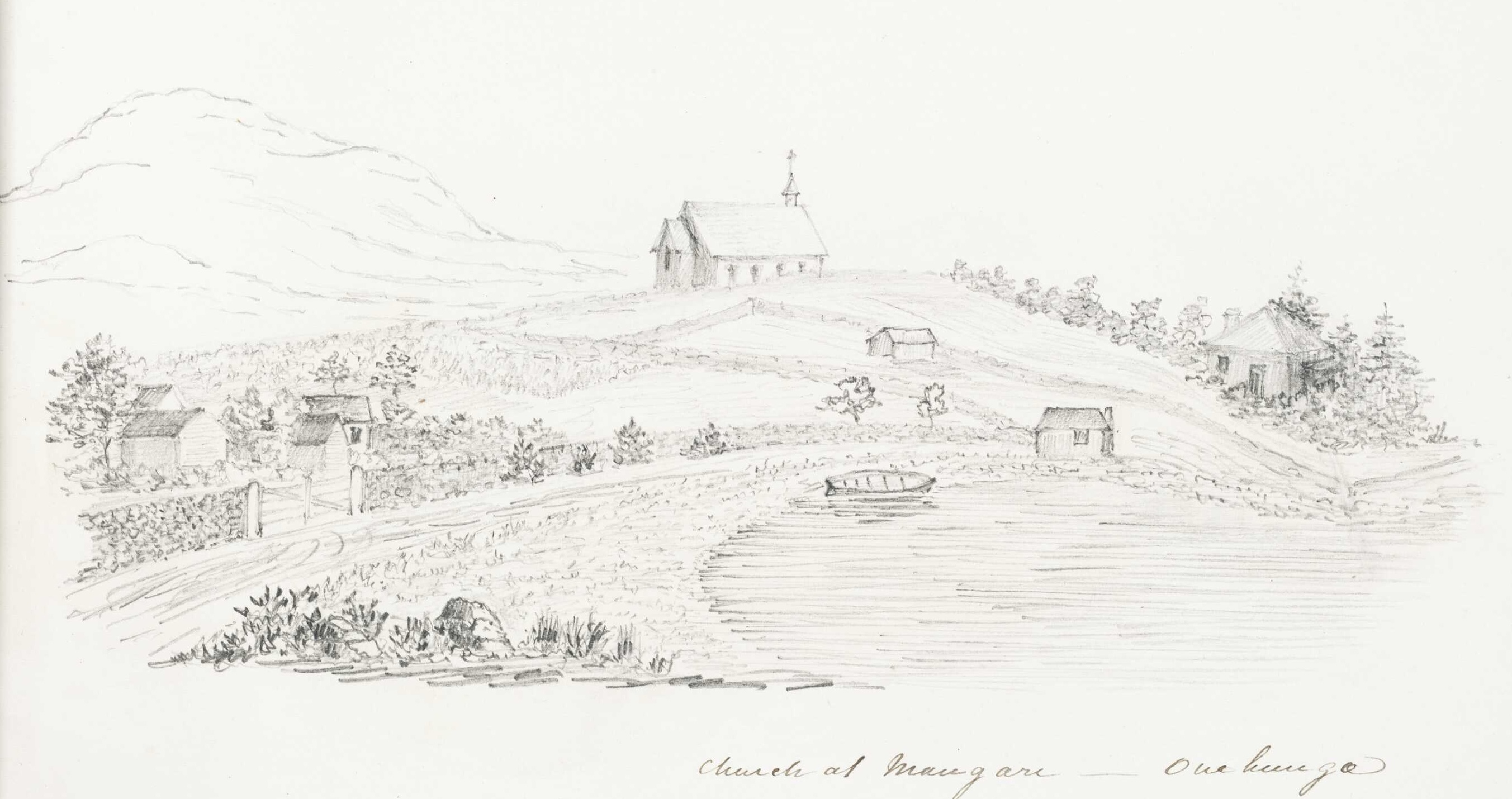
Drawing of St James' Church by Henry Thomas Spratt between 1860 and 1870

St James Anglican Church and the surrounding cemetery are located in Māngere Bridge on land formerly occupied by Tāmaki Māori (Waiohua and later Ngāti Whātua). In 1837 Ngāti Mahuta were gifted land by Ngāti Whātua, later establishing a defensive settlement for Auckland.

In 1849, the land where the church now sits was granted by Governor George Grey, for the purpose of settlement of Maori from the Waikato, and the development of a church. It is recorded that the building project was managed by Rev Arthur Purchas, who served as architect, and Tāmati Ngāpora. This venture was recorded to be co-funded by Bishop Selwyn and local Māori. The church was built and funded by the resettled Māori bar a £10 donation from Bishop Selwyn. Reverend Robert Burrows oversaw the construction.

The church was constructed of scoria from the nearby Mangere Mountain, it was completed c.1857.

Over the years, many efforts to preserve the church and churchyard have been made. The church was renovated in 1917 and the roof fixed in 1928 and again 1974. This included in 1924, a group of female members of the church forming a guild to promote events and raise funds to maintain the church. Later in 1938, further pleas to preserve the historic site were made. This resulted in an extensive renovation of the memorials to Māori chiefs Ēpiha Pūtini and Kati Takiwaru, who had great significance to the area.

During the invasion of the Waikato the land grant was rescinded but was restored after the war and the church became governed by a board of trustees made up exclusively of Māori. c.1965 the trust became governed by both Māori and non-Māori, following a change in rules.

The original floor was replaced in 1988; however, the original windows remain today. On 4 April 1983 St James Church was registered by the New Zealand Historic Places Trust (now Heritage New Zealand) as a Category II historic place with registration number 689.

== Description ==
St James Church is built of scoria quarried from Te Pane o Mataaho / Māngere Mountain. Designed by Bishop Selwyn, St James Church is the only surviving stone church from the Selwyn period in Auckland. It is noted that Bishop Selwyn made several attempts at stone churches in Auckland, most of them left to decay or were completely abandoned.

Due to the difficulty of stone construction, the chancel arch and arches of the doors are made from brick, not stone.

The church has a rectangular nave 40 ft (12 m) by 24 ft (7.3 m), a chancel at the east and a vestibule at the west. Some of the walls are up to 18 in (460 mm) thick. There are buttresses every 12 ft (3.7 m) which support the roof.

== Gallery ==
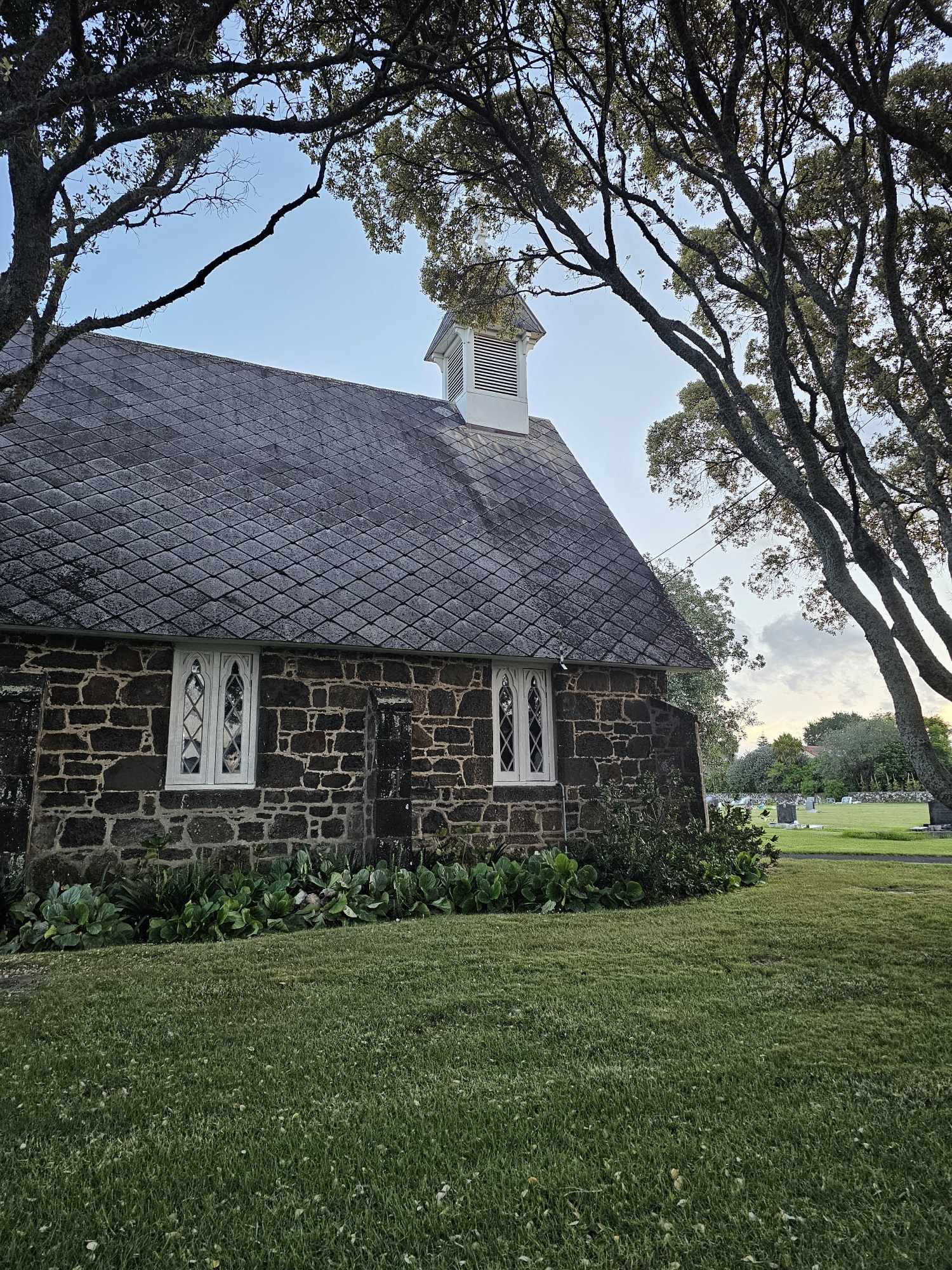
Side view St James Anglican Church Mangere Bridge, 2024

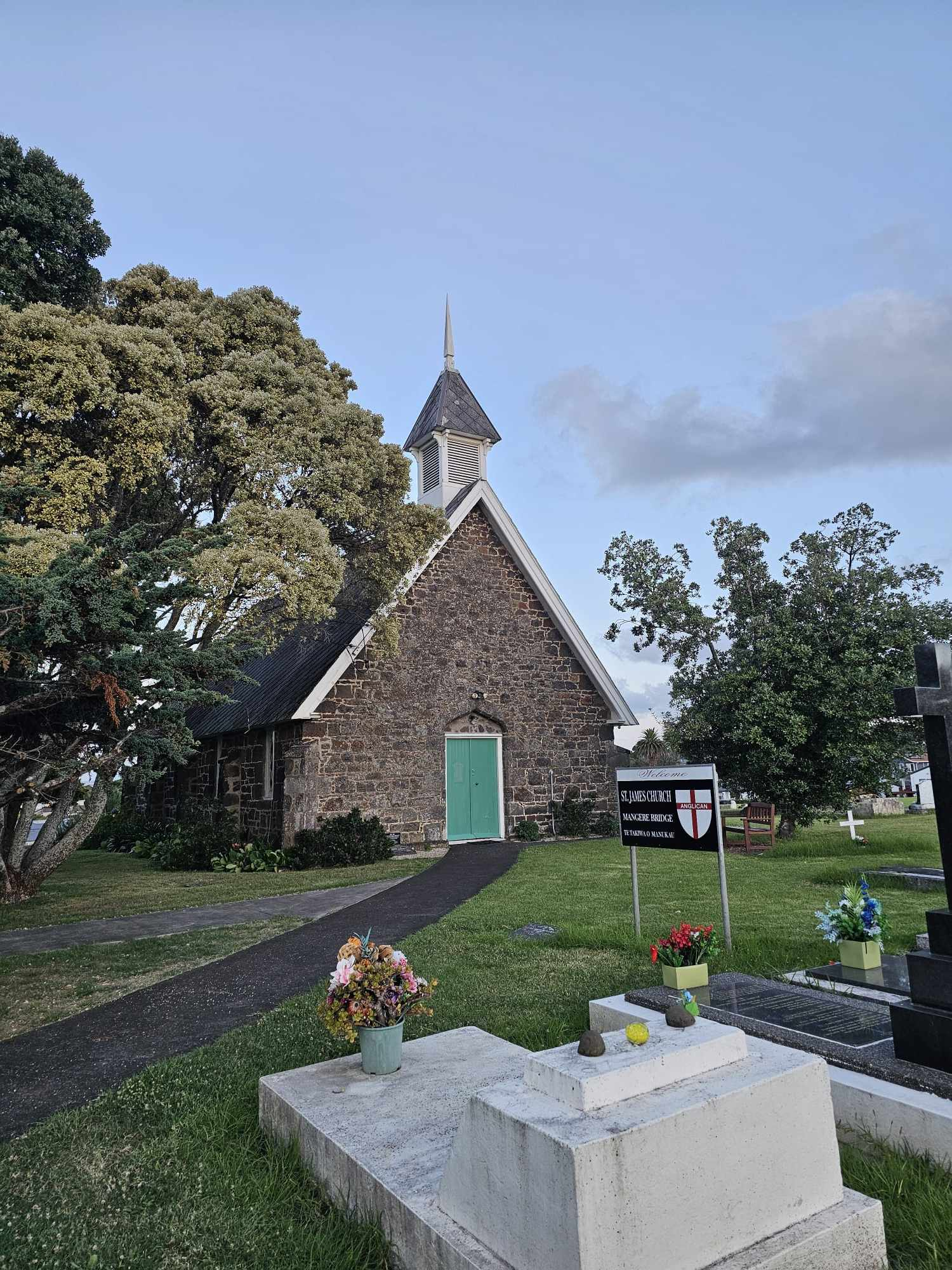
View of St James Church Mangere Bridge from cemetery, 2024

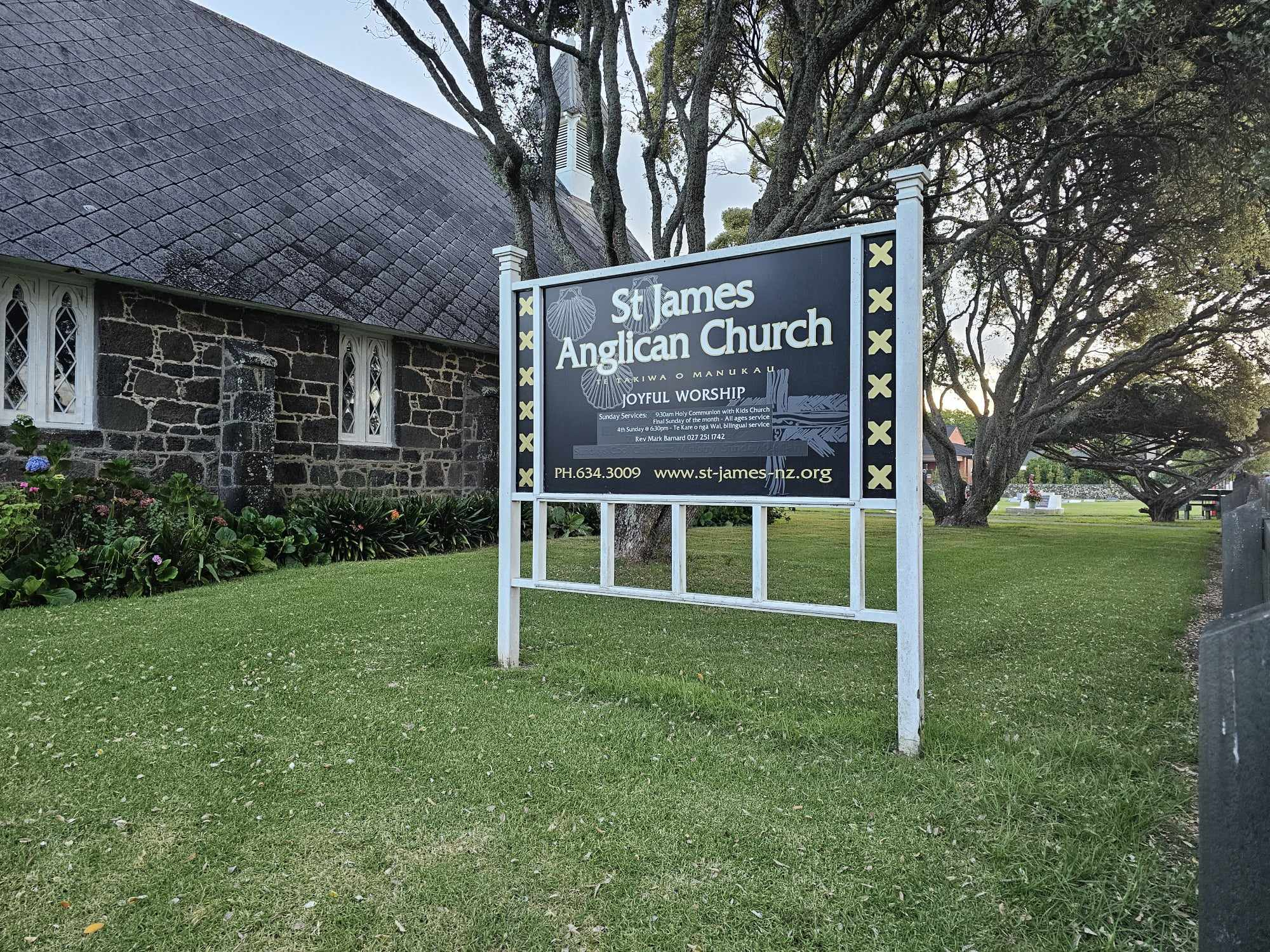
Sign at St James Anglican Church Mangere Bridge, 2024

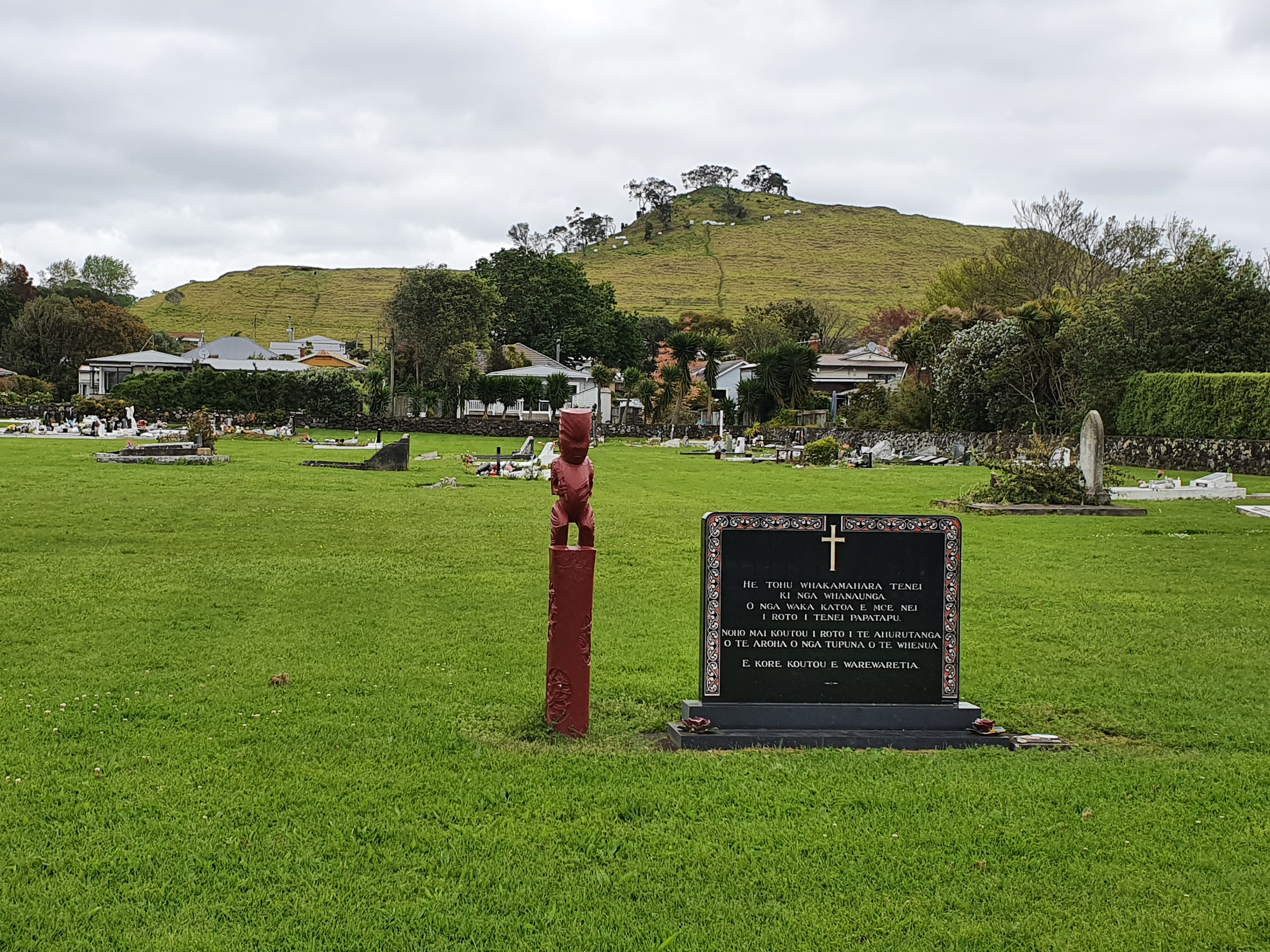
View of the urupā with Māngere Mountain in the background, 2021
