= Te Puea Memorial Marae =

Marae in Māngere Bridge, Auckland

- Marae
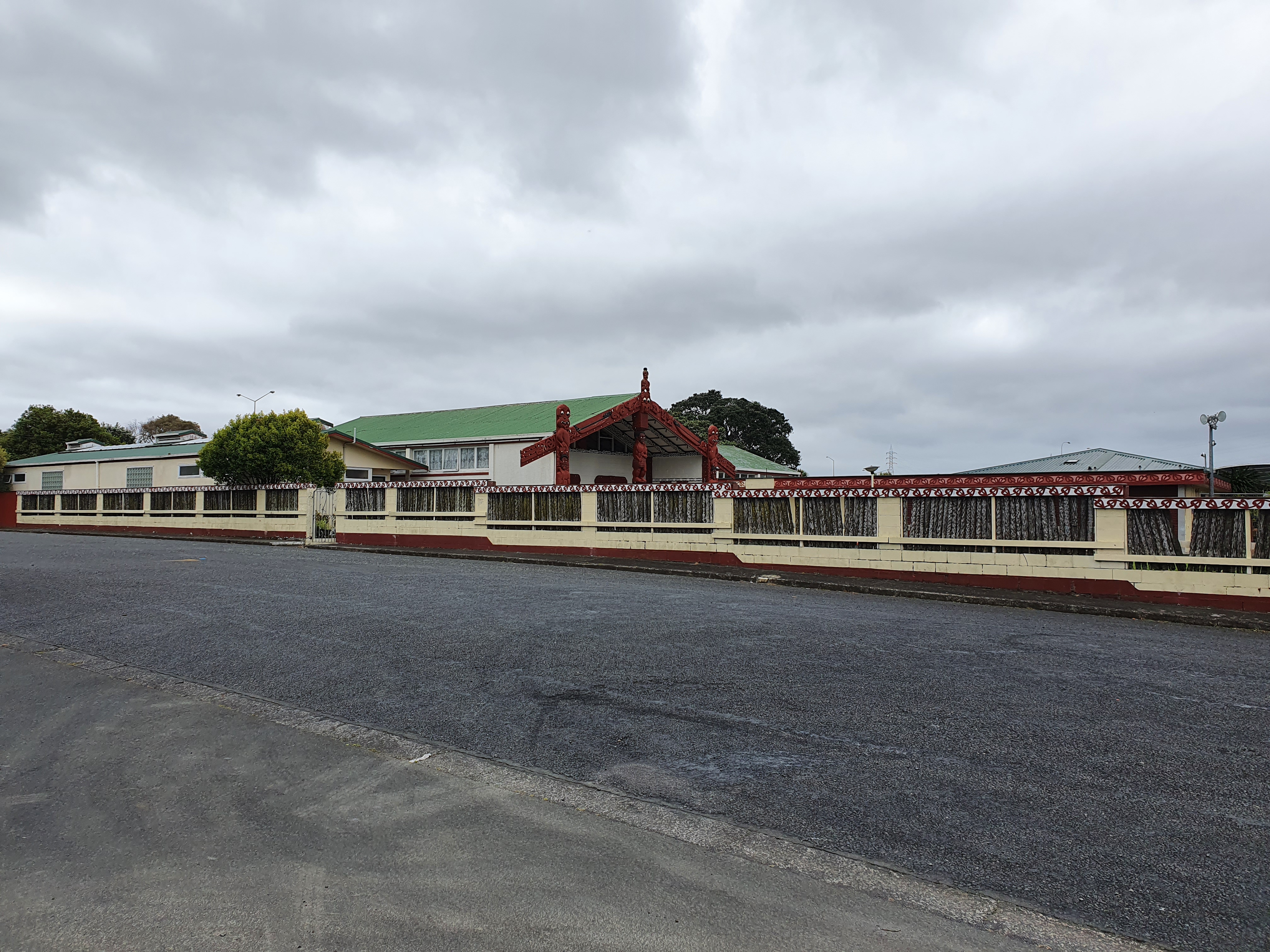
- Whare tupuna of Te Puea Memorial Marae
- Interactive map of Te Puea Memorial Marae
- Etymology: Te Puea Hērangi
- Coordinates: 36.94183°S 174.79217°E
- Location: Māngere Bridge, Auckland, New Zealand
- Iwi: Waikato
- Hapū: Ngaati Mahuta
- Opened: 1965
- Wharenui: Te Puea
- Wharekai: Ngaa Tamawahine
- Website: www.tepueamemorialmarae.co.nz

Te Puea Memorial Marae is a marae located in Māngere Bridge, Auckland, New Zealand. Opened in 1965, it was the first urban marae in Auckland, built for all Māori instead of a specific iwi, but in particular as a community centre for local urban Māori communities around Onehunga and Māngere, and for the Waikato Tainui iwi. The marae is named for Māori leader and relative of King Mahuta, Te Puea Hērangi, and is known by the proverb te kei o te waka o Tainui (the stern of Tainui), as it is the northernmost marae associated with Waikato Tainui.

The marae has been used as an events centre, and since 2016 the marae has provided transitional housing and emergency provisions for homeless people.

== History ==
=== Land history ===
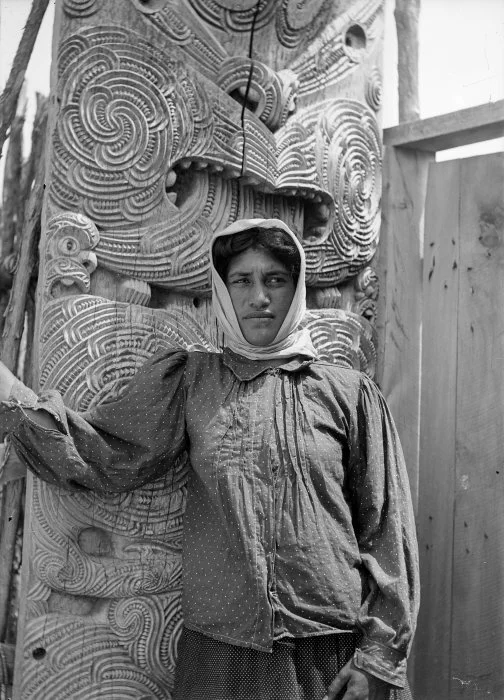
Te Puea Hērangi was a major proponent of the development of urban marae

The land where the marae stands was part of the rohe of the Waiohua confederacy of Tāmaki Māori until the 1740s, subsequently settled by Ngāti Whātua until 1840. In the 1820s and early 1830s, the threat of Ngāpuhi raiders from the north during the Musket Wars caused most of the Tāmaki Makaurau area to become deserted. During this period, a peace accord between Ngāpuhi and Waikato Tainui was reached through the marriage of Matire Toha, daughter of Ngāpuhi chief Rewa, to Kati Takiwaru, the younger brother of Tainui chief Pōtatau Te Wherowhero (later the first Māori King), and they settled together near Māngere Mountain. In the late 1840s, Governor George Grey asked Pōtatau Te Wherowhero to settle with his people in the Māngere Bridge area to defend the township of Auckland. Pōtatau Te Wherowhero and members of Ngāti Mahuta (a hapū of Waikato Tainui) settled near to the land where his brother Kati Takiwaru lived, an area of 480 acres around the base of Māngere Mountain.

Most of the inhabitants left in the 1860s prior to the Invasion of the Waikato, when Governor Grey required that all Māori living in the South Auckland area needed to swear loyalty to the Queen, due to the government's fears of the Māori King Movement. On 16 May 1865, the Ngāti Mahuta village at Māngere Bridge was seized by the Crown under the New Zealand Settlements Act 1863.

In 1890, some of the land at Māngere Bridge was returned to three individuals from Ngāti Mahuta: King Tāwhiao, Ihipera Kati Barlow, a descendant of Kati Takiwaru and Matire Toha, and Tiahuia, mother to Te Puea Hērangi. Barlow was given the title to the land at Lot 5A, the future site of Te Puea Memorial Marae. By the early 20th Century, this land had become farmland for the Rewha family. In addition to the farmland, Lot 5A included a sandy beach and a natural source of spring water, where people would wash clothes.

In 1933, a petition to the government was made to set aside one acre of land for a wharenui and marae, however plans did not eventuate due to the effects of the Great Depression. By the 1940s, the local community began to prefer building a marae at Onehunga to the north.

In 1947, the land where the marae was to be built was gifted to the community by Parehuingauru Barlow, wife of Hoka Rewha who had farmed the land. Barlow gifted the land to all Māori, and not Tainui specifically. In December 1947, the reserve was vested in a 16-member trust, whose members included Te Puea Hērangi. Hērangi was a major proponent for re-establishing marae across the country, and before passing in 1958, expressed a wish for a marae to be built at the site.

=== Opening and surrounding land development ===
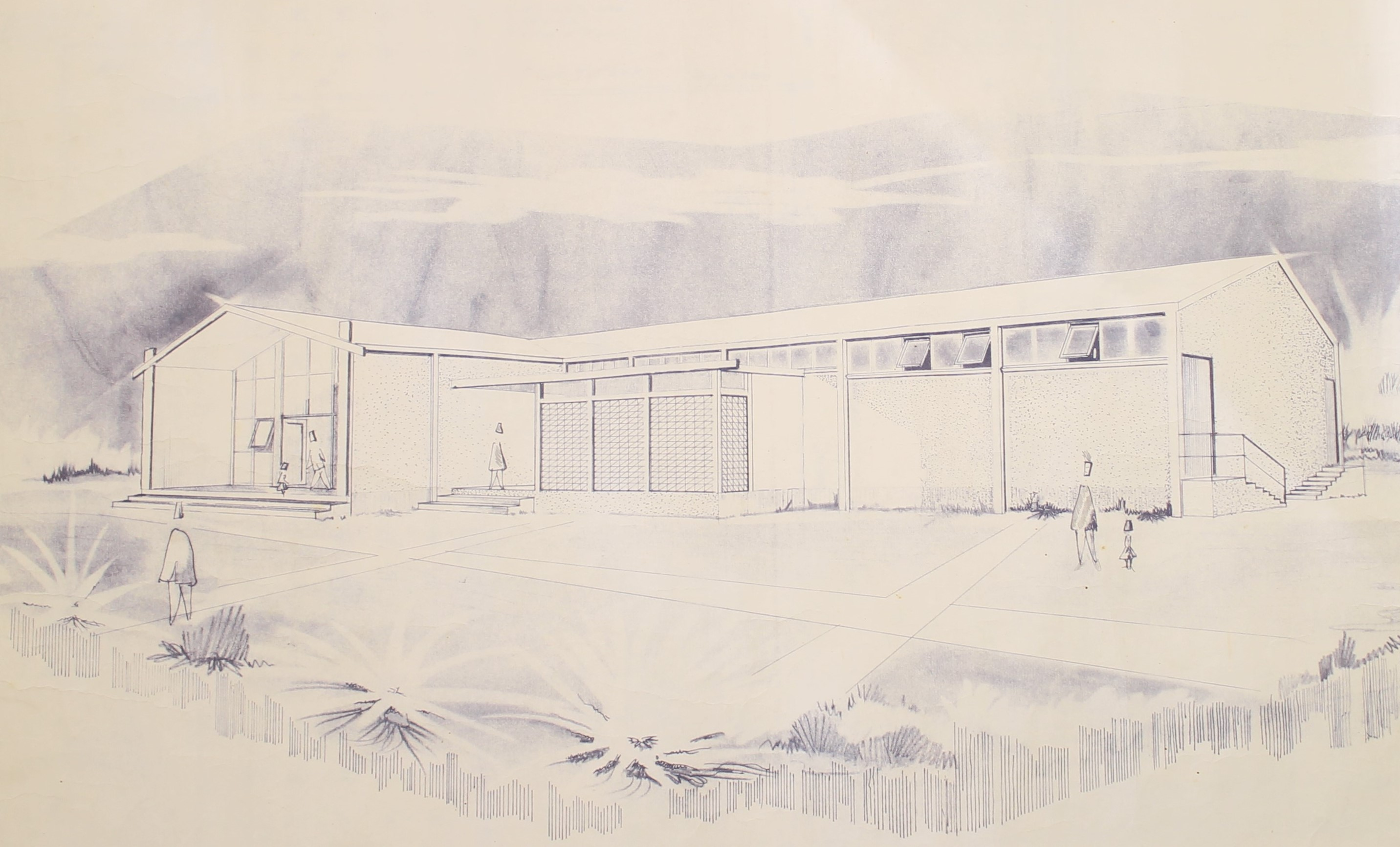
Concept drawing from the building plans of Te Puea Memorial Marae

In 1963, the Māngere and Onehunga communities were greatly affected by the Brynderwyn bus accident, as a large number of people in the accident were from the area. In the aftermath, the Onehunga community struggled to accommodate the tangihanga they needed to host for the community members. Prime Minister Keith Holyoake and opposition leader Walter Nash, who both attended the tangi in Onehunga, noticed the lack of space and resources that the community was facing, and agreed for the government to co-finance a marae after witnessing the difficulties. Fundraising came from a range of places, including community fundraising from the Māori community hall in Onehunga, and profits from felling macrocarpa trees on the property and quarrying scoria from Māngere Mountain.

The marae was officially opened by Governor-General Bernard Fergusson in November 1965. The marae was named after Te Puea Hērangi, to acknowledge her contributions to the people of Aotearoa. At the time of opening it was the first urban marae constructed in Auckland. The marae has strong links to Waikato Tainui and the Kīngitanga movement, and is described with the proverb te kei o te waka o Tainui (the stern of Tainui), as it is the northernmost Waikato Tainui marae. The marae whakairo (carving), completed in July 1965, was carved in a Waikato Tainui style.

In the 1970s and early 1980s, construction began on the Southwestern Motorway in Māngere Bridge, directly adjacent to the marae. While previously on the edge of the Māngere Inlet, land reclamations projects isolated the marae from the Manukau Harbour, destroying the sandy beach that previously bordered the marae. During the construction of the motorway, land adjacent to the marae was rezoned from residential to light industrial, and factories began to surround the marae. The motorway cut easy pedestrian access between the marae and the Māngere Bridge village community, disconnecting the marae from the local community. This had a strong effect on older members of the community, who were no longer able to walk between the marae and the cemetery at St James Anglican Church to the west. Complaints about how close the motorway was and the factories which surrounded the marae were made to government bodies, however few actions were taken to resolve these issues.

In November 1990, the Manukau City Council gifted 2.5 hectares of land adjacent to the marae.

=== Community centre and events ===
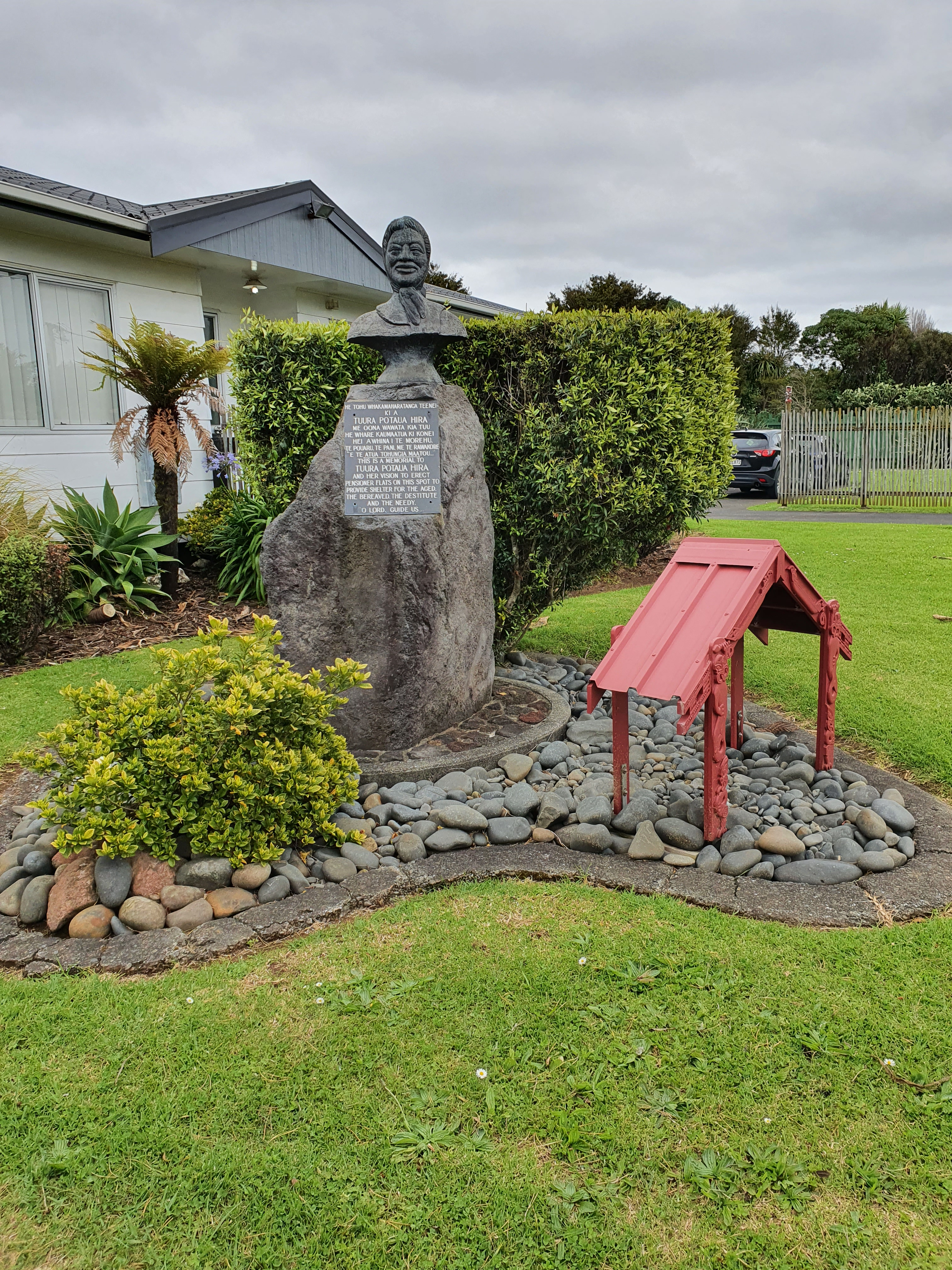
Bust of Tuura Potaua Hira, major proponent of the development of pensioner flats at Te Puea Memorial Marae

After opening, the marae began to be used for community events such as pōwhiri, tangihanga, unveilings and weddings. One of the largest early uses of the marae was the tangi for Te Aupōuri and Waikato leader Mutu Kapa, which was held in November 1968.

In the 1970s, the marae became a venue used by members of the Māori protest movement, including Ngā Tamatoa and groups protesting the 1981 Springbok tour. The plan to undertake the 1975 Māori land march was initiated by Dame Whina Cooper at a hui held at Te Puea Memorial Marae. Eva Rickard spoke at the marae during the hīkoi to Waitangi, and kuia Nanny Tuura based at Te Puea during the 1985 Bastion Point marches.

In 1978, the Tainui Trust Board sought planning permission to erect social housing units adjacent to the marae, to provide housing for elder members of the community. These units were opened in the mid-1980s. The marae was the location of the first national meeting of Māori nurses in 1984.

In the 1990s, the marae was used as a broadcasting location for Radio Tainui. In 2005, the Raukura Hauora o Tainui charitable trust opened a medical centre on the marae.

=== Centre for homelessness ===
In May 2016, an emergency meeting was called by the board, addressing the growing problem of homelessness. The board agreed to provide temporary housing and resources for homeless people in Auckland, establishing the Manaaki Tāngata programme, and by the end of the week 60 people had moved to the marae. The marae provided emergency housing using a kaupapa Māori model, initially housing people in temporary offices. The first year of the Manaaki Tāngata programme ended in September 2016, after 181 people were helped by the marae. Because of the emergency housing initiative, Hurimoana Dennis, chairman of Te Puea Memorial Marae, was nominated at the New Zealander of the Year Awards. In the 2022 Queen's Birthday and Platinum Jubilee Honours, Dennis was appointed a Member of the New Zealand Order of Merit, for services to Māori and the community.

In July 2017, the Manaaki Tāngata was revived for the next six months, and in the same year opened Piki te Ora, a multipurpose facility to combat homelessness. In 2017, the marae developed Manaaki Tāngata e Rua, a larger programme focusing on providing emergency housing for the area.

In the first three months of the COVID-19 pandemic in New Zealand, 480 families had been helped by the marae.

As a part of the Tāmaki Herenga Waka Stories of Auckland (2021) exhibit at the Auckland War Memorial Museum, a temporary housing room at Te Puea Memorial Marae was recreated, including a basket of necessities provided to new arrivals to the marae.
