= Oruarangi Creek =

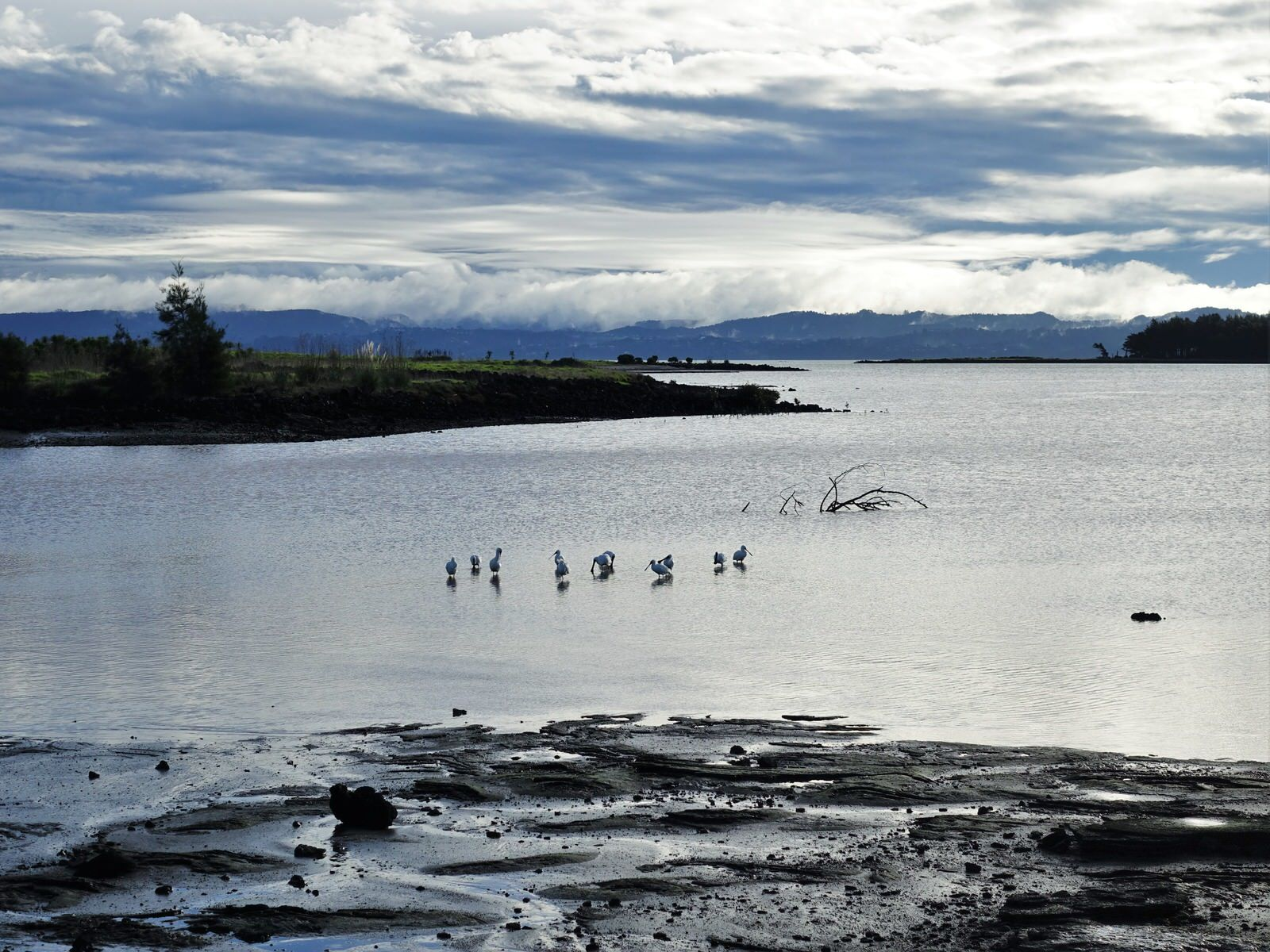
- Royal spoonbills (kōtuku ngutupapa) at the mouth of the Oruarangi Creek

- Mouth of Oruarangi Creek Oruarangi Creek (New Zealand)
- Route of Oruarangi Creek

Location
- Country: New Zealand
- Region: Auckland Region

Physical characteristics
- Source: Māngere
  - coordinates: 36.97916°S 174.7755°E
- Mouth: Manukau Harbour
  - coordinates: 36.97795°S 174.76199°E

Basin features
- Progression: Oruarangi Creek → Manukau Harbour
- Tributaries
  - left: Kaipatiki Creek
- Bridges: Oruarangi Bridge

The Oruarangi Creek is a stream in Māngere, in the Auckland Region of New Zealand's North Island. It flows from Māngere into the Manukau Harbour.

== Etymology ==
The name of the creek refers to Ruarangi, who was a chief of the patupaiarehe, supernatural beings who lived in the area before the arrival of people.

== Description ==
The creek begins in Māngere. It follows a spiralling pattern through suburban, industrial and rural Māngere. It is met by a tributary river, the Waitomokia Creek, and flows north-west into the Manukau Harbour. The creek's catchment covers an area of 536 hectares (1,320 acres), including Airport Oaks industrial estate, Villa Maria Vineyard, farmland and Makaurau Marae. The two kilometres of creek close to the river mouth are tidal and brackish.

== River health ==
The creek has elevated levels of zinc, copper, total petroleum hydrocarbon and other contaminants.

== History ==
In 1960, the Manukau Sewage Purification Works (now Māngere Wastewater Treatment Plant) was opened, The ponds caused degradation to the environment of the harbour, including traditional fishing grounds in the Oruarangi Creek, strong odours and swarms of Chironomus zealandicus (New Zealand midge) in the surrounding areas. Between 1998 and 2005, Watercare Services removed the oxidation ponds, allowing the creek to flow directly into the harbour again. Since this time, a number of regeneration projects have been undertaken along the shores of the creek.

== See also ==
- List of rivers of New Zealand
