= Tāmati Ngāpora =

New Zealand Waikato Māori leader

Tāmati Ngāpora (died 5 August 1885) was a New Zealand Waikato leader, lay preacher, assessor and adviser to the Māori King.

Ngāpora was born in the early 19th century to parents Hore and Kahurimu, and belonged to Ngāti Mahuta. His father Hore was a brother of Te Rauangaanga, the chief of Ngāti Mahuta, and so Ngāpora was a cousin of Pōtatau Te Wherowhero, the first Māori King. Ngāpora and his family became Christians, and he took the name Tāmati (Thomas). He married his cousin Hera.

Although not initially in favour of an intertribal Māori kingship, Ngāpora acted as the King movement's representative to the Governor of New Zealand after Te Wherowhero became king in 1858. Te Wherowhero proposed that Ngāpora should succeed him, but others favoured Te Wherowhero's son Tāwhiao, who duly succeeded him. When the Government invaded the Waikato in 1863, Ngāpora took refuge in the King Country with Tāwhiao. Ngāpora changed his name to Manuhiri (meaning guest) to signify his exile. Ngāpora became Tāwhiao's closest adviser. His daughter Hera married Tāwhiao and was his principal wife and mother of the third Māori King, Mahuta. Ngāpora remained living at Whatiwhatihoe, the royal village in the King Country, and died there on 5 August 1885. He was believed to be about 80 years old.
