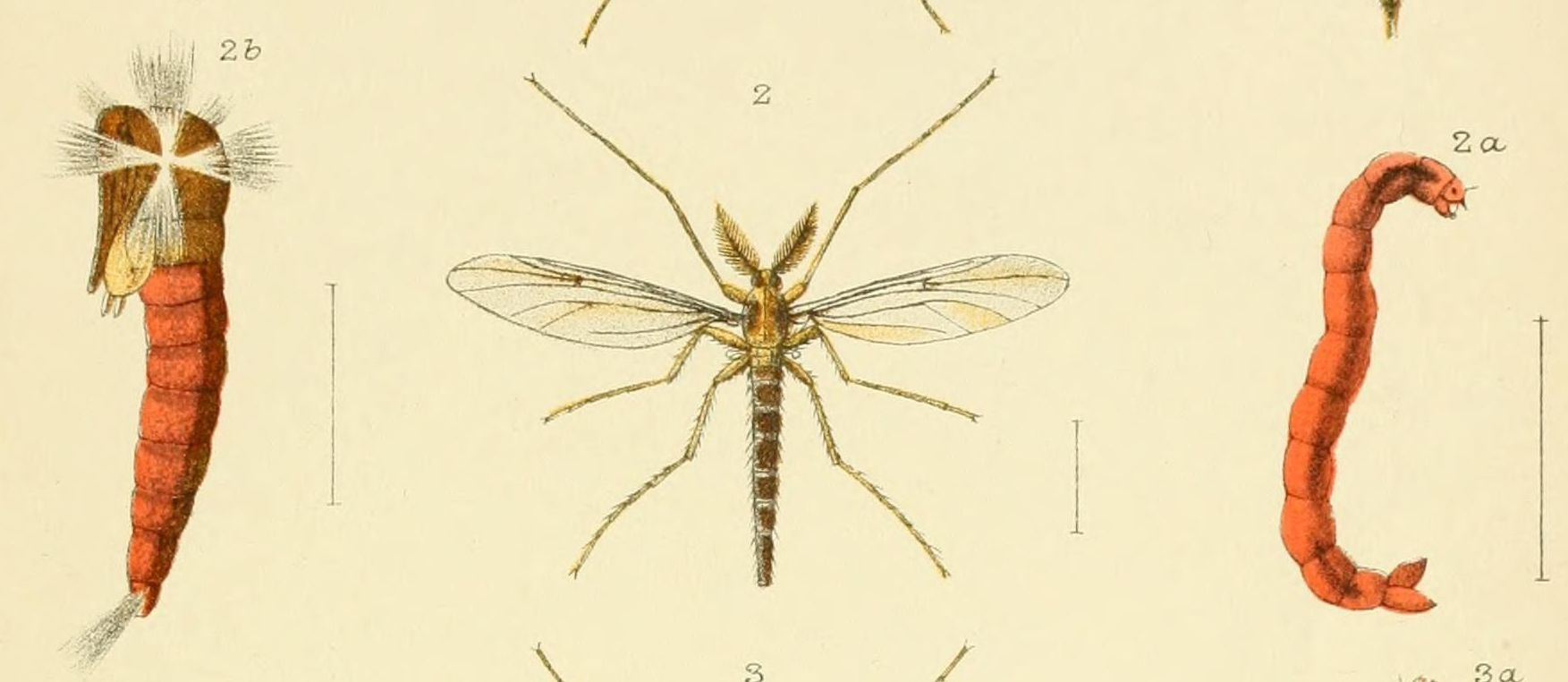
- Pupa (left), adult (center), larva (right)

Scientific classification
- Kingdom: Animalia
- Phylum: Arthropoda
- Class: Insecta
- Order: Diptera
- Family: Chironomidae
- Genus: Chironomus
- Species: C. zealandicus

Binomial name
- Chironomus zealandicus Hudson, 1892

= Chironomus zealandicus =

Species of midge

Chironomus zealandicus, commonly known as the New Zealand midge, common midge, or non-biting midge, is an insect of the Chironomidae family that is endemic to New Zealand. The worm-like larvae are known to fisherman and have a common name of blood worm due to their red color and elongated blood gills.

== Description ==
Chironomus zealandicus is a member of the Diptera order (flies with a single pair of wings) and the Chironomidae family (non-biting midges). Species in the genus Chironomus are often confused with mosquitoes, as they look very similar, but taxonomically they are more closely related to New Zealand sandflies than to mosquitoes.

The males of this species have feathery antenna, and the females do not. The feathered antennas allow the insect to be able to walk in the water. The colouration of the species is black or dark segmented parts on the body (abdomen) with green or yellow striping. Chironomus has three types of teeth in its mandible, one single strong apical tooth, three inner subapical teeth, and a single outer apicodorsal tooth. The mentum of Chironomus also has 15 darker pigmented teeth on outer sides and either sides of the teeth. The adult is approximately 5mm in length. The larvae form is blood red and has elongated blood gills on its penultimate abdominal segments.

== Distribution and habitat ==
Chironomus zealandicus is endemic to New Zealand. It was first reported by Hudson in 1892 and was later described taxonomically by Frederick Hutton in 1902 and Kieffer in 1921 with the name Chironomus novae zealandiae. In New Zealand, this species is mostly found in freshwater and lake areas in North Island and South Island, such as in Lake Ngaroto in Hamilton, Lake Rotoroa, Lake Ellesmere / Te Waihora in Canterbury, and other South Island lakes and freshwater areas.

C. zealandicus can be found in swarms in lakes, rivers, and swamps, where they typically breed in slow stagnant water. They are especially found in great numbers in areas which are man-made. The species often lives in areas that suffer from pollution; although, as a result of its make up it can withstand these conditions unlike other midge species such as a green midge larvae related to it. The myoglobin contained in the species (made up of an iron and oxygen-binding protein) helps them survive in habitats they are abundant in such as stagnant, low oxygen water. In New Zealand, the species is common in the lower reaches of the West Coast glaciers, geothermal waters and seashores.

== Life cycle ==
The New Zealand midge has 4 stages in its life cycle. This ranges from egg, larva, pupa and adult. The midge often breeds in swarms in areas of lakes and stagnant water which suits pupae and larvae to breed. Eggs are often laid in numbers up to 3000 and are contained in a gelatinous substance which helps it to attach to objects in the water such as sticks or to river or lake banks. The eggs which are not attached to any material sink to the bottom but this does not stop the eggs ability to hatch on the lake bed. The first stage (the egg) lasts between 2 and 7 days in which it hatches and then feeds on the gelatinous material for a couple of days. It then burrows into the substrate or the material available for it to make its home. Most of the larval stage is spent in a tube constructed from silt. During this stage, they take on a red colour which is where the name blood worm arises from. They spend 2–7 weeks in this form which can be faster or slower due to current water temperatures caused by season weather. After they reach the end of this cycle they pupate. The pupae creates burrows in the sediment layer, where as a pupa its lives in constructed tubes. The pupa stage lasts for up to 3 days where they emerge to the surface by actively swimming and stay on the surface for several hours until the adult form emerges. The adult stage lasts a maximum of 5 days in which they breed in swarms at night and then die. In the right conditions with regards to water temperature and season, the full life cycle can be completed within two weeks.

== Diet and foraging ==
The adult stage does not eat and this contributes to its short life; it is known as a non-biter unlike some related species. During undulations which are created by using 2-elongated blood gills filters oxygen and nutrients past them in the water layer. In New Zealand there are a wide range of strategies the midge uses as the fauna are so diverse. With this diversity in food selection it is able to get sources of nutrients from algae, microorganisms, invertebrates, macrophytes, and woody debris.

== Predators, parasites, and diseases ==
The midge from the larva, pupa and adult form is predated on by river fish and other aquatic vertebrates such as indigenous minnows. Examples of this are small trout which will come up and feed on the swarms above and on the surface of the water on warm nights. Other invertebrates such as arthropods are known to prey on midges, this is usually through chance due to swarms landing or getting caught in webs. Chironomus suffer deforming in the head capsules. A study by Jeyasingham and Ling has shown that the incidence of deformity increased during summer in larvae, the cause to this incidence is season, genetic factors and sediment chemistry which may have caused problems to the deformity of the Chironomus capsule heads.
