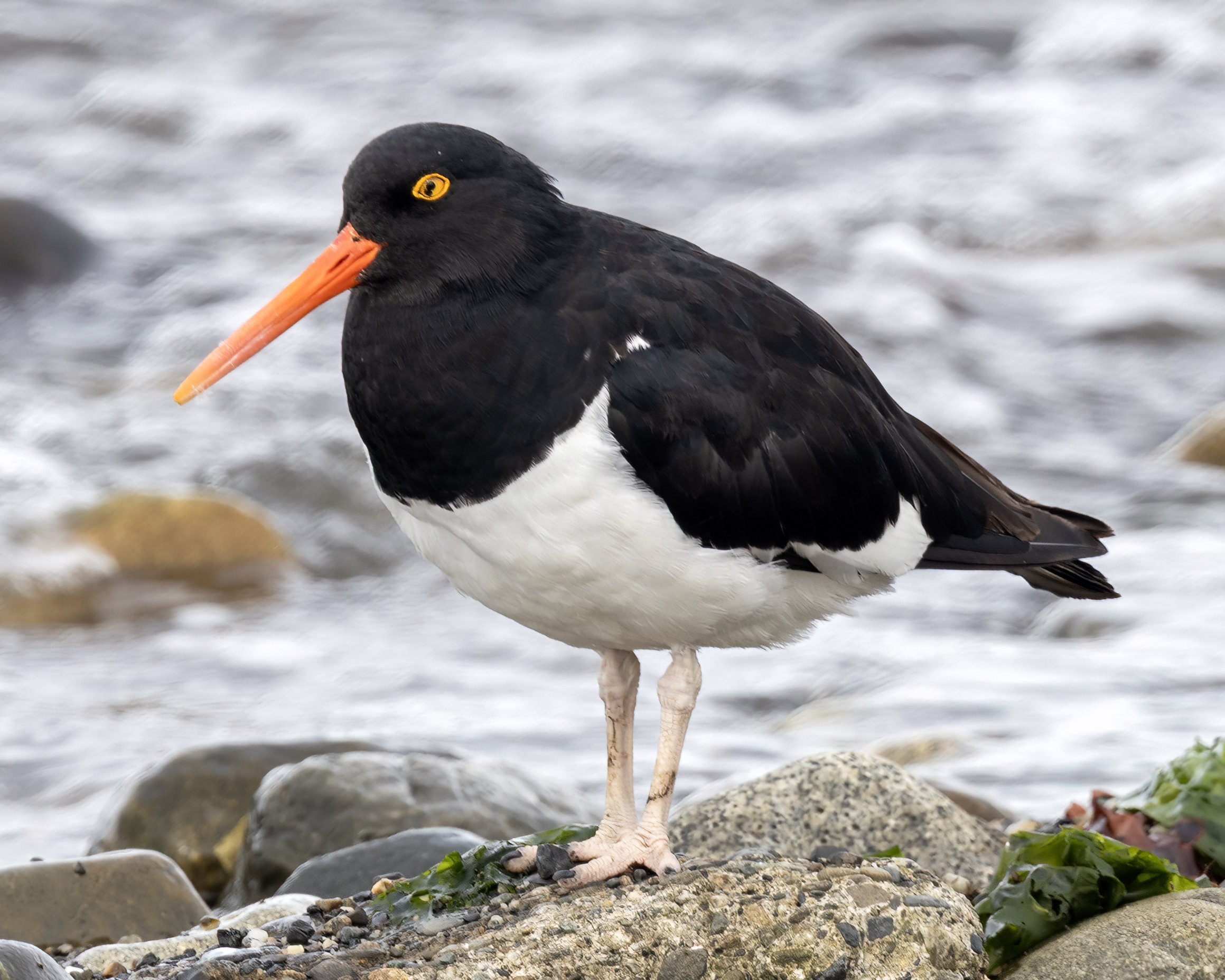

Conservation status
- Least Concern (IUCN 3.1)

Scientific classification
- Kingdom: Animalia
- Phylum: Chordata
- Class: Aves
- Order: Charadriiformes
- Family: Haematopodidae
- Genus: Haematopus
- Species: H. leucopodus

Binomial name
- Haematopus leucopodus Garnot, 1826
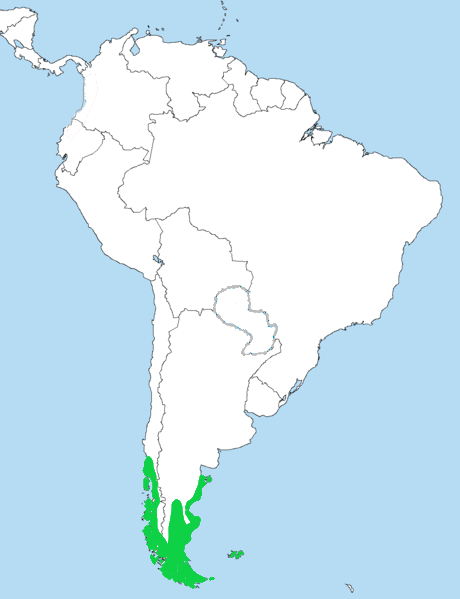

= Magellanic oystercatcher =

Species of bird

The Magellanic oystercatcher (Haematopus leucopodus) is a species of wader in the family Haematopodidae. It is found in Argentina, Chile and the Falkland Islands in freshwater lake and sandy shore habitats.

== Description ==
The Magellanic oystercatcher has a length between 42 and 46 cm (17 and 18 in). The male weighs around 600 g (21 oz) and the female is a little heavier. This bird has a long, orange beak, yellow eye and eye ring, and yellow legs. The head, breast, back, wings and tail are black and the underparts are white, as are the feathers on the inner part of the wing which can be seen in flight. It is very similar in appearance to the American oystercatcher (Haematopus palliatus), but can be distinguished by the yellow ring of bare skin that surrounds its yellow eye and the white secondary feathers. No other species of oystercatcher has these two features, and it is also the only New World species to have a black rather than a brown back. The call is similar to other oystercatchers, a repeated high-pitched "pee-pee".

== Distribution and habitat ==
This species is native to the southern tip of South America. Its range includes southern Argentina, Tierra del Fuego and other nearby islands, and the Falkland Islands. It is present on South Georgia and the South Sandwich Islands but its status there is unclear. It breeds inland on upland grasslands but lives on the coast outside breeding season.

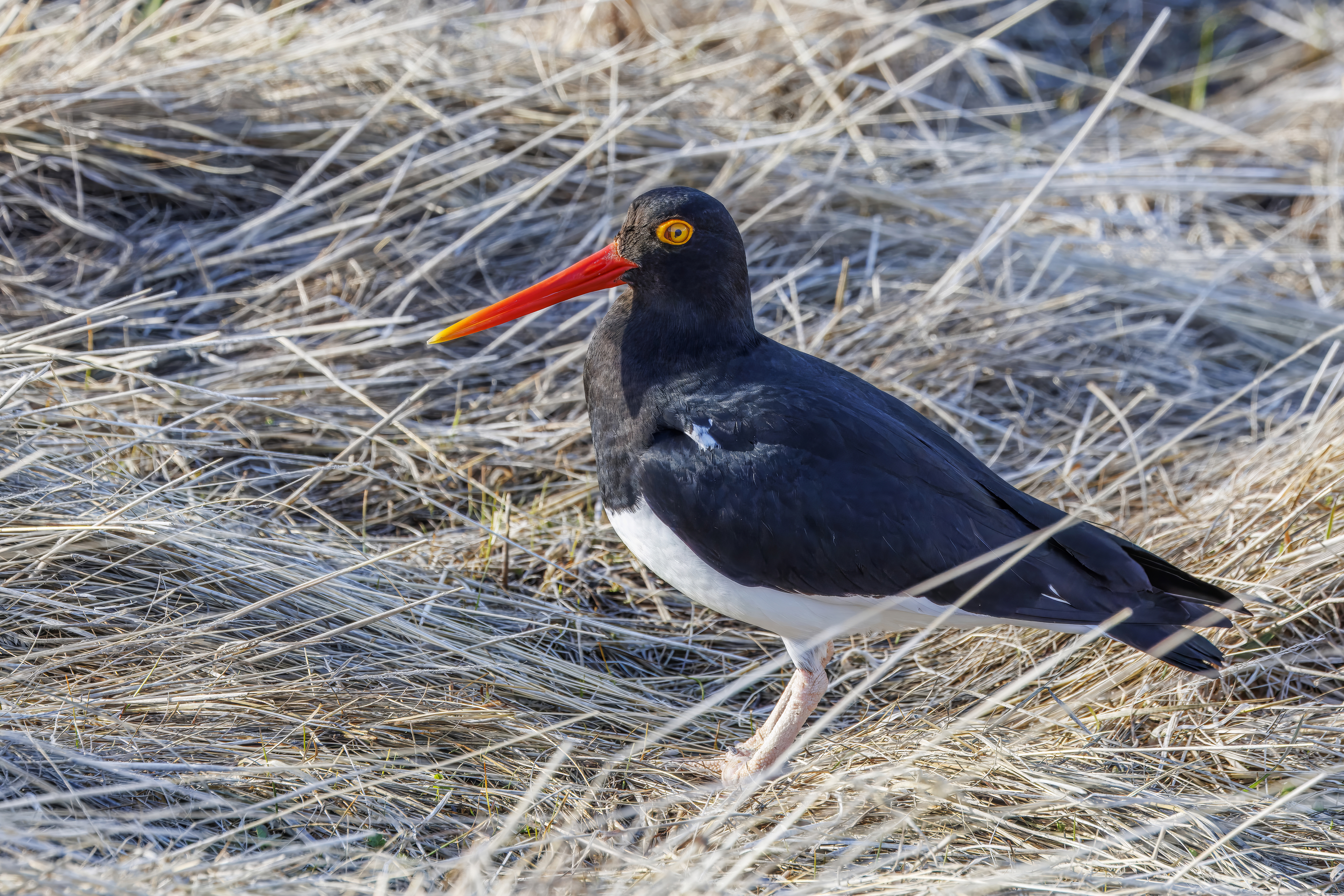
in Patagonia, Chile

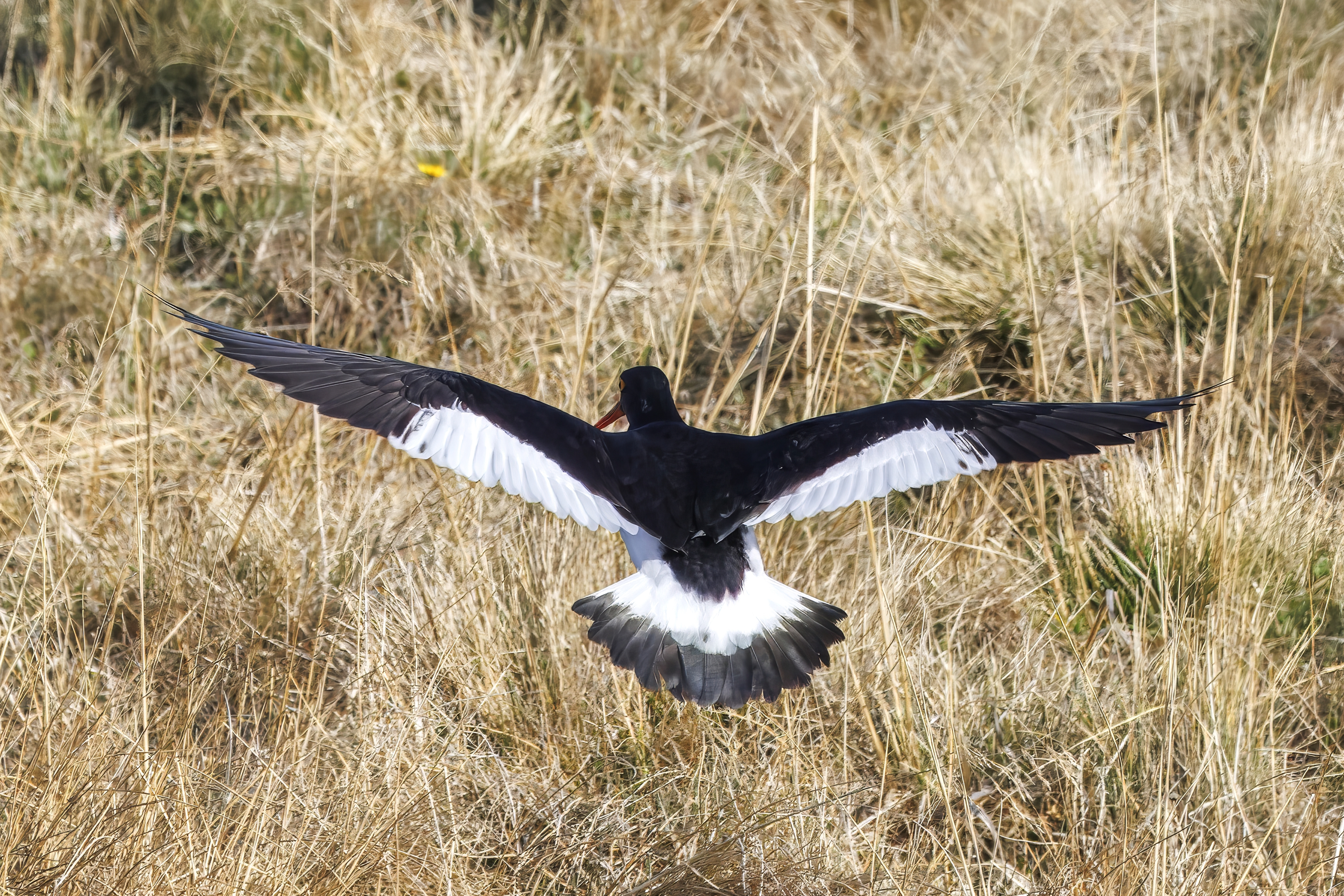
showing wings

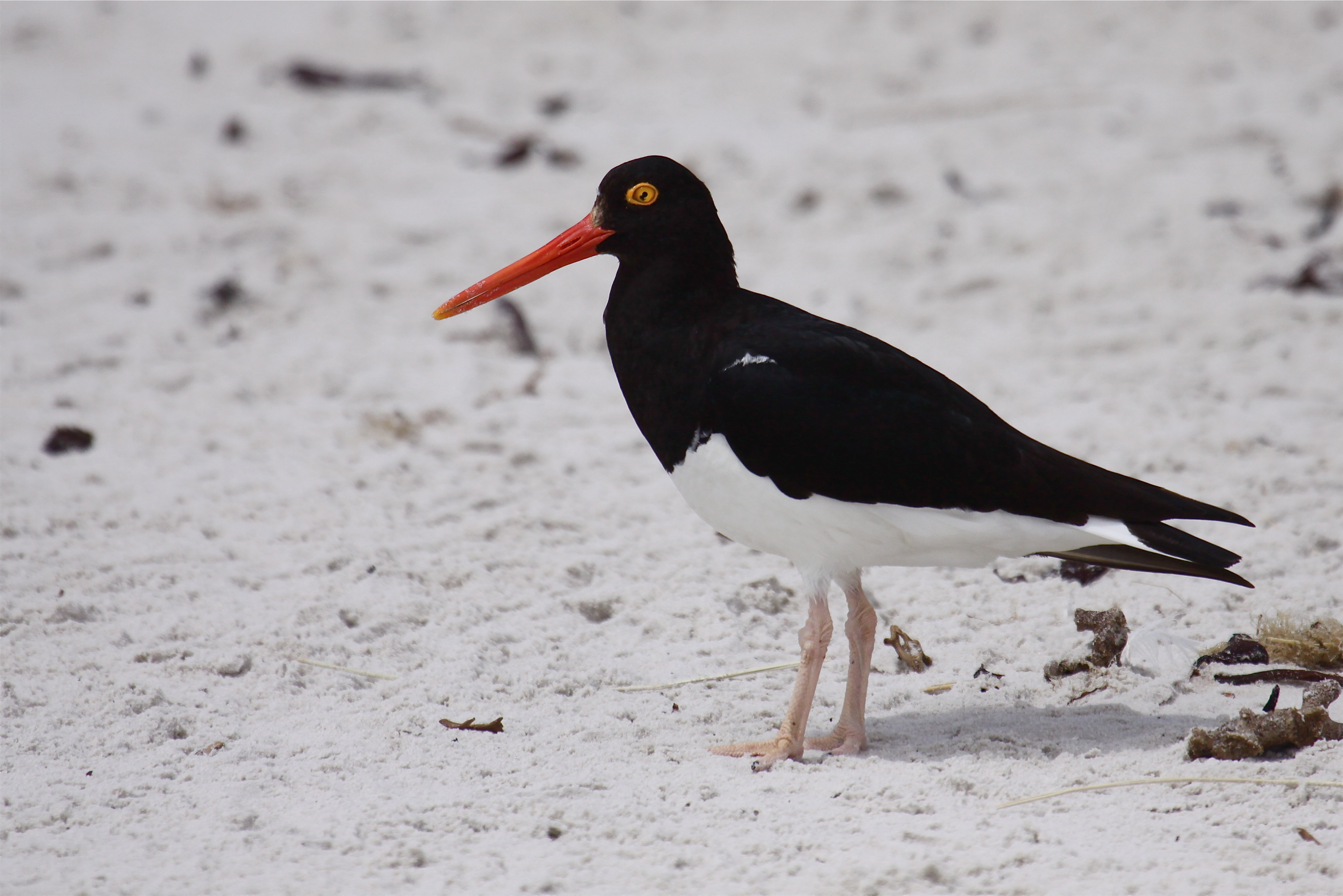
on the Falkland Islands

== Ecology ==
When inland during breeding season, the Magellanic oystercatcher feeds largely on earthworms and insect larvae, probing soft ground and mud with its sharp beak. At other times of year when at the coast it forages for mussels and limpets and feeds on crabs and polychaete worms.

When disturbed near the nest it engages in several strategies to divert attention from its eggs and chicks. These include false-brooding, when it moves to sit on an imaginary nest site, and tail-flagging, a ritual aggressive display involving raising tail and wings. It also has a distinctive peeping call to warn off intruders.
