= Steenbok Nature Reserve =

Nature reserve in the Western Cape, South Africa

Coordinates: 34°03′57″S 23°03′39″E

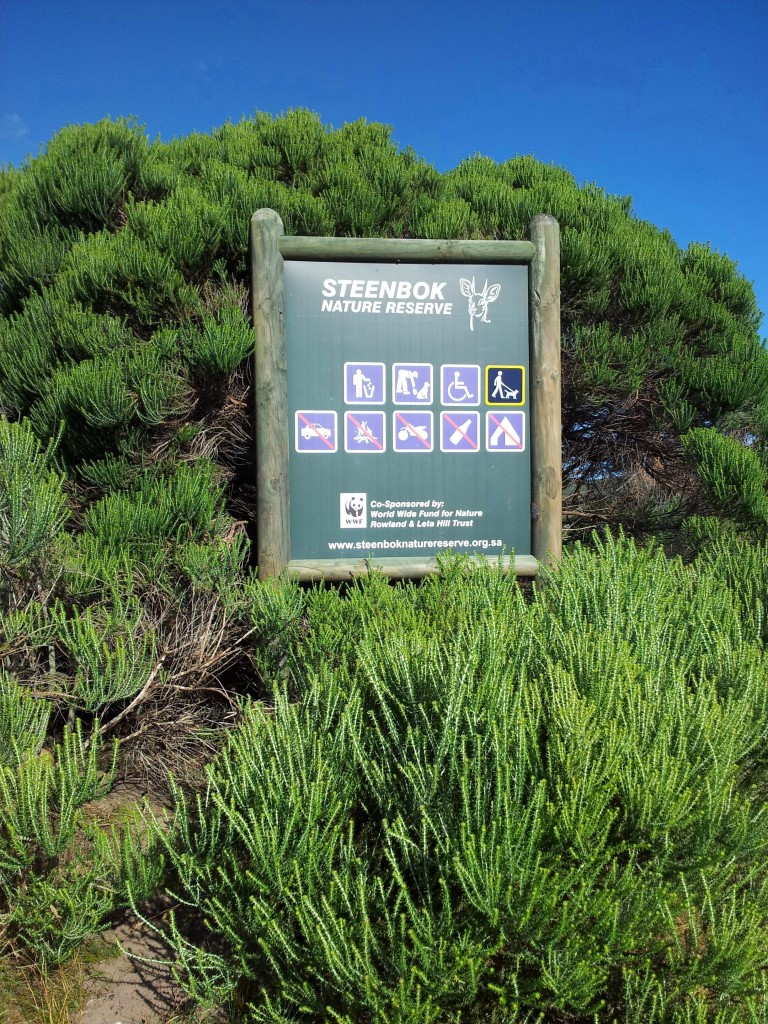
Steenbok Nature Reserve

Steenbok Nature Reserve is a small nature reserve, founded in 2005 on Leisure Island in the Knysna Lagoon. It is located some 4 km (2.5 mi) south of Knysna Central in the Western Cape, South Africa. There are two primary sections, Steenbok Park and the western part of Kingfisher Creek. It is flanked by Links Drive.

The reserve occupies an area of 17 ha (42 acres) and is situated along the northern shores and consists of open grassland, small copses of trees and bush and stretches of salt marsh and is bounded by one side with the sea. The reserve was once a nine-hole golf course, with plans to convert it into a nature reserve commencing in the 1990s.

Facilities at the reserve include nature trails, a wheel chair path, play areas, boardwalks, indigenous gardens and tree copses, a boma, bins and a stretch of shoreline. There are many story boards documenting facts about the salt marshes, the Knysna sea horse, and the aquifer of fresh water found beneath the surface.

The area provides habitat for over 200 species of flowering plants and over 100 different tree species. Fauna including a variety of frogs, butterflies, fish and a wide variety of bird species are found in the reserve. Commonly sighted specimens include malachite kingfisher, pied kingfisher, spoonbill, heron, sandpiper, white-breasted gannet, cape gannet and the black oystercatcher.
