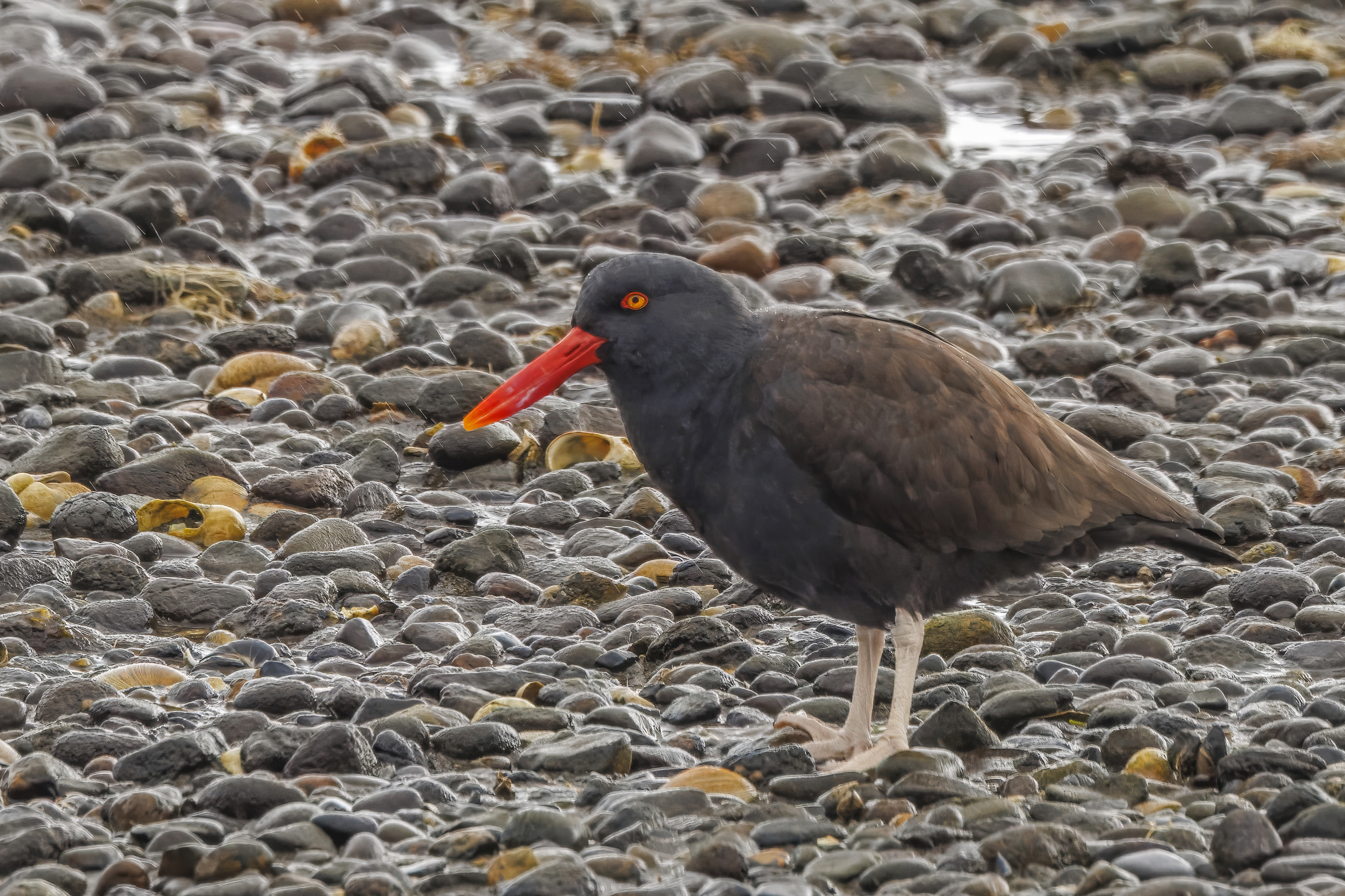

Conservation status
- Least Concern (IUCN 3.1)

Scientific classification
- Kingdom: Animalia
- Phylum: Chordata
- Class: Aves
- Order: Charadriiformes
- Family: Haematopodidae
- Genus: Haematopus
- Species: H. ater

Binomial name
- Haematopus ater Vieillot, 1825
- Year-round Breeding

= Blackish oystercatcher =

Wading bird in the family Haematopodidae

The blackish oystercatcher (Haematopus ater) is a species of wading bird in the oystercatcher family Haematopodidae. It is found in Argentina, Chile, the Falkland Islands and Peru, and is a vagrant to Uruguay. The population is estimated at 15,000–80,000.

== Description ==
The blackish oystercatcher's plumage is slaty-black with wings and back rather dark brown. The long bill is blood-red and the legs are white. The sexes are similar in appearance. The bird is easily overlooked on a rocky shore, its dark colour blending with the rocks on which it walks as it forages, and it does not draw attention to itself. Its presence, however, can easily be detected by its loud and distinctive warning calls. Its song, when given in duet, consists of an excited chatter of piping whistles. Calls include notes that sound like "pip" and "peeeeyeeee".

== Distribution and habitat ==
The blackish oystercatcher is native to the coasts of Argentina, Chile, the Falkland Islands and Peru, and it is a vagrant to Uruguay. Its natural habitats are rocky shores. It feeds in the intertidal zone on rocky shorelines, in rockpools and on pebble beaches. Rarely, it can be found on sandy beaches hunting for mole crabs.

== Status ==
The IUCN rates the blackish oystercatcher as being of "Least Concern". It is not clear whether the population is increasing or decreasing, but the bird has a very large range and a total population estimated to be somewhere between 15,000 and 80,000 individuals.

== Gallery ==
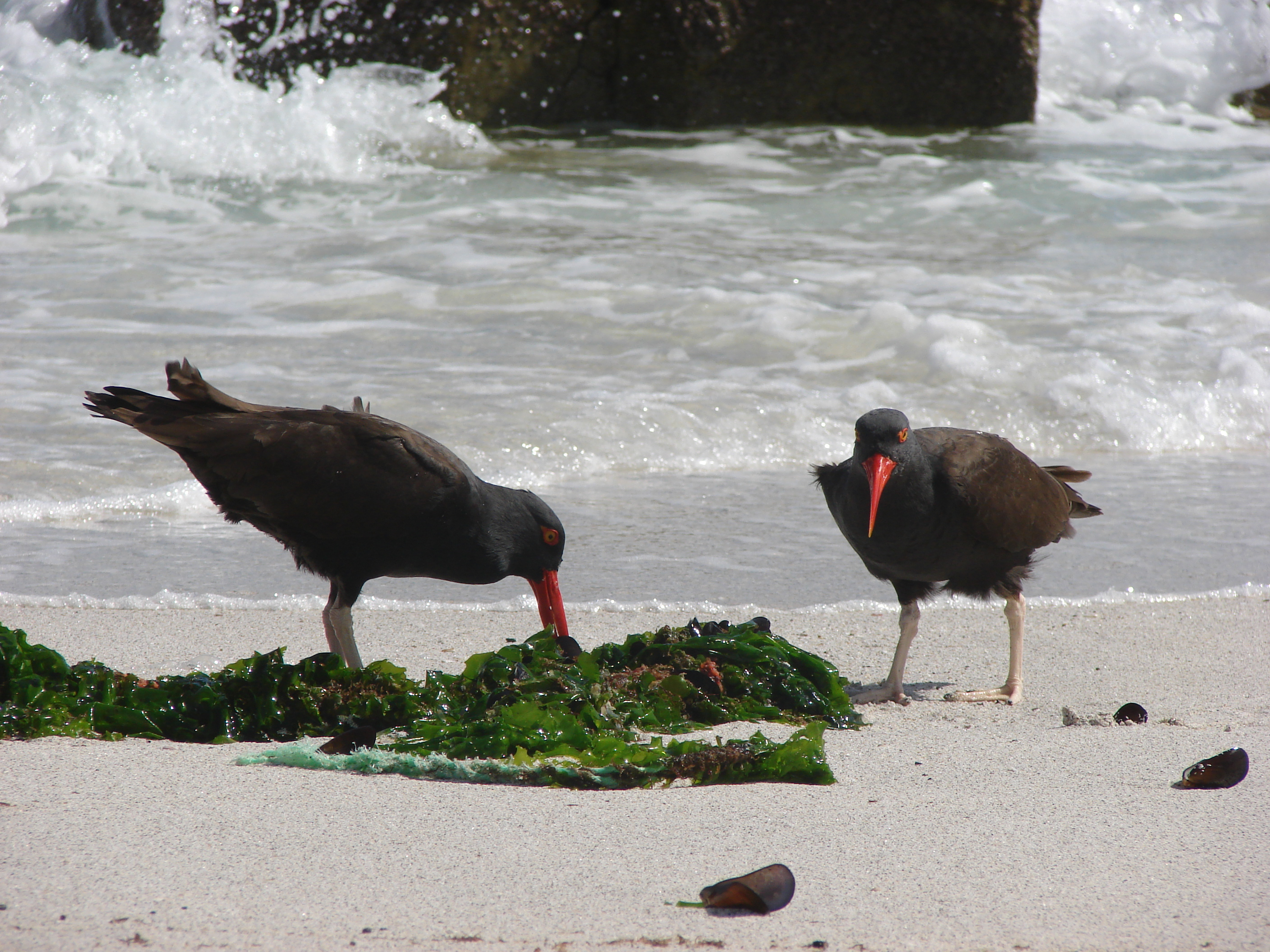
A pair feeding on some shellfish

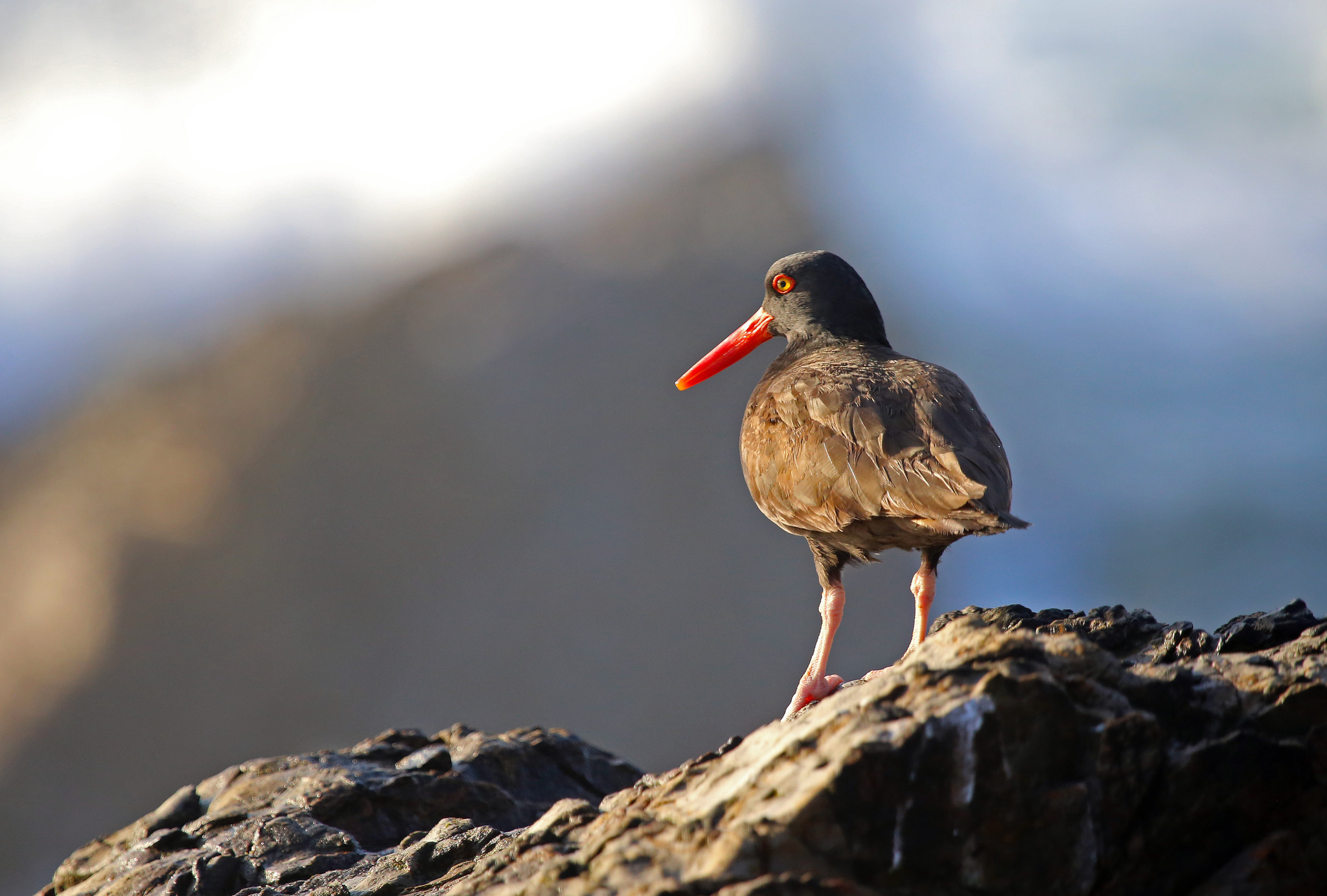
At the California Coastal National Monument

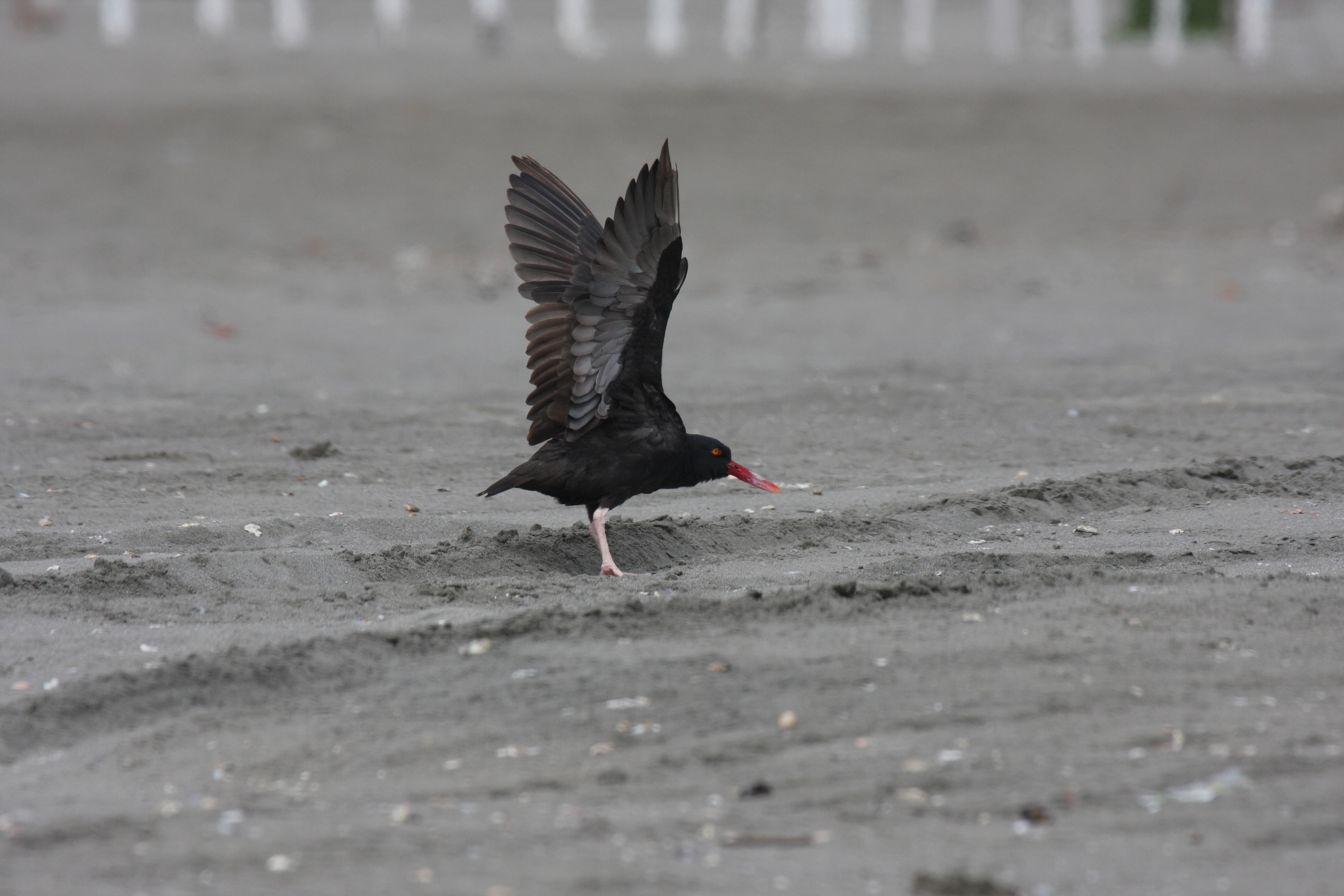
Wings spread

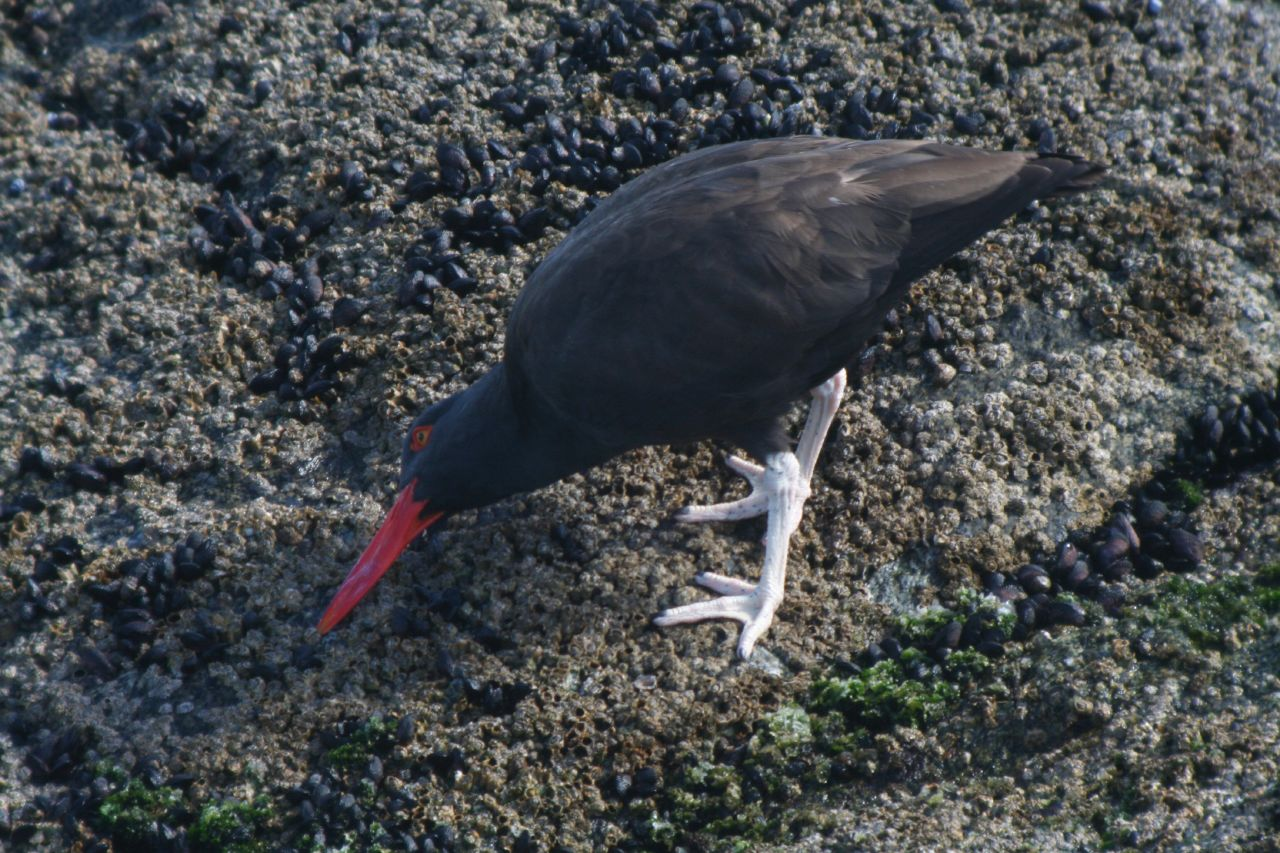
On a rock

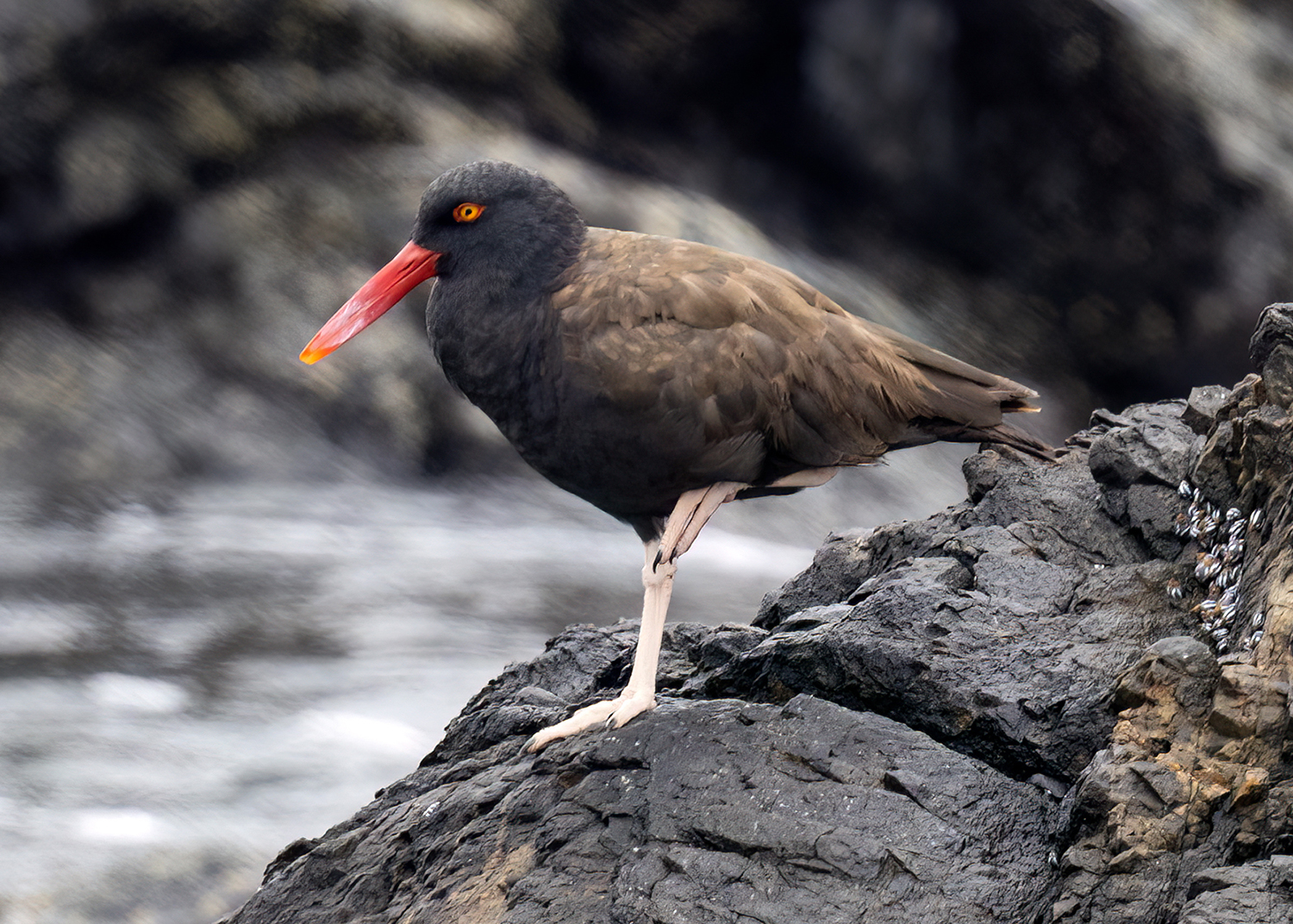

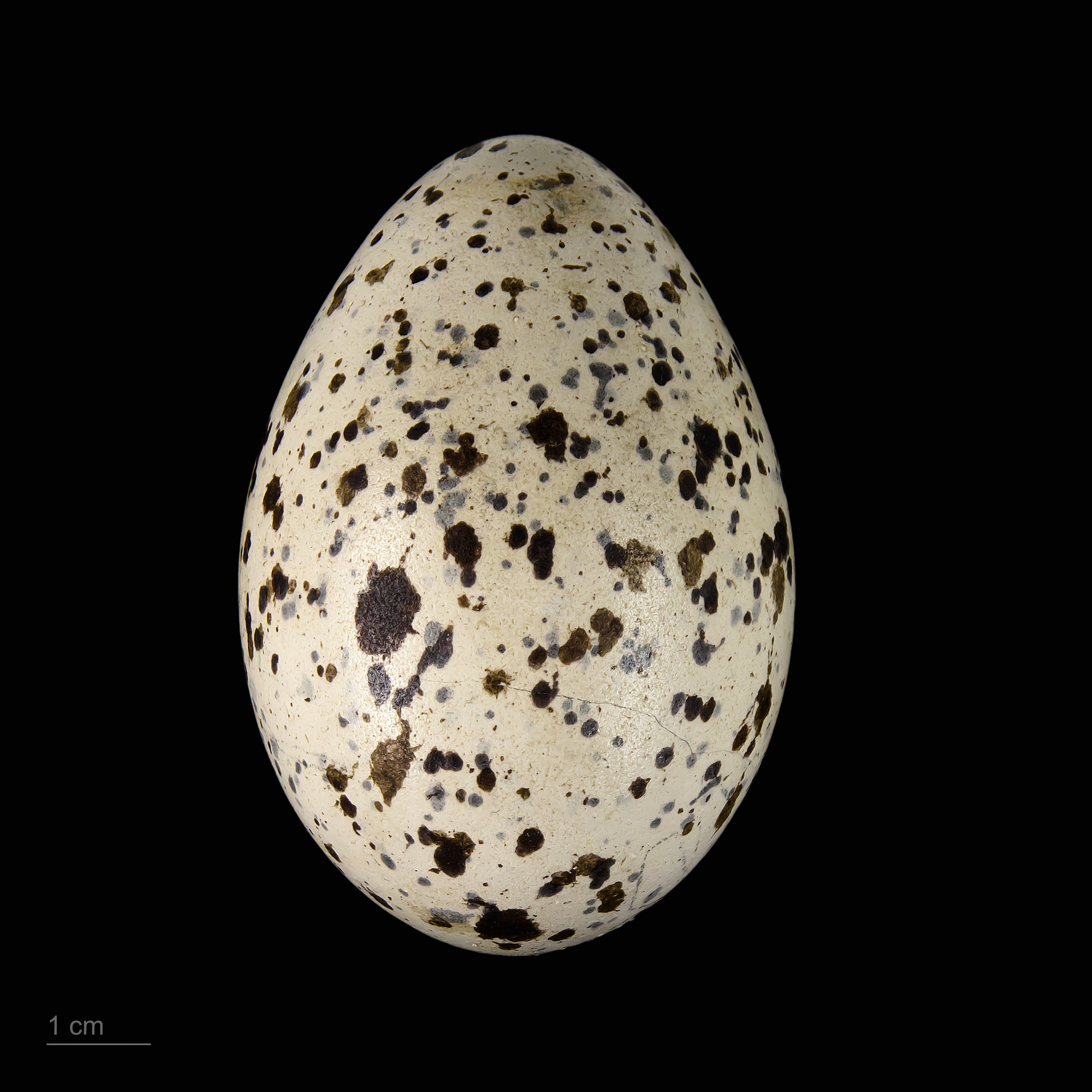
Haematopus ater - MHNT

== See also ==
- Black oystercatcher
