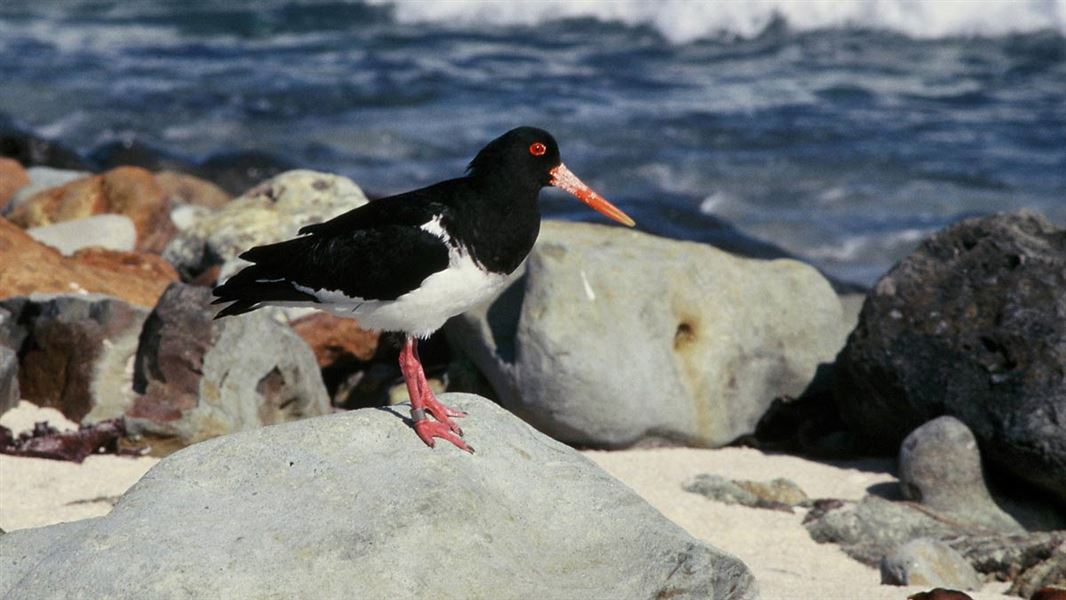

Conservation status
- Endangered (IUCN 3.1)

- Nationally Critical (NZ TCS)

Scientific classification
- Kingdom: Animalia
- Phylum: Chordata
- Class: Aves
- Order: Charadriiformes
- Family: Haematopodidae
- Genus: Haematopus
- Species: H. chathamensis

Binomial name
- Haematopus chathamensis Hartert, 1927
- Distribution map: Extant Possibly extant

Audio
- Call of the Chatham Islands oystercatcher

= Chatham Islands oystercatcher =

Species of bird

The Chatham Islands oystercatcher (Haematopus chathamensis) or tōrea tai (Māori), formerly known as the Chatham oystercatcher, is a species of oystercatcher. It is a wading bird endemic to the Chatham Islands, New Zealand. This species is rated by the IUCN as endangered, and has a current population of 310 to 325 birds (2004 census). The main threat is from introduced predators.

== Description ==
The Chatham Islands oystercatcher has distinctive black and white plumage and a long, thick orange-red beak. The head, neck, breast, back, wings and tail are black. The lower underparts are white with an unclear demarcation on the breast. The irises are red and the eyes have orange orbital rings. The short, thick legs are pink. Adults are about 48 centimetres (19 in) in length.

== Distribution ==
The Chatham Islands oystercatcher is only found on the Chatham Islands, an archipelago about 680 kilometres (420 mi) south east of New Zealand. Each of the four main islands has small breeding populations.

== Behaviour ==
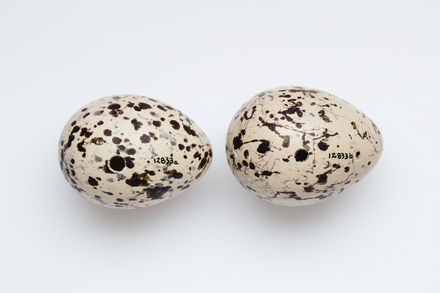
Haematopus chathamensis eggs from the collection of Auckland Museum

The Chatham Islands oystercatcher feeds on molluscs and marine worms, digging them out of the sand with its beak and hammering the shells to open them. They prefer foraging on coastline to lagoon shoreline, foraging mostly on intertidal rock platforms and sandy beaches (though some birds preferred pasture).

The nest is built on the beach on sandy or rocky shores and consists of a simple scrape. Sometimes it is built among low vegetation and may be rather more elaborate. Two or three eggs are usually laid. Young birds left their birth territory about 33 days after fledging. Juvenile birds become mature at about three years of age, and the lifespan is about eight years. The success rate of each pair averages 0.44 fledglings per breeding season, with flooding the main cause of egg loss.

== Status ==
In the late 1980s, the total population was less than 110 birds, and was feared to be declining. By 2006 the total population on the four Chatham Islands was estimated to be 310 to 360 individuals of which fewer than 250 were mature individuals. The population is believed to be stable; the IUCN rates the Chatham Islands oystercatcher as "Endangered", and the Department of Conservation as "Nationally Critical". The main threats faced by this bird are predation, particularly by feral cats on eggs and chicks, and the cattle and sheep which roam onto the beaches and may trample the nests. The introduced flightless weka (Gallirallus australis) is also a nest predator.
