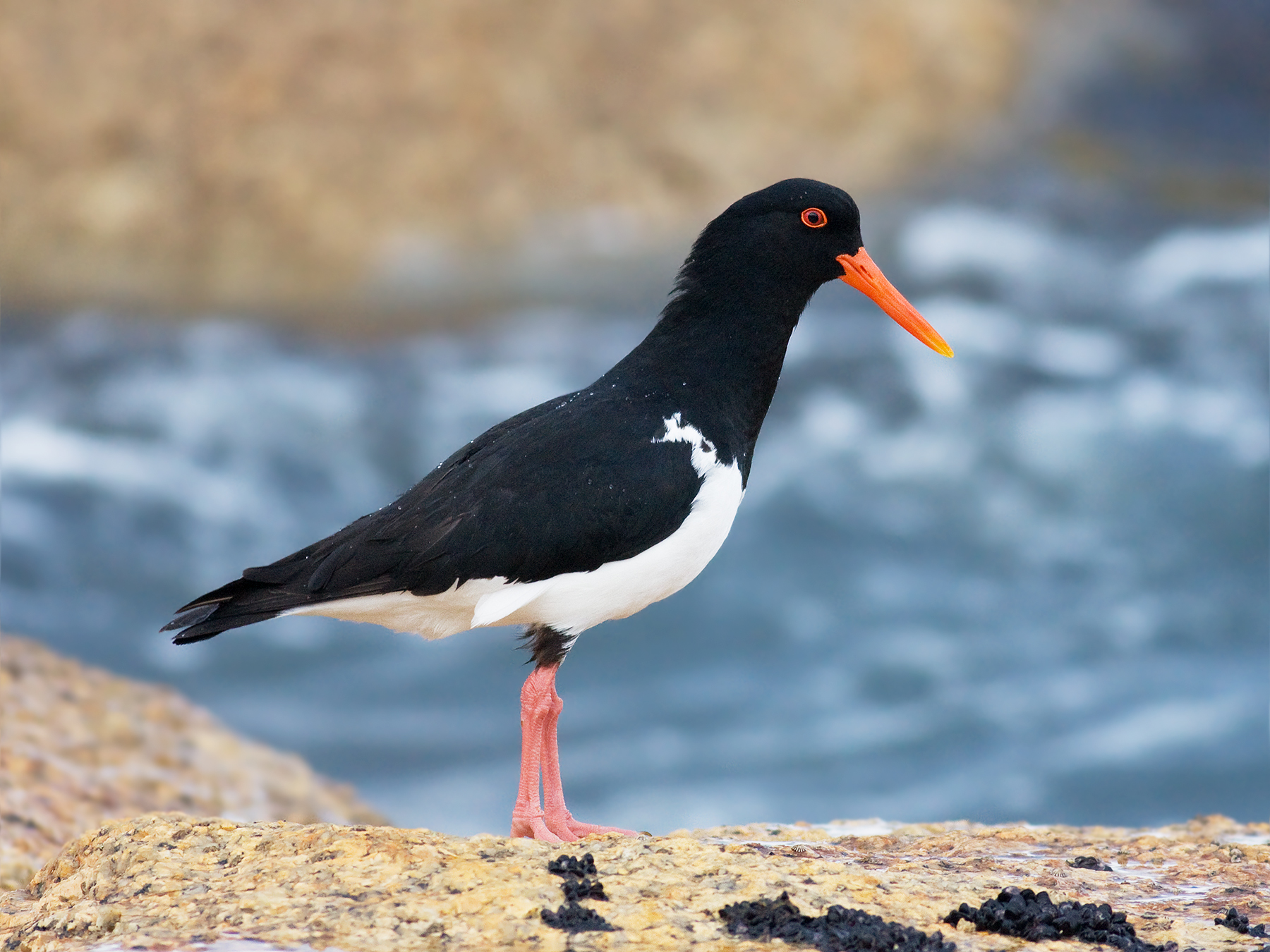
- Pied oystercatcher (Haematopus longirostris)

Scientific classification
- Kingdom: Animalia
- Phylum: Chordata
- Class: Aves
- Order: Charadriiformes
- Suborder: Charadrii
- Family: Haematopodidae; Bonaparte, 1838
- Genus: Haematopus; Linnaeus, 1758

Type species
- Haematopus ostralegus Linnaeus, 1758

Species
- Twelve, see table

= Oystercatcher =

Oystercatchers Temporal range: Middle Miocene – Recent

Genus of birds

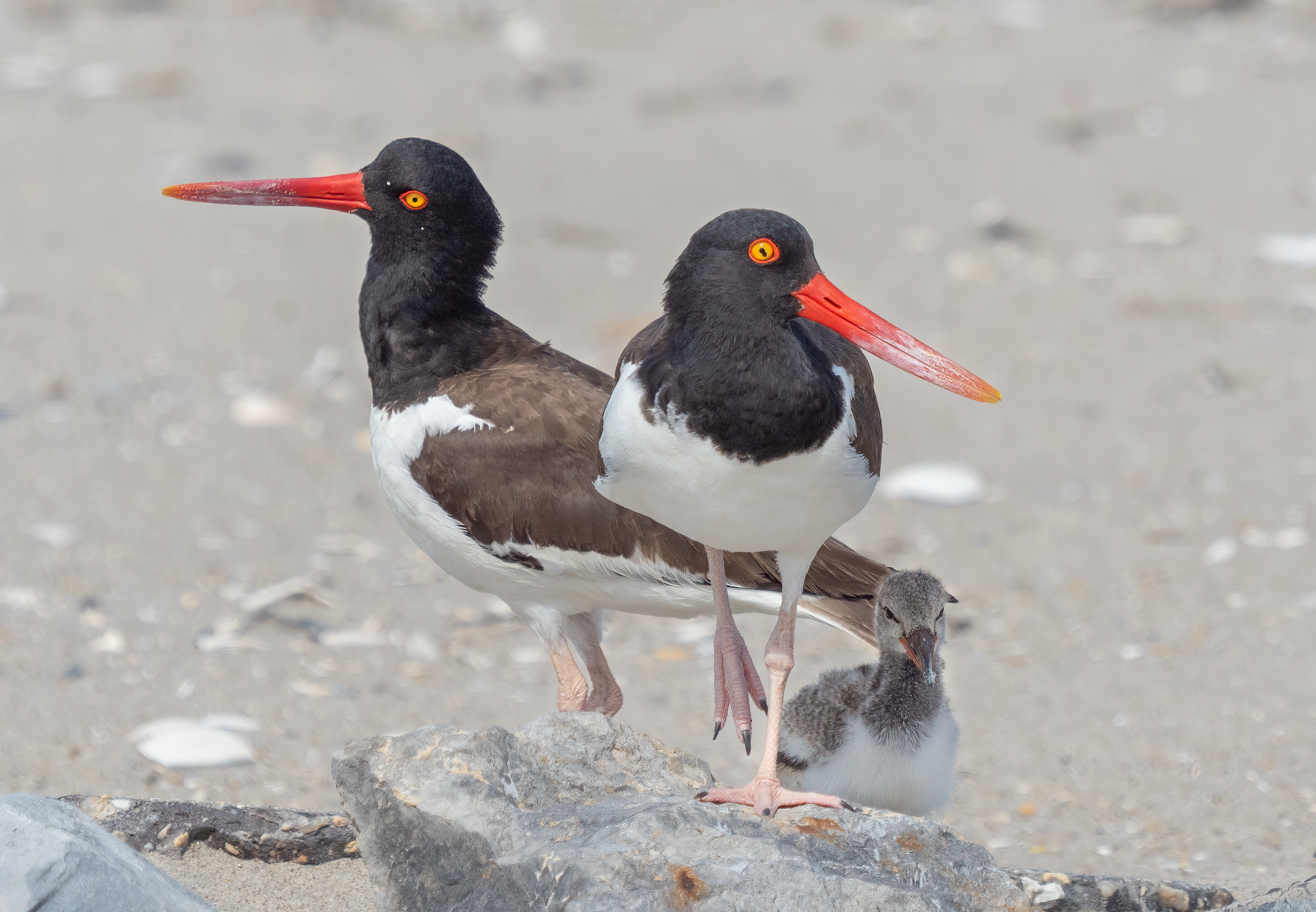
American oystercatchers with chick

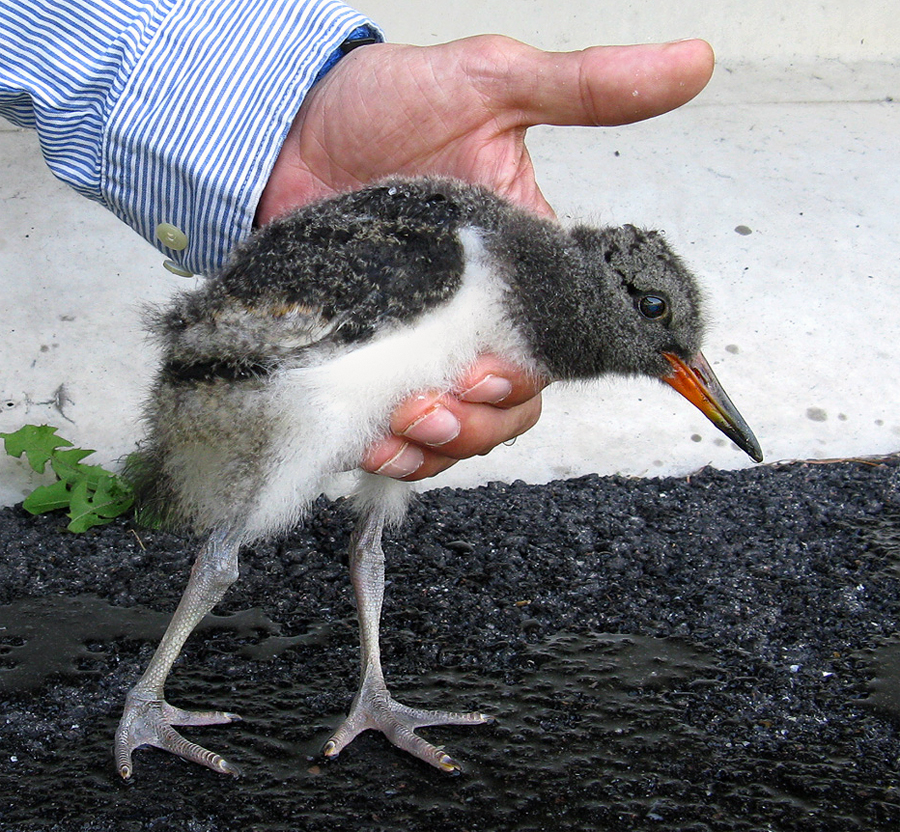
Juvenile

The oystercatchers are a group of waders forming the family Haematopodidae, which has a single genus, Haematopus. They are found on coasts worldwide, apart from the polar regions and some tropical regions of Africa and Southeast Asia. The exceptions to this are the Eurasian oystercatcher, the South Island oystercatcher, and the Magellanic oystercatcher, which also breed inland, far inland in some cases. In the past there has been a great deal of confusion as to the species' limits, with discrete populations of all black oystercatchers being afforded specific status but pied oystercatchers being considered one single species.

== Taxonomy ==
The genus Haematopus was introduced in 1758 by the Swedish naturalist Carl Linnaeus in 1758 in the tenth edition of his Systema Naturae to accommodate a single species, the Eurasian oystercatcher Haematopus ostralegus. The genus name Haematopus comes from the Ancient Greek words haima αἳμα meaning blood, and pous πούς meaning foot, referring to the red legs of the Eurasian oystercatcher; it had been in use since Pierre Belon in 1555. The family Haematopodidae was introduced (as the subfamily Haematopodinae) by the French naturalist Charles Bonaparte in 1838.

The common name oystercatcher was coined by Mark Catesby in 1731 for the North American species H. palliatus, which he described as eating oysters. The English zoologist William Yarrell in 1843 established this as the preferred term, replacing the older name sea pie, although the term had earlier been used by the Welsh Naturalist Thomas Pennant in 1776 in his British Zoology.

== Description ==
The different species of oystercatcher show little variation in shape or appearance. They range from 39–50 centimetres (15 1/2–19 1/2 inches) in length and 72–91 cm (28 1/2–36 in) in wingspan. The Eurasian oystercatcher is the lightest on average, at 526 grams (1 pound 2 1/2 ounces), while the sooty oystercatcher is the heaviest, at 819 g (1 lb 13 oz). The plumage of all species is either all-black, or black (or dark brown) on top and white underneath.

The variable oystercatcher is slightly exceptional in being either all-black or pied. They are large, obvious, and noisy plover-like birds, with massive long orange or red bills used for smashing or prying open molluscs. The bill shape varies between species, according to the diet. Those birds with blade-like bill tips pry open or smash mollusc shells, and those with pointed bill tips tend to probe for annelid worms. They show sexual dimorphism, with females being longer-billed and heavier than males.

== Feeding ==
The diet of oystercatchers varies with location. Species occurring inland feed upon earthworms and insect larvae. The diet of coastal oystercatchers is more varied, although dependent upon coast type; on estuaries, bivalves, the ivy gastropods and polychaete worms are the most important part of the diet, whereas rocky shore oystercatchers prey upon limpets, mussels, gastropods, and chitons. Other prey items include echinoderms, fish, and crabs.

== Breeding ==
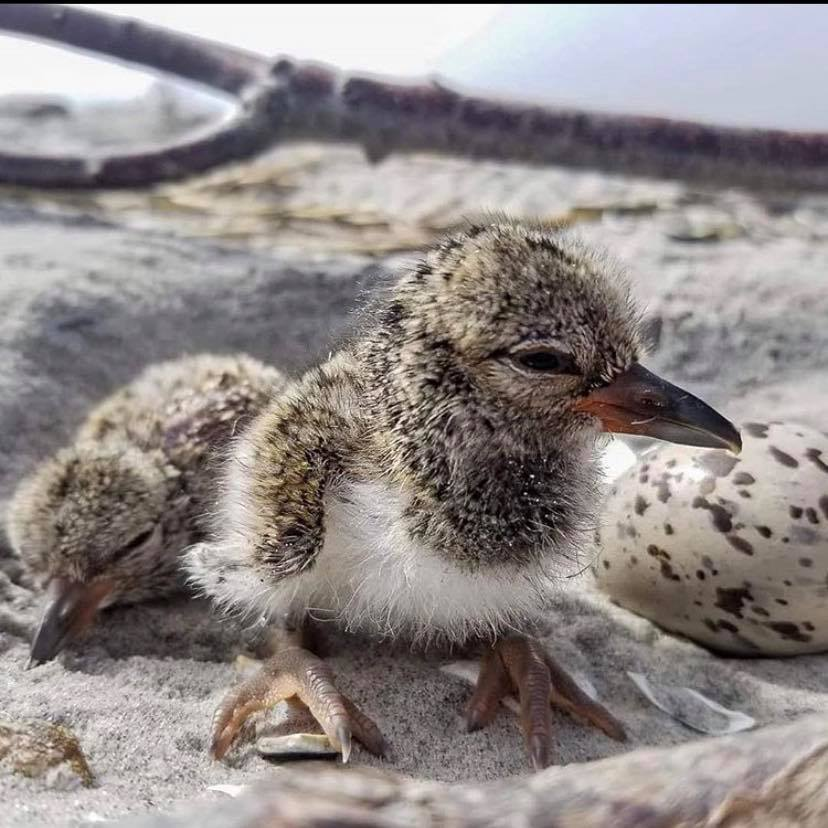
Oystercatcher chicks and eggs

Nearly all species of oystercatcher are monogamous, although there are reports of polygamy in the Eurasian oystercatcher. They are territorial during the breeding season (with a few species defending territories year round). There is strong mate and site fidelity in the species that have been studied, with one record of a pair defending the same site for 20 years. A single nesting attempt is made per breeding season, which is timed over the summer months. The nests of oystercatchers are simple affairs, scrapes in the ground which may be lined, and placed in a spot with good visibility.

The eggs of oystercatchers are spotted and cryptic. Between one and four eggs are laid, with three being typical in the Northern Hemisphere and two in the south. Incubation is shared but not proportionally, females tend to take more incubation and males engage in more territory defence. Incubation varies by species, lasting between 24–39 days. Oystercatchers are also known to practice "egg dumping". Like the cuckoo, they sometimes lay their eggs in the nests of other species such as gulls, abandoning them to be raised by those birds.

== Conservation ==
The Canary Islands oystercatcher became extinct during the 20th century. The Chatham oystercatcher is endemic to the Chatham Islands of New Zealand and is listed as endangered by the IUCN, while both the African and Eurasian oystercatchers are considered near threatened. There has been conflict with commercial shellfish farmers, but studies have found that the impact of oystercatchers is much smaller than that of shore crabs.

== Species ==
The genus contains twelve Recent species. Species in taxonomic order:

Genus Haematopus – Linnaeus, 1758 – twelve species
Common name	Scientific name and subspecies	Range	Size and ecology	IUCN status and estimated population
Magellanic oystercatcher	Haematopus leucopodus Garnot, 1826	Southern South America	Size: Habitat: Diet:	LC
Blackish oystercatcher	Haematopus ater Vieillot & Oudart, 1825	South America	Size: Habitat: Diet:	LC
Black oystercatcher	Haematopus bachmani Audubon, 1838	West coast of North America	Size: Habitat: Diet:	LC
American oystercatcher	Haematopus palliatus Temminck, 1820	North and South America	Size: Habitat: Diet:	LC
† Canary Islands oystercatcher	Haematopus meadewaldoi Bannerman, 1913	Canary Islands	Size: Habitat: Diet:	EX
African oystercatcher	Haematopus moquini (Bonaparte, 1856)	Southern Africa	Size: Habitat: Diet:	LC
Eurasian oystercatcher or Palaearctic oystercatcher	Haematopus ostralegus Linnaeus, 1758 Four subspecies: H. o. ostralegus Linnaeus, 1758; H. o. longipes Buturlin, 1910; H. o. buturlini Dementiev, 1941; H. o. osculans Swinhoe, 1871	Europe, Asia and northern Africa	Size: Habitat: Diet:	NT
Pied oystercatcher	Haematopus longirostris Vieillot, 1817	Australia	Size: Habitat: Diet:	LC
South Island oystercatcher	Haematopus finschi Martens, 1897	New Zealand	Size: Habitat: Diet:	LC
Chatham oystercatcher	Haematopus chathamensis Hartert, 1927	Chatham Islands	Size: Habitat: Diet:	EN
Variable oystercatcher	Haematopus unicolor (Forster, 1844)	New Zealand	Size: Habitat: Diet:	LC
Sooty oystercatcher	Haematopus fuliginosus Gould, 1845	Australia	Size: Habitat: Diet:	LC

=== Fossil record ===
The earliest fossil of a Haematopus-like bird is a skull from the Miocene of Saint-Gérand-le-Puy, France. The only other pre-Pleistocene fossils are from the Pliocene of the east coast of North America. Palostralegus sulcatus was described from the Barstovian of Florida, but is now considered to belong to the modern genus. Two taxa are also known from the Pliocene Yorktown Formation of North Carolina, and have been referred to H. aff. palliatus and H. aff. ostralegus.
