= Black oystercatcher =

Conservation status
- Least Concern (IUCN 3.1)

Scientific classification
- Kingdom: Animalia
- Phylum: Chordata
- Class: Aves
- Order: Charadriiformes
- Family: Haematopodidae
- Genus: Haematopus
- Species: H. bachmani

Binomial name
- Haematopus bachmani Audubon, 1838

Synonyms
- Haematopus ater

Species of bird

The black oystercatcher (Haematopus bachmani) is a conspicuous black bird found on the shoreline of western North America, ranging from the Aleutian Islands of Alaska to the coast of the Baja California peninsula.

It is the only representative of the oystercatcher family (Haematopodidae) over most of its range, overlapping slightly with the American oystercatcher (H. palliatus) on the coast of Baja California. Within its range it is most commonly referred to as the black oystercatcher, although this name is also used locally for the blackish oystercatcher and the African oystercatcher. Its scientific name was derived by John James Audubon from that of his friend John Bachman.

Although the species is not considered threatened, its global population is estimated between 8,900–11,000. It is a species of high conservation concern throughout its range (U.S., Canadian, Alaskan, and Northern & Southern Pacific Shorebird Conservation Plans), a keystone indicator species along the north Pacific shoreline, a management indicator species in the Chugach National Forest, and a U.S. Fish & Wildlife Service focal species for priority conservation action.

== Description ==
The black oystercatcher is a large shorebird, with a black head, neck and breast and dark brown body, a long (9 cm (3.5 in)) bright red/orange bill and pink legs. It has a bright yellow iris and a red eye-ring. Its plumage varies slightly from north to south, being darker further north.

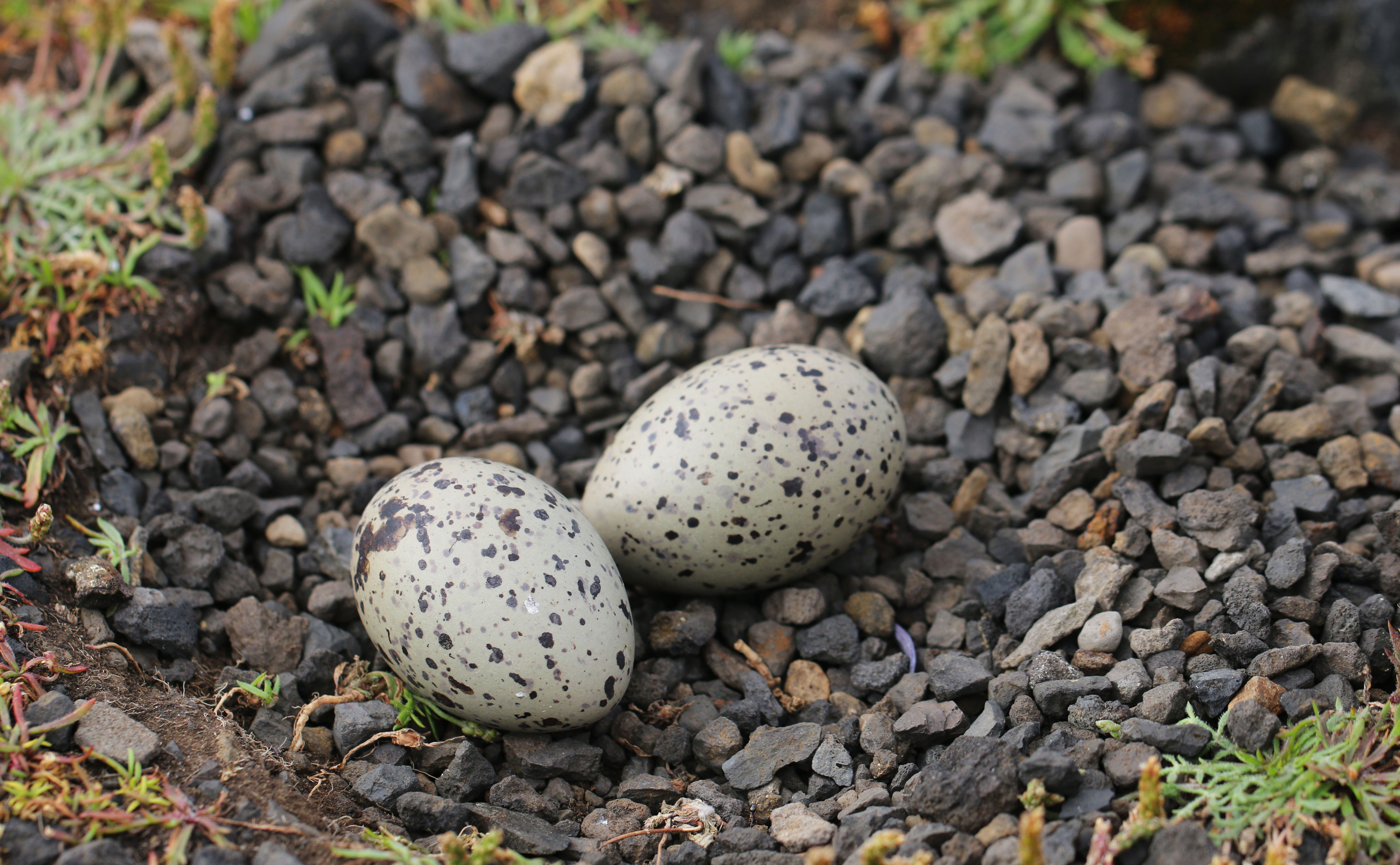
Nest

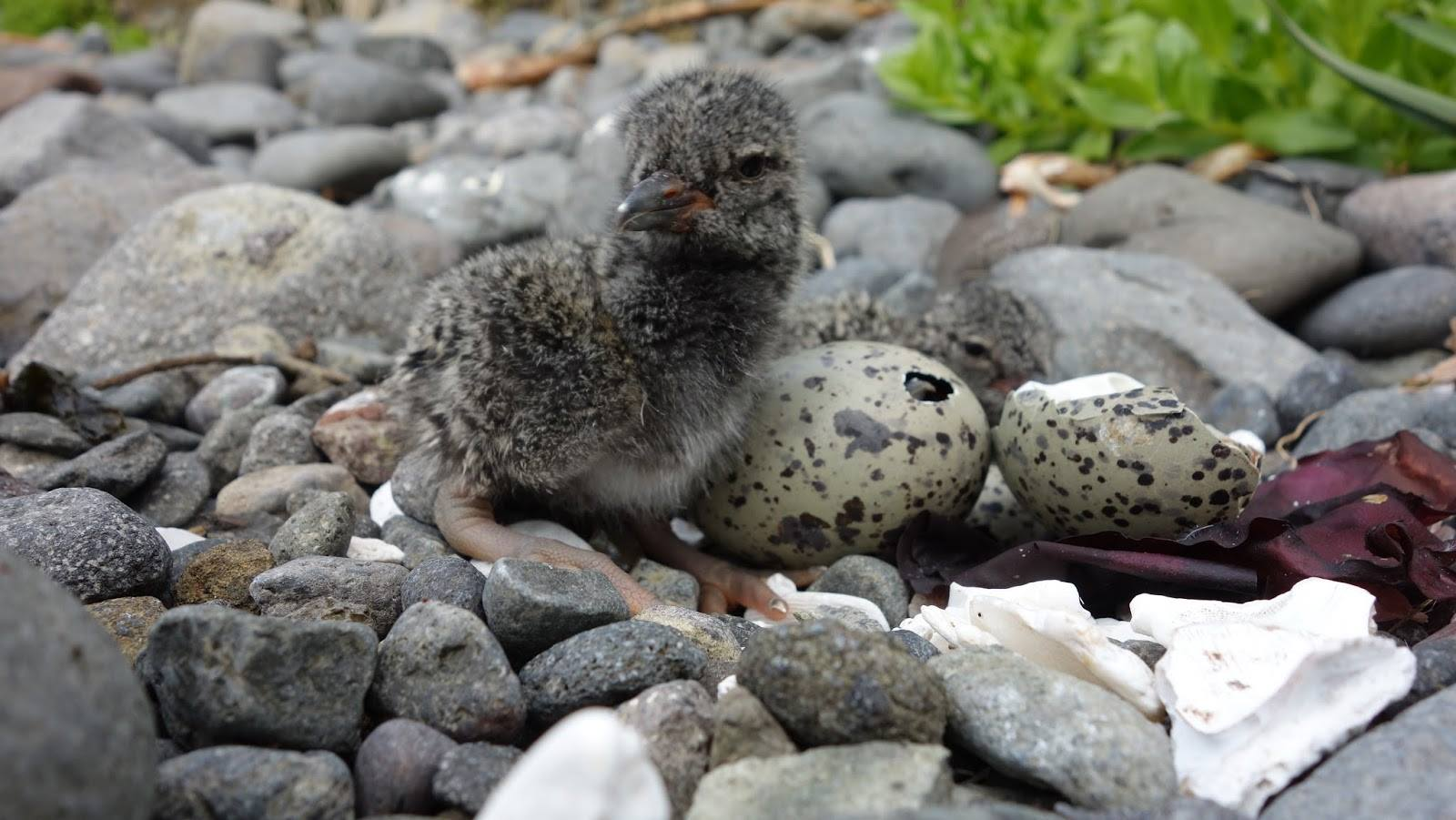
Chick on Aiktak Island, Alaska

Tofino, Vancouver Island

== Behavior ==
The bird is restricted in its range, never straying far from shores, in particular favoring rocky shorelines. It has been suggested that it is seen mostly on coastal stretches which have some quieter embayments, such as jetty protected areas. It forages in the intertidal zone, feeding on marine invertebrates, particularly molluscs such as mussels, limpets and chitons, but also on crabs, isopods and barnacles. It forages through the intertidal area, searching for food visually, often so close to the water's edge it has to fly up to avoid crashing surf. It uses its strong bill to dislodge food and pry shells open. At high tides, it is normally inactive and can be seen resting and awaiting tidal reversal.

Since black oystercatchers are territorial, especially during the nesting season, they can readily be detected by their loud vocalizations while flying, actively defending a foraging and nesting area in one territory. Some pairs have been recorded staying together for many years. Nests are small bowls or depressions close to the shore into which small pebbles and shell fragments are tossed with a sideward or backward flick of the bill.

Around two to three eggs are laid in this nest; they are very hard, and can even survive being submerged by a high tide or very high water levels. Incubation takes around 26–28 days. The chicks are capable of leaving the nest after one day, but stay in the territory for a long time after fledging (apx. 40 days). Fledged juveniles stay in the territory until the next breeding season. If the parents migrate, that year's chicks may migrate with them, most commonly in the north of the range.

== See also ==
- Blackish oystercatcher
