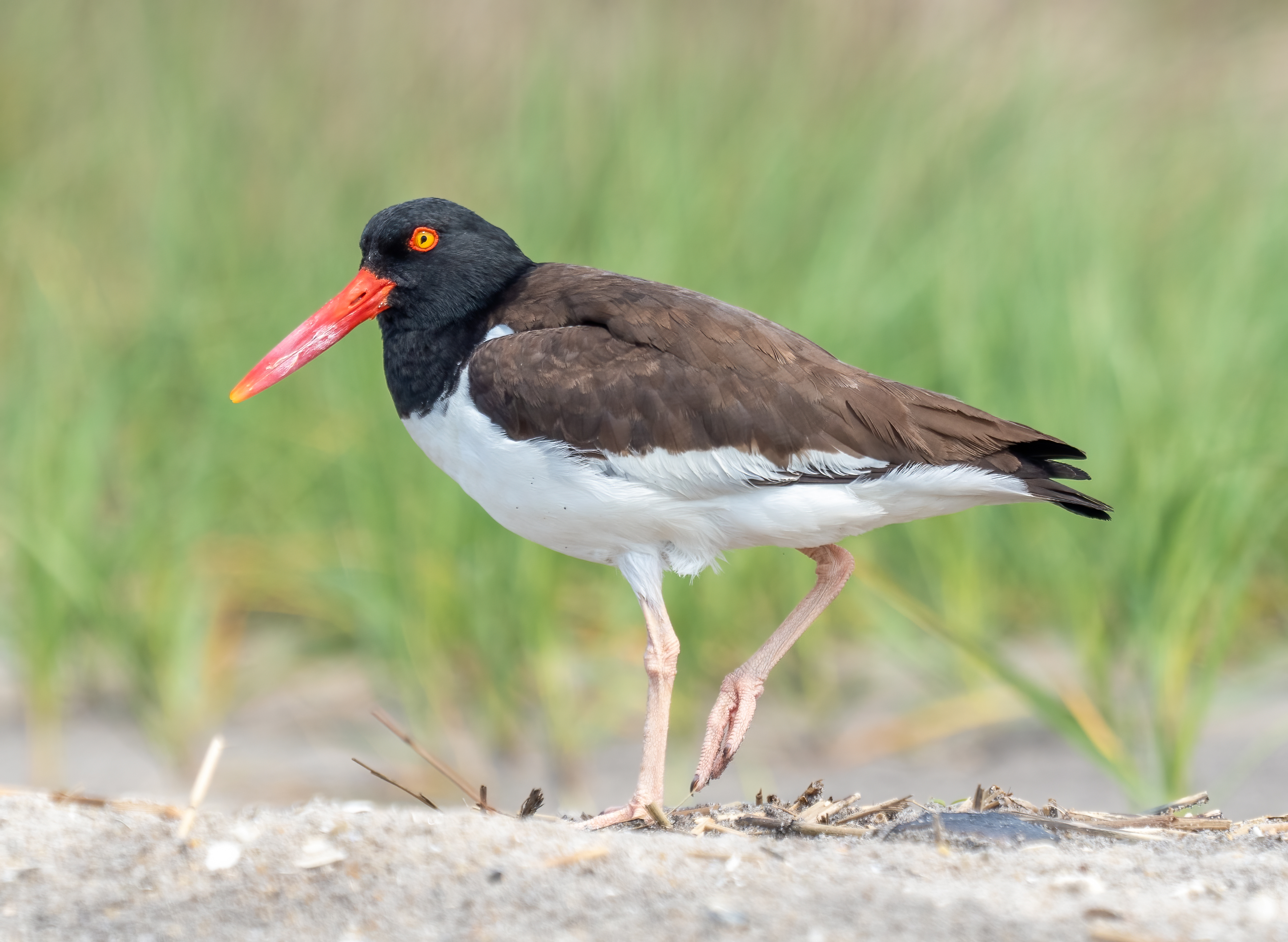
- American oystercatcher at Fort Tilden, New York

Conservation status
- Least Concern (IUCN 3.1)

Scientific classification
- Kingdom: Animalia
- Phylum: Chordata
- Class: Aves
- Order: Charadriiformes
- Family: Haematopodidae
- Genus: Haematopus
- Species: H. palliatus

Binomial name
- Haematopus palliatus Temminck, 1820
- Year-round Breeding Nonbreeding

= American oystercatcher =

Species of bird

The American oystercatcher (Haematopus palliatus), occasionally called the American pied oystercatcher, is a member of family Haematopodidae. Originally called the "sea pie", it was renamed in 1731 when naturalist Mark Catesby claimed that he had observed the bird eating oysters. The current population of American oystercatchers is estimated to be 50,000 – 99,999 mature individuals. There are estimated to be 1,500 breeding pairs along the Atlantic and Gulf Coasts of the US. The bird is marked by its black and white body and a long, thick orange beak.

== Description ==
The American oystercatcher has distinctive black and white plumage and a long, bright orange beak. The head and breast are black and the back, wings and tail greyish-black. The underparts are white, as are feathers on the inner part of the wing which become visible during flight. The irises are yellow and the eyes have orange orbital rings. The legs are pink. Adults are between 42–52 cm (17–20 in) in length.

== Distribution ==
The American oystercatcher is found on the Atlantic coast of North America from coastal Massachusetts to northern Florida, where it is also found on the Gulf coast, the Caribbean, and south to Brazil, Uruguay and Argentina. It is found also in the Pacific coast of California, Mexico, Central America, Peru, and Chile. In the 19th century they became locally extinct in the lower northeastern United States due to market hunting and egg collecting. After receiving protection under the Migratory Bird Treaty Act, their range extended northward to re-occupy historical habitat in the coastal Northeast.

During the breeding season, these birds are found along the Atlantic and Gulf Coasts and from Massachusetts south to Argentina and Chile. In winter, they are found in flocks along the coast from central New Jersey to the Gulf of Mexico.

== Habitat ==
During the breeding season, the American oystercatcher can be found in coastal habitats including sand or shell beaches, dunes, salt marshes, marsh islands, mudflats, and dredge spoil islands made of sand or gravel. During migration and winter, they are found feeding in mud or salt flats that are exposed by the tide. They are also found on shellfish beaches at this time.

== Behavior ==
Oystercatchers are closely tied to coastal habitats. They nest on beaches on coastal islands and feed on marine invertebrates. The large, heavy beak is used to pry open bivalve mollusks. Oystercatchers raise a clutch of two or three eggs.

=== Feeding ===
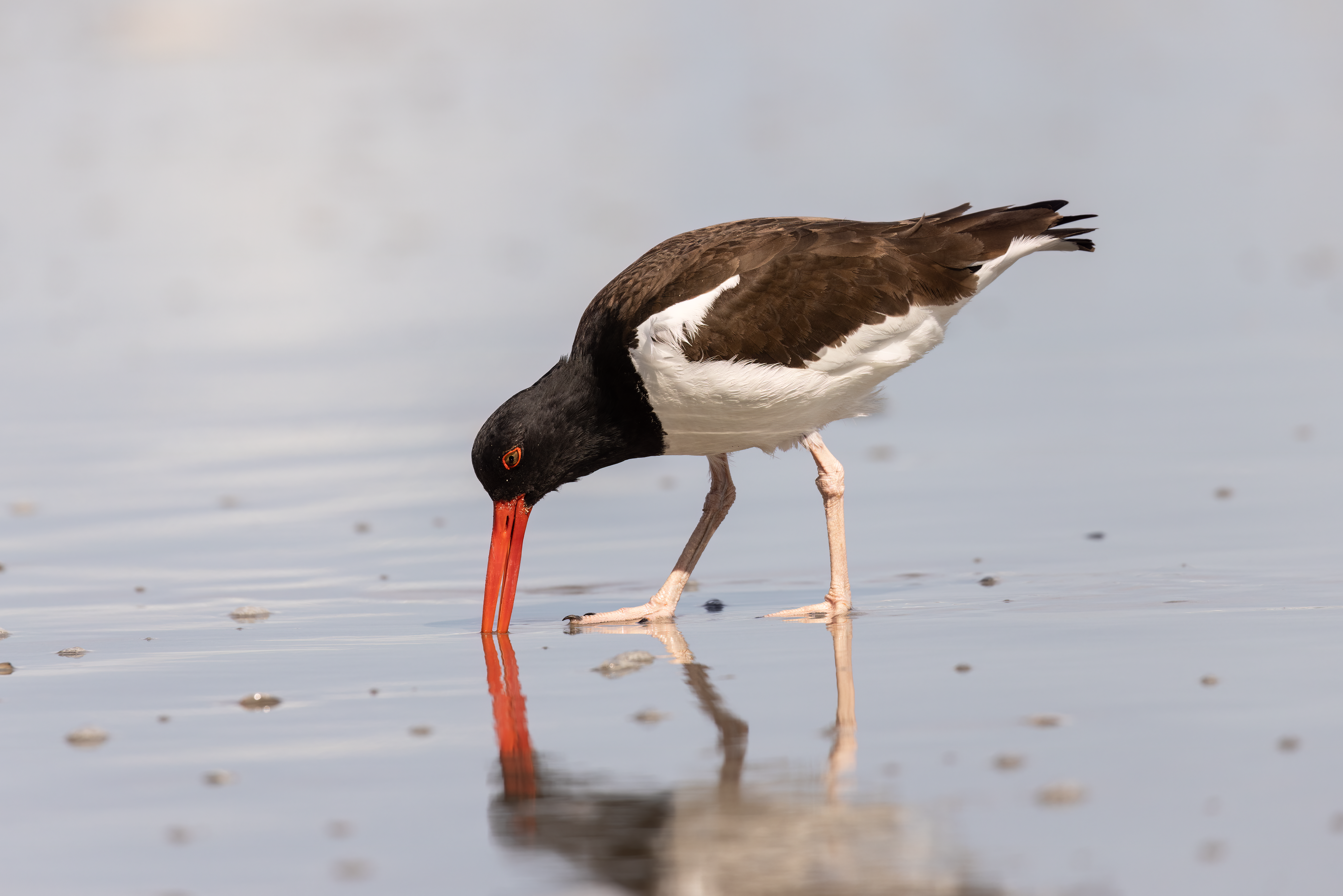
An American oystercatcher forages on the beach in Atlantic City, NJ.

The American oystercatcher feeds almost exclusively on shellfish and other marine invertebrates. Oysters are a staple of their diet, as their name suggests, but they also eat mussels, clams, limpets, sea urchins, starfish, crabs, and worms. In general, they use their bills to catch shellfish. As they walk across a shellfish bed, they look for a mollusk with a partially opened shell. When they find one, they jab their bill into the shell and sever the muscle that causes the shell to clamp shut. This can be dangerous, however, as they are sometimes drowned when they don't completely sever this muscle and the shell clamps down on their bill. A strong, tightly rooted mollusk can hold the bird in place until the tide comes in. They also feed by carrying loose shellfish out of the water and hammering at the shell or by probing the sand for soft-shell or razor clams.

=== Mating ===
American oystercatchers first breed at an age of 3–4 years.

When courting, the birds will walk together and make a single piping note. This progresses to leaning towards each other, extending and lowering the neck, and running alongside each other while calling. The pair may then burst into flight and fly in a tight formation around their territory.

== Reproduction ==
=== Nests ===
American oystercatchers breed between April and July. Their nests are shallow depressions scraped into the sand by an adult. Breeding adults will make 5 or more of these scrapes, then choose one to line with shells and/or pebbles. These depressions are about 8 inches (20 cm) across and 2.5 inches (6.4 cm) deep. A female oystercatcher lays 2–4 eggs per nest. Each egg is 2.2–2.3 in (5.6–5.8 cm) long and 1.5–1.6 in (3.8–4.1 cm) wide. The eggs are gray and speckled with dark brown.

Although the eggs are well camouflaged, they are vulnerable to predation by raccoons, coyotes, skunks, gulls, crows, rats, and foxes.

In Florida, American oystercatchers may be eaten by some growth stage of invasive snakes such as Burmese pythons, reticulated pythons, Central African rock pythons, Southern African rock pythons, boa constrictors, yellow anacondas, Bolivian anacondas, dark-spotted anacondas, and green anacondas.

Both parents will alternate incubating the eggs for 25 to 27 days.

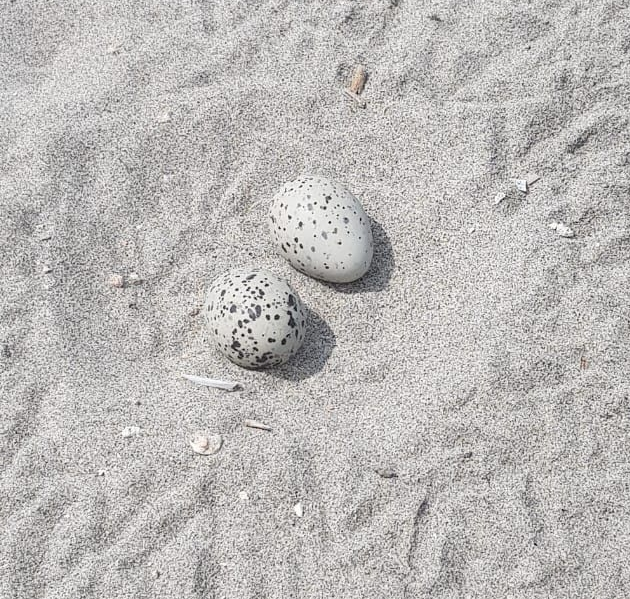
nest in a beach near Lima

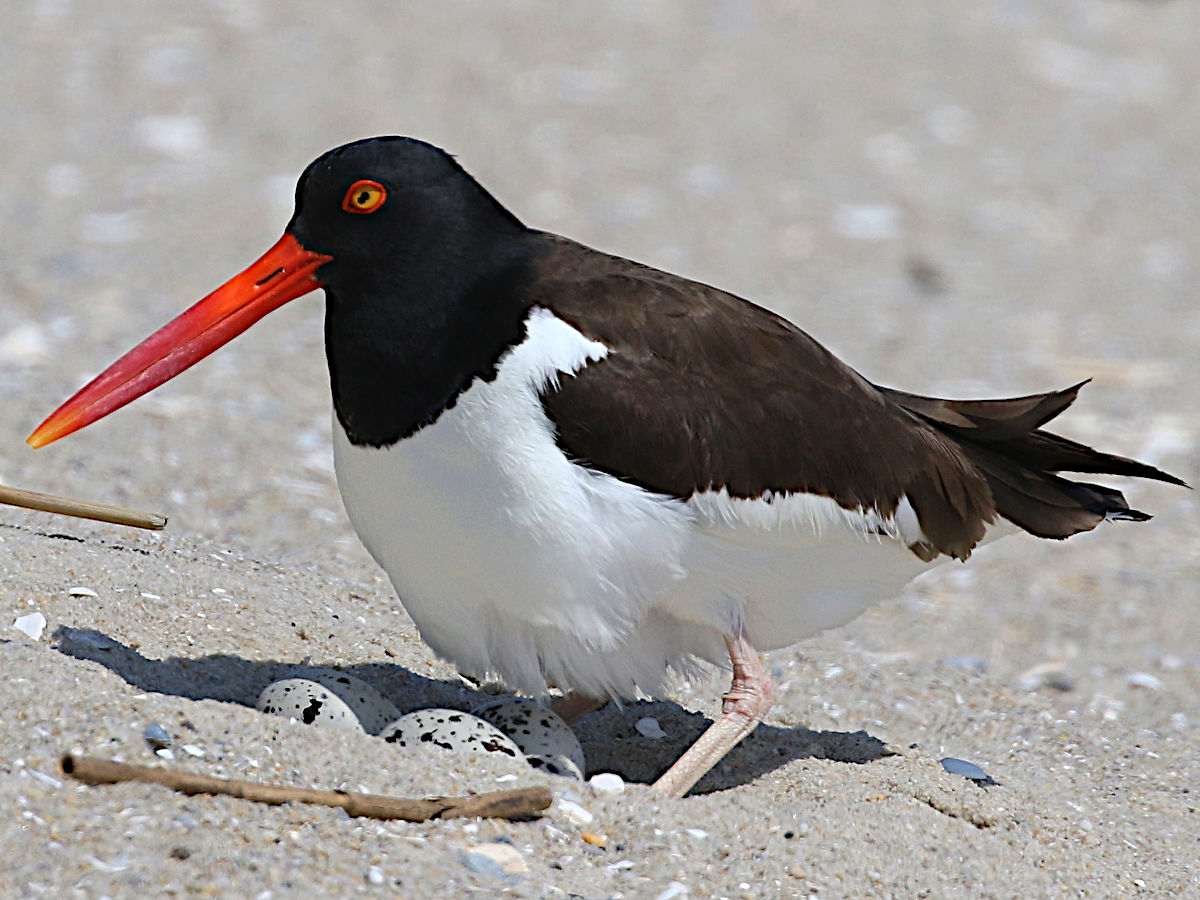
One parent tending eggs Cape May Point State Park, USA

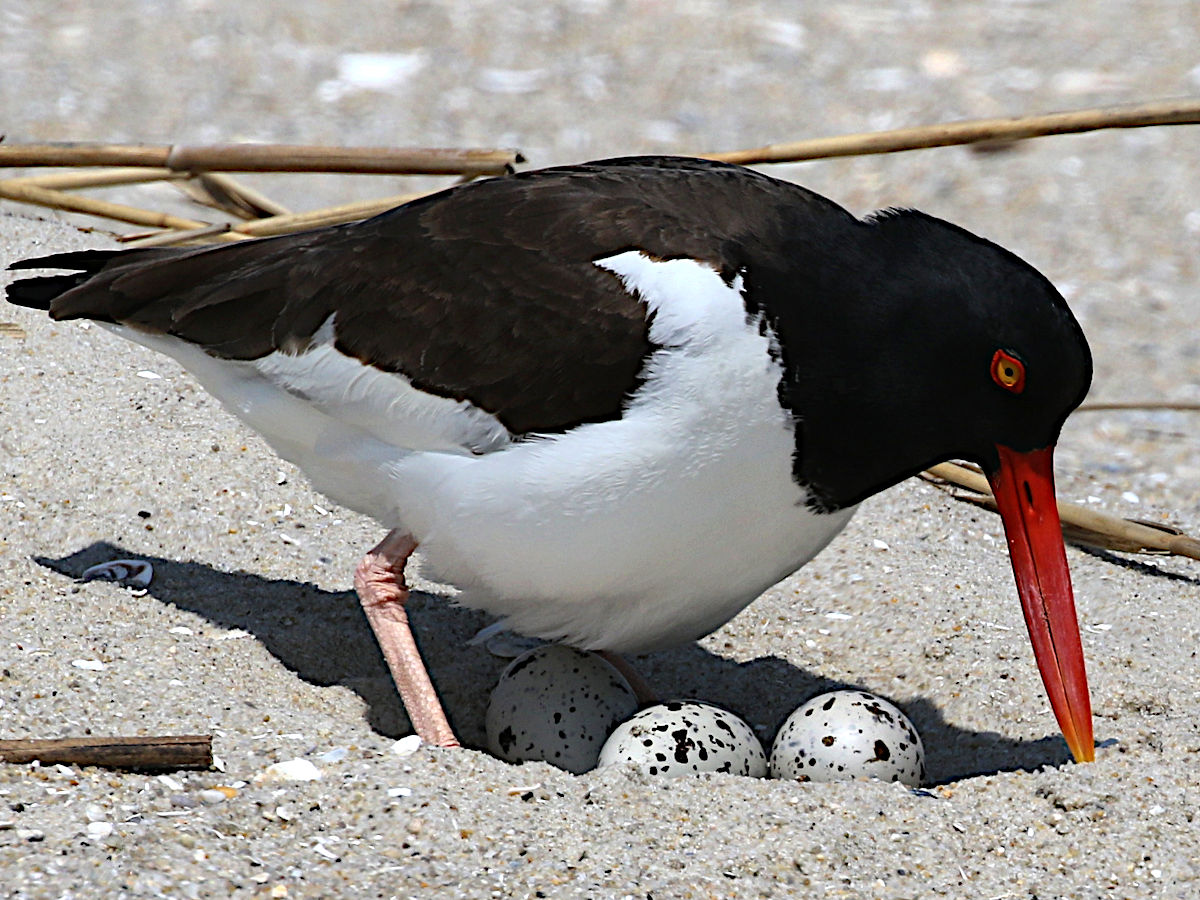
20 minutes later, its mate assumes incubation duties.

=== Chicks ===
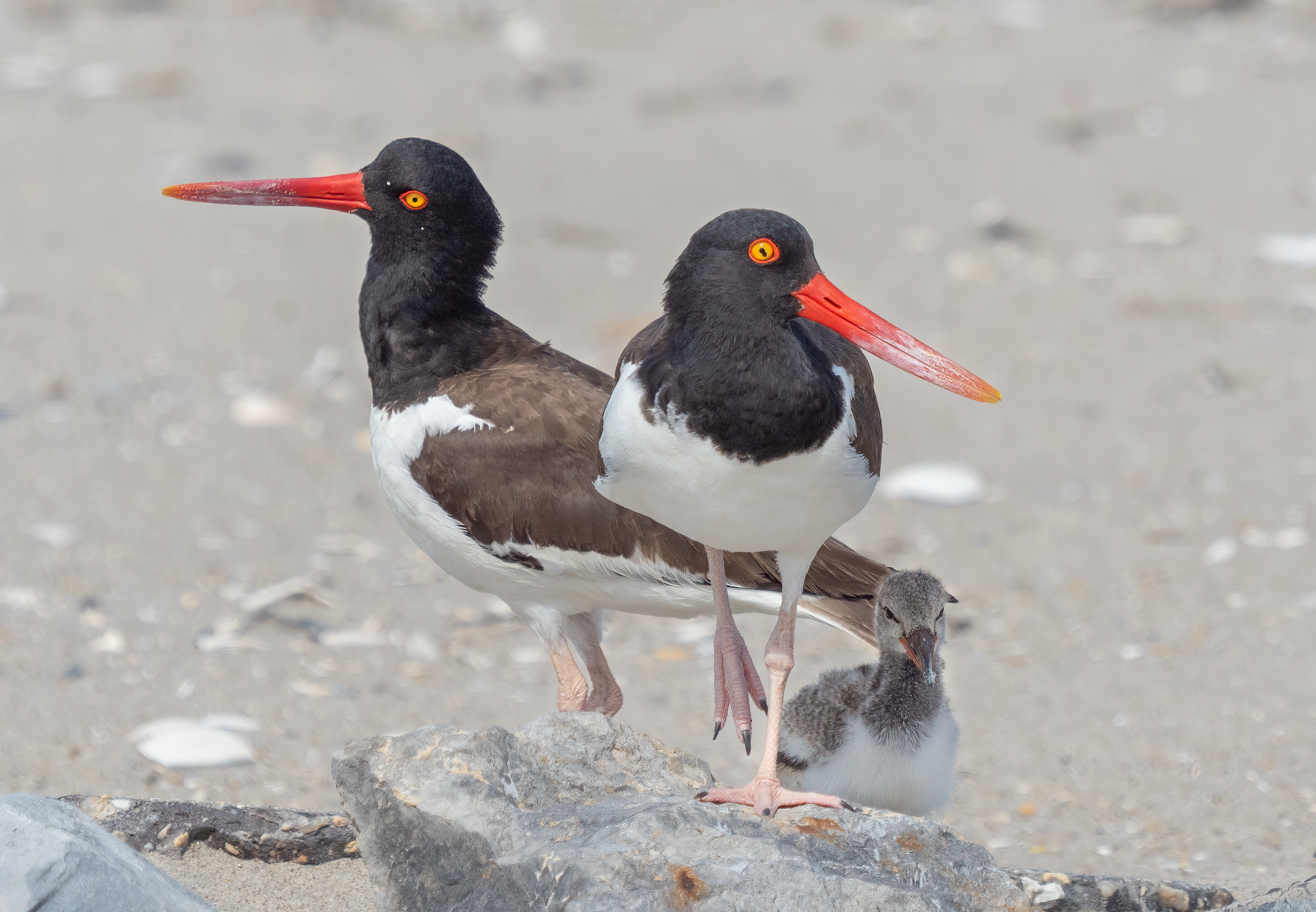
American oystercatcher pair with chick at Fort Tilden, New York

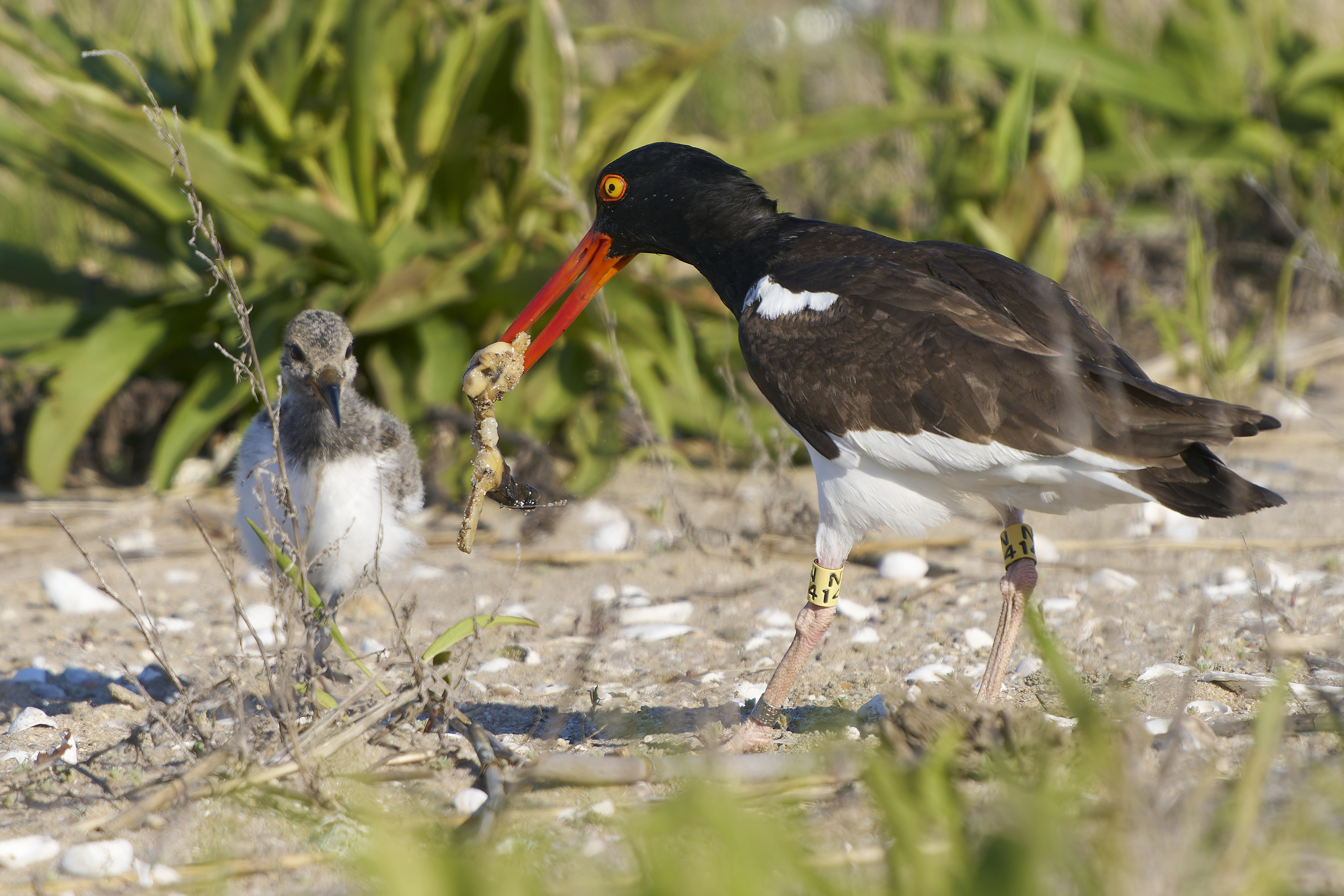
Adult feeding a chick

When born, the chicks are covered in tan down and can run within 2 hours of hatching. They are considered semi-precocial young as they can leave the nest soon after hatching but still rely on their parents for food. Chicks will fledge at about 35 days old After fledging, chicks still rely on their parents for food as it takes up to 60 days for the beak to become strong enough to pry open mollusks. During this time, care of the chicks is evenly divided by the parents.

== Status ==
Historically, the American oystercatcher was hunted to near extinction in the 19th century for plumage and eggs. They have recovered significantly since the passage of the Migratory Bird Treaty Act in 1918. The IUCN lists this species as being of "Least Concern". The reasons given are that the bird has a very wide range and that the total number of individuals is believed to be stable, and actually increasing in the case of the United States. Nevertheless, in some states American oystercatchers are listed as a species of concern because of low and declining populations. The North American population of American oystercatchers was listed on the 2014 State of the Birds Watch List. Although not listed as a federally threatened or endangered species, it is vulnerable to loss of habitat due to development on the coasts and sea level rise. These birds are also threatened by pollution, disease, and invasive species which can impact food availability. In 2018, the American Bird Conservancy estimated the population of American oystercatchers to be 43,000 individuals; the most recent estimate from the IUCN puts the population of mature individuals between 50,000 – 99,999.

== Gallery ==
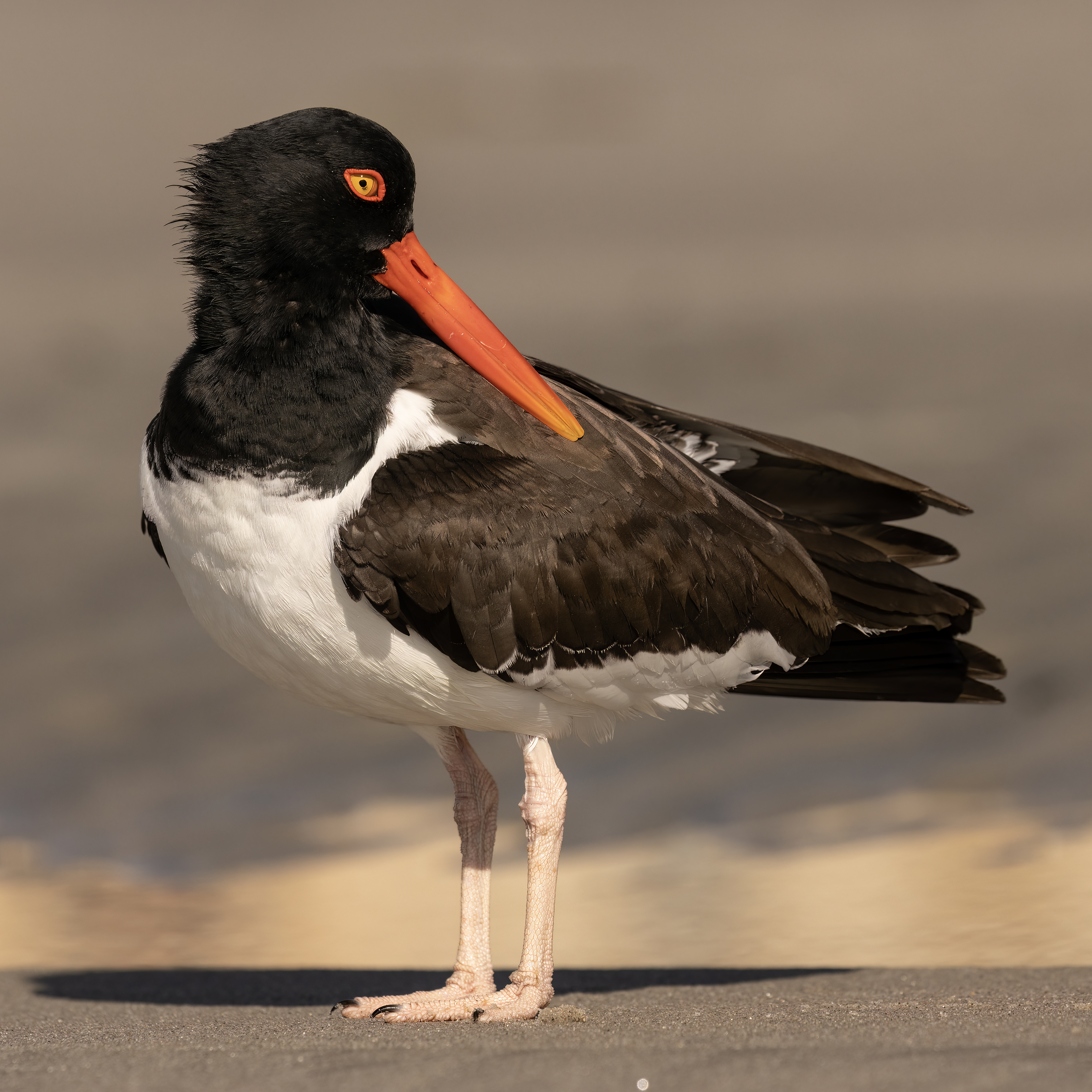
Atlantic City, NJ

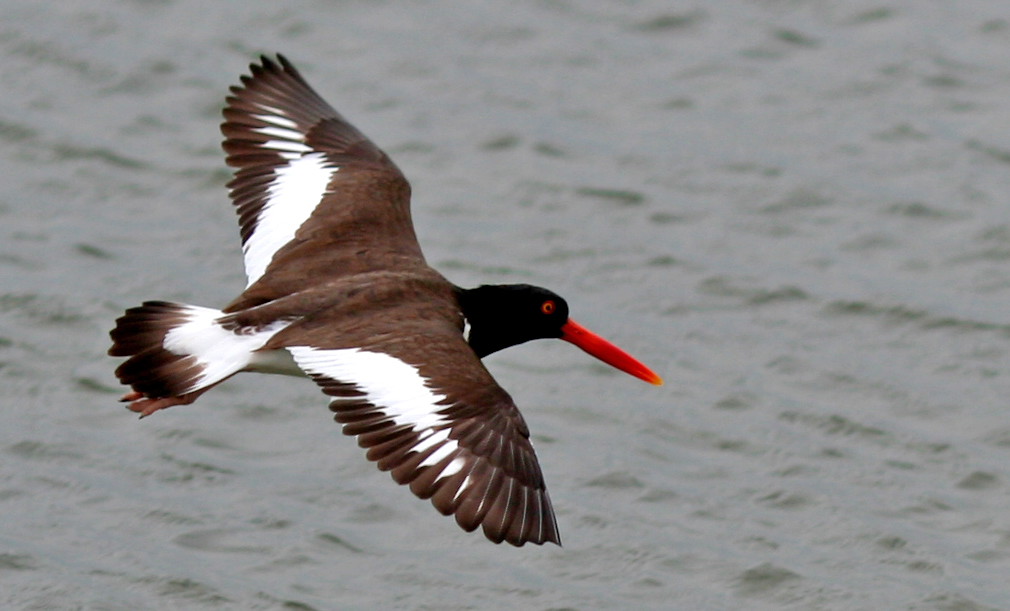
In flight in western Florida

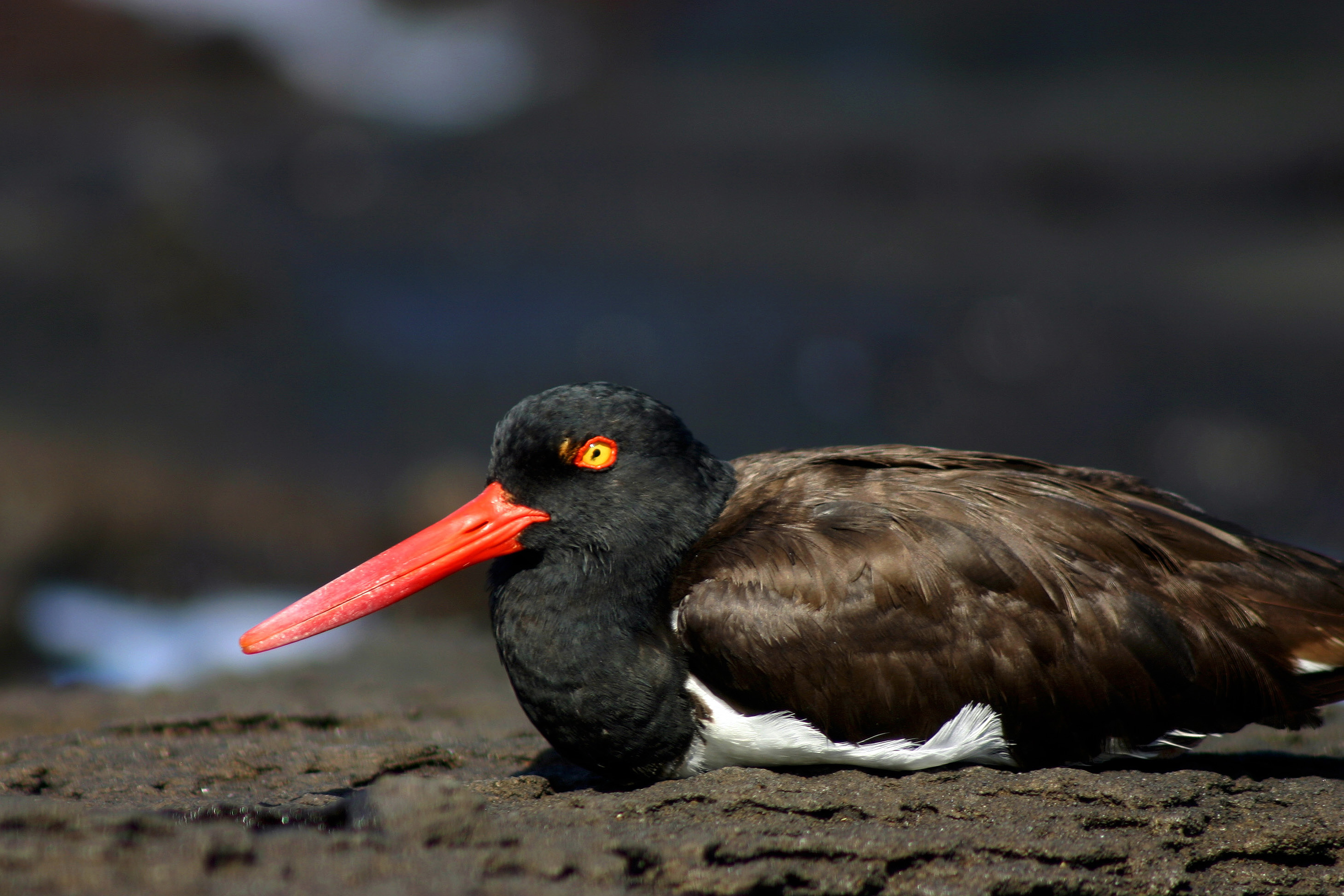
Nesting on Santiago Island, Galápagos Islands

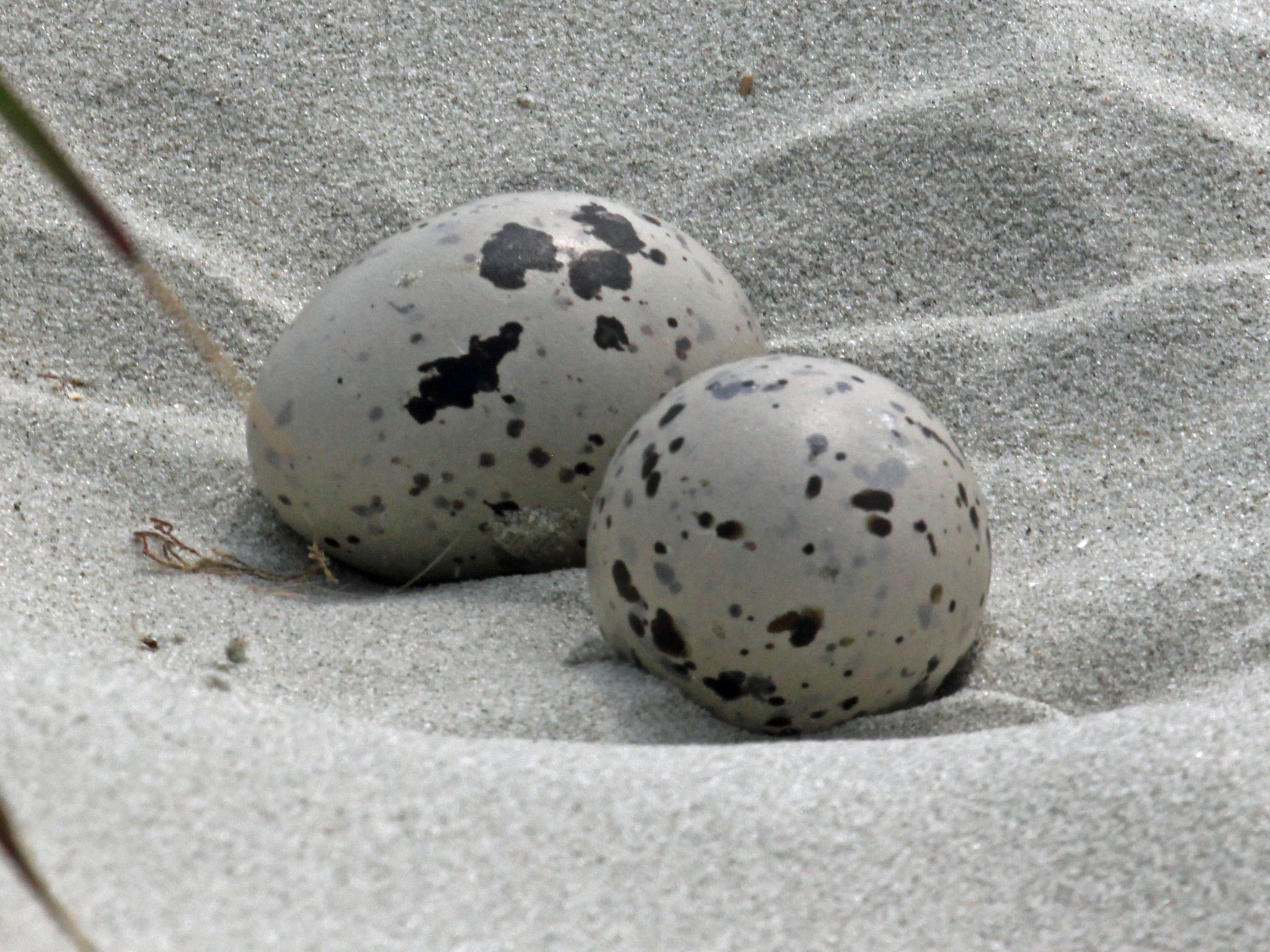
Eggs

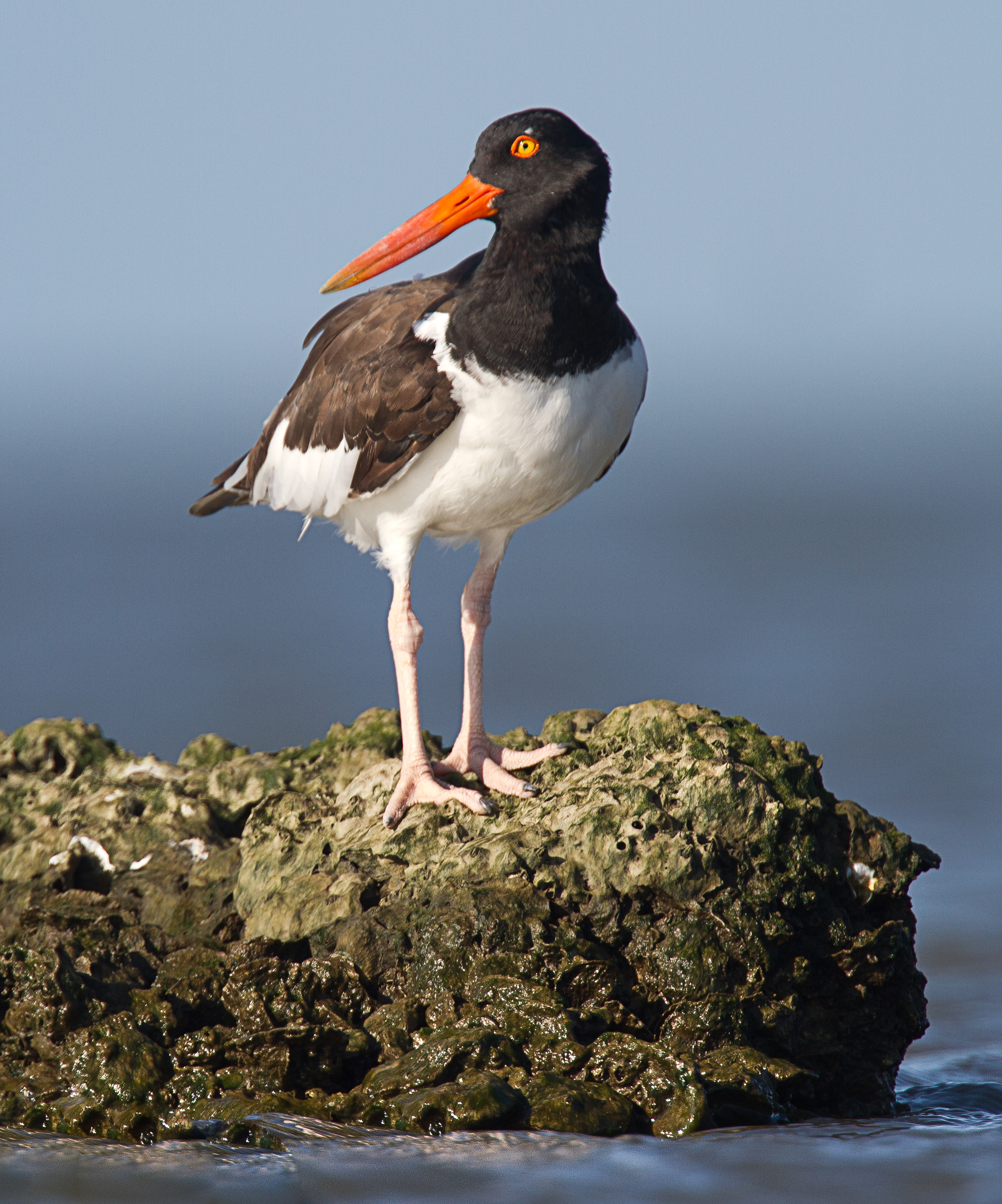
In Texas

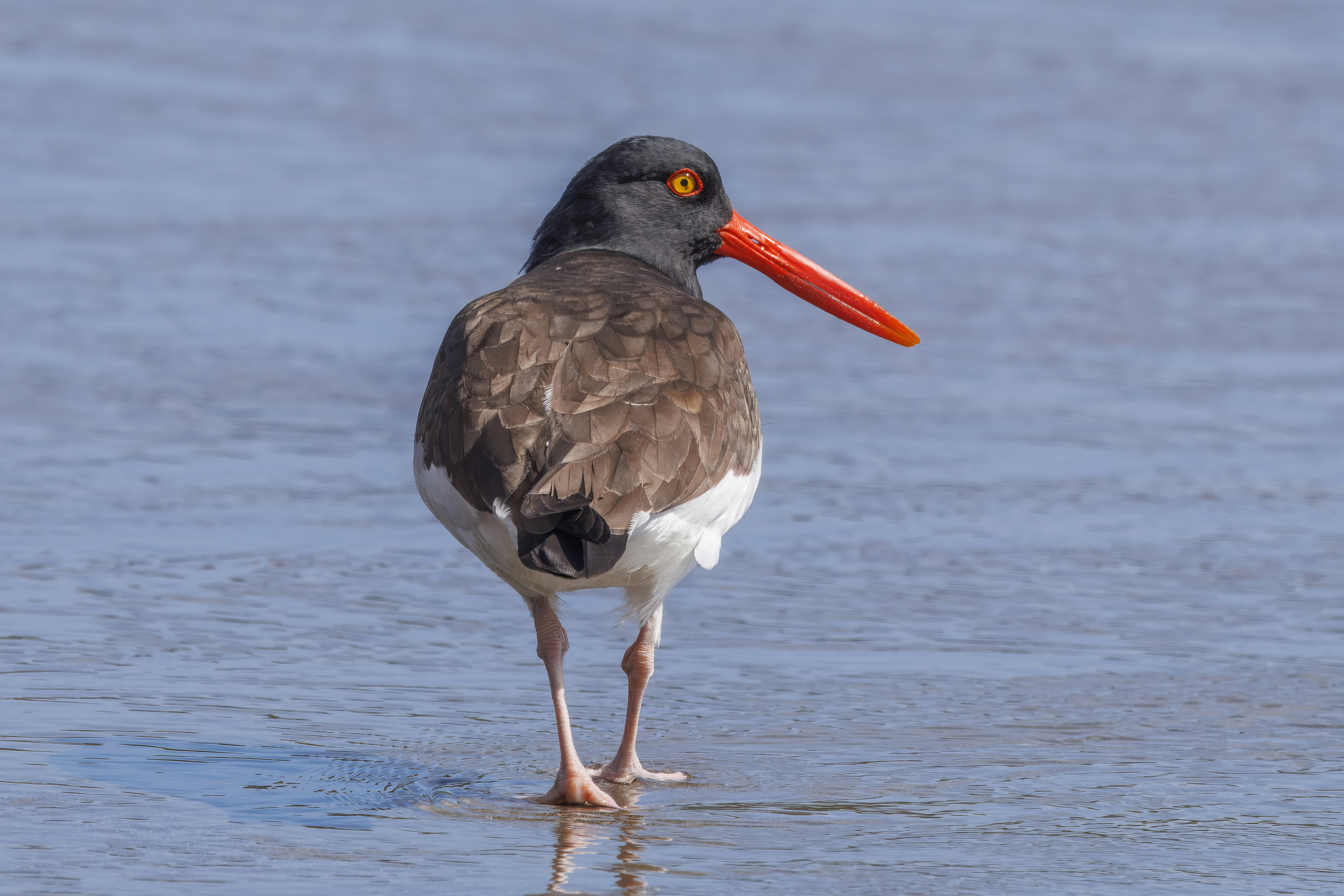
In Chile

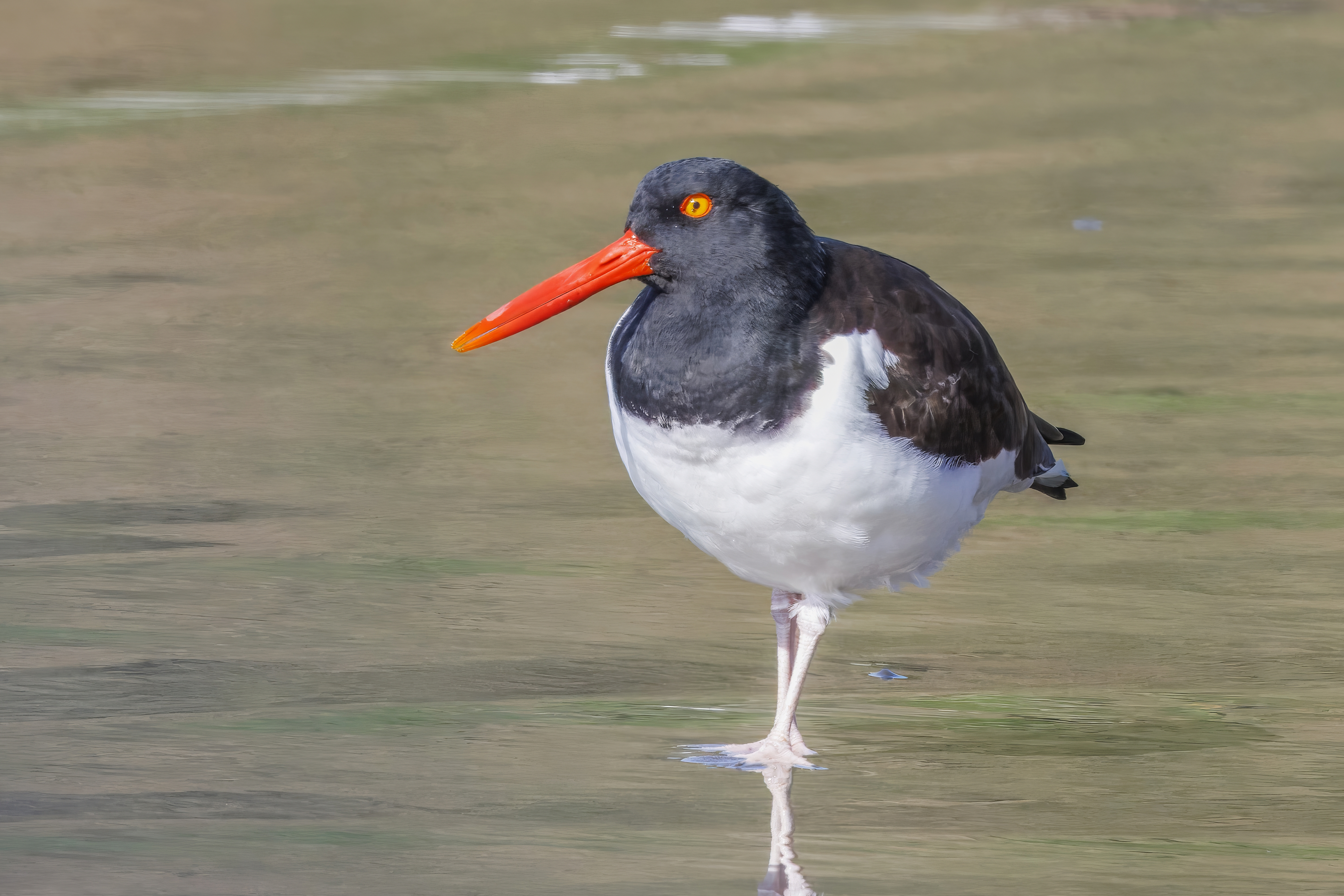
In Chile
