= Ambury Regional Park =

Regional park in Auckland, New Zealand

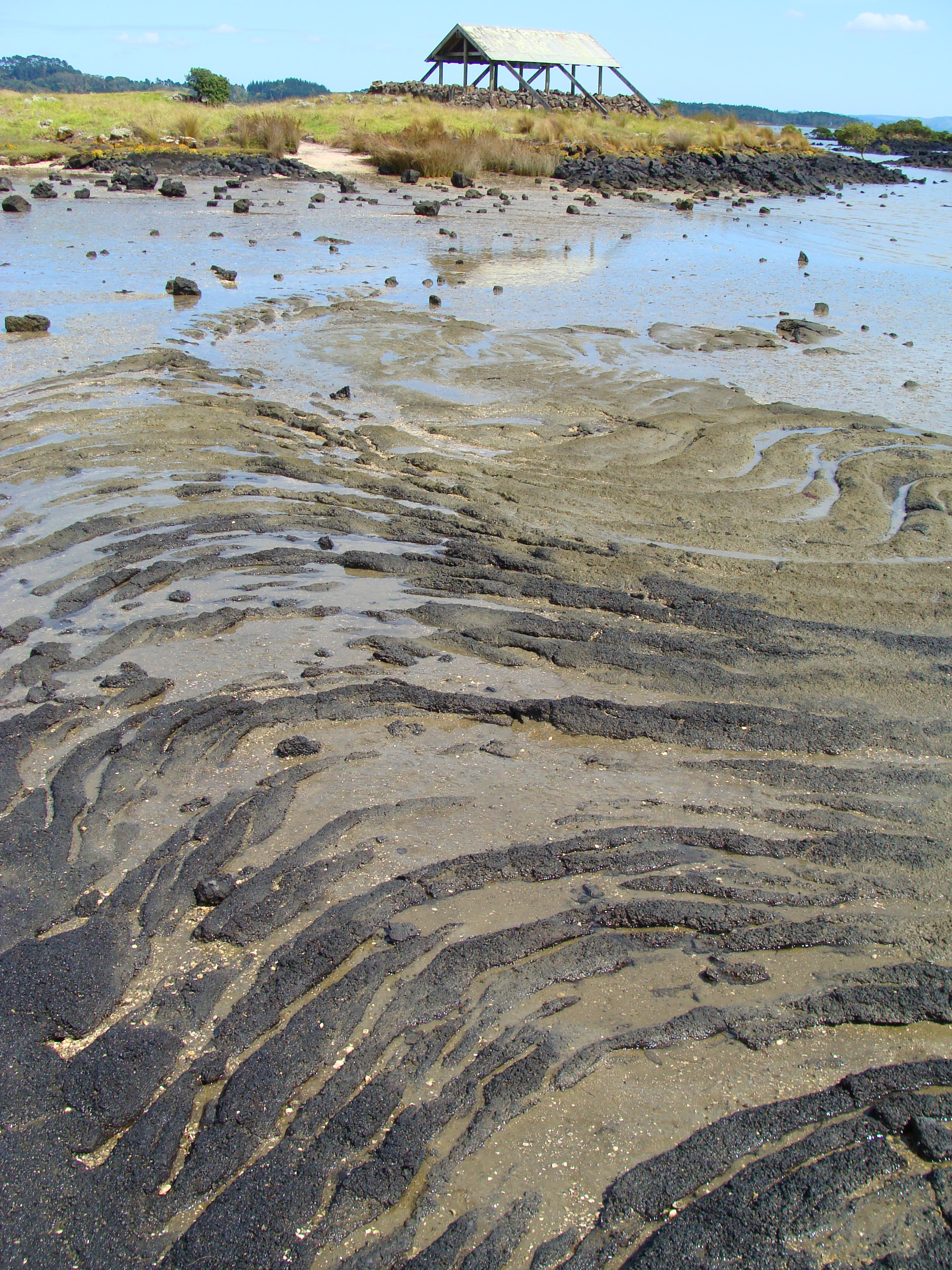
- Lava flow at Ambury Regional Park

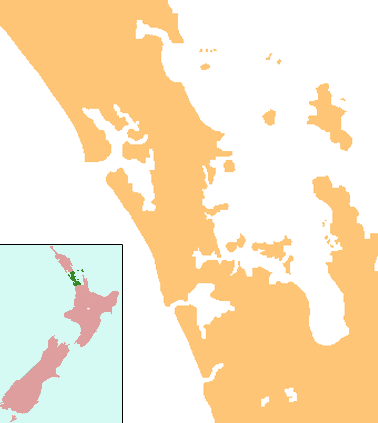
- Location within New Zealand Auckland
- Interactive map of Ambury Regional Park
- Location: New Zealand
- Coordinates: 36.9480023°S 174.7662014°E
- Area: 85 hectares (210 acres)
- Operator: Auckland Council
- Open: Pedestrian access: 24 hours Daylight saving gate hours: 6am-9pm Regular gate hours: 6am-7pm

Ambury Regional Park (also known as Ambury Farm) is a regional park situated on the coast of Manukau Harbour, in Auckland in New Zealand's North Island. It is situated in the suburb of Māngere Bridge and in the local board area of Māngere-Ōtāhuhu, to the west of Māngere Mountain.

The park is a working sheep and dairy farm with a woolshed and milking shed. There are also goats, cows, pigs, chickens, turkey, rabbits and peacocks. Areas of the park are leased to the Mangere Pony Club, and the Ambury Park Centre for Riding Therapy, a charity which opened in 1985, which provides physiological and psychological therapy through horse riding.

The parks hosts the Ambury Farm Day each year. It is the largest annual event organised by Auckland Council, and gives families free access to a working farm.

== Geography ==
The park covers 85 hectares (210 acres) of low-lying volcanic land on the shores of the upper Manukau Harbour. It includes both camping coastline, grazed farming paddocks, wetlands, saltmarshes and small areas of native forest.

Much of Ambury Regional Park formed approximately 50,000 years ago, during an eruption of Māngere Mountain. There are several examples of basalt lava flows, originating from the Māngere Mountain about 18,000 years ago. Most other lava flows around Auckland have been destroyed during urban development.

== Biodiversity ==
Large numbers of migratory shorebirds visit Ambury Regional Park and the surrounding areas of the Manukau Harbour, with an estimated number of 28,000 tōrea and 1,200 ngutuparore (wrybills) migrating north from the South Island after breeding over the winter. During summer months, an estimated 12,000 kuaka (bar-tailed godwits) and 9,000 huahou (red knots) spend summer months in the vicinity of the park. Kōtuku ngutupapa (royal spoonbill) also migrate to the area. Birdwatchers have identified a total of 86 birds in the park including little shags, and white-faced herons.

In 2015, a vegetation survey identified 40 native species in Ambury Regional Park, including the nationally vulnerable species Geranium retrorsum, and oioi-coastal needle grass, only rarely seen in saline volcanic soil in the Auckland Region.

== History ==
There is an extensive history of Māori settlement in the Māngere Mountain area, and there are 95 archaeological sites around the park. During the mid-19th century, the area was converted to farmland. In 1882, the Ambury English & Co milk company established a creamery on a 260 acres (110 ha) farm on Wallace Road.

In the late 1960s, the Māngere sewage treatment was established on the shores of the Manukau Harbour. Over 500 hectares (1,200 acres) of oxidation ponds were decommissioned, 13 kilometres (8.1 mi) of shoreline were restored, beaches were constructed, and 27,000 trees were planted in New Zealand's largest coastal restoration project, which was officially completed in 2005. During the 1960s, the Auckland Regional Authority purchased land adjacent to the Māngere sewage treatment plant as a buffer. From une 1973, local community groups were able to user the land, and in 1977 an educational farm was established at the site. Ambury Regional Park was officially opened on 26 September 1987.

In 1985, a fuel pipeline between Marsden Point and Auckland Airport was laid through the park. The route is marked by white fenceposts, farm gate tags and triangular marine markers.

In December 1986, the Ambury Regional Park was the site of a large-scale Mongrel Mob convention, where over 300 members attended, during which gang members helped complete the rock retaining walls along the Manukau waterfront. A kidnapping and sexual assault at this event became national news.

The annual Ambury Farm Day began in 1988. By 2009, 35,000 people attended the event. By the early 2000s, the park had become a popular school excursion, with 3-4 schools booked per week visiting the working farm.

A new concept plan for the park was developed in 2009, which included linking it up to nearby walk and cycling tracks. By that stage, 25,000 people were visiting the park each year outside of the annual farm day. By the late 2010s, around 400,000 people had begun visiting the park annually.

== Recreation ==
There are a range of facilities, including public toilets and barbecues. The campground can accommodate up to 60 people.

== Transport ==
The park is connected by walkway and cycleway to the Māngere Bridge to Onehunga in the north-east along Kiwi Esplanade, and the Ihumātao to the south. It is within walking distance to the nearest bus stop, and the nearest train station is Onehunga railway station.

== Gallery ==
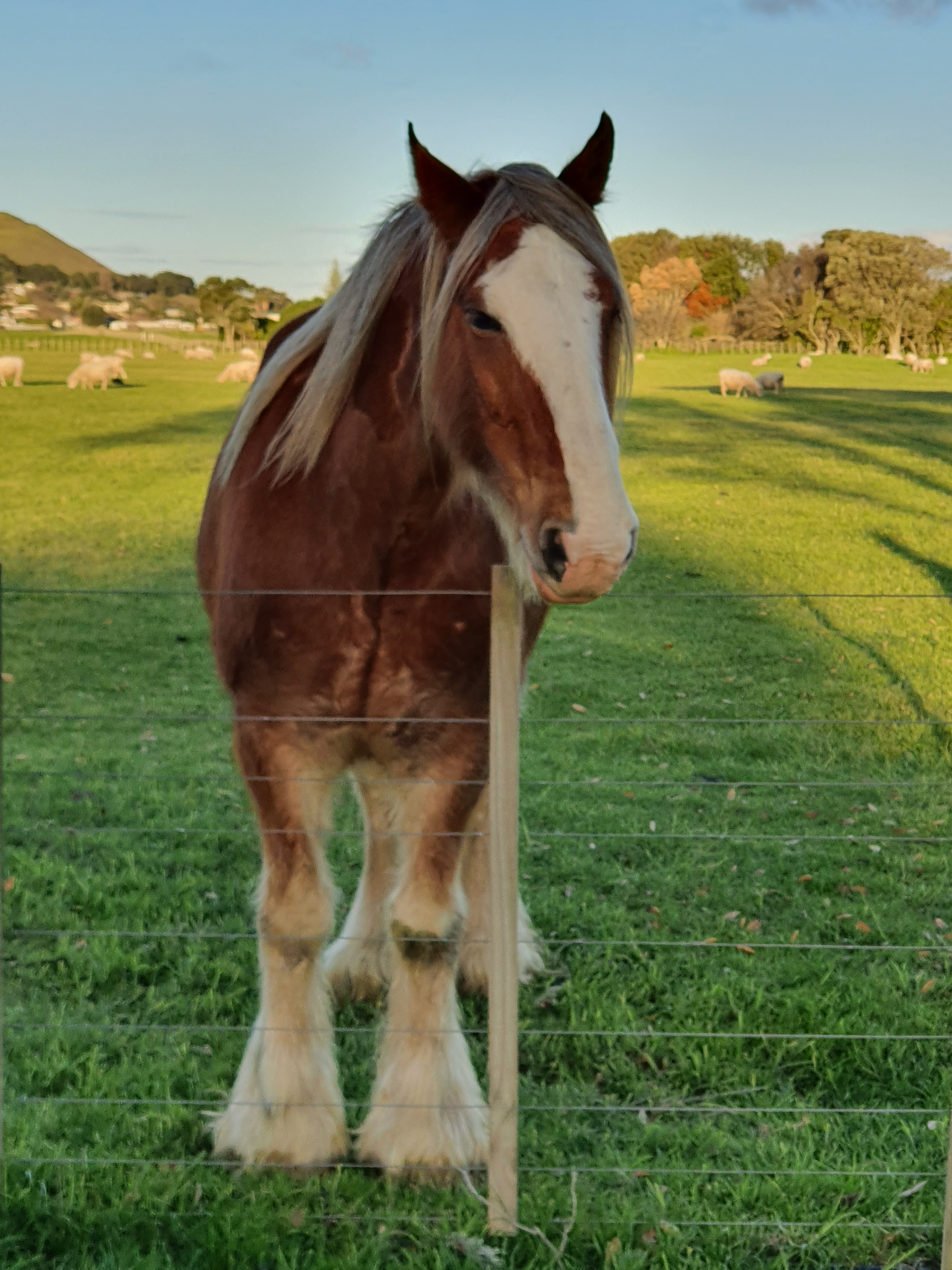
A clydesdale horse at Ambury Regional Park.

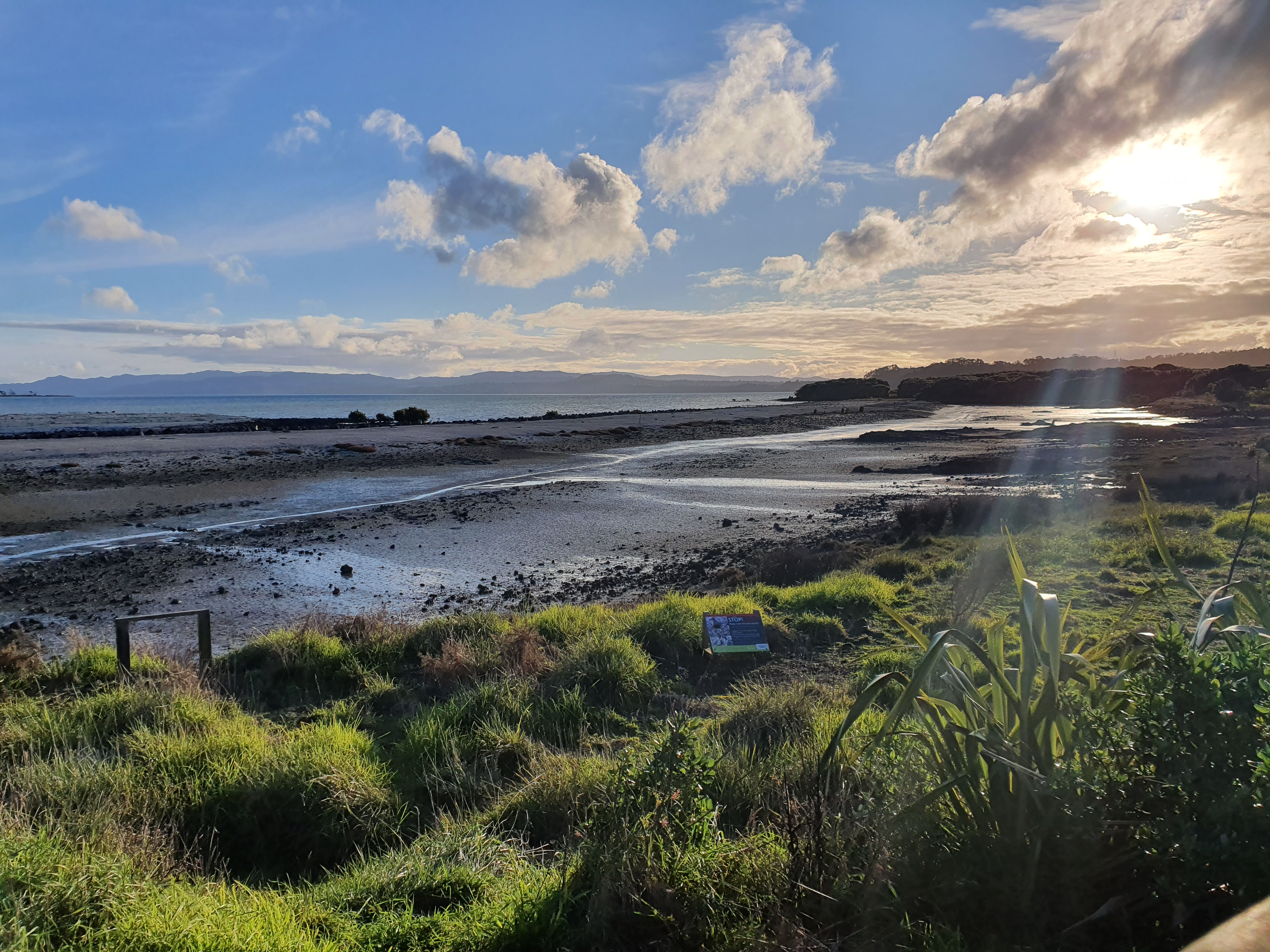
Nesting area for birds at the park.

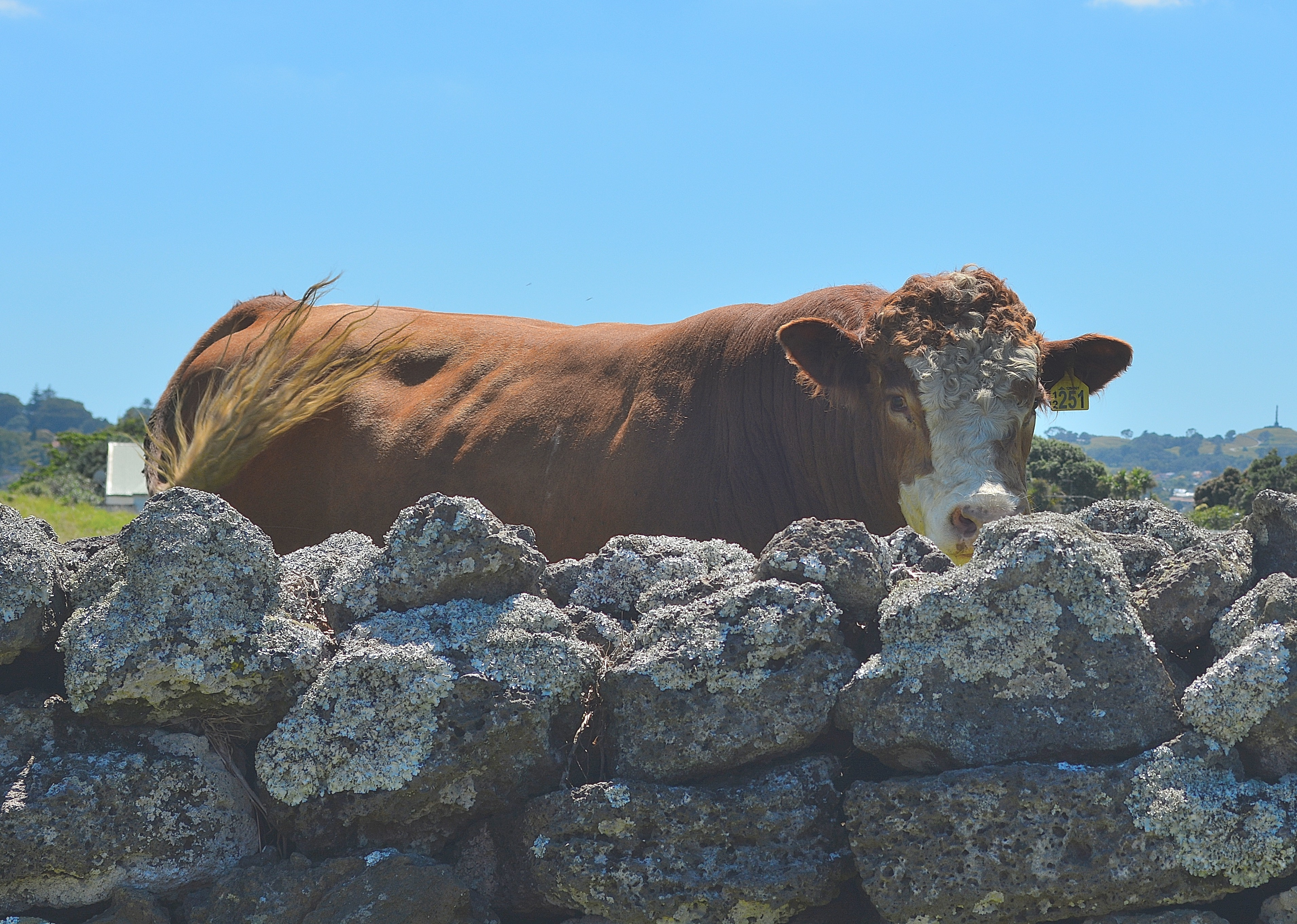
A bull hidden behind a drystone wall at the park.

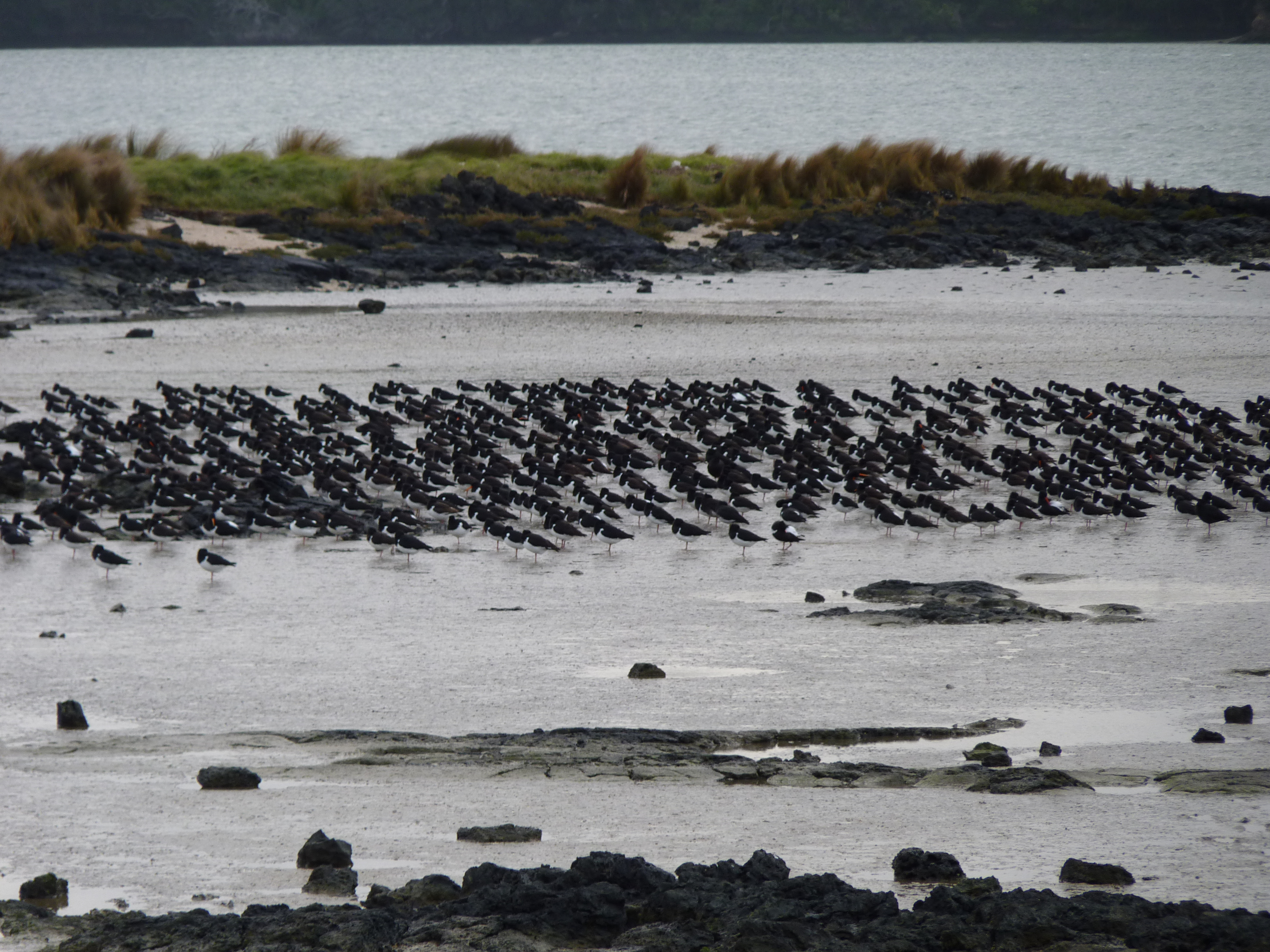
South Island oystercatchers at Ambury Regional Park.
