= Kiwi Esplanade =

Street in Māngere Bridge, Auckland, New Zealand

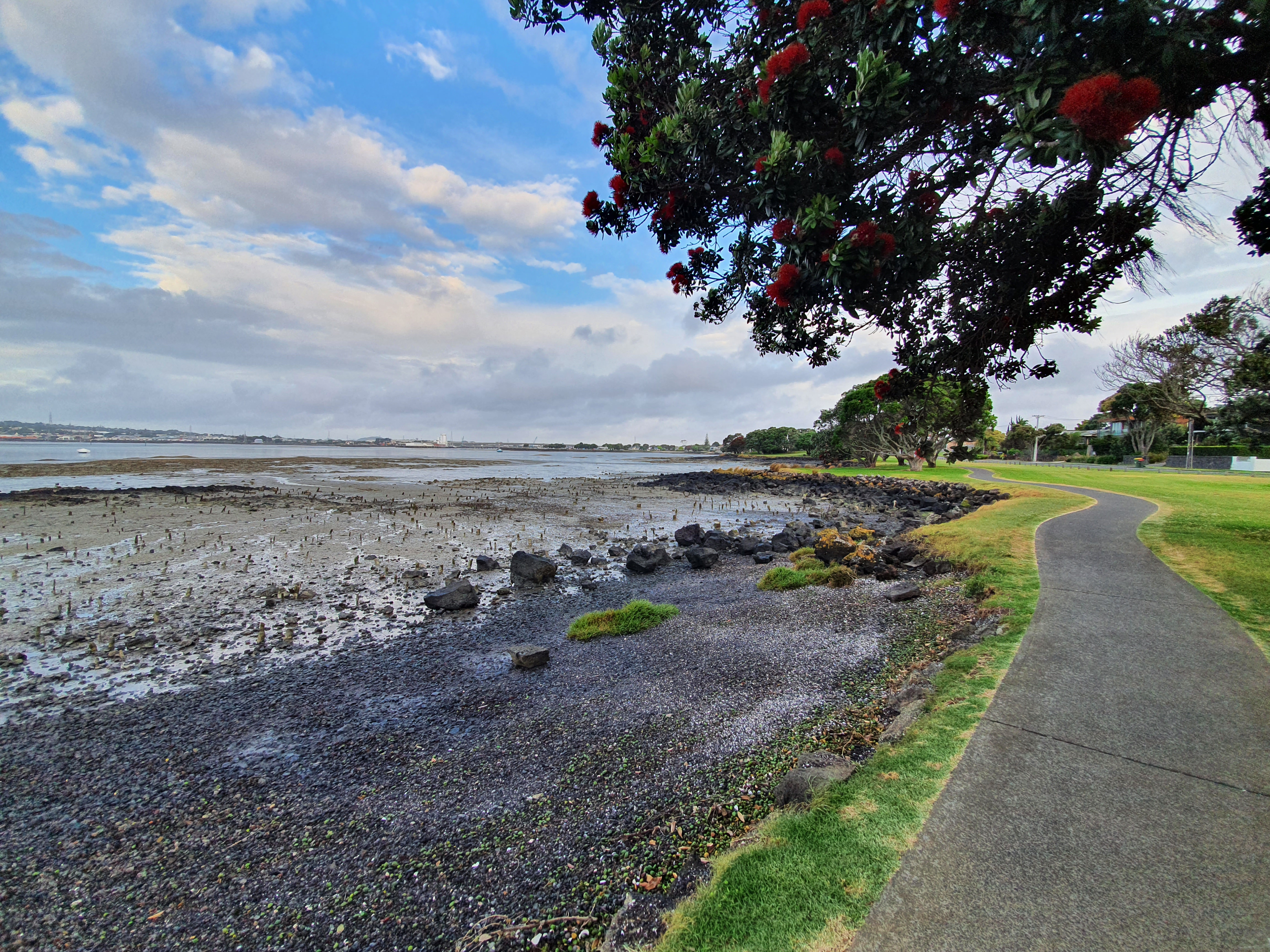
- Kiwi Esplanade Walkway
- Length: 2.5 km (1.6 mi)
- Location: Māngere Bridge
- Postal code: 2022
- Coordinates: 36.94034°S 174.77293°E
- West end: Ambury Regional Park
- East end: Coronation Road

Kiwi Esplanade is a coastal street in Māngere Bridge, Auckland, New Zealand, following the shore of the Manukau Harbour. A public walkway connects Ngā Hau Māngere Bridge in the east to Ambury Regional Park in the west. The shoreline is notable for the visible pāhoehoe lava flows, which originated from Māngere Mountain.

== Geography ==
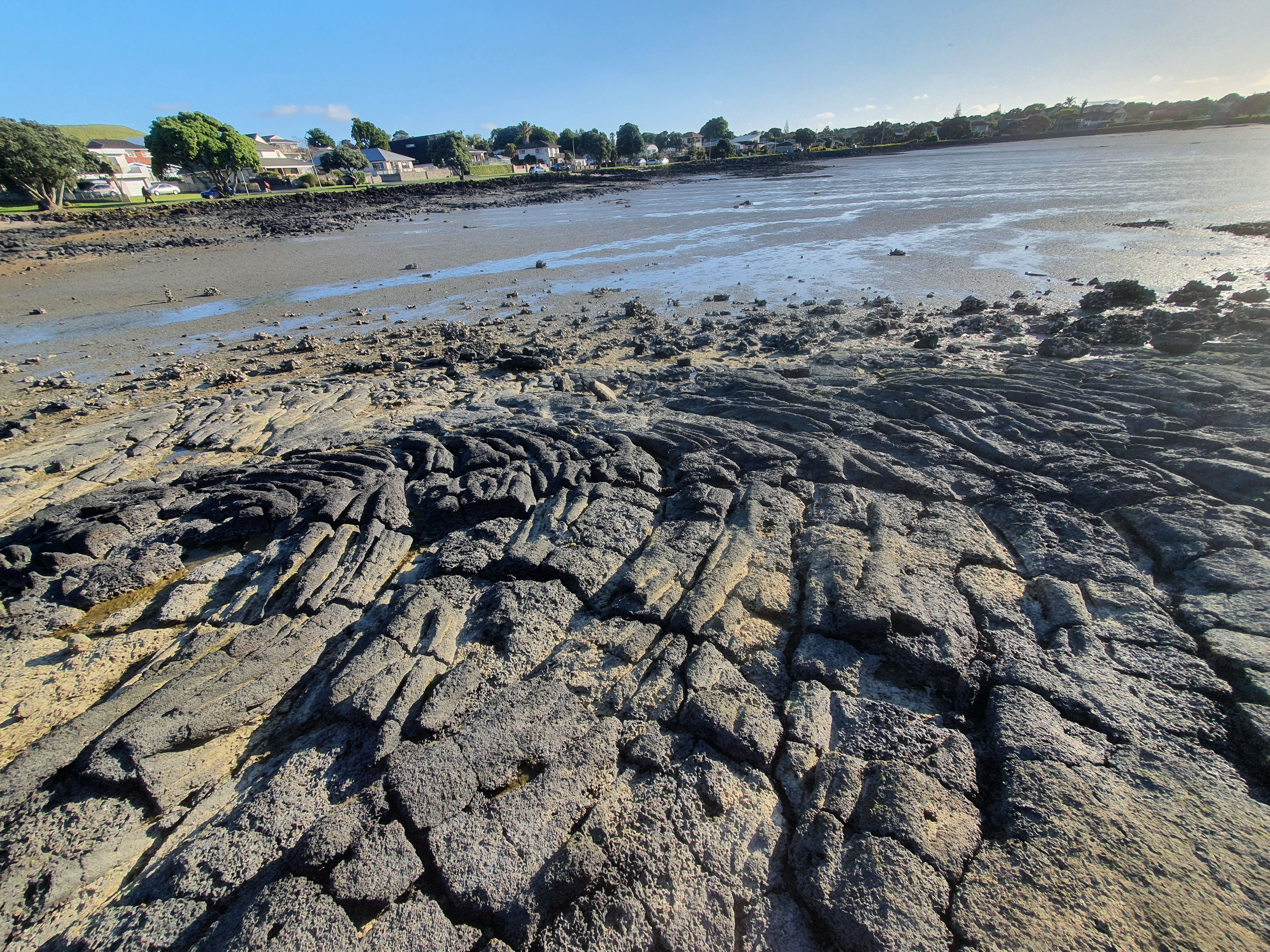
Ropey pāhoehoe lava along the shoreline of Kiwi Esplanade

Kiwi Esplanade follows the coast of the Manukau Harbour. It is the best example of pāhoehoe lava flows found in New Zealand, which were created by an eruption from an eruption by Māngere Mountain approximately 50,000 years ago. These were protected from erosion by a thick layer of volcanic ash, and were exposed relatively recently due to erosion by the sea. Additionally, ʻaʻā lava flows can be found along the esplanade.

The shoreline has a mix of rocks, reefs and mudflats.

== Biodiversity ==
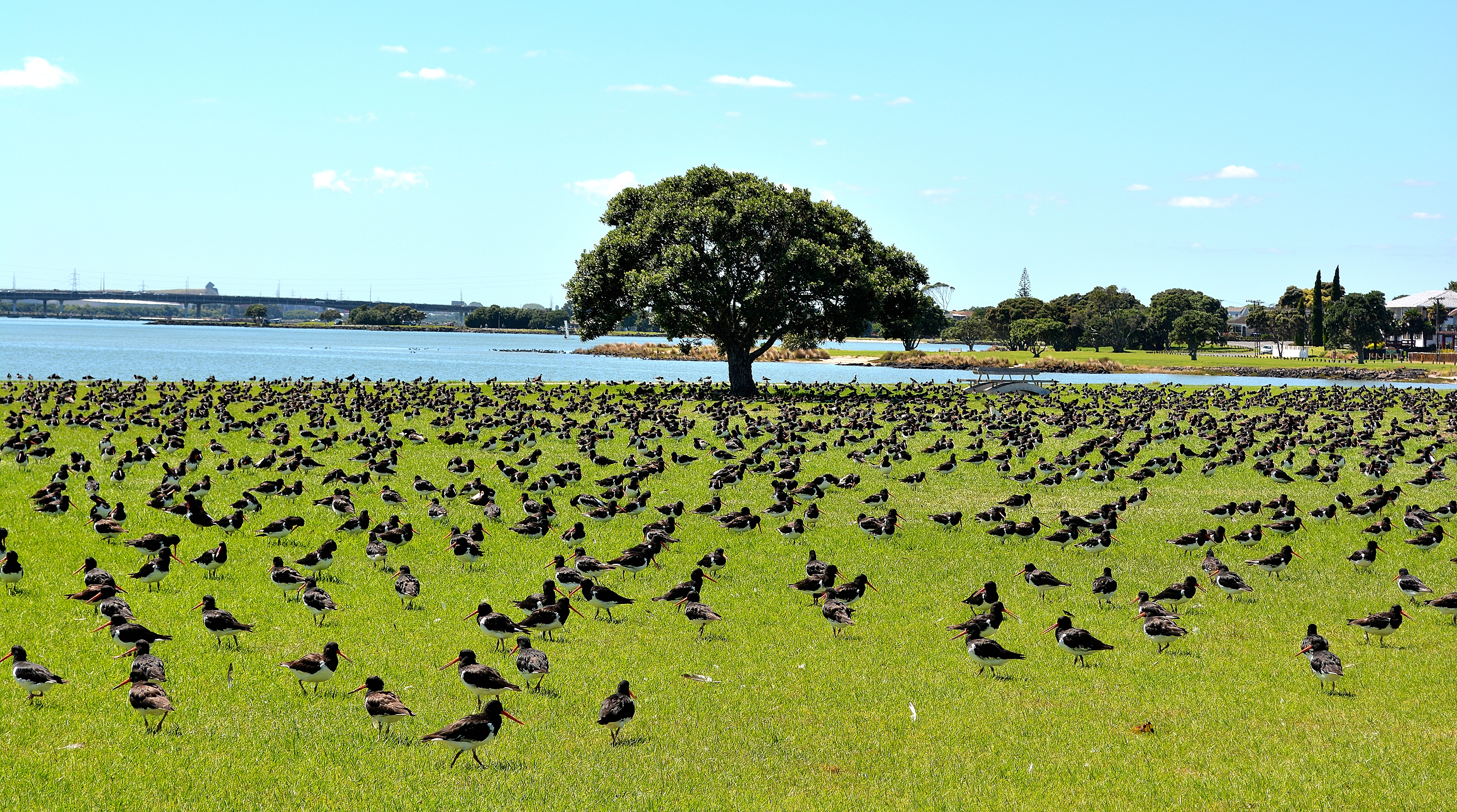
South Island oystercatchers at Kiwi Esplanade

The Kiwi Esplanade shore was selected as an Area of Significant Conservation Value (ASCV), due to the pāhoehoe lava flows and it being a significant area for native bird species, such as the South Island oystercatcher. The annelid Heteromastus filiformis is one of the most common benthic species, and the shore is home to many species including Austrovenus stutchburyi (New Zealand cockle).

== History ==
The shores of the Manukau Harbour have been inhabited by Tāmaki Māori since at least the 14th Century. The first archaeological sites along Kiwi Esplanade date to the 15th Century. While there are relatively few archaeological sites along the shoreline compared to Ambury Regional Park in the southwest, this is most likely to due sites being destroyed, and not a lack of use. Archaeological middens along Kiwi Esplanade show that Austrovenus stutchburyi (tuangi / cockles) were primarily what were eaten from the shore. The area to the west of Kiwi Esplanade, near the Manukau Yacht & Motor Boat Club, may have been a launching point for waka.

The first shop in Māngere Bridge opened at the corner of Kiwi Esplanade and Coronation Road in the early 1880s. The eastern section of the walk was first designated as a recreational reserve in 1912.

The road was developed during the Great Depression in the 1930s, although the first references to Kiwi Esplanade come from 1928. The name may have been a nickname of a local resident, Mrs Kewene. The Manukau County Council erected bathing sheds along Kiwi Esplanade in 1938. Kiwi Esplanade was the subject of a Robert Sullivan poem written in 1987.

In 2005 as a part of the removal of the oxidation ponds along the Māngere shoreline, a coastal walkway was constructed along Kiwi Esplanade. The walkway runs through Ambury Regional Park and Ōtuataua Stonefields, and forms a section of the Te Araroa Trail, a walking trail between the most northern and southern parts of New Zealand.

== Features ==
- Ngā Hau Māngere Bridge, a walking bridge that connects Māngere Bridge to Onehunga in the north. The location was originally a basalt rock crossing used by Tāmaki Māori people, and the first and second bridges, constructed in 1875 and 1915 respectively. The Ambury to Waikaraka Path follows Kiwi Esplanade, and after crossing the Manukau Harbour at Ngā Hau Māngere Bridge, continues along the northern shore of the Māngere Inlet, joining with the Waikaraka Cycleway.
- Allan Park, the former site of the Oriental Rendezvous cabaret club, which operated from 1923 until it burnt down in 1940.
- The Mangere Boating Club, established in November 1961. A public playground is found adjacent to the boating club.
- Manukau Yacht & Motor Boat Club. Originally opening in Onehunga, the club moved to its current location in May 1979.
