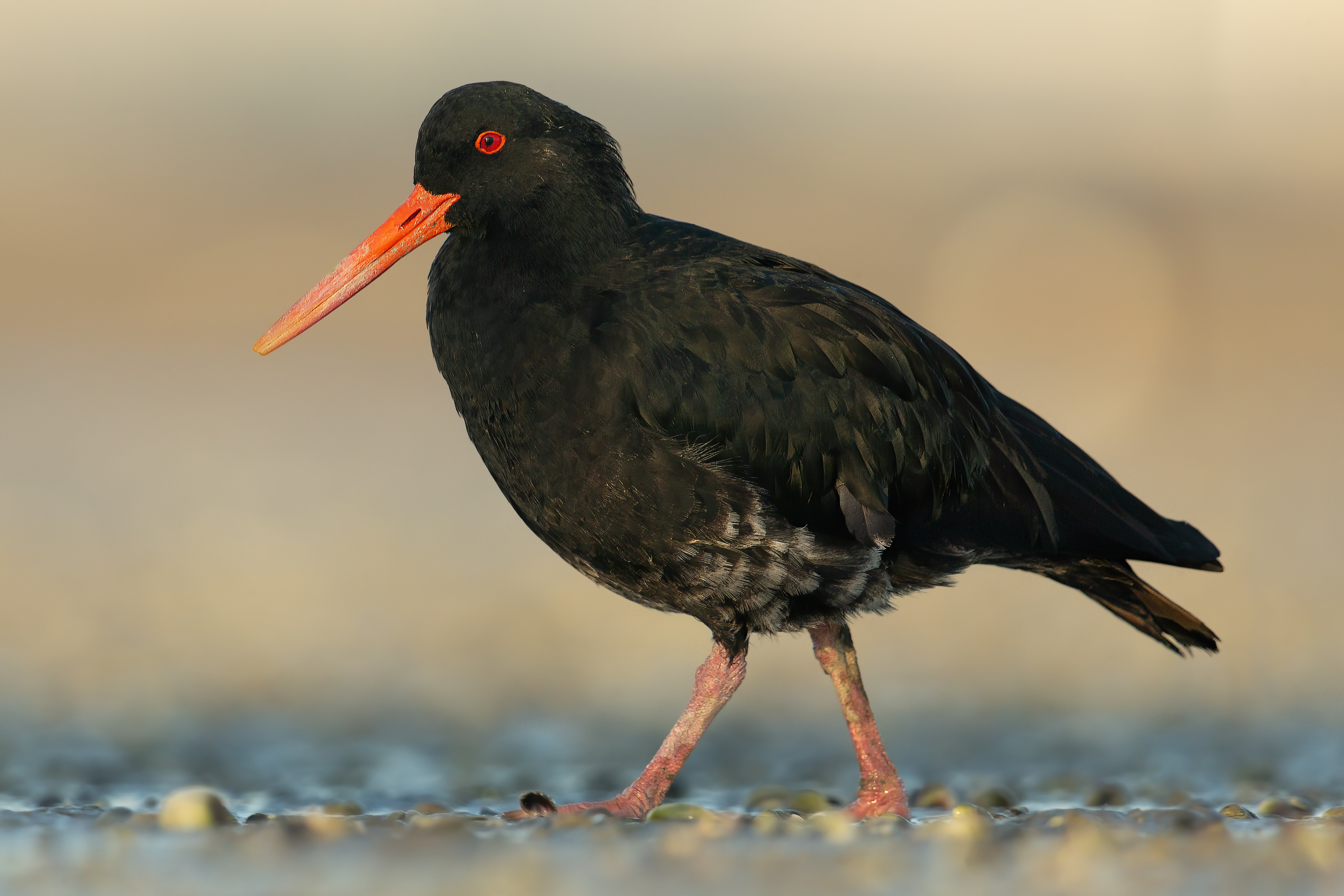
- Mottled variant
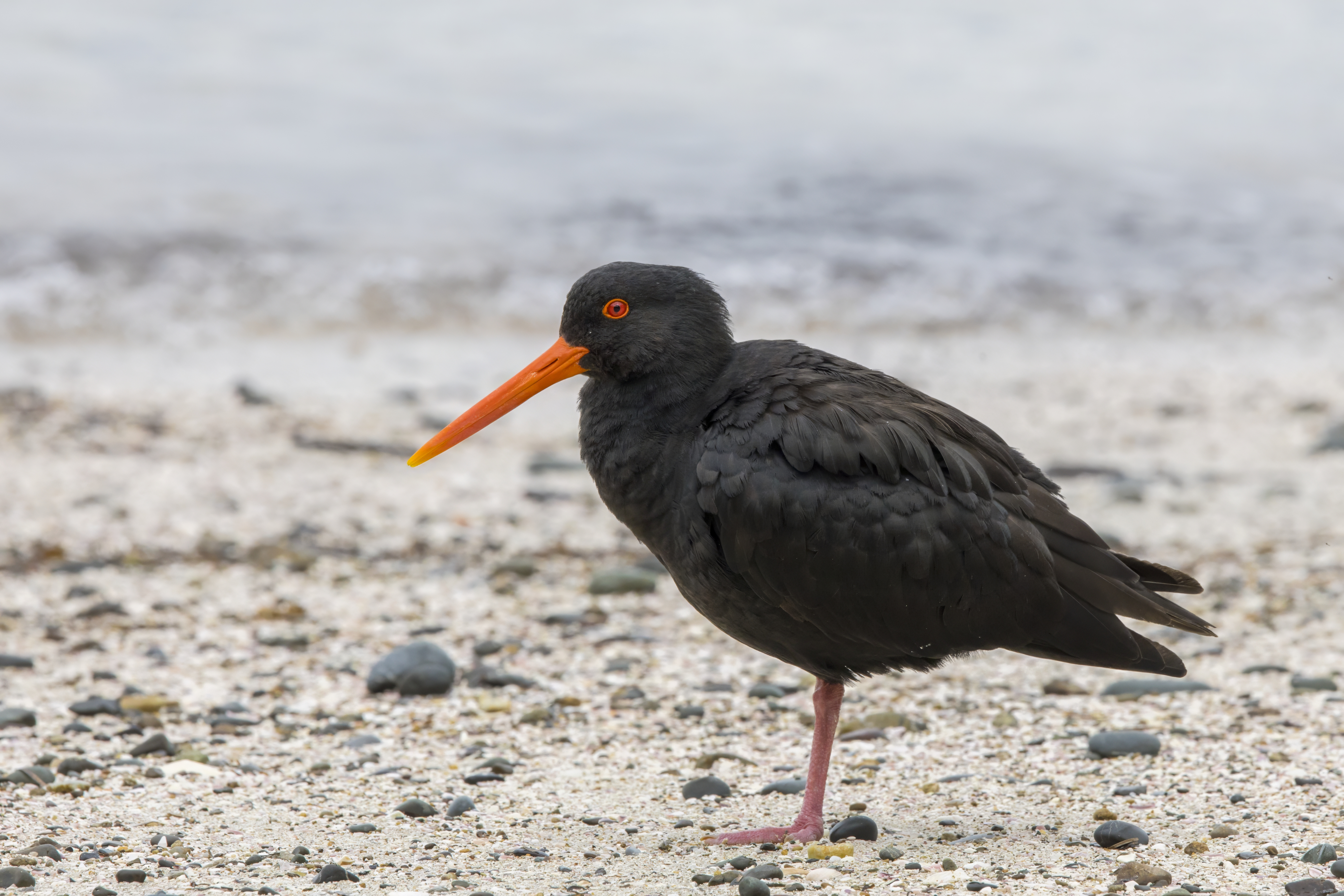
- Black variant

Conservation status
- Least Concern (IUCN 3.1)

Scientific classification
- Kingdom: Animalia
- Phylum: Chordata
- Class: Aves
- Order: Charadriiformes
- Family: Haematopodidae
- Genus: Haematopus
- Species: H. unicolor

Binomial name
- Haematopus unicolor Forster, 1844

= Variable oystercatcher =

Species of bird

The variable oystercatcher (Haematopus unicolor) is a species of wader in the family Haematopodidae. It is endemic to New Zealand. The Māori name is tōrea-pango. They are also known as 'red bills'.

== Description ==
"Variable" refers to the frontal plumage, which ranges from pied through mottled to all black. They are polymorphic meaning they have different genetic variants. These color differences are attributed to the latitude of the habitat, where the northernmost oystercatchers have significantly more white on their bodies than those of southern origin. All Stewart Island variable oystercatchers are black. They have pink legs, an orange eye ring and orange-red beaks. Similar to a needle in shape, the bill is thin and long, and darkens to a deep red color during the breeding season. Males are around 678 grams and females slightly larger at around 724 grams. Length of individuals range from 42 to 47 cm from beak to tail and have a short, sturdy body with a thick neck.

Variables can be identified as they are slightly larger than the South Island pied oystercatcher (SIPO are around 550 grams). Occasionally completely black, but if they are pied (black and white) they can be easily confused with SIPO. The variable species has less definition between the black and the white area, as well as a mottled band on the leading edges of the underwing. Variables also have a smaller white rump patch which is only a band across the base of the tail rather than a wide wedge shape reaching up to the middle of the back as in the SIPO. When mottled they are sometimes called "smudgies". While both sexes have the same plumage colorations and appear visually similar, there is some body dimorphism and female oystercatchers tend to be slightly larger in size.

== Distribution and habitat ==
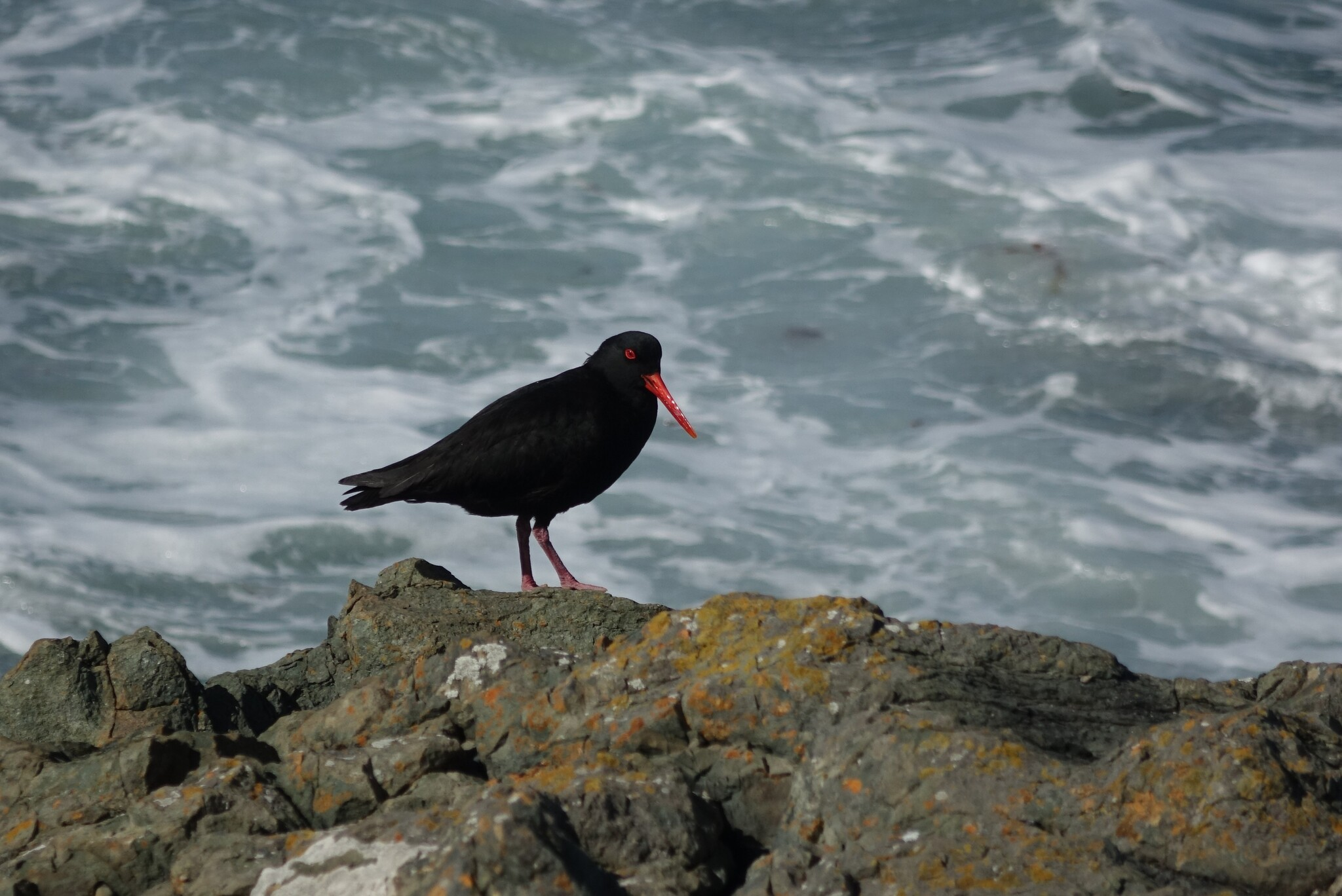
Haematopus unicolor in its natural habitat

Haematopus unicolor is endemic to New Zealand. The species has likely remained endemic due to its sedentary lifestyle and lack of migration, keeping all populations within the same island habitat. They are often seen in pairs on the coast all around New Zealand. Their distribution around New Zealand is around most of the North, South and Stewart Islands coastlines and some offshore islands with the exception of outlying islands off the west coast. While they occur in lower densities on the western coastlines they are concentrated in these areas; Northland, Coromandel Peninsula, Bay of Plenty, Greater Wellington, Nelson/Marlborough and Fiordland.

Their preferred habitat is a wide range of coastal habitat types varying depending on activity and habitat available. Haematopus unicolor is generally never found more than 30 km from the coast. Breeding and nesting occurs on sandy coasts, usually far from muddy harbours. Individuals have been known to congregate in short grassed paddocks and sometimes forage in pastures after rain however will generally remain around the coastal beaches, estuaries and shorelines. They prefer sandy coastal areas and avoid gravel beaches and boulder strewn areas. They nest on the shore between rocks or on sand dunes by making a scrape out of the sand or shingle, sometimes lined with some seaweed.

== Behaviour ==
=== Voice ===
When in flight they make a high pitched 'kleep kleep' sound.

=== Feeding ===
Feeding behaviour is diurnal and nocturnal with no feeding occurring two hours either side of high tide. The birds will then start feeding as the tide ebbs. Food is located mainly by visual location but when it is dark or the food is obscured by the substrate, they will locate food via random probing with the bill. Their diet consists of a range of molluscs, crustaceans, worms, small invertebrates and sometimes small fish. The molluscs are mainly bivalves and are opened by the birds by using the bill to stab and twist them open. Some birds have been observed to hammer them open. After heavy rain, they sometimes go inland in search of earthworms.

=== Breeding ===
As a sedentary species, the oystercatchers do not travel to a specific location to mate. Instead, they breed on the coastal sand dunes where they live nearly year-round. After finding a potential mate, the male oystercatcher will give a territorial display to both impress the female and scare off other males. This display includes several 'bowing' or 'ducking' movements, where the bird tilts and dips its head while making piping calls. These movements are also used to distinguish territory space outside of the mating season, when the adult birds prefer living in solitary environments. After a female has decided to breed with a male, the pair remains monogamous during the rest of the mating season and potentially for several consecutive years thereafter. During breeding, the pair will defend their territory, sometimes aggressively.

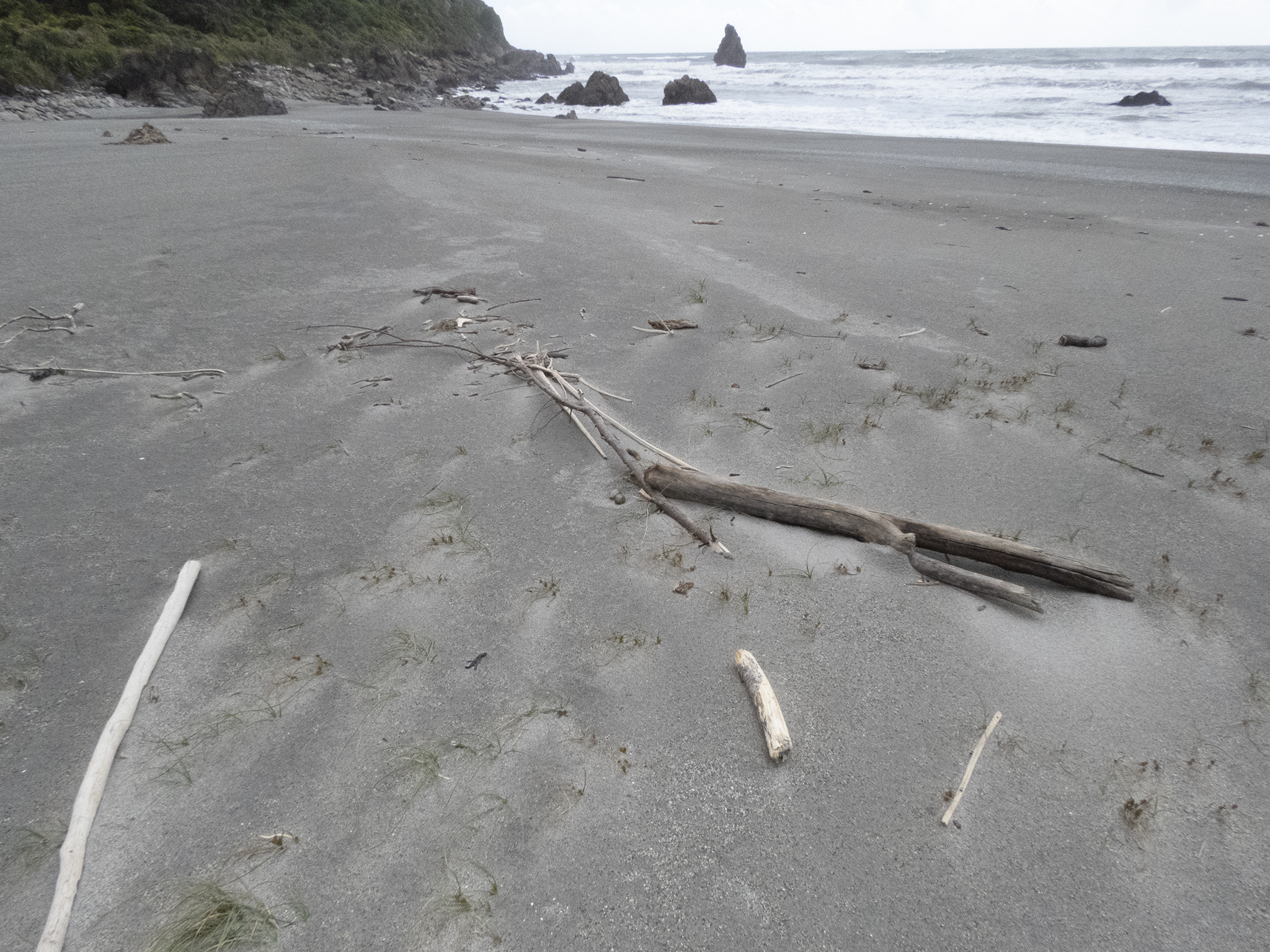
Nest from afar

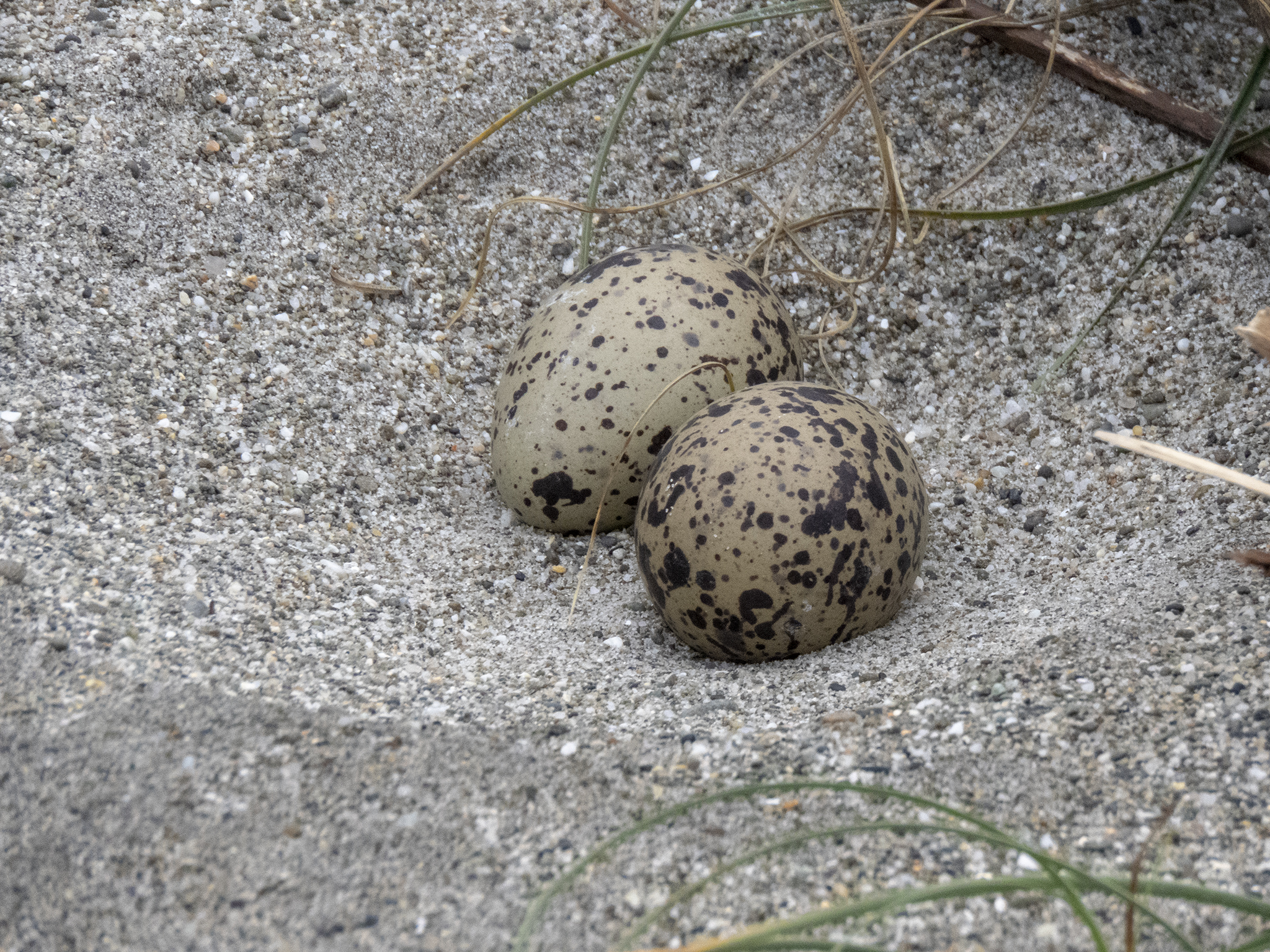
Nest closeup

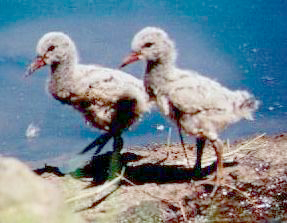
Black variant oystercatcher chicks

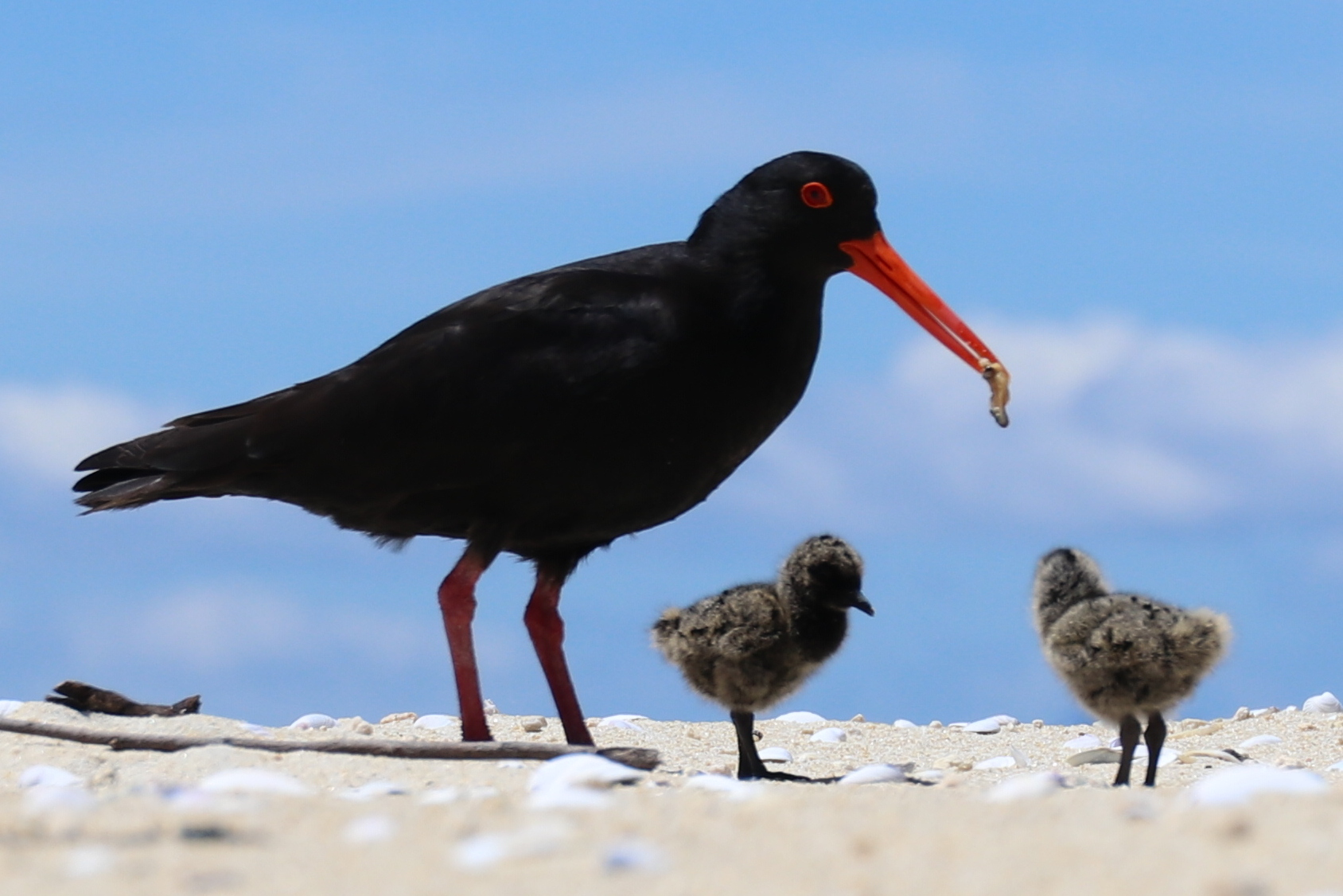
Feeding chicks

Stone-coloured eggs, usually in clutches of 2–3, are laid from September to December, and the nest is incubated by both parents until the chicks hatch. They usually lay 2-3 eggs but they can lay up to 5. The eggs are typically stone coloured with small brown patches all over. Eggs hatch in 25–32 days. Nests consist of scrapes in the sand, usually surrounded by some vegetation for concealment. Both parents take turns guarding the nest from predators until the chicks hatch and fledge between the following February–March. Chicks are well camouflaged by their colour and can fly in about 6 weeks. The fledging period lasts for approximately 20–50 days, but can be longer. During this time, the adults may also begin moulting, with data suggesting moult timing anywhere between December–July. At 6 weeks, the chicks are able to fly, and will begin foraging by themselves within their parent's territory.

By the beginning of their first fall season, usually early August, the young leave their parent's care and join other juveniles to form a loose flock. These juveniles will remain together until they are about 2 years old, where they will then disperse to find their own territories and breeding partners. After breeding they may be seen within flocks, or on the edges of flocks, of black and white South Island pied oystercatcher (SIPO) which also have vivid orange beaks. Maturity is thought to be around 3 years of age, and most individuals begin breeding within 3–6 years of birth. The average age of the species is unknown, but individuals as old as 32 years have been banded across New Zealand.

== Conservation ==
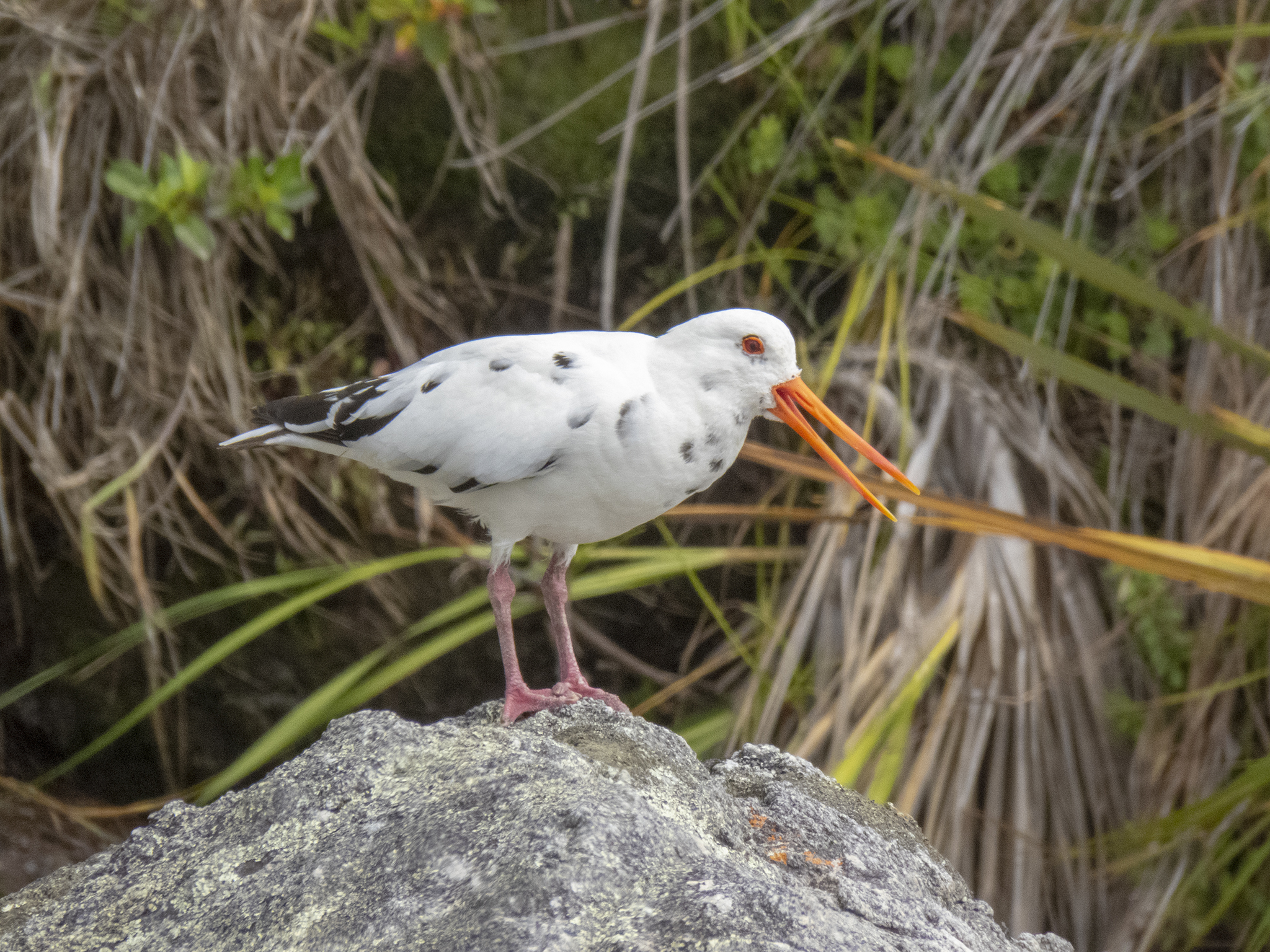
Piebald variable oystercatcher

Throughout its entire range, H. unicolor is currently estimated to have 4,000–5,000 individuals total. Although this number appears low, the species is considered of least concern ecologically and noted to be in acceptable health. While no conservation efforts are in effect, other pieces of legislation that protect threatened and endangered coastal birds provide some additional resources for the oystercatchers as well. The species has increased in population over the past several generations and is expected to continue rising. H. unicolor has the national conservation status of "At Risk, Recovering" but is regarded as being "Regionally Vulnerable" in the Wellington region.

=== Predators, parasites, and diseases ===
Up until 1922 Haematopus unicolor was shot for food by humans which saw a significant drop in numbers. Adult birds are preyed on by mammalian predators such as possums, and dogs. Nest and chick predators are mainly kelp gulls, silver gulls, swamp harriers, Australian magpies, skuas, mustelids, dogs, and possibly rats. The variable oystercatcher has issues with disturbance from human activity which damages nests. Habitat loss such as decreasing coastal dunes that provide essential breeding locations for the species are likely to have a large impact on all populations. Fishing nets and oil spills also pose threatening for the species. Additionally, parasites from genera such as Cestoda and Digenea have both been found in individuals. Specifically, Taenia increscens, a cestode, is found exclusively on Variable Oystercatchers. Most recently, a tapeworm was discovered in an individual during research that required handling of the birds in Tasman Bay, and was the first instance of a wild bird species ever contracting a tapeworm. These parasites do not harm the host, and are expected to simply consume a small supply of resources that the bird intakes. Similarly, disease is not a large contributing factor to mortality. Avian pox has been documented, but does not appear to be problematic for the species and rarely causes death.
