= Māngere Mountain =

Volcanic cone in Auckland, New Zealand

- Mount Mangere, Te Pane-o-Mataaho, Te Ara Pueru
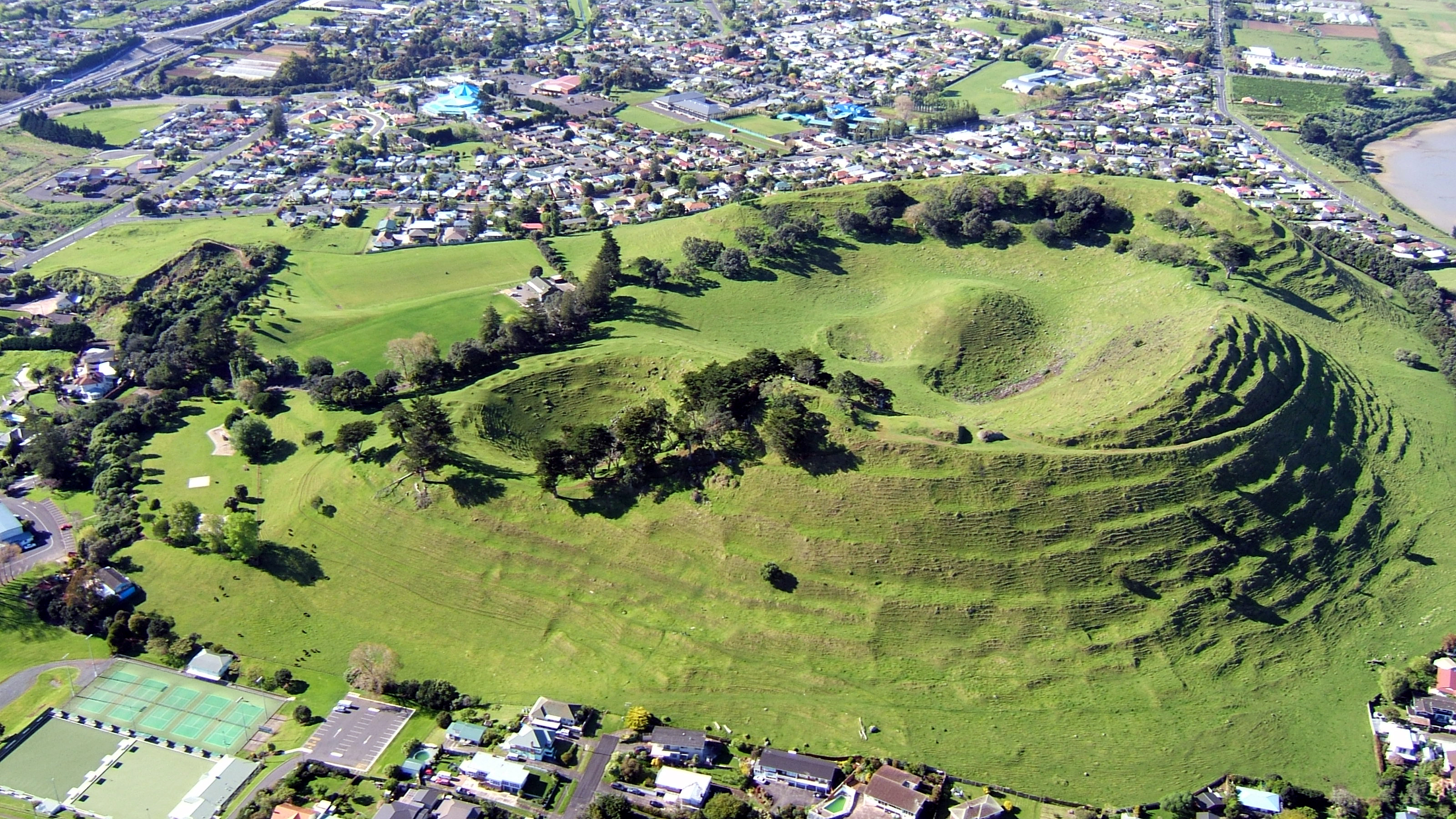
- Aerial view of Māngere Mountain in 2009, showing the two craters and archaeological terracing on the sides of the mountain

Highest point
- Elevation: 106 m (348 ft)
- Coordinates: 36°56′59″S 174°46′59″E

Geography
- Location within New Zealand
- Location: Māngere, Auckland, New Zealand

Geology
- Volcanic field: Auckland volcanic field

Māngere Mountain, also known by the names Te Pane-o-Mataaho and Te Ara Pueru, is a volcanic cone in Māngere, Auckland. Located within Māngere Domain, it is one of the largest volcanic cones in the Auckland volcanic field, with a peak 106 metres (348 ft) above sea level. It was the site of a major pā (Māori fortified settlement) and many of the pā's earthworks are still visible. It has extensive panoramic views of Auckland from its location in the southeastern portion of the city's urban area.

== Geography ==
The volcano features two large craters. It has a wide crater with a lava dome near its centre, a feature shared by no other volcano in Auckland. It first erupted approximately 70,000 years ago. The mountain is one of the largest and best preserved of Auckland's volcanic cones. Most of the suburb of Māngere Bridge was formed from the lava flows that came from the mountain's eruptions. Approximately 50,000 years ago, an eruption created hot fluid pāhoehoe lava flows, that travelled up to 10 km/h (6.2 mph) from Māngere Mountain into the Manukau Harbour, which can still be seen along Kiwi Esplanade.

Near the mountain to the southwest is Māngere Lagoon, which predates the formation of Māngere Mountain.

== History ==
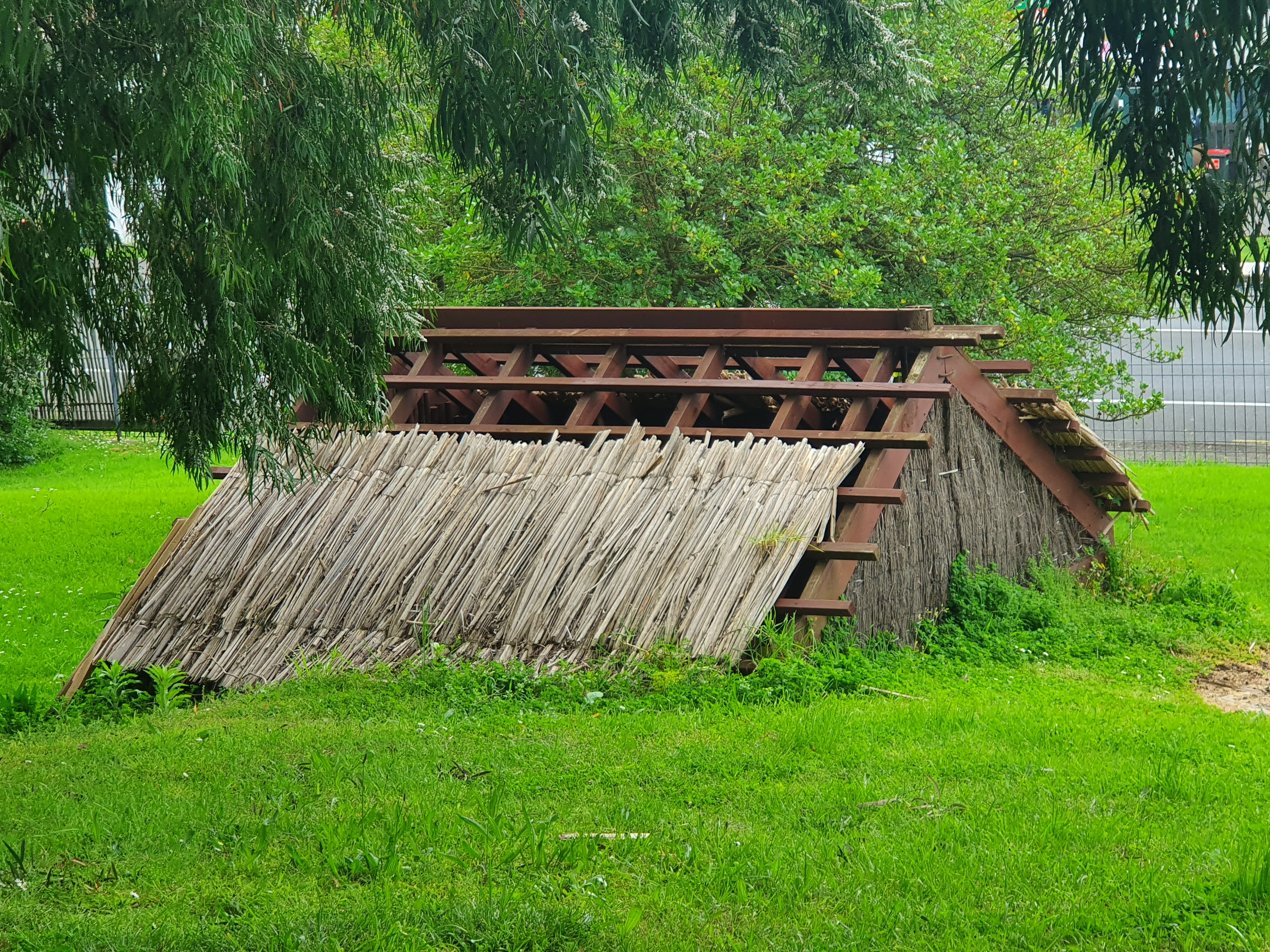
Recreated kūmara rua (sweet potato) storage pit at the Māngere Mountain Education Centre

Te Pane-o-Mataaho is one of the earliest names for the mountain, referring to Mataaho, an early Tāmaki Māori volcano god. Tāmaki Māori peoples settled the eastern coastline of the Manukau Harbour as early as the 14th century. By the 15th century, the slopes of Māngere Mountain became extensive gardens for crops including kūmara (sweet potatoes), and the gardens on the southern slopes were known Taotaoroa.

In the early 18th century, the mountain had become a major pā for the Waiohua, a confederacy of Tāmaki Māori iwi. The mountain complex may have been home to thousands of people, with the mountain acting as a central place for rua (food storage pits). Paramount chief Kiwi Tāmaki would stay at Māngere seasonally, when it was the time of year to hunt sharks in the Manukau Harbour. In the early 1740s, Kiwi Tāmaki was slain in battle by the Te Taoū hapū of Ngāti Whātua. After the battle, most Waiohua fled the region, although many of the remaining Waiohua warriors regrouped at Te Pane o Mataaho. The warriors strew pipi shells around the base of the mountain to warn against attacks, but Te Taoū warriors covered the pipi shells with dogskin cloaks to muffle the sound, and raided the pā at dawn. An alternate name for the mountain, Te Ara Pueru ("the dogskin cloak path"), references this event.

After the events of this war, Ngāti Whātua Ōrākei, a hapū created by the members of Te Taoū who remained near the Tāmaki isthmus, who intermarried with defeated members of Waiohua, settled the region. Originally the iwi were based on Maungakiekie / One Tree Hill, but after the death of paramount chief Tūperiri (circa 1795), the Māngere Bridge area and Onehunga became permanent kāinga (settlements) for Ngāti Whātua. In the 1820s and early 1830s, the threat of Ngāpuhi raiders from the north during the Musket Wars caused most of the Tāmaki Makaurau area to become deserted. During this period, a peace accord between Ngāpuhi and Waikato Tainui was reached through the marriage of Matire Toha, daughter of Ngāpuhi chief Rewa was married to Kati Takiwaru, the younger brother of Tainui chief Pōtatau Te Wherowhero, and they settled together on the slopes of Māngere Mountain. Ngāti Whātua returned to the Māngere-Onehunga area by the mid-1830s, re-establishing a pā on Māngere Mountain called Whakarongo.

In the late 1840s, Governor George Grey asked Pōtatau Te Wherowhero (then known as a powerful chief and negotiator, but later the first Māori King) to settle his people around Māngere Mountain to defend the township of Auckland, in an arrangement similar to the European Fencible Corps settlements on the outskirts of the Auckland township. Pōtatau Te Wherowhero and his Ngāti Mahuta relatives settled near to the land where his brother Kati Takiwaru lived, an area of 190 hectares (480 acres) around the base of Māngere Mountain. In the late 1850s, scoria from the mountain was used to construct the St James Anglican Church. During the invasion of the Waikato, the Ngāti Mahuta village land was seized under the New Zealand Settlements Act 1863, and the area around the mountain primarily became farmland for European settlers. In the 1890s, some land was returned to Ngāti Mahuta, and a cottage was built for King Tāwhiao near the mountain, housing family members of the king visiting Auckland or being educated at Auckland schools.

In 1890, the New Zealand Government set aside Māngere Mountain as a public reserve, for mixed recreation, quarrying and as a water supply. In 1932, a water reservoir was constructed atop Māngere Mountain, The northern sections of the mountain were quarried between 1924 and 1963, which afterwards were redeveloped into lawn bowls and tennis courts. In the same year, the eastern section of the quarry became home for the Onehunga-Mangere United football club.

In 1995, the Māngere Mountain Education Centre was established on the mountain through the work of Te Ākitai Waiohua kuia Mahia Wilson. The centre acts as a living museum, and members of Waiohua iwi impart traditional knowledge of storytelling, tool-making, traditional gardening and weaving to visitors. The house built for Tāwhiao was relocated to the centre in 2017.

In 2014, the Tūpuna Maunga Authority was established as a Treaty of Waitangi settlement, which passed ownership of Māngere Mountain to the collective. Major restoration work on the mountain began in 2019, when non-native trees were felled. From 2021, a large scale native bush planting and track upgrade project was undertaken on Māngere Mountain, including the construction of a specialised habitat for native skink species, and a new community playground. The recreation space was opened in December 2022, which included a kī-o-rahi field.

== Gallery ==
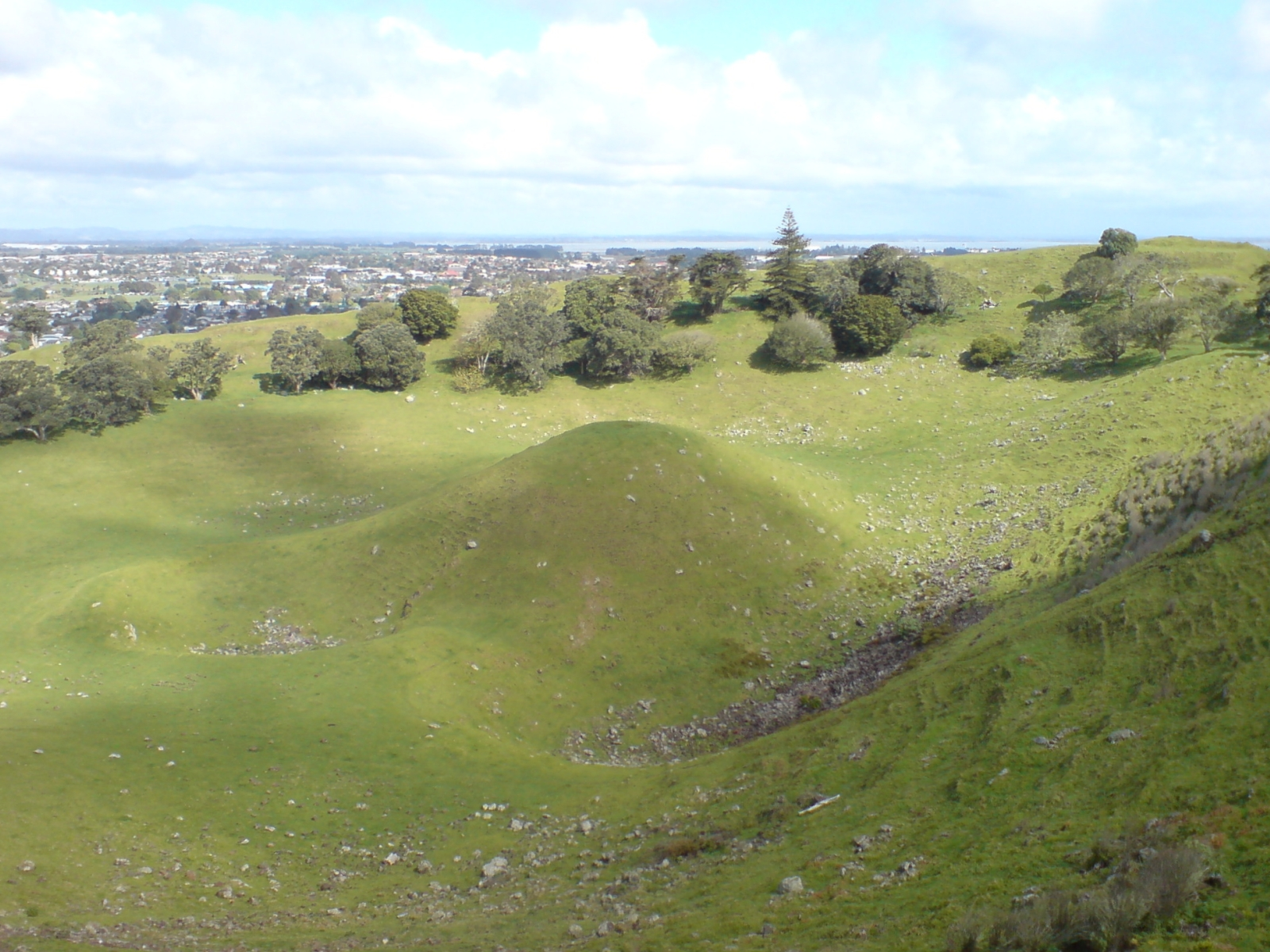
The central lava dome, or tholoid.

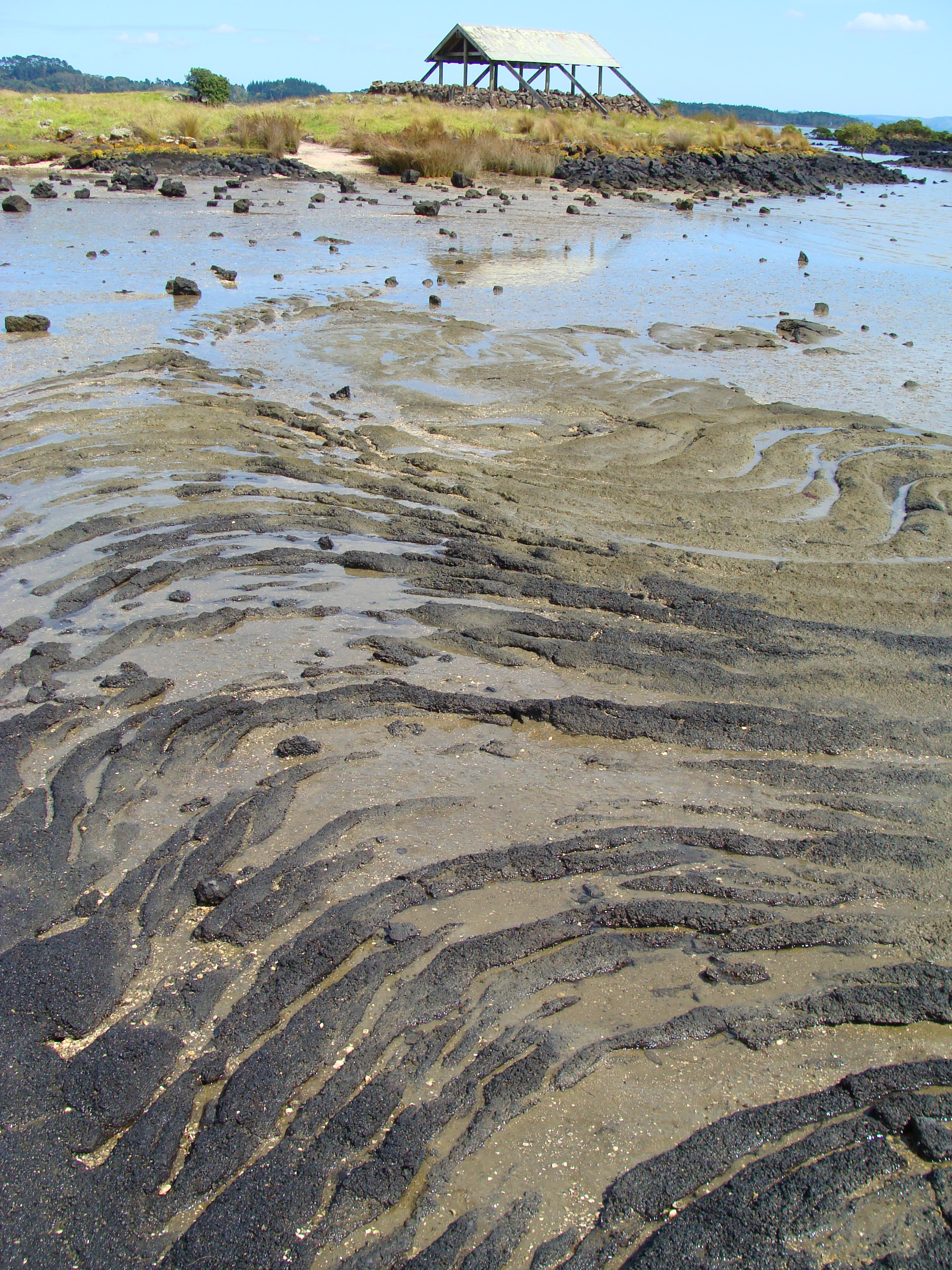
Pahoehoe lava flow from Mangere Mountain at nearby Ambury Regional Park

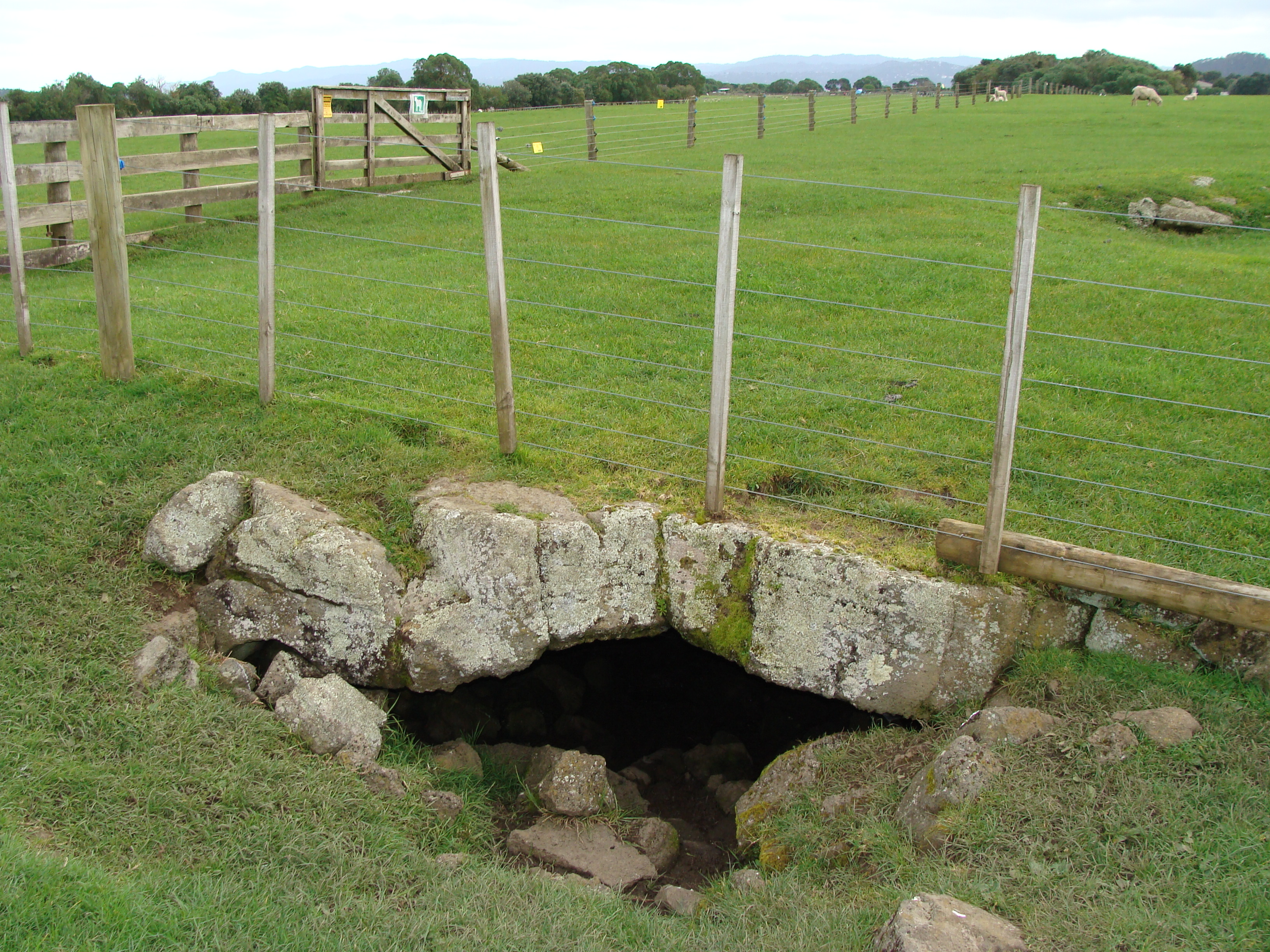
One of many small lava caves in lava flows from Mangere Mountain, at Ambury Regional Park

== Bibliography ==
- Ballara, Angela (2003). "Tāmaki-makau-rau (Auckland isthmus)". Taua: 'musket wars', 'land wars' or tikanga?: warfare in Maori society in the early nineteenth century. Auckland: Penguin. ISBN 9780143018896.
- Hayward, Bruce W. (2019). Volcanoes of Auckland: a Field Guide. Auckland University Press. ISBN 978-0-582-71784-8.
- Mackintosh, Lucy (2021). Shifting Grounds: Deep Histories of Tāmaki Makaurau Auckland. Bridget Williams Books. doi:10.7810/9781988587332. ISBN 978-1-988587-33-2.
- Stone, R. C. J. (2001). From Tamaki-makau-rau to Auckland. Auckland University Press. ISBN 1869402596.
