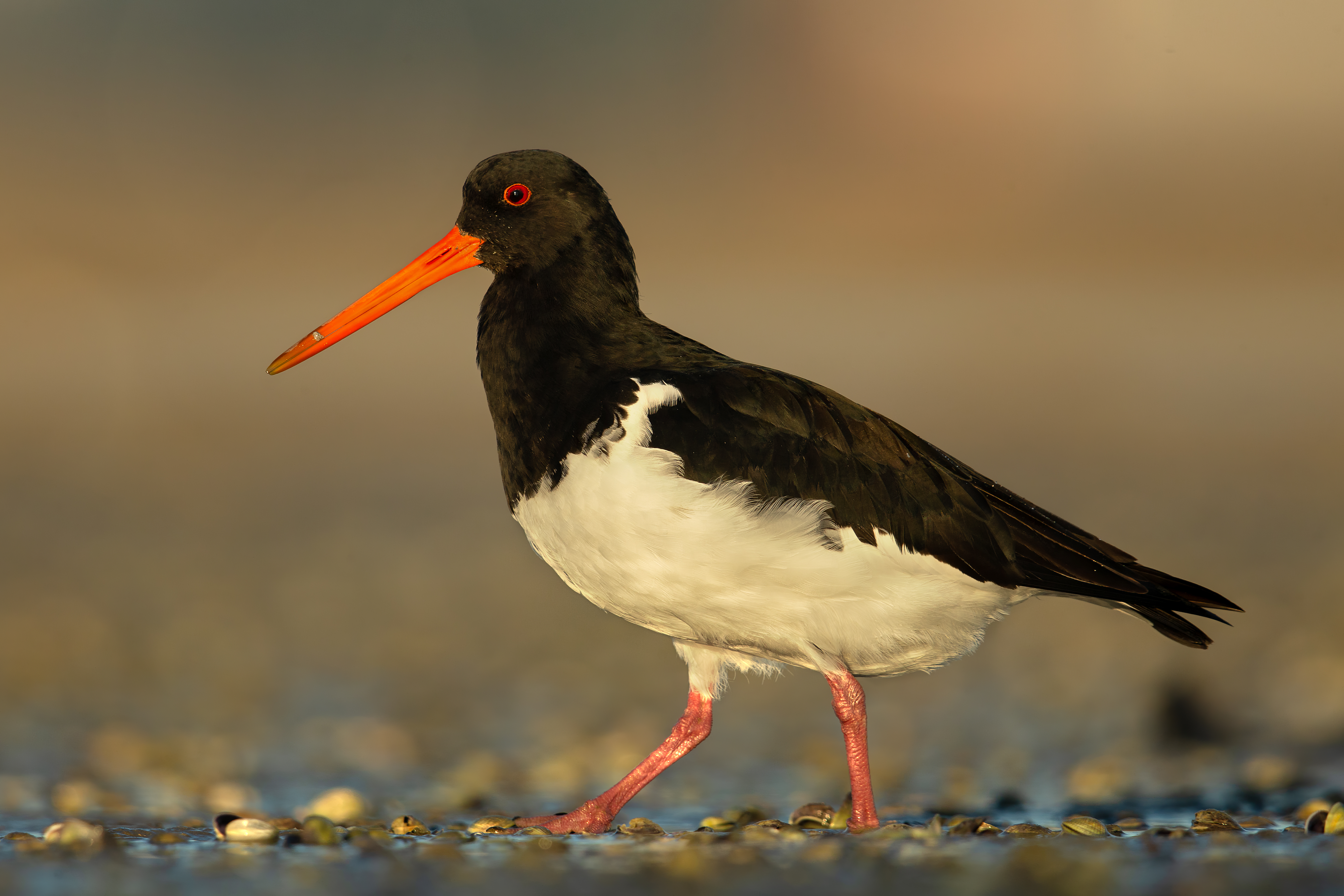

Conservation status
- Least Concern (IUCN 3.1)

Scientific classification
- Kingdom: Animalia
- Phylum: Chordata
- Class: Aves
- Order: Charadriiformes
- Family: Haematopodidae
- Genus: Haematopus
- Species: H. finschi

Binomial name
- Haematopus finschi G.H.Martens, 1897

= South Island oystercatcher =

Species of bird

The South Island oystercatcher or South Island pied oystercatcher (Haematopus finschi) is one of two common oystercatcher species found in New Zealand. Its name is often contracted to the acronym "SIPO" (rhyming with "typo"). The indigenous Māori name is tōrea. The scientific name commemorates the German ethnographer, naturalist and colonial explorer Friedrich Hermann Otto Finsch (8 August 1839 – 31 January 1917, Braunschweig).

== Description ==
The South Island oystercatcher is easily identifiable as a pied oystercatcher – a large wader with striking black and white plumage, long red-orange bill, and red legs. It is distinguished from the pied morph of the variable oystercatcher by a white lower back, more white on the wing, and a demarcation line of black and white further forward on the breast, and from the pied oystercatcher of Australia by a longer bill and shorter legs, as well as the forward demarcation line of white on the back being pointed rather than square. It is 46 cm in length; its wingspan is 80–86 cm; it weighs 550 g.

== Distribution and habitat ==
The South Island oystercatcher is endemic to New Zealand where it breeds inland on the South Island, after which most of the population moves to estuaries and harbors on the North Island. It has been recorded occasionally as a vagrant on Norfolk Island, Lord Howe Island, and the eastern coast of mainland Australia. Its breeding habitat comprises braided river systems, open paddocks, cultivated land, lake beaches, subalpine tundra, and herb fields. Non-breeding habitat includes coastal estuaries, bays, beaches, sand flats, and intertidal mudflats.

== Behaviour ==
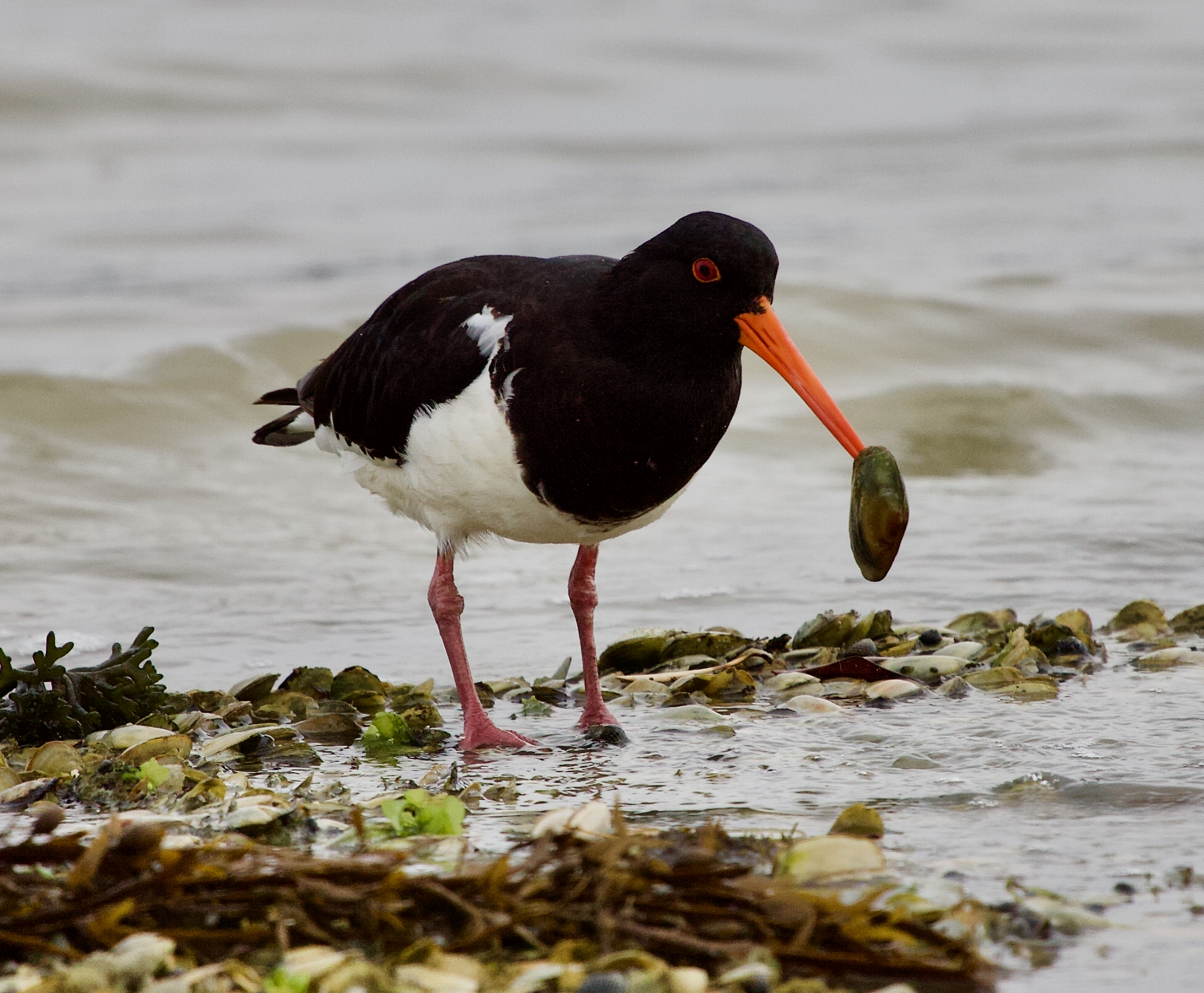
South Island oystercatcher (Haematopus finschi) foraging for food

=== Food ===
It mostly feeds on mollusks and worms. A major food source for oystercatchers is the New Zealand cockle, Austrovenus stutchburyi. It is estimated that an individual oystercatcher can eat around 200,000 cockles in a single year.

=== Voice ===
It has piping calls, which are used socially and aggressively, as well as a piercing alarm call and a quiet flight call.

=== Breeding ===
It nests in sand scrapes on farmland or gravel banks in braided rivers. Its clutch typically consists of two, sometimes three, brown eggs, which are blotched dark and pale brown. Its incubation period is 24–28 days, with both sexes incubating. Its young are precocial and nidifugous, fledging 6 weeks after hatching.

== Parasites ==
The flatworm Curtuteria australis is a parasite that infects South Island oystercatchers. Larvae which infect cockles are eaten by the birds, which in turn lay eggs and are excreted by the oystercatchers. The eggs are injected by whelks, which in turn are consumed by cockles.

== Conservation ==
The population of this species declined, mainly because of hunting, during the late 19th century and early 20th century but, with legal protection since 1940, has since been increasing. In 2002 the total population was estimated to be 110,000. Its conservation status is of Least Concern.
