= Regional parks of New Zealand =

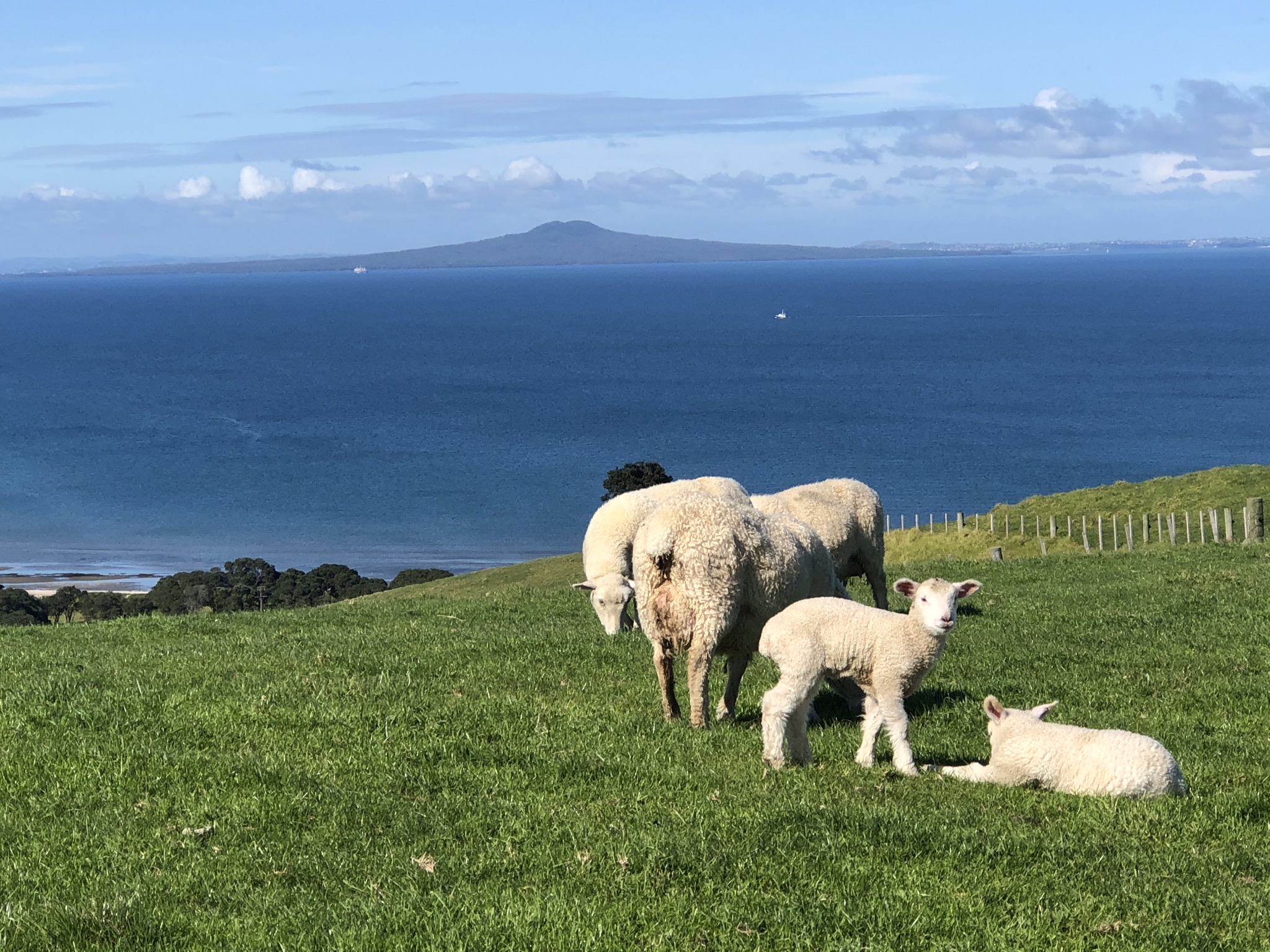
Shakespear Regional Park in Auckland

Regional parks of New Zealand are protected areas administered by regional councils, the top tier of local government. Regional parks are found across several regions of New Zealand: the Auckland Region, Waikato Region, Bay of Plenty Region, Hawkes Bay Region, Wellington Region and Canterbury Region. Regional parks in the Auckland and Waikato regions are administered by the Auckland Council, while parks in other areas are administered by regional councils: the Bay of Plenty Regional Council, Hawke's Bay Regional Council, Greater Wellington Regional Council, and Canterbury Regional Council.

== History ==
Regional parks in New Zealand are large open spaces typically outside the metropolitan boundaries of cities; larger than city parks and smaller than the National parks of New Zealand. The first regional park in New Zealand was the Waitākere Ranges Regional Park, which was established in 1964 when the Centennial Memorial Park of the Waitākere Ranges had its administration transferred to the Auckland Regional Authority. The first park purchased and established by the Auckland Regional Authority was Wenderholm Regional Park in 1965.

East Harbour Regional Park, managed by the Greater Wellington Regional Council, was the first regional park established in the Wellington Region in 1979.

The Local Government Act 2002 empowered other local government authorities outside of Auckland and Wellington to establish regional parks. The first of these was the Papamoa Hills Regional Park in the Bay of Plenty Region, established in 2004. The first regional park in the Canterbury Region was the Waimakariri River Regional Park, established in 2006.

In November 2010, local government reforms merged the different local government authorities of Auckland into a single unitary authority, the Auckland Council. During this process, areas of Franklin District and Manukau City were reassigned to the Waikato Region, including areas which included regional parks. Because of this, three regional parks are found in the northern Waikato, which are administered by the Auckland Council.

== List of regional parks ==
This table lists current regional parks from north to south.

Regional Park	Image	Region	Area km^{2}	Established	Location	Description
Te Ārai Regional Park		Auckland Region	4.77	2008	36.160°S 174.646°E	Coastal park at Te Ārai
Glenfern Sanctuary Regional Park		Auckland Region	0.83	2016	36.163°S 175.356°E	Native forested area on Great Barrier Island
Pākiri Regional Park		Auckland Region	2.51	2005	36.260°S 174.749°E	Coastal park in the northern Auckland Region and nesting area for the New Zealand fairy tern
Ātiu Creek Regional Park		Auckland Region	8.43	2008	36.330°S 174.364°E	A working sheep and cattle farm on the eastern shores of the Kaipara Harbour, near Wellsford
Tāwharanui Regional Park		Auckland Region	5.88	1973	36.372°S 174.827°E	Coastal farmland at the end of the Tāwharanui Peninsula, which includes the fenced Tāwharanui Open Sanctuary
Scandrett Regional Park		Auckland Region	0.48	2004	36.443°S 174.774°E	Coastal park near Warkworth
Te Rau Pūriri Regional Park		Auckland Region	3.49	2005	36.487°S 174.264°E	Regenerating forest and farmland park on the South Kaipara Head.
Mahurangi East Regional Park		Auckland Region	1.90	1988	36.491°S 174.742°E	Eastern headland of the Mahurangi Harbour, and Scott Point, the headland of the Te Kapa Peninsula. Formerly a part of the Mahurangi Regional Park.
Mahurangi West Regional Park		Auckland Region	1.00	1988	36.509°S 174.719°E	Western headland of the Mahurangi Harbour
Te Muri Regional Park		Auckland Region	4.44	2010	36.519°S 174.706°E	Coastal park and farmland near Te Muri Beach.
Wenderholm Regional Park		Auckland Region	1.49	1965	36.537°S 174.71°E	Coastal park between the Puhoi River and Waiwera River
Shakespear Regional Park		Auckland Region	3.77	1967	36.608°S 174.823°E	Coastal headland of the Whangaparāoa Peninsula, primarily farmland with areas of regenerating forest
Long Bay Regional Park		Auckland Region	1.77	1970s	36.675°S 174.745°E	Beach, sand dune and forested area to the north of the North Shore
Whakanewha Regional Park		Auckland Region	2.47	2007	36.822°S 175.077°E	Coastal park on Waiheke Island
Muriwai Regional Park		Auckland Region	4.36	1981	36.831°S 174.425°E	Coastal sand dune, wetland and golf course adjacent to Muriwai beach, featuring a mainland gannet colony
Motukorea Browns Island Regional Park		Auckland Region	0.6	2018	36.831°S 174.895°E	Island in the Hauraki Gulf
Ōmana Regional Park		Auckland Region	0.42	1970	36.881°S 175.023°E	Coastal park near Maraetai
Duder Regional Park		Auckland Region	1.65	1995	36.906°S 175.084°E	Working farm and regenerating forest on the Whakakaiwhara Peninsula, east of Auckland
Mutukāroa / Hamlins Hill Regional Park		Auckland Region	0.48	1997	36.920°S 174.832°E	Working farm and regenerating native forest in Auckland
Waitawa Regional Park		Auckland Region	1.88	2008	36.938°S 175.140°E	Coastal park and working farm to the west of Kawakawa Bay
Tawhitokino Regional Park		Auckland Region	0.41	1981	36.944°S 175.211°E	Area adjacent to Tawhitokino beach
Ambury Regional Park		Auckland Region	1.24	1987	36.948°S 174.766°E	A working sheep farm and bird sanctuary on the shores of the Manukau Harbour, Māngere Bridge.
Orere Point Regional Park		Auckland Region	0.43	1981	36.956°S 175.231°E	Small forested and coastal park near Ōrere Point
Waitākere Ranges Regional Park		Auckland Region	172.10	1964 (Note: The Waitākere Ranges Regional Park has grown over time, with the first sections reserved in 1895, and a sizeable portion, the Auckland Centennial Memorial Park opening in 1940. By 1964, the expanded park was proclaimed to be the Waitākere Ranges Regional Park.)	36.967°S 174.517°E	Native bush and coastal park in the Waitākere Ranges
Tāpapakanga Regional Park		Auckland Region	2.47	1995	36.979°S 175.258°E	Coastal farmland and forested ares at the mouth of the Firth of Thames
Auckland Botanic Gardens		Auckland Region	0.65	1982	37.013°S 174.907°E	Botanical garden in Manurewa, South Auckland. While officially a regional park by the Auckland Council, the botanic gardens are not managed under the regional park plan, and does not incorporate the term 'regional park' into its name.
Waharau Regional Park		Waikato Region (Note: Located in the Waikato Region, the park is administered by the Auckland Council.)	1.69	1979	37.040°S 175.290°E	Park between the Hunua Ranges and Firth of Thames
Hunua Ranges Regional Park		Waikato Region, Auckland Region (Note: The ranges are primarily found in the Waikato Region with the north-western section in the Auckland Region. The Regional Park is administered by the Auckland Council.)	178.42 (Note: Including both Hunua Ranges Regional Park and Hunua Falls Scenic Reserve)	1965 (Note: Hunua Ranges Regional Park was gradually purchased by the Auckland City Council for water supply operations from the 1920s onwards. When Auckland Regional Authority took over management of the area in 1965, the area became known as Hunua Regional Park.)	37.07°S 175.18°E	Mountain range south-east of Auckland, featuring areas of native forest and water reserves
Whakatīwai Regional Park		Waikato Region (Note: Located in the Waikato Region, the park is administered by the Auckland Council.)	3.24	1967	37.073°S 175.28°E	Coastal park between the Hunua Ranges and the Firth of Thames
Āwhitu Regional Park		Auckland Region	1.55	1975	37.094°S 174.651°E	Regional park composed of farmland, wetlands and regenerating forest on the eastern Āwhitu Peninsula
Papamoa Hills Regional Park		Bay of Plenty Region	1.82	2003	37.733°S 176.288°E	Native bush, open farmland and archaeological site southeast of Tauranga
Onekawa Te Mawhai Regional Park		Bay of Plenty Region	3.62	2010	37.990°S 177.167°E	Headland of the Ōhiwa Harbour in the Bay of Plenty Region
Tūtira Regional Park		Hawke's Bay	4.64	1999 (Note: Opened as Tūtira Country Park on 20 March 1999, renamed Tūtira Regional Park in 2013.)	39.234°S 176.893°E	A land use demonstration park between lakes Tutira and Waikopiro, with campgrounds and walking tracks.
Waitangi Regional Park		Hawke's Bay	3	2000	39.564°S 176.924°E	5 km long coastal located between Awatoto and Haumoana, known for wildlife, sports and the Atea a Rangi star compass.
Pākōwhai Regional Park		Hawke's Bay		1973	39.603°S 176.870°E	The smallest of Hawke’s Bay’s regional parks. Popular for dog walking.
Pekapeka Regional Park		Hawke’s Bay	0.98	1990s	39.721°S 176.768°E	One of the few remaining wetland areas in Hawke’s Bay, and a site of restoration.
Queen Elizabeth Park		Wellington Region	6.38	1953	40.965°S 174.969°E	
Akatarawa Forest		Wellington Region	155.00		41.041°S 175.037°E	Native forest north of Upper Hutt
Battle Hill Farm Forest Park		Wellington Region	4.80	1987	41.060°S 174.940°E	
Kaitoke Regional Park		Wellington Region	28.6	1983	41.069°S 175.199°E	
Pakuratahi Forest		Wellington Region	80		41.141°S 175.161°E	
Belmont Regional Park		Wellington Region	32.92	1986	41.190°S 174.875°E	
Wainuiomata Regional Park		Wellington Region	3.40	2022 (Note: Prior to 2022, the regional park was known as Wainuiomata Recreation Area.)	41.2792°S 174.9844°E	
East Harbour Regional Park		Wellington Region	23.39	1979	41.29°S 174.91°E	Regional Park in three sections: the Northern Forest, an area southwest of Wainuiomata and east of the Wellington Harbour which includes the Butterfly Creek valley, Parangarahu Lakes Area, the area east of Pencarrow Head which includes Lake Kohangapiripiri and Lake Kohangatera, and Baring Head / Ōrua-pouanui
Ashley Rakahuri Regional Park		Canterbury Region	4.17	2012	43.2816°S 172.5806°E	Banks of the Ashley River / Rakahuri and Okuku Rivers
Waimakariri River Regional Park		Canterbury Region	150	2006	43.436°S 172.574°E	Banks of the Waimakariri River
Ferrymead Regional Park		Canterbury Region	0.76	2018	43.566°S 172.702°E	On the southern banks of the Ōpāwaho / Heathcote River, surrounding Ferrymead Heritage Park
Lake Tekapo Regional Park		Canterbury Region	1.65	2008	44.00°S 170.5°E	Eastern shores of Lake Tekapo

== List of regional council administered areas ==
This table lists areas administered under regional park systems or by regional councils, from north to south.

Regional Park	Image	Region	Area km^{2}	Established	Location	Description
Mount Smart		Auckland Region	0.22	1985	36.918°S 174.812°E	Domain and stadium in central Auckland, which came under the administration of the Auckland Regional Authority in 1985, later the Auckland Regional Council from 1989. Until the dissolution of the Auckland Regional Council in 2010, Mount Smart Domain was mentioned in regional park documents.
Te Motu a Hiaroa / Puketutu		Auckland Region	0.187	N/A	36.965°S 174.746°E	Island in the Manukau Harbour, South Auckland. While officially designated as a regional park by the Auckland Council, the island is currently leased by Watercare Services, who are reconstructing the quarried hills with biosolids. Once filling operations have ceased by 2049, the island is planned to be redeveloped into a regional park and cultural centre, including a marae and wānanga.
Hutt Water Collection Area		Wellington Region	89	1951	41.010°S 175.155°E	
Whitireia Park		Wellington Region	1.8	1976	41.100°S 174.854°E	Southern headland of Porirua Harbour. While it shares features with regional parks and is listed alongside other regional parks of Wellington, it is not a regional park due to being administered by the Whitireia Park Board.
Hutt River Trail		Wellington Region			41.1619°S 174.9774°E	Walking and cycling path along the banks of the Hutt River
Wairarapa Moana Wetlands		Wellington Region	90		41.234°S 175.193°E	Lake Wairarapa, Lake Ōnoke and a section of wetlands on the eastern shore of Lake Wairarapa
Wainuiomata Water Collection Area		Wellington Region			41.262°S 175.01°E	Proposed site of the Puketahā wildlife sanctuary.
Northern Pegasus Bay		Canterbury Region			43.268°S 172.720°E	Shores of Pegasus Bay north of the Waimakariri River mouth

== See also ==
- Protected areas of New Zealand
- Conservation in New Zealand
- Forest parks of New Zealand
- National parks of New Zealand
