= Pākiri =

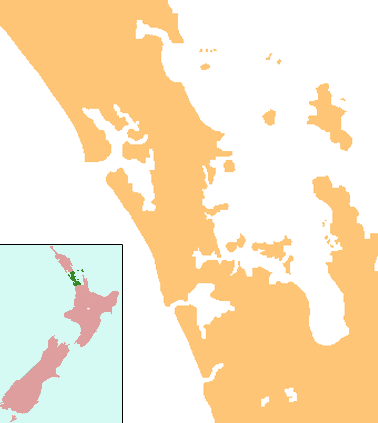
- Location within New Zealand Auckland
- Coordinates: 36°15′51″S 174°43′38″E
- Country: New Zealand
- Region: Auckland Region
- District: Auckland Council
- Community board: Rodney Local Board
- Subdivision: Wellsford subdivision

Area
  - Total: 28.52 km^{2} (11.01 sq mi)

Population (2023 Census)
  - Total: 192
  - Density: 6.73/km^{2} (17.4/sq mi)

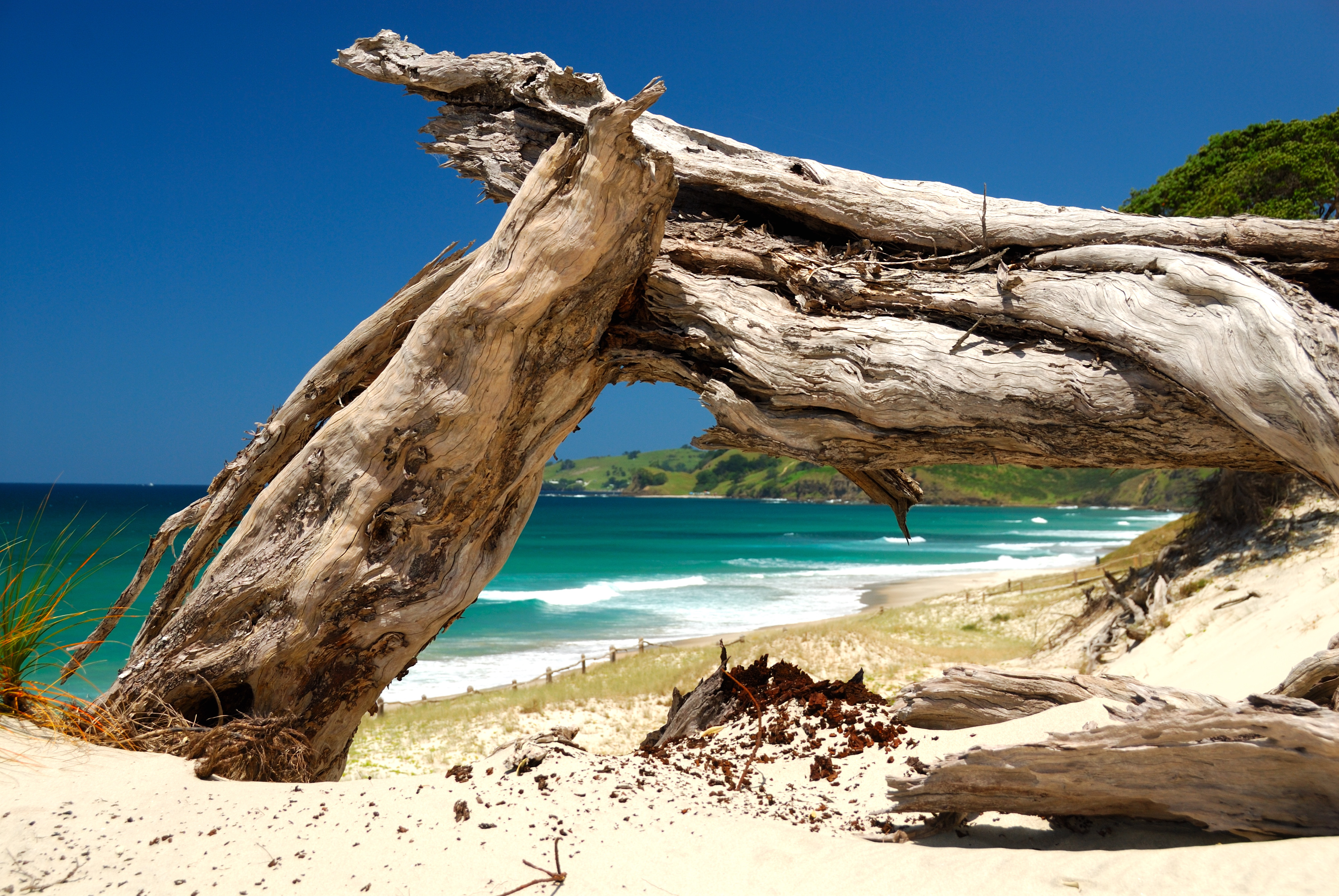
Pākiri Beach

Pākiri is a locality in Auckland, in the former Rodney District of New Zealand. Leigh is about 9 kilometres (6 mi) to the south-east. The Pākiri River flows through the area and into the Hauraki Gulf / Tīkapa Moana to the north-east.

The area is named for the Ngāti Wai chief, Te Kiri. The beach was originally known by the name Ngā One Haea o Pākiri ("The Gleaming White Sands of Pakiri"), Pākiri being the name of the Ngāti Wai pā found at the headlands of the Pākiri River. Ngāti Manuhiri, an iwi descended from the early Ngāti Wai ancestors in the area, are the mana whenua for the Pākiri area.

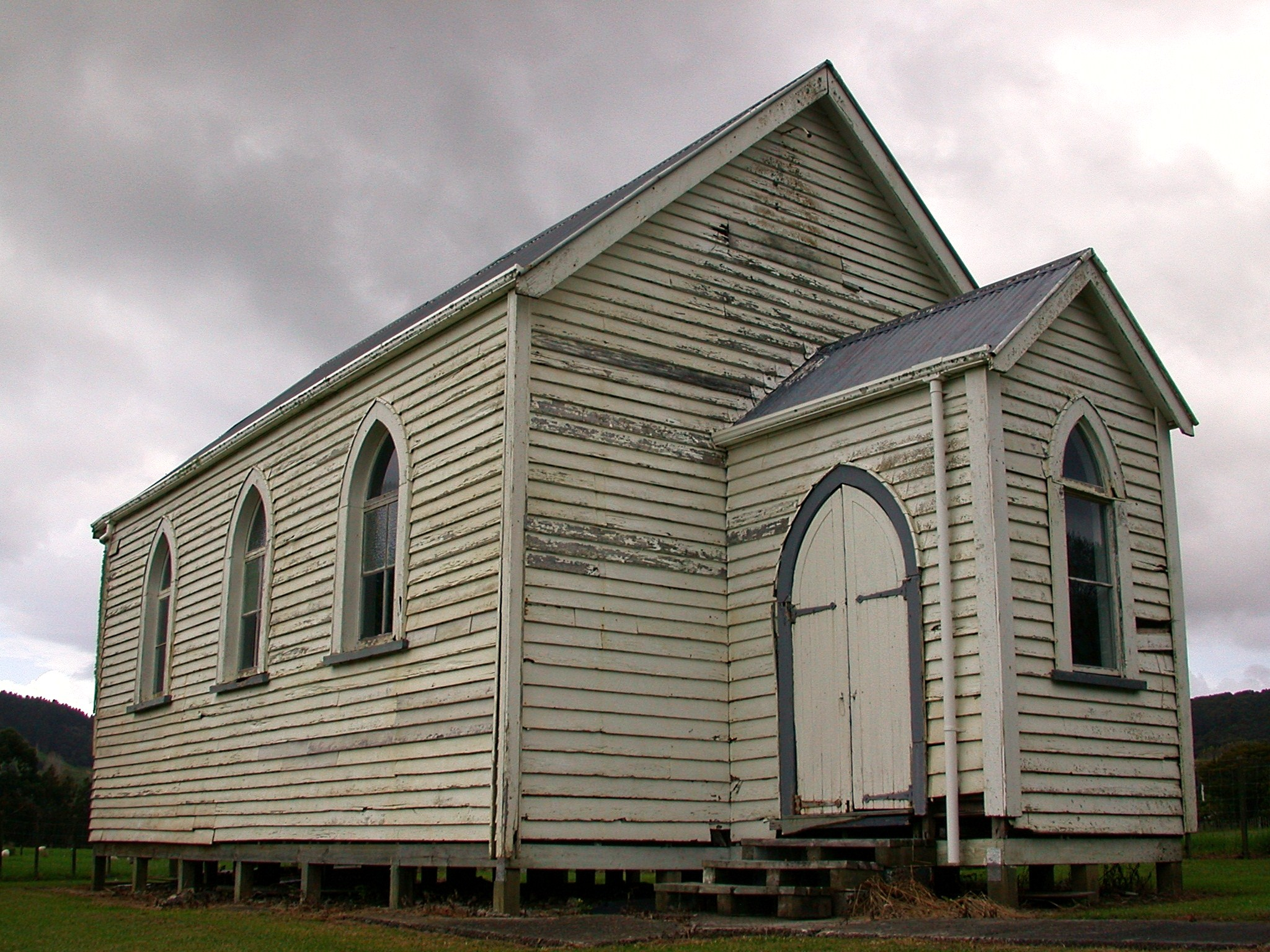
The old Pākiri Church, a popular backdrop for wedding photographs

== Geography ==
Pākiri Beach is a 14-kilometre-long (8.7 mi) white sandy beach to the north. It is a tourist destination known for its natural environment. The Auckland Regional Council purchased two blocks of land in 2005, totalling 178 hectares (440 acres), with three kilometres (2 mi) of beach frontage, and is developed this into the Pākiri Regional Park.

== History ==
During the 1860s, Pākiri Beach was the location of a kauri sawmill at the mouth of the Pākiri River.

A Pakiri Road District was formed 26 September 1867 but no evidence exists of a road board ever being operational and the district is not mentioned after 1876.

Suction dredging has been used to mine sand from the sea floor off the coast since the 1950s.

== Demographics ==
Pākiri is in an SA1 statistical area which covers 28.52 km^{2} (11.01 sq mi) and includes Pākiri Beach. The SA1 area is part of the larger Cape Rodney statistical area.

Historical population
Year	Pop.	±% p.a.
2006	147	—
2013	141	−0.59%
2018	171	+3.93%
2023	192	+2.34%

The SA1 statistical area had a population of 192 in the 2023 New Zealand census, an increase of 21 people (12.3%) since the 2018 census, and an increase of 51 people (36.2%) since the 2013 census. There were 93 males, 99 females and 3 people of other genders in 72 dwellings. 4.7% of people identified as LGBTIQ+. The median age was 50.9 years (compared with 38.1 years nationally). There were 21 people (10.9%) aged under 15 years, 30 (15.6%) aged 15 to 29, 93 (48.4%) aged 30 to 64, and 48 (25.0%) aged 65 or older.

People could identify as more than one ethnicity. The results were 76.6% European (Pākehā); 37.5% Māori; 6.2% Pasifika; 3.1% Middle Eastern, Latin American and African New Zealanders (MELAA); and 3.1% other, which includes people giving their ethnicity as "New Zealander". English was spoken by 95.3%, Māori language by 7.8%, Samoan by 1.6%, and other languages by 6.2%. No language could be spoken by 3.1% (e.g. too young to talk). The percentage of people born overseas was 10.9, compared with 28.8% nationally.

Religious affiliations were 26.6% Christian, 18.8% Māori religious beliefs, 1.6% New Age, and 1.6% other religions. People who answered that they had no religion were 48.4%, and 6.2% of people did not answer the census question.

Of those at least 15 years old, 27 (15.8%) people had a bachelor's or higher degree, 99 (57.9%) had a post-high school certificate or diploma, and 42 (24.6%) people exclusively held high school qualifications. The median income was $36,700, compared with $41,500 nationally. 12 people (7.0%) earned over $100,000 compared to 12.1% nationally. The employment status of those at least 15 was that 72 (42.1%) people were employed full-time, 39 (22.8%) were part-time, and 3 (1.8%) were unemployed.

== Education ==
Pakiri School is a coeducational full primary school (years 1-8) with a roll of 8 students as of March 2026. Most children are of Māori descent and are affiliated to Ngati Wai and Ngati Manuhiri. The school celebrated its 125th jubilee in 2002.
