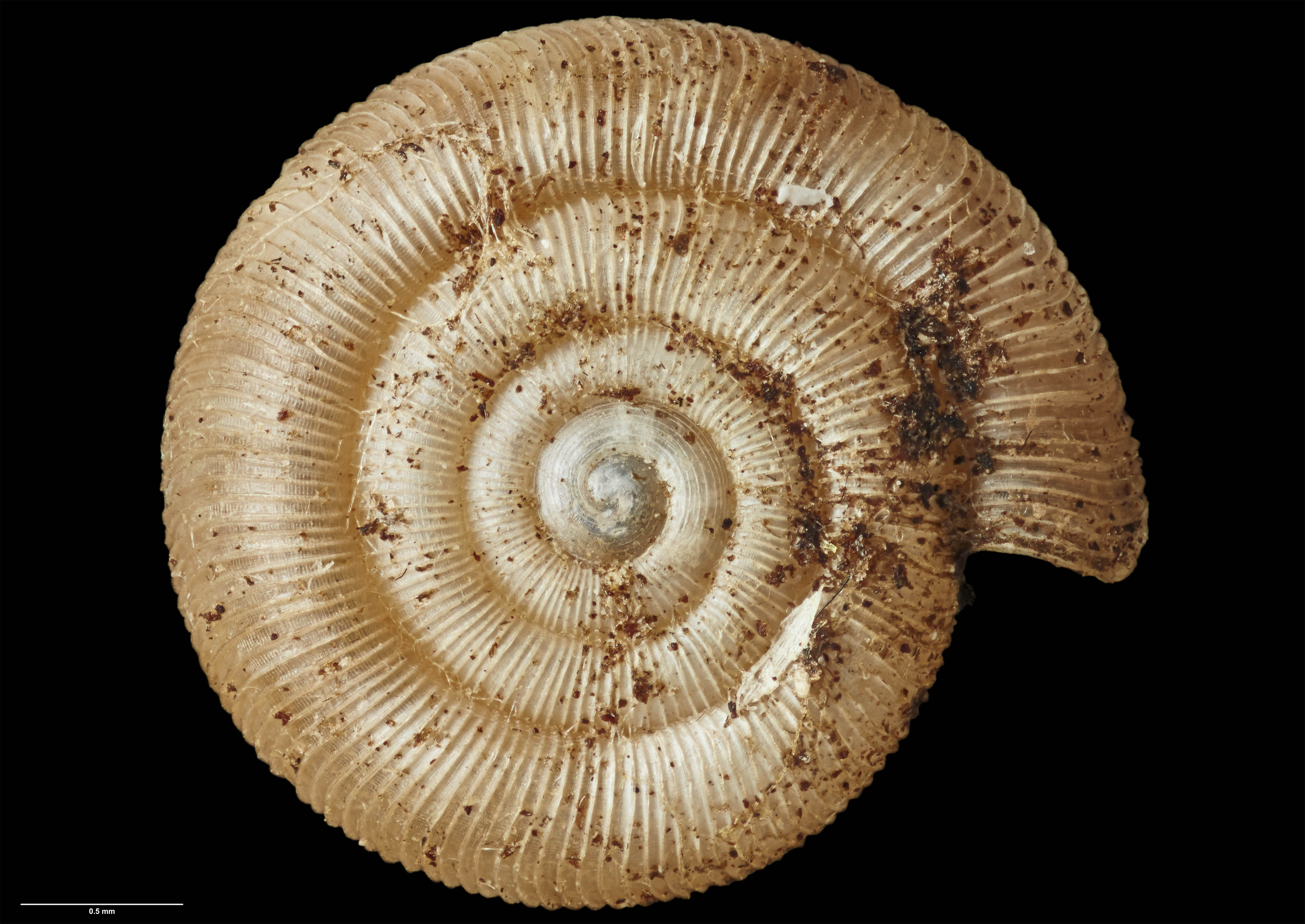
- Holotype from the Auckland War Memorial Museum

Scientific classification
- Kingdom: Animalia
- Phylum: Mollusca
- Class: Gastropoda
- Order: Stylommatophora
- Superfamily: Punctoidea
- Family: Charopidae
- Genus: Climocella
- Species: C. rata

Binomial name
- Climocella rata Goulstone, 1996

= Climocella rata =

Species of land snail

Climocella rata is a species of land snail belonging to the family Charopidae. Endemic to New Zealand, the species is found in the Auckland and Waikato Regions, often in northern rātā leaf litter.

== Description ==
C. rata has a shell that measures up to 3 mm (0.12 in) by 1.8 mm (0.071 in), with a subdiscoidal shell of 3.75 whorls, and a protoconch of 1.5 whorls with 9-10 spiral lirae. It has a flat spire, and broad indistinct brown bands against a light brown background. The animal has a broad area of black pigmentation. The species can be identified due to its shell colour, flat to slightly depressed spire, and black pigmentation of the pallial cavity roof.

== Taxonomy ==
The species was first described by James Frederick Goulstone in 1995, who named the species after the northern rātā, a prominent tree at the species' type locality in the Hunua Ranges. Goulstone collected the holotype of the species from the upper Whakatīwai Regional Park in the Hunua Ranges at a height of approximately 160 m (520 ft) above sea-level on 11 May 1995, which is held by the Auckland War Memorial Museum.

== Ecology ==
The species is often found in northern rātā leaf litter, and occasionally in Astelia leaf litter.

== Distribution and habitat ==
C. rata is endemic to New Zealand, found in the upper North Island in the Auckland Region and Waikato Region, including the Coromandel Peninsula, Hapuakohe Range, Hunua Range, Kaimai Range, and on Great Barrier Island and Waiheke Island in the Hauraki Gulf.

== Gallery ==
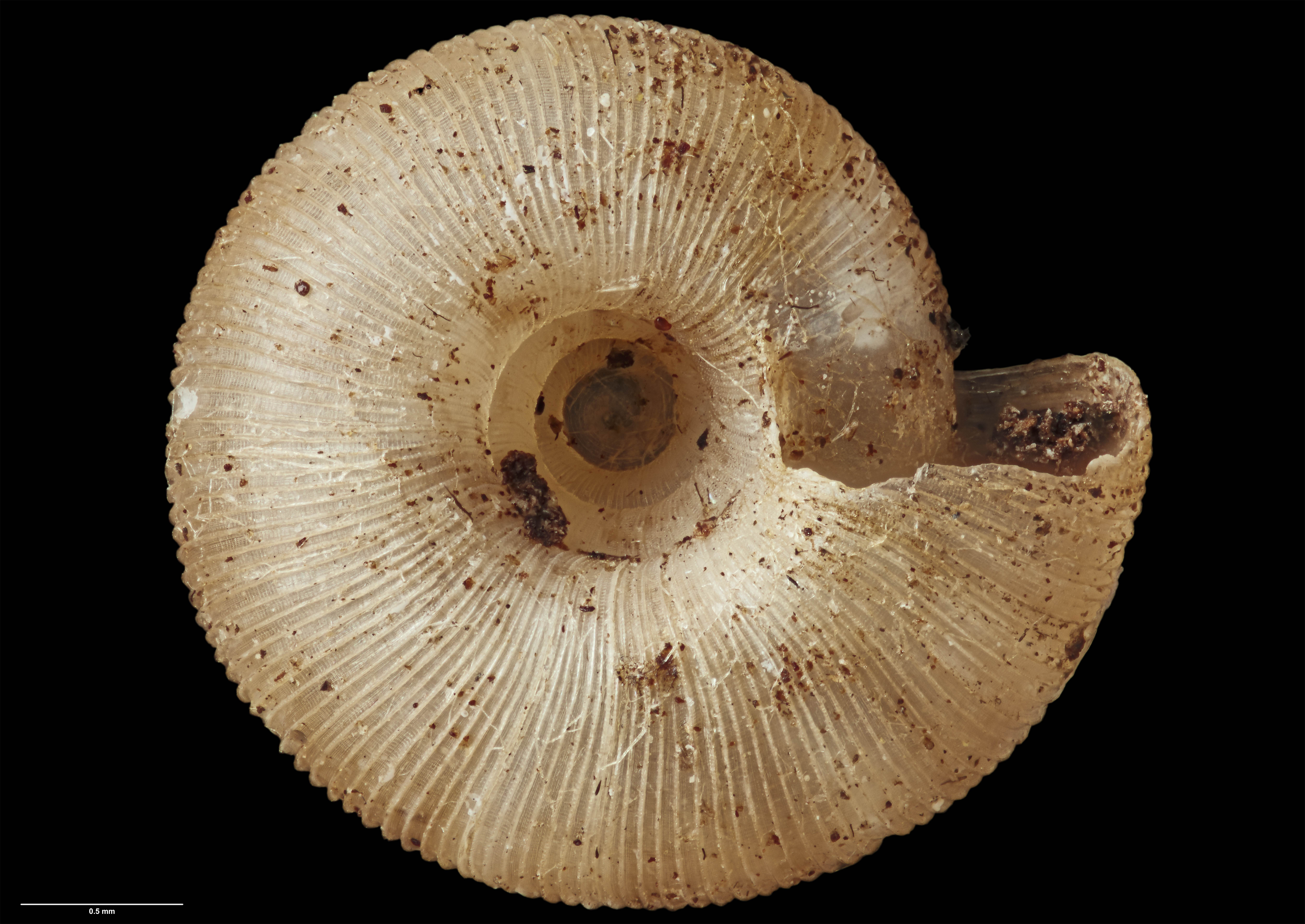
Underside view of holotype

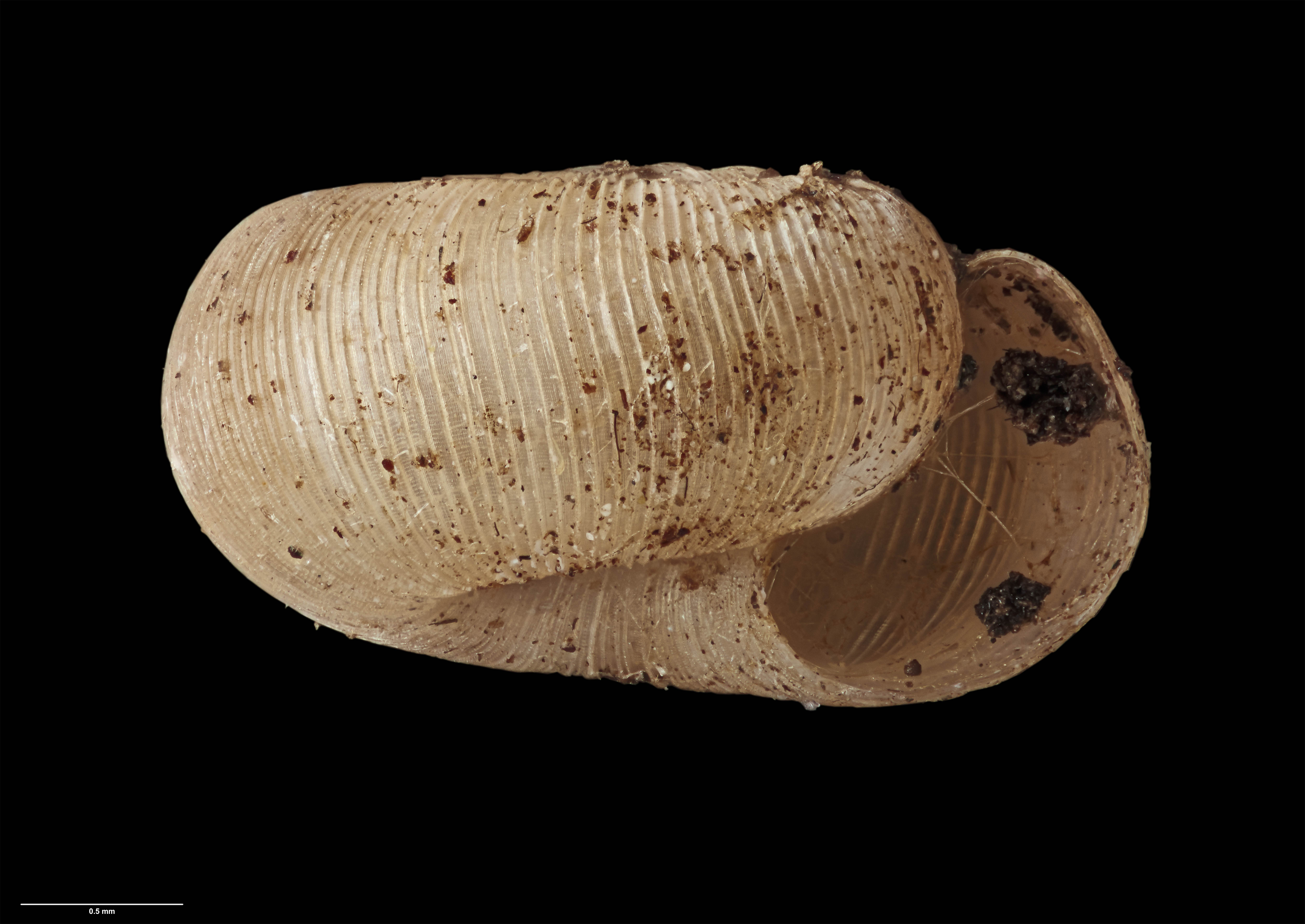
Side view of holotype
