= Stephen Town =

New Zealand chief executive

Stephen Town (born 1959 or 1960) is a chief executive in New Zealand. Formerly the chief executive of Auckland Council, Town was the inaugural chief executive for vocational education provider Te Pūkenga–New Zealand Institute of Skills & Technology from 6 July 2020 to 16 August 2022.

== Early life ==
Town received his secondary education at Wellington College and left there six weeks into seventh form. He graduated from Wanganui Regional Community Polytechnic and in his late 20s, he graduated from Massey University with an executive MBA after studying part-time. Town is married with six children; there are two grandchildren.

== Professional career ==
Town's first leadership role was at Wanganui Regional Community Polytechnic from 1994 to 1998, making him the country's youngest chief executive at that time. He was chief executive for Franklin District Council from July 1998 to July 2002. He was the chief executive for Tauranga City Council from July 2002 to October 2010. He was a regional director for the Auckland/Northland region of the NZ Transport Agency from October 2010 to December 2013.

From 15 January 2014, Town was the chief executive for Auckland Council. He replaced the inaugural CEO, Doug McKay. Town had a starting salary of NZ$630,000. Later, his salary at Auckland Council was NZ$698,000. In early February 2020, it became known that Town has resigned prior to his employment term ending in December 2020. On 4 February 2020, it was announced that Town was going to be the inaugural chief executive of New Zealand's new mega-polytech, Te Pūkenga–New Zealand Institute of Skills & Technology, commencing on 6 July 2020.

In early July 2022, Town took "personal leave" from his position as CEO of Te Pūkenga for undisclosed reasons. Te Pūkenga council member Peter Winder assumed the position of chief executive in his absence. On 10 July, the Waikato Times reported that Town was earning an annual salary of between NZ$670,000 and NZ$679,000, which exceeded Prime Minister Jacinda Ardern's annual salary of NZ$471,049. The newspaper also reported that a memo by Tertiary Education Commission deputy chief executive Gillian Dudgeon had identified several problems facing the mega polytechnic including a lack of leadership, a deficit of NZ$110 million (which exceeded the organisation's budget of NZ$57.5 million), and declining enrolments in the 2022 academic year. In addition, Stuff reported that Town was still earning up to NZ$13,000 while on "special leave."

In response, the opposition National Party's tertiary education spokesperson Penny Simmonds suggested that Town's departure on "special leave" reflected problems with the Government's plans to merge the polytechnics into a mega entity. In mid-August 2022, Simmonds alleged that Town had been "shoulder-tapped" for the role of CEO of Te Pūkenga and lodged an Official Information Act request into the mega polytechnic's chief executive recruitment process.

Town resigned his position of CEO on 16 August 2022. His responsibilities and duties were assumed by Acting-CEO Peter Winder.
