= Papamoa Hills Regional Park =

Regional park in New Zealand

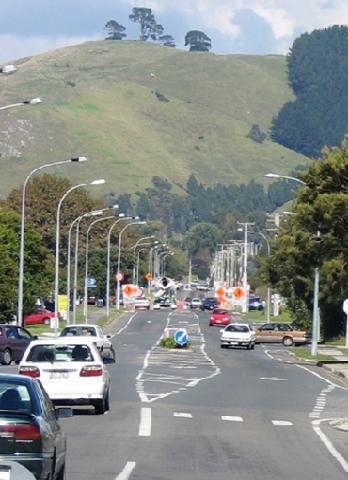
- Papamoa Hills from Papamoa

- Location within New Zealand
- Location: Western Bay of Plenty District, Bay of Plenty Region, New Zealand
- Coordinates: 37°43′57″S 176°17′15″E
- Area: 135 ha (330 acres)
- Established: 2003
- Visitors: 80,000 (in 2016)

Papamoa Hills Regional Park is a protected area in the Bay of Plenty Region, owned and managed by Bay of Plenty Regional Council. It is located between Papamoa and Te Puke, on Poplar Lane off State Highway 2.

It covers 135 hectares of native bush and open farmland. The landscape consists of steep hills, reaching to a summit of 224 metres with sweeping views of the Bay of Plenty coastline from the Coromandel Peninsula to East Cape.

The area is a traditional home for where Papamoa’s original Māori inhabitants, including Waitaha, Ngā Pōtiki, Ngāti Pūkenga and Ngāti He. Its traditional Māori name is Te Rae o Pāpāmoa, translating roughly as "the forehead of the woman who is the hills".

== Features ==
The park is an operational farm several gates, located behind a Fulton Hogan quarry with regular truck traffic.

There are several walking tracks, all requiring a reasonable level of fitness. These include a 45-minute track from Poplar Lane to the trig station at the summit.

Camping, motorbikes, mountain bikes, horse trekking and fires are banned, and dogs are banned at all times. There is no drinking water supply available in the park. The park and carpark is open during daylight hours, with later closing times during winter.

== History ==
There are over 2000 archaeological and cultural sites within the park, dating back to 1650, including Te Ihu o Ruarangi Pā and six other pā.

The pine trees at the summit of Pāpāmoa Hills, planted by Colin Peter Campbell McNaughton in the early 1900s, are over 120 years old. Initially, there were five trees, but they were toppled by strong winds in the early 2000s. Another pine tree, located beside the Pāpāmoa Pā, was removed due to falling branches, posing a hazard to the area in 2016.

The park was established in 2003 to protect these sites, becoming the first regional park outside the Auckland and Wellington regions. Over 50,000 native plants have been planted on the trees since then.

Visitor numbers quadrupled between 2006 and 2016, when about 80,000 people were visiting the park every year.

An additional 25 hectares were added to the park in 2017.

In September 2020, the summit track was briefly closed for an upgrade.

In December 2020, Bay of Plenty Regional Council approved a concept design for a more substantial upgrade in December 2020, including a new carpark, new amenities, a new entranceway, and signage to explain the site's history and cultural importance. Work was due to start in late 2021. Local iwi and hapū were consulted on and supported the plan.

== See also ==
- Regional parks of New Zealand
- Protected areas of New Zealand
