= Pākiri Regional Park =

Regional park in New Zealand

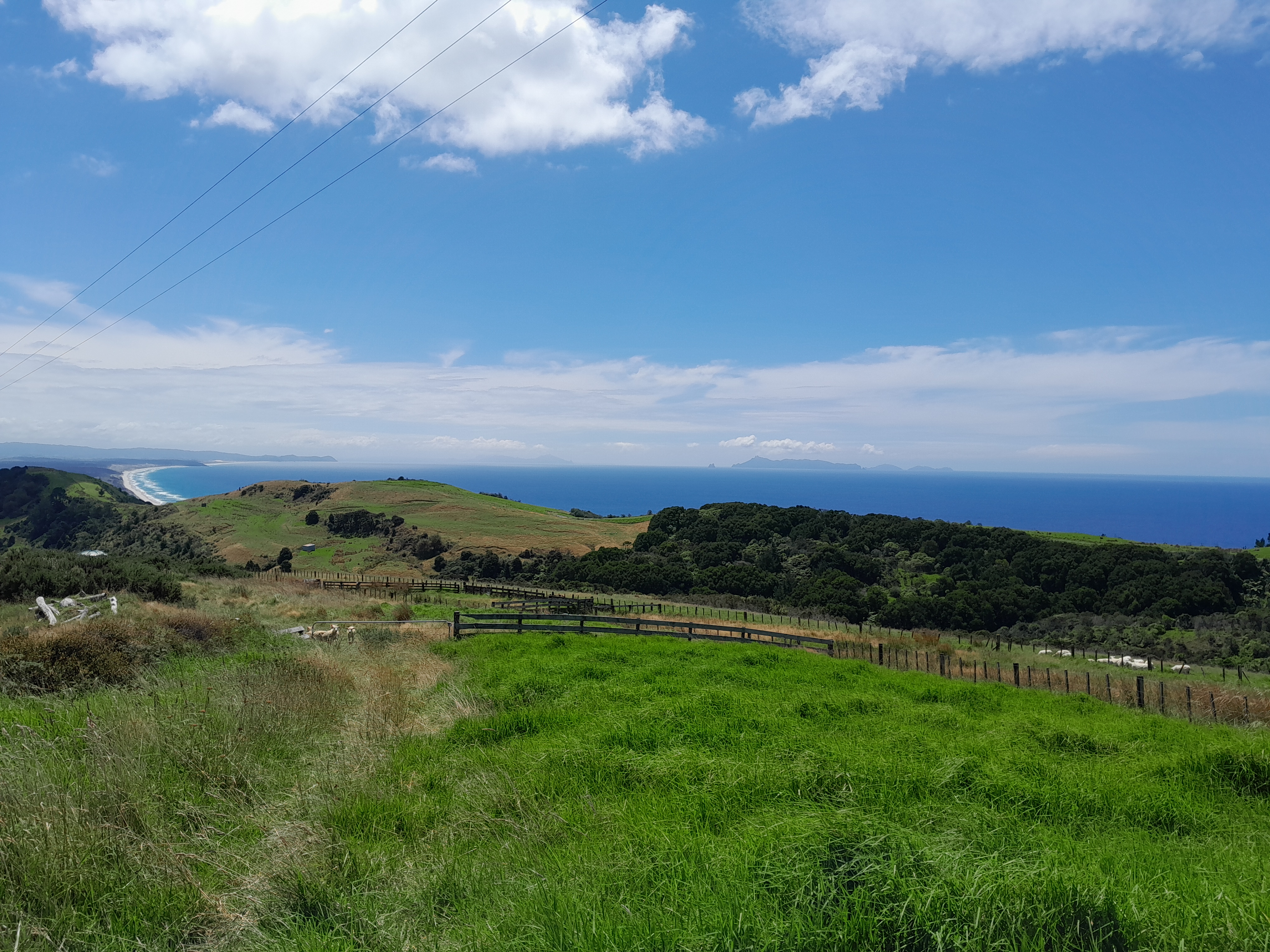
- Overlooking the park from its southwestern boundary. The dunes/beach can be seen in the distance on the left.

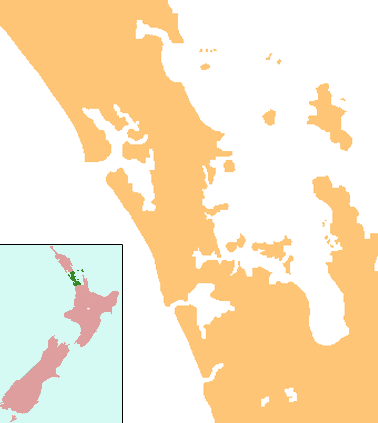
- Location within New Zealand Auckland
- Type: Auckland Regional Park
- Location: Rodney, Auckland, New Zealand
- Coordinates: 36.2604°S 174.7486°E
- Area: 251 ha (2.51 km²)
- Created: 2005
- Operator: Auckland Council
- Website: https://www.aucklandcouncil.govt.nz/en/parks-recreation/find-park-beach/park-detail/223.html

Pākiri Regional Park is a regional park located near Pākiri, north of Auckland in New Zealand's North Island. It is situated in Rodney in the Auckland Region, and is owned and operated by Auckland Council.

== Geography ==
A map of the park and surrounds, with future plans indicated

The park is located around 1.5 hours drive north of Auckland city and is near (to the north of) Leigh. It is a quiet, coastal regional park and provides public access to Pākiri beach, which is adjacent to the regional park. The land around the beach is a Department of Conservation bird breeding site, meaning that dogs are prohibited from the park. The beach itself is designated as an off-leash area, and was once a popular dog walking spot, but the prohibition on dogs in the park means that there is no way for dog owners to access the beach by land. Dog owners previously accessed the beach along the coast from the northwest side, however the adjacent land to the northwest of the park, the Taumata A and B blocks, is private land. This was clarified by new signs erected by Auckland Council in 2019, which also stated that dogs were prohibited through that area. The landowners of the adjacent land enacted a rāhui in 2023 to prevent public access to the beach so as to protect seafood, particularly mussel beds, located on the beach, making the regional park the only way to publicly access the beach. This led to concerns that the park was acting as a "backdoor" access and enabling the devastation of the mussel beds through people using the park to circumvent the rāhui.

Ngāti Manuhiri have an ancestral relationship with the Pākiri coastline and had settlements along the beach. The regional park contains cultural heritage sites that have significance to the iwi, including several pā sites. Other mana whenua also have associations with the coastal area that Pākiri Regional Park is part of.

== History ==
The land for the park was acquired as part of a strategy in 2005/2006 by the (now defunct) Auckland Regional Council to acquire more coastal parkland, as Auckland's growing population meant that it would be more costly to acquire coastal land in the future. A 52 ha block of land was purchased from former boxer David Tua for $10.25 million in December 2005, which had been at the centre of a legal battle between Tua and his former managers. The regional council also acquired the neighboring Arrigato property which, by February 2006, gave them a combined 178 ha of land from which to form the regional park. Subsequent smaller land acquisitions were made to add to the park.

=== Sand dredging ===
Since the 1940s, sand from Pākiri beach had been dredged for use in Auckland's concrete industry, by companies such as McCallum Brothers and Kaipara Limited.

However, in 2005, when the land for the park was purchased, dredging ceased due to concerns of the erosion caused.

A resource consent application in 2022 to continue dredging was rejected by Auckland Council. In 2024, a sand mining company appealed to continue dredging the coastline. This was overruled by the Environment Court under grounds that evidence could not be shown that sand mining was not having an harmful impact.

== Park development and facilities ==
The land for the park was purchased early so as to protect it and have it available for future generations, and was not expected to experience park development until at least 2015. As of 2022, the park encompasses 251 ha of coastal land and is still largely undeveloped. Vehicle access into the regional park is severely limited, and currently consists of a small parking bay at the end of M Greenwood Road, which provides pedestrian access into the rest of the park. Auckland Council has proposed for the park to be developed through the creation of an arrival area at the current M Greenwood Road site, along with another arrival area at the northern end of the park which would include park facilities such as parking, toilets, and visitor information.

The park land was initially leased for grazing, but has had a revegation and pest control programme ongoing since acquisition, with further efforts planned for restoration of the natural environment.

== Natural environment and ecology ==
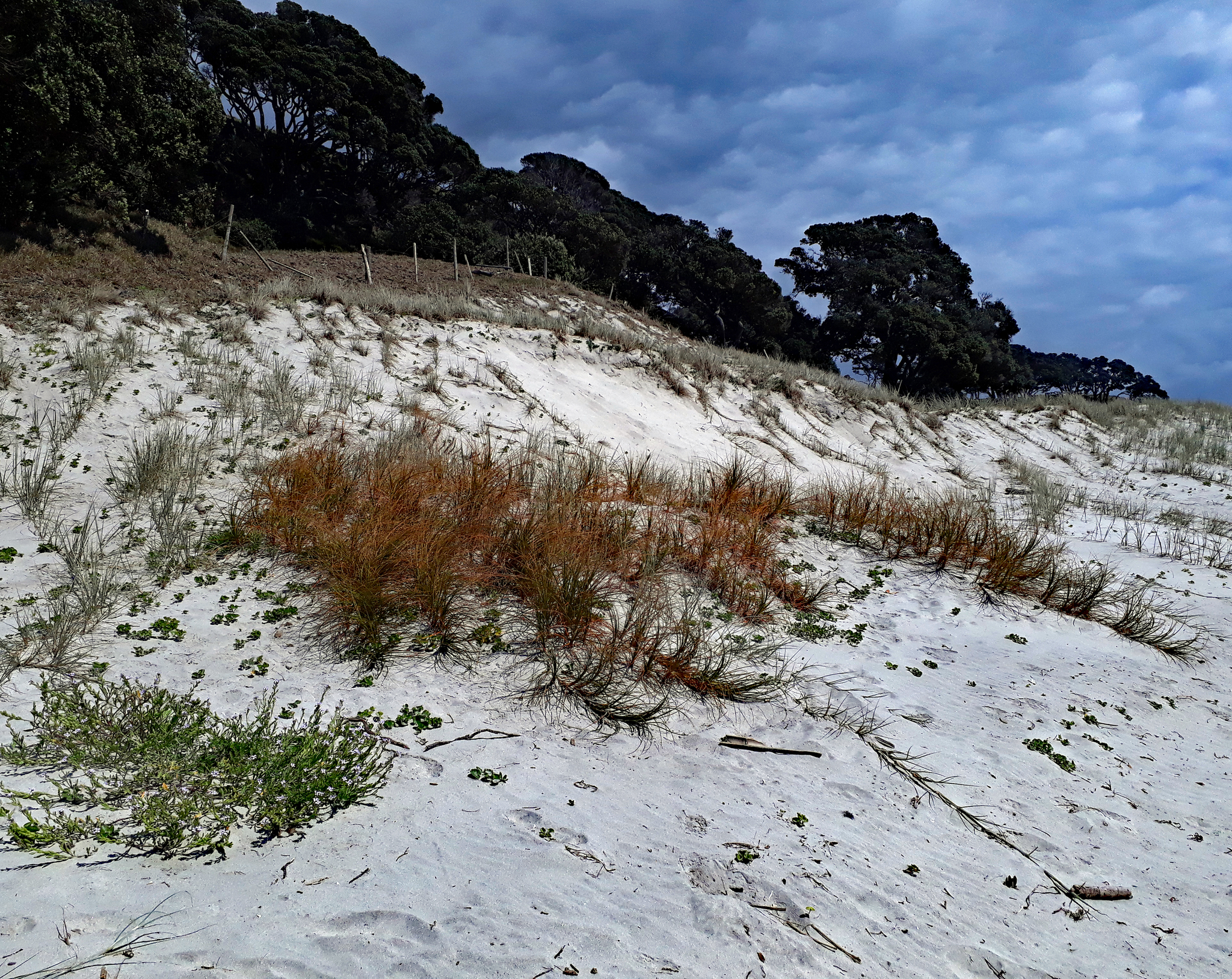
Pingao in the dunes at Pākiri Regional Park

The park is notable because of its beach and sand dunes which are of geological significance in the Auckland Region, and include a habitat for dotterels and fairy terns, along with the only protected population of Sand Tussock on the mainland of the region. Other flora found in the dunes includes Pingao, Spinifex, Pōhuehue, and Shore Bindweed.

Auckland Council identifies the following indigenous ecosystems as being present within the park, according to its classification system:

Name	Code	Threat status	Type	External link
Kauri, podocarp broadleaved forest	WF11	Endangered	Forest ecosystem	
Pōhutukawa, pūriri broadleaved forest	WF4	Endangered	Forest ecosystem	
Spinifex, pīngao grassland or sedgeland	DN2	Endangered	Dune ecosystem	
Pōhutukawa treeland, flaxland and rockland	CL1	Vulnerable	Cliff ecosystem	
Machaerina sedgeland ecosystem	WL11	Critically endangered	Wetland ecosystem	

Regionally endangered shrub Myrsine divaricata is found in the park, along with regionally critical plants, Tetragonia tetragonioides and Sonchus kirki.
