= Waharau Regional Park =

Regional park in New Zealand

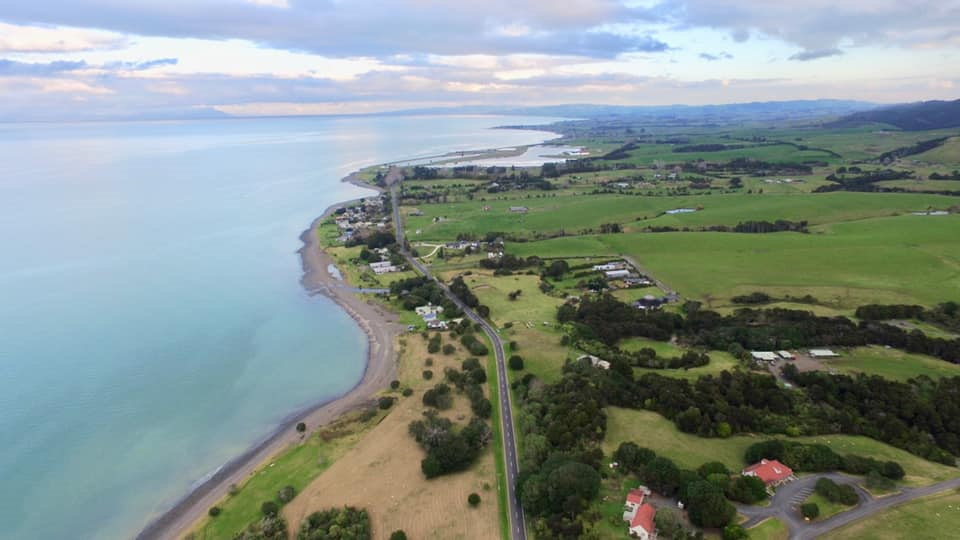
- Waharau Regional Park (foreground), with trees, camping areas and information centre (red roof)

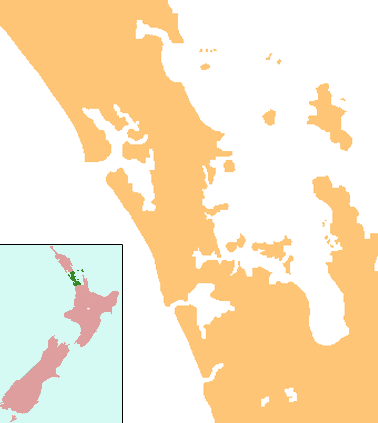
- Location within New Zealand Auckland
- Location: Hauraki District, Waikato Region, New Zealand
- Coordinates: 37.04°S 175.29°E
- Area: 170 ha (420 acres)
- Operator: Auckland Council

Waharau Regional Park is a regional park situated in the Hauraki District and the Waikato Region of New Zealand's North Island, four kilometres north of Whakatīwai Regional Park. It is just south of the border with the Auckland Region, and is owned and operated by Auckland Council. It runs from the eastern side of the Hunua Ranges, where it adjoins Hunua Ranges Regional Park, down to the Firth of Thames coast.

== History ==
The southern edge of the park is Waihihi Bay, which was a landing site of the Tainui migratory waka. Settled for a prolonged period during the pre-colonial era, Waharau was renowned for known for its paper mulberry (aute) and karaka groves. Since the 17th century, Waharau has been settled by the Ngāti Puku hapū of Ngāti Whanaunga.

From the 1860s, the area was a site of kauri tree logging by early European settlers.

The area was purchased by the Auckland Regional Authority between 1970 and 1973, in order to provide vehicle access to the eastern water catchment of the Hunua Ranges. It was later developed into a regional park, and opened by Te Atairangikaahu, the Māori queen, in 1979.
