= Waitawa Regional Park =

Protected area in New Zealand

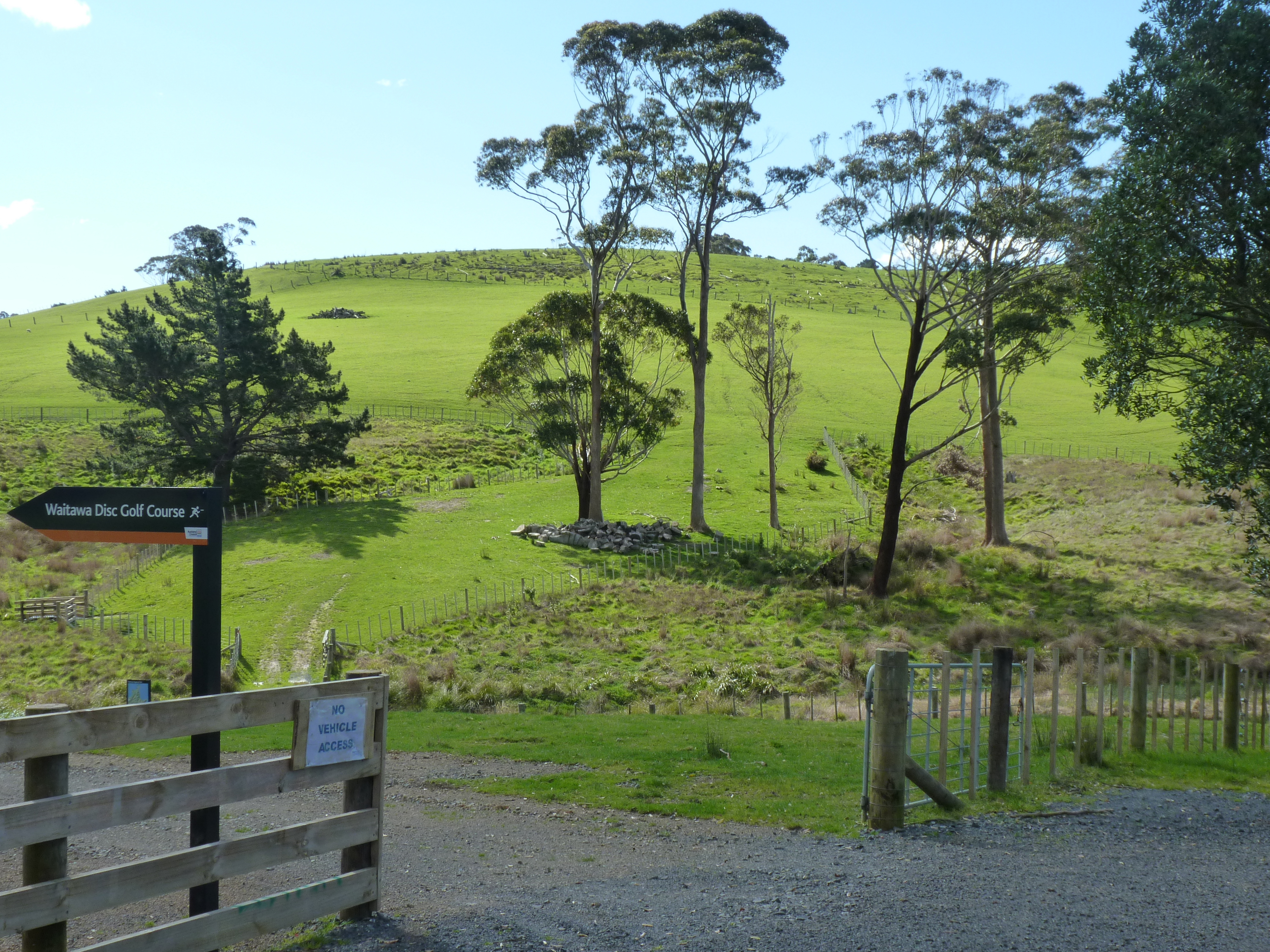

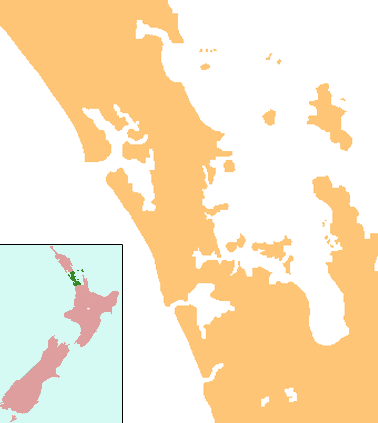
- Location within New Zealand Auckland
- Type: Regional park
- Location: Franklin, Auckland, New Zealand
- Coordinates: 36.936°S 175.143°E
- Area: 188 hectares (460 acres)
- Created: 2013
- Operator: Auckland Council
- Open: Daylight saving: 6am-9pm Non-daylight saving: 6am-7pm Pedestrian access: 24 hours

Waitawa Regional Park is a regional park situated on the coast of Tāmaki Strait, east of Auckland, New Zealand. It is located in Franklin in the Auckland Region, near Kawakawa Bay and Clevedon, about 50 kilometres (31 mi) from central Auckland.

The park was one of Auckland's first recreational parks, designed specifically for active recreational activities such as mountain biking, horse riding, kayaking and disc golf. One of the beaches is part of the Te Ara Moana Kayak Trail, while another will be a home base for marine education.

== History ==
Prior to becoming a regional park, the land was used as a dynamite factory by Orica Explosives. A commercial wharf and ablutions building from this era remain. Much of the land was previously worked as farmland.

The land was purchased in 2004 by the former Auckland Regional Council and has been managed as a regional park by Auckland Council since 2014.

== See also ==
- Regional parks of New Zealand
