= Glenfern Sanctuary Regional Park =

Regional park on Great Barrier Island, New Zealand

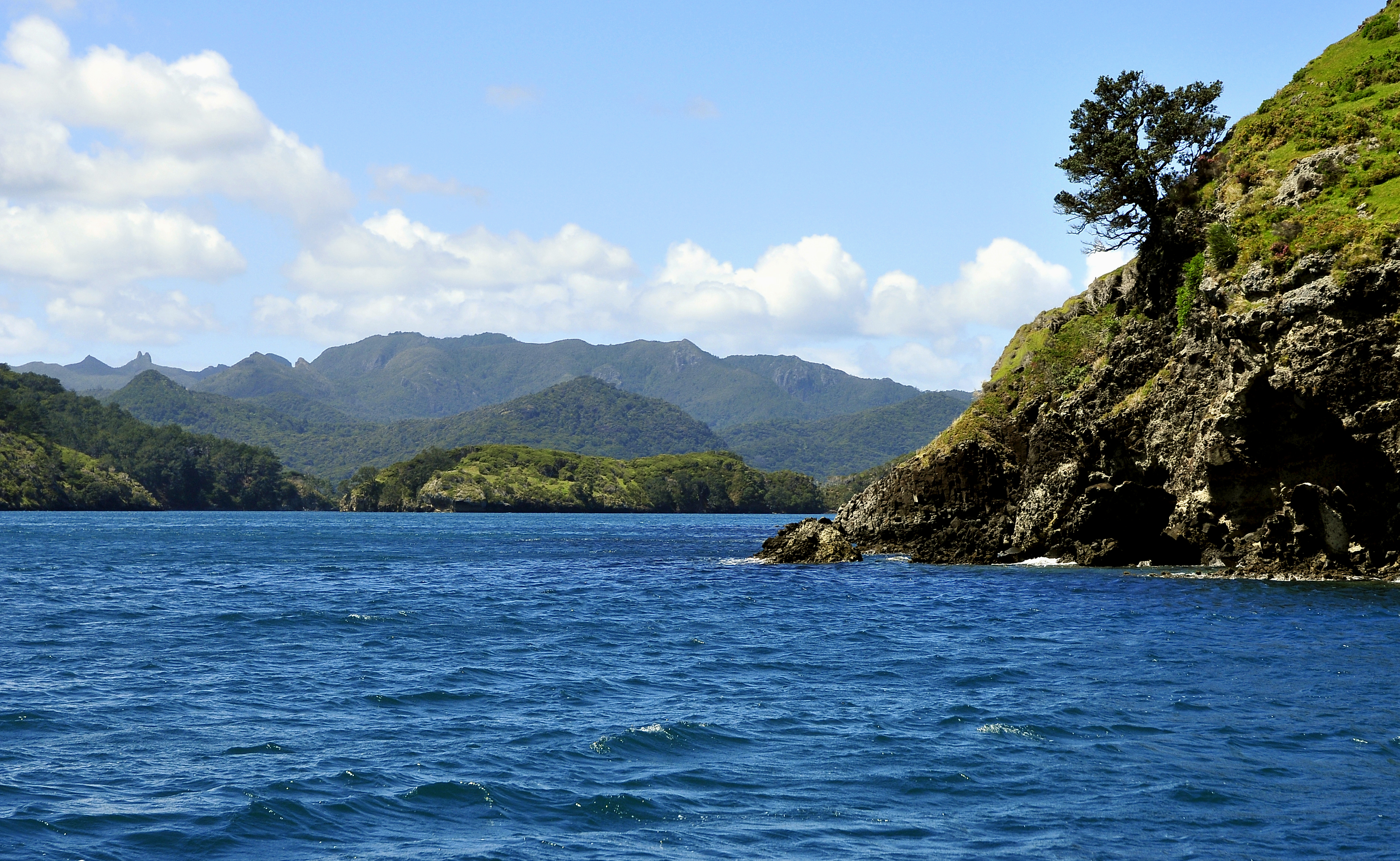
- Port Fitzroy coastline

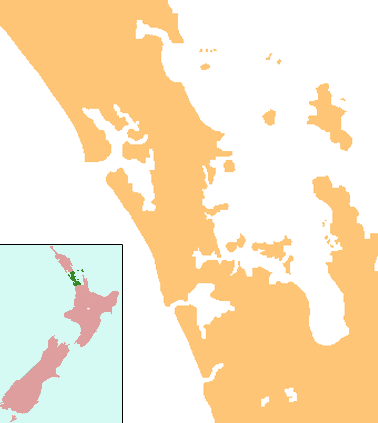
- Location within New Zealand Auckland
- Location: Great Barrier Island, Auckland, New Zealand
- Coordinates: 36.1609°S 175.3578°E
- Area: 83 hectares (210 acres)
- Created: 2016
- Operator: Auckland Council

Glenfern Sanctuary Regional Park is a regional park situated near Port Fitzroy on Great Barrier Island in New Zealand's Hauraki Gulf.

== Geography ==
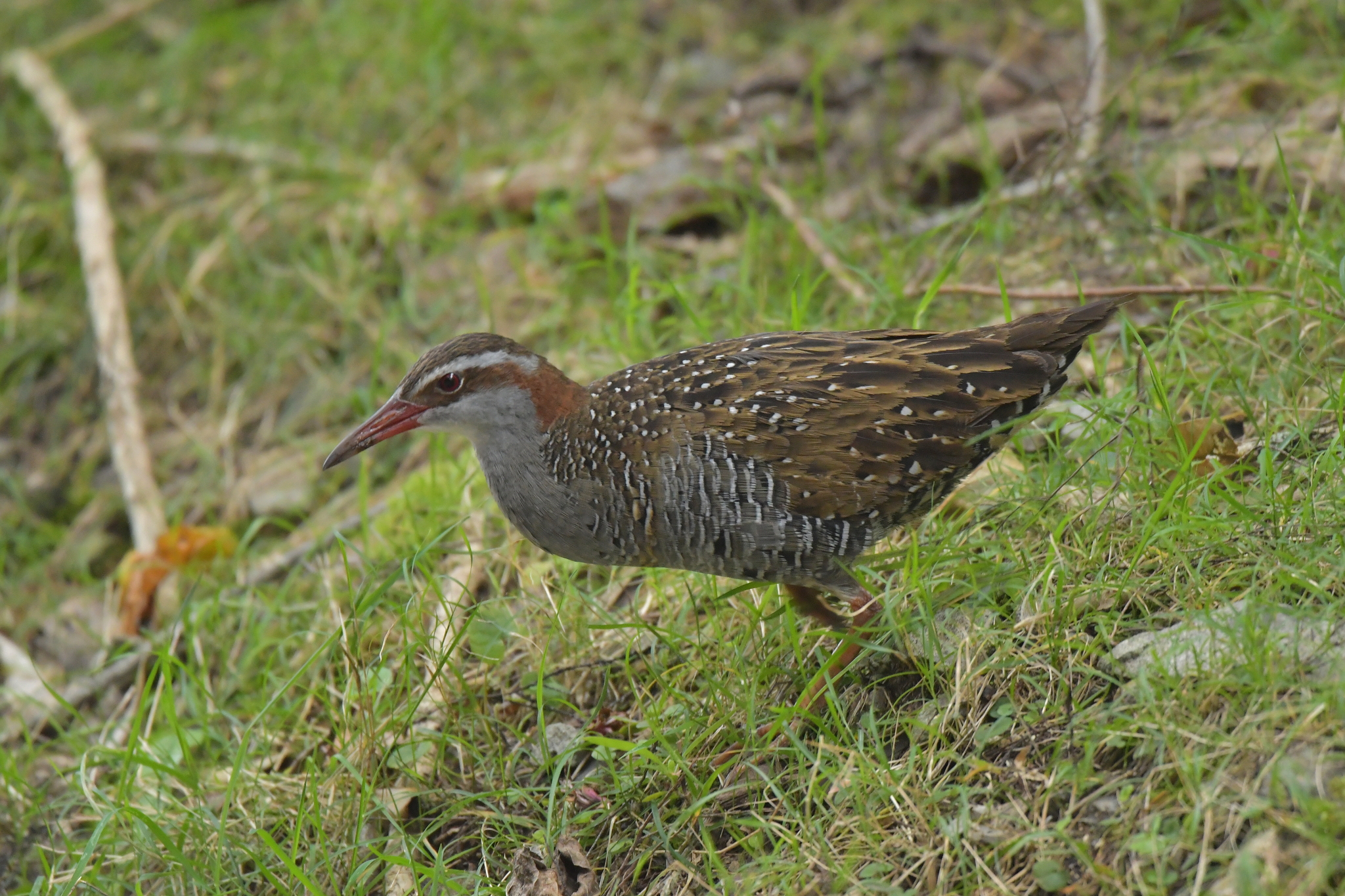
Banded rail (moho-pererū) at Glenfern Sanctuary Regional Park

Glenfern Sanctuary Regional Park is located on the Kotuku Peninsula of Great Barrier Island, on the northern shores of Rarohara Bay / Ungunu Bay. The northwest margin of the regional park is a 205 metres (673 ft) hill known as Tree Peak. Kotuku Point Scenic Reserve is adjacent to Glenfern Sanctuary Regional Park. The entire Kotuku Peninsula is protected by a predatory-free fence.

While much of the regional park is mānuka and kānuka-dominated scrubland, areas of remnant podocarp forest remain, including large pūriri trees, and a kauri tree estimated to be approximately 600 years old.

Many native species not found on the mainland can be found at Glenfern Sanctuary Regional Park, including the chevron skink (niho taniwha), the black petrel (tāiko), Cook's petrel (tītī), the brown teal (pāteke), banded rail (moho-pererū) and kākā parrots.

== History ==
The Glenfern Sanctuary Regional Park was historically named Rarohara by Ngāti Rehua / Ngātiwai ancestor Turi in the 14th century. The wider Te Whaanga o Rarohara / Port Fitzroy area was cultivated by Māori, and archaeological remains of pā, kāinga can be found in the area. Archaeological remains of stone gardens (māra) are found within Glenfern Sanctuary Regional Park.

In 1901, the historic Fitzroy House was constructed on the land. During World War II, a military hospital was established here.

Glenfern Sanctuary was established in 1992 by Tony Bouzaid, who redeveloped the property into a wildlife sanctuary. In 2008, Bouzaid constructed a 2 kilometres (1.2 mi) predator fence across the Kotuku Peninsula. After an aerial eradication programme in 2009, the peninsula became predator free.

After Bouzaid died in 2011, the property was listed Glenfern Sanctuary for sale in 2013, with the family hoping to find a new owner who shared Bouzaid's conservationist values. In April 2015, Minister of Conservation Maggie Barry announced that the Department of Conservation's Nature Heritage Fund, would put funds towards a consortium purchasing the land, that included Auckland Council and the Department of Conservation. In mid-2016, the land was finally purchased by the Auckland Council, who designated it as a regional park.

== Recreation ==
Walking and guided tours are popular activities for visitors to Glenfern Sanctuary Regional Park. A 2 kilometres (1.2 mi) walking track can be found in the regional park, which includes a swing bridge that allows access to the canopy of a 600 year old kauri.
