= Te Ārai Regional Park =

Protected area in New Zealand

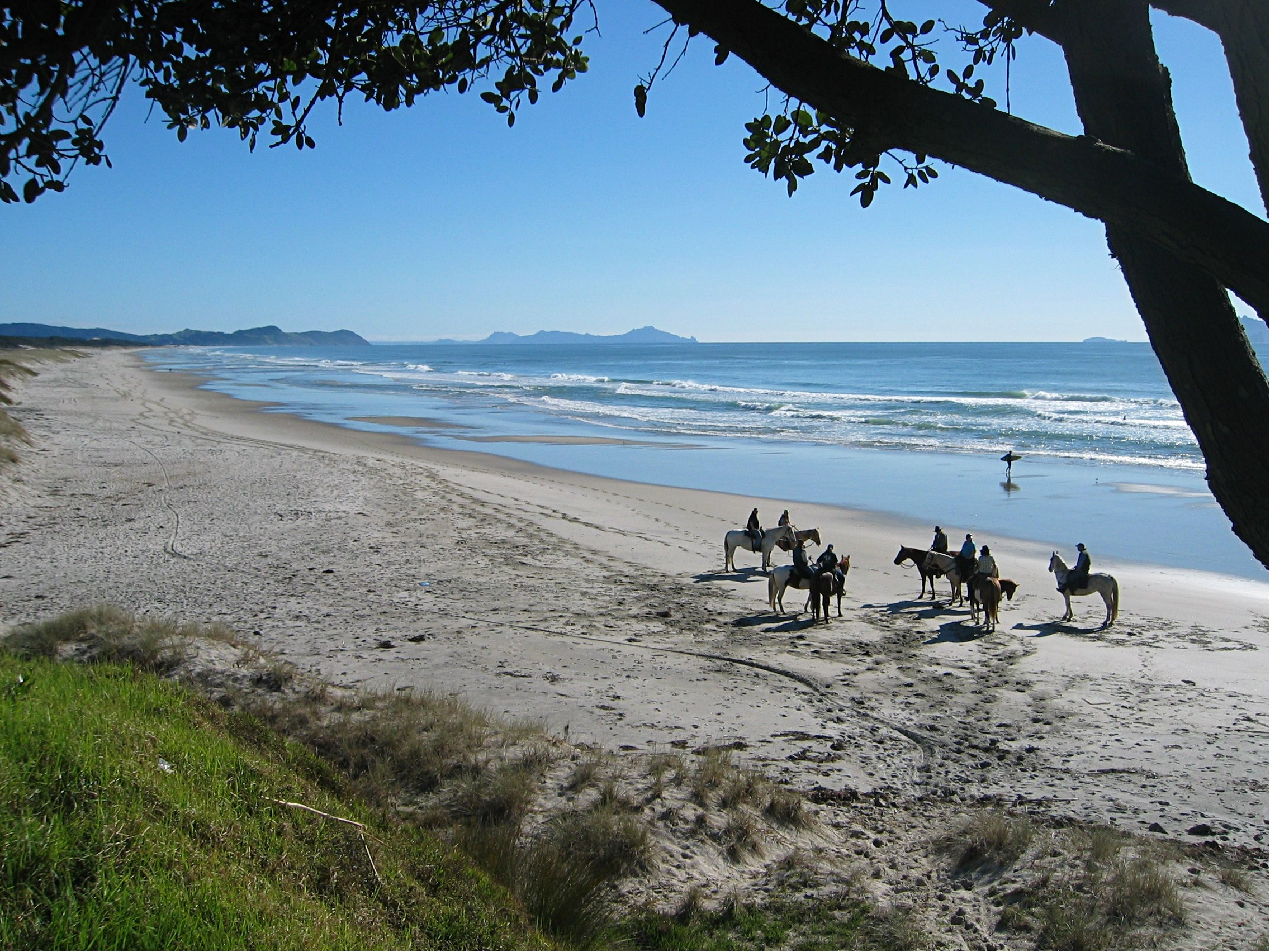

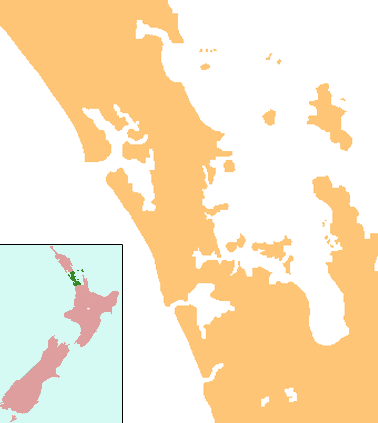
- Location within New Zealand Auckland
- Location: Rodney, Auckland, New Zealand
- Coordinates: 36.160°S 174.646°E
- Operator: Auckland Council

Te Ārai Regional Park is a regional park situated in the Auckland Region of New Zealand's North Island. It is owned and operated by Auckland Council.

== Geography ==
Te Ārai Regional Park has the largest number of sand dunes in the Auckland Region. The park is a long stretch of coastline in Rodney, between the most northern point of the Auckland Region on the North Island and the Poutawa Stream. The park is bordered by the Mangawhai Forest.

An 85 metre high headland also known as Te Arai is found in the park.

== Biodiversity ==
The Te Ārai sand dunes are a regionally significant biodiversity area, adjoining the Pākiri Dunes biodiversity focus area to the south. The park is one of the few remaining breeding areas for the New Zealand fairy tern. The endangered katipō spider is found in the regional park. The spiders that live in the regional park are typically black in colour, and do not have the distinctive red markings typically seen on katipō.

== History ==
During the 1930s, pine trees were planted in the area to stabilise the dunes. Originally just 50 hectares in size when it was purchased by the Auckland Regional Council in 2008, the park grew to 250 hectares in 2014 after Te Uri-o-Hau gifted land to be incorporated into the regional park. The park grew again when Ngāti Manuhiri vested 154 hectares of coastal land to the park, extending it as far south as the Poutawa Stream.

== Recreation ==
The park is a popular destination for surfers. The Te Araroa trail traverses the regional park.
