= Orere Point Regional Park =

Regional park in New Zealand

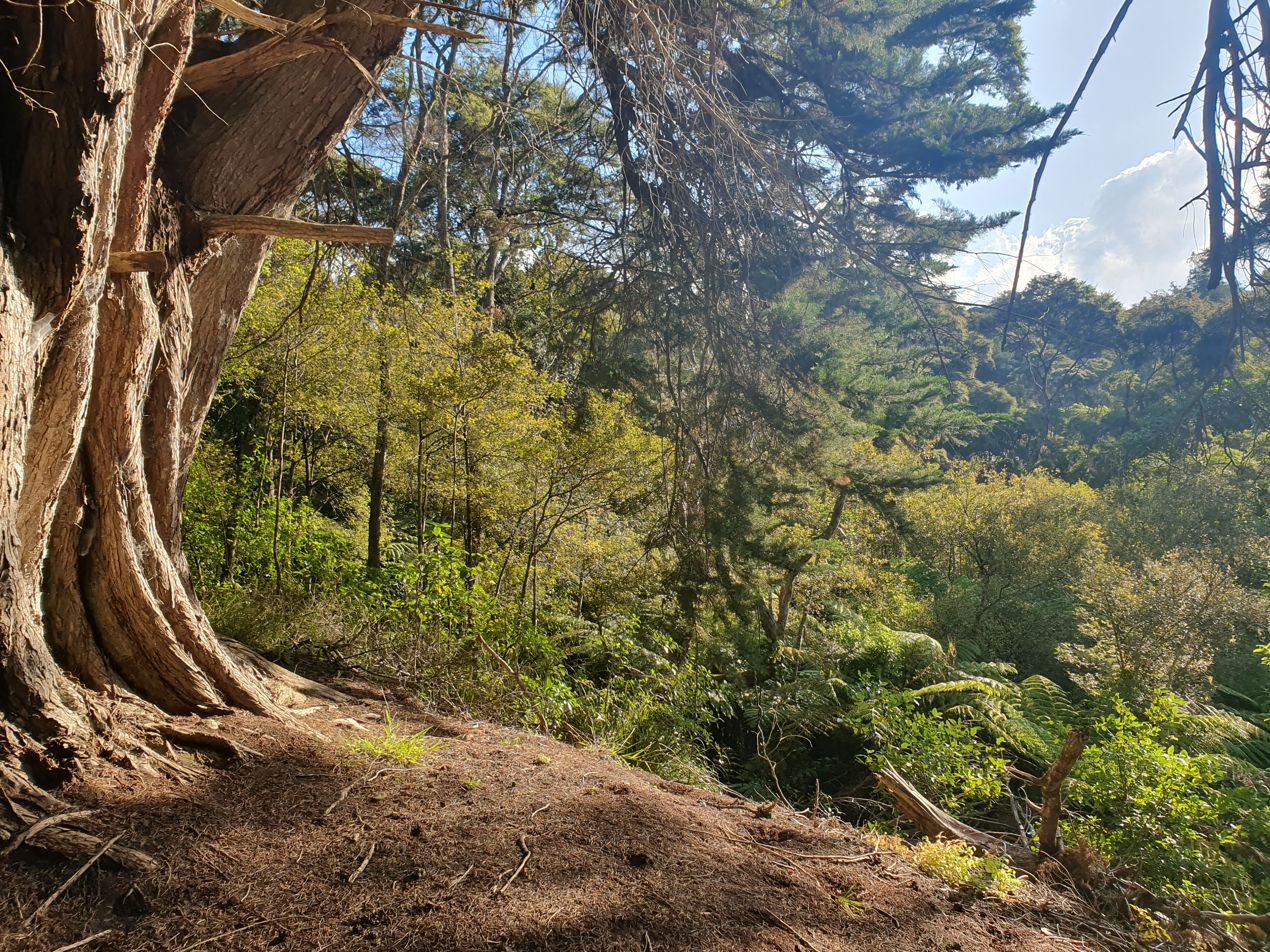

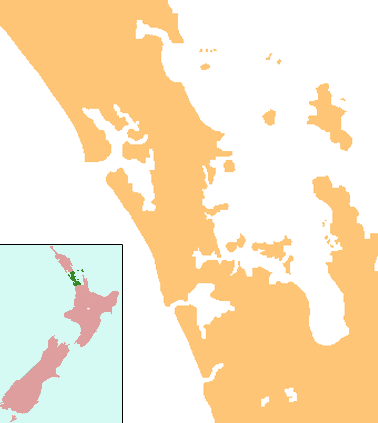
- Location within New Zealand Auckland
- Location: Franklin, Auckland, New Zealand
- Coordinates: 36.9555°S 175.2310°E
- Operator: Auckland Council

Orere Point Regional Park is a regional park situated south-east of Auckland in New Zealand's North Island. It is owned and operated by Auckland Council. It is located in Ōrere Point in Franklin, in the Auckland Region.
