= Auckland Council =

Governing body of New Zealand's Auckland Region

Coordinates: 36°51′S 174°47′E

Auckland Council Te Kaunihera o Tāmaki Makaurau
- Brand logo

Type
- Type: Unitary authority of Auckland Region
- Term limits: None

History
- Established: 1 November 2010; 16 years ago
- Preceded by: List: Auckland City Council; Rodney District Council; North Shore City Council; Waitakere City Council; Manukau City Council; Franklin District Council; Papakura District Council; Auckland Regional Council
- New session started: 19 October 2025

Leadership
- Mayor: Wayne Brown, Fix AKL since 16 October 2022
- Deputy: Desley Simpson, Fix AKL since 24 October 2022
- CEO: Phil Wilson since 1 November 2023

Structure
- Seats: 21 (including mayor)
- Political groups: Independents (6); Labour (5); Fix Auckland (3); MPAT (2); City Vision (1); PPF (1); C&R (1); WestWards (1); Team Franklin (1)
- Length of term: 3 years, renewable

Elections
- Voting system: First-past-the-post
- First election: 9 October 2010
- Last election: 11 October 2025
- Next election: 14 October 2028

Meeting place
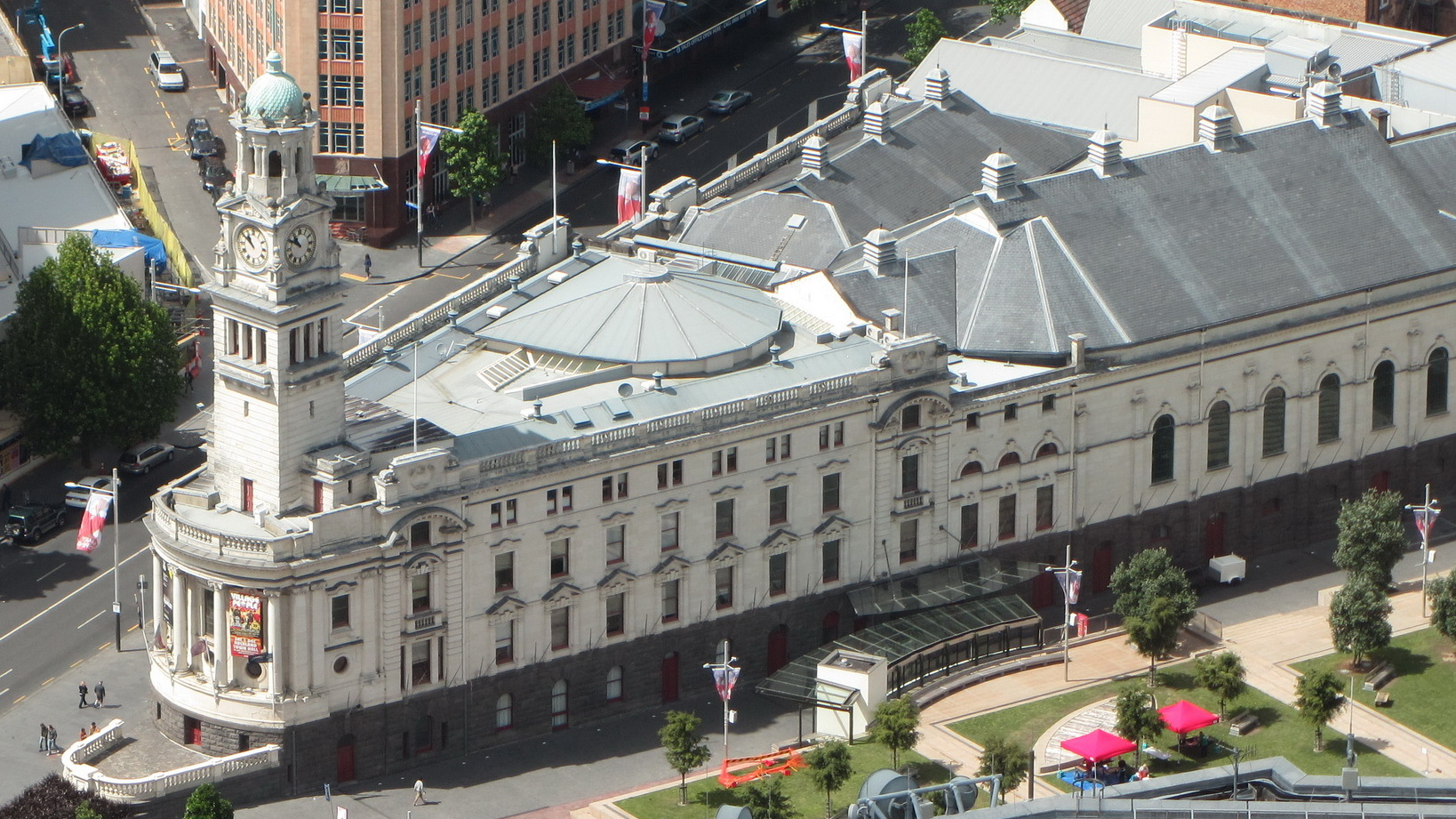
- Auckland Town Hall

Website
- www.aucklandcouncil.govt.nz

Auckland Council (Māori: Te Kaunihera o Tāmaki Makaurau) is the territorial authority for the Auckland Region of New Zealand. It serves as the local and regional government as a unitary authority. It has existed since the 2010 amalgamation of the seven territorial authorities and one regional council in the region. It administers the largest population of any local government authority in Oceania.

The governing body consists of a mayor and 20 councillors, elected from 13 wards. There are also 151 members of 21 local boards who make decisions on matters local to their communities.

The council was established by a number of Acts of Parliament, and an Auckland Transition Agency, also created by the central government. Both the means by which the council was established and its structure came under repeated criticism from a broad spectrum during the establishment period.

== History ==
=== Predecessors ===
The Auckland Council took over the functions of the Auckland Regional Council and the region's seven city and district councils: Auckland City Council, Manukau City Council, Waitakere City Council, North Shore City Council, Papakura District Council, Rodney District Council and most of Franklin District Council.

The Auckland Regional Council was formed in 1989, replacing the Auckland Regional Authority. One of the mainstays of its work was expanding the parks network, and it brought into the Auckland Council 26 regional parks with more than 40,000 hectares, including many restored natural habitats and sanctuaries developed in co-operation with the Department of Conservation and volunteers. A variety of often public transport-focused projects like the Northern Busway as well as significant rail and public transport investments were realised through the Auckland Regional Transport Authority, much of it supported by retaining Ports of Auckland in public hands (after the deregulation of the Auckland Harbour Board) to fund the improvements with the dividends.

=== Royal Commission ===
Until 2010, the Auckland Region had seven "City/District" authorities, plus one "Regional" authority. In the late 2000s, New Zealand's central government and parts of Auckland's society felt that this large number of Councils, and the lack of strong regional government (with the Auckland Regional Council only having limited powers) were hindering Auckland's progress, and that a form of stronger regional government, or an amalgamation under one local council, would be beneficial. Others pointed to the fact that a previous integration of the many much smaller Borough Councils did not bring the promised advantages either, and reduced local participation in politics, with editorialists pointing out that the (supposedly mainly Wellingtonian) proponents of the 'super city' have carefully not made any promises of savings in light of past rises in rates and utilities bills.

In 2007, the government set up a Royal Commission on Auckland Governance to report on what restructuring should be done. The report was released on 27 March 2009 and the government subsequently announced that a "super city" would be set up to include the full metropolitan area under an Auckland Council with a single mayor and 20–30 local boards, by the time of the local body elections in 2010, though it also changed some key recommendations of the Royal Commission.

The council was set up by three pieces of legislation, the Local Government (Tamaki Makaurau Reorganisation) Act 2009, the Local Government (Auckland Council) Act 2009 and the Local Government (Auckland Transitional Provisions) Act 2010.

=== Withdrawal from Local Government New Zealand ===
On 23 March 2023, the Auckland Council voted by a margin of ten to ten to leave Local Government New Zealand (LGNZ), the national representative body for local councils in New Zealand. Mayor Brown used his casting vote to break the deadlock during the Council's vote. Brown said that members of the body got drunk regularly during conference meetings and that the Auckland Council could negotiate with the New Zealand Government independently. Brown also said that exiting the LGNZ would save the Auckland Council NZ$640,000 a year, helping to reduce its debt. The Auckland Council's decision to leave LGNZ was criticised as detrimental to Auckland ratepayers and cooperation with other local councils by fellow councillors Richard Hills, Andy Baker, Julie Fairey, and LGNZ President Stuart Crosby.

== Governance ==
=== Governing body ===
The governing body of the Auckland Council consists of the mayor and councillors. Decision-making for the governing body's areas of oversight is done by committees, a few of which consist of the whole governing body, and most of which consist of a chairperson appointed by the mayor and a subset of the governing body members.

==== Mayor ====
The mayor of Auckland is the directly elected chair of the governing body of Auckland Council.

==== Current composition ====
The following council took office following the October 2025 election:

Role	Portrait	Name	Affiliation	Ward
Mayor		Wayne Brown	Fix Auckland	Elected at-large
Deputy Mayor		Desley Simpson	Fix Auckland	Orākei
Councillor		Andy Baker	Team Franklin	Franklin
Councillor		Josephine Bartley	Labour	Maungakiekie-Tāmaki
Councillor		Bo Burns	Independent	Howick
Councillor		Julie Fairey	City Vision	Albert-Eden-Puketāpapa
Councillor		Alf Filipaina	Labour	Manukau
Councillor		Christine Fletcher	Communities and Residents	Albert-Eden-Puketāpapa
Councillor		Lotu Fuli	Labour	Manukau
Councillor		John Gillon	Putting the North Shore First	North Shore
Councillor		Shane Henderson	Labour	Waitākere
Councillor		Richard Hills	Positive Leadership for the Shore	North Shore
Councillor		Mike Lee	Auckland Independents	Waitematā and Gulf
Councillor		Daniel Newman	Manurewa-Papakura Action Team	Manurewa-Papakura
Councillor		Sarah Paterson-Hamlin	Labour	Whau
Councillor		Greg Sayers	Independent	Rodney
Councillor		Victoria Short	Fix Auckland	Albany
Councillor		Ken Turner	WestWards	Waitākere
Councillor		John Watson	Putting People First	Albany
Councillor		Maurice Williamson	Independent	Howick
Councillor		Matt Winiata	Manurewa-Papakura Action Team	Manurewa-Papakura

==== List of members by term ====
Term		Mayor	Councillors	Ref.
1st	2010–2013	Len Brown	Arthur Anae; Cameron Brewer; Cathy Casey (CV); Sandra Coney (BftW); Alf Filipaina (L); Christine Fletcher (C&R); Michael Goudie; Ann Hartley (SV); Penny Hulse; Mike Lee; Des Morrison (C&R); Richard Northey (L); Calum Penrose (MPFA); Noelene Mary Raffills (C&R); Jami-Lee Ross^{R} (C&R); Sharon Stewart; John Walker; Wayne Walker (PPF); Penny Webster; George Wood (C&R); Dick Quax^{by} (C&R)	
2nd	2013–2016	Len Brown	Arthur Anae; Cathy Casey (CV); Cameron Brewer; Bill Cashmore (C&R); Ross Clow (L); Linda Cooper; Chris Darby; Alf Filipaina (L); Christine Fletcher (C&R); Penny Hulse; Denise Krum (C&R); Mike Lee; Calum Penrose (IMP); Dick Quax; Sharon Stewart; John Walker (IMP); Wayne Walker (PPF); John Watson (PPF); Penny Webster; George Wood (FDFS)	
3rd	2016–2019	Phil Goff	Cathy Casey (CV); Bill Cashmore (TF); Ross Clow (L); Efeso Collins (L); Linda Cooper; Chris Darby; Alf Filipaina (L); Christine Fletcher (C&R); Richard Hills; Penny Hulse; Denise Lee (AF)^{R}; Mike Lee; Daniel Newman (MPAT); Greg Sayers; Desley Simpson (C&R); Sharon Stewart; Dick Quax^{†}; John Walker; Wayne Walker (PPF); John Watson (PPF); Josephine Bartley^{by} (L); Paul Young^{by}	
4th	2019–2022	Phil Goff	Josephine Bartley (L); Cathy Casey (CV); Bill Cashmore (TF); Efeso Collins (L); Pippa Coom (CV); Linda Cooper; Angela Dalton (MPAT); Chris Darby; Alf Filipaina (L); Christine Fletcher (C&R); Shane Henderson (L); Richard Hills; Tracy Mulholland (C&R); Daniel Newman (MPAT); Greg Sayers; Desley Simpson (C&R); Sharon Stewart; Wayne Walker (PPF); John Watson (PPF); Paul Young	
5th	2022–2025	Wayne Brown (Ind. / Fix Auckland)	Andy Baker (TF); Josephine Bartley (L); Angela Dalton; Chris Darby; Julie Fairey (CV); Alf Filipaina (L); Christine Fletcher (C&R); Lotu Fuli (L); Shane Henderson (L); Richard Hills; Mike Lee; Kerrin Leoni (L); Daniel Newman (MPAT); Greg Sayers; Desley Simpson (C&R / Ind.); Sharon Stewart; Ken Turney (WW); Wayne Walker (PPF); John Watson (PPF); Maurice Williamson	
6th	2025–2028	Wayne Brown (Ind. / Fix Auckland)	Andy Baker (TF); Josephine Bartley (L); Bo Burns; Julie Fairey (CV); Alf Filipaina (L); Christine Fletcher (C&R); Lotu Fuli (L); John Gillon; Shane Henderson (L); Richard Hills; Mike Lee; Daniel Newman (MPAT); Sarah Paterson-Hamlin (L); Greg Sayers; Victoria Short (FA); Desley Simpson (FA); Ken Turner (WW); John Watson (PPF); Maurice Williamson; Matt Winiata (MPAT)	
^{R} resigned during term; ^{†} died during term; ^{by} elected at by-election

=== Local boards ===
Local boards
- Number: 21 (as of 2026)

Local boards are sub-regional local government entities that provide governance at the local level in the Auckland Region. Their responsibilities include managing events and community facilities such as libraries and local parks. They have the power to develop local by-laws or propose local targeted rates which they put forward to the Governing Body to adopt.

Local board	Pop. (Note: Circa 2025)	Control (Note: Per 2025 Auckland local board elections unless stated otherwise)	Members
Hibiscus and Bays	121,100	No majority	8
Upper Harbour	84,500	Living Upper Harbour	6
Albert-Eden	102,900	City Vision	8
Puketāpapa	63,200	C&R	6
Franklin	89,900	Team Franklin	9
Howick	173,200	No majority	11
Māngere-Ōtāhuhu	85,900	Labour	7
Ōtara-Papatoetoe	98,900	Labour (Note: Per 2026 Ōtara-Papatoetoe Local Board by-election)	7
Manurewa	110,400	MPAT	8
Papakura	84,200	MPAT	6
Maungakiekie-Tāmaki	88,100	C&R	7
Devonport-Takapuna	61,100	No majority	6
Kaipātiki	95,600	Shore Action	8
Ōrākei	86,800	C&R	7
Rodney	83,400	No majority	9
Henderson-Massey	139,200	Labour	8
Waitākere Ranges	56,900	Future West	5
Aotea / Great Barrier	1,250	No majority	5
Waiheke	9,360	No majority	5
Waitematā	88,900	City Vision	7
Whau	91,300	Labour	7

=== Independent Māori Statutory Board ===
In mid-June 2026, the populist New Zealand First party announced it would campaign during the 2026 New Zealand general election on disestablishing the Independent Māori Statutory Board as part of its campaign against co-governance.

== Operations ==
The council tower (centre) next to the Sky Tower, with repair work taking place on the exterior of the upper levels

When it was formed in 2010 the council owned approximately $34 billion of assets, including over 100,000 hectares of open space, parks and reserves, as well as the large transport assets administered by Auckland Transport. As of 2026, the value of all assets owned by the council group (including CCOs) is $86.5 billion.

Auckland Council Investments Limited (ACIL), the CCO responsible for non-transport investment assets, manages Council investments worth $2.54 billion, including a 22.4% stake in Auckland Airport worth $1.13 billion, as well as a 100% share of Ports of Auckland Limited worth $1.08 billion, and Auckland Film Studios, worth $8 million (values at May 2014).

The council's headquarters is a 29 storey office tower located at 135 Albert Street with capacity for 2400 staff, 299 carparks for council vehicles, and approximately 33,000 square meters of office space. The building was formerly the ASB Bank headquarters and was purchased by the council for $104 million in 2012 as a way of reducing its corporate footprint by consolidating the offices of the legacy councils it replaced into a small number of hubs. This included 705 staff who were relocated from the former North Shore City Council office in Takapuna. By 2016, problems with the granite cladding had been identified that would require $27 million in repair work, however the estimated value of the building had also increased to $250 million. In 2026, the council took out a lease at adjacent 99 Albert Street to enable transport staff inherited from Auckland Transport, as well as the CCO itself, to relocate closer to the headquarters.

The council's Albany Hub

In 2023, as a further measure to consolidate its corporate footprint, the council established a new Albany hub serving north and west Auckland, and downsize its offices in Takapuna, Henderson, and Orewa. In 2019, the council had entered into an agreement to lease 63% of a six-level building from developer Asset Plus, who developed the building to serve as the council's Albany hub.

=== Chief executive ===
Chief executive of Auckland Council
- Incumbent; Phil Wilson since 6 November 2023
- Inaugural holder: Doug McKay
- Formation: 1 November 2010; 16 years ago
- Salary: $628,200
- Website: www.aucklandcouncil.govt.nz

Doug McKay was announced as the inaugural chief executive officer of the council, being selected ahead of 27 others. He had no direct experience in local government, but had strong ties to Auckland; he had 30 years of experience as a corporate executive. He was to receive a salary of $675,000 and an incentive bonus of $67,500.

Stephen Town became chief executive on 15 January 2014. In early February 2020, Town announced he would not see out his term that was set to finish in December 2020, instead moving to the New Zealand Institute of Skills & Technology in early July.

Chief executives of Auckland Council
No.	Chief executive	Portrait	Term start	Term end	Ref
1	Doug McKay		1 November 2010	31 December 2013	
–	vacant		1 January 2013	14 January 2014	
2	Stephen Town		15 January 2014	25 June 2020	
–	Patricia Reade		25 June 2020	31 August 2020	
3	Jim Stabback		1 September 2020	2 July 2023	
–	Phil Wilson		3 July 2023	5 November 2023	
4	Phil Wilson		6 November 2023	incumbent	

=== Transport ===
On 1 October 2026, as part of major transport reforms, the council absorbed most local government transport functions for the Auckland Region from Auckland Transport, which was repurposed to solely focus on the delivery of public transport. The council became the Road Controlling Authority and took on the responsibility for managing all roads in Auckland apart from State Highways (including motorways) which remain under the purview of the New Zealand Transport Agency. Under the reforms, roads are classified into several categories, with the Governing Body making decisions about arterial roads and roads in the Eden Park precinct, while local boards make decisions about local and collector roads. In addition to roads, the council also took responsibility for walking, cycling, parking, maritime safety, and transport planning.

=== Libraries ===
Central Library

The council runs a network of public libraries with 57 branches, which it claims is the largest public library system in Australasia, and partners with 11 rural libraries that are run by community volunteers. The library system was formed by the amalgamation of the library systems of the seven councils that Auckland Council replaced, some of which dated back to the 19th century. Many library branches also serve as council service centres.

In 2021, the library system removed overdue fines and forgave pending historic fines with the intent to increase patronage, in line with similar moves at other library systems both nationally and internationally.

=== Regional parks ===
The council owns and manages 28 regional parks around the region. Most of the parks were inherited from Auckland Regional Council.

- Ambury Regional Park
- Ātiu Creek Regional Park
- Auckland Botanic Gardens
- Āwhitu Regional Park
- Duder Regional Park
- Glenfern Sanctuary Regional Park
- Hunua Ranges Regional Park
- Long Bay Regional Park
- Mahurangi Regional Park
- Motukorea Browns Island Regional Park
- Muriwai Regional Park
- Mutukaroa / Hamlins Hill Regional Park
- Ōmana Regional Park
- Orere Point Regional Park
- Pākiri Regional Park
- Scandrett Regional Park
- Shakespear Regional Park
- Tāpapakanga Regional Park
- Tāwharanui Regional Park
- Tawhitokino Regional Park
- Te Ārai Regional Park
- Te Rau Pūriri Regional Park
- Waharau Regional Park
- Waitākere Ranges Regional Park
- Waitawa Regional Park
- Wenderholm Regional Park
- Whakanewha Regional Park
- Whakatīwai Regional Park

=== Waste services ===
The council also manages the waste collection system in the Auckland Region.

In 2023, the council introduced food scraps bins to reduce food scraps going to landfill, funded by an annual fee of $77.20 per household. A year after the rollout began, the council reported a 10% decrease in kerbside rubbish going to landfill, equivalent to 40 million kilograms of food scraps. The bins received praise from some residents for reducing the amount of rubbish they were putting in their bins, particularly for those who did not have space for compost. However, other residents criticised the bins and did not use them, either due to not needing them or finding them difficult to use due to perceived issues with the bin liners disintegrating and the sturdiness of the bins.

In 2025, the council explored running a six-month trial of fortnightly rubbish collections in a small number of suburbs to investigate the possibility of a wider region-wide rollout as part of a waste minimisation strategy to reduce waste sent to landfill. The proposed trial received heavy criticism from some councilors, as well as members of the public, cumulating in the Policy, Planning, and Development Committee voting against proceeding with the trial and retaining weekly rubbish collections.

=== Emergency Management ===
The council is responsible for emergency management and civil defence in the region, in conjunction with the National Emergency Management Agency (NEMA) and emergency services, for which it has a dedicated child agency, Auckland Emergency Management. The agency operates a 24/7 duty team who monitor threats and coordinates responses. They also maintain three NEMA-accredited New Zealand Response Teams staffed by volunteers: NZRT3 (West Auckland), NZRT5 (North Shore), and NZRT23 (South Auckland) based in Henderson, Sunnynook, and Papakura respectively.

In 2023, the council's emergency management capabilities were strongly tested when it was heavily involved in the response to the Auckland Anniversary Weekend Floods and the Auckland impacts of Cyclone Gabrielle. A large amount of flood damage to property by the Anniversary Weekend floods and four people died. The council's response was criticised for a perceived lack of communication and preparedness, with the chair of the Emergency Management and Civil Defence Committee, councilor Sharon Stewart, particularly critical of how late she found out about the event. A review by Mike Bush following the events found that the council was underprepared to respond to a major storm. A later review in 2024 by the Auditor General found that the council had made significant progress in implementing recommendations and becoming better prepared to respond to such events than it had been in 2023.

The agency was crticised in 2025 for its timing in sending out a mobile emergency alert during a severe weather event. Flooding occurred on Easter Friday, but an alert was only sent out the following afternoon when the worst of the storm had passed. Auckland Emergency Management defended itself on the basis that there had initially been a lower risk on the Friday, while there was a much higher risk on the Saturday when soil was saturated, people had already been displaced, and more travel was occurring.

== Council-controlled organisations ==
Auckland Council has several council-controlled organisations (CCOs). These include any organisation of which the Council appoints at least 50% of its board members. CCOs that are responsible for a significant service or activity, or those who manage assets worth more than $10 million are described as substantive.

Extant CCOs
Status	CCO	Date of creation
Substantive	Auckland Transport	1 November 2010
Substantive	Tātaki Auckland Unlimited	December 2020
Substantive	Watercare Services Ltd	21 August 1991
Substantive	Auckland Future Fund	September 2024
Legacy	Te Taumata Toi-a-Iwi Arts Regional Trust	
Legacy	Contemporary Art Foundation	
Legacy	Mangere Mountain Education Trust	
Legacy	Mount Albert Grammar School Community Swimming Pool Trust	
Legacy	Te Motu a Hiaroa (Puketutu Island) Governance Trust	

Defunct CCOs
CCOs	Existed	Fate
City of Manukau Education Trust	?−2012	Independent charitable organisation
Auckland Council Property Ltd	?−2015	Merged into Panuku Development Auckland
Waterfront Auckland	?−2015	Merged into Panuku Development Auckland
Auckland Council Investments Limited	?−2018	Share holdings in Auckland Airport and the Port sold to the Council
Auckland Tourism, Events and Economic Development	?−2020	Merged to become Auckland Unlimitied
Regional Facilities Auckland	?−2020	Merged to become Auckland Unlimitied
Highbrook Park Trust	?−2021	
Manukau Beautification Charitable Trust	?−2024	Independent organisation: Beautification Trust
Te Puru Trust	?−2024	Independent organisation: Te Puru Community Charitable Trust
Eke Panuku Development Auckland	?−1 July 2025	Replaced by Auckland Urban Development Office and the Property Department as an internal function.

== Finances ==
The council oversees the finances of the entire Auckland Council Group which includes its CCOs, who are funded primarily from council revenue. In the 2025/2026 financial year, the council group reported $8.7 billion in revenue and $7 billion in expenditure. Gross debt was at $16.5 billion, while net debt was at $15.5 billion, equivalent to 17.9% of the council's total asset value of $86.5 billion.

Council rates saw an average residential increase of 7.9% in 2026. As with most councils in the country, rates increases are contentious but are also the main source of revenue. This has prompted significant pressure from councilors to find savings so as to avoid higher rates increases.

The council received approximately $3 billion in rates revenue in the 2025/2026 financial year, of which $2.6 billion was from general rates and $406 million was from targeted rates. Other major sources of revenue included $1.9 billion in fees and user charges, $1.4 billion in grants and subsidies, and $1.4 billion in vested assets (largely driven by the transfer of assets from City Rail Link Limited).

=== Expenditure ===
2025/2026 Capital and Operating Expenditure by Category
Category	Capex (millions, NZD)	Percentage of total Capex	Opex (millions, NZD)	Percentage of total Opex	Notes
Roads and footpaths	$605	16%	$227	5%	Managed by Auckland Transport until 1 October 2026
Public transport and travel demand management	$942	25%	$1,235	28%	Public transport managed by Auckland Transport. Also includes cycling as well as road and freight productivity/optimisation, which were managed by Auckland Transport until 1 October 2026
Water supply	$286	8%	$212	5%	Managed by Watercare Services
Wastewater treatment and disposal	$673	18%	$253	6%	Managed by Watercare Services
Stormwater management	$208	6%	$101	2%	
Regionally delivered council services	$653	18%	$1,649	38%	Includes emergency management, investment (Auckland Future Fund, Ports of Auckland Limited), environmental services, regional community services, regional governance, regional planning, waste services, third party amenities and grants, organisational support, and regulatory services
Local council services	$211	6%	$443	10%	Allocated to the local boards who govern local council services such as parks, libraries, pools, leisure centres, and community events
Council controlled services	$141	4%	$269	6%	Includes Tātaki Auckland Unlimited, as well as urban regeneration, property management, economic development, and destination marketing which are functions that were transferred from CCOs to the council on 1 July 2025
Total	$3,719	100%	$4,389	100%	

== Elections ==
The initial Council elections in October 2010 returned a mostly centre-left council, with Len Brown as mayor. Brown was re-elected in October 2013, again with a largely supportive council. The 2016 mayoral election was won by Labour MP Phil Goff, who had a landslide victory over his nearest rivals, Victoria Crone and future Green Party MP Chlöe Swarbrick. Goff won re-election in the 2019 mayoral election and chose not to run in the 2022 mayoral election, which was won by Wayne Brown. In the 2025 mayoral election, Brown was re-elected with an absolute majority.

In September 2026, the council voted to switch from postal voting to booth voting for the 2028 elections in response to allegations of vote rigging and ballot theft during the 2025 elections for the Ōtara-Papatoetoe and Manurewa local boards.

=== List ===
==== Council ====
- 2010
- (2011)
- 2013
- 2016
- (2018)
- 2019
- 2022
- 2025

==== Mayoral ====
- 2010
- 2013
- 2016
- 2019
- 2022
- 2025

==== Local boards ====
- 2010
- 2013
- 2016
- 2019
- (2022)
- 2022
- (2023)
- 2025
- (2026)
