= Pākiri River =

Stream in the Auckland Region, New Zealand

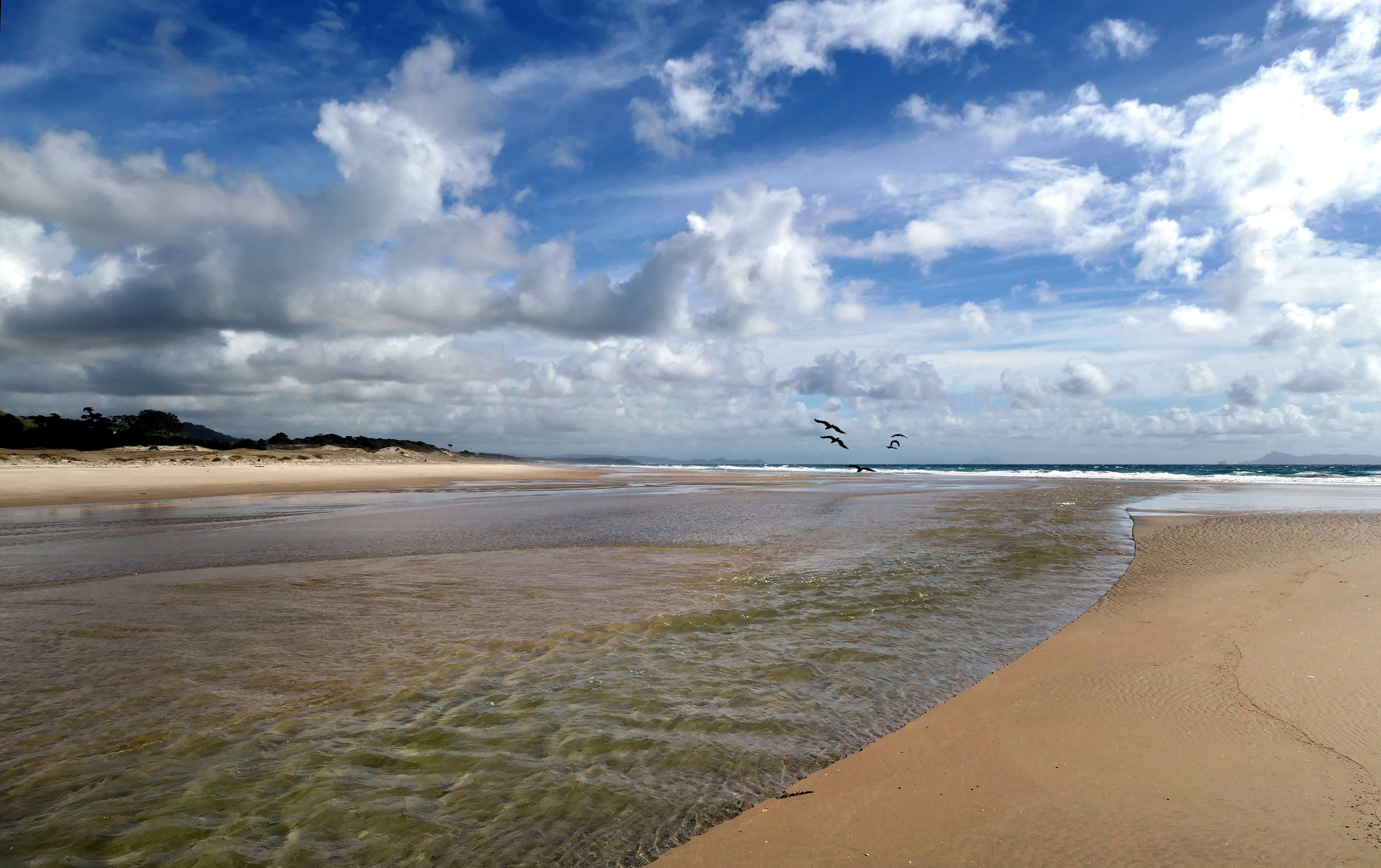
- The Pākiri River mouth at Pākiri Beach

- Mouth of the Pākiri River Pākiri River (New Zealand)
- Route of the Pākiri River

Location
- Country: New Zealand
- Region: Auckland Region

Physical characteristics
- Source
  - coordinates: 36.2988°S 174.7116°E
- Mouth: Pacific Ocean
  - coordinates: 36.2437°S 174.72221°E
- Length: 8 km (5 mi)

Basin features
- Progression: Pākiri River → Jellicoe Channel → Hauraki Gulf → Pacific Ocean
- Tributaries
  - right: Pākiri Stream

The Pākiri River is a river of the Auckland Region of New Zealand's North Island. It flows generally northwest from hills overlooking Leigh, reaching the Pacific Ocean coast 20 kilometres (12 mi) west of Wellsford.

== See also ==
- List of rivers of New Zealand
