= Whakanewha Regional Park =

Regional park in New Zealand

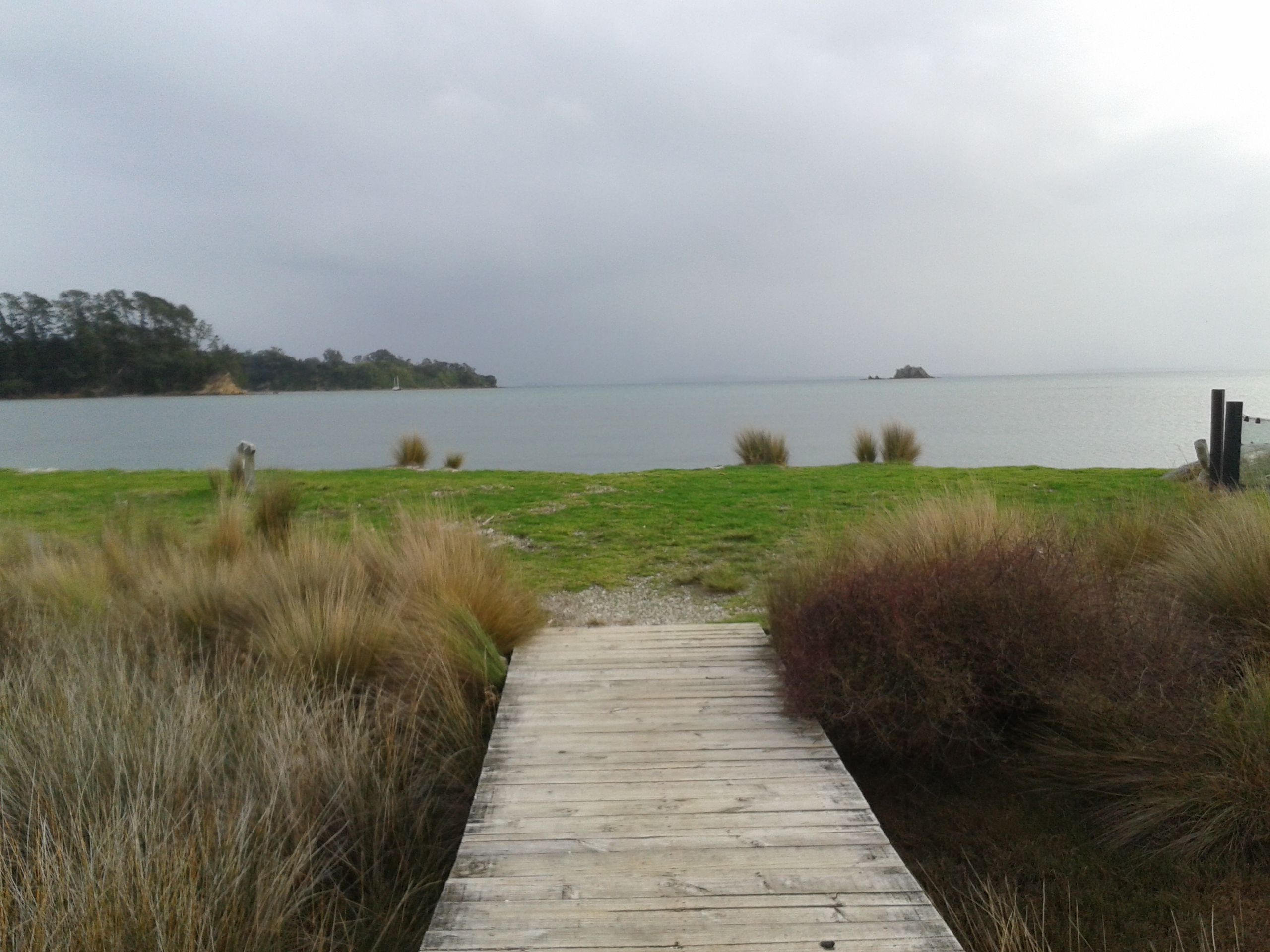
- Interactive map of Whakanewha Regional Park
- Location: Waiheke Island, Auckland, New Zealand
- Coordinates: 36.822°S 175.077°E
- Area: 270 ha (670 acres)
- Operator: Auckland Council

Whakanewha Regional Park is a regional park situated on Waiheke Island in New Zealand's Hauraki Gulf. It is owned and operated by Auckland Council.

== Geography ==
Whakanewha is located in central Waiheke Island, on the southern coast. The regional park extends from the ridge line towards Rocky Bay / Whakanewha Bay, and includes the catchments of three streams which flow into the bay. The forest is dominated by broadleaf trees including taraire and pūriri, and podocarp trees such as kahikatea and tānekaha. A large wetland is found in the south-west of the park, which is a habitat for species including the New Zealand bittern, banded rail and fernbird.

== History ==
Whakanewha has a long history of Tāmaki Māori occupation. Large shell middens are located here, as well as a pā site. The name translates to "shading eyes from the setting sun". Groups with association to the area include Ngāti Pāoa, Ngāi Tai ki Tāmaki and Te Ākitai Waiohua.

During the 1850s, members of Ngāti Pāoa grew large quantities of fruit and vegetables to supply the city of Auckland on eastern Waiheke Island, including at Whakanewha. Around the year 1855, Samuel Wood purchased part of Whakanewha. The Māori residents of the area had not been consulted and disputed the claim, burning down Wood's house in retaliation. The Crown confirmed Wood's title to his land in 1858, and Wood sold the land soon afterwards. Afterwards, the O'Brien family lived on the land, developing the area as a sheep farm.

In 1994, Whakanewha was purchased in order to be redeveloped into a regional park. The park was formally opened in February 2007.

Much of the land is made up of regenerating mānuka and kānuka shrubland, which is replacing the former farmland of the area. Many native tree species in the park have thrived more successfully than their counterparts on the mainland, due to the lack of possums on Waiheke Island. In the 1990s, the cascade stream and poukaraka wetland were home to the Giant kōkopu, however due to issues with stream sedimentation from an unsealed road upstream of the park, the habitat has significantly degraded. Auckland Council are considering options for reintroducing the species to the area.
