= Āwhitu Regional Park =

Regional park in New Zealand

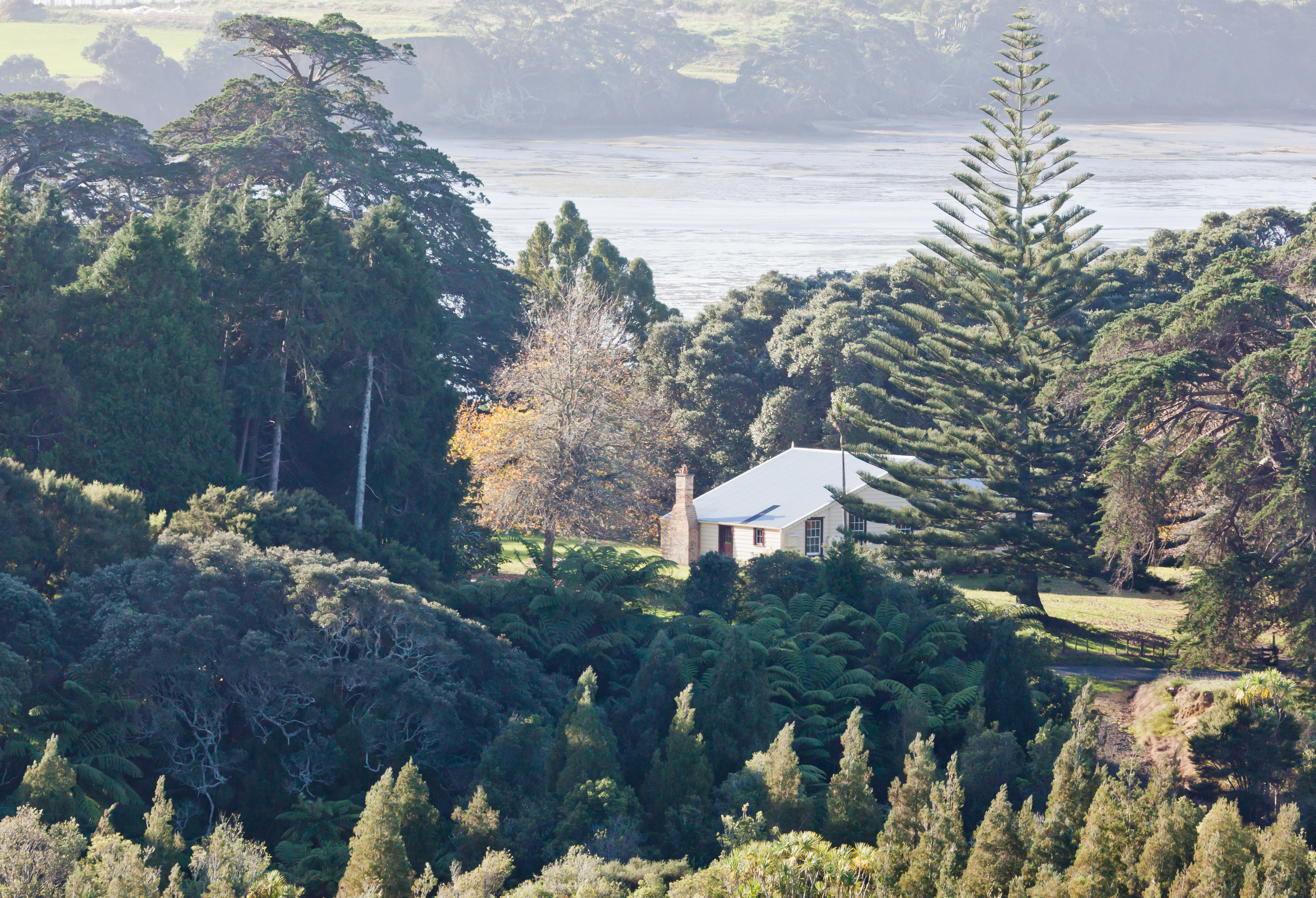
- The Brook homestead in Āwhitu Regional Park
- Interactive map of Āwhitu Regional Park
- Location: Franklin, Auckland, New Zealand
- Coordinates: 37.0923432°S 174.6444653°E
- Area: 116 ha (290 acres)
- Operator: Auckland Council

Āwhitu Regional Park is a regional park situated on the Āwhitu Peninsula, just south of Manukau Heads on the western side of the Manukau Harbour. It is situated in Franklin in Auckland in New Zealand's North Island, and is administered by Auckland Council.

== Geography and biodiversity ==
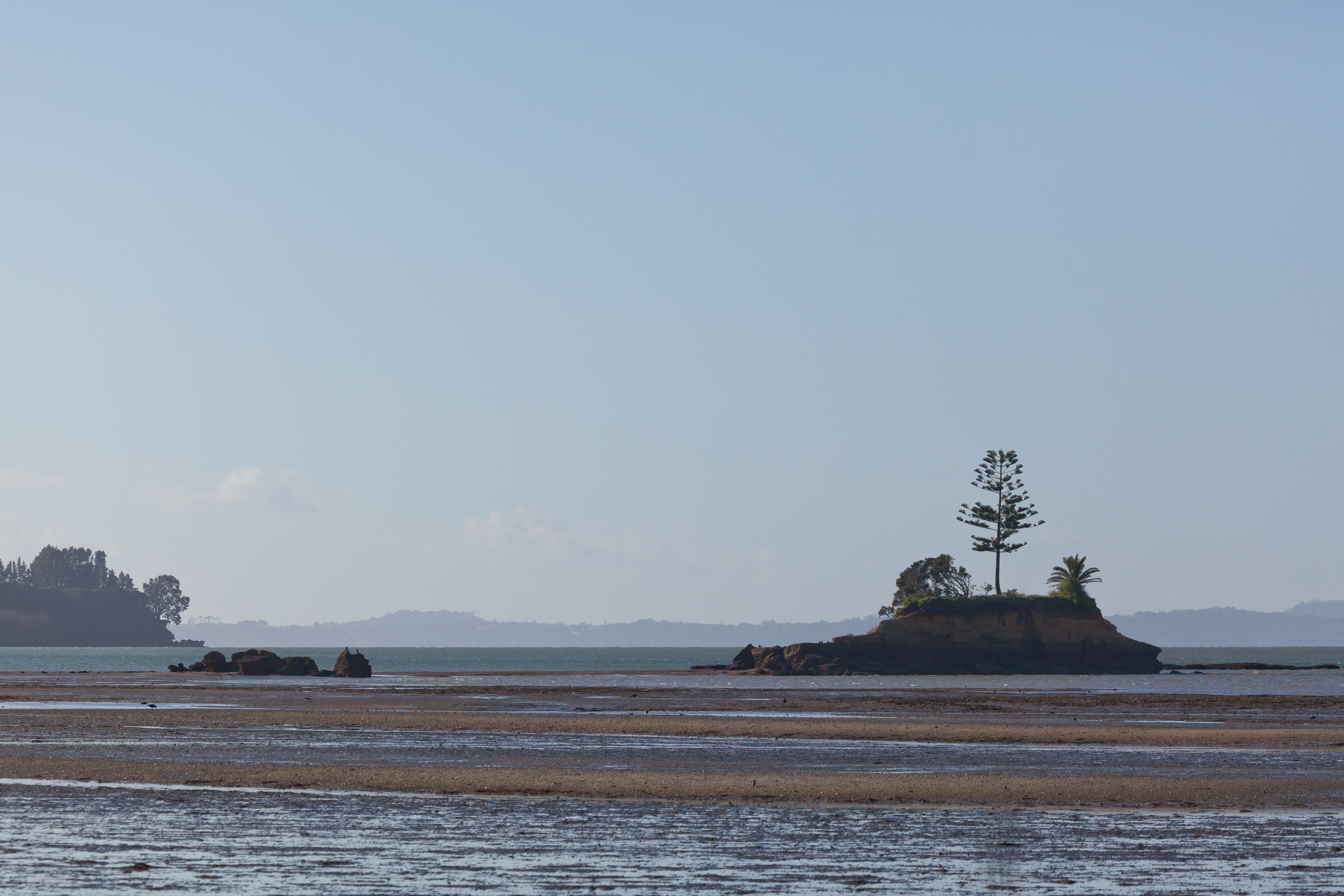
View of Kauritutahi Island from Āwhitu Regional Park

Āwhitu Regional Park is located approximately 33 kilometres (21 mi) north of Waiuku, on the Āwhitu Peninsula. The regional park is a mix of grassland, exotic conifer trees and wetlands, and historically before being turned into farmland was predominantly wetland and coastal pōhutukawa forest. Offshore from the park is Kauritutahi Island, and the park is home to several white sand beaches.

The park's wetlands are home to bird species including the banded rail (moho-pererū), spotless crake (pūweto), Australasian bittern (matuku hūrepo) and New Zealand fernbird (kōtātā). The park is home to the largest population of fernbirds in the Manukau Harbour.

== History ==
The Āwhitu Regional Park area has historically been settled and utilised by Tāmaki Māori peoples, including Waiohua tribes Ngāti Te Ata Waiohua, Ngāti Tamaoho and Te Ākitai Waiohua. Ngāti Te Ata historically settled in temporary settlements on the Āwhitu Peninsula, based seasonally in different locations depending on what resources were available.

English immigrants John and Sarah Brook settled on the Āwhitu Peninsula in 1875, building a homestead for their family in 1878. The Brook family ran a sheep and cattle farm on the property, until it was sold in 1971 to become a regional park. The park was officially opened for public use in 1975.

In 1985, a lake was created in the park, which became home to Eleocharis sphacelata, a native sedge species.

== Recreation ==
Āwhitu Regional Park is home to the nine-hole Āwhitu Golf Club, as well as Āwhitu Environmental Camp, a camp often used by school groups. In addition, the park is used for nature walks, horse riding, kayaking, and launching boats.
