= Tawhitokino Regional Park =

Regional park in Auckland, New Zealand

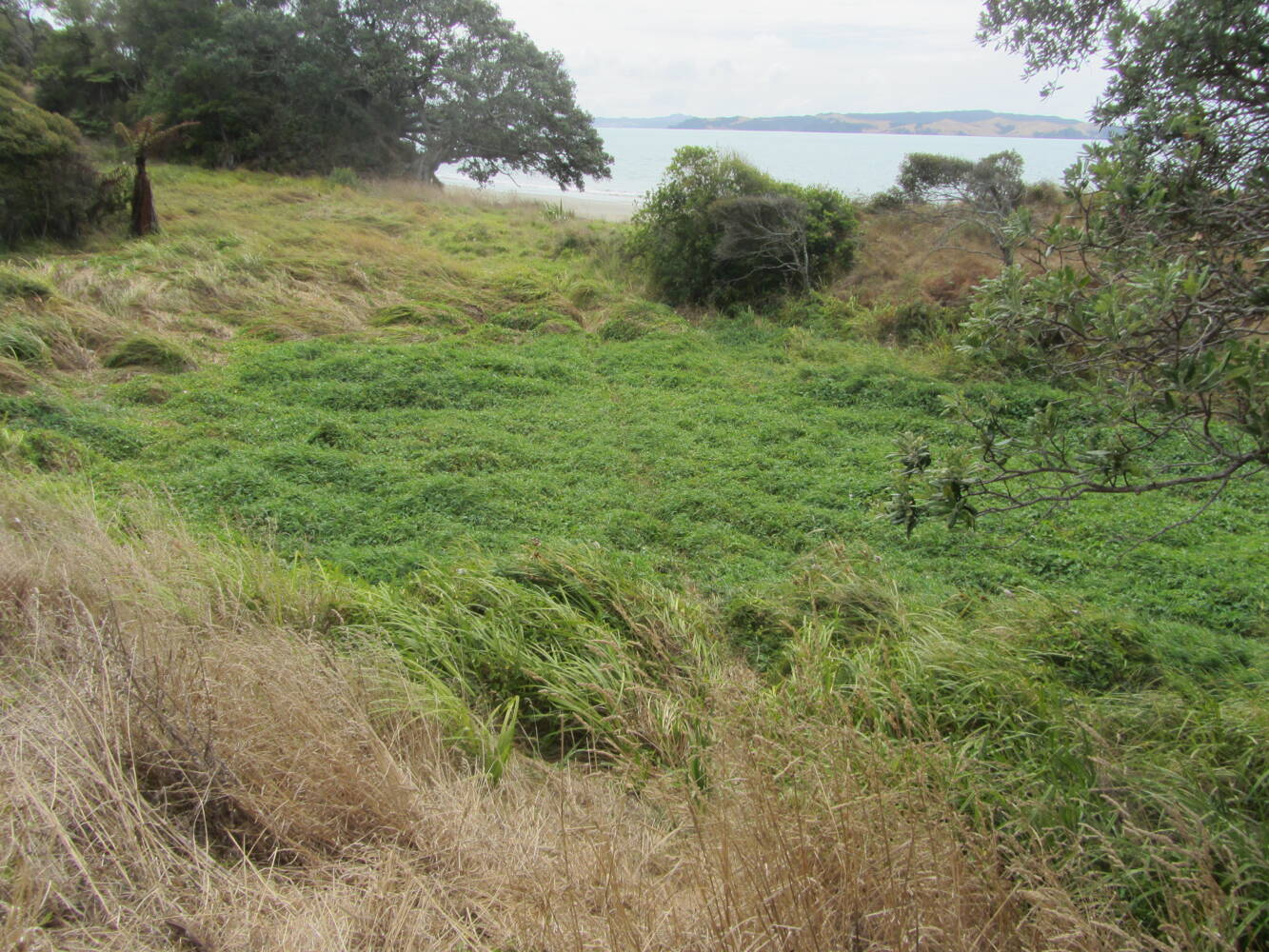

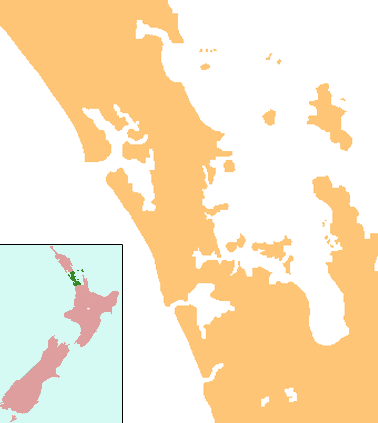
- Location within New Zealand Auckland
- Location: Franklin, Auckland, New Zealand
- Coordinates: 36.9437721°S 175.2087283°E
- Operator: Auckland Council

Tawhitokino Regional Park is a regional park situated in the Auckland Region of New Zealand's North Island. It is owned and operated by Auckland Council. The park cannot be accessed by road, only by a 30-minute walk from Waitī Bay to the west.

== Geography and biodiversity ==
Tawhitokino Regional Park borders Tawhitokino Beach, a sandy beach that looks out to the Coromandel Peninsula. The park features old pōhutukawa trees, as well as kōwhai and rewarewa.
