= Te Rau Pūriri Regional Park =

Regional park in Auckland, New Zealand

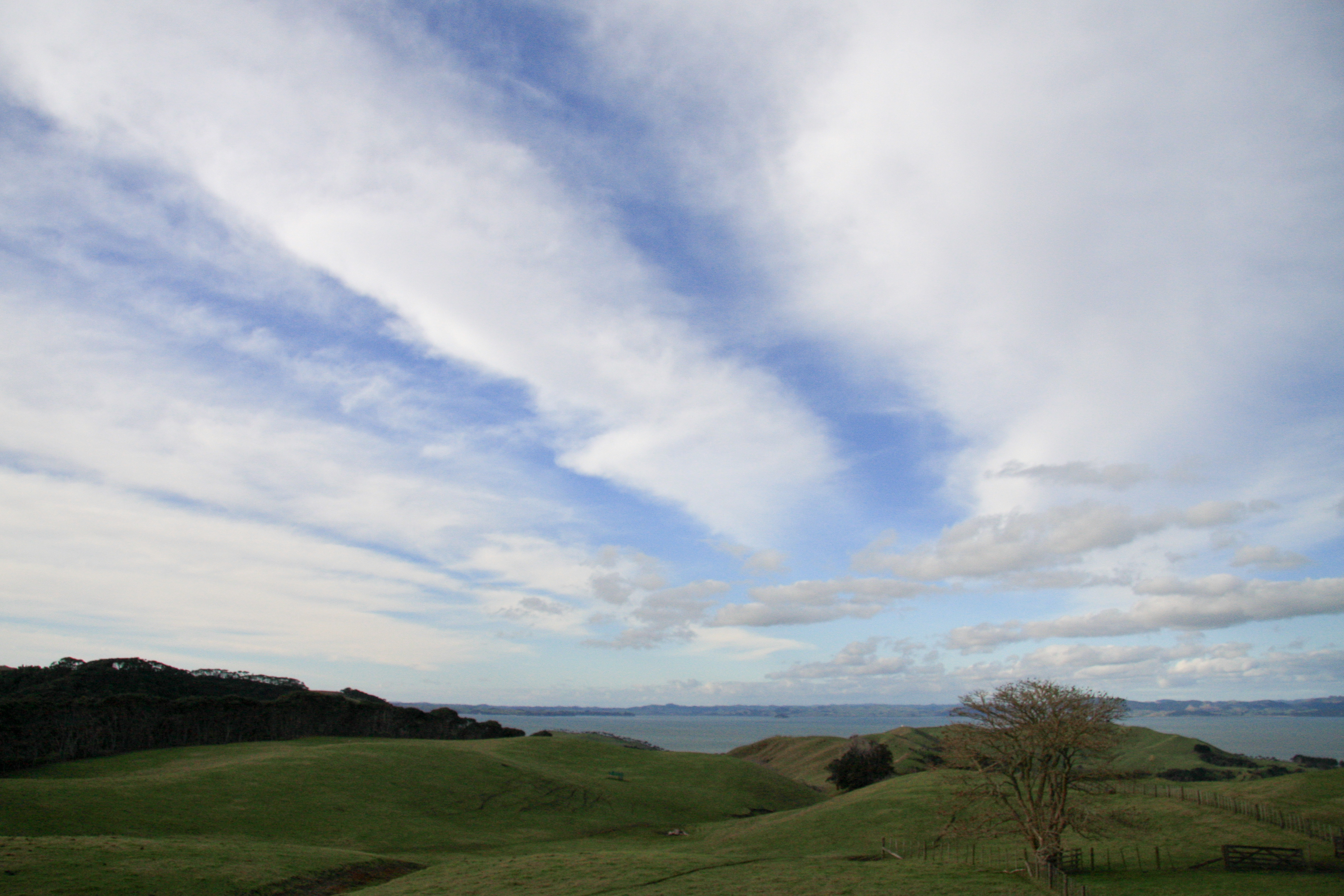
- Interactive map of Te Rau Pūriri Regional Park
- Location: Rodney, Auckland, New Zealand
- Coordinates: 36.4865°S 174.2639°E
- Area: 249 ha (620 acres)
- Operator: Auckland Council

Te Rau Pūriri Regional Park is a regional park situated in the Auckland Region of New Zealand's North Island. It is owned and operated by Auckland Council.

== Geography ==
The regional park is located on the east coast of the South Kaipara Head. The park includes areas of rolling farmland and sandy beaches at Waipiro Bay. Primarily run as a working farm, the area has patches of introduced trees such as Eucalyptus botryoides and Populus deltoides, with sections of regenerating kanuka and rewarewa forest to the north, and coastal pūriri forest to the east. To the south of the regional park is the Wairotoroto wetland.

== History ==
The land the park is located on was purchased by Auckland politician Daniel Pollen in 1870, alongside a local farmer, William Young. In 1882, the pair sold the land to Alfred Buckland, who developed it as a part of his cattle run found on most of the peninsula. The cattle run was subdivided into individual farms in the 1920s, and the future park land was primarily used for running deer.

The land was purchased by the Auckland Regional Council and Rodney District councils in 2006, who developed the area as a regional park. Te Rau Pūriri is not a traditional name, instead was a name gifted by the elders of Haranui Marae, who named the park after the regenerating coastal pūriri forest.
