= Whakatīwai Regional Park =

Regional park in the Waikato Region, New Zealand

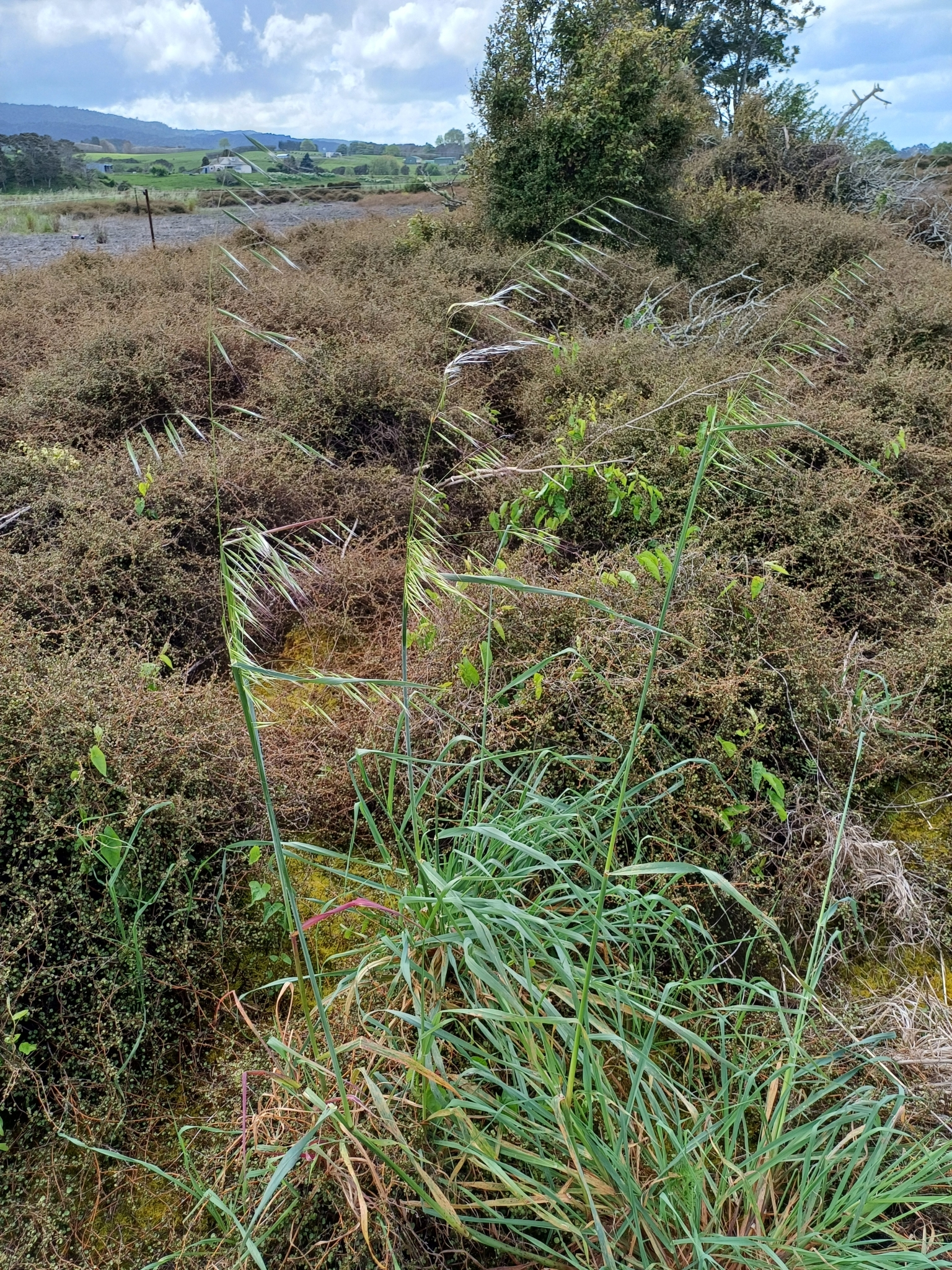

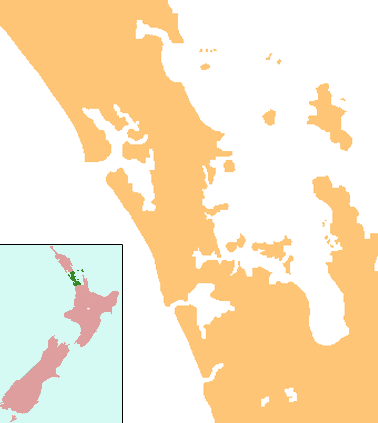
- Location within New Zealand Auckland
- Location: Hauraki District, Waikato Region, New Zealand
- Coordinates: 37.073°S 175.28°E
- Operator: Auckland Council

Whakatīwai Regional Park is a regional park on New Zealand's North Island. It runs from the eastern side of the Hunua Ranges, where it adjoins Hunua Ranges Regional Park, down to the Firth of Thames coast, just north of the settlement of Whakatīwai. It is in the Hauraki District and the Waikato Region, not far from the border with the Auckland Region, and is owned and operated by Auckland Council.

In December 1967, the Auckland Regional Authority purchased a 323-hectare property owned by the McKerras family in order to create the park.
