= 2022 Auckland Council election =

- 8 October 2022
- Turnout: 404,541 (35.17% ▼0.05 pp)
- Mayor
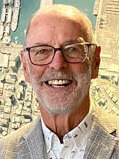

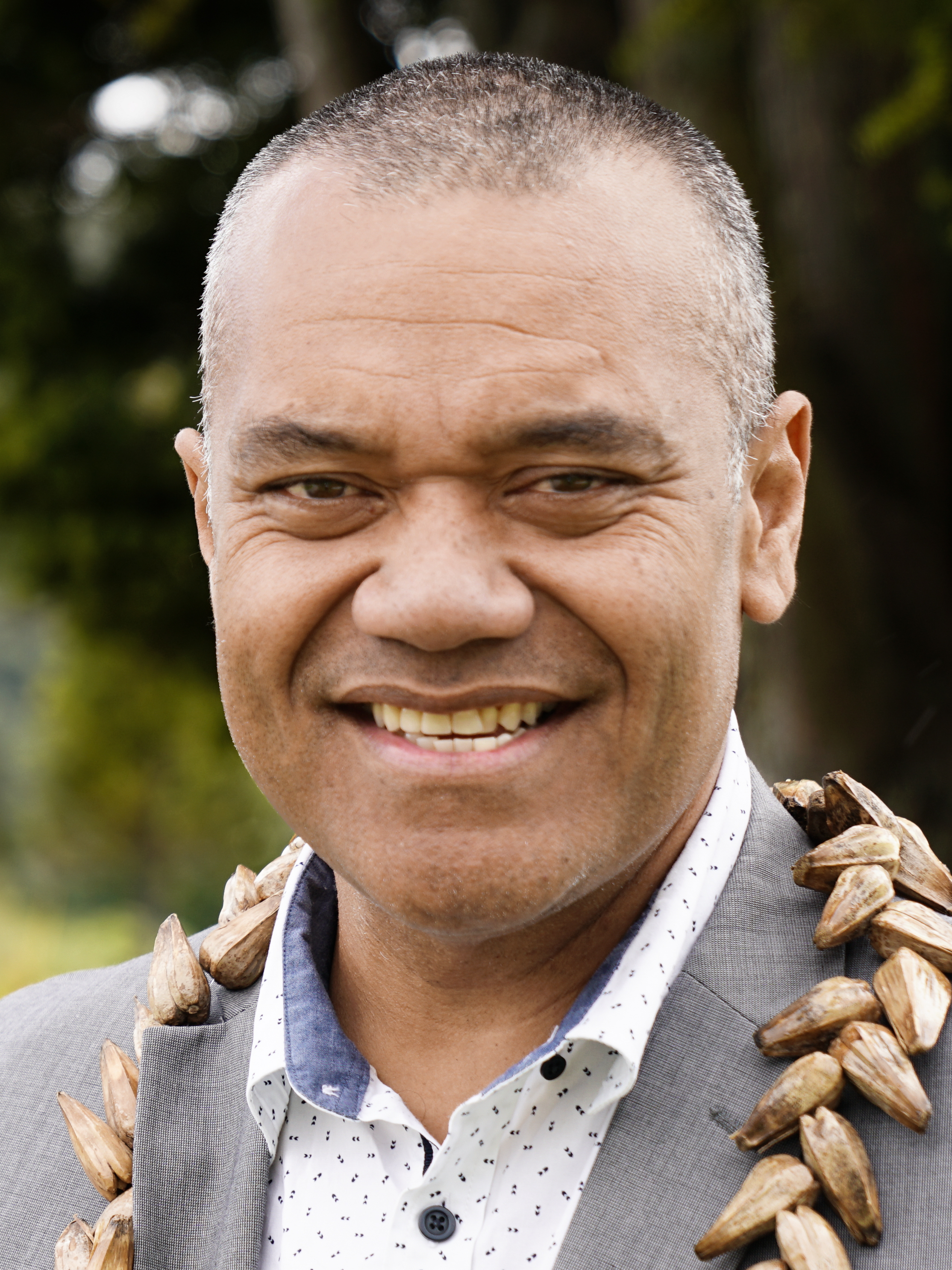
			Ind
Candidate	Wayne Brown	Efeso Collins	Craig Lord
Party	Independent	Independent	Independent
Popular vote	181,810	124,802	25,021
Percentage	44.94%	30.85%	6.19%
Mayor before election
Phil Goff
Independent Labour
Elected mayor
Wayne Brown
Independent
- Councillors
- 20 seats on the governing body of Auckland Council; 11 seats needed for a majority
Party	Seats	+/–
Independent	7	0
Labour	5	+1
Putting People First	2	0
C&R	2	−1
WestWards	1	+1
Team Franklin	1	+1
City Vision	1	−1
MPAT	1	−1
This lists parties that won seats. See the complete results below.
IND hold	LAB hold	PPF hold	C&R hold
IND gain	LAB gain	–	–
–	TF hold	CV hold	MPAT hold
WW gain	–	–	–
Control before	Control after
No majority	No majority

The 2022 Auckland Council election was a local election held from September to 8 October in the Auckland Region of New Zealand as part of that year's nation-wide local elections. Voters elected the mayor of Auckland, 20 councillors, 149 local board members (across 21 local boards), and 35 licensing trustees (across 5 licensing trusts) for the 2022–2025 term. Postal voting and the first-past-the-post voting system were used.

== Key dates ==
Key dates for the 2022 elections in Auckland.

15 July	Candidate nominations opened
12 August	Candidate nominations closed at noon
17 August	Official declaration of nominated candidates
12 September	Final electoral roll certified by Electoral Officer
16–21 September	Voting papers were sent to voters
16 September – 8 October	Voting was open
8 October	Election day – voting closed at noon
8 October	Progress results released
10 October	Preliminary results released
15 October	Final results released

== Background ==
=== Mayor ===
The incumbent mayor, Phil Goff, did not stand for re-election.

=== Council ===
Twenty members were to be elected to the Auckland Council, across thirteen wards, using the first past the post election system in single member wards and block voting in multi-member wards.

== Summary ==
=== Composition ===
Ward	2019		Elected	
Mayor	Independent Labour	Phil Goff	Independent	Wayne Brown
Albany	Putting People First	John Watson	Putting People First	John Watson
Albany	Putting People First	Wayne Walker	Putting People First	Wayne Walker
Albert-Eden-Puketāpapa	C&R	Christine Fletcher	C&R	Christine Fletcher
Albert-Eden-Puketāpapa	City Vision	Cathy Casey	City Vision	Julie Fairey
Franklin	Team Franklin	Bill Cashmore	Team Franklin	Andy Baker
Howick	Independent	Sharon Stewart	Independent	Sharon Stewart
Howick	Independent	Paul Young	Independent	Maurice Williamson
Manukau	Labour	Alf Filipaina	Labour	Alf Filipaina
Manukau	Labour	Efeso Collins	Labour	Lotu Fuli
Manurewa-Papakura	MPAT	Daniel Newman	MPAT	Daniel Newman
Manurewa-Papakura	MPAT	Angela Dalton	Independent	Angela Dalton
Maungakiekie-Tāmaki	Labour	Josephine Bartley	Labour	Josephine Bartley
North Shore	Independent	Richard Hills	Independent	Richard Hills
North Shore	Independent	Chris Darby	Independent	Chris Darby
Ōrākei	C&R	Desley Simpson	C&R	Desley Simpson
Rodney	Independent	Greg Sayers	Independent	Greg Sayers
Waitākere	Labour	Shane Henderson	Labour	Shane Henderson
Waitākere	Independent	Linda Cooper	WestWards	Ken Turner
Waitematā and Gulf	City Vision	Pippa Coom	Independent	Mike Lee
Whau	C&R	Tracy Mulholland	Labour	Kerrin Leoni
^{R} did not run for re-election

=== Candidates ===
Party / ticket	Mayor				Councillors			
Party / ticket	2019	Candidates	Elected	+/−	2019	Candidates	Elected	+/−
Independent	0	20	1	▲1	6	32	7	▲1
Labour	no candidates				4	7	5	▲1
Putting People First	no candidates				2	2	2	0
C&R	no candidates				3	8	2	▼1
WestWards	no candidates				0	2	1	▲1
Team Franklin	no candidates				1	1	1	0
City Vision	no candidates				2	3	1	▼1
MPAT	no candidates				2	2	1	▼1
Animal Justice	0	1	0	0	no candidates			
Ind Labour / Ind Green	0	1	0	0	no candidates			
Independent Locals	no candidates				(new)	1	0	0
Outdoors	no candidates				0	1	0	0
Rock the Vote	no candidates				(new)	1	0	0
Rodney First	no candidates				0	1	0	0
New Conservatives	0	1	0	0	no candidates			
#Burns&Young	no candidates				(new)	2	0	0
Your Community Future	no candidates				(new)	2	0	0
Independent Labour	1	0	0	▼1	no candidates			
Total:	1	23	1	0	20	65	20	0

== Mayoral election ==
Centre-right Wayne Brown defeated centre-left Efeso Collins in the race, 44.9% to 30.9%.

== Albany ward ==
2022 Albany ward election
Party	Candidate	Votes	%	±%
Putting People First	John Watson^{†}	20,575	40.43	−23.04
Putting People First	Wayne Desmond Walker^{†}	20,007	39.31	−15.83
Independent Locals	Victoria Short	14,968	29.41	(new)
Your Community Future	Jake Law	9,120	17.92	(new)
Your Community Future	Sylvia Yang	7,298	14.34	(new)
Independent	Tony Corbett	6,529	12.83	(new)
Independent	Callum Blair	6,480	12.73	(new)
Independent	John Davies	3,189	6.27	(new)
Independent	Alezix Heneti	1,381	2.71	−4.48
Informal votes		87	0.17	+0.12
Blank votes		3,073	6.04	−0.79
Turnout		50,892	38.56	+0.60
Registered electors		131,986		
Putting People First hold				
Putting People First hold				
^{†} incumbent

== Albert-Eden-Puketāpapa ward ==
2022 Albert-Eden-Puketāpapa ward election
Party	Candidate	Votes	%	±%
C&R	Christine Fletcher^{†}	20,021	46.65	−2.55
City Vision	Julie Fairey	16,966	39.54	(new)
C&R	Will McKenzie	16,182	37.71	(new)
City Vision	Red Tsounga	14,013	32.65	(new)
Independent	Stewart Brown	6,211	14.47	(new)
Independent	Frank Fu	3,662	8.53	(new)
Informal votes		36	0.08	+0.04
Blank votes		2,212	5.15	−0.91
Turnout		42,913	35.74	−0.61
Registered electors		120,065		
C&R hold				
City Vision hold				
^{†} incumbent

== Franklin ward ==
2022 Franklin ward election
Party	Candidate	Votes	%	±%
Team Franklin	Andy Baker	14,187	58.39	(new)
Independent	Keven Mealamu	9,279	38.19	(new)
Informal votes		10	0.04	n/a
Blank votes		820	3.38	n/a
Turnout		24,296	42.59	n/a
Registered electors		57,045		
Team Franklin hold				

== Howick ward ==
2022 Howick ward election
Party	Candidate	Votes	%	±%
Independent	Sharon Stewart^{†}	16,013	42.33	−8.83
Independent	Maurice Williamson	14,544	38.44	(new)
#Burns&Young	Paul Young^{†}	11,876	31.39	−12.64
#Burns&Young	Bo Burns	11,491	30.37	(new)
Independent	Damian Light	9,825	25.97	−6.43
Independent	Morgan Xiao	3,840	10.15	(new)
Informal votes		123	0.33	+0.08
Blank votes		1,202	3.18	−1.08
Turnout		37,832	35.73	−2.48
Registered electors		105,884		
Independent hold				
Independent gain from Independent				
^{†} incumbent

== Manukau ward ==
2022 Manukau ward election
Party	Candidate	Votes	%	±%
Labour	Alf Filipaina^{†}	16,734	62.76	−11.29
Labour	Lotu Fuli	14,935	56.01	(new)
C&R	Malcolm Turner	8,512	31.92	(new)
Outdoors	Hine Afeaki	5,699	21.37	(new)
Informal votes		27	0.10	+0.02
Blank votes		1,345	5.04	−1.80
Turnout		26,663	24.25	−0.31
Registered electors		109,932		
Labour hold				
Labour hold				
^{†} incumbent

== Manurewa-Papakura ==
2022 Manurewa-Papakura ward election
Party	Candidate	Votes	%	±%
MPAT	Daniel Newman^{†}	15,214	55.25	−3.20
Independent	Angela Dalton^{†}	12,055	43.78	−20.03
MPAT	Rangi McLean	7,948	28.87	(new)
Labour	Sago Feagaiga	6,315	22.93	(new)
Labour	Ilango Krishnamoorthy	4,049	14.70	−1.28
Independent	Karin Kerr	3,046	11.06	+1.60
Informal votes		42	0.15	+0.00
Blank votes		924	3.36	−1.48
Turnout		27,535	26.49	−2.56
Registered electors		103,946		
MPAT hold				
Independent gain from MPAT				
^{†} incumbent

== Maungakiekie-Tāmaki ward ==
2022 Maungakiekie-Tāmaki ward election
Party	Candidate	Votes	%	±%
Labour	Josephine Ruth Bartley^{†}	8,877	44.94	+0.18
C&R	Troy Elliott	6,868	34.77	(new)
Independent	John Peebles	1,812	9.17	(new)
Independent	Christopher Carroll	1,213	6.14	(new)
Informal votes		29	0.15	−0.05
Blank votes		954	4.83	−3.00
Turnout		19,753	32.26	−0.31
Registered electors		61,240		
Labour hold				
^{†} incumbent

== North Shore ward ==
2022 North Shore ward election
Party	Candidate	Votes	%	±%
Independent	Richard Hills^{†}	19,269	47.38	−1.62
Independent	Chris Darby^{†}	17,123	42.10	−3.80
C&R	Danielle Grant	14,584	35.86	−3.53
C&R	George Wood	12,009	29.53	(new)
Independent	Tony Bunting	4,370	10.74	+0.35
Independent	Raymond Tan	3,857	9.48	(new)
Independent	Adrian Tyler	3,270	8.04	(new)
Informal votes		55	0.14	+0.04
Blank votes		1,182	2.91	−0.91
Turnout		40,671	37.81	+0.90
Registered electors		107,567		
Independent hold				
Independent hold				
^{†} incumbent

== Ōrākei ward ==
2022 Ōrākei ward election
Party	Candidate	Votes	%	±%
C&R	Desley Simpson^{†}	24,634	78.41	+8.35
Independent	Faith Aaron	4,724	15.04	(new)
Informal votes		10	0.03	−0.08
Blank votes		2,049	6.52	+1.16
Turnout		31,417	45.58	+3.02
Registered electors		68,929		
C&R hold				
^{†} incumbent

== Rodney ward ==
2022 Rodney ward election
Party	Candidate	Votes	%	±%
Independent	Greg Sayers^{†}	13,539	56.80	n/a
Rodney First	Beth Houlbrooke	5,850	24.54	(new)
Independent	Rob Ryan	1,447	6.07	(new)
Independent	Anne Perratt	1,109	4.65	(new)
Independent	Hannah North	1,048	4.40	(new)
Informal votes		18	0.08	n/a
Blank votes		824	3.46	n/a
Turnout		23,835	45.46	n/a
Registered electors		52,427		
Independent hold				
^{†} incumbent

== Waitākere ward ==
2022 Waitākere ward election
Party	Candidate	Votes	%	±%
Labour	Shane Henderson^{†}	16,545	41.40	+3.33
WestWards	Ken Turner	14,654	36.67	(new)
Independent	Linda Cooper^{†}	13,995	35.02	−3.19
WestWards	Shawn Blanchfield	8,472	21.20	(new)
Independent	Peter Chan	8,199	20.52	−7.13
Independent	Tua Schuster	3,278	8.20	(new)
Independent	Aimela Hansen	2,648	6.63	(new)
Independent	Michael Coote	2,550	6.38	−0.25
Informal votes		61	0.15	−0.06
Blank votes		1,528	3.82	−0.73
Turnout		39,959	32.91	−1.39
Registered electors		121,409		
Labour hold				
WestWards gain from Independent				
^{†} incumbent

== Waitematā and Gulf ward ==
2022 Waitematā and Gulf ward election
Party	Candidate	Votes	%	±%
Independent	Mike Lee	9,415	45.19	+10.53
City Vision	Pippa Coom^{†}	8,254	39.62	+3.20
Rock the Vote	Mike Burton	1,032	4.95	(new)
Independent	Andi Liu	636	3.05	(new)
Informal votes		10	0.05	−0.14
Blank votes		1,485	7.13	+0.97
Turnout		20,832	39.45	−0.15
Registered electors		52,804		
Independent gain from City Vision				
^{†} incumbent

== Whau ward ==
2022 Whau ward election
Party	Candidate	Votes	%	±%
Labour	Kerrin Leoni	8,373	46.66	(new)
C&R	Tracy Mulholland^{†}	8,011	44.65	+12.31
Informal votes		7	0.04	−0.32
Blank votes		1,552	8.65	+2.20
Turnout		17,943	31.48	−2.38
Registered electors		56,991		
Labour gain from C&R				
^{†} incumbent

== Local boards ==
Elections were also held for the 21 local boards in Auckland.

Local board	Electoral System	Seats	Control		Turnout	Details	Sources
Local board	Electoral System	Seats	Previous	Result	Turnout	Details	Sources
Albert-Eden	FPP	8	4 C&R; 4 City Vision	4 C&R; 4 City Vision	28,153 (38.8%)	Details	
Aotea-Great Barrier	FPP	5	5 Independents	5 Independents	531 (56.6%)	Details	
Devonport-Takapuna	FPP	6	6 Heart of the Shore; 2 A Fresh Approach; 1 Team George Wood	4 A Fresh Approach; 2 C&R North Shore	18,907 (43.4%)	Details	
Franklin	FPP	9	6 Team Franklin; 3 Independent	8 Team Franklin; 1 Independent	15,836 (41.8%)	Details	
Henderson-Massey	FPP	8	4 Labour; 4 Independents	5 Labour; 3 Independents	24,343 (29.8%)	Details	
Hibiscus and Bays	FPP	8	3 Coast People; 3 Backing the Bays; 1 Positively Penlink; 1 Independents	3 Coast People; 3 Backing the Bays; 1 Independent Locals; 1 Team Coast	34,046 (42.0%)	Details	
Howick	FPP	9	4 C&R; 3 Independents; 2 weknowhowick	4 #weknow; 2 Practical not Political; 2 C&R; 1 Independents	37,840 (35.9%)	Details	
Kaipātiki	FPP	8	5 Shore Action; 3 Kaipātiki Voice	8 Shore Action	21,794 (34.5%)	Details	
Māngere-Ōtāhuhu	FPP	7	7 Labour	6 Labour; 1 C&R	13,643 (25.5%)	Details	
Manurewa	FPP	8	8 Manurewa Action Team	5 Manurewa Action Team; 3 #LoveManurewa	16,267 (26.3%)	Details	
Maungakiekie-Tāmaki	FPP	7	4 Labour; 3 C&R	4 Labour; 3 C&R	16,988 (31.9%)	Details	
Ōrākei	FPP	7	7 C&R	7 C&R	29,896 (45.6%)	Details	
Ōtara-Papatoetoe	FPP	7	7 Labour	5 Labour; 1 INDEPENDENTLY PAPATOETOE; 1 Independents	13,041 (23.3%)	Details	
Papakura	FPP	6	4 Papakura Action Team; 2 Papakura First	6 Papakura Action Team	11,284 (27.1%)	Details	
Puketāpapa	FPP	6	4 Roskill Community Voice; 2 C&R	4 C&R; 2 Roskill Community Voice	13,720 (31.9%)	Details	
Rodney	FPP	9	7 Rodney First; 1 Independents	5 Rodney First; 3 Independents	21,520 (46.5%)	Details	
Upper Harbour	FPP	6	4 Independents; 2 Living Upper Harbour	3 Living Upper Harbour; 3 Independents	16,883 (33.8%)	Details	
Waiheke	FPP	6	6 Independents	6 Independents	3,780 (51.8%)	Details	
Waitākere Ranges	FPP	6	4 Future West; 2 WestWards	4 Future West; 2 WestWards	15,661 (40.3%)	Details	
Waitematā	FPP	7	6 City Vision; 1 C&R	4 C&R; 3 City Vision	22,154 (38.6%)	Details	
Whau	FPP	7	5 Labour; 1 Independents; 1 Green	5 Labour; 2 Independents	17,960 (31.7%)	Details	
All 21 local boards		150					

== Licensing trusts ==
Elections were also held for the 5 licensing trusts in Auckland.

Council	Electoral System	Seats	Control		Turnout	Details	Sources
Council	Electoral System	Seats	Previous	Result	Turnout	Details	Sources
Birkenhead	FPP	6	6 Unknown	3 Your Community Trust; 1 Your Community Trust – Shore Action; 1 Shore Action; 1 Labour			
Mt Wellington	FPP	6	5 Labour; 1 C&R	4 C&R; 2 Labour			
Portage	FPP	10	3 City Vision; 2 Labour; 2 Trusts Action Group; 1 Independent	4 Independents; 3 City Vision; 2 Trusts Action Group; 1 Labour			
Waitakere	FPP	7	3 Independents; 2 Labour; 1 Trusts Action Group; 1 Future West	3 Independents; 2 Trusts Action Group; 1 Labour; 1 Future West			
Wiri	FPP	6	6 Manurewa Action Team	4 Manurewa Action Team; 2 #LoveManurewa			
All 5 Auckland licensing trusts		35					
