= Wesley, New Zealand =

Wesley
- Suburb
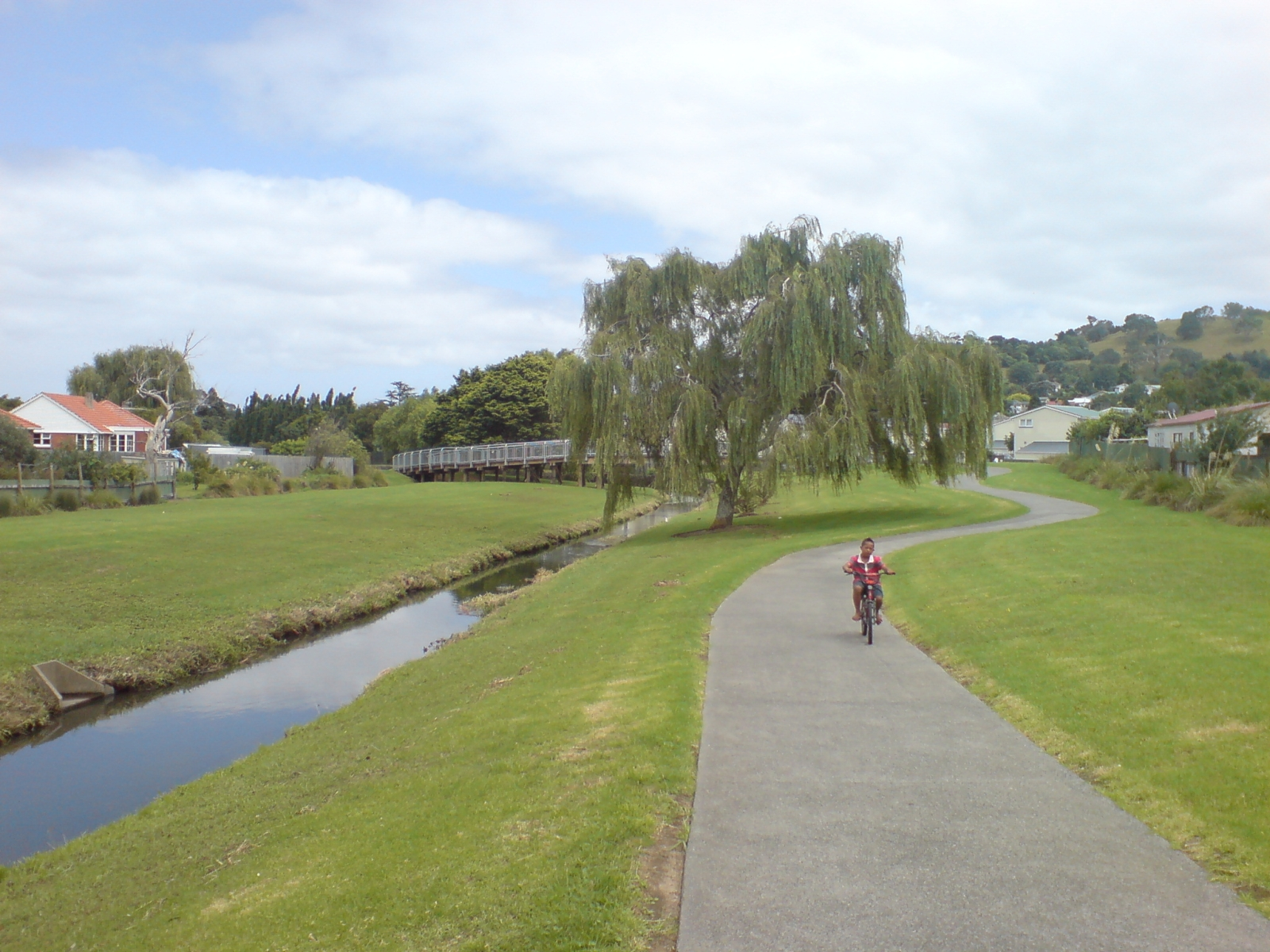
- Underwood Park / Walmsley Park in the west of Wesley
- Interactive map of Wesley
- Coordinates: 36°53′58″S 174°43′51″E
- Country: New Zealand
- City: Auckland
- Local authority: Auckland Council
- Electoral ward: Albert-Eden-Puketāpapa ward
- Local board: Puketāpapa Local Board

Area
  - Land: 197 ha (490 acres)

Population (June 2025)
  - Total: 5,140
  - Density: 2,610/km^{2} (6,760/sq mi)

Mount Albert	Sandringham	Balmoral
Owairaka	Wesley	Three Kings
New Windsor	Mount Roskill	Hillsborough

Wesley is a suburb of Auckland, New Zealand, located in the south-west of the Auckland isthmus. The area is a part of the Oakley Creek catchment, and in the 19th and early 20th centuries was primarily swampland owned by the Weslayan Mission. The New Zealand Government developed Wesley as a state housing area in the 1940s and 1950s.

== Geography ==
Wesley is a suburb of Auckland on the Auckland isthmus, bound by New Windsor in the west, Mount Roskill to the south and Sandringham to the north. It is bisected by Oakley Creek, which flows north-west towards the Waitematā Harbour at Waterview. The Southwestern Motorway also bisects the suburb.

== History ==
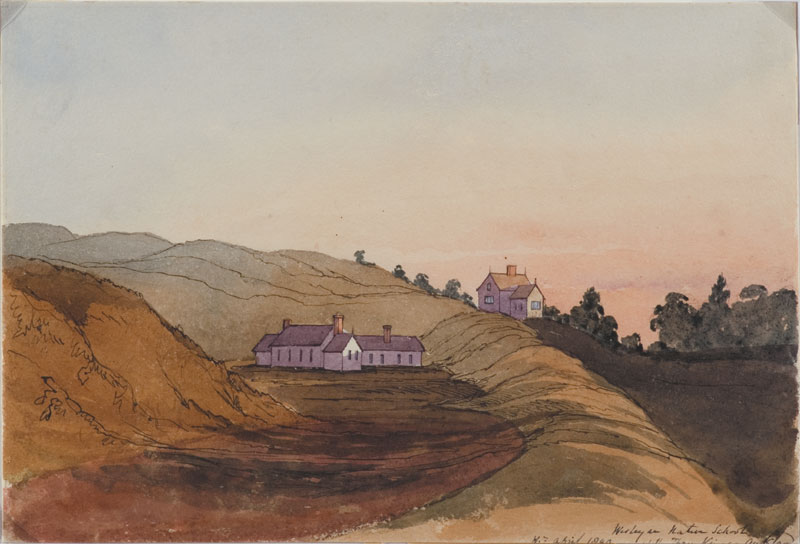
1849 sketch of the Wesleyan Native School by William Fox

The area has been settled by Tāmaki Māori iwi hapū and since at least the 13th century. The Oakley Creek, traditionally known as Te Auaunga, was a crayfish, eels and weka for Tāmaki Māori. Harakeke (New Zealand flax) and raupō, which grew along the banks of the creek, were harvested here to create Māori traditional textiles. By the early 18th century, the area was within the rohe of Waiohua. After the defeat of Kiwi Tāmaki, the paramount chief of the iwi, the area became part of the rohe of Ngāti Whātua (modern-day Ngāti Whātua Ōrākei).

In 1850, the Wesleyan Mission was gifted 280 acres by the Crown between Stoddard Road and Ōwairaka / Mount Albert, which became known as the Mission Swamp, or Wesley Estate. In 1944, the New Zealand Government purchased a large section of land known as the Lower Wesley Block, and developed the area as state housing in the mid to late 1940s. This followed the Upper Wesley Block to the east, (modern Mount Roskill), where Wesley College and mission was located. Construction on the state housing area was finished in the early 1950s, which saw the opening of Wesley Primary school in 1951, followed by Wesley Intermediate School in 1953. A community centre was planned for the new suburb, however the First National Government of New Zealand in the 1950s was les interested in the construction of community centres, and the facility remained unbuilt. The Black Hall, a private building constructed during the 1951 New Zealand waterfront dispute, acted as a community centre, until the hall was damaged in 1968.

In 1948 and 1953, the Wesley suffered from substantial flooding from the Oakley Creek. Because of this, the Mount Roskill Borough Council invested substantial money into anti-flooding measures around the creek.

== Demographics ==
Wesley covers 1.97 km^{2} (0.76 sq mi) and had an estimated population of 5,140 as of June 2025, with a population density of 2,609 people per km^{2}.

Historical population
Year	Pop.	±% p.a.
2006	5,163	—
2013	5,040	−0.34%
2018	5,286	+0.96%
2023	4,725	−2.22%
The 2006 population is for a larger area of 2.05 km^{2}. Source:

Wesley had a population of 4,725 in the 2023 New Zealand census, a decrease of 561 people (−10.6%) since the 2018 census, and a decrease of 315 people (−6.2%) since the 2013 census. There were 2,352 males, 2,361 females and 15 people of other genders in 1,359 dwellings. 2.3% of people identified as LGBTIQ+. The median age was 32.5 years (compared with 38.1 years nationally). There were 1,002 people (21.2%) aged under 15 years, 1,137 (24.1%) aged 15 to 29, 2,025 (42.9%) aged 30 to 64, and 558 (11.8%) aged 65 or older.

People could identify as more than one ethnicity. The results were 18.9% European (Pākehā); 10.4% Māori; 40.3% Pasifika; 36.6% Asian; 6.5% Middle Eastern, Latin American and African New Zealanders (MELAA); and 1.2% other, which includes people giving their ethnicity as "New Zealander". English was spoken by 86.9%, Māori language by 2.8%, Samoan by 9.8%, and other languages by 42.3%. No language could be spoken by 2.7% (e.g. too young to talk). New Zealand Sign Language was known by 0.4%. The percentage of people born overseas was 49.3, compared with 28.8% nationally.

Religious affiliations were 42.7% Christian, 7.5% Hindu, 14.9% Islam, 0.8% Māori religious beliefs, 1.2% Buddhist, 0.2% New Age, and 1.0% other religions. People who answered that they had no religion were 25.7%, and 6.2% of people did not answer the census question.

Of those at least 15 years old, 852 (22.9%) people had a bachelor's or higher degree, 1,440 (38.7%) had a post-high school certificate or diploma, and 1,434 (38.5%) people exclusively held high school qualifications. The median income was $27,300, compared with $41,500 nationally. 180 people (4.8%) earned over $100,000 compared to 12.1% nationally. The employment status of those at least 15 was that 1,605 (43.1%) people were employed full-time, 408 (11.0%) were part-time, and 180 (4.8%) were unemployed.

Individual statistical areas
Name	Area (km^{2})	Population	Density (per km^{2})	Dwellings	Median age	Median income
Wesley West	0.68	2,706	3,979	747	31.6 years	$27,100
Wesley South (Note: Wesley South is the commercial area south of Stoddard Road,)	0.68	36	53	12	23.3 years	$34,100
Wesley East	0.61	1,983	3,251	603	34.0 years	$27,500
New Zealand					38.1 years	$41,500

== Landmarks and amenities ==
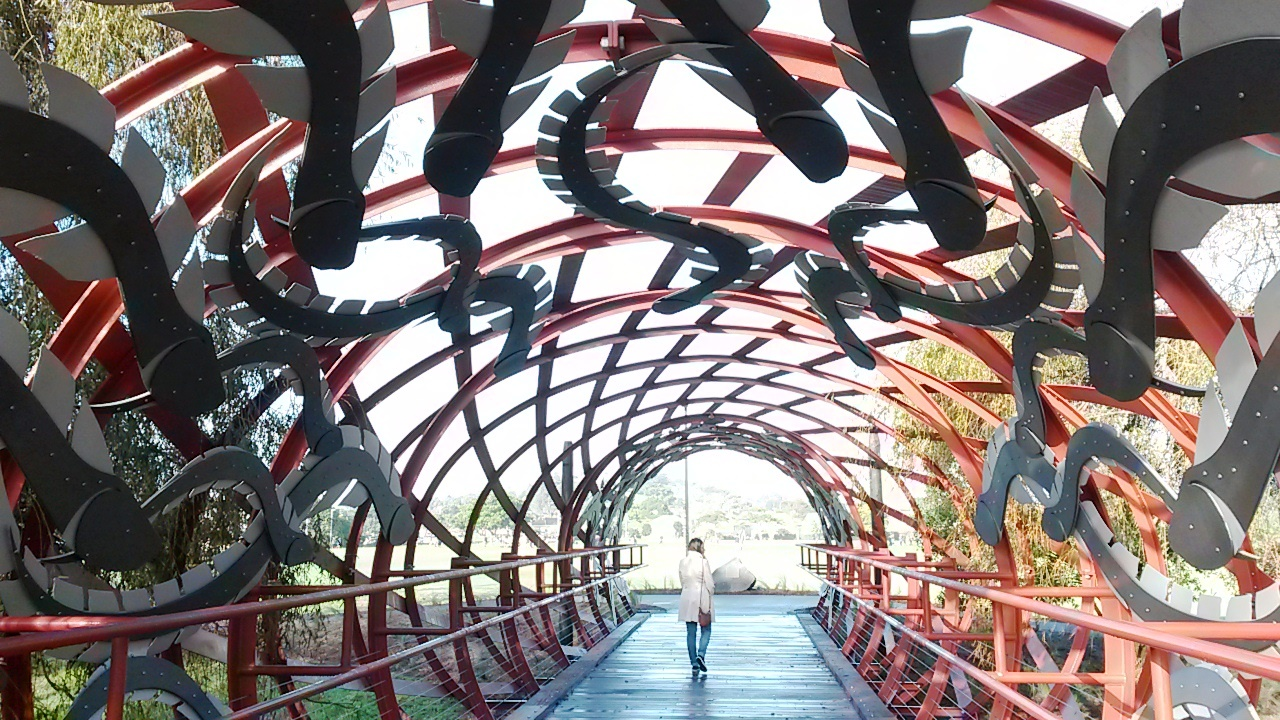
The Hinaki Eel Trap Bridge

- The Hinaki Eel Trap Bridge, which crosses the Oakley Creek.
- Mt Roskill War Memorial Hall, in War Memorial Park.
- Oakley Creek, a major stream on the Auckland isthmus. The creek is bordered by a number of public parks, including the War Memorial Park, Walmsley Park and Underwood Park.
- The Wesley Community Centre. Opened in 2003, the building won the New Zealand Institute of Architects Regional Award, and an award from the Concrete Society.

== Education ==
Wesley Intermediate is an intermediate school (years 7–8) with a roll of 121, which opened in 1953. Wesley Primary School is a contributing primary school (years 1–6) with a roll of 163, which was opened in 1951.

Both schools are coeducational. Rolls are as of July 2025.

Local state or state-integrated secondary schools include Mount Albert Grammar School, Marist College and St Peter's College.

== Local government ==
The first local government in the area was the Mt Roskill Highway Board, that was formed on 7 August 1868 to administer and fund the roads in the area. In 1883, the Highway Board became the Mt Roskill Road Board. Wesley was a part of the Mt Roskill Borough between 1947 and 1989, after which it was amalgamated into Auckland City. On 1 November 2010, Auckland Council was formed as a unitary authority governing the entire Auckland Region, and Wesley become a part of the Puketāpapa local board area, administered by the Puketāpapa Local Board. The Puketāpapa local board area forms a part of the Albert-Eden-Puketāpapa ward, which votes for two members of Auckland Council. The Albert-Eden-Puketāpapa ward is represented by councillors Christine Fletcher and Julie Fairey.

== Bibliography ==
- Reidy, Jade (2013). Not Just Passing Through: the Making of Mt Roskill (2nd ed.). Auckland: Puketāpapa Local Board. ISBN 978-1-927216-97-2. OCLC 889931177. Wikidata Q116775081.
