= Puketāpapa Local Board =

Coordinates: 36°54′31.93″S 174°45′28.73″E

Puketāpapa Local Board Te Poari ā-Rohe o Puketāpapa
- Local board of Puketāpapa
- Puketāpapa Local Board area in Auckland
- Country: New Zealand
- Region: Auckland
- Territorial authority: Auckland
- Ward: Albert-Eden-Puketāpapa ward
- Legislated: 2010

Area
  - Land: 18.72 km^{2} (7.23 sq mi)

Population (June 2025)
  - Total: 63,200
  - Density: 3,380/km^{2} (8,740/sq mi)

Local Board Members

Leadership
- Chairperson: Roseanne Hay, C & R
- Deputy chairperson: Ella Kumar, C & R

Structure
- Seats: 6
- Political groups: Communities and Residents (4); City Vision (2)
- Length of term: 3 years

Elections
- Last election: 2025
- Next election: 2028

Meeting place
- 560 Mt Albert Road, Three Kings, Auckland

The Puketāpapa Local Board is one of the 21 local boards of the Auckland Council, and is one of the two boards overseen by the council's Albert-Eden-Puketāpapa ward councilors.

The Puketāpapa board, named after the Māori name for Mount Roskill, covers the suburbs of Hillsborough, Lynfield, Mount Roskill, Three Kings, Waikowhai, and Wesley.

The board is governed by six board members elected at-large. The first board members were elected by the nationwide local elections, which were held on Saturday 9 October 2010.

== Geography ==
The area includes the suburbs of Wesley, Three Kings, Mt Roskill, Royal Oak, Hillsborough, Waikowhai and Lynfield.

== Demographics ==
Puketāpapa Local Board Area covers 18.72 km^{2} (7.23 sq mi) and had an estimated population of 63,200 as of June 2025, with a population density of 3,376 people per km^{2}.

Historical population
Year	Pop.	±% p.a.
2006	50,802	—
2013	52,938	+0.59%
2018	57,555	+1.69%
2023	56,949	−0.21%

Puketāpapa had a population of 56,949 in the 2023 New Zealand census, a decrease of 606 people (−1.1%) since the 2018 census, and an increase of 4,011 people (7.6%) since the 2013 census. There were 28,290 males, 28,446 females and 213 people of other genders in 18,045 dwellings. 3.5% of people identified as LGBTIQ+. The median age was 35.7 years (compared with 38.1 years nationally). There were 9,549 people (16.8%) aged under 15 years, 13,083 (23.0%) aged 15 to 29, 26,040 (45.7%) aged 30 to 64, and 8,277 (14.5%) aged 65 or older.

People could identify as more than one ethnicity. The results were 32.1% European (Pākehā); 6.7% Māori; 15.7% Pasifika; 50.4% Asian; 4.6% Middle Eastern, Latin American and African New Zealanders (MELAA); and 1.4% other, which includes people giving their ethnicity as "New Zealander". English was spoken by 89.7%, Māori language by 1.4%, Samoan by 4.0%, and other languages by 42.1%. No language could be spoken by 2.3% (e.g. too young to talk). New Zealand Sign Language was known by 0.4%. The percentage of people born overseas was 52.7, compared with 28.8% nationally.

Religious affiliations were 33.5% Christian, 13.8% Hindu, 8.3% Islam, 0.3% Māori religious beliefs, 2.3% Buddhist, 0.3% New Age, 0.1% Jewish, and 1.9% other religions. People who answered that they had no religion were 34.1%, and 5.6% of people did not answer the census question.

Of those at least 15 years old, 17,379 (36.7%) people had a bachelor's or higher degree, 17,211 (36.3%) had a post-high school certificate or diploma, and 12,813 (27.0%) people exclusively held high school qualifications. The median income was $41,100, compared with $41,500 nationally. 5,580 people (11.8%) earned over $100,000 compared to 12.1% nationally. The employment status of those at least 15 was that 24,519 (51.7%) people were employed full-time, 5,679 (12.0%) were part-time, and 1,461 (3.1%) were unemployed.

== 2025–2028 term ==
The current board members for the 2025–2028 term, elected at the 2025 local elections, are:

Name	Affiliation	Position
Roseanne Hay	Communities and Residents	Chairperson
Ella Kumar	Communities and Residents	Deputy Chairperson
Fiona Lai	Communities and Residents	Board member
Jon Turner	City Vision	Board member
Brendan Larmer	Communities and Residents	Board member
Rowan Cant	City Vision	Board member

== 2022–2025 term ==
The board members, elected at the 2022 local body elections, in election order:

Ella Kumar, C&R – Communities and Residents, (6682 votes)
Roseanne Hay, C&R – Communities and Residents, (6670 votes)
Fiona Lai, C&R – Communities and Residents, (6236 votes)
Jon Turner, Roskill Community Voice, (5421 votes)
Bobby Shen, Roskill Community Voice, (5317 votes)
Mark Pervan, C&R – Communities and Residents, (4882 votes)

== 2019–2022 term ==
The board members, elected at the 2019 local body elections, in election order:

Ella Kumar, C&R – Communities and Residents, (6528 votes)
Julie Fairey, Roskill Community Voice, (6390 votes)
Jon Turner, Roskill Community Voice, (6157 votes)
Fiona Lai, C&R – Communities and Residents, (5956 votes)
Bobby Shen, Roskill Community Voice, (5693 votes)
Harry Doig, Roskill Community Voice, (5545 votes)
