= Waitematā Local Board =

Coordinates: 36°50′44.51″S 174°45′46.83″E

Waitematā Local Board Te Poari ā-Rohe o Waitematā
- Local board of Waitematā
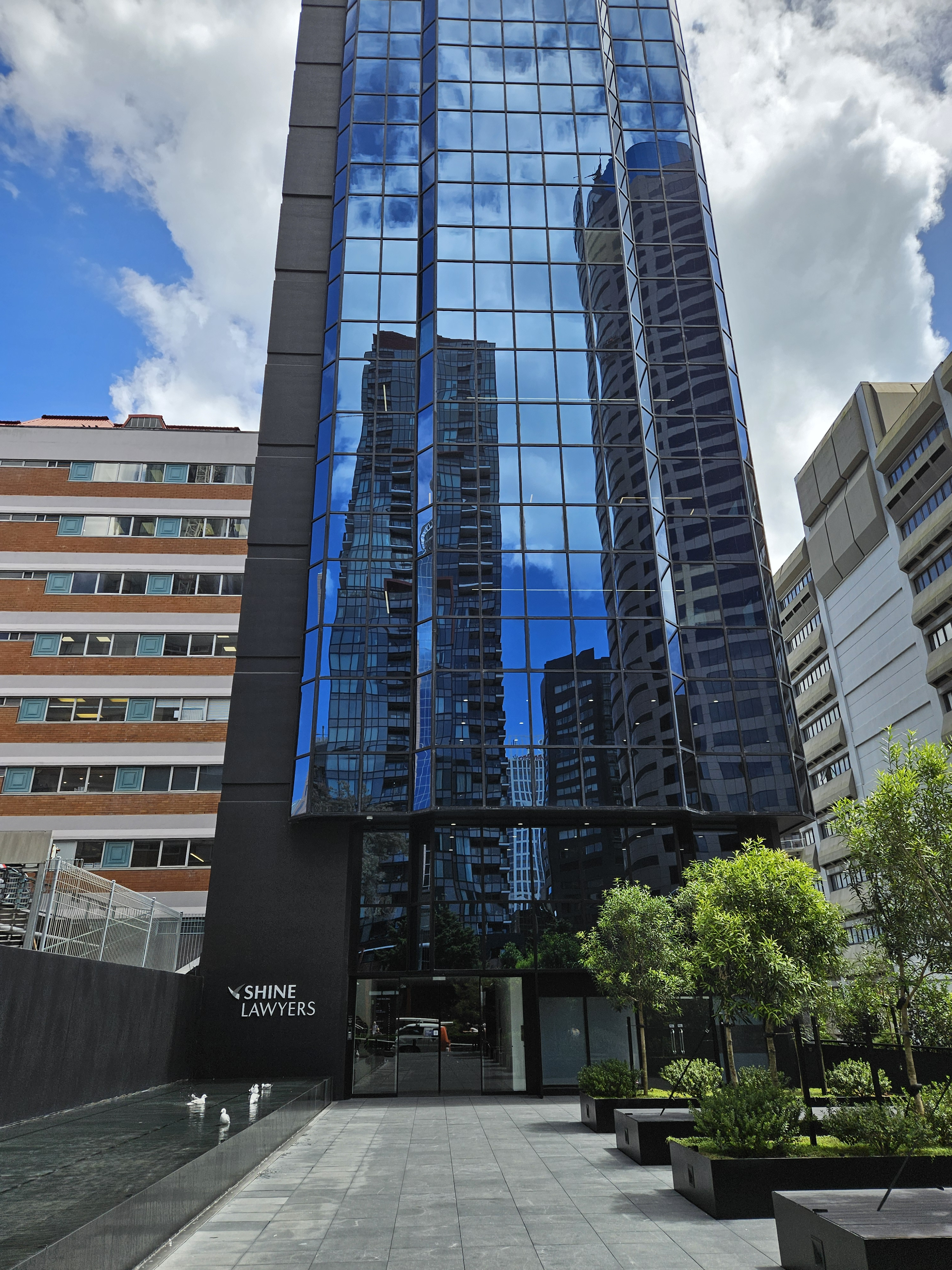
- 33 Federal Street, location of the Waitematā Local Board offices

- Waitematā in Auckland
- Country: New Zealand
- Region: Auckland
- Territorial authority: Auckland
- Ward: Waitematā and Gulf ward
- Legislated: 2010

Area
  - Land: 19.42 km^{2} (7.50 sq mi)

Population (June 2025)
  - Total: 88,900
  - Density: 4,580/km^{2} (11,900/sq mi)

Local Board Members

Leadership
- Chairperson: Alexandra Bonham, City Vision
- Deputy chairperson: Anahera Rawiri, City Vision

Structure
- Seats: 7
- Political groups: City Vision (5); Communities and Residents (2)
- Length of term: 3 years

Elections
- Last election: 2025
- Next election: 2028

Meeting place
- Council Chambers, Auckland Town Hall, 301-317 Queen Street, Auckland

The Waitematā Local Board is one of the 21 local boards of the Auckland Council, and is one of the three boards overseen by the council's Waitematā and Gulf Ward councillor.

The Waitematā board, named after the Waitematā Harbour which forms its northern boundary, covers the Auckland central business district, and the suburbs of Arch Hill, Eden Terrace, Freemans Bay, Grafton, Grey Lynn, Herne Bay, Mechanics Bay, Newmarket, Newton, Parnell, Ponsonby, Saint Marys Bay, Western Springs, and Westmere.

The board is governed by seven board members elected at-large.

== Geography ==
The western part of the suburb includes the suburbs of Western Springs, Herne Bay, Westmere, Grey Lynn, Arch Hill, St Mary's Bay, Ponsonby and Freemans Bay.

In the north is Wynyard Quarter, Auckland Waterfront and Auckland Central. To the south is the suburbs of Newton, Eden Terrace and Grafton. In the east are the suburbs of Newmarket and Parnell.

== Demographics ==
Waitematā Local Board Area covers 19.42 km^{2} (7.50 sq mi) and had an estimated population of 88,900 as of June 2025, with a population density of 4,578 people per km^{2}.

Historical population
Year	Pop.	±% p.a.
2006	62,928	—
2013	77,136	+2.95%
2018	82,866	+1.44%
2023	81,546	−0.32%

Waitematā had a population of 81,546 in the 2023 New Zealand census, a decrease of 1,320 people (−1.6%) since the 2018 census, and an increase of 4,410 people (5.7%) since the 2013 census. There were 40,347 males, 40,500 females and 702 people of other genders in 37,854 dwellings. 9.8% of people identified as LGBTIQ+. The median age was 33.3 years (compared with 38.1 years nationally). There were 7,206 people (8.8%) aged under 15 years, 26,775 (32.8%) aged 15 to 29, 39,333 (48.2%) aged 30 to 64, and 8,232 (10.1%) aged 65 or older.

People could identify as more than one ethnicity. The results were 59.9% European (Pākehā); 8.4% Māori; 5.8% Pasifika; 31.5% Asian; 4.8% Middle Eastern, Latin American and African New Zealanders (MELAA); and 1.6% other, which includes people giving their ethnicity as "New Zealander". English was spoken by 95.9%, Māori language by 2.1%, Samoan by 1.0%, and other languages by 32.3%. No language could be spoken by 1.2% (e.g. too young to talk). New Zealand Sign Language was known by 0.3%. The percentage of people born overseas was 47.7, compared with 28.8% nationally.

Religious affiliations were 25.4% Christian, 4.1% Hindu, 2.0% Islam, 0.4% Māori religious beliefs, 2.4% Buddhist, 0.5% New Age, 0.4% Jewish, and 1.8% other religions. People who answered that they had no religion were 57.9%, and 5.4% of people did not answer the census question.

Of those at least 15 years old, 36,528 (49.1%) people had a bachelor's or higher degree, 25,530 (34.3%) had a post-high school certificate or diploma, and 12,288 (16.5%) people exclusively held high school qualifications. The median income was $51,300, compared with $41,500 nationally. 16,185 people (21.8%) earned over $100,000 compared to 12.1% nationally. The employment status of those at least 15 was that 41,631 (56.0%) people were employed full-time, 10,245 (13.8%) were part-time, and 2,937 (4.0%) were unemployed.

== 2025–2028 term ==
The current board members for the 2025–2028 term, elected at the 2025 local elections, are:

Name	Affiliation	Position
Alexandra Bonham	City Vision	Chairperson
Anahera Rawiri	City Vision	Deputy Chairperson
Greg Moyle	Communities and Residents	Board member
Sarah Trotman	Communities and Residents	Board member
Caitlin Wilson	City Vision	Board member
Kara Kennedy	City Vision	Board member
Peter Elliott	City Vision	Board member

== 2022–2025 term ==
The board members for the 2022–2025 term, elected in the 2022 Auckland local elections, were:

Affiliation	Candidate	Votes
City Vision	Alexandra Bonham	9,152
C&R	Sarah Trotman	8,975
City Vision	Anahera Rawiri	8,691
City Vision	Richard Northey	8,656
C&R	Genevieve Sage	8,359
C&R	Allan Matson	8,305
C&R	Greg Moyle	8,130

== 2019–2022 term ==
The board members elected in the 2019 local body elections, in election order:

Alexandra Bonham, City Vision (7547 votes)
Adriana Christie, City Vision (7405 votes)
Sarah Trotman, C&R Communities and Residents (6888 votes) (resigned in 2021, replaced by Glenda Fryer)
Richard Northey, City Vision (6857 votes)
Julie Sandilands, City Vision (6773 votes)
Kerrin Leoni, City Vision (6767 votes)
Graeme Gunthorp, City Vision (6529 votes)
