= Albert-Eden Local Board =

Albert-Eden Local Board Te Poari ā-Rohe o Albert-Eden
- Local board
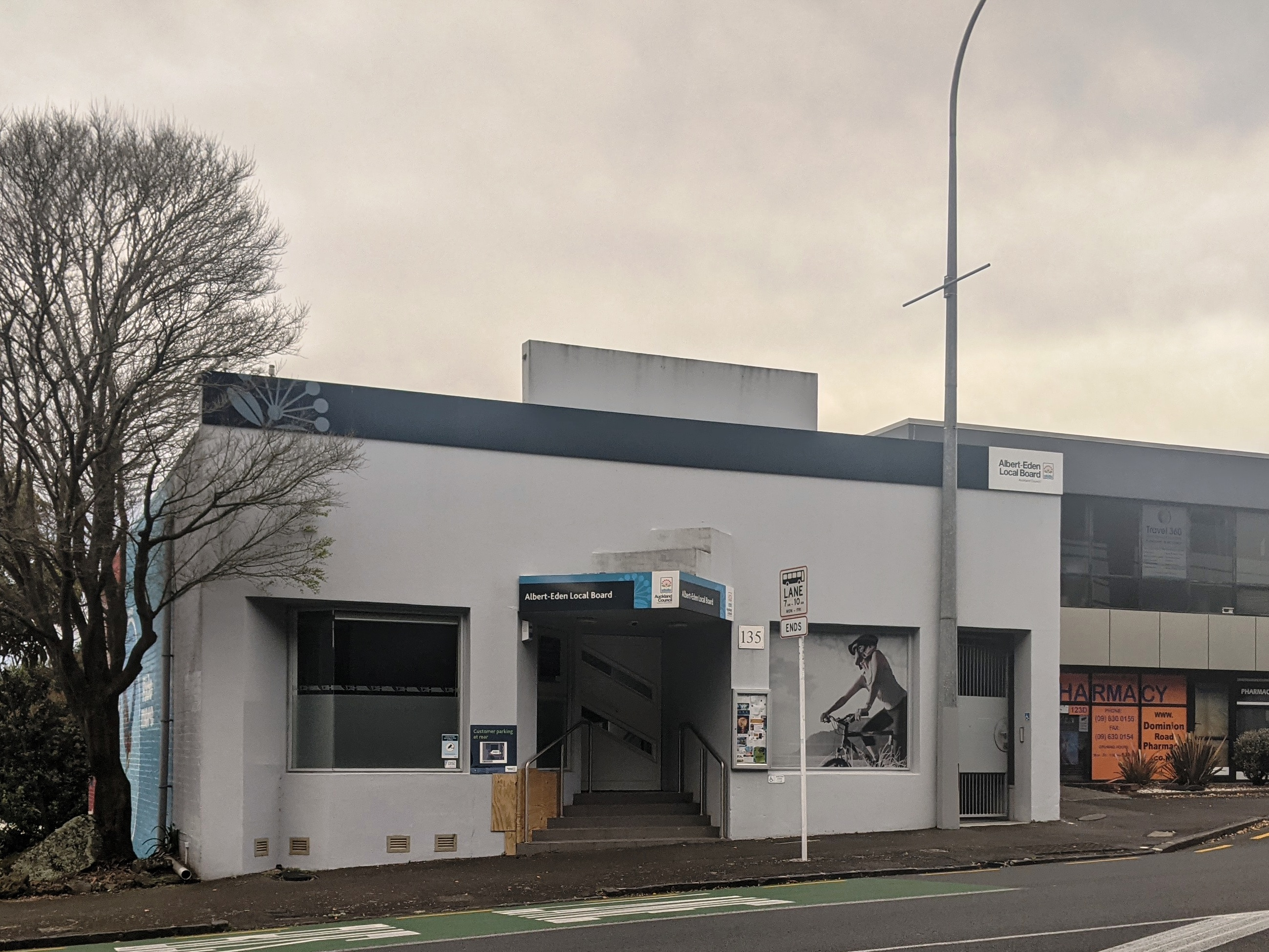
- The Albert-Eden Local Board offices

- Country: New Zealand
- Region: Auckland
- Territorial authority: Auckland Council
- Ward: Albert-Eden-Puketāpapa ward
- Legislated: 2010

Area
  - Land: 28.35 km^{2} (10.95 sq mi)

Population (June 2025)
  - Total: 102,900

Local Board Members

Leadership
- Chairperson: Margi Watson, City Vision
- Deputy chairperson: Christina Robertson, City Vision

Structure
- Seats: 8
- Political groups: City Vision (5); Communities and Residents (3)
- Length of term: 3 years

Elections
- Last election: 2025
- Next election: 2028

Meeting place
- 114 Dominion Road, Mt Eden

The Albert-Eden Local Board is one of the 21 local boards of the Auckland Council, and is one of the two boards overseen by the council's Albert-Eden-Puketāpapa ward councillors.

The Albert-Eden board, named after the two volcanic cones in the board area: Mount Albert and Mount Eden, covers the suburbs of Balmoral, Epsom, Greenlane, Kingsland, Morningside, Mount Albert, Mount Eden, Owairaka, Point Chevalier, Sandringham, and Waterview.

The board is governed by eight board members elected from two subdivisions: four from the Owairaka subdivision (western half of the board area), and four from the Maungawhau subdivision (eastern half). The first board members were elected with the nationwide local elections on Saturday 9 October 2010; the local board's second election closed on 12 October 2013.

== Geography ==
The area include the suburbs of Greenlane, Epsom, Mt Eden, Balmoral, Sandringham, Kingsland, Morningside, Owairaka, Mount Albert, Waterview and Point Chevalier. It is a high density residential area with strong transport connections.

== Population ==
Albert-Eden Local Board Area covers 28.35 km^{2} (10.95 sq mi) and had an estimated population of 102,900 as of June 2025, with a population density of 3,630 people per km^{2}.

Historical population
Year	Pop.	±% p.a.
2006	90,978	—
2013	94,695	+0.57%
2018	98,622	+0.82%
2023	96,630	−0.41%

Albert-Eden had a population of 96,630 in the 2023 New Zealand census, a decrease of 1,992 people (−2.0%) since the 2018 census, and an increase of 1,935 people (2.0%) since the 2013 census. There were 47,265 males, 48,708 females and 657 people of other genders in 33,300 dwellings. 6.1% of people identified as LGBTIQ+. The median age was 35.8 years (compared with 38.1 years nationally). There were 15,429 people (16.0%) aged under 15 years, 23,328 (24.1%) aged 15 to 29, 46,323 (47.9%) aged 30 to 64, and 11,550 (12.0%) aged 65 or older.

People could identify as more than one ethnicity. The results were 58.0% European (Pākehā); 8.6% Māori; 8.6% Pasifika; 33.1% Asian; 3.5% Middle Eastern, Latin American and African New Zealanders (MELAA); and 1.6% other, which includes people giving their ethnicity as "New Zealander". English was spoken by 93.5%, Māori language by 2.0%, Samoan by 1.9%, and other languages by 30.1%. No language could be spoken by 1.8% (e.g. too young to talk). New Zealand Sign Language was known by 0.4%. The percentage of people born overseas was 40.8, compared with 28.8% nationally.

Religious affiliations were 27.1% Christian, 5.2% Hindu, 2.7% Islam, 0.3% Māori religious beliefs, 2.2% Buddhist, 0.4% New Age, 0.2% Jewish, and 1.7% other religions. People who answered that they had no religion were 54.9%, and 5.3% of people did not answer the census question.

Of those at least 15 years old, 37,746 (46.5%) people had a bachelor's or higher degree, 28,590 (35.2%) had a post-high school certificate or diploma, and 14,865 (18.3%) people exclusively held high school qualifications. The median income was $50,600, compared with $41,500 nationally. 16,338 people (20.1%) earned over $100,000 compared to 12.1% nationally. The employment status of those at least 15 was that 44,952 (55.4%) people were employed full-time, 10,920 (13.4%) were part-time, and 2,526 (3.1%) were unemployed.

== Economy ==
As of 2018 36% of people were employed in professional roles, making it the largest source of employment in the local board area. 19.9% of people were managers, 10.3% were clerical and administrative workers, and 9.3% were sales workers. 8.7% of Albert-Eden residents were technicians and trade workers.

== 2025-2028 term ==
The current board members for the 2025-2028 term, elected at the 2025 local elections, are:

Name	Affiliation	Subdivision	Position
Margi Watson	City Vision	Ōwairaka	Chairperson
Christina Robertson	City Vision	Ōwairaka	Deputy Chairperson
Kendyl Smith	Communities and Residents	Maungawhau	Board member
Jack Tan	Communities and Residents	Maungawhau	Board member
Jose Fowler	Communities and Residents	Maungawhau	Board member
Emma McInnes	City Vision	Ōwairaka	Board member
Jacqui Tay	City Vision	Ōwairaka	Board member
Michelle Thorp	City Vision	Maungawhau	Board member

== 2022-2025 term ==
The current board members for the 2022-2025 term, elected at the 2022 local elections, are:

Name	Ticket (if any)	Subdivision	Position
Kendyl Smith	Communities and Residents	Maungawhau	Chairperson
Margi Watson	City Vision	Owairaka	Deputy Chairperson
Julia Maskill	City Vision	Owairaka	Board member
Christina Robertson	City Vision	Owairaka	Board member
Jack Tan	Communities and Residents	Maungawhau	Board member
José Fowler	Communities and Residents	Maungawhau	Board member
Rex Smith	Communities and Residents	Maungawhau	Board member
Liv Roe	City Vision	Owairaka	Board member

== 2019–2022 term ==
The board members for the 2019–2022 term, elected at the 2019 local body elections, were:

Benjamin Lee, C&R – Communities and Residents, (6223 votes)
Margi Watson, City Vision, (5967 votes)
Rachel Langton, C&R – Communities and Residents, (5910 votes)
Lee Corrick, C&R – Communities and Residents, (5639 votes)
Kendyl Smith, C&R – Communities and Residents, (5439 votes)
Julia Maskill, City Vision, (5166 votes)
Christina Robertson, City Vision, (5116 votes)
Graeme Easte, City Vision, (4653 votes)
