= Mike Lee (New Zealand politician) =

New Zealand politician

Councillor Mike Lee
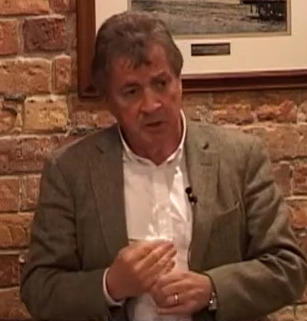
- Lee in 2011

Waitematā and Gulf Ward councillor
- Incumbent
- Assumed office 28 October 2022
- Preceded by: Pippa Coom
- In office 31 October 2010 – 12 October 2019
- Preceded by: Position created
- Succeeded by: Pippa Coom

Chairman of the Auckland Regional Council
- In office 2004 – 31 October 2010
- Succeeded by: Position abolished

Personal details
- Party: Independent
- Other political affiliations: Alliance Party, City Vision (formerly)
- Website: Mike Lee's blog

Michael Edward Lee is a New Zealand local government politician. He has been the Councillor for Waitematā and Gulf on Auckland Council since October 2022, an office he previously held from 2010 to 2019. He was a member of the Auckland Regional Council from 1992 to 2010 and was its final chair from 2004 to 2010.

== Political career ==
=== Auckland Regional Council ===
Lee was first elected to the Auckland Regional Council as an Alliance candidate in a by-election in 1992. He was re-elected as a councillor at every election thereafter until the regional council's dissolution in 2010.

He held the position of parks chairman (the council managed a number of regional parks), and oversaw the acquisition of substantial further parkland by the council during his time. He succeeded in opposing the privatisation of Ports of Auckland. He wrote his MSc thesis on such matters as land titles on Hauraki Gulf islands. In 2004 he was elected as chair of the regional council and held that position until 2010. Before becoming chair of the council, Lee was at times called a 'maverick' for opposing its more conservative members.

One of his key projects in the 2000s was successfully pushing forward the electrification of Auckland's rail network, succeeded by his support for the construction of the City Rail Link tunnel to increase the capacity of the rail system, both projects often against strong opposition from national government. Lee was also instrumental in a campaign that resulted in the reopening of the Onehunga Branch rail line to passenger traffic, allowing services to begin on the Onehunga Line in 2010.

While on the regional council, Lee contested election to Parliament in Rodney in the 1996 election as an Alliance Party candidate and came second after National's Lockwood Smith.

=== Auckland Council ===
Auckland Council
Years	Ward	Affiliation
2010–2013	Waitematā and Gulf	Independent
2013–2016	Waitematā and Gulf	Independent
2016–2019	Waitematā and Gulf	None
2022–present	Waitematā and Gulf	Auckland Independents

With the amalgamation of the Regional Council into the Auckland Council in 2010, Lee was elected in the Waitematā and Gulf ward. He served three terms as an independent, left-leaning councillor. He was chair of the transport committee from 2010 to 2016 and was additionally appointed as a director of the council's independent transport authority, Auckland Transport.

He was critical of the form of the new council as created by the Fifth National Government (though he supported the creation of the council itself), and especially of the creation of large business-like council-controlled organisations (CCOs) to manage substantial parts of the council-owned assets and services at arm's length from actual council control.

Lee was re-elected in the 2016 Auckland elections, despite a challenge from Bill Ralston. He intended to retire after two terms but changed his mind in June 2019, announcing he would contest the 2019 Auckland elections. By this time, the City Vision ticket, which had endorsed Lee in 2016 by not fielding a candidate, had selected Pippa Coom as its candidate in March 2019 on the understanding that Lee would not stand again. Lee finished second to Coom in the October 2019 election.

Lee contested the 2022 Auckland Council elections in the Waitematā and Gulf ward against Coom. The centre-right political group Communities and Residents endorsed him by declining to stand a candidate. In what was considered one of the biggest upsets of the 2022 Auckland elections, Lee defeated Coom by a margin of 1161 votes and became the councillor for Waitematā and Gulf once again.

He again won re-election in the 2025 local elections.

== Private life ==
Lee was married to Sandra Lee-Vercoe. They separated in 1992.

Lee completed an MSc thesis entitled New Zealand, the 10,000 island archipelago at the University of Auckland in 1996 – it has not been published. He spent 12 years researching and writing Navigators & Naturalists: French Exploration of New Zealand and the South Seas (1769–1824), which was published in 2018.

Lee has lived on Waiheke Island since 1979.

Political offices
Preceded by Gwen Bull	Chair of the Auckland Regional Council; 2004–2010	Office abolished
