= Pippa Coom =

New Zealand politician

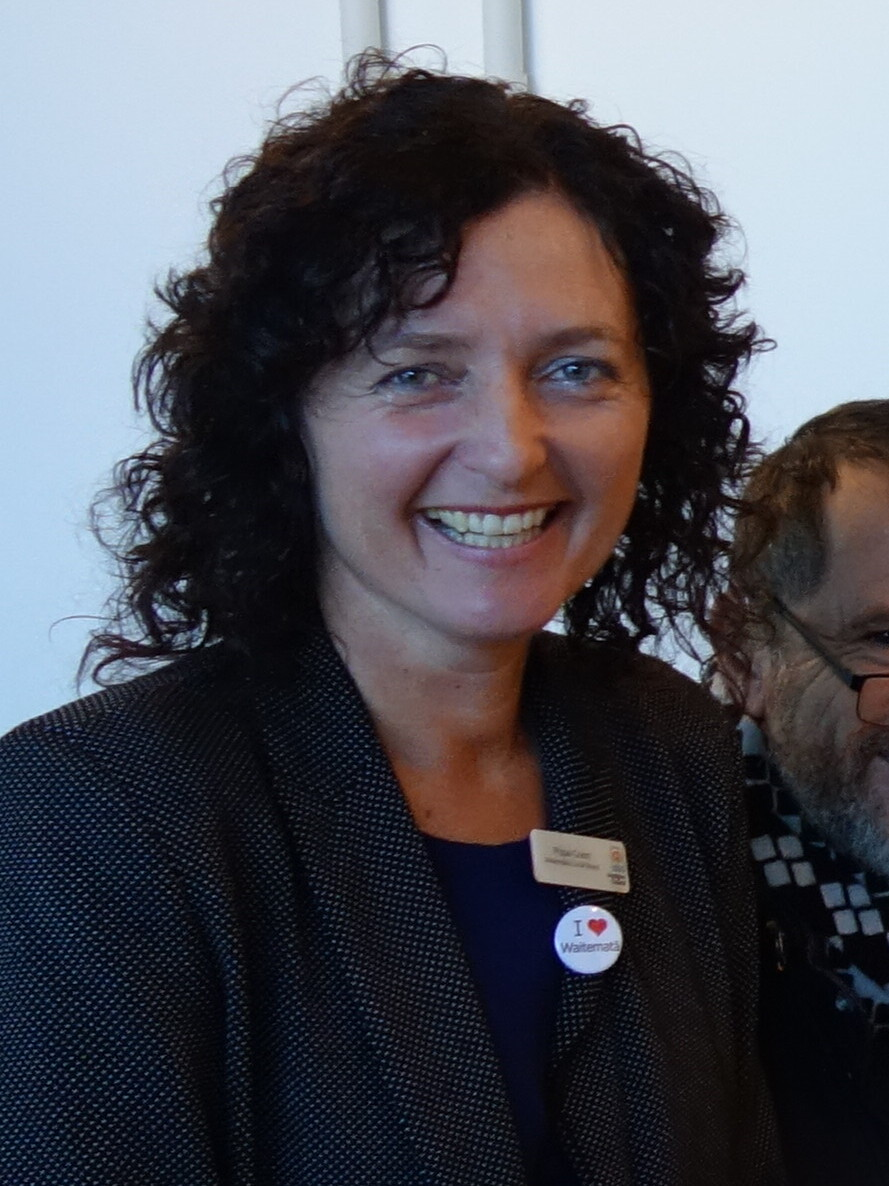
- Coom in 2016

Waitematā and Gulf Councillor
- In office 2019–2022
- Preceded by: Mike Lee
- Succeeded by: Mike Lee

Personal details
- Party: City Vision

Pippa Coom is a New Zealand politician, who is a former councillor on the Auckland Council and former chair of the Waitematā Local Board.

== Early life ==
Previous to succeeding in her bid for a Local Board seat, she worked as a lawyer for Vector, and campaigned unsuccessfully for a seat on the Board of the Auckland Energy Consumer Trust.

== Political career ==
Auckland Council
Years	Ward	Affiliation
2019–2022	Waitematā and Gulf	City Vision

Coom was elected in 2010 on the City Vision ticket. She was re-elected in 2013, getting the highest number of votes of all candidates in her board area. Coom was again re-elected to the Waitematā Local Board at the 2016 Auckland elections, and became chair of the board.

Among her interests, she supports increased cycling for transport in Auckland, and has been involved in organizing events such as the 'Cycle Style Gala' with Cycle Action Auckland, and was a coordinator for Frocks on Bikes women cycling events. She is also involved in environmental groups like Grey Lynn 2030.

In March 2019, it was announced that Coom would be City Vision's governing body candidate for Councillor of the Waitematā and Gulf ward, and she eventually unseated the incumbent Mike Lee with 6,581 votes, a majority of 324. Coom ran again as the Waitematā and Gulf ward councillor in the 2022 Auckland local elections, however lost to Mike Lee.

== Awards ==
For her work with Cycle Action Auckland and the Grey Lynn Farmer's Market, she won the Sustainable Business Network "Sustainability Champion Award (2011)".
