= Waitematā and Gulf ward =

- Ward of Auckland
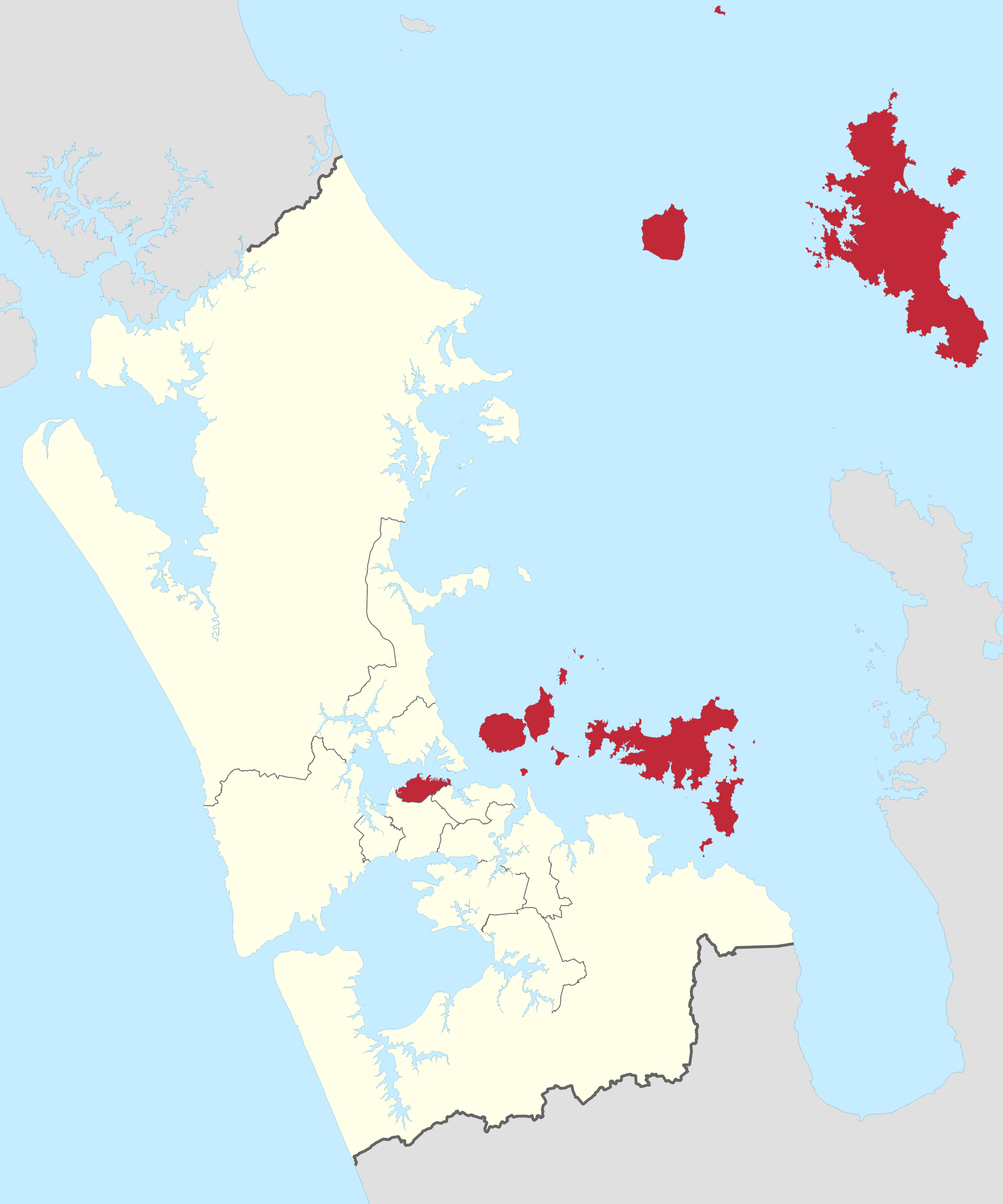
- Country: New Zealand
- Island: North Island
- Region: Auckland Region

Area
  - Land: 489.05 km^{2} (188.82 sq mi)

Population (June 2025)
  - Total: 80,500
  - Density: 165/km^{2} (426/sq mi)

The Waitematā and Gulf ward is an Auckland Council ward which elects one councillor and covers the area of the Great Barrier, Waiheke, and Waitematā local boards. The current councillor is Mike Lee.

== Demographics ==
Waitematā and Gulf ward covers 489.05 km^{2} (188.82 sq mi) with as estimated population of 80,500 as of June 2025, with a population density of 163 people per km^{2}.

Historical population
Year	Pop.	±% p.a.
2006	71,619	—
2013	70,170	−0.29%
2018	75,816	+1.56%
2023	74,130	−0.45%
The 2006 population is for a larger area of 494.61 km^{2}. Source:

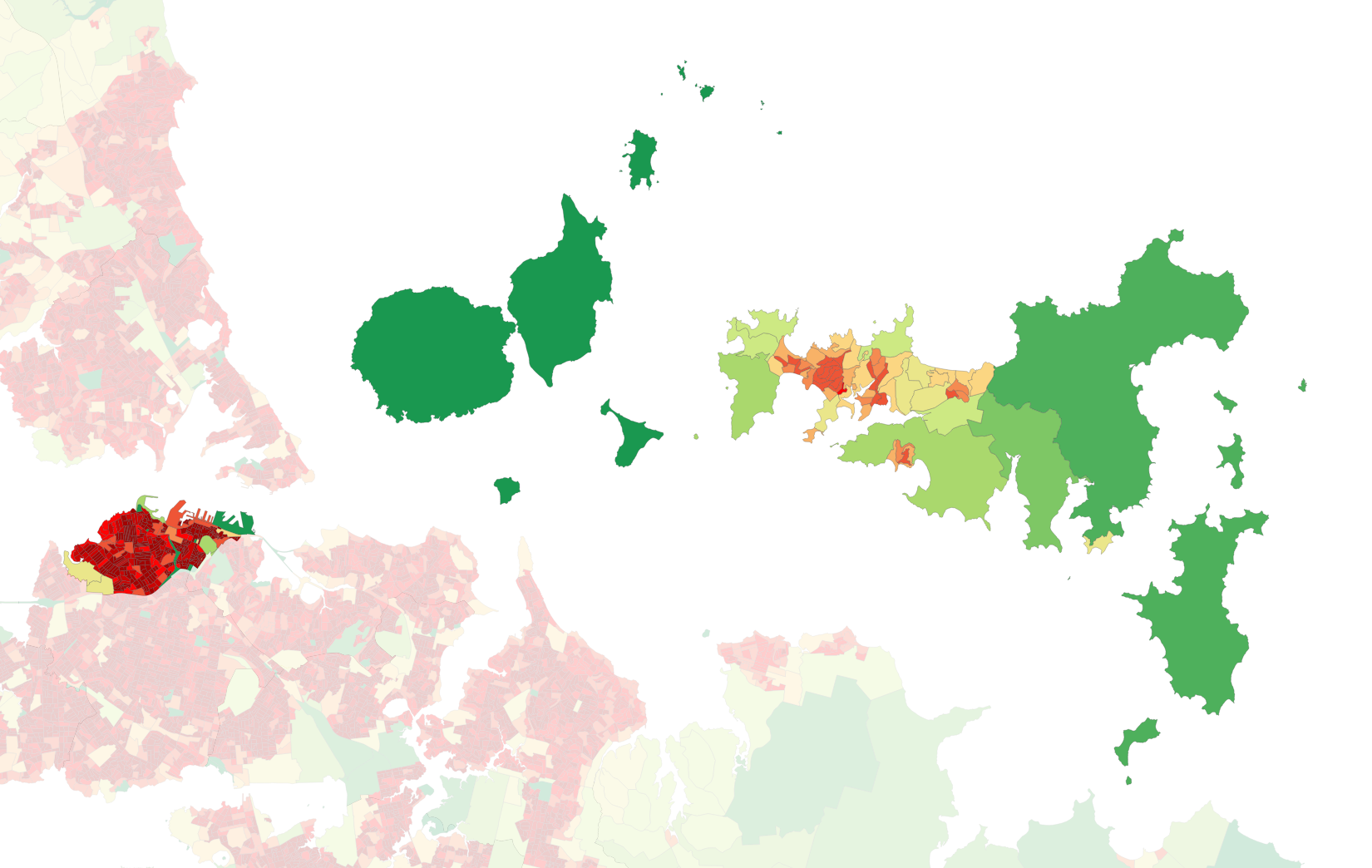
Population density in the 2023 census. Great Barrier Island is not included in this map.

Waitematā and Gulf ward had a population of 74,130 in the 2023 New Zealand census, a decrease of 1,686 people (−2.2%) since the 2018 census, and an increase of 3,960 people (5.6%) since the 2013 census. There were 36,969 males, 36,555 females and 609 people of other genders in 34,902 dwellings. 9.5% of people identified as LGBTIQ+. The median age was 34.4 years (compared with 38.1 years nationally). There were 7,074 people (9.5%) aged under 15 years, 22,491 (30.3%) aged 15 to 29, 36,162 (48.8%) aged 30 to 64, and 8,403 (11.3%) aged 65 or older.

People could identify as more than one ethnicity. The results were 63.9% European (Pākehā); 9.6% Māori; 6.0% Pasifika; 26.9% Asian; 4.8% Middle Eastern, Latin American and African New Zealanders (MELAA); and 1.7% other, which includes people giving their ethnicity as "New Zealander". English was spoken by 96.3%, Māori language by 2.4%, Samoan by 1.0%, and other languages by 29.2%. No language could be spoken by 1.3% (e.g. too young to talk). New Zealand Sign Language was known by 0.3%. The percentage of people born overseas was 45.2, compared with 28.8% nationally.

Religious affiliations were 23.7% Christian, 3.8% Hindu, 1.8% Islam, 0.5% Māori religious beliefs, 2.1% Buddhist, 0.6% New Age, 0.3% Jewish, and 1.8% other religions. People who answered that they had no religion were 59.9%, and 5.6% of people did not answer the census question.

Of those at least 15 years old, 30,999 (46.2%) people had a bachelor's or higher degree, 24,039 (35.8%) had a post-high school certificate or diploma, and 12,018 (17.9%) people exclusively held high school qualifications. The median income was $48,100, compared with $41,500 nationally. 13,692 people (20.4%) earned over $100,000 compared to 12.1% nationally. The employment status of those at least 15 was that 36,633 (54.6%) people were employed full-time, 9,591 (14.3%) were part-time, and 2,595 (3.9%) were unemployed.

== Councillors ==
Waitematā and Gulf ward councillor of Auckland
- Incumbent; Mike Lee since 2022
- Term length: Three years
- Inaugural holder: Mike Lee
- Formation: 1 November 2010
- Website: www.aucklandcouncil.govt.nz

Election	Councillors elected	Affiliation	Votes	Notes
2010	Mike Lee	Independent	11436	
2013	Mike Lee	Independent	8886	
2016	Mike Lee	None	9424	
2019	Pippa Coom	City Vision	6581	
2022	Mike Lee	Auckland Independents	9415	Defeated Pippa Coom by 1,161 votes
2025	Mike Lee	Auckland Independents		

== Election results ==
Election results for the Waitematā and Gulf ward:

=== 2025 election results ===
Waitematā and Gulf ward
Affiliation	Candidate	Votes	%
Independent	Mike Lee^{†}	7,991	36.87
City Vision	Patrick Reynolds	6,135	28.30
Independent	Genevieve Sage	3,594	16.58
Independent	Ian Loan	1,268	5.85
Independent	Selena Renner	997	4.60
Independent	Lester Bryant	735	3.39
Informal		37	0.17
Blank		918	4.24
Turnout		21,675	33.83
Registered		64,073	
Independent hold			
^{†} incumbent

=== 2022 election results ===
	Name	Affiliation	Votes
1	Mike Lee	Auckland Independents	9415
	Pippa Coom	City Vision	8254
	Mike Burton	Rock the Vote	1032
	Andi Liu		636
Blank			11485
Informal			10

=== 2016 election results ===
	Name	Affiliation	Votes	%
1	Mike Lee		9,424	38.4%
	Bill Ralston	Independent	8,341	34.0%
	Rob Thomas	Independent	4,475	18.3%
Blank			2,254	9.2%
Informal			17	0.1%
Turnout			24,511	
