= Julie Fairey =

New Zealand politician

Councillor Julie Fairey

Albert-Eden-Puketāpapa ward Councillor
- Incumbent
- Assumed office 16 October 2022 Serving with Christine Fletcher
- Preceded by: Cathy Casey

Personal details
- Born: 1976 or 1977 (age 49–50)
- Party: City Vision
- Spouse: Michael Wood
- Children: 3

Julie Fairey (born 1976 or 1977) is a New Zealand politician who is an Auckland Councillor. In 2022, Fairey was elected as one of two councillors representing the Albert-Eden-Puketāpapa ward.

== Early life ==
Fairey was born in 1976 or 1977 Before becoming a local board member, she worked in early childhood education, and was active among education unions.

== Political career ==
Auckland Council
Years	Ward	Affiliation
2022–present	Albert-Eden-Puketāpapa	City Vision

Fairey ran unsuccessfully as the Alliance candidate for Epsom in 2002. She ran as a list candidate in 2005.

Fairey was elected to the Puketāpapa Local Board in the 2010 Auckland local board elections. She served as the chair of the board from 2013 to 2016, and as the deputy chair for the first half of the 2019–2022 term.

In the 2022 local body elections, Fairey was elected as one of two councillors for the Albert-Eden-Puketāpapa ward. She took office on 16 October 2022. In 2024, she was appointed deputy chair of the council's community committee.

Fairey won re-election as a councillor in the 2025 elections.

== Personal life ==
Fairey's spouse is Mount Roskill MP Michael Wood. Both ran campaigns as electorate MPs in 2002, and both were elected to the Puketāpapa Local Board in 2010.
