= The Trusts =

New Zealand alcohol retailer

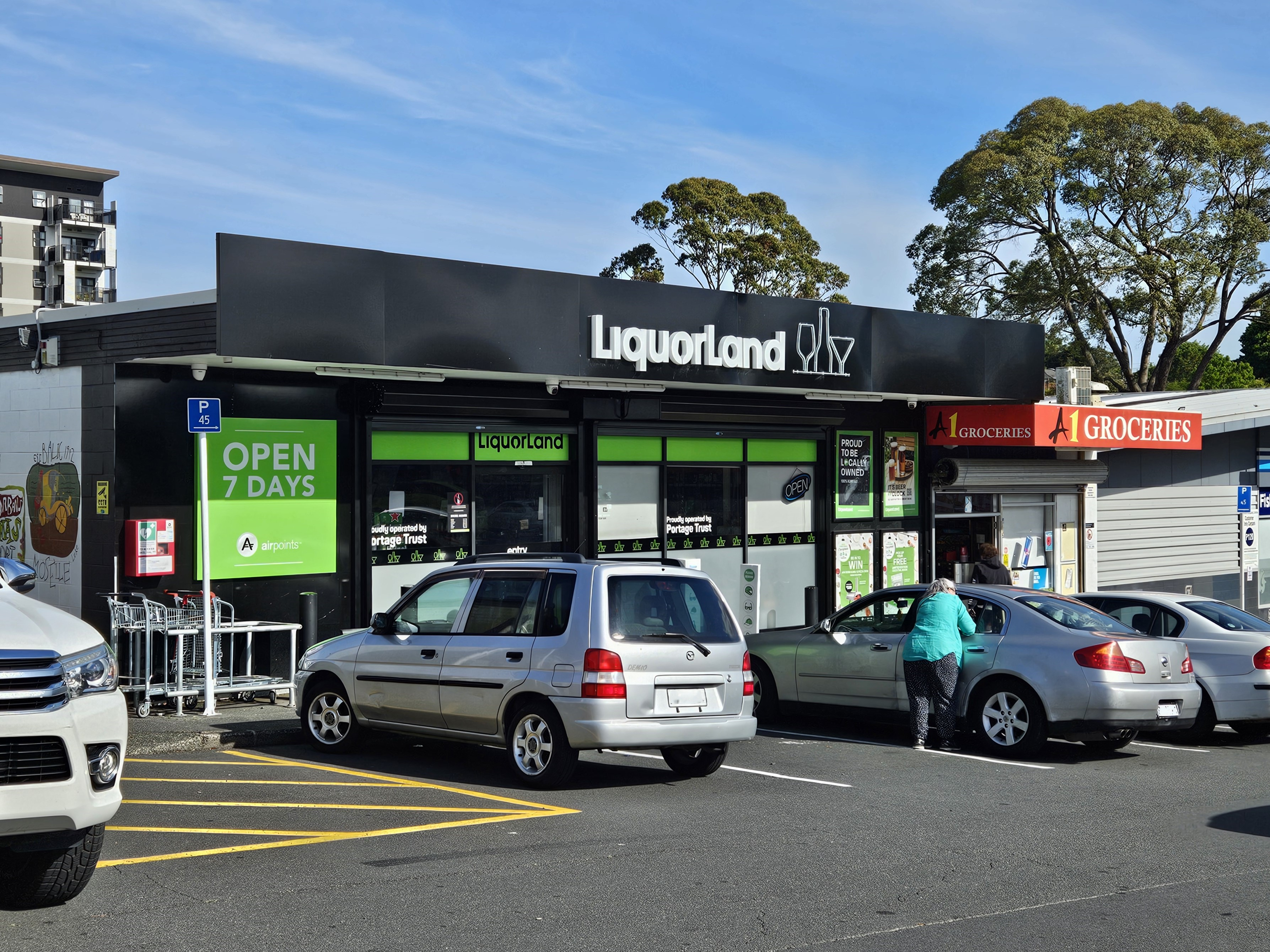
- LiquorLand Glen Eden, operated by the Portage Licensing Trust
- Industry: Retail, hospitality
- Headquarters: New Zealand
- Area served: West Auckland
- Products: Liquor stores
- Website: thetrusts.co.nz

The Trusts are a group of two community-owned organisations (licensing trusts) with a near monopoly on the sale of alcohol in West Auckland. They are one of the largest alcohol retailers in New Zealand.

The Portage Licensing Trust covers the areas bordered by New Lynn, Waikumete Cemetery, Glen Eden and Titirangi. The Waitākere Licensing Trust covers the communities around Glendene, Piha, Henderson, Te Atatū South, Te Atatū Peninsula and Whenuapai.

The Trusts operate all hotels, taverns and off-licenses in their districts. They operate 26 liquor stores, predominantly under either the LiquorLand or Super Liquor franchise.

The only other businesses permitted to sell alcohol are liquor stores that operated in the area before 1972, or businesses that make alcohol such as wineries and breweries.

Trustees are elected through local body elections, and surplus profits are returned to the community through grants, rebates, sponsorships and community initiatives. The monopoly of the Trusts can only be removed if a privately organised petition signed by at least 15% of all eligible voters forces a referendum, and at least 50% of all eligible voters on polling day.

== History ==
The Trusts were established in 1972 as a community-led initiative to control the sale of alcohol.

The Trusts Stadium, one of the Trust's most significant investments. opened in September 2004. It cost $28 million to complete but opened debt-free, with the Trusts providing $5 million. The stadium attracts hundreds of thousands of people every year, hosting a range of events, including concerts, sporting events and community gatherings.

Between July 2010 and June 2013, the Trusts invested $30.7 million from its gaming machines into local causes.

By 2013, the Trusts were generating $100 million a year in sales and employing 400 people.

In 2021, the Trusts reached an agreement with Foodstuffs to operate a new LiquorLand franchise and convert some of its existing West Liquor stores to LiquorLand franchisees.

In October 2021, an action group opposed to the Trusts said it almost had enough signatures to force a vote in the Waitākere Licensing Trust area. The group claimed the Trusts' monopoly was stopping bars and restaurants from establishing on the Te Atatū Peninsula. The petition failed after over half the signatures were discounted as being invalid.

The Trusts was the first New Zealand business to boycott Russian products in response to the Russian invasion of Ukraine. On 1 March 2022, it removed all Russian vodkas and beers from shelves, putting Ukrainian flags in their space. Foodstuffs introduced a similar policy in all other LiquorLand stores three days later.

Following a trial of four stores over 2021–2022, the Trusts announced in May 2023 that all its liquor stores would rebrand as either LiquorLand or Super Liquor and change to a franchise model.

== Trustees ==
The most recent election for trustees took place in 2025, wherein the following trustees were returned:

=== Portage Licensing Trust ===
Member(s)	Affiliation	Ward	Position
Greg Presland	Future West	Titirangi/Green Bay	President
Mark Graham	City Vision	Auckland City	Deputy President
Marcus Amosa	City Vision	Auckland City	Trustee
Margi Watson	City Vision	Auckland City	Trustee
Rob Hulse	Independent	New Lynn	Trustee
Michael Bain	Independent	New Lynn	Trustee
Michelle Hutton	Future West	Glen Eden	Trustee
Joe Bergin	Trusts Action Group	Glen Eden	Trustee
Ben Goodale	Trusts Action Group	Titirangi/Green Bay	Trustee
Belinda Allen	Independent	Kelston West	Trustee

=== Waitākere Licensing Trust ===
Member(s)	Affiliation	Ward	Position
Mark Allen	Future West	Waitākere	President
Brooke Loader	Labour	Te Atatū	Deputy President
Chris Carter	Labour	Te Atatū	Trustee
Ben Bergin	Trusts Action Group	Lincoln	Trustee
Linda Cooper	Trust Local	Lincoln	Trustee
Richard Ormiston	Trusts Action Group	Lincoln	Trustee
Will Flavell	Labour	Henderson	Trustee
