= Licensing trust =

Community-owned company with a government-authorised monopoly

Under New Zealand law, a licensing trust is a community-owned company with a government-authorised monopoly on the development of premises licensed for the sale of alcoholic beverages and associated accommodation in an area. This applies to both on-licence and off-licence sales.

The Invercargill Licensing Trust (ILT) in 1944 was the first such body, and remains the highest profile example. Most other trusts have been small by comparison, but several have now created a jointly owned management company, Trust House Limited, and the assets and payouts of this are very similar to that of the ILT.

The uniqueness of licensing trusts revolves around:

- A responsibility to enhance the well-being of their defined community;
- The distribution of (surplus) profits back to their communities;
- The provision of good, model facilities for the sale of alcohol, the provision of accommodation and meals, and gaming; (Note: Some trusts have broadened their business interests from the original alcohol-related activities. Supermarkets, housing, energy generation and property landlords are some of the ‘modern’ businesses. Gaming, a ‘sensitive’ product like alcohol, was added in the early 1990s. Sensitive in this sense means a service that should be provided with controls.)
- Accountability to the communities who own them.

In addition, there is an inherent responsibility to efficiently operate commercial businesses profitably.

Licensing trusts belong to the family of community enterprises that are part of the third sector, (Note: The market economy, non-market economy where the principle of redistribution is governed by the welfare state, and the civil and solidarity-based economy are generally regarded as the three sectors. The latter has a number of names: the civil society, the non-profit sector, the social/solidarity based economy…) a hybrid form of organisation that crosses over sectors, a mixture of market orientation and solidarity (community support). They may be defined as businesses whose primary goals are to support the well-being of their community principally through reinvesting profits generated from their trading activities either in the business and/or in support of community activities, rather than being driven to maximise profits.

The only "essential" liquor outlets allowed to stay open during the COVID-19 pandemic were the ones in trust areas where they had a monopoly on liquor sales and local supermarkets could not sell beer or wine.

== History ==
=== Context ===
In the early history of New Zealand, living conditions were often difficult, and hard drinking and the often consequential drunkenness can be seen as a reaction to the times. Abuses, which were common during the nineteenth century, inevitably brought increasing restrictions through legislation.

These abuses gave rise in the late 1800s to the temperance and prohibition movements.

In 1893, the Alcoholic Liquors Sale Control Act aligned licensing districts with parliamentary electorates. Licensing polls were to be held with each general election. There were now three options to choose from. These were "continuance of the status quo", reduction of the number of liquor licences by 25 percent, and "local no-licence" which would prevent public sale of alcohol within that electorate. Continuance and reduction only needed a majority, but local no licence needed three-fifths majority.

What resulted was that a number of areas voted for a prohibition on alcohol sales. Clutha was the first in 1894, Ashburton and Mataura followed in 1902, Invercargill, Oamaru, and Grey Lynn in 1905, and Bruce, Wellington South, Wellington suburbs, Masterton, Ohinemuri and Eden in 1908. 1911 saw the peak of the prohibition movement when it failed by only 20,000 votes to carry national prohibition. Thereafter the strength of the prohibition movement faded. But it was 1999 before the last "dry" areas disappeared.

=== Emergence of licensing trusts ===
On 25 September 1943 the voters of Invercargill, by 8,015 votes to 6,342, restored the sale of liquor within the borough. Prohibition had existed for 38 years and the voting, on the face of it, was apparently a clear indication there was a mood for change. But controversy immediately arose. The 60% threshold necessary to achieve change had only been achieved with the overwhelming support (81.5%) of the soldiers’ votes overseas. The ‘domestic’ vote had been similar to the previous triennial polls at 56.8%. There were suggestions that the voting papers of the soldiers should be returned to New Zealand and recounted. But it was found they had been destroyed in the Middle East. While a good deal of inferences were thrown about, and the Prime Minister, Peter Fraser, offered explanations and a report to Parliament, there was no evidence that what had occurred in destroying the papers was anything other than a misunderstanding. Given the circumstances of the soldiers, it was entirely reasonable that they would give overwhelming support.

In Invercargill there was a mood of enthusiasm to start anew, but there were also considerable concerns. In the end because the community could not make up its mind, the Government decided. On 27 March 1944 the Government announced that they intended to pursue legislation that would set up a trust that would be "...a body corporate, for the purpose of providing for the establishment of model hotels in the Invercargill licensing district …in the interests of the public well-being, and of providing for the sale of intoxicating liquor in the district and to provide for the distribution of the profits for public purposes."

The New Zealand parliamentary debates during the introduction of the first licensing trust legislation suggest the New Zealand legislation was based on the British "Carlisle Scheme" that had been established during the First World War on the Scottish border, but there were also significant differences.. Rex Mason was Minister of Justice from 1935 to 1949 (and again from 1957 to 1960) and responsible for the licensing legislation. He shepherded the licensing trusts acts through Parliament, and was strongly committed to the concept of licensing trust.

The Invercargill Licensing Trust Act 1944 came into force on 17 April 1944. The Masterton Licensing Trust Act followed in December 1947, and the Licensing Amendment Act (with provision for a further poll on trust control) in 1949.

== Trusts established and demised ==
30 licensing trusts were established, and 18 remained active as of 2017:

Licensing trust	Date established	Date disestablished	Note
Ashburton	1949	2021	Converted into a community trust
Birkenhead	1967		
Clutha	1955		
Geraldine	1949		
Invercargill	1944		
Johnsonville	1969	2005	
Masterton	1947	2016	Converted into a community trust
Mataura	1955		
Mount Albert	1972	1986	Area subsumed into the Portage Licensing Trust area
Oamaru	1961		
Porirua	1955	2007	Converted into a community trust
Portage	1972		
Terawhiti	1975	?	Dissolved
Stokes Valley	1971	1971	Dissolved later that same year
Waitākere	1972		
Wellington South	1972	2001	Ceased operating in 1998
Cheviot	1954		
Flaxmere	1975		
Hawarden	1970	2019	Liquidated
Hornby	1958	?	Dissolved
Mount Wellington	1952		
Orewa	1970	?	Dissolved
Otara	1969	?	Dissolved
Otumoetai	1971	1998	
Papatoetoe	1968	2006	
Parakai	1969	2013	Converted into a community trust
Pokeno	1974	1994	
Rimutaka	1970		
Te Kauwhata	1968		
Wainuiomata	1968	2013	Ceased operating around 2003, and dissolved by court order in 2013
Wiri	1969		

While not all licensing trusts have survived, (Note: Though the failure rate has been no more than that of private enterprise companies) the 19 that continued to actively trade in 2008 held assets of NZ$313 million, generated revenue of $357m, profits of $42m, and donated support to their community of $33m. The collective results of the trusts were presented to the Law Commission in October 2009 as part of a submission, and showed that licensing trusts at that time operated 133 licensed premises which include hotels totalling 890 accommodation units, and such diverse activities as supermarkets, a housing estate, a hydro-electric power scheme, and property portfolios.

Poor management and governance have been identified as the main reasons for the demise of many of the now dissolved licensing trusts.

== Elections and accountability ==
The functions of a licensing trust are specified in Section 305 of the "Sale and Supply of Alcohol Act" of 2012.

Trustees for each licensing trust are elected by the community every three years at the triennial local government elections. Generally six trustees are elected, but some trusts with a ward system may have up to nine. The elective nature of governance provides accountability and a direct link to the community. However, elections for the position of trustee are often poorly contested.

Areas do not automatically vote on whether to keep trusts, if they have them, or to establish them if they do not. However, if the trust's board so resolve, or 15% of the electors in a trust area petition for it, a referendum will be held on whether to continue the trust. If 50% of electors vote to abolish it, the trust is disestablished and liquor sales revert to the rules that apply to most of the country.

The same process allows new licensing trusts to be created upon the petition of 15% of the electors in an area, and this would happen without any further referendum or input from the remaining 85% of electors. However, no new trusts have been established since the liberalisation of liquor laws in 1989.

Lincensing trusts are considered by the Office of the Auditor-General to be "probably the least scrutinised part of the public sector".

As they are not listed with the Companies Office, the accounts of lincensing trusts are not able to be easily scrutinised by the public, and they have often been late in filing their accounts with the Auditor-General.

Further, as no central government agency, select committee or local authority has responsibility for monitoring them, there is no government department to which the public can raise complaints when they have issues with the trusts. The only means through which the public can oversee the trusts is by making a request under the Local Government Official Information and Meetings Act 1987.

== Trustees ==
=== Auckland ===
Birkenhead Licensing Trust (2025–2028)

Members	Affiliation	Position
Paula Gillon	Independent	President
Shane Prince	Independent	Deputy President
Merran Sarah Brockie-David	Independent	Trustee
Rochelle Lee-Warren	Independent	Trustee
Marilyn Nicholls	Independent	Trustee
vacant (Note: As there were fewer candidates than vacancies for the Birkenhead Licensing Trust at the 2025 local elections, a by-election to fill the remaining position will be held on 3 March 2026.)		Trustee

Mount Wellington Licensing Trust (2025–2028)

Member(s)	Affiliation	Position
Nerissa Henry	Labour	President
Tabetha Elliott	Communities and Residents	Trustee
Megan Philippa Clark	Labour	Trustee
Allyson Wood	Independent	Trustee
Troy Elliott	Communities and Residents	Trustee
Will Matthews	Labour	Trustee

Portage Licensing Trust (2025–2028)

Member(s)	Affiliation	Ward	Position
Greg Presland	Future West	Titirangi/Green Bay	President
Mark Graham	City Vision	Auckland City	Deputy President
Marcus Amosa	City Vision	Auckland City	Trustee
Margi Watson	City Vision	Auckland City	Trustee
Rob Hulse	Independent	New Lynn	Trustee
Michael Bain	Independent	New Lynn	Trustee
Michelle Hutton	Future West	Glen Eden	Trustee
Joe Bergin	Trusts Action Group	Glen Eden	Trustee
Ben Goodale	Trusts Action Group	Titirangi/Green Bay	Trustee
Belinda Allen	Independent	Kelston West	Trustee

Waitākere Licensing Trust (2025–2028)

Member(s)	Affiliation	Ward	Position
Mark Allen	Future West	Waitākere	President
Brooke Loader	Labour	Te Atatū	Deputy President
Chris Carter	Labour	Te Atatū	Trustee
Ben Bergin	Trusts Action Group	Lincoln	Trustee
Linda Cooper	Trust Local	Lincoln	Trustee
Richard Ormiston	Trusts Action Group	Lincoln	Trustee
Will Flavell	Labour	Henderson	Trustee

Wiri Licensing Trust (2025–2028)

Member(s)	Affiliation	Position
Brian Blake	Manurewa Action Team	Chair
Daniel Newman	Manurewa Action Team	Deputy Chair
Matt Winiata	Manurewa Action Team	Trustee
Rangi McLean	Manurewa Action Team	Trustee
Glenn Murphy	Manurewa Action Team	Trustee
Heather Andrew	Manurewa Action Team	Trustee

=== Waikato ===
Te Kauwhata Licensing Trust (2025–2028) (Note: The candidates for the trustees of the Te Kauwhata Licensing Trust were all returned unopposed in the 2025 local elections.)

Member(s)	Affiliation	Position
Scott Alexander Bovaird	Independent	Chair
Ross Alexander Caird	Independent	Trustee
Mohan Singh	Independent	Trustee
Casey van der Star	Independent	Trustee
vacant (Note: As the number of candidates was less than the number of vacancies for the Te Kauwhata Licensing Trust at the 2025 local elections, a by-election to fill the remaining vacancies was to be held on 3 March 2026. However, the Trust approached the responsible Minister to request that the by-election be avoided by instead co-opting two further members from the community.)		Trustee
vacant		Trustee

=== Hawke's Bay ===
Flaxmere Licensing Trust (2025–2028) (Note: The candidates for the trustees of the Flaxmere Licensing Trust were all returned unopposed in the 2025 local elections.)

Member(s)	Affiliation
Melissa Collins	Independent
Martha Greening	Independent
Chrissy Hokianga	Independent
Warwick Howie	Independent
Bert Lincoln	Independent
Lisa Pohatu	Independent

=== Greater Wellington ===
Rimutaka Licensing Trust (2025–2028) (Note: The candidates for the trustees of the Rimutaka Licensing Trust were all returned unopposed in the 2025 local elections.)

Member(s)	Affiliation	Position
Tom Jones	Independent	Chair
Bruce Bold	Independent	Trustee
Bob Hanlon	Independent	Trustee
Colleen Hilder	Independent	Trustee
Sean Nearey	Independent	Trustee
vacant (Note: The number of candidates was less than the number of vacancies for the Rimutaka Licensing Trust at the 2025 local elections. A by-election was to be held to fill the vacancy, but following advice from the Minister of Justice the by-election was cancelled. The trust will instead continue the 2025-2028 term with only 5 members.)		Trustee

=== Canterbury ===
Cheviot Licensing Trust (2025–2028) (Note: The candidates for the trustees of the Cheviot Licensing Trust were all returned unopposed in the 2025 local elections.)

Member(s)	Affiliation
Steve Coleman	Independent
Murray Crampton	Independent
Geoff Denton	Independent
Phil Duncan	Independent
Susan Harrison	Independent
Frayne Hazeldine	Independent

Geraldine Licensing Trust (2025–2028)

Member(s)	Affiliation	Position
Nicky Donkers	Independent	President
Jo Hewson	Independent	Trustee
Dan Cummings	Independent	Trustee
John Wilson	Independent	Trustee
Sally Houston	Independent	Trustee
Rosie Woods	Independent	Trustee

=== Otago ===
Oamaru Licensing Trust (2025–2028)

Member(s)	Affiliation
Denise McMillan	Independent
Ali Brosnan	Independent
Peter Bond	Independent
John Bringans	Independent
John Clements	Independent

Clutha Licensing Trust (2025–2028) (Note: The candidates for the trustees of the Clutha Licensing Trust were all returned unopposed in the 2025 local elections.)

Member(s)	Affiliation	Position
Steve Morris	Independent	President
Mike Cochrane	Independent	Trustee
Sarah Hayward	Independent	Trustee
Jason Lyders	Independent	Trustee
Jared McPhee	Independent	Trustee

=== Southland ===
Mataura Licensing Trust (2025–2028)

Member(s)	Affiliation (if any)	Ward	Position
Vince Aynsley	Independent	4	President
Craig Marshall	Independent	2	Deputy President
Horace McAuley	Independent	1	Trustee
Jimmy Allison	Independent	2	Trustee
Paul Henry	Independent	2	Trustee
Brendon (Moe) Murray	Independent	3	Trustee
Jeannine Cunningham	Independent	5	Trustee
Marc Robertson	Independent	6	Trustee
Todd Lyders	Independent	7	Trustee

Invercargill Licensing Trust (2025–2028)

Members	Affiliation	Position
Paddy O'Brien	Independent	President
Suzanne Prentice	Independent	Deputy President
Angela Newell	Independent	Trustee
Graham Hawkes	Independent	Trustee
Sharee Carey	Independent	Trustee
Nick Jeffrey	Independent	Trustee

== Community support donations ==
The original licensing trust legislation provided an enabling clause to donate money back to their communities in support of the promotion, advancement, or encouragement of education, science, literature, art, physical welfare, and any other cultural and recreational purposes, and any other philanthropic purposes.

=== Masterton Licensing Trust ===
In 1968, the then Mayor of Masterton advocated to the Masterton Licensing Trust that the wasteland on the edge of the town, bordered by two rivers, be converted into a recreational lake and parklands. Over the years since, the Trust has supported the Henley Lake scheme with many donations totalling hundreds of thousand dollars so that today, a lake of 14 hectares, parklands with walking and running tracks, wildlife reserves, and public facilities (for example, a Men's Shed) support activities generating many hundreds of visitors daily.

In the past ten years, Trust House, the trading arm of the Masterton Licensing Trust and other trusts, has distributed $31.150 million to its communities; with the 2016 charitable distribution being $3,483,000.

=== Mataura Licensing Trust ===
For 56 years, the Mataura Licensing Trust has been investing in its community, returning profits to its customers and creating jobs. It has been instrumental in future-proofing sporting amenities, as well as supporting the arts, education and destination events, all of which directly or indirectly bolster the local economy. Gore's multi-sports complex is the flagship of its endeavours – a venue featuring the latest water-turf technology for hockey, a four-court event centre, a short-course Olympic ice skating rink and a two-pool aquatic centre established in partnership with local Government and sports groups. The complex has hosted national tournaments and events, such as the Young Farmer of the Year.

=== Invercargill Licensing Trust ===
Several years ago, the Invercargill Licensing Trust, working with all Invercargill school principals, established a goal to pursue initiatives that would lead to Invercargill schools being recognised as leaders in education in New Zealand. A number have since been implemented, supported by Trust funding.

=== Portage and Waitākere Licensing Trusts ===
The Portage Licensing Trust and Waitākere Licensing Trust, operating jointly as the Trusts, have a near monopoly on liquor sales in West Auckland. In 2013, they were generating a combined $100 million a year in sales and employing 400 people. The Trusts Stadium is one of their most significant investments.

=== Ashburton Trust Event Centre ===
When the Ashburton community recognised the need for an all encompassing performing arts centre, the Licensing Trust supported the project, and over the years has contributed $1.6 million to feasibility studies, planning, development and establishment.

The events centre receives around 45,000 visitors annually through shows, conferences and award ceremonies, many from outside the district, thus enhancing economic growth as well as cultural diversity.

=== Rimutaka Licensing Trust ===
In 2002, this small Trust which operates a one Tavern outlet on the fringe of Upper Hutt City, took responsibility to build a sound shell stage in Harcourt Park. The $281,250 stage was then given to the city and the people of Upper Hutt. Rimutaka schools have also benefited from major donations over the past decade.

In the 10 years between 2001 and 2010, the Trust has supported its community with donations of $4.6 million.

=== Flaxmere Licensing Trust ===
Founded in 1975, the Flaxmere Licensing Trust was the last of the licensing trusts to be established; over the years it has supported its low income community with wide-ranging grants to education in the village of Flaxmere. During the last 20 years, the Trust has given $4.7 million to the Flaxmere community.

=== Mt Wellington Charitable Trust ===
Mt Wellington Charitable Trust was formed in 1964. The Trust focuses on assisting a wide variety of charitable, educational, cultural and sporting organisations located in the local areas of Mt Wellington, Panmure, Glen Innes, Ellerslie and Otahuhu. The average annual allocation of donations exceeds $1 million per annum.

The first major project the Trust embarked upon was the establishment of Swimarama, the local swimming pool complex in 1968.

More recent major projects involve provision of technical equipment to lower decile schools in the area; establishment at Bill McKinley Park of artificial turf for soccer and other community sporting activities, and assistance in developing the Auckland Netball Courts over the past five years which is now one of the largest sporting facilities in Auckland.
