= Albert-Eden-Puketāpapa ward =

- Ward of Auckland
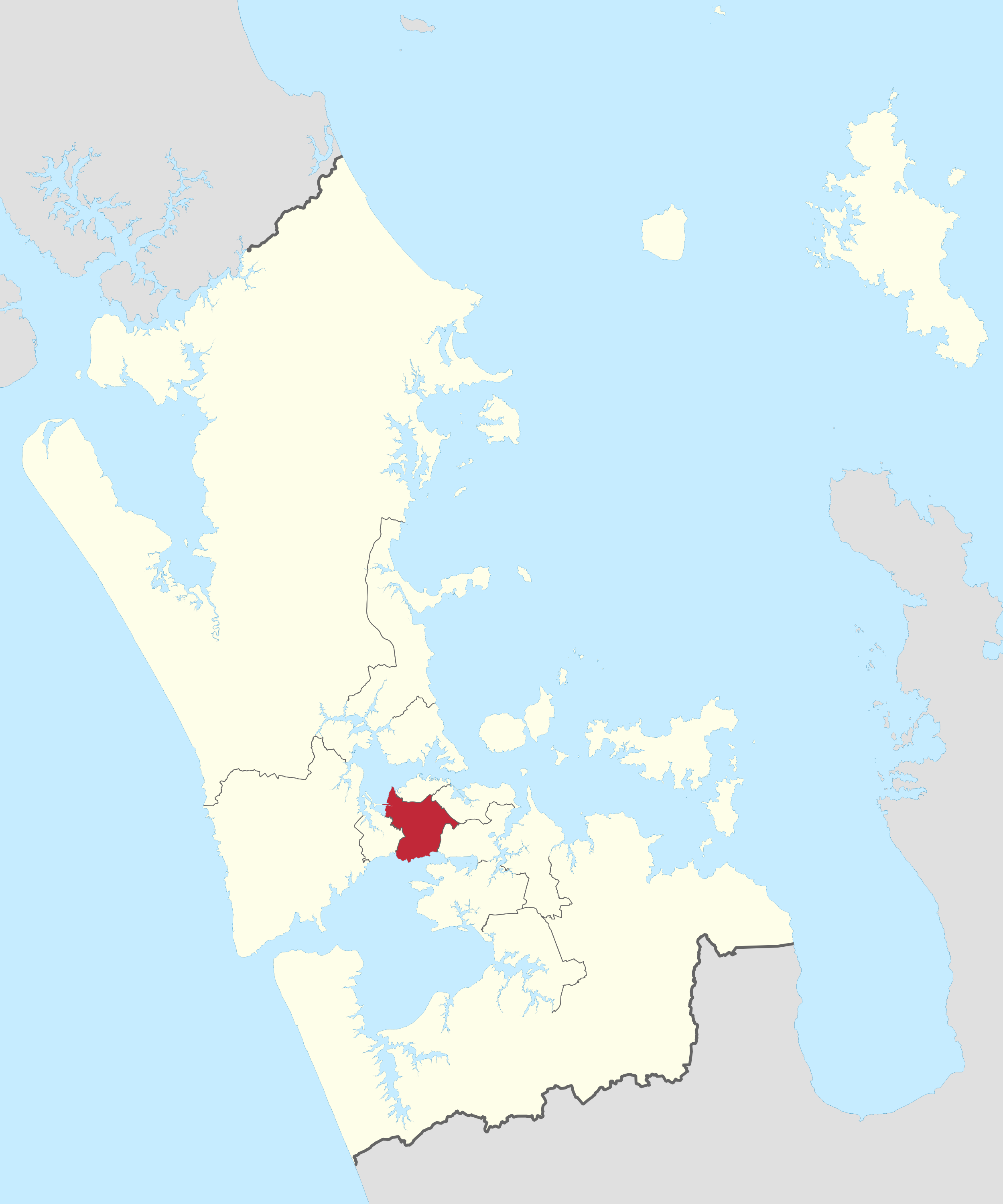
- Country: New Zealand
- Island: North Island
- Region: Auckland Region

Area
  - Land: 48.19 km^{2} (18.61 sq mi)

Population (June 2025)
  - Total: 170,300
  - Density: 3,534/km^{2} (9,153/sq mi)

The Albert-Eden-Puketāpapa ward is an Auckland Council ward which elects two councillors and covers the Albert-Eden and Puketāpapa Local Boards. Currently the councillors are Christine Fletcher and Julie Fairey. Prior to 2019, this ward was known as the Albert-Eden-Roskill Ward.

== Demographics ==
Albert-Eden-Puketāpapa ward covers 48.19 km^{2} (18.61 sq mi) and had an estimated population of 170,300 as of June 2025, with a population density of 3,534 people per km^{2}.

Historical population
Year	Pop.	±% p.a.
2006	141,780	—
2013	151,497	+0.95%
2018	160,581	+1.17%
2023	158,010	−0.32%
The 2006 population is for a smaller area of 47.06 km^{2}. Source:

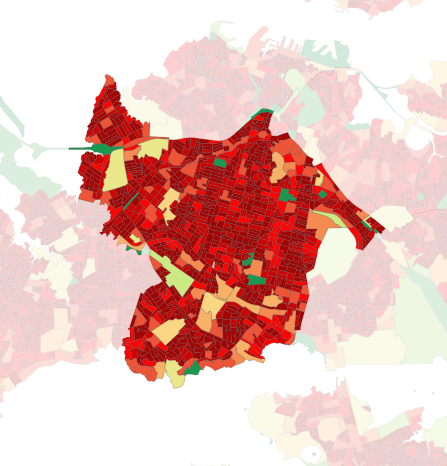
Population density in the 2023 census

Albert-Eden-Puketāpapa ward had a population of 158,010 in the 2023 New Zealand census, a decrease of 2,571 people (−1.6%) since the 2018 census, and an increase of 6,513 people (4.3%) since the 2013 census. There were 77,853 males, 79,230 females and 927 people of other genders in 53,376 dwellings. 5.3% of people identified as LGBTIQ+. The median age was 35.7 years (compared with 38.1 years nationally). There were 25,365 people (16.1%) aged under 15 years, 37,692 (23.9%) aged 15 to 29, 74,835 (47.4%) aged 30 to 64, and 20,118 (12.7%) aged 65 or older.

People could identify as more than one ethnicity. The results were 48.6% European (Pākehā); 7.9% Māori; 11.1% Pasifika; 39.4% Asian; 3.9% Middle Eastern, Latin American and African New Zealanders (MELAA); and 1.5% other, which includes people giving their ethnicity as "New Zealander". English was spoken by 92.2%, Māori language by 1.8%, Samoan by 2.6%, and other languages by 34.6%. No language could be spoken by 2.0% (e.g. too young to talk). New Zealand Sign Language was known by 0.4%. The percentage of people born overseas was 45.3, compared with 28.8% nationally.

Religious affiliations were 29.4% Christian, 8.3% Hindu, 4.7% Islam, 0.3% Māori religious beliefs, 2.3% Buddhist, 0.4% New Age, 0.2% Jewish, and 1.8% other religions. People who answered that they had no religion were 47.4%, and 5.4% of people did not answer the census question.

Of those at least 15 years old, 57,186 (43.1%) people had a bachelor's or higher degree, 47,160 (35.6%) had a post-high school certificate or diploma, and 28,299 (21.3%) people exclusively held high school qualifications. The median income was $47,300, compared with $41,500 nationally. 22,767 people (17.2%) earned over $100,000 compared to 12.1% nationally. The employment status of those at least 15 was that 72,195 (54.4%) people were employed full-time, 17,052 (12.9%) were part-time, and 4,089 (3.1%) were unemployed.

== Councillors ==
Albert-Eden-Puketāpapa Ward councillors of Auckland
- Incumbent; Christine Fletcher; Julie Fairey
- Term length: Three years
- Inaugural holder: Christine Fletcher; Cathy Casey
- Formation: 1 November 2010
- Website: www.aucklandcouncil.govt.nz

Election		Councillors elected	Affiliation	Votes	Notes
2010	1	Christine Fletcher	Citizens & Ratepayers	20,777	
2010	2	Cathy Casey	City Vision	15,087	
2013	1	Christine Fletcher	Communities and Residents	17,939	
2013	2	Cathy Casey	City Vision	16,545	
2016	1	Cathy Casey	City Vision	19,256	
2016	2	Christine Fletcher	Communities and Residents	16,925	
2019	1	Christine Fletcher	Communities and Residents	20239	
2019	2	Cathy Casey	City Vision	19255	
2022	1	Christine Fletcher	Communities and Residents	20021	
2022	2	Julie Fairey	City Vision	16966	

== Election results ==
Election results for the Albert-Eden-Puketāpapa Ward (Albert-Eden-Roskill Ward until 2019):

=== 2025 election results ===
Albert-Eden-Puketāpapa ward
Party	Candidate	Votes	%	±%
City Vision	Julie Fairey^{†}	15,962	46.41	+6.87
C&R	Christine Fletcher^{†}	15,425	44.84	−1.81
City Vision	Jon Turner	12,990	37.76	(new)
C&R	Mark Pervan	8,441	24.54	(new)
Independent	Paul Sun	5,060	14.71	(new)
Independent	Matt Zwartz	2,607	7.58	(new)
Independent	Samuel Clarke	2,047	5.95	(new)
Independent	Jacob Calvert	1,457	4.24	(new)
Informal votes		56	0.16	+0.08
Blank votes		838	2.44	−2.71
Turnout		34,397	28.52	−7.22
Registered electors		120,589		
City Vision hold				
C&R hold				
^{†} incumbent

=== 2022 election results ===
	Name	Affiliation	Votes
1	Christine Fletcher	Communities and Residents	20021
2	Julie Fairey	City Vision	16966
	Will McKenzie	Communities and Residents	16182
	Red Tsounga	City Vision	14013
	Stewart Brown	Independent	6211
	Frank Fu		3662
Blank			2212
Informal			36

=== 2016 election results ===
	Name	Affiliation	Votes	%
1	Cathy Casey	City Vision	19,256	23.6%
2	Christine Fletcher	Communities and Residents	16,925	20.7%
	Rob Harris	Auckland Future	10,000	12.2%
	Peter Haynes	City Vision	9,935	12.2%
	Benjamin Lee	Communities and Residents	9,070	11.1%
	Greg McKeown	Independent	8,472	10.4%
	Boris Sokratov	Independent	2,879	3.5%
	Bridgette Sullivan-Taylor	Independent	1,177	1.4%
Blank			3,867	4.7%
Informal			78	0.1%
Turnout			81,659	
