= City Vision =

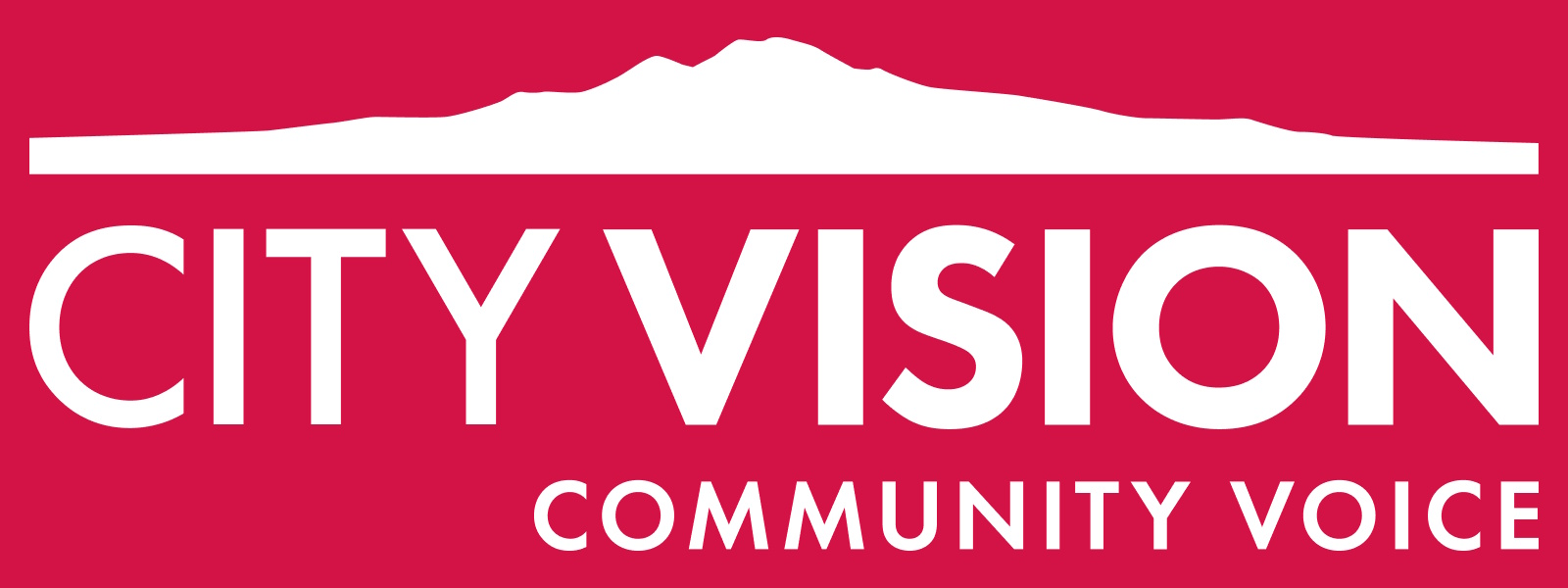
- Founded: 1998
- Political position: Centre-left
- Colours: Green; Red
- Auckland Council: 1 / 21
- Local Boards: 12 / 149
- Licensing trusts: 2 / 35

Website
- cityvision.org.nz

City Vision is a centre-left local-body political ticket in Auckland, New Zealand, that formed in 1998 as an alliance of Labour, Green, and independent progressive candidates. The group mainly runs candidates in the central Auckland wards and local board seats on the Auckland Council.

== Background ==
City Vision originated in 1998 as a centre-left electoral ticket representing the local Labour, Green parties, and other progressive candidates in the Auckland local council elections. It was formed to challenge the centre-right Citizens and Ratepayers Association (C&R), which had dominated control of the Auckland City Council since the C&R's formation in the 1930s. City Vision have traditionally held representation in the centre-west and south of Auckland City.

== Platform and positions ==
The group has campaigned for council to maintain ownership of strategic assets, including shares in Auckland Airport.

Environmental protection, housing, and public transportation have been key issues for the group.

== History ==
=== 2004 election ===
City Vision and Labour formed a working majority after the 2004 elections (winning nine seats) plus the election of Dick Hubbard to the mayoralty, partnering with Action Hobson anti-motorway councillors to form a bloc of twelve out of twenty.

=== 2004–2007 term ===
This term was also marked by infighting inside City Vision, with the deposition of leader Bruce Hucker and his replacement by Labour Councillor Richard Northey, a former Labour MP.

=== 2013–2016 term ===
In 2016, City Vision called for a total review of local voting, including evaluation of online voting feasibility and a single polling day.

=== 2022 election ===
During the 2022 Auckland local elections, City Vision candidate Julie Fairey was elected as a councillor for the Albert-Eden-Puketāpapa Ward. In addition, seven City Vision candidates were elected to local boards and three candidates to the Portage Licensing Trust.

=== 2022–2025 term ===
City Vision members of the Waitematā Local Board backed Genevieve Sage, a member of Communities & Residents, to be the board's chair; C&R had won a majority on the board (4 to City Vision's 3). There was only six members present (one of City Vision's members was absent), leading to the vote becoming deadlocked 3-3, with a coin toss deciding the vote in Sage's favour.

The council voted to leave Local Government New Zealand in March 2023; councillor Fairey voted against the withdrawal. Fairey pointed to the networking opportunities with other local government officials as beneficial. In a tweet, she called the decision "short-sighted".

Councillor Fairey opposed Mayor Brown's proposal to sell of Auckland Airport shares; an effort by the mayor to reduce the council's budget deficit. Council officers were investigating whether Fairey had a conflict of interest on the issue, as her husband (Michael Wood) had shares in the airport. Fairey said she was waiting on advice from the Office of the Auditor General, saying she would "follow accordingly regarding my participation in the coming Annual Budget vote."

Fairey made a code of conduct complaint against fellow councillor Ken Turner following a heated moment at a council meeting. After seven hours of debate on whether to get rid of speedway from Western Springs, Fairey motioned for it to be closed. Turner allegedly began yelling, banging on the table, and turning his mic on and off. Turner acknowledge his outburst, saying it wasn't directed at anyone in particular. Fairey told the Star-Times that the issue between her and Turner had been resolved and that she wouldn't comment further. The councillors switched chairs to sit further apart; council staff were satisfied that this would prevent "further incident". The complaint was not upheld, with staff saying that they had concluded there had not been a breach, taking into account the "challenging" nature of heated discussions. Turner said the situation ended differently; he said that he had "had enough" and told investigators to either sue him or go away.

=== 2025 election ===
The group announced candidates in March; these included incumbent councillor Julie Fairey and local board member Jon Turner running for the Albert-Eden-Puketāpapa Ward. Patrick Reynolds would be the group's candidate for Waitematā and Gulf Ward. The group's chair Bobby Shen said the group would focus on ensuring houses were built near public transport and that the city's waterways would be restored through protection of the environment.

== Summary of election results ==
Election	Candidates nominated				Seats won			
Election	Council candidates	Local board candidates	Health board candidates	Licensing trust candidates	Council seats	Local board seats	Health board seats	Licensing trust seats
2001 (Note: "Final Official Election Results". Archived from the original on 27 June 2002.)	11	24	5	3	4 / 19	12 / 52	3 / 7	2 / 9
2004 (Note: "Election results Final official election results 2004". aucklandcity.govt.nz. 2004. Archived from the original on 20 October 2008.)	9	22	5	3	6 / 19	17 / 47	3 / 7	2 / 9
2007 (Note: "Election results Final official election results 2007". aucklandcity.govt.nz. 2007. Archived from the original on 15 October 2008.)	9	21	4	3	3 / 19	9 / 52	3 / 7	1 / 9
2010	2	22	4	3	1 / 20	10 / 149	2 / 21	2 / 41
2013	2	19	7	3	1 / 20	14 / 149	2 / 21	1 / 35
2016	2	15	7	3	1 / 20	10 / 149	3 / 21	2 / 35
2019	3	18	6	3	2 / 20	10 / 149	3 / 21	3 / 35
2022	3	18	—N/a	3	1 / 20	7 / 149	—N/a	3 / 35
2025	3	21	—N/a	3	1 / 20	12 / 151	—N/a	2 / 35

== Lists of representatives ==
=== 2025–2028 term ===
City Vision elected members for the 2025–2028 term included:

Ward	Name	Photo
Albert-Eden-Puketāpapa	Julie Fairey	
Local board	Subdivision	Name
Albert-Eden (in majority)	Maungawhau	Michelle Thorp
Albert-Eden (in majority)	Ōwairaka	Margi Wilson
Albert-Eden (in majority)	Ōwairaka	Emma McInnes
Albert-Eden (in majority)	Ōwairaka	Christina Robertson
Albert-Eden (in majority)	Ōwairaka	Jacqui Tay
Puketāpapa (in minority)	—N/a	Jon Turner
Puketāpapa (in minority)	—N/a	Rowan Cant
Waitematā (in majority)	—N/a	Alexandra Bonham
Waitematā (in majority)	—N/a	Caitlin Wilson
Waitematā (in majority)	—N/a	Anahera Rawiri
Waitematā (in majority)	—N/a	Peter Elliott
Waitematā (in majority)	—N/a	Kara Kennedy
Licensing trust	Ward	Name
Portage (in minority)	Auckland City	Margi Watson
Portage (in minority)	Auckland City	Mark Graham

=== 2022–2025 term ===
City Vision elected members for the 2022–2025 term included:

Ward	Name	Photo
Albert-Eden-Puketāpapa	Julie Fairey	
Local board	Subdivision	Name
Albert-Eden (split control)	Owairaka	Margi Wilson
Albert-Eden (split control)	Owairaka	Julia Maskill
Albert-Eden (split control)	Owairaka	Christinia Robertson
Albert-Eden (split control)	Owairaka	Liv Roe
Puketāpapa (in minority)	—N/a	Bobby Shen
Puketāpapa (in minority)	—N/a	Jon Turner
Waitematā (in minority)	—N/a	Alexandra Bonham
Waitematā (in minority)	—N/a	Anahera Rawiri
Waitematā (in minority)	—N/a	Richard Northey
Licensing trust	Ward	Name
Portage (in minority)	Auckland City	Marcus Amosa
Portage (in minority)	Auckland City	Margi Watson
Portage (in minority)	Auckland City	Mark Beavis

=== 2019–2022 term ===
City Vision elected members for the 2019–2022 term included:

Ward	Name	Photo
Albert-Eden-Puketāpapa	Cathy Casey	
Waitematā and Gulf	Pippa Coom	
Local board	Subdivision	Name
Albert-Eden (split control)	Owairaka	Margi Wilson
Albert-Eden (split control)	Owairaka	Julia Maskill
Albert-Eden (split control)	Owairaka	Christinia Robertson
Albert-Eden (split control)	Owairaka	Graeme Easte
Puketāpapa (in majority)	—N/a	Julie Fairey
Puketāpapa (in majority)	—N/a	Jon Turner
Puketāpapa (in majority)	—N/a	Bobby Shen
Puketāpapa (in majority)	—N/a	Harry Doig
Waitematā (in majority)	—N/a	Alexandra Bonham
Waitematā (in majority)	—N/a	Adriana Christie
Waitematā (in majority)	—N/a	Richard Northey
Waitematā (in majority)	—N/a	Julie Sandilands
Waitematā (in majority)	—N/a	Kerrin Leoni
Waitematā (in majority)	—N/a	Graeme Gunthorp
Licensing trust	Ward	Name
Portage (in minority)	Auckland City	Catherine Farmer
Portage (in minority)	Auckland City	Margi Watson
Portage (in minority)	Auckland City	Kurt Taogaga
District health board		Name
Auckland (in minority)		Jo Agnew
Auckland (in minority)		Peter Davis
Auckland (in minority)		Michelle Atkinson

=== 2016–2019 term ===
City Vision elected members for the 2016–2019 term included:

Ward	Name	Photo
Albert-Eden-Puketāpapa	Cathy Casey	
Local board	Subdivision	Name
Albert-Eden (in majority)	Owairaka	Margi Wilson
Albert-Eden (in majority)	Owairaka	Jessica Rose
Albert-Eden (in majority)	Owairaka	Glenda Fryer
Albert-Eden (in majority)	Owairaka	Graeme Easte
Albert-Eden (in majority)	Maungawhau	Peter Haynes
Puketāpapa (in majority)	—N/a	Julie Fairey
Puketāpapa (in majority)	—N/a	Anne-Marie Coury
Puketāpapa (in majority)	—N/a	David Holm
Puketāpapa (in majority)	—N/a	Harry Doig
Puketāpapa (in majority)	—N/a	Shail Kaushal
Waitematā (in majority)	—N/a	Pippa Coom
Waitematā (in majority)	—N/a	Shale Chambers
Waitematā (in majority)	—N/a	Adriana Christie
Waitematā (in majority)	—N/a	Richard Northey
Waitematā (in majority)	—N/a	Vernon Tava
Licensing trust	Ward	Name
Portage (in minority)	Auckland City	Catherine Farmer
Portage (in minority)	Auckland City	Margi Watson
District health board		Name
Auckland (in minority)		Jo Agnew
Auckland (in minority)		Michelle Atkinson
Auckland (in minority)		Robyn Northey

=== 2013–2016 term ===
City Vision elected members for the 2013–2016 term included:

Ward	Name	Photo
Albert-Eden-Puketāpapa	Cathy Casey	
Local board	Subdivision	Name
Albert-Eden (in majority)	Owairaka	Margi Wilson
Albert-Eden (in majority)	Owairaka	Glenda Fryer
Albert-Eden (in majority)	Owairaka	Graeme Easte
Albert-Eden (in majority)	Owairaka	Helga Arlington
Albert-Eden (in majority)	Maungawhau	Peter Haynes
Puketāpapa (in majority)	—N/a	Michael Wood
Puketāpapa (in majority)	—N/a	Julie Fairey
Puketāpapa (in majority)	—N/a	David Holm
Puketāpapa (in majority)	—N/a	Harry Doig
Waitematā (in majority)	—N/a	Pippa Coom
Waitematā (in majority)	—N/a	Shale Chambers
Waitematā (in majority)	—N/a	Christopher Dempsey
Waitematā (in majority)	—N/a	Deborah Yates
Waitematā (in majority)	—N/a	Vernon Tava
Licensing trust	Ward	Name
Portage (in minority)	Auckland City	Catherine Farmer
District health board		Name
Auckland (in minority)		Jo Agnew
Auckland (in minority)		Robyn Northey

=== 2010–2013 term ===
City Vision elected members for the 2010–2013 term included:

Ward	Name	Photo
Albert-Eden-Puketāpapa	Cathy Casey	
Local board	Subdivision	Name
Albert-Eden (in majority)	Owairaka	Margi Wilson
Albert-Eden (in majority)	Owairaka	Graeme Easte
Albert-Eden (in majority)	Owairaka	Helga Arlington
Albert-Eden (in majority)	Maungawhau	Peter Haynes
Albert-Eden (in majority)	Maungawhau	Simon Mitchell
Puketāpapa (in minority)	—N/a	Michael Wood
Puketāpapa (in minority)	—N/a	Julie Fairey
Waitematā (in majority)	—N/a	Pippa Coom
Waitematā (in majority)	—N/a	Shale Chambers
Waitematā (in majority)	—N/a	Christopher Dempsey
Waitematā (in majority)	—N/a	Tricia Reade
Waitematā (in majority)	—N/a	Jesse Chalmers
Licensing trust	Ward	Name
Portage (in minority)	Auckland City	Catherine Farmer
Portage (in minority)	Auckland City	Lorraine Wilson
District health board		Name
Auckland (in minority)		Jo Agnew
Auckland (in minority)		Robyn Northey
