= Cathy Casey =

New Zealand politician

Cathy Casey is a New Zealand politician who was an Auckland Councillor, for the Albert-Eden-Roskill Ward, prior to her 2022 retirement.

She has a particular interest in social issues, such as taking a strong stance against bylaws restricting or criminalising begging, considering it an example of a social issue that should not be left to the police to try and manage. She was also supported by various unions for her stance on subjects such as opposition against "casualisation" of Ports of Auckland's wharf workforce, and her support for the living wage campaign.

== Early years ==
Born 1957, Casey moved to New Zealand from Scotland in 1987.

She taught at Kuranui College and served on the board of trustees. Between 2001 and 2004 she worked at AUT University.

Casey was formerly the partner of Matt McCarten. She has since been living in a relationship with her Dutch partner Kees and their blended family of three teenagers.

== Political career ==
Auckland Council
Years	Ward	Affiliation
2010–2013	Albert-Eden-Roskill	City Vision
2013–2016	Albert-Eden-Roskill	City Vision
2016–2019	Albert-Eden-Roskill	City Vision
2019–2022	Albert-Eden-Puketāpapa	City Vision

Casey served on the South Wairarapa District Council between 1990 and 2001.

In the 1999 election Casey stood for the Alliance party in the Wairarapa electorate. She placed third.

Casey was elected to the Auckland City Council in 2004. In the 2010 Auckland Council elections she was elected from the Albert-Eden-Roskill ward. She was re-elected in 2013, 2016 and 2019. Casey retired as a councillor in 2022.
