= Christine Fletcher =

New Zealand politician

The Honourable Councillor Christine Fletcher QSO
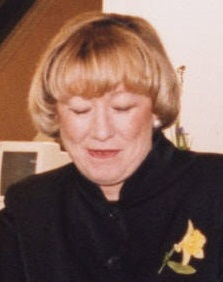
- Fletcher in 1999

Albert-Eden-Puketāpapa ward Councillor Albert-Eden-Roskill (2010–2019)
- Incumbent
- Assumed office 31 October 2010 Serving with Julie Fairey
- Preceded by: Position created

37th Mayor of Auckland City
- In office 1998–2001
- Preceded by: Les Mills
- Succeeded by: John Banks

Member of the New Zealand Parliament for Epsom
- In office 12 October 1996 – 27 November 1999
- Preceded by: New constituency
- Succeeded by: Richard Worth

Member of the New Zealand Parliament for Eden
- In office 27 October 1990 – 12 October 1996
- Preceded by: Richard Northey
- Succeeded by: Constituency abolished

Personal details
- Born: Christine Elizabeth Lees; 2 December 1955 (age 70) New Zealand
- Party: National

Christine Elizabeth Fletcher QSO (née Lees, born 25 January 1955) is a New Zealand politician. Currently an Auckland Council councillor, she was previously a National Party Member of Parliament from 1990 to 1999, and served one term as Mayor of Auckland City between 1998 and 2001. In October 2010 she became the co-leader of the Auckland local body ticket Citizens & Ratepayers after winning the Albert-Eden-Roskill ward on the new Auckland Council.

== Early life and family ==
Fletcher was born in 1955, the daughter of Shirley and Ted Lees, the founder of heavy machinery and marine engine company Lees Industries. Educated at St Cuthbert's College, Auckland, she was married to Angus Fletcher, and was thus the sister-in-law of former Fletcher Challenge CEO Hugh Fletcher and his wife Chief Justice Sian Elias.

== Political career ==
=== Member of Parliament ===
New Zealand Parliament
Years	Term	Electorate	List	Party
1990–1993	43rd	Eden		National
1993–1996	44th	Eden		National
1996–1999	45th	Epsom	22	National

At the 1990 general election, Fletcher was the National Party candidate for the Eden electorate, and defeated the Labour incumbent, Richard Northey. She then held the seat at the 1993 election. After Labour MP Peter Dunne became an independent MP in October 1994 Fletcher approached him to join the National Party. Dunne declined the offer however.

She won the new Epsom electorate in the 1996 election, and was subsequently appointed to the ministerial roles of Local Government, Women's Affairs and Cultural Affairs. However, she resigned as a minister on 11 September 1997, because she objected to the sale of the assets of the Auckland Regional Services Trust proposed by National.

=== Mayor of Auckland City ===
Fletcher retired as an MP in 1999, having been elected Mayor of Auckland City at the 1998 local-body elections. She was the second woman to hold the office, after Cath Tizard. Fletcher's mayoralty was characterised by the decision to progress with the Britomart Transport Centre in downtown Auckland. In 2001 she was defeated by John Banks, another former National MP. She continued her opposition to Banks in the following years, particularly opposing the Eastern Transport Corridor, which Banks had proposed as a major motorway, and which she noted she had been opposing for more than a decade by then.

In 1993 Fletcher was awarded a New Zealand Suffrage Centennial Medal. In the 2002 New Year Honours, Fletcher was appointed a Companion of the Queen's Service Order for public services.

She ran again for the mayoralty in October 2004, but finished third behind Dick Hubbard and Banks.

=== Life after mayoralty and return to politics ===
Auckland Council
Years	Ward	Affiliation
2010–2013	Albert-Eden-Roskill	Citizens and Ratepayers
2013–2016	Albert-Eden-Roskill	Communities and Residents
2016–2019	Albert-Eden-Roskill	Communities and Residents
2019–present	Albert-Eden-Puketāpapa	Communities and Residents

After her mayoral term, Fletcher became involved in various community organisations, including the Motutapu Trust, a conservation body involved in protecting Motutapu Island in the Hauraki Gulf.

She was a contributor in 2004 to a book by the Better Democracy group, promoting citizen participation in the New Zealand democratic process.

In 2010 she announced her candidacy for the Albert-Eden-Roskill ward on the new Auckland council, where she eventually succeeded in polling highest for one of the two available councillor seats in her ward. She considered that working for a CBD rail tunnel was one of her main priorities, extending the capacity of Britomart, whose construction she had successfully fought for in her mayoral term.

Fletcher was re-elected in 2013, 2016, 2019 and 2022. She again ran and retained her seat as a councillor in the 2025 elections.

New Zealand Parliament
Preceded by Richard Northey	Member of Parliament for Eden; 1990–1996	Constituency abolished
New constituency	Member of Parliament for Epsom; 1996–1999	Succeeded by Richard Worth
Political offices
Preceded by Les Mills	Mayor of Auckland City; 1998–2001	Succeeded by John Banks
