= 2028 New Zealand local elections =

- 14 October 2028

The 2028 New Zealand local elections (Māori: Nga Pōtitanga ā-Rohe 2028) are future triennial elections planned to be held from September until 14 October 2028 (Note: The Local Electoral Act 2001 stipulates in section 10, subsection (2) that: "A general election of members of every local authority, local board, or community board must be held on the second Saturday in October in every third year after the general election referred to in subsection (1).") to elect local mayors, councillors, and members of various other local government bodies. Regional councils will have been abolished under the current Sixth National Government's plans for local government reform, though this may change.

== Background ==
=== Proposed amalgamations ===
Tasman District Council mayor Tim King was critical of the government's process, preferring central government direction for potential amalgamations rather than expecting communities to come up with merger proposals themselves.

=== Voting systems ===
Most local and regional councils in New Zealand use postal voting for local elections. In late September 2026, the Auckland Council voted to reinstate in-person voting during the 2028 local elections in an effort to boost voter turnout at local elections.

In late October 2026, the Dunedin City Council voted by a margin of 8 to 5 votes to hold a referendum on whether to retain the Single Transferrable Vote (STV) system or to revert to the First Past the Post system, which is used by the majority of local and regional councils in New Zealand.

== See also ==
- Local elections in New Zealand
