= 2019 Auckland Council election =

The 2019 Auckland Council election took place between September and October 2019 by postal vote as part of nation-wide local elections. The elections were the fourth since the merger of seven councils into the Auckland Council, which is composed of the mayor and 20 councillors, and 149 members of 21 local boards. Twenty-one district health board members and 41 licensing trust members were also elected.

== Mayoral election ==
The incumbent mayor, Phil Goff, sought a second term and was re-elected ahead of second highest polling candidate John Tamihere.

== Governing body elections ==
Twenty members were elected to the Auckland Council, across thirteen wards, using the first past the post vote system.

The Auckland Future ticket, holding four local body seats since 2016, announced in March 2019 that it would not field candidates.

Mike Lee, sitting councillor for Waitemata and Gulf ward, announced in late-June 2019 that he would run again. The City Vision ticket, which had endorsed Lee since 1998, had selected Pippa Coom as its candidate in March 2019.

The final candidate list was released on 19 August.

=== Rodney ward (1) ===
Incumbent Greg Sayers was the only nomination.

Affiliation (if any)	Name	Votes	Notes
Independent for Rodney	Greg Sayers	-	Elected unopposed
	Informal/blank	-	

=== Albany ward (2) ===
Incumbents Walker and Watson both ran for re-election under the ticket "Putting People First".

Affiliation (if any)	Name	Votes	Notes
Putting People First	John Watson	28,510	
Putting People First	Wayne Walker	24,768	
Independent	Julia Parfitt	20,278	
	Alezix Heneti	3,230	
	Informal/blank	3,092	

=== North Shore ward (2) ===
Incumbents Darby and Hills both sought re-election.

Affiliation (if any)	Name	Votes	Notes
A Positive Voice for the Shore	Richard Hills	18,746	
Taking the Shore Forward	Chris Darby	17,559	
More For The Shore	Danielle Grant	15,071	
More For The Shore	Grant Gillon	14,300	
Independent	Anthony Bunting	3,976	
	Informal/blank	1,500	

=== Waitākere Ward (2) ===
Of the two incumbents, Linda Cooper sought re-election and Penny Hulse retired.

Affiliation (if any)	Name	Votes	Notes
Independent	Linda Cooper	14,750	
Labour	Shane Henderson	14,695	
Labour	Greg Presland	11,623	
Independent	Peter Chan	10,674	
Independent	Paul Talyancich	6,121	
Independent	Dillon Tooth	5,944	
STOP Trashing Our Planet	Tricia Cheel	2,677	
Independent	Michael Coote	2,558	
	Informal/blank	1,837	

=== Waitemata and Gulf ward (1) ===
Incumbent Mike Lee sought re-election.

Affiliation (if any)	Name	Votes	Notes
City Vision	Pippa Coom	6,581	
Independent	Mike Lee	6,262	
C&R - Communities and Residents	Sarah Trotman	2,907	
Independent	Will Maxwell-Steele	740	
Independent	Allan Matson	431	
	Informal/blank	1,147	

=== Whau ward (1) ===
Incumbent Ross Clow sought re-election.

Affiliation (if any)	Name	Votes	Notes
C&R - Communities and Residents	Tracy Mulholland	5,853	
Labour	Ross Clow	5,663	
Green	Jessamine Fraser	2,241	
Community Independents	Paul Davie	1,774	
Independent	Anne Degia-Pala	1,336	
	Informal/blank	-	

=== Albert-Eden-Roskill ward (2) ===
Incumbents Casey and Fletcher both sought re-election.

Affiliation (if any)	Name	Votes	Notes
C&R - Communities and Residents	Christine Fletcher	20,239	
City Vision	Cathy Casey	19,255	
C&R - Communities and Residents	Mark Thomas	17,570	
City Vision	Mark Graham	15,965	
	Informal/blank	2,512	

=== Maungakiekie-Tamaki ward (1) ===
Incumbent Josephine Bartley sought re-election.

Affiliation (if any)	Name	Votes	Notes
Labour	Josephine Bartley	8,358	
C&R - Communities and Residents	Josh Beddell	7,214	
Better Auckland	Carmel Claridge	1,264	
United Locals	Patrick O'Meara	892	
	Informal/blank	943	

=== Manukau ward (2) ===
Incumbents Collins and Filipaina both sought re-election.

Affiliation (if any)	Name	Votes	Notes
Labour	Faanana Efeso Collins	19,053	
Labour	Alf Filipaina	18,814	
Communist League	Patrick Brown	4,912	
	Informal/blank	1,722	

=== Manurewa-Papakura ward (2) ===
Of the two incumbents, Daniel Newman sought re-election and John Walker retired.

Affiliation (if any)	Name	Votes	Notes
Manurewa-Papakura Action Team	Angela Dalton	17,362	
Manurewa-Papakura Action Team	Daniel Newman	15,904	
Labour	Peter Neilson	6,191	
Labour	Ilango Krishnamoorthy	4,347	
Justice for Families	Veronica Turner	2,605	
Independent	Karin Kerr	2,575	
	Informal/blank	1,356	

=== Franklin ward (1) ===
Incumbent Bill Cashmore was the only nomination.

Affiliation (if any)	Name	Votes	Notes
Team Franklin	Bill Cashmore	-	Elected unopposed
	Informal/blank	-	

=== Ōrākei ward (1) ===
Incumbent Desley Simpson sought re-election.

Affiliation (if any)	Name	Votes	Notes
C&R - Communities and Residents	Desley Simpson	19,618	
Green	Alan Barraclough	3,892	
Better Auckland	Mike Padfield	2,958	
	Informal/blank	1,532	

=== Howick ward (2) ===
Incumbents Stewart and Young both sought re-election.

Affiliation (if any)	Name	Votes	Notes
Independent	Sharon Stewart	19,531	
Independent	Paul Young	16,809	
Independent	Damian Light	12,369	
Collings for Council	David Collings	11,820	
East Vision	Tofik Mamedov	4,363	
	Informal/blank	1,722	

== Licensing Trust elections ==
35 Members were elected to 5 licensing trusts across Auckland.

=== Birkenhead Licensing Trust (6) ===
Affiliation (if any)	Name	Votes
Your Community Trust	Paula Gillon	Elected unopposed
Your Community Trust	Marilyn Nicholls	Elected unopposed
Your Community Trust	Shane Prince	Elected unopposed
Your Community Trust	Marcus Reynolds	Elected unopposed
Your Community Trust	Stuart Weir	Elected unopposed
	Informal/blank	-

=== Mt Wellington Licensing Trust (6) ===
Affiliation (if any)	Name	Votes
Labour	Mark Gosche	3,232
Labour	Nerissa Henry	3,067
Labour	Alan Verrall	2,759
C&R - Communities and Residents	Tania Batucan	2,730
Labour	Maureen Benson-Rea	2,672
Labour	Jean Dolheguy	2,494
United Locals	Leanne Cross	2,478
Labour	Deborah Misiupa	2,394
Communities & Residents	Hainoame Fulivai	2,311
United Locals	Greg Woodcock	1,811
United Locals	Patrick O'Meara	1,802
United Locals	Bryan Mockbridge	1,575
	Informal/blank	1,309

=== Portage Licensing Trust ===
==== Ward No 1 – Auckland City (3) ====
Affiliation (if any)	Name	Votes
City Vision	Catherine Farmer	5,074
City Vision	Margi Watson	4,734
City Vision	Kurt Taogaga	3,646
Community First	Kathryn Davie	3,631
Community First	Paul Davie	3,366
Trusts Action Group	Sam Learmonth	3,080
Communities & Residents	Shefali Mehta	2,946
	Informal/blank	-

==== Ward No 2 – New Lynn (2) ====
Affiliation (if any)	Name	Votes
Labour	Leanne Taylor	2,027
Labour	Pam Nutall	1,874
Independent	Wayne Davis	1,623
	Informal/blank	-

==== Ward No 3 – Glen Eden (2) ====
Affiliation (if any)	Name	Votes
Future West	Neil Henderson	1,807
Independent	Janet Clews	1,601
Trusts Action Group	Noel Watson	1,490
	Informal/blank	-

==== Ward No 4 – Titirangi / Green Bay (2) ====
Affiliation (if any)	Name	Votes
Future West	Mark Roberts	4,264
Trusts Action Group	Ben Goodale	3,427
Labour	Ross Clow	3,344
Independent	Andreas Bodenstein	1,154
	Informal/blank	-

==== Ward No 5 – Kelston West (1) ====
Affiliation (if any)	Name	Votes
Labour	Ami Chand	Elected unopposed

=== Waitakere Licensing Trust ===
==== Ward No 1 – Te Atatū (2) ====
Affiliation (if any)	Name	Votes
Independent	Penny Hulse	4,445
Labour	Brooke Loader	3,392
Trusts Action Group	Amanda Roberts	2,956
Trusts Action Group	Nick Smale	2,835
	Informal/blank	-

==== Ward No 2 –Lincoln (3) ====
Affiliation (if any)	Name	Votes
-	-	-
-	-	-
-	-	-
	Informal/blank	-

==== Ward No 3 – Waitakere (1) ====
Affiliation (if any)	Name	Votes
-	-	-
-	-	-
-	-	-
	Informal/blank	-

==== Ward No 4 – Henderson (1) ====
Affiliation (if any)	Name	Votes
-	-	-
-	-	-
-	-	-
	Informal/blank	-

=== Wiri Licensing Trust (6) ===
Affiliation (if any)	Name	Votes
-	-	-
-	-	-
-	-	-
	Informal/blank	-

== Term-end performance assessment ==
Bernard Orsman and Simon Wilson, the local government reporters from The New Zealand Herald, both assessed the performance of each elected member at the end of the term. Their ratings, from 1 to 10 (worst to best), were compiled without them comparing notes. Orsman and Wilson are at opposing ends of the political spectrum. Seven out of their twenty-one ratings are identical. Orsman assigned rates from 3 to 8, while Wilson had councillors rated from 1 to 10.
