= 2013 Auckland local board elections =

Election in New Zealand

149 members were elected to local boards in the 2013 Auckland local board elections, an election held as part of the 2013 New Zealand local elections.

== Local board elections ==
This table shows a summary of the results (excluding Whau):

| Party | Local Board members | Boards Controlled |
| Local Parties | 62 | 7 |
| Independent | 39 | 0 |
| Labour | 16 | 2 |
| C&R | 12 | 1 |
| City Vision | 10 | 1 |
| Conservative Party of New Zealand | 2 | 0 |
| Green | 1 | 0 |

=== Rodney Local Board ===
==== Wellsford Subdivision (1) ====
| Affiliation (if any) | Name | Votes |
|---|---|---|
| Independent | James George Colville | 534 |
| Independent | Thomas De Thierry | 349 |
| Independent | Tony Sowden | 262 |
| Conservatives | Thomas O'Rourke | 217 |

==== Warkworth Subdivision (3) ====
| Affiliation (if any) | Name | Votes |
|---|---|---|
| Independent | Steven Robert Garner | 2,723 |
| Independent | Beth Houlbrooke | 2,323 |
| Independent | Greg Sayers | 1,837 |
| Conservatives | Nathaniel Heslop | 1,668 |
| Action With Results | June Turner | 1,543 |
| Independent | Anne Martin | 1,461 |
| Independent | Bruce Manson | 1,449 |
| Independent | Bruce Scoggins | 1,112 |
| Independent | Geoffrey Bowes | 931 |
| Conservatives | Regan Monahan | 656 |

==== Kumeu Subdivision (4) ====
| Affiliation (if any) | Name | Votes |
|---|---|---|
| Independent | Brenda Steele | 3,045 |
| Independent | Thomas Grace | 2,587 |
| Independent | Phelan Michael Pirrie | 2,557 |
| Independent | Warren William Flaunty | 2,512 |
| Independent | Bob Howard | 2,367 |
| Independent | Morgan Hancock | 1,967 |
| Independent | Paula Daye | 1,913 |
| Conservatives | Oliver Vitali | 1,660 |
| Independent | Vivien Dostine | 733 |

==== Dairy Flat Subdivision (1) ====
| Affiliation (if any) | Name | Votes |
|---|---|---|
| Independent | John Mclean | 683 |
| Independent | Peter Brydon | 457 |
| Conservatives | Ross Craig | 392 |

=== Hibiscus and Bays Local Board ===
==== Hibiscus Coast Subdivision (4) ====
| Affiliation (if any) | Name | Votes |
|---|---|---|
| People and Penlink First | Greg Sayers | 8,070 |
| People and Penlink First | John Watson | 7,995 |
| Loving the Coast | Gaye Anne Harding | 5,536 |
| Independent | Janet Fitzgerald | 4,399 |
| People and Penlink First | Lovisa Chloe Kronqvist | 3,760 |
| People and Penlink First | Saunil Hagler | 3,576 |
| Conservatives | Simonne Dyer | 3,422 |
| Loving the Coast | Talia Johnston | 3,099 |
| Conservatives | Danny Mountain | 2,834 |
| Independent | Mary-Anne Benson-Cooper | 2,036 |

==== East Coast Bays Subdivision (4) ====
| Affiliation (if any) | Name | Votes |
|---|---|---|
| Independent | Julia Parfitt | 5,490 |
| Independent | Lisa Whyte | 4,672 |
| Independent | Gary Holmes | 3,879 |
| Bays Independent | David Cooper | 3,638 |
| Independent | Teresa Moore | 3,527 |
| | Chris Bettany | 3,008 |
| Independent | Bob Jones | 2,945 |
| Independent | Ivan Dunn | 2,557 |
| Conservatives | Stephen Kendall-Jones | 2,361 |
| Conservatives | Rob Caithness | 2,309 |
| Independent | Edward Grady Benson-Cooper | 1,695 |
| Communities & Residents | Toby Hutton | 1,562 |
| Independent | Kevin Moorhead | 1,418 |
| Independent | Lynne Cooper | 1,145 |

=== Upper Harbour Local Board (6) ===
| Affiliation (if any) | Name | Votes |
|---|---|---|
| Conservatives | Christine Rankin | 7,109 |
| Independent | Lisa Whyte | 7,109 |
| Independent | Brian Neeson | 6,450 |
| | Margaret Miles | 6,344 |
| Conservatives | Callum Blair | 5,450 |
| Independent | John Maclean | 5,129 |
| | Nicholas Mayne | 4,418 |
| Team of Independents | Uzra Casuri Balouch | 3,530 |
| | Jonathan Mcdonald | 2,013 |

=== Devonport-Takapuna Local Board (6) ===
| Affiliation (if any) | Name | Votes |
|---|---|---|
| Shore Future | Chris Darby | 9,443 |
| Shore Future | Allison Roe | 7,320 |
| Team of Independents | Grant Gillon | 7,185 |
| Community Before Council | Mike Cohen | 7,072 |
| Team of Independents | Jan O'Connor | 6,774 |
| Shore Future | Dianne Hale | 6,628 |
| Fair Deal For Shore | Joseph Bergin | 6,377 |
| Shore Future | Aidan Bennett | 4,650 |
| Shore Future | Dave Donaldson | 4,278 |
| Independent | Micheal Sheehy | 4,165 |
| Shore Future | Tracy Gwen Talbot | 4,157 |
| Shore Community – Shore Seniors | Bill Rayner | 3,322 |
| NoMoreRates | David Thornton | 3,117 |
| Independent | Anthony Wareham | 2,519 |
| Independent | Mary-Anne Benson-Cooper | 2,490 |
| Conservatives | Deborah Dougherty | 1,843 |
| Conservatives | Craig Hans Jensen | 1,743 |
| Independent | Kevin Brett | 913 |

=== Henderson-Massey Local Board (8) ===
| Affiliation (if any) | Name | Votes |
|---|---|---|
| Independent | Vanessa Neeson | 8,223 |
| Independent | Peter Chan | 6,895 |
| Independent | Warren Flaunty | 6,889 |
| Labour | Shane Henderson | 6,527 |
| Independent | Brenda Brady | 6,435 |
| Independent | Luke Wilson | 6,068 |
| Labour | Will Flavell | 5,970 |
| Independent | Tracy Kirkley | 5,929 |

=== Waitākere Ranges Local Board (6) ===
| Affiliation (if any) | Name | Votes |
|---|---|---|
| Future West | Sandra Coney | 5,879 |
| Future West | Neil Henderson | 4,886 |
| Future West | Denise Yates | 4,747 |
| Future West | Greg Presland | 4,507 |
| Future West-Green | Saffron Toms | 4,062 |
| Future West | Steve Tollestrup | 3,938 |
| Progressive Independents | Janet Clews | 3,786 |
| Team Local-Independent | Judy Lawley | 3,733 |
| Westwards | Ken Turner | 3,566 |
| WestWards | Mark Brickell | 3,452 |
| Independent | Mark Bellingham | 3,227 |
| WestWards | Johnny Knox | 2,830 |
| WestWards | Linda Potauaine | 2,773 |
| Team Local-Independent | Jenifer Conlon | 2,722 |
| | Jason Woolston | 2,064 |
| Independent | Gayle Marshall | 1,964 |
| Independent | Lawrence Watt | 1,809 |
| Progressive Independents | Evan Taylor | 1,584 |

=== Albert-Eden Local Board ===
==== Maungawhau Subdivision (4) ====
| Affiliation (if any) | Name | Votes |
|---|---|---|
| Communities and Residents | Rachel Langton | 5,638 |
| Communities and Residents | Lee Corrick | 5,145 |
| Communities and Residents | Tim Woolfield | 5,127 |
| City Vision | Peter Haynes | 4,655 |
| Communities and Residents | Bevan Chuang | 4,409 |
| City Vision | Lisa Loveday | 3,743 |
| City Vision | Rohan Evans | 3,670 |
| City Vision | Godfrey Rudolph | 3,662 |
| | Greg McKeown | 3,639 |

==== Owairaka Subdivision (4) ====
| Affiliation (if any) | Name | Votes |
|---|---|---|
| City Vision | Margi Watson | 4,847 |
| City Vision | Glenda Fryer | 4,268 |
| City Vision | Graeme Easte | 3,928 |
| City Vision | Helga Arlington | 3,815 |
| Focus Local – Independent | Pauline Anderson | 3,548 |
| Liveable Communities | Phil Chase | 3,188 |
| Communities and Residents | Monique Poirier | 2,474 |
| Communities and Residents | Rodger Jack | 2,360 |
| Liveable Communities | Lisa Er | 1,987 |
| Liveable Communities | Philip Nannestad | 1,929 |
| Conservatives | Jeffrey Johnson | 1,823 |
| Focus Local – Independent | Mark Donnelly | 1,762 |
| Focus Local – Independent | Gayatri Jaduram | 1,572 |
| Liveable Communities | Sheelah Chalklen | 1,290 |
| Mana | Sian Robertson | 888 |

=== Great Barrier Local Board (5) ===
| Affiliation (if any) | Name | Votes |
|---|---|---|
| Independent | Izzy Fordham | 378 |
| Independent | Susan Daly | 347 |
| | Judy Gilbert | 307 |
| Independent | Jeff Cleave | 272 |
| Independent | Nikki Watts | 220 |
| | Christina Spence | 220 |
| Independent | Nathan Laven | 176 |
| | Ted Scott | 176 |
| Westwards | Margaret Daly | 60 |

=== Waiheke Local Board (5) ===
| Affiliation (if any) | Name | Votes |
|---|---|---|
| | Paul Walden | 2,293 |
| | Beatle Treadwell | 2,236 |
| Independent | Shirin Brown | 1,909 |
| | Becs Ballard | 1,797 |
| | John Meeuwsen | 1,679 |
| Independent | Sue McCann | 1,390 |
| Waiheke 'A' Team | Don McKenzie | 1,333 |
| Waiheke 'A' Team | Faye Storder | 1,246 |
| Waiheke 'A' Team | Jo Holmes | 1,187 |
| Independent | Richard Melville | 925 |
| | Ross Gillespie | 676 |
| Independent | Graham Hooper | 381 |

=== Puketapapa Local Board (6) ===
| Affiliation (if any) | Name | Votes |
|---|---|---|
| Roskill Community Voice | Michael Wood | 7,163 |
| Roskill Community Voice | Julie Fairey | 6,591 |
| Communities and Residents | Nigel Turnbull | 6,207 |
| Roskill Community Voice | David Holm | 5,593 |
| Communities and Residents | Ella Kumar | 5,564 |
| Roskill Community Voice | Harry Doig | 5,496 |
| Communities and Residents | Richard Barter | 5,135 |
| Roskill Community Voice | Shail Kaushal | 5,023 |
| Communities and Residents | Peter Muys | 4,911 |
| Roskill Community Voice | Garth Houltham | 4,636 |
| Conservatives | Paul Sommer | 2,125 |
| Independent | Peter Eccles | 1,844 |
| Conservatives | Joseph Rebello | 1,620 |
| | Darren Pigg | 1,534 |
| | Hari Shankar | 1,217 |

=== Ōrākei Local Board (7) ===
| Affiliation (if any) | Name | Votes |
|---|---|---|
| Communities and Residents | Desley Simpson | 17,150 |
| Communities and Residents | Mark Thomas | 16,714 |
| Communities and Residents | Troy Churton | 15,570 |
| Communities and Residents | Colin Davis | 14,606 |
| Communities and Residents | Ken Baguley | 14,473 |
| Communities and Residents | Kit Parkinson | 14,224 |
| Communities and Residents | Kate Cooke | 13,586 |
| Green Party | Dorthe Siggard | 6,940 |
| Independent | Bill Carlin | 6,593 |
| Conservatives | Andrew Craig | 5,662 |
| | Jennie Hayman | 4,320 |

=== Maungakiekie-Tamaki Local Board ===
==== Tamaki Subdivision Local Board (4) ====
| Affiliation (if any) | Name | Votes |
|---|---|---|
| Labour | Josephine Bartley | 6,233 |
| Labour | Chris Makoare | 5,708 |
| Labour | Alan Verrall | 5,548 |
| Labour | Obed Unasa | 4,392 |
| Independent | Jocelyn Calvert | 2,587 |
| Independent | Patrick O'Meara | 2,435 |
| Independent | Yvonne Dainty | 2,125 |
| | Makelesi Ngata | 1,847 |

==== Maungakiekie Subdivision Local Board (3) ====
| Affiliation (if any) | Name | Votes |
|---|---|---|
| Maungakiekie Team | Brett Clark | elected unopposed |
| Maungakiekie Team | Bridget Graham | elected unopposed |
| Maungakiekie Team | Simon Randall | elected unopposed |

=== Howick Local Board ===
==== Botany Subdivision Local Board (3) ====
| Affiliation (if any) | Name | Votes |
|---|---|---|
| Vision & Voice – Botany | Lucy Schwaner | 4,327 |
| Independent | Bob Wichman | 4,067 |
| Vision & Voice – Botany | Gary Boles | 3,791 |
| Vision & Voice – Botany | Peter Young | 3,474 |
| Residents and Ratepayers | Michael Williams | 3,286 |
| Independent | Mike Turinsky | 3,145 |
| Conservatives | Paul Young | 2,854 |
| Independent | Neelam Choudary | 2,750 |

==== Howick Subdivision Local Board (3) ====
| Affiliation (if any) | Name | Votes |
|---|---|---|
| Vision & Voice – Howick | Adele White | 6,289 |
| Independent | John Spiller | 6,086 |
| Residents and Ratepayers | Jim Donald | 4,505 |
| Independent | Murray Burton | 3,578 |
| 'Vision & Voice – Howick | David Ellery | 3,371 |
| Independent | Jenny Foster | 3,327 |
| Conservatives | Andrew Craig | 2,715 |
| Vision & Voice – Howick | Bruce Urquhart | 2,423 |

==== Pakuranga Subdivision Local Board (3) ====
| Affiliation (if any) | Name | Votes |
|---|---|---|
| Vision & Voice – Pakuranga | David Collings | 5,204 |
| Vision & Voice – Pakuranga | Katrina Bungard | 4,419 |
| Independent | Steve Udy | 3,957 |
| Vision & Voice – Pakuranga | Simon Williamson | 2,904 |
| Residents and Ratepayers | Shirley Warren | 2,727 |
| Residents and Ratepayers | Wayne Huang | 2,712 |
| Independent | Rowan Hegley | 2,697 |
| Independent | Heather Mackay | 2,025 |
| Conservatives | Darron Gedge | 1,810 |

=== Kaipātiki Local Board (8) ===
| Affiliation (if any) | Name | Votes |
|---|---|---|
| Team of Independents | Grant Gillon | 9,800 |
| Kaipatiki Voice | Ann Hartley | 9,602 |
| Kaipatiki Voice | Richard Hills | 7,931 |
| Kaipatiki Voice | Lindsay Waugh | 7,484 |
| Team of Independents | John Gillion | 7,384 |
| Team of Independents | Lorene Pigg | 6,631 |
| Kaipatiki Voice | Kay Mcintire | 6,507 |
| Kaipatiki Voice | Danielle Grant | 5,743 |
| | Nick Kearney | 5,222 |
| Transport Action | Chris Marshall | 5,193 |
| | Nerida Ashcroft | 4,783 |
| Independent | Calum Macpherson | 4,722 |
| Kaipatiki Voice | Ben Rodgers | 4,700 |
| Conservatives | Elaine Ford | 4,476 |
| Better Rates Return for Kaipatiki | Peter Burn | 4,442 |
| Independent | Bill Plunkett | 4,375 |
| Ratepayer's Choice | Martin Lawes | 4,143 |
| Independent | Ivan Dunn | 3,655 |
| Independent | Mary-Ann Benson-Cooper | 3,611 |
| Team of Independents | Gary Stephen Thornton | 3,383 |
| Independent | Bob Gentil | 3,209 |
| Independent | Mike Cranshaw | 3,108 |
| Independent | Edward Benson-Cooper | 2,749 |

=== Mangere-Otahuhu Local Board (7) ===
| Affiliation (if any) | Name | Votes |
|---|---|---|
| Labour | Carrol Elliot | 9,518 |
| Labour | Christine Francis O'Brien | 8,621 |
| Labour | Nick Leiloa Bakulich | 8,491 |
| Labour | Lydia Sosene | 8,408 |
| Labour | Walter Togiamua | 8,303 |
| Labour | Leau Peter Skelton | 8,262 |
| Labour | Tafafunai Tasi Lauese | 7,740 |
| Mana | James Papali'l | 3,902 |
| Mana | Kayla Filimoehala | 3,828 |
| Mana | Roger Fowler | 3,259 |
| Conservatives | Kevin Stitt | 3,210 |
| Independent | Roger Gummer | 3,195 |
| Independent | Sam Patua | 2,910 |
| Mana | Joe Trinder | 2,209 |

=== Otara-Papatoetoe Local Board ===
==== Papatoetoe Subdivision Local Board (4) ====
| Affiliation (if any) | Name | Votes |
|---|---|---|
| Team Papatoetoe | Ross Robertson | 6,074 |
| Papatoetoe Local Independents | Donna Lee | 4,480 |
| Papatoetoe Local Independents | John McCraken | 3,839 |
| Papatoetoe Local Independents | Stephen Grey | 3,541 |
| Team Papatoetoe | Sina Aiolupotea-Aiono | 3,306 |
| Team Papatoetoe | Alistaire Hall | 3,091 |
| Team Papatoetoe | Ashraf Choudhary | 3,012 |
| Papatoetoe Local Independents | Paul O'Brien | 2,616 |

==== Otara Subdivision Local Board (3) ====
| Affiliation (if any) | Name | Votes |
|---|---|---|
| Labour | Efeso Collins | 3,110 |
| Labour | Lotu Fuli | 2,889 |
| Labour | Mary Gush | 2,529 |
| Otara Local Independents | Poutoa Papali'i | 2,170 |
| Otara Local Independents | Willie Maea | 1,618 |
| Otara First | Jim Sinclair | 1,384 |
| | Tupou Tamata Manapori | 1,084 |
| Otara Local Independents | Jenn Jefferson | 950 |
| Independent | Vanessa Naden | 437 |
| Mana | Ian Hei Hei | 416 |

=== Franklin Local Board ===
==== Waiuku Subdivision of the Franklin Local Board (2) ====
| Affiliation (if any) | Name | Votes |
|---|---|---|
| Team Franklin | Jill Naysmith | 2,140 |
| Team Franklin | Brendon Crompton | 1,905 |
| Independent | Daniel Lynch | 1,486 |
| Conservatives | Rick Drayson | 645 |

==== Pukekohe Subdivision of the Franklin Local Board (4) ====
| Affiliation (if any) | Name | Votes |
|---|---|---|
| Team Franklin | Andy Baker | 4,713 |
| Team Franklin | Sarah Higgins | 4,079 |
| Team Franklin | Alan Cole | 3,756 |
| Team Franklin | Murray Arthur Kay | 3,387 |
| Independent | Paul Muir | 3,234 |
| Affordable Auckland | Niko Kloeten | 2,995 |
| | Magan Ranchhod | 2,264 |
| Independent | Ian Bell | 1,650 |

==== Wairoa Subdivision of the Franklin Local Board (3) ====
| Affiliation (if any) | Name | Votes |
|---|---|---|
| Team Franklin | Angela Fulljames | 3,030 |
| Team Franklin | Malcom Bell | 2,905 |
| Independent | Lyn Murphy | 2,789 |
| Independent | Lance Gedge | 2,423 |
| Team Franklin | Rowan Muir | 2,389 |

=== Manurewa Local Board (8) ===
| Affiliation (if any) | Name | Votes |
|---|---|---|
| Manurewa Action Team | Angela Dalton | 8,689 |
| Manurewa Action Team | George Hawkins | 8,053 |
| Manurewa Action Team | Ken Penny | 7,917 |
| Manurewa Action Team | Micheal Bailey | 7,833 |
| Manurewa Action Team | Simeon Brown | 7,539 |
| Manurewa Action Team | Angela Cunningham-Marino | 6,521 |
| Manurewa Action Team | Daryl Wrightson | 6,431 |
| Manurewa Action Team | Danella McCormick | 6,040 |
| Team Manurewa | Toa Greening | 5,756 |
| Team Manurewa | Elizabeth Barrowman | 5,569 |
| Team Manurewa | Micheal Joy | 4,312 |
| Team Manurewa | Jane Logan | 3,749 |
| Team Manurewa | Judi Goldsworthy | 3,713 |
| Team Manurewa | Ezekiel Robson | 3,691 |
| Team Manurewa | Barney Manaia | 3,658 |
| Team Manurewa | Lilian Cattell | 3,218 |
| | Vivienne Wilson | 3,031 |
| Independent | Neville Farrelly | 2,742 |
| Independent | John Hall | 2,854 |

=== Papakura Local Board (8) ===
| Affiliation (if any) | Name | Votes |
|---|---|---|
| Papakura First | Bill Mcentee | 5,675 |
| Papakura First | Graham Purdy | 4,718 |
| Papakura First | Katrina Winn | 4,515 |
| Papakura First | Michael Turner | 4,442 |
| Papakura First | Stuart Britnell | 4,035 |
| Independent | Brent Catchpole | 3,848 |
| Papakura First | Simon Goodall | 3,411 |
| Independent | Katrina Piggott | 3,392 |
| Team Papakura | John Robinson | 3,210 |
| Team Papakura | Felicity Jane Auva'a | 3,200 |
| Team Papakura | Hine Joyce-Tahere | 2,831 |
| Team Papakura | Nicky Hayhow | 2,626 |
| Labour | Jill Ovens | 1,799 |
| Labour | Len Richards | 1,786 |
| Conservatives | Andrew Craig | 1,532 |

== See also ==
- 2013 New Zealand local elections
- 2013 Auckland local elections
