= 2013 Auckland Council election =

- 12 October 2013

All 20 seats of the Governing body of the Auckland Council
	First party	Second party	Third party
Party	C&R	Labour	City Vision
Last election	5 seats, 22.93%	2 seats, 4.82%	1 seat, 3.92%
Seats won	3	2	1
Seat change	▼2	0	0
Popular vote	47,833	43,095	26,725
Percentage	10.59%	9.54%	5.92%
Swing	▼12.34	▲4.72%	▲2.00%

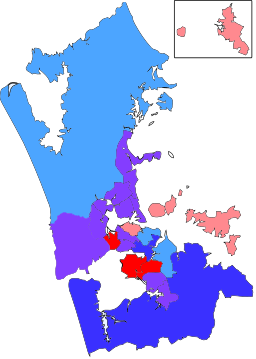
2013 Auckland Council Election Results

The 2013 Auckland Council election took place between 20 September and 12 October and were conducted by postal vote. The elections were the second since the merger of seven councils into the Auckland Council, which is composed of the mayor and 20 councillors, and 149 members of 21 local boards. Twenty-one district health board members and 41 licensing trust members were also elected. The previous elections were in 2010. Early (not final) voting figures are below. The overall effect of the election was a shift of the Auckland Council to the right.

== Mayoral election ==
Incumbent Len Brown was re-elected.

2013 Auckland mayoral election
Party	Candidate	Votes	%	±%
Independent	Len Brown	164,338	47.78	−1.46
Independent	John Palino	108,928	31.67	—
Affordable Auckland	Stephen Berry	13,650	3.97	—
Independent	Penny Bright	11,723	3.41	+2.85
Mana	John Minto	11,591	3.37	—
Independent	Uesifili Unasa	8,040	2.34	—
Working for the Homeless	Wayne Young	3,943	1.15	+1.03
Independent	Reuben Shadbolt	3,152	0.92	—
None	Paul Duffy	3,083	0.90	—
Christians Against Abortion	Phil O'Connor	3,032	0.88	+0.61
Independent	Emmett Hussey	2,974	0.86	—
Independent	Susanna Susara Kruger	2,173	0.63	—
None	Matthew Goode	2,116	0.62	—
Roads First	David Willmott	1,647	0.48	+0.37
None	Jesse Butler	1,465	0.43	—
None	Tricia Cheel	1,214	0.35	—
Communist League	Annalucia Vermunt	856	0.25	+0.16
Majority		55,410	16.11	+2.44
Total valid votes		343,925	99.54	
Informal votes		1,584	0.46	
Turnout		345,509	34.72	−15.45
Registered electors		995,206		

== Council ward elections ==
20 members were elected to governing body of the Auckland Council across thirteen wards.

=== Rodney (1) ===
Affiliation (if any)	Name	Votes
Independent	Penny Webster	8587
Independent	Steven Robert Garner	5616
	Informal/blank	1101

=== Albany (2) ===
Affiliation (if any)	Name	Votes
Putting People First	Wayne Walker	13918
Putting People First	John Watson	12936
Independent	Lisa Whyte	11646
Independent	Julia Parfitt	11075
Independent	Brent Robinson	7782
Independent	Mary-Anne Benson-Cooper	3967
Independent	Kevin Moorhead	3480
Independent	Tricia Cheel	1728
	Informal/blank	2715

=== North Shore (2) ===
Affiliation (if any)	Name	Votes
Taking The Shore Forward	Chris Darby	14802
Fair Deal For Shore	George Wood	14086
Independent	Ann Hartley	13072
Team of Independents	Grant Gillon	12273
Fair Deal For Shore	Joseph Bergin	9515
Independent	Calum Macpherson	4749
	Informal/blank	1239

=== Waitakere (2) ===
Affiliation (if any)	Name	Votes
West At Heart	Penny Hulse	19498
Independent	Linda Cooper	11437
Independent	Christine Rose	9877
Independent	Brian Neeson	8964
Affordable Auckland	Peter Chan	7413
Independent	Jason Woolston	3500
Mana	Douglas Robertson	2067
Independent	Allan Fazakerley	1932
	Informal/blank	1356

=== Waitemata and Gulf (1) ===
Affiliation (if any)	Name	Votes
Independent	Mike Lee	8886
Independent	Greg Moyle	4061
Independent	Rob Thomas	3155
Affordable Auckland	Stephen Berry	1435
Independent	Charlotte Fisher	1055
Independent	Aleksandar Zivaljevic	398
	Informal/blank	1578

=== Whau (1) ===
Affiliation (if any)	Name	Votes
Labour	Ross Clow	6227
Independent	Noelene Raffills	6176
Community First	Duncan MacDonald	3843
	Informal/blank	1325

=== Albert-Eden-Roskill (2) ===
Affiliation (if any)	Name	Votes
Communities & Residents	Christine Fletcher	17939
City Vision	Cathy Casey	16545
Communities & Residents	Nigel Turnbull	13233
City Vision	Peter Haynes	10180
Liveable Communities	Phil Chase	5995
Transparency New Zealand	Grace Haden	4021
	Informal/blank	1937

=== Maungakiekie-Tamaki (1) ===
Affiliation (if any)	Name	Votes
Communities & Residents	Denise Krum	8483
Labour	Richard Northey	7585
	Informal/blank	998

=== Manukau (2) ===
Affiliation (if any)	Name	Votes
Labour	Alf Filipaina	17441
Independent	Arthur Anae	12961
Labour	Tunumafono Ava Fa'amoe	11842
Mana	Roger Fowler	4213
Independent	Avtar Hans	3679
Mana	Joe Trinder	2192
Communist League	Baskaran Appu	1154
	Informal/blank	1385

=== Manurewa-Papakura (2) ===
Affiliation (if any)	Name	Votes
Independent for Manurewa-Papakura	John Walker	15577
Independent for Manurewa-Papakura	Calum Penrose	13696
Team South	Colleen Brown	10331
Team South	Peter Goldsmith	5205
Mana	James Papali'i	2537
Mana	Barry Tumai	1644
	Informal/blank	787

=== Franklin (1) ===
Affiliation (if any)	Name	Votes
Team Franklin C&R	Bill Cashmore	8178
Independent	Lynn Murphy	4295
Affordable Auckland	Niko Kloeten	3727
	Informal/blank	843

=== Ōrākei (1) ===
Affiliation (if any)	Name	Votes
Independent	Cameron Brewer	elected unopposed

=== Howick (2) ===
Affiliation (if any)	Name	Votes
Independent	Dick Quax	elected unopposed
Independent	Sharon Stewart	elected unopposed

== Licensing trust elections ==
=== Birkenhead Licensing Trust (6) ===
Affiliation (if any)	Name	Votes
Independent	Bill Plunkett	4565
Team of Independents	Paula Gillion	4410
Independent	Marilyn Nicholls	4285
Independent	Stuart Wier	4119
Kaipatiki Voice	Scott Espie	3886
	Shane Prince	3458
Independent	Merv Adair	3122

=== Mt Wellington Licensing Trust (6) ===
Affiliation (if any)	Name	Votes
Labour	Leila Boyle	4368
Labour	Alan Verrall	4145
Labour	Mike Murray	4067
Labour	Jenifer Salesa	3683
Labour	Mary-Ann De Koort	3648
Labour	Denise Eggers	3506
Independent	Leanne Margaret Cross	2400
Independent	Bryan Mockridge	2224
Independent	Jocelyn Calvert	2158

=== Portage Licensing Trust ===
==== Ward No 1 – Auckland City (3) ====
Affiliation (if any)	Name	Votes
City Vision	Catherine Farmer	4163
Community First	Duncan Macdonald	4105
Community Independents	Kathryn Davie	3362
City Vision	Loraine Wilson	3353
City Vision	Margi Watson	3200
Community Independents	Paul Davie	2758
Community First	Raj Mitra	2531
Community First	Gordon Gibbons	2321
Community Independents	Manilal Patel	1377
Independent	Alan John Thompson	1148

==== Ward No 2 – New Lynn (2) ====
Affiliation (if any)	Name	Votes
Community First	Graeme Elison	Elected Unopposed
Independents	Sandy Taylor	Elected Unopposed

==== Ward No 3 – Glen Eden (2) ====
Affiliation (if any)	Name	Votes
Progressive Independents	Janet Clews	1459
Future West	Neil Henderson	1392
Independent	Gayle Marshall	1347
Future West	Jack Henderson	1064

==== Ward No 4 – Titirangi / Green Bay (2) ====
Affiliation (if any)	Name	Votes
Independent	Ross Clow	2917
Future West	Greg Presland	2724
Independent	Tracy Mulholland	1838
West Wards	Linda Potauaine	1336
	Jason Woolston	1246
Independent	Tenna Speedy	971
Community First	Tam Canter-Visscher	783

==== Ward No 5 – Kelston West (1) ====
Affiliation (if any)	Name	Votes
Labour	Ami Chand	Elected Unopposed

==== Waitakere Licensing Trust ====
===== Ward No 1 – Te Atatū (2) =====
Affiliation (if any)	Name	Votes
Independent	Ross Dallow	2906
	John Tamihere	2335
Independent	Tracy Kirkley	2309
Labour	Cheryl Brown-Talamaivao	1940
	Wayne Bainbridge	1638
Independent	Bob Stanic	1530
Independent	Elizabeth Grimmer	1464

===== Ward No 2 –Lincoln (3) =====
Affiliation (if any)	Name	Votes
Independent	Linda Cooper	8563
Independent	Warren William Flaunty	7311
Independent	Brian Neeson	7181
West Wards	Mahendra Sharma	2991

===== Ward No 3 – Waitakere (1) =====
Affiliation (if any)	Name	Votes
Future West	Steve Tollestrup	1428
Totally Independent	Judy Lawley	1421
Independent	Paul Mitchell	1090
Independent	Mark Bellingham	798
Independent	Heather Tanguay	272

===== Ward No 4 – Henderson (1) =====
Affiliation (if any)	Name	Votes
Independent	Assid Corban	Elected Unopposed

==== Wiri Licensing Trust (6) ====
Affiliation (if any)	Name	Votes
Manurewa Action Team	Ken Penney	9606
Manurewa Action Team	Grant Dalton	9153
Manurewa Action Team	Stella Cattle	8327
Manurewa Action Team	Duncan White	7919
Manurewa Action Team	Rangi Maclean	7855
Independent	Alan Johnson	7350
Independent	Mote Pahulu	4897

== See also ==
- 2013 New Zealand local elections
- 2013 Auckland local board elections
