= Penny Hulse =

New Zealand politician

Penny Hulse MNZM
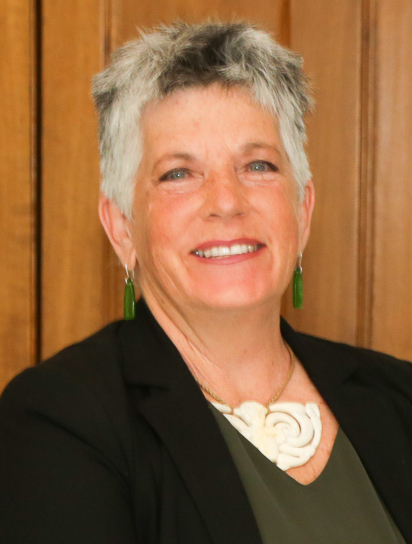
- Hulse in 2020

Waitākere Ward Councillor
- In office 2010–2019 Serving with Sandra Coney; Linda Cooper
- Mayor: Len Brown; Phil Goff
- Preceded by: Office Created
- Succeeded by: Shane Henderson

1st Deputy Mayor of Auckland
- In office 1 November 2010 – 8 October 2016
- Mayor: Len Brown
- Preceded by: Office Created
- Succeeded by: Bill Cashmore

Deputy Mayor of Waitakere City
- In office 2007–2010
- Preceded by: Carolynne Stone
- Succeeded by: herself as Deputy Mayor of Auckland

Personal details
- Born: South Africa
- Relations: 2
- Website: www.pennyhulse.co.nz

Penelope Anne Hulse MNZM is a New Zealand politician, and was Deputy Mayor of Auckland from the formation of the Auckland Council Super City until 2016. She continued to represent the Waitākere Ward on the Auckland Council for one more term and was chair of the Environment and Community Committee.

== Political career ==
Auckland Council
| Years | Ward | Affiliation |
|---|---|---|
| 2010–2013 | Waitākere | Independent |
| 2013–2016 | Waitākere | West at Heart |
| 2016–2019 | Waitākere | West at Heart |

Hulse, born in South Africa, began her career in 1992 when she was elected to the Waitakere Community Board. As a board member, Hulse worked together with Dave Harré to save the Avondale railway station building, which was planned for demolition due to its poor state. After lobbying the New Zealand Railways Corporation, the station was refurbished and relocated to Swanson. In 1995 she was elected to the Waitakere City Council. She was made deputy mayor in 2007 by Bob Harvey.

In the 2010 Auckland Council elections Hulse won a seat in the Waitākere Ward. She was then made deputy mayor by Len Brown. She was re-elected in 2013. Hulse lives in Te Atatū Peninsula and took up cycling to work in the Auckland CBD when the Nelson Street Cycleway was opened in December 2015.

Hulse was re-elected to Council in 2016 and also the Waitakere Licensing Trust. The new Mayor of Auckland, Phil Goff, did not reappoint her as deputy mayor and instead appointed her as the chairperson of the environment and community committee.

She retired from Auckland Council at the 2019 local government elections. Since then she has served on the board of Kāinga Ora and on the independent panel reviewing the future for local government.

In the 2020 New Year Honours, Hulse was appointed a Member of the New Zealand Order of Merit, for services to local government.
