= North Shore ward =

- Ward of Auckland
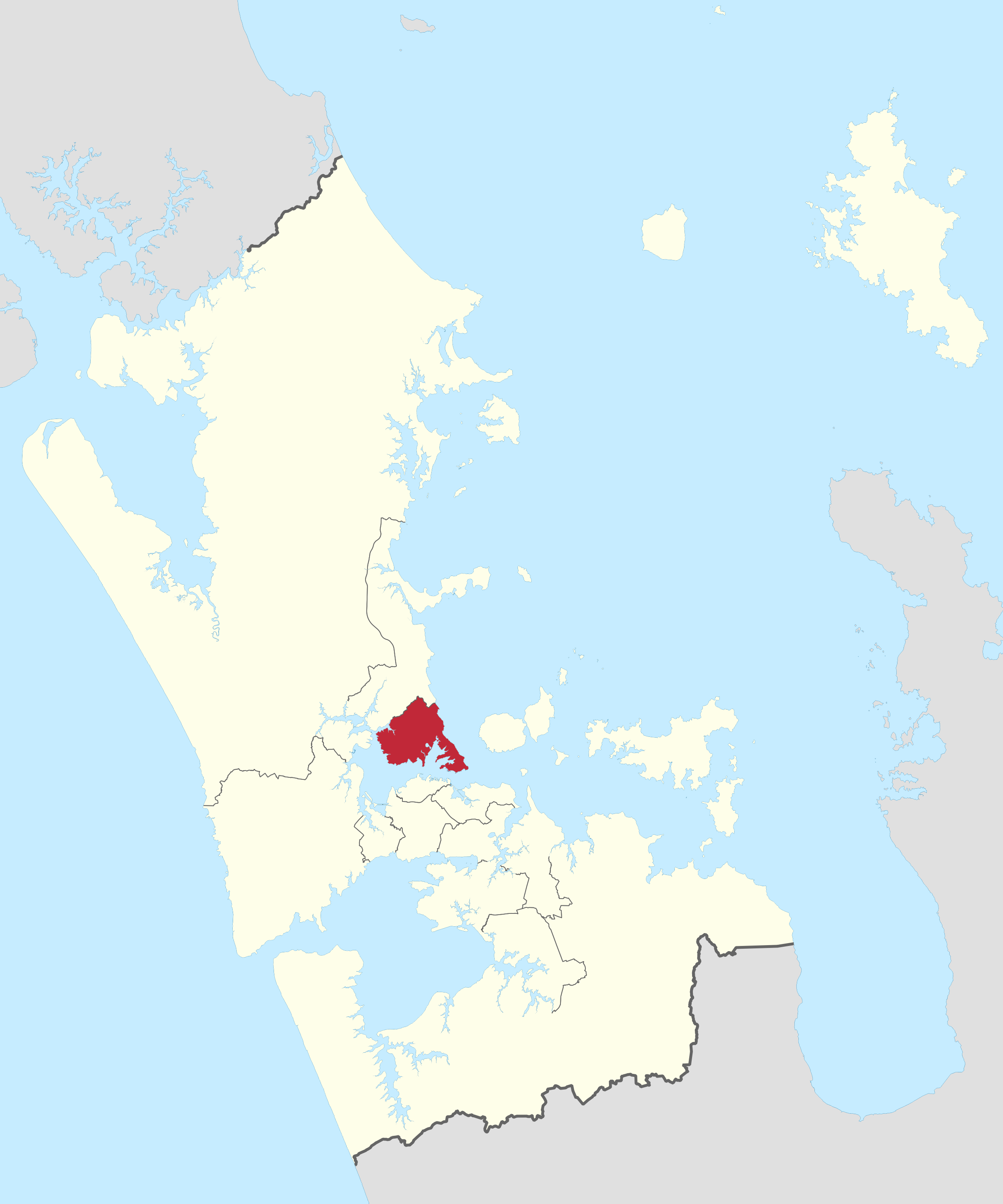
- Country: New Zealand
- Island: North Island
- Region: Auckland Region

Area
  - Land: 54.17 km^{2} (20.92 sq mi)

Population (June 2025)
  - Total: 156,700
  - Density: 2,893/km^{2} (7,492/sq mi)

The North Shore ward is an Auckland Council ward that elects two councillors and covers the Devonport-Takapuna and Kaipātiki Local Boards. The two councillors are currently Richard Hills and John Gillon.

== Demographics ==
North Shore ward covers 54.17 km^{2} (20.92 sq mi) and had an estimated population of 156,700 as of June 2025, with a population density of 2,893 people per km^{2}.

Historical population
Year	Pop.	±% p.a.
2006	131,784	—
2013	137,961	+0.66%
2018	146,241	+1.17%
2023	146,130	−0.02%

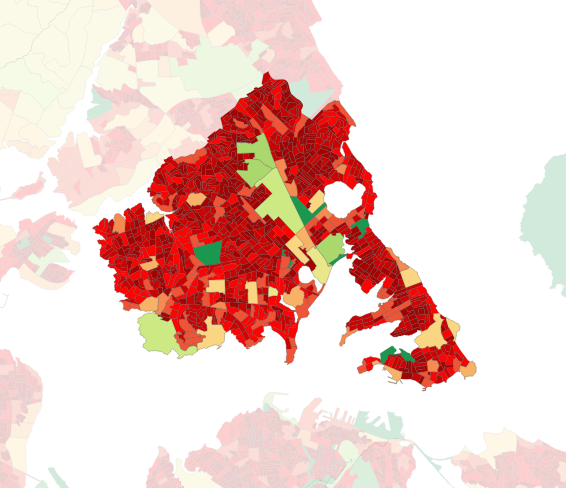
Population density in the 2023 census

North Shore ward had a population of 146,130 in the 2023 New Zealand census, a decrease of 111 people (−0.1%) since the 2018 census, and an increase of 8,169 people (5.9%) since the 2013 census. There were 71,568 males, 74,031 females and 531 people of other genders in 51,303 dwellings. 3.7% of people identified as LGBTIQ+. The median age was 37.7 years (compared with 38.1 years nationally). There were 26,082 people (17.8%) aged under 15 years, 28,626 (19.6%) aged 15 to 29, 69,783 (47.8%) aged 30 to 64, and 21,642 (14.8%) aged 65 or older.

People could identify as more than one ethnicity. The results were 60.4% European (Pākehā); 8.2% Māori; 5.2% Pasifika; 32.5% Asian; 3.4% Middle Eastern, Latin American and African New Zealanders (MELAA); and 2.1% other, which includes people giving their ethnicity as "New Zealander". English was spoken by 92.8%, Māori language by 1.6%, Samoan by 0.8%, and other languages by 31.2%. No language could be spoken by 2.2% (e.g. too young to talk). New Zealand Sign Language was known by 0.3%. The percentage of people born overseas was 45.4, compared with 28.8% nationally.

Religious affiliations were 32.0% Christian, 2.6% Hindu, 1.7% Islam, 0.3% Māori religious beliefs, 1.8% Buddhist, 0.4% New Age, 0.2% Jewish, and 1.4% other religions. People who answered that they had no religion were 53.9%, and 5.8% of people did not answer the census question.

Of those at least 15 years old, 47,664 (39.7%) people had a bachelor's or higher degree, 47,730 (39.8%) had a post-high school certificate or diploma, and 24,657 (20.5%) people exclusively held high school qualifications. The median income was $50,200, compared with $41,500 nationally. 22,005 people (18.3%) earned over $100,000 compared to 12.1% nationally. The employment status of those at least 15 was that 65,895 (54.9%) people were employed full-time, 15,798 (13.2%) were part-time, and 3,036 (2.5%) were unemployed.

== Councillors ==
North Shore Ward councillors of Auckland
- Incumbent; Richard Hills; John Gillon
- Term length: Three years
- Inaugural holder: George Wood; Ann Hartley
- Formation: 1 November 2010
- Website: www.aucklandcouncil.govt.nz

Election		Councillors Elected	Affiliation	Votes	Notes
2010	1	George Wood	Citizens & Ratepayers – North Shore	14902	
2010	2	Ann Hartley	Shore Voice	13616	
2013	1	Chris Darby	Taking The Shore Forward	14802	
2013	2	George Wood	Fair Deal For the Shore	14086	
2016	1	Chris Darby	Taking the Shore Forward	19396	
2016	2	Richard Hills	A Positive Voice for the Shore	12651	
2019	1	Richard Hills	A Positive Voice for the Shore	18746	
2019	2	Chris Darby	Taking The Shore Forward	17559	
2022	1	Richard Hills	A Positive Voice for the Shore	19269	
2022	2	Chris Darby	For the Shore	17123	
2025	1	Richard Hills	Positive Leadership for the Shore	21,325	
2025	2	John Gillon	Putting the North Shore First	17,166	

== Election results ==
Election results for the North Shore ward:

=== 2025 election results ===
North Shore ward
Party	Candidate	Votes	%	±%
Independent	Richard Hills^{†}	21,325	62.90	+15.52
Independent	John Gillon	17,166	50.63	(new)
Independent	Danielle Grant	12,585	37.12	+1.26
ACT Local	Helena Roza	6,368	18.78	(new)
Independent	Eric Chuah	3,625	10.69	(new)
Informal votes		45	0.13	−0.01
Blank votes		471	1.39	−1.52
Turnout		33,905	31.03	−6.78
Registered electors		109,265		
Independent hold				
Independent gain from Independent				
^{†} incumbent

=== 2022 election results ===
	Name	Affiliation	Votes
1	Richard Hills	A Positive Voice for the Shore	19269
2	Chris Darby	For the Shore	17123
	Danielle Grant	Communities and Residents – North Shore	14584
	George Wood	Communities and Residents – North Shore	12009
	Tony Bunting	Independent	4370
	Raymond Tan		3857
	Adrian Tyler		3270
Blank			1182
Informal			55

=== 2019 election results ===
	Name	Affiliation	Votes
1	Richard Hills	A Positive Voice for the Shore	18746
2	Chris Darby	Taking the Shore Forward	17559
	Danielle Grant	More For The Shore	15071
	Grant Gillon	More For The Shore	14300
	Anthony Bunting	Independent	3976
Blank			1462
Informal			38

=== 2016 election results ===
	Name	Affiliation	Votes	%
1	Chris Darby	Taking the Shore Forward	19,396	25.8%
2	Richard Hills	A Positive Voice for the Shore	12,651	16.8%
	Grant Gillon	Shore Action	12,523	16.6%
	Danielle Grant	Auckland Future	6,415	8.5%
	Anne-Elise Smithson	Shore Action	5,967	7.9%
	Fay Freeman	Auckland Future	5,308	7.0%
	Mary-Anne Benson-Cooper	Independent	2,706	3.6%
	John Hill	Independent	2,363	3.1%
	Lesley Kahn	Independent	2,133	2.8%
	Damian Light	United Future	1,437	1.9%
	Michael Buttle	Independent	940	1.2%
	Tate Robertson	Independent	739	1.0%
Blank			2,607	3.5%
Informal			121	0.2%
Turnout			75,306	
