= Richard Hills (politician) =

New Zealand politician

Councillor Richard Hills

Member of the Auckland Council for the North Shore
- Incumbent
- Assumed office 1 November 2016 Serving with Chris Darby
- Preceded by: George Wood

Personal details
- Born: 1985 or 1986 (age 40–41)
- Party: Labour

Richard Brian Hills (born 1985 or 1986) is an Auckland Councillor who was elected at the 2016 Auckland elections. He is Auckland's youngest current councillor, the first openly gay Auckland Councillor and one of two Ngāpuhi iwi members. He has been an advocate for more investment in local youth and secured a youth centre in Glenfield.

== Political career ==
Hills is a member of the New Zealand Labour Party. At the 2011 general election he stood in Hunua and was ranked 50th on the party list. Hills finished second in Hunua, which was regarded as a safe National seat, behind incumbent Paul Hutchison.

At the 2013 Auckland elections, Hills was elected to the Kaipatiki Local Board.

Hills stood in Northcote at the 2014 general election, finishing second behind incumbent Jonathan Coleman. He was ranked 47th on the Labour party list.

In April 2018 Hills put his name forward for the Labour nomination in the Northcote by-election following Coleman's resignation. Hills failed to win the nomination and instead Shanan Halbert was selected to contest the Northcote seat for Labour.

=== Auckland Council ===
Auckland Council
Years	Ward	Affiliation
2016–2019	North Shore	A Positive Voice for the Shore
2019–2022	North Shore	A Positive Voice for the Shore
2022–present	North Shore	A Positive Voice for the Shore

At the 2016 Auckland elections, Hills stood for the Auckland Council, aiming to replace George Wood as a councillor for the North Shore ward. With 12,651 votes, he finished second after incumbent Chris Darby in the two-person ward and was elected. His majority over the third placed candidate, Grant Gillon, was only 128. Hills had campaigned alongside Darby during the campaign. Hills has been a champion for more affordable public transport in Auckland.

Hills was also re-elected to the Kaipātiki Local Board but was automatically excluded following his election as a councillor. He ranked first with 13,026 votes.

At the 2019 local body elections, Hills was re-elected as one of the two North Shore Ward councillors, to serve for the 2019–2022 term.

Hills was considering running for mayor in the 2022 Auckland mayoral election, however in February 2022 he announced he would instead run for re-election in the North Shore ward. It was widely reported that Hills was expected to run in the race.

He was re-elected to the Auckland Council in 2022.

Hills ran for re-election as a councillor in the 2025 elections and won.
