= George Wood (New Zealand politician) =

New Zealand politician

George Wood CNZM
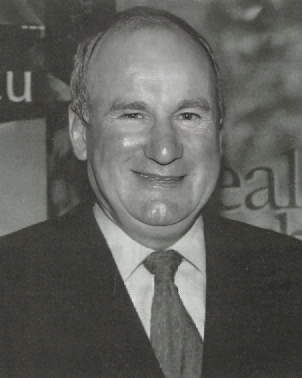
- Wood in 2001

4th Mayor of North Shore City
- In office 1998–2007
- Preceded by: George Gair
- Succeeded by: Andrew Williams

North Shore Ward Councillor
- In office 1 November 2010 – 14 October 2016 Serving with Ann Hartley and Chris Darby
- Preceded by: Office established
- Succeeded by: Richard Hills

Personal details
- Born: George Sydney Wood; 5 August 1946 (age 80) Birkenhead, New Zealand
- Spouse: Myra Wood
- Children: three
- Occupation: police officer (formerly)
- Website: www.georgewood.co.nz

George Sydney Wood CNZM (born 5 August 1946) is a former mayor of North Shore City and a former Auckland Councillor. He was the only North Shore City mayor to be elected for three terms and later represented North Shore ward on the Auckland Council between 2010 and 2016. He is now an elected member of the Devonport-Takapuna Local Board.

== Early life ==
Wood was born in Birkenhead on Auckland's North Shore. He was educated at Birkdale Primary School, Northcote Intermediate School and Northcote College.

== Police career ==
Wood originally worked for the New Zealand Police, primarily as a crime investigations manager. As a Police investigator, he worked on many inquiries and served at various times in Auckland, Rotorua and Palmerston North. In his final years of service (1995–98), he was the manager of Police services within North Shore City.

He is a graduate of the Royal New Zealand Air Force Command and Staff College and the Australian Institute of Police Management Sydney from where he gained a Graduate Certificate in Applied Management.

He is the recipient of a New Zealand Police long service and good conduct medal awarded in 1980.

== Political career ==
=== Mayor of North Shore City ===
In October 1998 Wood was elected Mayor of North Shore City following a fiercely contested election. Wood was able to bring together a new style of council administration with only three standing committees and all councillors members of these committees.

During his three consecutive terms as mayor (1998–2007), Wood was most successful in melding the council together and pushed through major reforms in relation to sewerage (waste water) infrastructure improvements, revamping the strategic plan and long term funding programme for North Shore City and developing and building the Northern Busway project.

==== Chairman of the Auckland Mayoral Forum ====
Following the 2001 local government elections Wood was elected to the position of chairman of the Auckland Mayoral Forum. In this role Wood pushed through a major joint programme between the Government and Auckland councils for transport funding. This culminated in the Government passing the Local Government Auckland Amendment Act 2004 and the provision of an additional $1.6 billion of transport funding over the following ten years. This extra funding has resulted in huge improvements to the Auckland roading and public transport networks.

=== Falun Gong ===
In April 2007, Wood acceded to pressure from Chinese officials not to attend an international cultural show by Divine Performing Arts, which contained scenes depicting the oppression of people who practice the Falun Gong spiritual system. Wood was planning to attend the show with his wife, but after a phone call from the Chinese Consular General's office he backed out, and was quoted as saying:

I don't want to get involved in internal People's Republic of China politics but I also want to maintain a reasonable relationship with the People's Republic of China. They said that [the show] was involved in Falun Gong, they indicated Falun Gong, and I don't know what the true impact of that is, but it obviously has some concerns for them.
I had indicated that I probably would go to the show, but I'm not going to cause an international kerfuffle by going to something that I don't know anything about. I don't know anything about the Falun Gong or whatever it means. I am a mayor of a city not an international diplomat and I haven't really got the time to analyse the thing out.

=== Hiatus from political office ===
Wood stood for a fourth term as an independent mayoralty candidate in the 2007 North Shore City elections but was defeated by Andrew Williams.

In the period since the October 2007 election Wood has worked behind the scenes on a number of projects mainly relating to transport. He is particularly vocal over the need to upgrade or replace the Auckland Harbour Bridge. Wood has also strongly urged the improvement of public transport across the Auckland region whilst at the same time warning about the huge escalation in operational costs. In 2009, in the lead up to the formation of Auckland Council, he questioned whether the new Auckland mayor would be able to control the proposed Auckland Transport Agency under the new proposed model.

In the 2008 New Year Honours, Wood was appointed a Companion of the New Zealand Order of Merit for services to local-body affairs.

=== Involvement in Auckland local government reform ===
In 2006, Wood indicated his support for the amalgamation of Auckland's seven city councils and boards into one 'supercity' Auckland council. Wood was one of four mayors who asked Prime Minister Helen Clark to reform the Auckland region's local government in September 2006. Subsequently the Royal Commission on Auckland Governance was formed to enquire into the future of local government across the Auckland region.

Wood submitted to the Commission with Wyn Hoadley. Their submission was well received by the three commissioners and received a positive report in the NZ Herald.

Wood and Hoadley called for one Auckland council across the region with a mayor elected at large, 13 elected and 5 appointed specialist councillors and 13 boroughs to replace the existing councils and community boards. They also recommended that an Environmental Protection Agency be appointed.

The high level of debt that the seven territorial councils and the Auckland Regional Council would bring to the new council, along with the negativity by existing councils, was a major concern to Wood. The figure of $3 billion debt that the new Auckland council will need to deal with has been quoted in the media.

Wood was concerned as to how the report of the Royal Commissioners on Auckland Governance would be implemented. He believed it should be a report delivered on a broad front and not implemented in a piecemeal manner.

=== Auckland Council ===
Auckland Council
Years	Ward	Affiliation
2010–2013	North Shore	Citizens & Ratepayers
2013–2016	North Shore	Fair Deal For Shore

Wood was a councillor on the Auckland Council from its inception in 2010 until 2016. He joined the Citizens and Ratepayers Association (C&R) and was elected to the council on the Citizens and Ratepayers–North Shore ticket to represent the North Shore ward. He topped the poll for this ward in the election.

In his inaugural speech to the council, Wood made particular reference to the need to address the recommendations of the Royal Commission report. He made a strong plea to the new council to become actively involved in pursuing improved social conditions and trying to ensure that fewer young people end up in prison.

Since the election he has spoken out to ensure that rates for property owners are kept under control. He voiced disappointment in not getting a lead position, especially in the transport area.

In his first term (2010–13), Wood was appointed chairman of the Community Safety Forum, and Deputy Chairman of the Accountability and Performance committee. A major revamp of the graffiti control and removal plan across the Auckland Region was undertaken under the direction of the Community Safety Forum chaired by Wood. The Auckland Council Graffiti Strategy document brought a number of organisations under one umbrella.

In mid-2013, Wood abandoned the Citizens and Ratepayers ticket and set up a new ticket named Fair Deal For Shore in order to contest that year's October council elections. He was re-elected as councillor for North Shore ward. Wood was the chair of the Auckland Council's Regional Strategy and Policy committee, which was a committee of the whole of council, meaning that it consisted of the mayor, 20 councillors and two representative of the Independent Maori Statutory Board.

The preparation of the Auckland Plan, a spatial plan for the future development of the Auckland Region over the next 40 years and adopted by Auckland Council in 2012, was a major interest for Wood.

Wood did not stand for Auckland Council in the 2016 local elections, but was elected to the Devonport-Takapuna local board on the Team George Wood ticket.

Wood has been a critic of the Auckland Council's draft Unitary Plan that was adopted in August 2016. Locations such as Milford and Browns Bay have resisted the idea of taller residential buildings than what was proposed in the plan. This was despite plaintive pleas from Mayor Len Brown.

== Personal life ==
Wood is married to Myra Wood.

Political offices
Preceded by George Gair	Mayor of North Shore City; 1998–2007	Succeeded by Andrew Williams
