= Nelson Street Cycleway =

Cycle route in Auckland, New Zealand

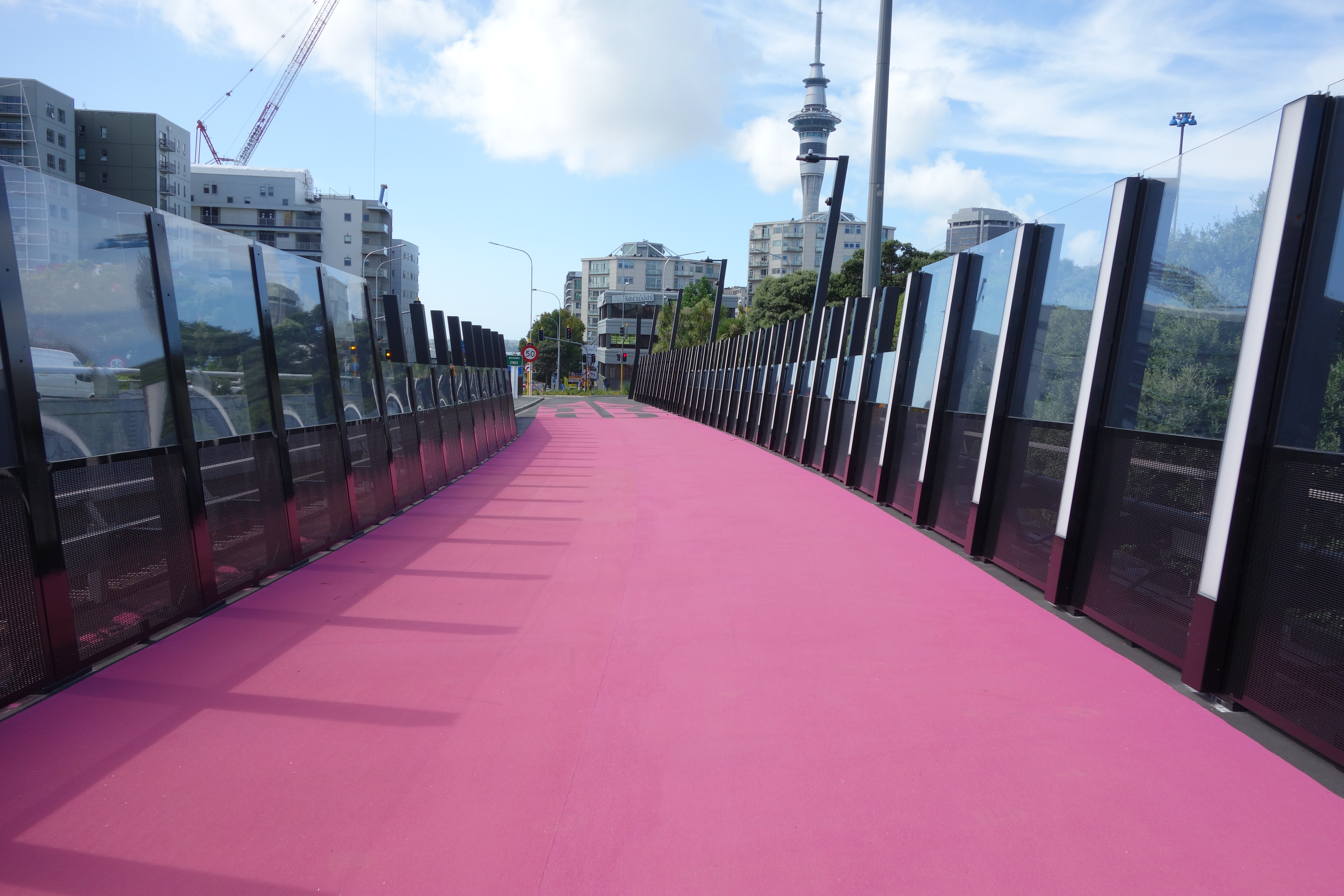
Lightpath / Te Ara I Whiti near the northern end, before continuing to the street section the Nelson Street Cycleway.

Nelson Street Cycleway

The Nelson Street Cycleway is a cycleway (and in some sections, a shared pathway for walking and cycling) in Auckland, New Zealand. The most well-known section of the path is Te Ara I Whiti, translated as, and commonly known as Lightpath (also known as the Pink Path). The cycleway then continues on to the Nelson Street arterial road into the City Centre.

Unique features of the old offramp are the hot-pink colour of its surface, and its LED mood lighting system that constantly changes; the latter feature inspired the Māori name.

Stage 1 of the project was opened on 3 December 2015, and Stage 2 opened in December 2017. The final Stage 3 opened in early 2023. The route provides access from Upper Queen Street to the Auckland CBD and the cycleway along the waterfront. Stage 1 utilises an unused off-ramp in the Central Motorway Junction (CMJ) where State Highway 1 and 16 cross – this is the section that is called Lightpath – plus the first three street blocks of Nelson Street up to Victoria Street West.

== Route ==
The chosen route starts at Upper Queen Street, linking there with the Northwestern Cycleway that has been extended to descend into Grafton Gully via the Symonds Street Cemetery. Turning off Upper Queen Street into Canada Street, a new bridge connects to the old Nelson Street off-ramp. The motorway infrastructure links into the urban road network at traffic lights at Union Street. From here, a protected cycleway runs along the left side of Nelson Street for three blocks, crossing Cook Street and Wellesley Street West at traffic lights. The route currently finishes at Victoria Street West, where the facility crosses the signalised intersection diagonally to the north-east quadrant.

== History ==
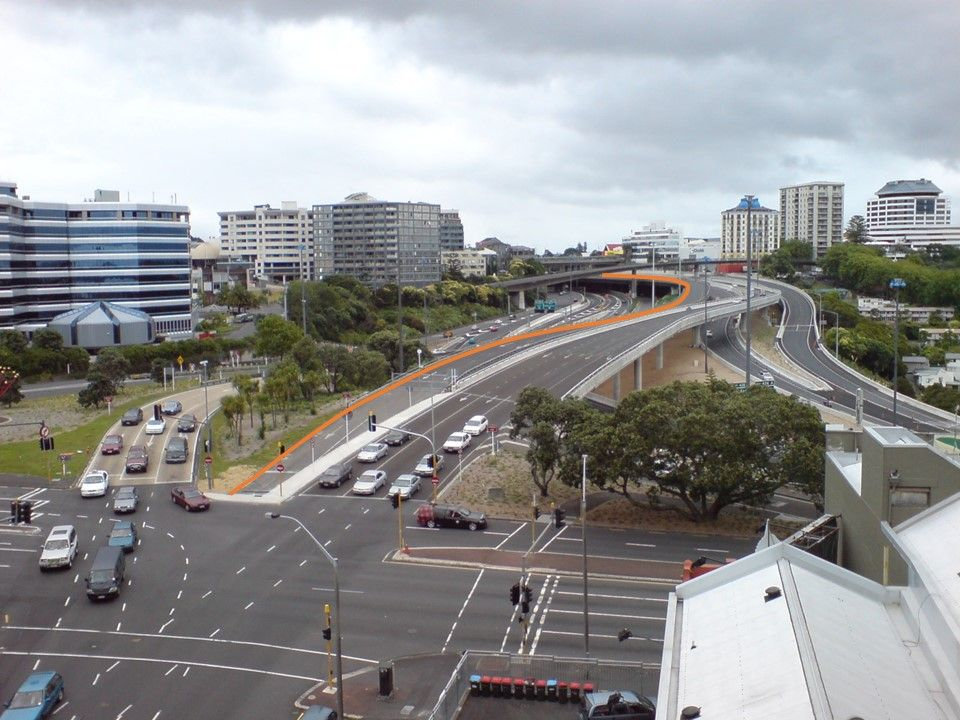
Nelson Street old off-ramp (highlighted) in 2007

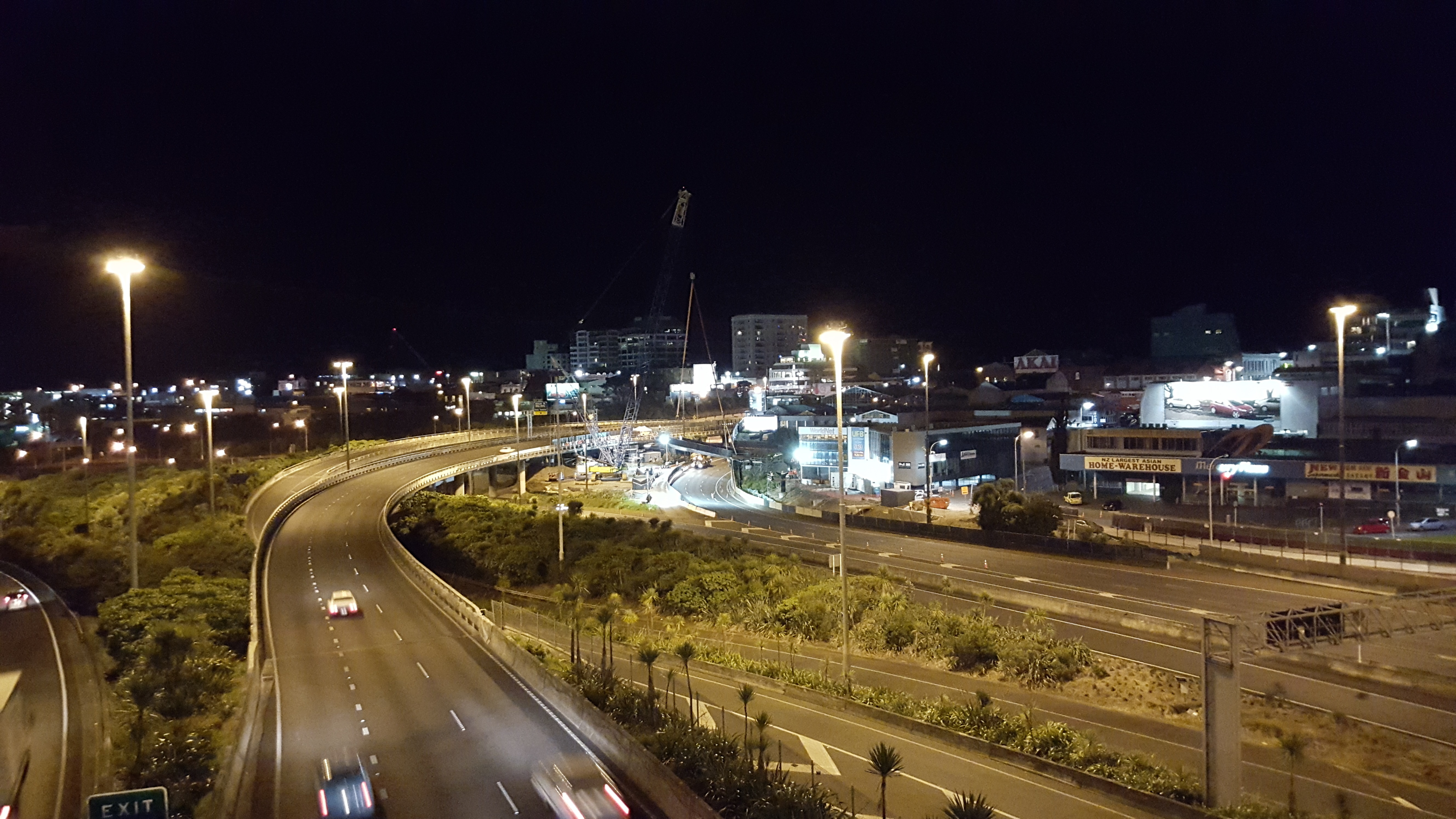
Night works lifting in the prefabricated final (and biggest) Canada Street span over State Highway 1

In 2005, the motorway off-ramp that made a connection from the CMJ to Auckland's Nelson Street was closed and replaced with an upgraded ramp. The old Nelson Street off-ramp was difficult to reach for drivers coming from the Auckland Southern Motorway, as they had to weave to the right within the CMJ. The new Nelson Street off-ramp was opened on 3 July 2005 and allowed for the principle of keeping left when leaving the motorway.

The concept of using the old off-ramp as a cycleway appears to first arise in the Central Motorway Junction Walking and Cycling Masterplan 2012 by the NZTA. Max Robitzsch, a transport engineer and member of Bike Auckland, is credited with helping turn this idea into reality, inspired by New York's High Line. In May 2014, he organised a walking tour on the off-ramp for members of Cycle Action Auckland and the Auckland Transport Blog, and followed up with a blog post in which he proposed to link the off-ramp to the road network south of the city centre via a ramp built from scaffolding with Karangahape Road. In a follow-up meeting with Transport Agency staff, the idea found their support.

When the National government announced a NZ$100 million package for cycling infrastructure in August 2014 during the campaign for the 2014 election, the Nelson Street Cycleway was added to the list of projects in January 2015 by the Minister of Transport, Simon Bridges. The partners in this project were the NZ Transport Agency, Auckland Transport, and Auckland Council. GHD and Novare Design were the designers of the Lightpath with Monk Mackenzie Architects responsible for the urban and architectural design components.

=== Canada Street bridge ===
A 160-metre-long (520 ft) bridge weighing 260 tonnes (260 long tons; 290 short tons) connects Canada Street to the former off-ramp. The bridge, designed by Novare Design was built in a workshop in Hamilton in eight sections and transported to Pukekohe for corrosion protection and painting. The southbound motorway lanes were closed overnight on seven occasions between 20 August and 10 September 2015 for preparations and to lift the bridge sections into place.

=== Opening of stage 1 ===
In a video released by the NZ Transport Agency before the opening of stage 1 of the project, the Nelson Street Cycleway was called "New Zealand's most ambitious piece of cycling infrastructure". The project was opened 3 December 2015 by Ernst Zöllner (Regional Director Auckland/Northland for the Transport Agency), transport minister Bridges, Chris Darby (elected member of Auckland Council), and Barbara Cuthbert (chair of Bike Auckland, recently renamed from Cycle Action Auckland).

=== Stage 2 ===
Stage 2 opened in December 2017 and extends along Nelson Street from Victoria Street West to Fanshaw Street, and then a short section down Market Place until Pakenham Street East intersection.

=== Stage 3 ===
The final stage is a bi-directional cycleway on Market Place, Customs Street West and then the western side of Lower Hobson Street; completing the city centre loop. Consultations were held in late 2017. This became part of Project WAVE (Westhaven And Viaduct Enhancements). A trial layout was installed in 2021, which led to the final design which completed in early 2023.

== Usage ==
After less than a year, path usage (cycle counts only, without pedestrians) was at approximately 750 per day.

Path usage across the first half of 2026 was at approximately 650 cyclists per day.

== Awards ==
The project (or parts of the project) have won several awards or been finalists in award competitions:

=== For Lightpath section (or overall project) ===
- Excellence Award (Category Best Public Works Project > $5M), New Zealand division of the Institute of Public Works Australasia
- Bike to the Future Awards 2016
  - Innovation Hub Award
  - Supreme Award
  - Big Bike Bling Award (As runner-up: "Highly Commended")
- Chicago Athenaeum Museum of Architecture and Design Award 2016
- Spatial Purple Pin Honour, Best New Zealand Design Awards
- World Architecture Festival 2016, Winner Completed Buildings Transport category

=== For Canada Street Bridge section ===
- Finalist at the World Architecture Festival in Singapore in November 2015, in the category 'Infrastructure – Future Projects'.

=== For project management ===
- Rodney Davies Project Award from the New Zealand Planning Institute (NZPI)
