= John Walker (runner) =

New Zealand middle-distance runner and politician

Sir John Walker KNZM CBE
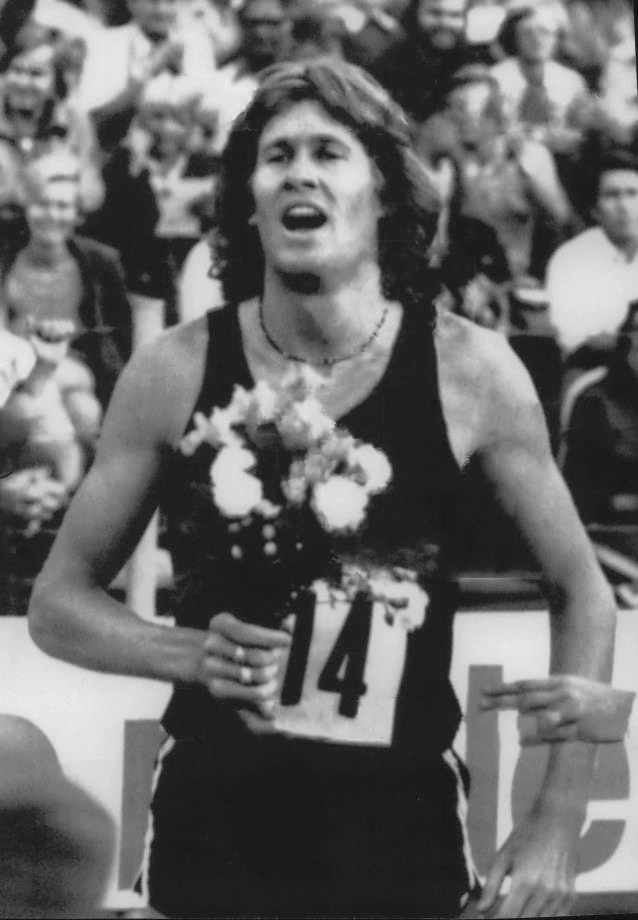
- Walker in 1975

Personal information
- Born: John George Walker; 12 January 1952 (age 74) Papakura, New Zealand
- Height: 183 cm (6 ft 0 in)
- Weight: 74 kg (163 lb)

Sport
- Country: New Zealand
- Sport: Athletics
- Event: 800–5000 m
- Coached by: Arch Jelley

Achievements and titles
- Personal bests: 800 m – 1:44.92 (1974); 1500 m – 3:32.4 (1975); Mile – 3:49.08 (1982); 5000 m – 13:19.28 (1986)
Medal record
Representing New Zealand
Olympic Games
| Gold medal – first place | 1976 Montreal | 1500 metres |
Commonwealth Games
| Silver medal – second place | 1974 Christchurch | 1500 metres |
| Silver medal – second place | 1982 Brisbane | 1500 metres |
| Bronze medal – third place | 1974 Christchurch | 800 metres |

Sir John George Walker (born 12 January 1952) is a former middle-distance runner from New Zealand who won the gold medal in the men's 1500 m event at the 1976 Olympics. He was also the first person to run the mile in under 3:50. After his running career was over he was active in local government, as an Auckland Councillor and representing the Manurewa-Papakura ward.

== 1974 Commonwealth Games ==
Walker achieved world prominence in 1974 when he finished second to Filbert Bayi of Tanzania in the 1500 metre run at the Commonwealth Games in Christchurch, New Zealand. In one of the greatest 1500 m races in history, Walker and Bayi both broke the existing world record, and others in the race recorded the fourth, fifth, and seventh fastest performances ever. Walker also took the bronze medal in the 800 metres in 1:44.92, his lifetime best for the distance; it still ranks him third-fastest New Zealander ever, behind James Preston and Peter Snell.

Throughout his career as a world-class miler, Walker was coached by Arch Jelley, a school principal and a middle distance runner himself, whose work with runners has been typified by meticulous training programmes on a scientific basis and effective communications in person.

== World record breaking runs ==
Walker broke the world record in the mile run with a time of 3:49.4 in Gothenburg, Sweden, on 12 August 1975, bettering the previous time of 3:51.0 set earlier that year by Filbert Bayi and becoming the first man to break 3:50.0 for the distance. Coincidentally, Walker's time was exactly 10 seconds faster than Roger Bannister's historic first sub-four-minute mile of 3:59.4, run twenty-one years previously. He was named Athlete of the Year by Track and Field News the same year. In the 1976 New Year Honours, Walker was appointed an Officer of the Order of the British Empire, for services to athletics, especially as the first person to run the mile in less than 3 minutes and 50 seconds.

Walker's new record lasted until 17 July 1979, when it was lowered by the Briton Sebastian Coe.

The following year, Walker broke the world record for the 2000 metres, running 4:51.4 in Oslo, Norway, on 30 June 1976. He smashed the ten-year-old existing record, held by Michel Jazy of France, by nearly five seconds. Walker regarded this run as the best race of his life. Steve Cram of Great Britain broke the record by one one-hundredth of a second on 4 August 1985, running 4:51.39 at Budapest, Hungary. Indoors, Walker broke the 1500 metre world record in 1979 with a time of 3:37.4.

== 1976 Montréal Olympic Games ==
In the 800 metres, Walker finished in 1:47.63, outside the two qualifying spots in his heat, and failed to advance to the semi-final round.

However, Walker was the favourite in the 1500 metres due to the African boycott of the Games, which deprived the event of several strong competitors including Tanzania's Filbert Bayi, his main rival. The 1500 metres final started at a slow pace, with a first 800 metres in 2:03. The race would come down to a fast finish. In a bid to outlast runners who were quicker over shorter distances, Walker started his finishing sprint 300 metres from the finish. He was fading in the last 20 metres but held off Ivo Van Damme of Belgium and Paul-Heinz Wellmann of West Germany to win the gold medal. It later emerged that Bayi likely would not have competed because of an attack of malaria.

In 1977, Walker saw his position as the world's top miler challenged by Steve Ovett of Great Britain, who beat him in the IAAF World Cup 1500 metres.

== New Zealand records ==
During 1981, Walker set a New Zealand all-comers' mile record of 3:50.6 in Auckland.

In 1982 in Oslo, Norway, Steve Scott (3:47.69), Walker (3:49.08), and Ray Flynn (3:49.77) took the top three spots in the Dream Mile, establishing American, New Zealand, and Irish national records for the mile in the same race. All three national records stood for 25 years until 21 July 2007, when Alan Webb broke Scott's American record. Walker and Flynn's times remain national records.

== Later career ==
At the 1982 Commonwealth Games in Brisbane, Walker took the silver medal in the 1500 metres behind Steve Cram of Great Britain. He moved up to the 5000 metres distance for both the 1984 Olympic Games and the 1986 Commonwealth Games with limited success. He raced at the 1990 Commonwealth Games, competing in both the 800 and 1500 metres; he was tripped early in the latter event but finished the race. The winner, Peter Elliott of Great Britain, persuaded Walker to accompany him on a lap of honor.

In 1985, Walker became the first man in history to run 100 sub-4 minute miles, achieving that feat just before his friend and rival Steve Scott of the United States. There was some controversy about this: Scott claimed that the two had agreed to reach 99 sub-4:00 miles apiece and then race each other, with the winner becoming the first to 100. Walker denied that such an agreement existed.

As his career wore on, leg injuries and stomach cramps started to affect his training. In the early 1990s he aimed to be the first runner over 40 years of age to run a mile under four minutes, but his attempts failed due to a leg injury. His rival Eamonn Coghlan became the first to achieve this, in 1993. At this point his international career had shown unusual longevity, spanning almost two decades. Walker ended his racing career with 135 sub-four-minute miles.

In 1990, Walker was awarded the New Zealand 1990 Commemoration Medal, and he was inducted into the New Zealand Sports Hall of Fame. In the 1992 Queen's Birthday Honours, he was promoted to Commander of the Order of the British Empire, for services to athletics, and in 1996, the International Olympic Committee awarded him the Olympic Bronze Order.

== After running ==
Auckland Council
| Years | Ward | Affiliation |
|---|---|---|
| 2010–2013 | Manurewa-Papakura | Independent |
| 2013–2016 | Manurewa-Papakura | Independent |
| 2016–2019 | Manurewa-Papakura | Independent |

In 1996, Walker announced that he was suffering from Parkinson's disease. He now operates an equestrian shop in Newmarket in Auckland with his wife, Helen. He was a Manukau City Councillor, and then a councillor for the merged Auckland Council. In 2016, Walker was reelected in the Manurewa-Papakura ward for a third consecutive term. He retired from public life at the 2019 local government elections.

Walker and his wife have four children.

In the 2009 Queen's Birthday Honours, Walker was appointed Knight Companion of the New Zealand Order of Merit, for services to sport and the community.

Records
| Preceded by (Tanzania) Filbert Bayi | Men's Mile World Record Holder; 12 August 1975 – 17 July 1979 | Succeeded by (United Kingdom) Sebastian Coe |
Awards and achievements
| Preceded by (United States) Rick Wohlhuter | Men's Track & Field Athlete of the Year; 1975 | Succeeded by (Cuba) Alberto Juantorena |
Awards
| Preceded by Dick Tayler | Lonsdale Cup of the New Zealand Olympic Committee; 1975 | Succeeded by Dick Quax |
