= Linda Cooper (politician) =

New Zealand politician

Linda Ann Cooper MNZM is a New Zealand politician who was a councillor on the Auckland Council from 2013 to 2022. In 2025 she was appointed a Member of the New Zealand Order of Merit, for services to the community.

== Political career ==
Auckland Council
Years	Ward	Affiliation
2013–2016	Waitākere	Independent
2016–2019	Waitākere	Independent
2019–2022	Waitākere	Independent

Cooper served on the Waitakere Community Board for 4 years and Waitakere City Council for 2 terms. She has been an elected member on the Waitākere Licensing Trust since 2001 and the President since 2010.

At the 2010 Auckland elections, Cooper stood for the Citizens & Ratepayers local-body ticket in the Albany ward. She finished sixth in the ward, and was not elected to the new Auckland Council.

At the 2011 general parliamentary election, Cooper stood as a list-only candidate for the New Zealand National Party. Ranked at number 74 in the list, she was not elected to parliament.

At the 2013 Auckland elections, Cooper was elected as a councillor for the Waitākere ward. She was one of two new centre-right candidates elected to the Auckland Council in 2013.

In 2015 Cooper made controversial remarks on the Auckland Pride Festival Facebook page while defending the attendance of National MPs who voted against gay marriage rights. Cooper referred to another user, as a "little boy" and a "judgmental little cock". A complaint was made with the Auckland Council, and Linda Cooper issued an apology and explained that her use of the word "cock" was to imply that the other user was being a "righteous rooster".

She was re-elected to council at the 2016 Auckland elections, and also re-elected to the Waitakere Licensing Trust. In 2017, Cooper announced she would seek selection as the National Party's candidate for Helensville at the 2017 general election; she did not win selection.

Cooper lost her seat on the Auckland Council in the 2022 local body elections.

In the 2025 New Year Honours Cooper was appointed a Member of the New Zealand Order of Merit, for services to the community.

Cooper is again running for the Auckland Council in the Waitākere ward in the 2025 elections.
