= Ann Hartley =

New Zealand politician (1942–2024)

Ann Hartley QSO
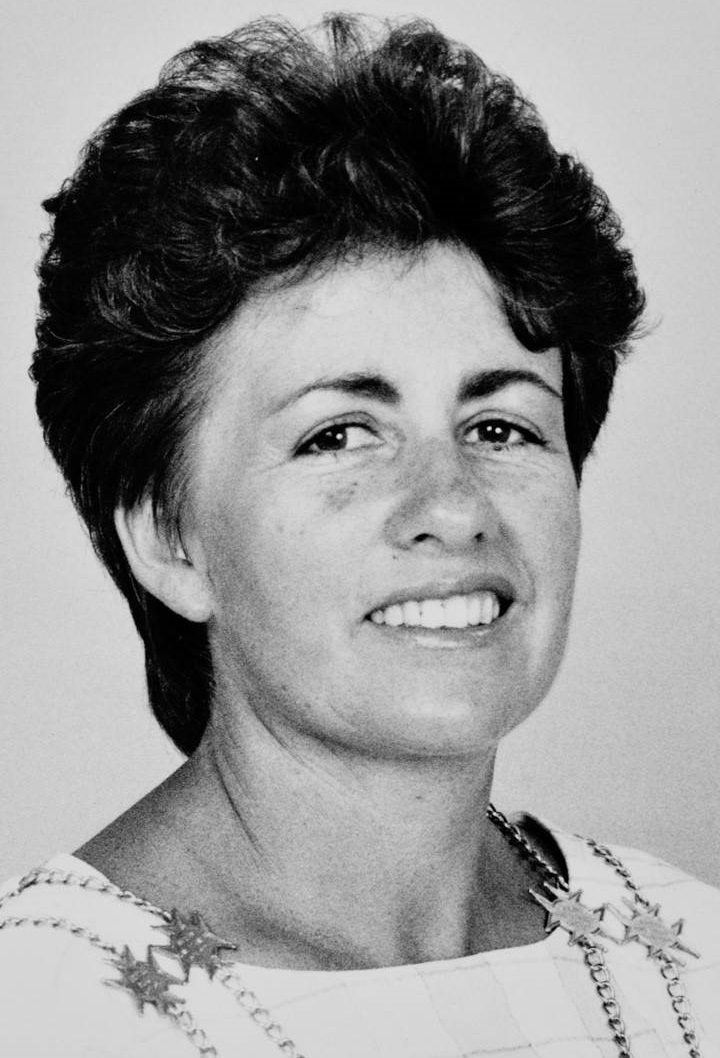
- Hartley, c. 1986–1989

Member of the Auckland Council for North Shore Ward
- In office 1 November 2010 – 12 October 2013 Serving with George Wood
- Preceded by: Office established
- Succeeded by: Chris Darby

Member of the New Zealand Parliament for Labour party list
- In office 17 September 2005 – 28 February 2008
- Succeeded by: Louisa Wall (Note: Normally, list MPs do not have individual predecessors or successors, but Hartley resigned during a sitting parliament and therefore was succeeded by Wall.)

Member of the New Zealand Parliament for Northcote
- In office 27 November 1999 – 17 September 2005
- Preceded by: Ian Revell
- Succeeded by: Jonathan Coleman

1st Mayor of North Shore City
- In office 14 October 1989 – 10 October 1992
- Succeeded by: Paul Titchener

2nd Mayor of Birkenhead City
- In office 1986–1989
- Preceded by: Graham Stott
- Succeeded by: Office abolished

Personal details
- Born: Margaret Ann Thompson; 23 September 1942 Warkworth, New Zealand
- Died: 20 December 2024 (aged 82) Auckland, New Zealand
- Party: Labour
- Spouse: Maurice Hartley (m. 1962; died 2022)
- Children: 2

Margaret Ann Hartley QSO (née Thompson; 23 September 1942 – 20 December 2024) was a New Zealand politician. She was a Labour member of parliament between 1999 and 2008, and served as the mayor of North Shore City from 1989 to 1992.

== Early life and education ==
Margaret Ann Thompson was born in Warkworth on 23 September 1942, the daughter of June Margaret and William Forsyth Thompson. She was educated at Orewa District High School from 1956 to 1960.

== Career ==
=== Early career ===
From 1966 to 1975, Hartley was a full-time mother. In the early 1980s, she worked for the Mental Health Foundation and later managed the Child Abuse Prevention Centre. From 1980 to 1986, she was a member of the Birkenhead City Council, a member of the Child Abuse Prevention Society from 1983 to 1986 and a member of the Auckland Education Board from 1984 to 1989. In the 1990s, she worked as a real estate agent.

=== Mayoralties ===
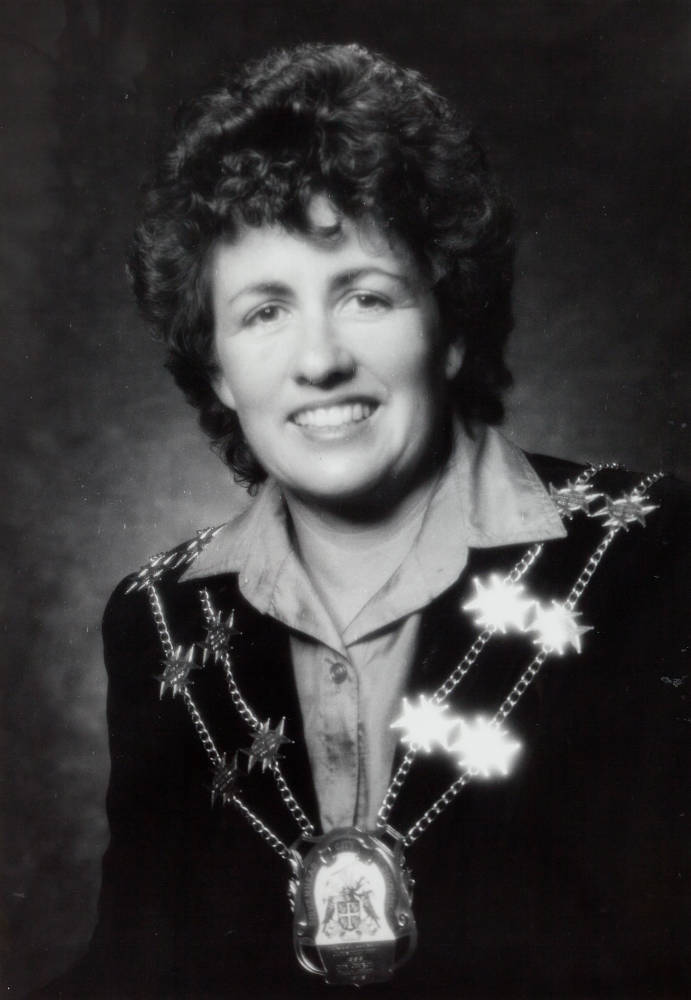
Hartley in 1987, as the mayor of Birkenhead

From 1986, Hartley was the mayor of Birkenhead City, which in 1989 was absorbed into the newly created North Shore City as part of the 1989 New Zealand local government reforms. Birkenhead along with several other councils attempted legal action in February 1989 to prevent the amalgamations, which they argued would not serve residents best interests. After a months long campaign attempting to convince more councils to join the action eventually they decided to drop the case after receiving legal advice. The amalgamation went through and Hartley was elected mayor of the new North Shore City. She was defeated after one term, but tried to win the role back in 1998. Her attempt was unsuccessful.

=== Member of Parliament ===
New Zealand Parliament
Years	Term	Electorate	List	Party
1999–2002	46th	Northcote	35	Labour
2002–2005	47th	Northcote	35	Labour
2005–2008	48th	List	30	Labour

She unsuccessfully contested the Birkenhead electorate in the 1993 election, coming second to National's Ian Revell. She unsuccessfully contested the Northcote electorate in the 1996 election, again coming second to Revell. As she was ranked 47th on Labour's party list in this first MMP election, she did not enter Parliament as a list MP either.

She was first elected to Parliament in the 1999 election, winning the Northcote electorate. She was re-elected for Northcote in 2002, but in 2005 was defeated by Jonathan Coleman. She remained in Parliament as a list member. In Parliament, she served on the Local Government and Environment Committee, Health Committee, and Justice and Electoral Committee, among others. With her prior experiences in local government, Hartley focused on legislative efforts including funding infrastructure improvements at a local level and early childhood education programs. As a member of the Health Committee, she was involved with the passage of legislation in 2003 for smoke-free environments in public places such as restaurants, while Steve Chadwick was chair of that committee. During her time on the Justice and Electoral Committee, she was involved in legislation related to victims' rights, as well as the Crimes (Substituted Section 59) Amendment Act 2007, which amended the Crimes Act 1961 to remove "reasonable force" as a legal defence for parents accused of assaulting their children.

Hartley served as the Deputy Speaker of the House in the 47th New Zealand Parliament and the Assistant Speaker from the 2005 general election until her retirement from national politics in February 2008. She was replaced by former environment minister Marian Hobbs as Assistant Speaker and by Louisa Wall as Labour list MP.

=== Later activities ===
Auckland Council
Years	Ward	Affiliation
2010–13	North Shore	Shore Voice

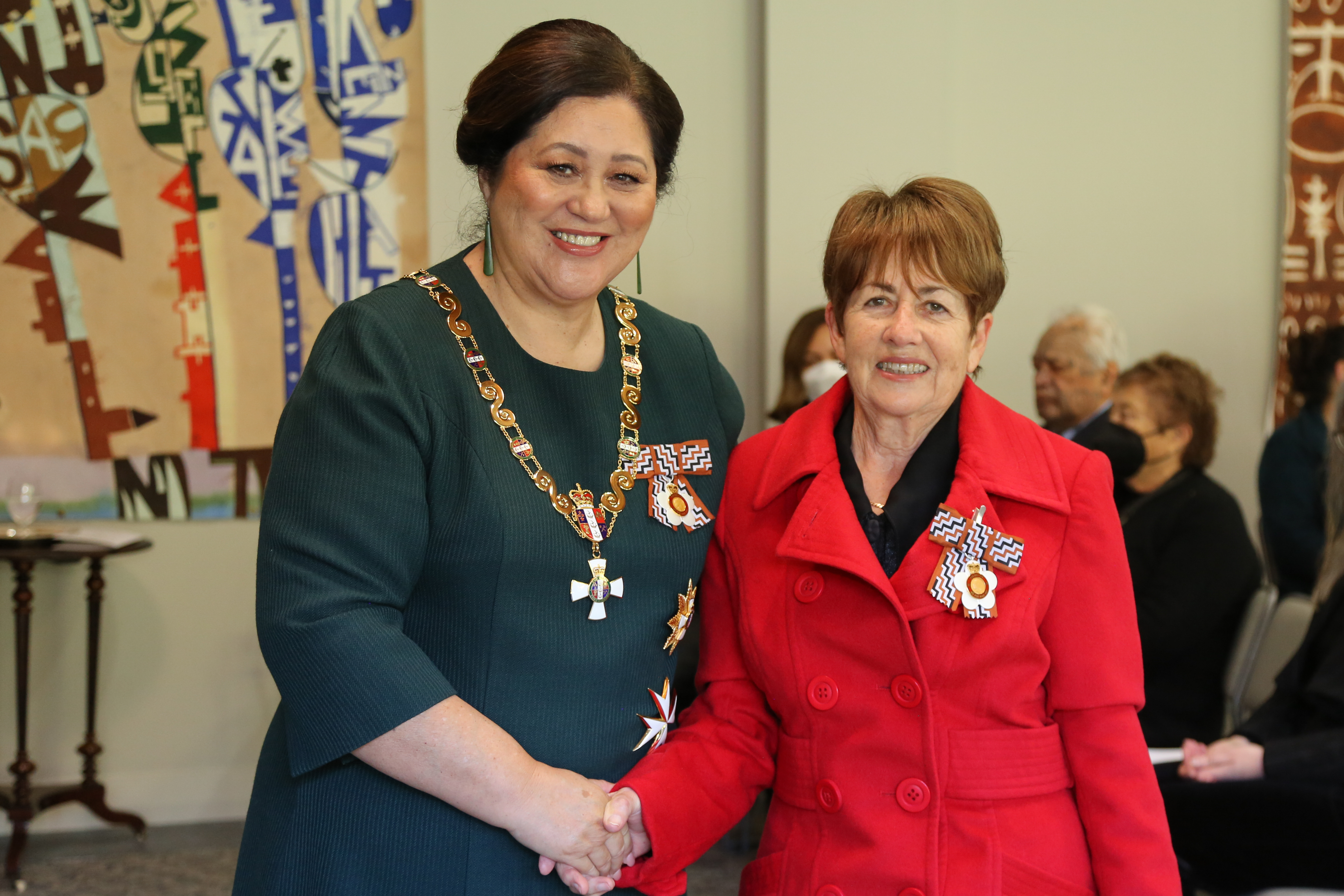
Hartley (right), after her investiture as a Companion of the Queen's Service Order by the governor-general, Dame Cindy Kiro, at Government House, Auckland, on 28 May 2022

In the 2007 local body elections Hartley was elected to the North Shore City Council, and left Parliament in 2008 after the summer recess.

At the 2010 local government elections, when the North Shore City Council (along with all the other councils in the Auckland region) was amalgamated into the single Auckland Council, she stood for the North Shore Ward under the Shore Voice ticket and was successful. She started her new role when the council came into existence on 1 November 2010. As part of the Auckland Council, she was involved with improving waterfront access in Takapuna and Mairangi Bay, by buying mansions that were converted into public parks. She played a role in improving public green spaces and events centres in the city, such as Kauri Point Centennial Park and the Bruce Mason Centre. Hartley was not re-elected at the 2013 Auckland Council election where she placed third running for re-election to one of the two seats in the North Shore Ward.

Hartley was elected to the Kaipātiki Local Board at the 2016 Auckland elections. She was reelected in 2019, and stepped down at the 2022 elections.

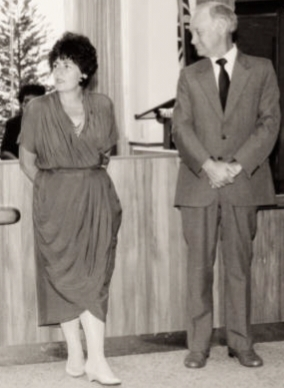
Hartley (left) in 1990, as the mayor of North Shore City

== Personal life and death ==
In about 1962, she married Maurice Hartley, and the couple went on to have two children. Maurice Hartley died in 2022.

Hartley died in Auckland on 20 December 2024, at the age of 82.

== Honours and awards ==
In 1990, Hartley was awarded the New Zealand 1990 Commemoration Medal. She was appointed a Companion of the Queen's Service Order in the 2022 New Year Honours for services to local government and the community.

== Notes ==
Political offices
Preceded by Graham Stott	Mayor of Birkenhead City; 1986–1989	Office abolished
New office	Mayor of North Shore City; 1989–1992	Succeeded by Paul Titchener
New Zealand Parliament
Preceded by Ian Revell	Member of Parliament for Northcote; 1999–2005	Succeeded by Jonathan Coleman
