= 2010 Auckland Council election =

- 9 October 2010
- Registered: 959,120
- Turnout: 489,059 (50.99%)
- Mayoral election
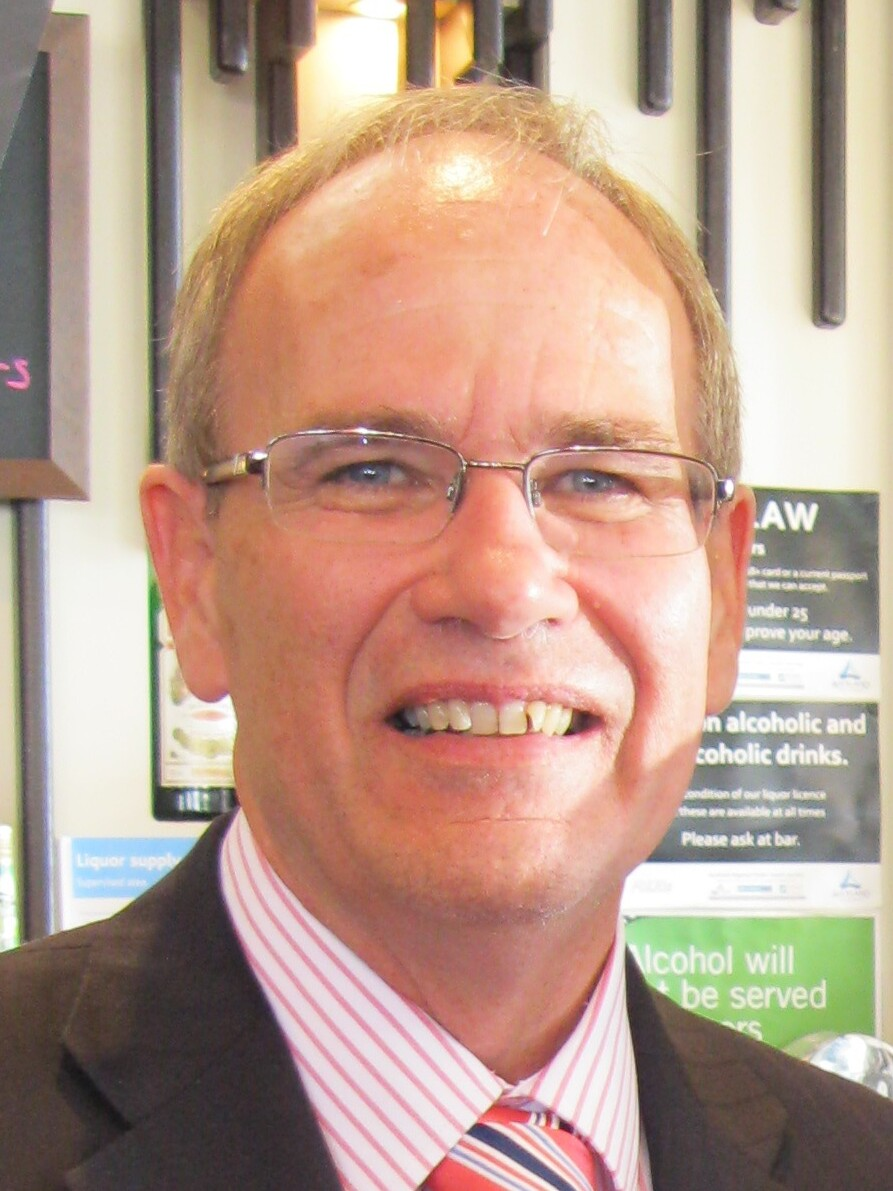

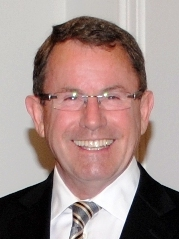

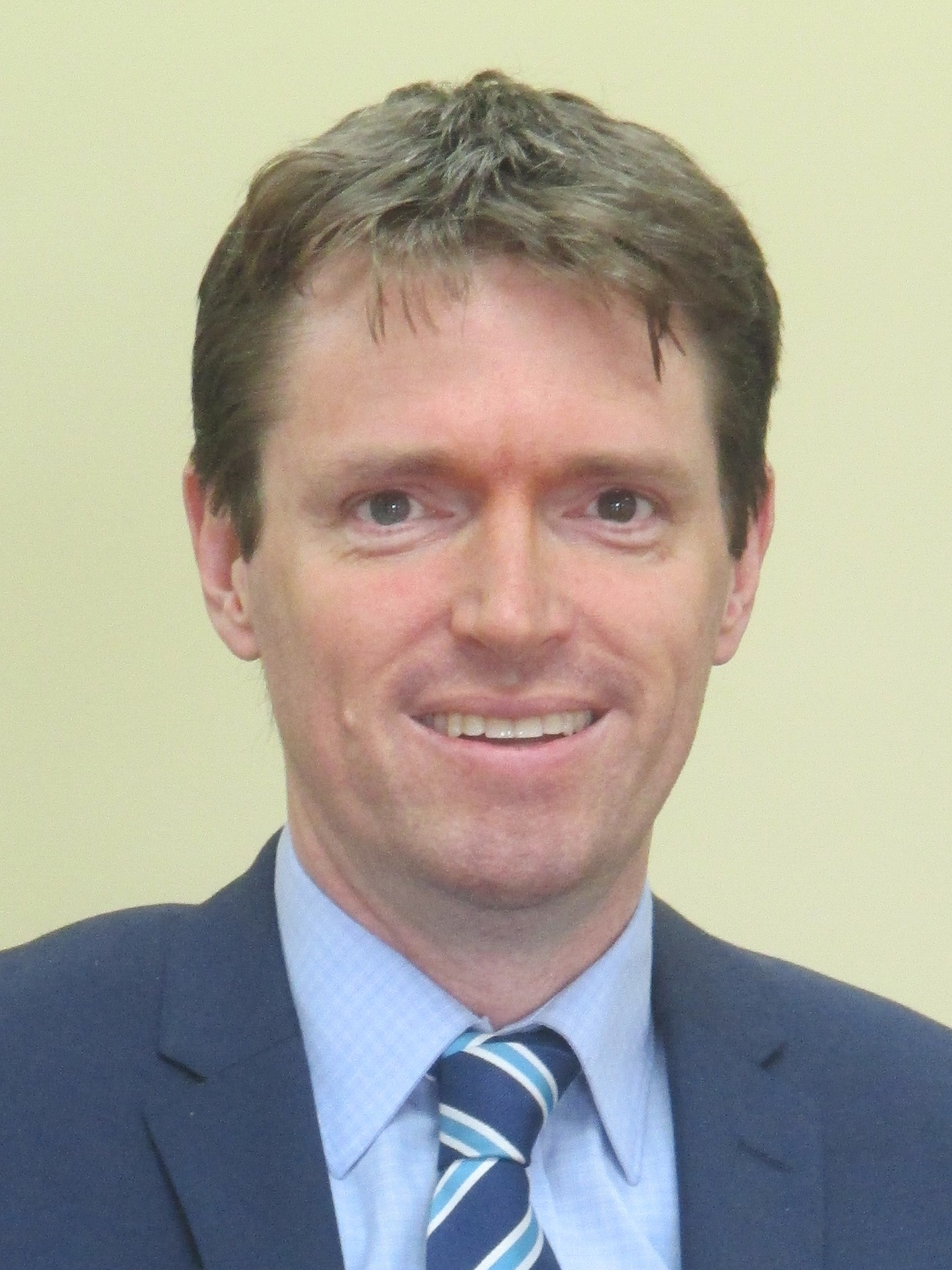
Candidate	Len Brown	John Banks	Colin Craig
Party	Independent	Independent	Independent
Popular vote	237,487	171,542	42,598
Percentage	49.24%	35.57%	8.83%
Elected mayor
Len Brown
Independent
- Council election
- 20 councillors on the Auckland Council; 11 seats needed for a majority
Party	Seats	+/–
Independent	8	+8
C&R	5	+5
Labour	2	+2
MPFA	1	+1
City Vision	1	+1
Shore Voice	1	+1
Best for the West	1	+1
Putting People First	1	+1
This lists parties that won seats. See the complete results below.

The 2010 Auckland Council election was a local election held from 17 September to 9 October in the Auckland region of New Zealand, as part of that year's territorial authority elections and other local elections held nation-wide.

Voters elected the mayor of Auckland, 20 councillors, 149 local board members (across 21 local boards), 21 district health board members, and 41 licensing trustees for the inaugural 2010–2013 term of the Auckland Council. Postal voting and the first-past-the-post voting system were used.

== Key dates ==
Key dates relating to the election included:

21 July	Notice of election issued
23 July	Nominations opened; electoral roll opened for inspection
20 August	Nominations closed
25 August	Candidates announced
17 September	Early voting starts, postal ballots arrive
9 October	Election day; voting closed 12:00 noon
15 October	Final result announced
16 October	Candidates take office at 00:00 midnight

== Results ==
=== 2010 Auckland mayoral election ===
Len Brown defeated second place John Banks.

=== Albany ward ===
Albany ward
Affiliation	Candidate	Vote	%
Independent	Michael Goudie	9,201	17.87
Putting People First	Wayne Walker	8,547	16.60
Proudly Independent	Julia Parfitt	7,434	14.44
Putting People First	John Watson	6,887	13.38
Proudly Independent	John Kirikiri	6,290	12.22
C&R	Linda Cooper	6,152	11.95
Shore Voice	Margaret Miles	6,120	11.89
Independent	Ian Bradley	5,579	10.84
C&R	Josephine Kim	5,570	10.82
Independent	Brian Neeson	4,911	9.54
Independent	Andrew Williams	4,668	9.07
Independent	Ross Craig	3,916	7.61
Independent	Rodney Bell	3,388	6.62
Independent	David Cooper	2,978	5.78
Independent	Alan McCulloch	2,851	5.54
Independent	Laurie Conder	1,499	2.91
Independent	Cameron Slater	1,298	2.52
Independent	David Willmott	1,221	2.37
Independent	Uzra Balouch	766	1.49
Informal		147	0.29
Blank		3255	6.32
Turnout		51,483	(52.36)
Registered		98,330	
Independent win (new council)			
Putting People First win (new council)			

=== Albert-Eden-Roskill ward ===
Albert-Eden-Roskill ward
Affiliation	Candidate	Vote	%
C&R	Christine Fletcher	20,777	38.88
City Vision	Cathy Casey	15,087	28.23
C&R	Paul Goldsmith	14,503	27.14
City Vision	Glenda Fryer	13,283	24.85
Independent	Ravi Musuku	6,837	12.79
Independent	Mark Donnelly	6,090	11.39
Independent	Peter Boys	4,375	8.19
Independent	Lisa Bates	4,037	7.55
Independent	Gary Russell	3,719	6.96
Independent	Harry Palmer	2,734	4.95
Independent	Susanna Kruger	2,670	5.00
Informal		94	0.18
Blank		4,013	7.51
Turnout		53,445	(51.01)
Registered		104,772	
C&R win (new council)			
City Vision win (new council)			

=== Franklin ward ===
Franklin ward
Affiliation	Candidate	Vote	%
C&R	Dee Morrison	10,651	46.32
Independent	Dianne Glenn	9,495	17.77
Independent	Herman Smeets	1,392	2.60
Informal		19	0.08
Blank		1,438	6.25
Turnout		22,995	(52.59)
Registered		43,725	
C&R win (new council)			

=== Howick ward ===
Howick ward
Affiliation	Candidate	Vote	%
Independent	Sharon Stewart	23,716	48.23
C&R	Jami-Lee Ross	19,289	39.23
C&R	Dick Quax	19,036	38.71
R&R	David Collings	11,590	23.57
Independent	Maggie Burrill	10,674	21.71
Independent	Mike Padfield	4,352	8.85
Informal		160	0.33
Blank		2,253	4.58
Turnout		49,171	(55.04)
Registered		89,338	
Independent win (new council)			
C&R win (new council)			

=== Manukau ward ===
Manukau ward
Affiliation	Candidate	Vote	%
Labour	Alf Filipaina	15,235	34.29
Independent	Arthur Anae	13,260	29.84
C&R	Bob Wichman	12,032	27.08
Labour	Efu Koka	11,287	25.40
Independent	Gary Troup	9,136	20.56
R&R	Sylvia Taylor	6,637	14.94
Independent	Brent Morrissey	3,565	8.02
A Better Choice	Rosie Brown	3,168	7.13
A Better Choice	Salote Lilo	3,088	6.95
Independent	Lupe Tofilau Alesana	2,330	5.24
Independent	Steven Afford	1,087	2.45
Communist League	Annalucia Vermunt	502	1.13
Informal		187	0.42
Blank		1,381	3.11
Turnout		44,431	(47.62)
Registered		93,305	
Labour win (new council)			
Independent win (new council)			

=== Manurewa-Papakura ward ===
Manurewa-Papakura ward
Affiliation	Candidate	Vote	%
Independent	John Walker	20,996	54.51
MPFA	Calum Penrose	17,266	44.82
R&R	Barry Curtis	16,597	43.09
Team South	Waina Emery	4,847	12.58
Team South	Toa Greening	4,018	10.43
A Better Choice	Sapa'u Vitale Vui	2,387	6.20
A Better Choice	Timothy Toilolo	2,056	5.34
Informal		61	0.16
Blank		1,341	3.48
Turnout		38,520	(47.72)
Registered		80,715	
Independent win (new council)			
MPFA win (new council)			

=== Maungakiekie-Tamaki ===
Maungakiekie-Tamaki ward
Affiliation	Candidate	Vote	%
Labour	Richard Northey	9,236	40.48
C&R	Alfred Ngaro	7,505	32.89
Independent	Simon Prast	3,409	14.94
Communist League	Patrick Brown	751	3.29
Independent	Walter Wi-Peri	286	9.01
Informal		55	0.24
Blank		1,504	6.59
Turnout		22,819	(48.25)
Registered		47,298	
Labour win (new council)			

=== North Shore ward ===
North Shore ward
Affiliation	Candidate	Vote	%
C&R	George Wood	14,902	29.53
Shore Voice	Ann Hartley	13,616	26.99
Independent	Grant Gillon	12,626	25.02
Independent	Christine Rankin	12,489	24.75
Independent	Joel Cayford	10,427	20.67
Shore Voice	Chris Darby	9,077	17.99
Independent	Vivienne Keohane	5,650	11.20
Independent	Jan O'Connor	3,458	6.85
Independent	Mary-Anne Benson-Cooper	2,709	5.37
Independent	Steve Ashby	2,647	5.25
Independent	Harry Fong	2,356	4.67
Independent	Ken McKay	1,905	3.78
Informal		115	0.23
Blank		2,173	4.31
Turnout		50,456	(50.92)
Registered		99,082	
C&R win (new council)			
Shore Voice win (new council)			

=== Orakei ward ===
Orakei ward
Affiliation	Candidate	Vote	%
Independent	Cameron Brewer	18,235	51.51
C&R	Doug Armstrong	11,101	31.36
Independent	Hugh Chapman	3,590	10.14
Informal		36	0.10
Blank		2,440	6.89
Turnout		35,402	(58.64)
Registered		60,369	
Independent win (new council)			

=== Rodney ward ===
Rodney ward
Affiliation	Candidate	Vote	%
Independent	Penny Webster	8,645	43.02
Independent	Christine Rose	5,960	29.66
Independent	Tom Ashton	4,204	20.92
Independent	Vincent Pereira	485	2.41
Informal		22	0.11
Blank		779	3.88
Turnout		20,095	(53.79)
Registered		37,359	
Independent win (new council)			

=== Waitakere ward ===
Waitakere ward
Affiliation	Candidate	Vote	%
Independent	Penny Hulse	18,125	37.45
Best for the West	Sandra Coney	13,451	27.79
Best for the West	Paul Walbran	11,400	23.56
C&R	Marie Hasler	10,584	21.87
C&R	Mark Brickell	10,491	21.68
Independent	Vanessa Neeson	9,609	19.85
Independent	Peter Chan	6,599	13.64
Independent	Cheryl Talamaivao	4,357	9.00
Independent	Bill Daly	2,305	4.76
Informal		74	0.15
Blank		2,494	5.15
Turnout		48,397	(47.40)
Registered		102,103	
Independent win (new council)			
Best for the West win (new council)			

=== Waitemata and Gulf ward ===
Waitemata and Gulf ward
Affiliation	Candidate	Vote	%
Independent	Mike Lee	11,436	42.74
Independent	Alex Swney	5,398	20.17
Independent	Tenby Powell	3,363	12.57
Independent	Rob Thomas	2,905	10.86
Independent	Janis Marler	850	3.18
Independent	Craig Thomas	619	2.31
Informal		53	0.20
Blank		2,134	7.98
Turnout		26,758	(50.79)
Registered		52,688	
Independent win (new council)			

=== Whau ward ===
Whau ward
Affiliation	Candidate	Vote	%
C&R	Noelene Raffills	7,518	30.80
Independent	Ross Clow	7,132	29.22
Independent	Jeremy Kirwan	3,934	16.12
Independent	Ruby Manukia-Schaumkel	3,288	13.47
Informal		74	0.30
Blank		2,466	10.10
Turnout		24,412	(48.79)
Registered		50,036	
C&R win (new council)			
