= 2016 Auckland Council election =

- 8 October 2016

All 20 seats of the Governing body of the Auckland Council
	First party	Second party
Party	Labour	C&R
Last election	2 seats, 9.54%	3 seats, 10.59%
Seats won	3	2
Seat change	▲1	▼1
Popular vote	63,258	44,250
Percentage	10.75	7.52
Swing	▲1.21%	▼3.07
	Third party	Fourth party
Party	Auckland Future	City Vision
Last election	(new)	1 seat, 5.92%
Seats won	1	1
Seat change	▲1	0
Popular vote	76,342	26,725
Percentage	12.97	4.96
Swing	▲12.97%	▼0.96%

The 2016 Auckland Council election took place between September and October 2016 by postal vote. The elections were the third since the merger of seven councils into the Auckland Council, which is composed of the mayor and 20 councillors, and 149 members of 21 local boards. Twenty-one district health board members and 41 licensing trust members were also elected.

== Mayoral election ==
Incumbent Len Brown, the only Mayor of Auckland since the position was created, did not contest the mayoralty.

New Zealand Labour Party MP for Mount Roskill Phil Goff was elected mayor of Auckland.

== Governing body elections ==
20 members were elected to the Auckland Council, across thirteen wards. There were 74 nominations and only one of the 13 wards was uncontested.

=== Rodney (1) ===
The incumbent was Penny Webster. She was defeated by Greg Sayers.

Affiliation (if any)	Name	Votes
Independent	Greg Sayers	9,252
Independent	Penny Webster	6,073
Independent	Steven Garner	1,898
none	Holly Southernwood	1,342
	Informal/blank	1,083

=== Albany (2) ===
The incumbents Wayne Walker and John Watson were both elected to council for another term.

Affiliation (if any)	Name	Votes
Putting People First	John Watson	19,324
Putting People First	Wayne Walker	17,938
Auckland Future	Lisa Whyte	15,926
Auckland Future	Graham Lowe	15,549
Independent	John Bensch	5,126
Independent	Alezix Heneti	1,538
	Informal/blank	3,926

=== North Shore (2) ===
The incumbents were Chris Darby and George Wood. Wood did not contest the ward in 2016. Darby was reelected as councillor. The second councillor elected was Richard Hills, although as preliminary results were extremely close between himself and next rival Grant Gillon, he was not confirmed until after the final results were announced.

Affiliation (if any)	Name	Votes
Taking the Shore Forward	Chris Darby	19,396
A Positive Voice for the Shore	Richard Hills	12,651
Shore Action	Grant Gillon	12,523
Auckland Future	Danielle Grant	6,415
Shore Action	Anne-Elise Smithson	5,967
Auckland Future	Fay Freeman	5,308
Independent	Mary-Anne Benson-Cooper	2,706
Independent	John Hill	2,363
Independent	Lesley Kahn	2,133
United Future	Damian Light	1,437
Independent	Michael Buttle	940
Independent	Tate Robertson	739
	Informal/blank	2,728

=== Waitakere (2) ===
The incumbents deputy mayor Penny Hulse and Linda Cooper were both re-elected.

Affiliation (if any)	Name	Votes
Independent/West at Heart	Penny Hulse	19,935
Independent	Linda Cooper	12,442
Labour/Future West	Greg Presland	11,744
Independent	Peter Chan	7,427
WestWards	Ken Turner	5,129
Independent	David Rankin	4,520
Independent	John Riddell	3,230
Independent	Rochelle Gormly	2,588
United Future	JB Woolston	1,779
	Informal/blank	1,871

=== Waitemata and Gulf (1) ===
The incumbent Mike Lee was re-elected ahead of media personality Bill Ralston.

Affiliation (if any)	Name	Votes
none	Mike Lee	9,424
Independent	Bill Ralston	8,341
Independent	Rob Thomas	4,475
	Informal/blank	2,271

=== Whau (1) ===
The incumbent Ross Clow was reelected.

Affiliation (if any)	Name	Votes
Labour	Ross Clow	6,895
Community First	Duncan MacDonald	3,563
Auckland Future	Mark Brickell	2,929
Independent	Anne Degia-Pala	2,106
Shadbolt's Independent	Wayne Davis	1,195
United Future	John Hubscher	619
	Informal/blank	1,795

=== Albert-Eden-Roskill (2) ===
The incumbents Christine Fletcher and Cathy Casey were both reelected.

Affiliation (if any)	Name	Votes
City Vision	Cathy Casey	19,256
Communities and Residents	Christine Fletcher	16,925
Auckland Future	Rob Harris	10,000
City Vision	Peter Haynes	9,935
Communities and Residents	Benjamin Lee	9,070
Independent	Greg McKeown	8,472
Independent	Boris Sokratov	2,879
none	Bridgette Sullivan-Taylor	1,177
	Informal/blank	3,945

=== Maungakiekie-Tamaki (1) ===
The incumbent Denise Krum was re-elected after switching from Communities and Residents to Auckland Future; at the same time, she reverted to her maiden name Denise Lee. Auckland Future mistakenly entered two candidates to contest the ward. While they could not remove Tiseli from the ballot, Auckland Future were able to remove their affiliation from his candidacy.

Affiliation (if any)	Name	Votes
Auckland Future	Denise Lee	9,361
Labour	Patrick Cummuskey	4,920
none	Viliami Teli Tiseli	1,748
	Informal/blank	1,345

=== Manukau (2) ===
The incumbents were Alf Filipaina and Arthur Anae. Anae did not contest the ward in 2016. Filipaina was reelected and joined by new councillor Efeso Collins.

Affiliation (if any)	Name	Votes
Labour	Alf Filipaina	17,327
Labour	Efeso Collins	16,500
Respect Our Community Campaign	Brendan Corbett	7,738
Auckland Future	Sooalo Setu Mua	5,550
Auckland Future	Ika Tameifuna	5,304
	Informal/blank	2,388

=== Manurewa-Papakura (2) ===
The incumbents were John Walker and Calum Penrose. Walker was reelected however Penrose was ousted by Daniel Newman, the only candidate not already a councillor.

Affiliation (if any)	Name	Votes
Manurewa-Papakura Action Team	Daniel Newman	15,423
Independent	John Walker	14,794
Independent	Calum Penrose	13,790
	Informal/blank	1,431

=== Franklin (1) ===
The incumbent, Bill Cashmore, was the only candidate and so was declared elected unopposed.

Affiliation (if any)	Name
Team Franklin	Bill Cashmore

=== Ōrākei (1) ===
The incumbent, Cameron Brewer, was elected unopposed in 2013 but did not contest the ward in 2016. Desley Simpson was comfortably elected.

Affiliation (if any)	Name	Votes
Communities and Residents	Desley Simpson	18,255
Green Party	Richard Leckinger	4,313
Community Voice	Mike Padfield	3,414
none	Ian Wilson	996
	Informal/blank	3,269

=== Howick (2) ===
The incumbents, Dick Quax and Sharon Stewart, were elected unopposed in 2013. Despite eight other candidates contesting the ward in 2016, both were reelected.

Affiliation (if any)	Name	Votes
Independent	Sharon Stewart	17,923
Independent	Dick Quax	15,516
Independent	Paul Young	7,046
Independent	David Hay	5,757
Green Party	Julie Zhu	5,732
none	Matthew Cross	5,034
none	Olivia Montgomery	4,409
Labour	Gyanandra Kumar	3,129
Labour	Tofik Mamedov	2,743
none	Ian Colin Ireland	1,120
	Informal/blank	2,042

== Licensing Trust elections ==
35 Members were elected to 5 licensing trusts across Auckland.

=== Birkenhead Licensing Trust (6) ===
Affiliation (if any)	Name	Votes
Shore Action	Paula Gillon	5,012
Kaipātiki Voice	Scott Espie	4,523
Independent	Bill Plunkett	4,184
Independent	Marilyn Nicholls	4,088
	Shane Prince	3,824
	Stuart Wier	3,357
	Kevin OGrady	2,963
Independent	Gareth Teahan	2,026

=== Mt Wellington Licensing Trust (6) ===
Affiliation (if any)	Name	Votes
Labour	Mark Gosche	3,959
Labour	Alan Verrall	3,733
Labour	Nerissa Henry	3,718
Labour	Maureen Benson-Rea	3,553
Labour	Jean Dolheguy	3,208
Independent	Leanne Cross	2,973
Independent	Leon Matthews	2,623
Independent	Bryan Mockridge	2,358
Independent	Patrick O'Meara	2,195

=== Portage Licensing Trust ===
==== Ward No 1 – Auckland City (3) ====
Affiliation (if any)	Name	Votes
City Vision	Catherine Farmer	5484
Community First	Paul Davie	4787
City Vision	Margi Watson	4714
Community First	Kathryn Davie	4704
City Vision	Jaclyn Bonnici	4615
Community First	Alan Thompson	3741

==== Ward No 2 – New Lynn (2) ====
Affiliation (if any)	Name	Votes
Labour	Leanne Taylor	1685
Labour	Clear Matafai	1229
Independent	Sandy Taylor	1205
Shadbolt's Independent	Davis Wayne	981
United Future	John Hubscher	656
Community First	Tam Canter-Visscher	555

==== Ward No 3 – Glen Eden (2) ====
Affiliation (if any)	Name	Votes
Future West	Neil Henderson	1834
Independent	Janet Clews	1834
Independent	Stefanie O'Brien	1109
	Alan Mcardle	676

==== Ward No 4 – Titirangi / Green Bay (2) ====
Affiliation (if any)	Name	Votes
Future West	Sandra Coney	4496
Independent	Ross Clow	3786
Independent	Ngarimu Blair	2045
	JB Woolston	1963

==== Ward No 5 – Kelston West (1) ====
Affiliation (if any)	Name	Votes
Labour	Ami Chand	Elected Unopposed

=== Waitakere Licensing Trust ===
==== Ward No 1 – Te Atatū (2) ====
Affiliation (if any)	Name	Votes
Independent – West at Heart	Penny Hulse	5140
Labour	Shane Henderson	3705
Independent	Jack Burton	2690
Green Party	Francisco Hernandez	1862

==== Ward No 2 –Lincoln (3) ====
Affiliation (if any)	Name	Votes
Independent	Linda Cooper	7744
Independent	Warren William Flaunty	5906
Independent	John Riddell	4245
Independent	Deborah Dougherty	3972
Independent	John Carrodus	3783
Independent	Mahendra Sharma	1787

==== Ward No 3 – Waitakere (1) ====
Affiliation (if any)	Name	Votes
Future West	Steve Tollestrup	2091
Independent	Judy Lawley	1481
Independent	Tracy Kirkley	1213
Regulate Cannabis Like Alcohol	Chris Fowlie	732

==== Ward No 4 – Henderson (1) ====
Affiliation (if any)	Name	Votes
Independent	Lynette Adams	2862
Independent	Mike Jolley	2468

=== Wiri Licensing Trust (6) ===
Affiliation (if any)	Name	Votes
Manurewa Action Team	Grant Dalton	7702
Manurewa Action Team	Alan Johnson	7249
Manurewa Action Team	Rangi Mclean	7053
Manurewa Action Team	Stella Cattle	7030
Manurewa Action Team	Duncan White	6430
Manurewa Action Team	Denis Kim	6163
Independent	John Hall	5096
It's Worth It Manurewa	Tanya Kaihe	4816
