= Cheryl Talamaivao =

New Zealand social worker and trade unionist

Cheryl Talamaivao KSM JP
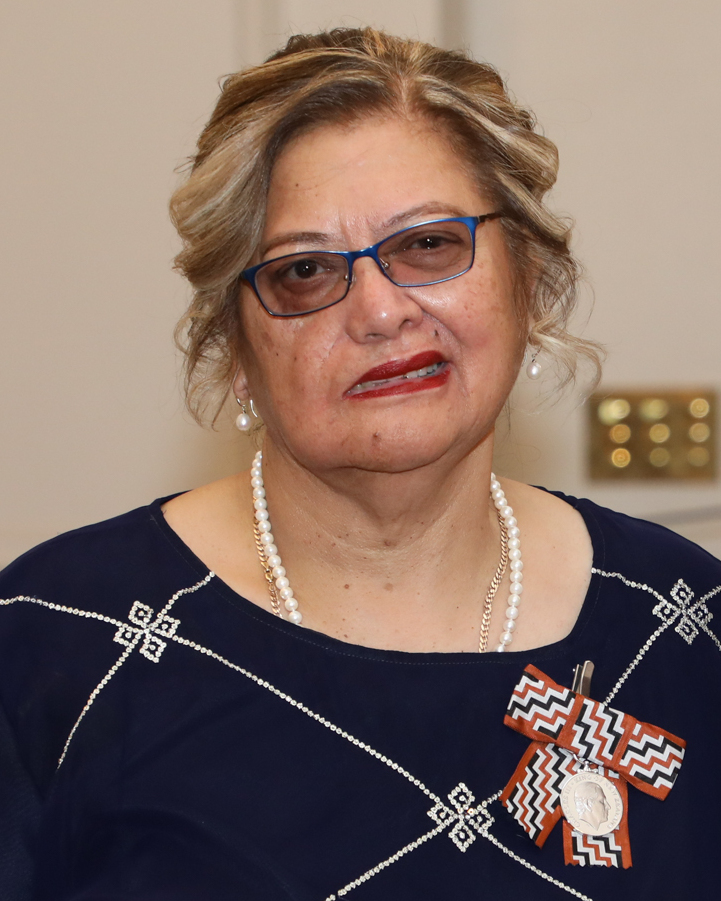
- Talamaivao in 2026
- Born: Auckland, New Zealand
- Occupations: Social worker; activist; trade unionist

Sailauama Cheryl Talamaivao is a New Zealand social worker, activist, and trade union leader.

== Biography ==
Talamaivao was born in Auckland to Samoan parents who had migrated there in the 1950s.

Talamaivao is trained and licensed as a social worker. Over the course of her career, she has worked to connect Pasifika New Zealanders with social services. In 2008, Talamaivao co-founded the Waitakere Pacific Wardens Trust, which engages Pasifika people with issues of health and safety. She went on to chair the organisation from 2017 to 2023.

She also became heavily involved in the New Zealand trade union movement. From 1997 to 2004, she served as vice president of the Public Service Association, the country's largest public-sector union.

In 2008, she was appointed as a justice of the peace. She then ran unsuccessfully for a seat on the Auckland Council in 2010. One of her goals in running had been to better represent minority groups on the council.

As of 2026, Talamaivao is a senior lecturer at in the School of Healthcare and Social Practice at Unitec Institute of Technology.

In the 2026 New Year Honours, Talamaivao was awarded the King's Service Medal, for services to the Pacific community and education. She was one of eight Pasifika people recognised in that honours list.
