= Chris Darby =

Auckland Councillor

Councillor Chris Darby
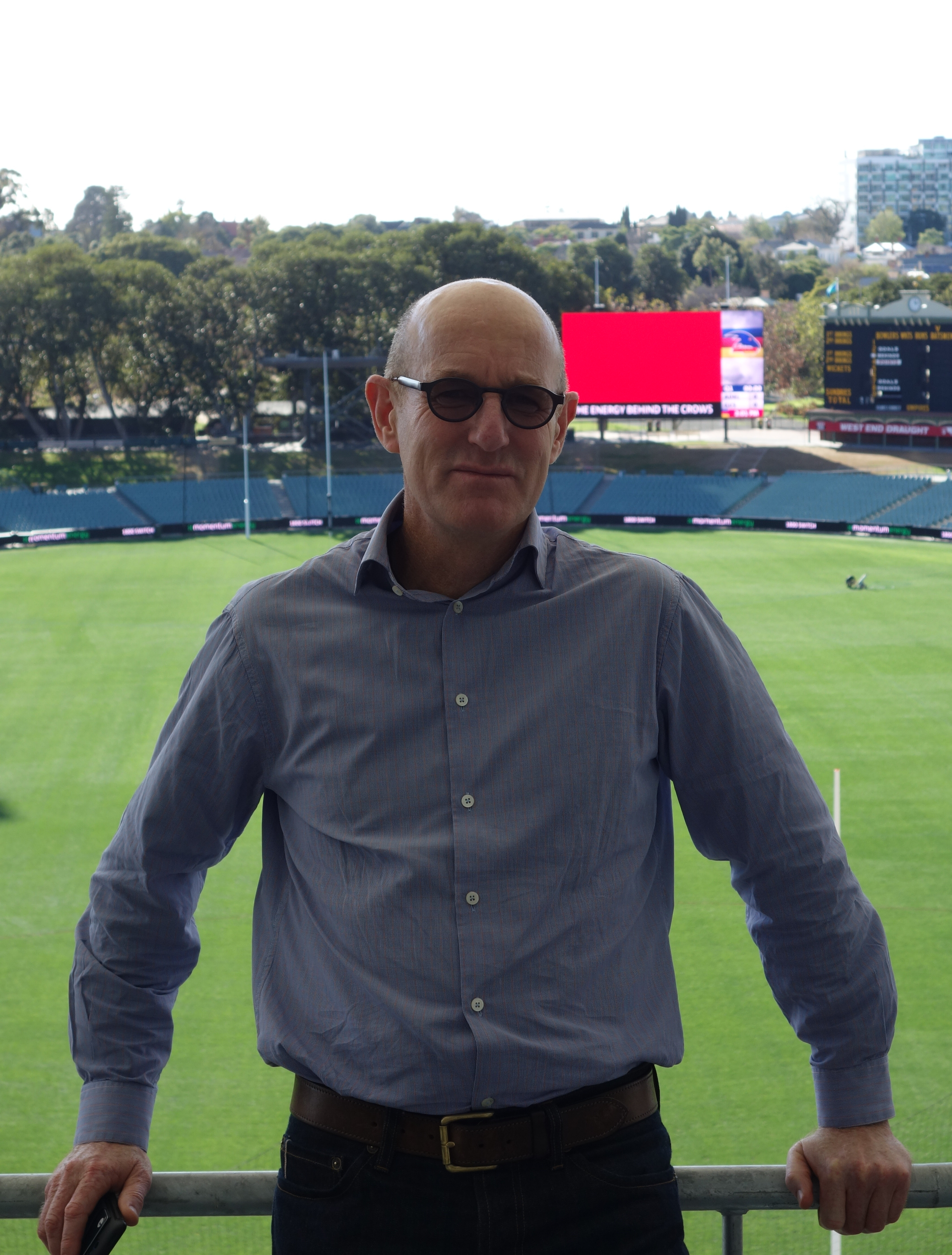
- Darby in 2014

North Shore Ward Councillor
- Incumbent
- Assumed office 2013 Serving with Richard Hills
- Preceded by: Ann Hartley

Chris Darby is an Auckland Councillor for the North Shore Ward. He is focused on public transport, urban regeneration and environmental issues. He is an independent who is not affiliated to any political party. Darby ran on his own ticket at the 2013, 2016, 2019, and 2022 Auckland Council elections, and was elected each time. Darby is not standing for re-election in 2025.

== Early political involvement ==
As a young man, Darby supported Ngāti Whātua's occupation of Bastion Point and was there on the day of the eviction on 25 May 1978. Before the "super city" merger of Auckland's councils into Auckland Council in 2010, Darby served on the North Shore City Council, being first elected in 2004.

== Auckland Council ==
Auckland Council
Years	Ward	Affiliation
2013–2016	North Shore	Taking the Shore Forward
2016–2019	North Shore	Taking the Shore Forward
2019–2022	North Shore	Taking the Shore Forward
2022–present	North Shore	For the Shore

At the 2010 Auckland Council election, Darby ran for the North Shore ward of Auckland Council for Shore Voice alongside Ann Hartley, who was elected. Darby finished 6th and was not elected to the council, but was elected to the Devonport-Takapuna Local Board for the 2010–2013 term.

At the 2013 Auckland Council election, Darby ran for Council again and was elected as a Councillor for the North Shore ward, polling higher than both incumbents, George Wood and Ann Hartley. Wood remained Co-Councillor with Darby, given the North Shore ward elects two Councillors, however Hartley lost her seat to Darby, with whom she had campaigned on the Shore Voice ticket in 2010. Darby served his first term on the council with George Wood.

In the 2013–16 Auckland Council he was the Deputy Chair of the Auckland Development Committee and Infrastructure Committee, and is council's Political Urban Design Champion.

Darby was re-elected at the 2016 Auckland Council election, with Richard Hills elected to serve with Darby. The new mayor, Phil Goff, appointed Darby the Chairperson of the Planning Committee. At both the 2019 and 2022 elections, Darby and Hills were re-elected.

Darby chose not to seek re-election at the 2025 Auckland Council election, although he has not stated whether he would seek to remain on the board of Auckland Transport.
