= Grant Gillon =

New Zealand politician

9th Leader of the Democratic Party
- In office 24 November 2001 – 13 October 2002
- Preceded by: John Wright
- Succeeded by: Stephnie de Ruyter

Member of the New Zealand House of Representatives
- In office 12 October 1996 – 27 July 2002

Personal details
- Party: Alliance Government; Shore Action Local Body
- Children: John Gillon; Paula Gillon

Grant Gillon is a former New Zealand politician. He was a member of parliament between 1996 and 2002, representing the Alliance Party, and has held a number of seats in local government. He previously served on the Devonport-Takapuna Local Board representing Shore Action.

He is a former senior lecturer in paramedicine and emergency management at the Auckland University of Technology.

== Political career ==
New Zealand Parliament
Years	Term	Electorate	List	Party
1996–1999	45th	List	11	Alliance
1999–2002	46th	List	7	Alliance

Gillon's political career began when he joined the Democratic Party. In 1991, the Democratic Party joined the Alliance as one of the four founding parties. In the 1993 election, Gillon stood in the Glenfield electorate and came third.

Gillon was elected to Parliament as an Alliance list MP in the 1996 election, having been ranked in eleventh place on the party list. He was re-elected to Parliament in the 1999 election. While an MP, Gillon was a Government Whip, Deputy Chair of the Government Administration Select Committee, member of the MMP Review Committee, member of the Privileges, Officers of Parliament, Standing Orders, Members' Services, Business, Parliamentary Services, Legislative, Cabinet, and other parliamentary committees.

In 2001, Gillon became leader of the Democratic Party, replacing John Wright.

When the Alliance collapsed in 2002, Gillon and the Democratic Party joined Jim Anderton's breakaway party, the Progressive Coalition. In the 2002 election, Gillon was ranked third on the Progressive Coalition list, behind Jim Anderton and Matt Robson. Gillon resigned as leader and left the party altogether and moved to the Progressive Coalition after the Democratic Party members voted to leave the Progressive Coalition. Gillon became President of the Progressive Coalition until he stood down in 2007.

He has served as the North Shore City Councillor (representing the Harbour Ward and Chair of the Strategy and Finance Committee) and Birkenhead/Northcote Community Board member, elected to both the City Council and Community Board.

Gillon is a past chief executive officer for the ISEA union for teachers and a past member of the board of directors of the state-owned enterprise AsureQuality.

Gillon has also worked as a dairy farmer, senior fire officer, and an entrepreneur in light manufacturing, printing, educational resource and publishing. As of 2017 he managed the Esplanade Hotel on Auckland's North Shore.

During the 2016 Auckland elections, Gillon ran for the North Shore ward of the Auckland Council and missed out on a seat by 128 votes. He was re-elected to the Devonport-Takapuna Local Board as its chair.

He tried to win the election to the Auckland Council under the More for the Shore banner in the 2019 local body elections but was unsuccessful, being defeated by the two incumbent councillors.

== Publishing ==
Gillon's published works include:

- United to Protect: An Historical Account of the Auckland Fire Brigade, 1848–1985
- Where There's Smoke, an exposé of insurance evasion in relation to The Fire Service

He has also contributed chapters to other works, including:

- New Zealand Government and Politics, chapters with Ray Miller on the role of an MP
- The Baubles of Office: The New Zealand General Election of 2005, a chapter on The Progressives

== Personal ==
Gillon and his family have been long-term residents of the North Shore. Gillon also performs community work and previously a trustee of the Birkenhead Licensing Trust, Northart, Birkenhead-Northcote Glenfield Community Trust and other community organisations.

His daughter, Paula, is also active in Auckland local body politics; having been elected in 2001 to the North Shore City Council two weeks after reaching the required age of eighteen. Paula currently serves on the Kaipatiki Local Board and the Birkenhead Licensing Trust. Grant Gillon's eldest son, John, serves as Chair of the Kaipatiki Local Board.

Gillon has a master's degree in Public Policy, and a PhD in Public Policy from Massey University. Along with Marilyn Waring, he supervised former minister George Gair's master's thesis at Auckland University of Technology in 2010.

Party political offices
Preceded by John Wright	Leader of the Democratic Party; 2001–2002	Succeeded by Stephnie de Ruyter
