= 2025 Auckland Council election =

- 11 October 2025
- Turnout: 350,153 (29.04% ▼6.37 pp)
- Mayor
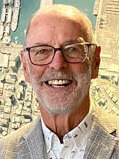

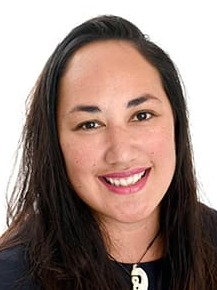

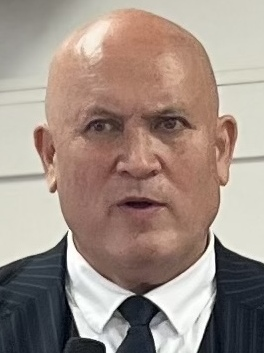
Candidate	Wayne Brown	Kerrin Leoni	Ted Johnston
Party	Fix Auckland	Independent	Independent
Popular vote	180,130	77,577	27,035
Percentage	51.44%	22.16%	7.72%
Mayor before election
Wayne Brown
Independent
Elected mayor
Wayne Brown
Fix Auckland
- Councillors
- 20 councillors on the governing body of Auckland Council; 11 seats needed for a majority
Party	Seats	+/–
Independent	6	−1
Labour	5	0
Fix Auckland	2	+2
MPAT	2	+1
City Vision	1	0
WestWards	1	0
Team Franklin	1	0
Putting People First	1	−1
C&R	1	−1
This lists parties that won seats. See the complete results below.
IND hold	LAB hold	–	MPAT hold
IND gain	–	FIX gain	MPAT gain
CV hold	PPF hold	C&R hold	WW hold
TF hold	–	–	–
Control before	Control after
No majority	No majority

The 2025 Auckland Council election was a local election held from 9 September to 11 October in the Auckland region of New Zealand, as part of that year's territorial authority elections and other local elections held nation-wide.

Voters elected the mayor of Auckland, 20 councillors and 151 local board members (across 21 local boards) for the 2025–2028 term of the Auckland Council. Postal voting and the first-past-the-post voting system were used.

Incumbent mayor Wayne Brown won re-election to a second term.

== Key dates ==
- 4 July 2025: Nominations for candidates opened
- 1 August 2025: Nominations for candidates closed at 12 pm
- 9 September 2025: Voting documents were posted and voting opened
- 11 October 2025: Voting closed at 12 pm and progress/preliminary results will be published
- 16–19 October 2025: Final results will be declared.

== Background ==
=== Positions up for election ===
Voters in Auckland elected 20 councillors from 13 wards, as well as the mayor of Auckland. They also elected 151 members from 21 local boards and 35 trustees across 5 licensing trusts (Birkenhead, Mount Wellington, Portage, Waitākere, and Wiri Licensing Trust).

=== Representation ===
==== Local boards ====
These were the first Auckland local elections since the 2024 Representation Review, which increased the number of local board members from 149 to 151, with the Howick Local Board gaining an additional 2 members for a total of 11.

=== Pre-election report ===
The growth of Auckland was brought up in the pre-election report; the city now comprised over 1.8 million people (more than one third of the entire country) and contributed 40% of the country's GDP. The population was expected to grow by 520,000 in the next three decades. Low productivity was another challenge identified in the pre-election report.

The report noted that the council needed to invest $295 billion in the city's infrastructure. The State of Auckland Report (commissioned by the Committee for Auckland) ranked the city 99th against other peer cities globally in terms of productivity.

Auckland was vulnerable to extreme weather including flooding and sea level rise, according to the pre-election report.

=== Central government tensions ===
There were tensions between the council and central government during the 2022–2025 term, with mayor Brown saying that central government needed to be more collaborative with council when making decisions that would impact the city.

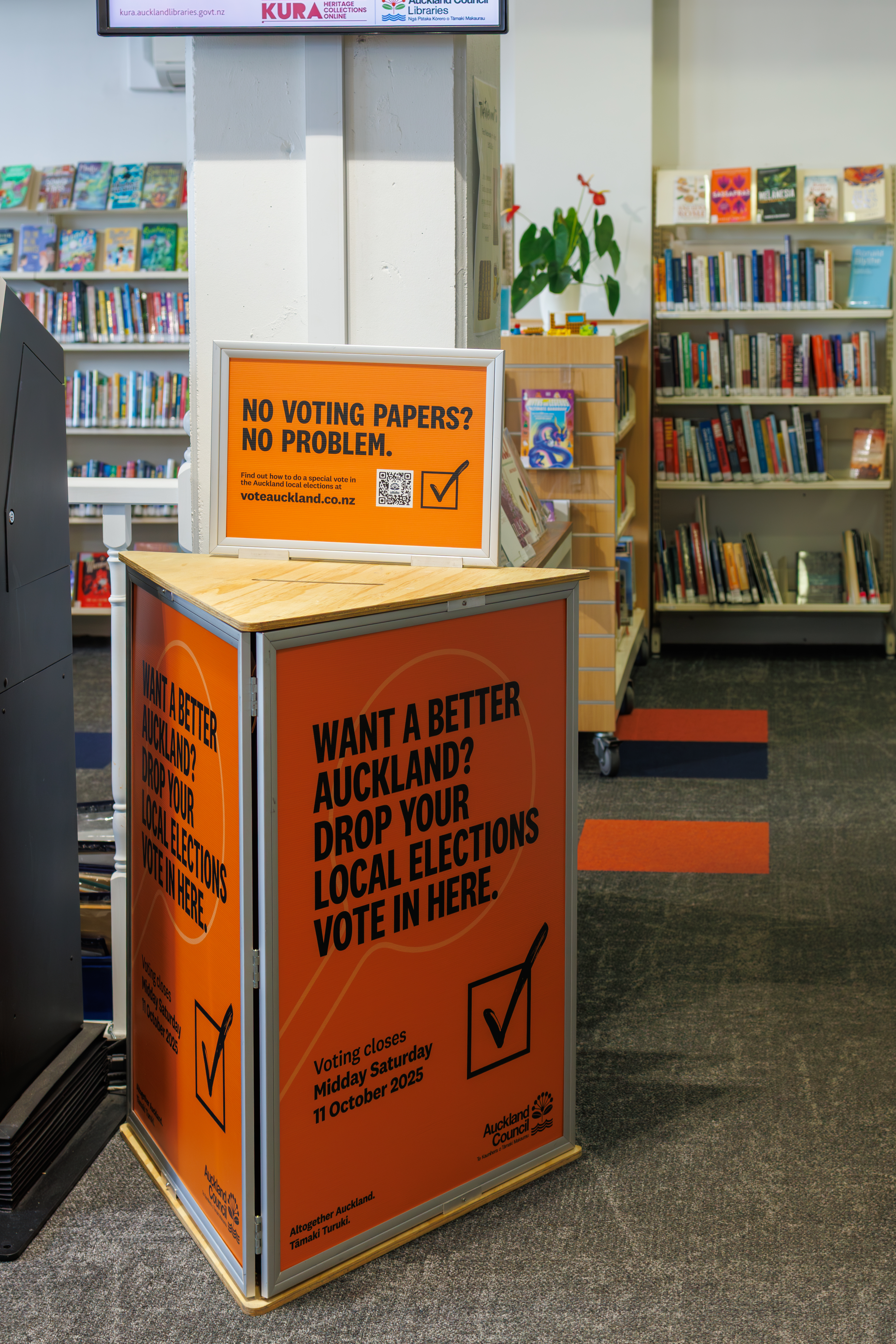
Voting box used in the election

== Summary ==
=== Composition ===
Ward	2022		Elected	
Mayor	Independent	Wayne Brown	Fix Auckland	Wayne Brown
Albany	Putting People First	John Watson	Putting People First	John Watson
Albany	Putting People First	Wayne Walker	Fix Auckland	Victoria Short
Albert-Eden-Puketāpapa	C&R	Christine Fletcher	C&R	Christine Fletcher
Albert-Eden-Puketāpapa	City Vision	Julie Fairey	City Vision	Julie Fairey
Franklin	Team Franklin	Andy Baker	Team Franklin	Andy Baker
Howick	Independent	Sharon Stewart^{R}	Independent	Bo Burns
Howick	Independent	Maurice Williamson	Independent	Maurice Williamson
Manukau	Labour	Lotu Fuli	Labour	Lotu Fuli
Manukau	Labour	Alf Filipaina	Labour	Alf Filipaina
Manurewa-Papakura	Independent	Angela Dalton^{R}	MPAT	Matt Winiata
Manurewa-Papakura	MPAT	Daniel Newman	MPAT	Daniel Newman
Maungakiekie-Tāmaki	Labour	Josephine Bartley	Labour	Josephine Bartley
North Shore	Independent	Chris Darby^{R}	Independent	John Gillon
North Shore	Independent	Richard Hills	Independent	Richard Hills
Ōrākei	C&R	Desley Simpson	Fix Auckland	Desley Simpson
Rodney	Independent	Greg Sayers	Independent	Greg Sayers
Waitākere	Labour	Shane Henderson	Labour	Shane Henderson
Waitākere	WestWards	Ken Turner	WestWards	Ken Turner
Waitematā and Gulf	Independent	Mike Lee	Independent	Mike Lee
Whau	Labour	Kerrin Leoni^{R}	Labour	Sarah Paterson-Hamlin
^{R} did not run for re-election

=== Candidates ===
Party / ticket	Mayor				Councillors			
Party / ticket	2022	Candidates	Elected	+/−	2022	Candidates	Elected	+/−
Independent	1	10	0	▼1	7	46	6	▼1
Labour	no candidates				5	5	5	0
Fix Auckland	(new)	1	1	▲1	(new)	5	2	▲2
MPAT	no candidates				1	2	2	▲1
City Vision	no candidates				1	3	1	0
WestWards	no candidates				1	3	1	0
Team Franklin	no candidates				1	1	1	0
Putting People First	no candidates				2	2	1	▼1
C&R	no candidates				2	4	1	▼1
Animal Justice	0	1	0	0	no candidates			
Future West	no candidates				0	1	0	0
Green	no candidates				0	1	0	0
Love MP	no candidates				0	2	0	0
ACT Local	no candidates				(new)	5	0	0
Total:	1	12	1	0	20	80	20	0

=== Incumbents not seeking re-election ===
- Angela Dalton, Manurewa-Papakura ward councillor since 2019
- Chris Darby, North Shore Ward councillor since 2013
- Kerrin Leoni, Whau ward councillor since 2022 (ran for Mayor of Auckland)
- Sharon Stewart, Howick ward councillor since 2010

== Mayoral election ==
The incumbent Mayor of Auckland, Wayne Brown, who was first elected in 2022, ran for re-election in 2025. Additional confirmed mayoral candidates included former New Conservatives Party co-leader Ted Johnston and Whau Ward councillor Kerrin Leoni.

Incumbent mayor Wayne Brown won re-election to a second term, receiving 180,130 votes to second place candidate Kerrin Leoni's 77,577 votes.

== Albany ward ==
2025 Albany ward election
- Turnout: 43,259 (30.93% ▼7.63 pp)
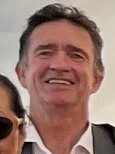
	Fix
Candidate	Victoria Short	John Watson
Party	Fix Auckland	Putting People First
Popular vote	16,410	15,449
Percentage	37.93%	35.71%
	PPF	Fix
Candidate	Wayne Walker	Gary Brown
Party	Putting People First	Fix Auckland
Popular vote	14,885	10,269
Percentage	34.41%	23.74%
Councillors before election
John Watson (PPF)
Wayne Walker (PPF)
Elected Councillors
Victoria Short (Fix)
John Watson (PPF)

The Albany ward returned two councillors to the council. Victoria Short emerged as the top polling candidate, taking the seat off of Wayne Walker leaving the Putting People First duo split with John Watson maintaining his seat. Short was elected on Mayor Brown's Fix Auckland ticket, with her co-candidate Gary Brown coming fourth in the race.

=== Candidates ===
Candidate	Affiliation (Note: A candidate may leave their affiliation blank, run as an independent, or run with an affiliation to an organisation, local body ticket or political party. Auckland Council does not allow election slogans to be used for the affiliation.)	Notes
Callum Blair	Independent	Upper Harbour Local Board member
Gary Brown	Fix Auckland	Hibiscus and Bays Local Board deputy chair
Dylan Davey	None	
John McCallum	None	
Samuel Mills	ACT Local	Hibiscus and Bays Local Board member
Kyle Parker	None	Upper Harbour Local Board member
Victoria Short	Fix Auckland	Hibiscus and Bays Local Board member
Wayne Walker	Putting People First	Councillor since 2010
John Watson	Putting People First	Councillor since 2013

==== Donations and expenses ====
Candidate	Donations	Expenses
Callum Blair (IND)	$0.00	$0.00
Gary Brown (FIX)	$3,394.30	$4,111.04
Dylan Davey (IND)	$0.00	$0.00
John McCallum (IND)	$0.00	$240.00
Samuel Mills (ACT)	$4,322.54	$54,305.44
Kyle Parker (IND)	$2,604.73	$103.33
Victoria Short (FIX)	$4,568.74	$8,178.93
Wayne Walker (PPF)	$0.00	$14,633.00
John Watson (PPF)	$0.00	$14,633.00
Source: Auckland Council

=== Albany ward result ===
Albany ward
Party	Candidate	Votes	%	±%
Fix Auckland	Victoria Short	16,410	37.93	+8.52
Putting People First	John Watson^{†}	15,449	35.71	−4.72
Putting People First	Wayne Walker^{†}	14,885	34.41	−4.90
Fix Auckland	Gary Brown	10,269	23.74	(new)
ACT Local	Samuel Mills	7,771	17.96	(new)
Independent	Dylan Davey	5,108	11.81	(new)
Independent	Kyle Parker	4,977	11.51	(new)
Independent	Callum Blair	3,172	7.33	−5.40
Independent	John McCallum	1,372	3.17	(new)
Informal votes		105	0.24	+0.07
Blank votes		1,267	2.93	−3.11
Turnout		43,259	30.93	−7.63
Registered electors		139,858		
Fix Auckland gain from Putting People First				
Putting People First hold				
^{†} incumbent

== Albert-Eden-Puketāpapa ward ==
2025 Albert-Eden-Puketāpapa ward election
- Turnout: 34,397 (28.52% ▼7.22 pp)
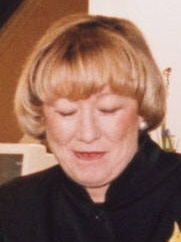
	CV
Candidate	Julie Fairey	Christine Fletcher
Party	City Vision	C&R
Popular vote	15,962	15,425
Percentage	46.41%	44.84%
	CV	C&R
Candidate	Jon Turner	Mark Pervan
Party	City Vision	C&R
Popular vote	12,990	8,441
Percentage	37.76%	24.54%
Councillors before election
Julie Fairey (CV)
Christine Fletcher (C&R)
Elected Councillors
Julie Fairey (CV)
Christine Fletcher (C&R)

The Albert-Eden-Puketāpapa ward returned two councillors to the council.

=== Candidates ===
Candidate	Photo	Affiliation	Notes
Jacob Calvert		None	
Samuel Clarke		Independent	
Julie Fairey		City Vision	Councillor since 2022
Christine Fletcher		Communities & Residents	Councillor since 2010
Mark Pervan		Communities & Residents	Puketāpapa Local Board member
Paul Sun		Independent	
Jon Turner		City Vision	Puketāpapa Local Board member Green endorsed.
Matt Zwartz		None	

=== Albert-Eden-Puketāpapa ward result ===
Albert-Eden-Puketāpapa ward
Party	Candidate	Votes	%	±%
City Vision	Julie Fairey^{†}	15,962	46.41	+6.87
C&R	Christine Fletcher^{†}	15,425	44.84	−1.81
City Vision	Jon Turner	12,990	37.76	(new)
C&R	Mark Pervan	8,441	24.54	(new)
Independent	Paul Sun	5,060	14.71	(new)
Independent	Matt Zwartz	2,607	7.58	(new)
Independent	Samuel Clarke	2,047	5.95	(new)
Independent	Jacob Calvert	1,457	4.24	(new)
Informal votes		56	0.16	+0.08
Blank votes		838	2.44	−2.71
Turnout		34,397	28.52	−7.22
Registered electors		120,589		
City Vision hold				
C&R hold				
^{†} incumbent

== Franklin ward ==
2025 Franklin ward election
- Turnout: 19,203 (32.24% ▼10.35 pp)
	TF	ACT	Ind
Candidate	Andy Baker	Dene Green	Les Thomas
Party	Team Franklin	ACT Local	Independent
Popular vote	10,912	4,395	3,341
Percentage	56.82%	22.89%	17.40%
Councillor before election
Andy Baker (TF)
Elected Councillor
Andy Baker (TF)

The Franklin ward returned one councillor to the council.

=== Candidates ===
Candidate	Affiliation	Notes
Andy Baker	Team Franklin	Councillor since 2022
Dene Green	ACT Local	Business owner. Also standing for the Franklin Local Board.
Les Thomas	Independent	

=== Franklin ward result ===
Franklin ward
Party	Candidate	Votes	%	±%
Team Franklin	Andy Baker^{†}	10,912	56.82	−1.57
ACT Local	Dene Green	4,395	22.89	(new)
Independent	Les Thomas	3,341	17.40	(new)
Informal votes		21	0.11	+0.07
Blank votes		534	2.78	−0.60
Turnout		19,203	32.24	−10.35
Registered electors		59,559		
Team Franklin hold				
^{†} incumbent

== Howick ward ==
2025 Howick ward election
- Turnout: 32,474 (28.84% ▼6.89 pp)
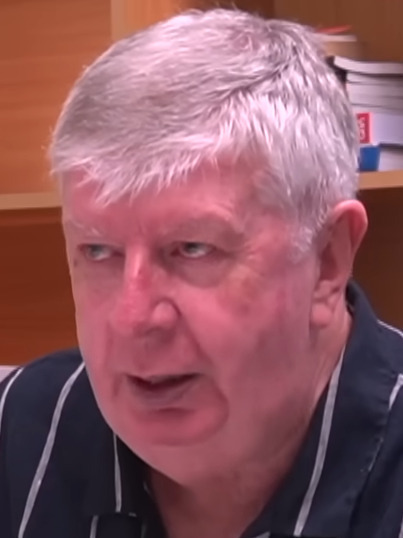
	Ind
Candidate	Bo Burns	Maurice Williamson
Party	Independent	Independent
Popular vote	12,038	11,535
Percentage	37.07%	35.52%
	Ind	Ind
Candidate	Paul Young	Damian Light
Party	Independent	Independent
Popular vote	9,615	7,873
Percentage	29.61%	24.24%
Councillors before election
Bo Burns (Ind)
Maurice Williamson (Ind)
Elected Councillors
Bo Burns (Ind)
Maurice Williamson (Ind)

The Howick ward returned two councillors to the council.

=== Candidates ===
Candidate	Photo	Affiliation	Notes
Bo Burns		None	Howick Local Board deputy chairperson; owner of Times Media
Ali Dahche		ACT Local	Business owner and infrastructure specialist
Stephen Hill		None	
Barry Jensen		None	
Damian Light		Independent	Howick Local Board chairperson; former United Future party leader
Leanne Seniloli		None	
Maurice Williamson		Independent	Councillor since 2022
Paul Young		Independent	Former councillor from 2018 to 2022

=== Howick ward result ===
Howick ward
Party	Candidate	Votes	%	±%
Independent	Bo Burns	12,038	37.07	+6.70
Independent	Maurice Williamson^{†}	11,535	35.52	−2.92
Independent	Paul Young	9,615	29.61	−1.78
Independent	Damian Light	7,873	24.24	−1.73
Independent	Barry Jensen	5,461	16.82	(new)
Independent	Stephen Hill	4,736	14.58	(new)
ACT Local	Ali Dahche	3,902	12.02	(new)
Independent	Leanne Seniloli	2,947	9.07	(new)
Informal votes		108	0.33	0.00
Blank votes		642	1.98	−1.20
Turnout		32,474	28.84	−6.89
Registered electors		112,594		
Independent gain from Independent				
Independent hold				
^{†} incumbent

== Manukau ward ==
2025 Manukau ward election
- Turnout: 28,586 (25.28% ▲1.03 pp)
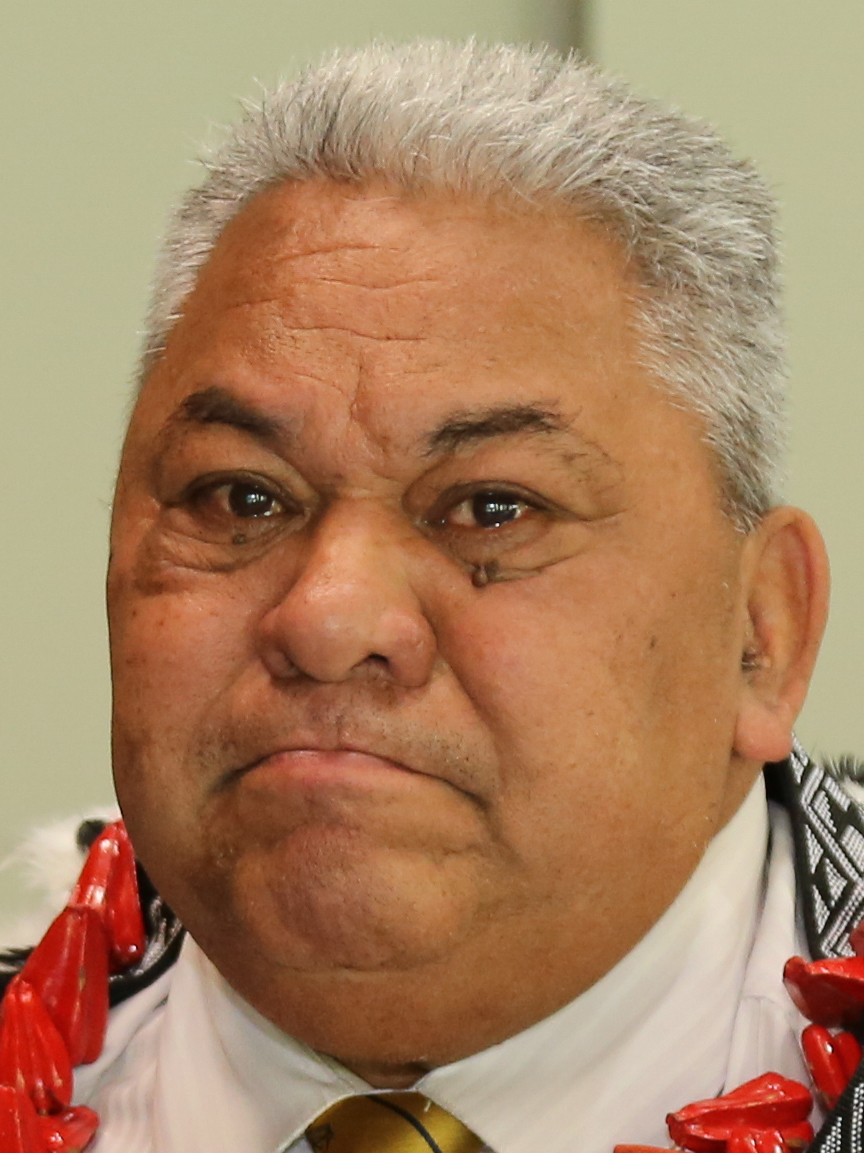

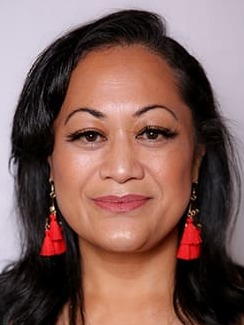
Candidate	Alf Filipaina	Lotu Fuli
Party	Labour	Labour
Popular vote	13,406	12,193
Percentage	46.90%	42.65%
	Ind	Ind
Candidate	Carol Ah-Voa	Swanie Nelson
Party	Independent	Independent
Popular vote	5,599	5,087
Percentage	19.59%	17.80%
Councillors before election
Alf Filipaina (Labour)
Lotu Fuli (Labour)
Elected Councillors
Alf Filipaina (Labour)
Lotu Fuli (Labour)

The Manukau ward returned two councillors to the council.

=== Candidates ===
Candidate	Photo	Affiliation	Notes
Carol Ah-Voa		None	
Henrietta Devoe		ACT Local	Real estate agent
Alf Filipaina		Labour	Councillor since 2010
Lotu Fuli		Labour	Councillor since 2022
Vicky Hau		Fix Auckland	Māngere Town Centre manager
Christopher Hughes		Independent	
Luke Mealamu		Fix Auckland	Security firm owner, and brother of ex-All Black Keven Mealamu
Swanie Nelson		None	Former Ōtara-Papatoetoe local board member for Labour (2019–2023)
Malcolm Turner		Communities & Residents	

=== Manukau ward result ===
Manukau ward
Party	Candidate	Votes	%	±%
Labour	Alf Filipaina^{†}	13,406	46.90	−15.86
Labour	Lotu Fuli^{†}	12,193	42.65	−13.36
Independent	Carol Ah-Voa	5,599	19.59	(new)
Independent	Swanie Nelson	5,087	17.80	(new)
Fix Auckland	Luke Mealamu	4,422	15.47	(new)
Fix Auckland	Vicky Hau	4,301	15.05	(new)
ACT Local	Henriette Devoe	3,328	11.64	(new)
Independent	Christopher Hughes	2,116	7.40	(new)
C&R	Malcolm Turner	2,065	7.22	−24.70
Informal votes		74	0.26	+0.16
Blank votes		784	2.74	−2.30
Turnout		28,586	25.28	+1.03
Registered electors		113,082		
Labour hold				
Labour hold				
^{†} incumbent

== Manurewa-Papakura ward ==
2025 Manurewa-Papakura ward election
- Turnout: 27,087 (24.26% ▼2.23 pp)
	MPAT	MPAT
Candidate	Daniel Newman	Matt Winiata
Party	MPAT	MPAT
Popular vote	15,661	13,270
Percentage	57.82%	48.99%
	LMP	LMP
Candidate	Joseph Allan	Angela Cunningham-Marino
Party	Love MP	Love MP
Popular vote	7,605	7,388
Percentage	28.08%	27.28%
Councillors before election
Daniel Newman (MPAT)
Angela Dalton (Ind)
Elected Councillors
Daniel Newman (MPAT)
Matt Winiata (MPAT)

The Manurewa-Papakura ward returned two councillors to the council.

=== Candidates ===
Candidate	Affiliation	Notes
Joseph Allan	#LoveManurewaPapakura	Manurewa Local Board Member
Glenn Archibald	Independent	
Angela Cunningham-Marino	#LoveManurewaPapakura	Manurewa Local Board Member
Karin Kirk	Independent	
Daniel Newman	Manurewa-Papakura Action Team	Councillor since 2016
Matt Winiata	Manurewa-Papakura Action Team	Manurewa Local Board Chairperson
Tofa Winterstein	None	

=== Manurewa-Papakura ward result ===
Manurewa-Papakura ward
Party	Candidate	Votes	%	±%
MPAT	Daniel Newman^{†}	15,661	57.82	+2.57
MPAT	Matt Winiata	13,270	48.99	(new)
Love Manurewa Papakura	Joseph Allan	7,605	28.08	(new)
Love Manurewa Papakura	Angela Cunningham-Marino	7,388	27.28	(new)
Independent	Karin Kerr	2,754	10.17	−0.89
Independent	Glenn Archibald	1,982	7.32	(new)
Independent	Tofa Winterstein	1,741	6.43	(new)
Informal votes		45	0.17	+0.2
Blank votes		596	2.20	−1.16
Turnout		27,087	24.26	−2.23
Registered electors		111,636		
MPAT hold				
MPAT gain from Independent				
^{†} incumbent

== Maungakiekie-Tāmaki ward ==
2025 Maungakiekie-Tāmaki ward election
- Turnout: 14,769 (26.40% ▼5.86 pp)
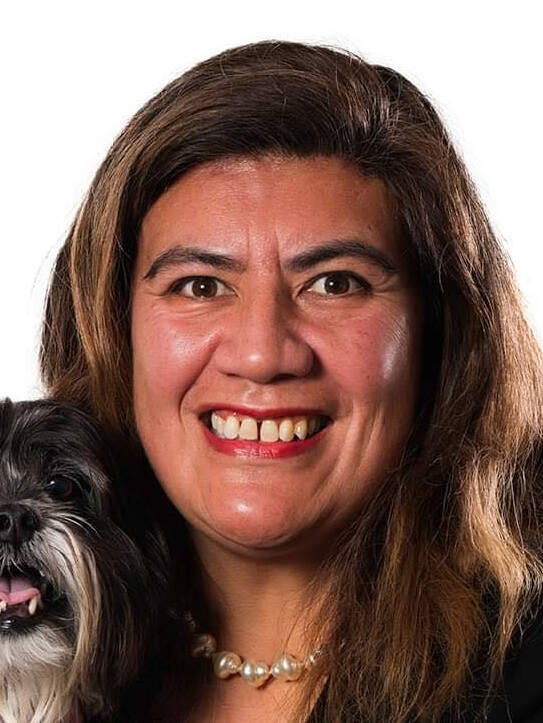
		C&R
Candidate	Josephine Bartley	Tabetha Elliott
Party	Labour	C&R
Popular vote	7,818	3,567
Percentage	52.94%	24.15%
	Ind	Ind
Candidate	John Alcock	Patrick O'Meara
Party	Independent	Independent
Popular vote	1,590	850
Percentage	10.77%	5.76%
Councillor before election
Josephine Bartley (Labour)
Elected Councillor
Josephine Bartley (Labour)

The Maungakiekie-Tamaki ward returned one councillor to the council.

=== Candidates ===
Candidate	Photo	Affiliation	Notes
John Alcock		None	Also ran for Mayor of Auckland
Josephine Bartley		Labour	Councillor since 2018
Tabetha Elliott		Communities & Residents	Mount Wellington Licensing Trust Member
Fa'afuhia Michael Fia		Independent	
Patrick O'Meara		Independent	Perennial candidate

=== Maungakiekie-Tāmaki ward result ===
Maungakiekie-Tāmaki ward
Party	Candidate	Votes	%	±%
Labour	Josephine Bartley^{†}	7,818	52.94	+8.00
C&R	Tabetha Elliott	3,567	24.15	(new)
Independent	John Alcock	1,590	10.77	(new)
Independent	Patrick O'Meara	850	5.76	(new)
Independent	FaAfuhia Michael Fia	593	4.02	(new)
Informal votes		25	0.17	+0.02
Blank votes		326	2.21	−2.62
Turnout		14,769	26.40	−5.86
Registered electors		55,939		
Labour hold				
^{†} incumbent

== North Shore ward ==
2025 North Shore ward election
- Turnout: 33,905 (31.03% ▼6.78 pp)
	Ind	Ind
Candidate	Richard Hills	John Watson
Party	Independent	Independent
Popular vote	21,325	17,166
Percentage	62.90%	50.63%
	Ind	ACT
Candidate	Danielle Grant	Helena Roza
Party	Independent	ACT Local
Popular vote	14,885	6,368
Percentage	37.12%	18.78%
Councillors before election
Richard Hills (Ind)
Chris Darby (Ind)
Elected Councillors
Richard Hills (Ind)
John Gillon (Ind)

The North Shore ward returned two councillors to the council.

=== Candidates ===
Candidate	Affiliation	Notes
Eric Chuah	Independent	Also ran for Mayor of Auckland
John Gillon	Putting the North Shore First	Kaipātiki Local Board chairperson
Danielle Grant	The Shore Choice	Kaipātiki Local Board deputy chairperson
Richard Hills	Positive Leadership for the Shore	Councillor since 2016
Helena Roza	ACT Local	Business owner

=== North Shore ward result ===
North Shore ward
Party	Candidate	Votes	%	±%
Independent	Richard Hills^{†}	21,325	62.90	+15.52
Independent	John Gillon	17,166	50.63	(new)
Independent	Danielle Grant	12,585	37.12	+1.26
ACT Local	Helena Roza	6,368	18.78	(new)
Independent	Eric Chuah	3,625	10.69	(new)
Informal votes		45	0.13	−0.01
Blank votes		471	1.39	−1.52
Turnout		33,905	31.03	−6.78
Registered electors		109,265		
Independent hold				
Independent gain from Independent				
^{†} incumbent

== Ōrākei ward ==
2025 Ōrākei ward election
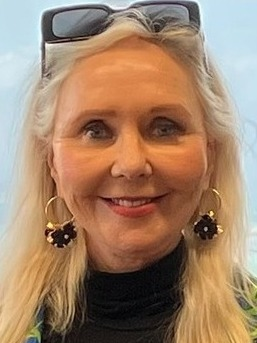
Candidate	Desley Simpson
Party	Fix Auckland
Popular vote	Unopposed
Councillor before election
Desley Simpson (Ind)
Elected Councillor
Desley Simpson (Fix)

The Ōrākei ward returned one councillor to the council.

=== Candidates ===
Candidate	Photo	Affiliation	Notes
Desley Simpson		Fix Auckland	Incumbent councillor and deputy mayor

=== Ōrākei ward result ===
Ōrākei ward
Party	Candidate	Votes	%	±%
Fix Auckland	Desley Simpson^{†}	elected unopposed		
Registered electors		67,785		
Fix Auckland gain from Independent				
^{†} incumbent

== Rodney ward ==
2025 Rodney ward election
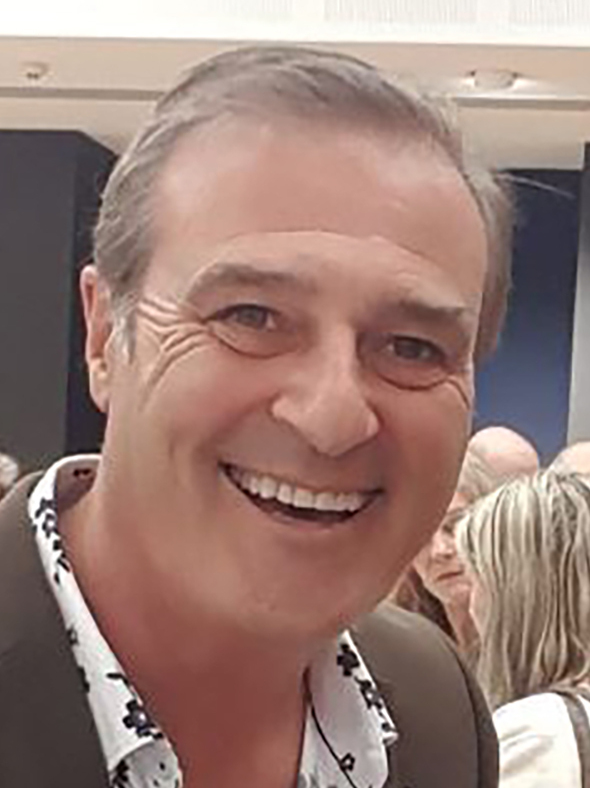
Candidate	Greg Sayers
Party	Independent
Popular vote	Unopposed
Councillor before election
Greg Sayers (Ind)
Elected Councillor
Greg Sayers (Ind)

The Rodney ward returned one councillor to the council.

=== Candidates ===
Candidate	Photo	Affiliation	Notes
Greg Sayers		Independent	Councillor since 2016

=== Rodney ward result ===
Rodney ward
Party	Candidate	Votes	%	±%
Independent	Greg Sayers^{†}	elected unopposed		
Registered electors		55,943		
Independent hold				
^{†} incumbent

== Waitākere ward ==
2025 Waitākere ward election
- Turnout: 35,319 (27.98% ▼4.93 pp)
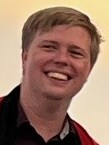
		WW
Candidate	Shane Henderson	Ken Turner
Party	Labour	WestWards
Popular vote	14,589	9,073
Percentage	41.31%	25.69%
	Ind	FW
Candidate	Linda Cooper	Jess Rose
Party	Independent	Future West
Popular vote	6,852	6,430
Percentage	19.40%	18.21%
Councillors before election
Shane Henderson (Labour)
Ken Turner (WW)
Elected Councillors
Shane Henderson (Labour)
Ken Turner (WW)

The Waitākere ward returned two councillors to the council.

=== Candidates ===
Candidate	Affiliation	Notes
Peter Chan	Independent	Henderson-Massey Local Board member
Linda Cooper	None	Former councillor from 2013 to 2022
Michael Coote	Independent	Also ran for Mayor of Auckland
Jim Cornes	Independent	
Shane Henderson	Labour	Councillor since 2019
Sunil Kaushal	WestWards	
Seamus Lal	None	
Kay Luv	None	
Ingrid Papau	Independent	Henderson-Massey Local Board member
Jessica Rose	Future West	Green endorsed
Serge Roud	None	
Ken Turner	WestWards	Councillor since 2022

=== Waitākere ward result ===
Waitākere ward
Party	Candidate	Votes	%	±%
Labour	Shane Henderson^{†}	14,589	41.31	−0.09
WestWards	Ken Turner^{†}	9,073	25.69	−10.98
Independent	Linda Cooper	6,852	19.40	−15.62
Future West	Jess Rose	6,430	18.21	(new)
WestWards	Sunil Kaushal	6,202	17.56	(new)
Independent	Ingrid Papau	5,011	14.19	(new)
Independent	Peter Chan	4,556	12.90	−7.62
Independent	Jim Cornes	4,481	12.69	(new)
Independent	Serge Roud	2,498	7.07	(new)
Independent	Kay Luv	2,287	6.48	(new)
Independent	Michael Coote	2,190	6.20	−0.18
Independent	Seamus Lal	1,545	4.37	(new)
Informal votes		97	0.27	+0.12
Blank votes		688	1.95	−1.87
Turnout		35,319	27.98	−4.93
Registered electors		126,220		
Labour hold				
WestWards hold				
^{†} incumbent

== Waitematā and Gulf ward ==
2025 Waitematā and Gulf ward election
- Turnout: 21,675 (27.98% ▼11.47 pp)
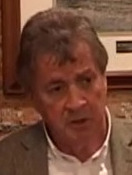

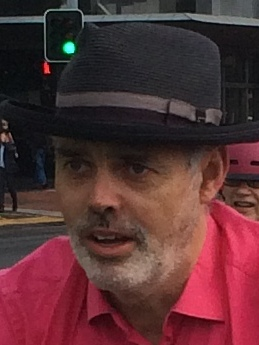
Candidate	Mike Lee	Patrick Reynolds
Party	Independent	City Vision
Popular vote	7,991	6,135
Percentage	36.87%	28.30%
	Ind	Ind
Candidate	Genevieve Sage	Ian Loan
Party	Independent	Independent
Popular vote	3,594	1,268
Percentage	16.58%	5.85%
Councillor before election
Mike Lee (Ind)
Elected Councillor
Mike Lee (Ind)

The Waitematā and Gulf ward returned one councillor to the council.

=== Candidates ===
Candidate	Photo	Affiliation	Notes
Lester Bryant		None	
Mike Lee		Auckland Independents	Councillor from 2010 to 2019, and again since 2022
Ian Loan		None	
Selena Yanpei-Lu Renne		None	
Patrick Reynolds		City Vision	Deputy chair of the City Centre Advisory Panel
Genevieve Sage		Independent	Waitematā Local Board chairperson

=== Waitematā and Gulf ward result ===
Waitematā and Gulf ward
Party	Candidate	Votes	%	±%
Independent	Mike Lee^{†}	7,991	36.87	−8.32
City Vision	Patrick Reynolds	6,135	28.30	(new)
Independent	Genevieve Sage	3,594	16.58	(new)
Independent	Ian Loan	1,268	5.85	(new)
Independent	Selena Renner	997	4.60	(new)
Independent	Lester Bryant	735	3.39	(new)
Informal votes		37	0.17	+0.12
Blank votes		918	4.24	−2.89
Turnout		21,675	27.98	−11.47
Registered electors		63,542		
Independent hold				
^{†} incumbent

== Whau ward ==
2025 Whau ward election
- Turnout: 15,166 (27.98% ▼5.75 pp)
	LAB	WW
Candidate	Sarah Paterson-Hamlin	Craig Lord
Party	Labour	WestWards
Popular vote	5,171	3,376
Percentage	34.10%	22.26%
	GRN	Ind
Candidate	Anjana Iyer	Paul Davie
Party	Green	Independent
Popular vote	1,922	1,882
Percentage	12.67%	12.41%
Councillor before election
Kerrin Leoni (Labour)
Elected Councillor
Sarah Paterson-Hamlin (Labour)

The Whau ward returned one councillor to the council.

=== Candidates ===
Candidate	Affiliation	Notes
Paul Davie	Voice of the People	Perennial candidate
Anjana Iyer	Green	Designer. Also ran for the Whau Local Board.
Craig Lord	Westwards	Mayoral candidate in 2019 and 2022
Morgan Luxton	None	
Sarah Paterson-Hamlin	Labour	Whau Local Board member
Bruce Xu	Independent	

=== Whau ward result ===
Whau ward
Party	Candidate	Votes	%	±%
Labour	Sarah Paterson-Hamlin	5,171	34.10	(new)
WestWards	Craig Lord	3,376	22.26	(new)
Green	Anjana Iyer	1,922	12.67	(new)
Independent	Paul Davie	1,882	12.41	(new)
Independent	Morgan Luxton	1,301	8.58	(new)
Independent	Bruce Xu	955	6.30	(new)
Informal votes		30	0.20	+0.16
Blank votes		529	3.49	+5.16
Turnout		15,166	25.73	−5.75
Registered electors		58,941		
Labour hold				

== Local boards ==
Elections were also held for the 21 local boards in Auckland.

Local board	Seats	Board members				Details	Refs
Local board	Seats	2022		Elected		Details	Refs
Albert-Eden	8	Communities and Residents	4	City Vision	5	Details	
Albert-Eden	8	City Vision	4	Communities and Residents	3	Details	
Aotea / Great Barrier	5	Independent	5	Independent	5	Details	
Devonport-Takapuna	6	A Fresh Approach	4	A Fresh Approach	2	Details	
Devonport-Takapuna	6	Communities and Residents	2	Communities and Residents	2	Details	
Devonport-Takapuna	6			Independent	2	Details	
Franklin	9	Team Franklin	8	Team Franklin	8	Details	
Franklin	9	Independent	1	Independent	1	Details	
Henderson-Massey	8	Labour	5	Labour	6	Details	
Henderson-Massey	8	Independent	3	WestWards	1	Details	
Henderson-Massey	8			Independent	1	Details	
Hibiscus and Bays	8	Coast People	3	Backing the Bays	4	Details	
Hibiscus and Bays	8	Backing the Bays	3	Coast Community	2	Details	
Hibiscus and Bays	8	Independent Locals	1	Coast People	2	Details	
Hibiscus and Bays	8	Team Coast	1			Details	
Howick	11	#weknow	4	Independent	3	Details	
Howick	11	Practical not Political	2	Communities and Residents	3	Details	
Howick	11	Communities and Residents	2	#weknowhowick	2	Details	
Howick	11	Independent	1	Healthy and Happy	2	Details	
Howick	11			Practical Not Political	1	Details	
Kaipātiki	8	Shore Action	8	Shore Action	7	Details	
Kaipātiki	8			Independent	1	Details	
Māngere-Ōtāhuhu	7	Labour	7	Labour	7	Details	
Manurewa	8	Manurewa Action Team	5	Manurewa Action Team	7	Details	
Manurewa	8	#LoveManurewa	3	#LoveManurewa	1	Details	
Maungakiekie-Tāmaki	7	Labour	4	Communities and Residents	4	Details	
Maungakiekie-Tāmaki	7	Communities and Residents	3	Labour	3	Details	
Ōrākei	7	Communities and Residents	7	Communities and Residents	6	Details	
Ōrākei	7			ACT Local	1	Details	
Ōtara-Papatoetoe	7	Labour	5	vacant (Note: See 2026 Ōtara-Papatoetoe Local Board by-election for further info.)	4	Details	
Ōtara-Papatoetoe	7	Independently Papatoetoe	1	Labour	3	Details	
Ōtara-Papatoetoe	7	Independent	1			Details	
Papakura	6	Papakura Action Team	6	Papakura Action Team	6	Details	
Puketāpapa	6	Communities and Residents	4	Communities and Residents	4	Details	
Puketāpapa	6	Roskill Community Voice	2	City Vision	2	Details	
Rodney	9	Rodney First	5	Independent	9	Details	
Rodney	9	Independent	3			Details	
Upper Harbour	6	Living Upper Harbour	3	Living Upper Harbour	4	Details	
Upper Harbour	6	Independent	3	Independent	2	Details	
Waiheke	5	Independent	5	Independent	5	Details	
Waitākere Ranges	6	Future West	4	Future West	5	Details	
Waitākere Ranges	6	WestWards	2	WestWards	1	Details	
Waitematā	7	Communities and Residents	4	City Vision	5	Details	
Waitematā	7	City Vision	3	Communities and Residents	2	Details	
Whau	7	Labour	5	Labour	4	Details	
Whau	7	Independent	2	Independent	3	Details	
All 21 local boards	151						
