= Middlemore =

- Suburb
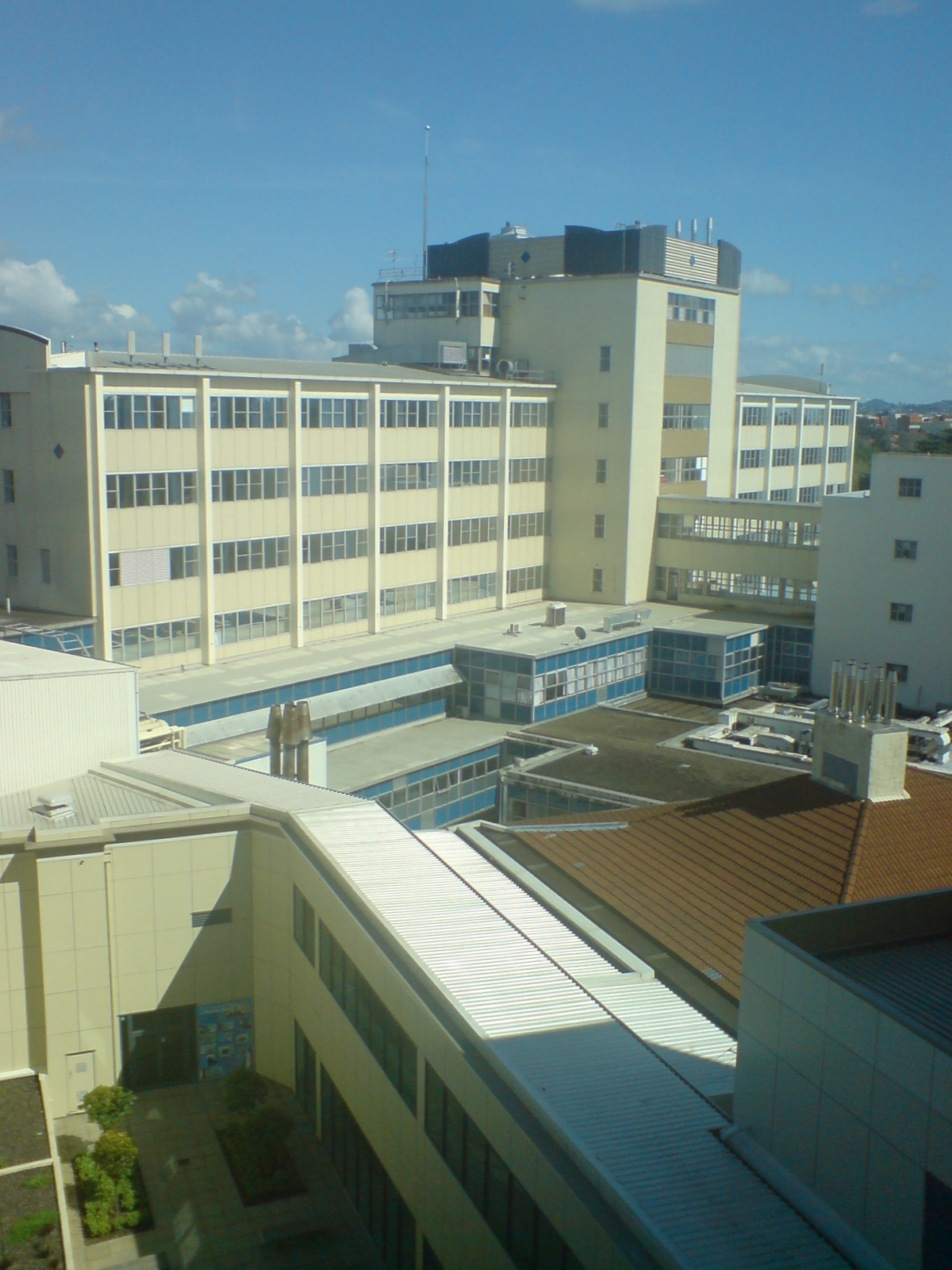
- Middlemore Hospital buildings
- Interactive map of Middlemore
- Coordinates: 36.962458°S 174.838970°E
- Country: New Zealand
- City: Auckland
- Local authority: Auckland Council
- Electoral ward: Manukau ward
- Local board: Ōtara-Papatoetoe Local Board

Area
  - Land: 72 ha (180 acres)

Population (June 2025)
  - Total: 130
  - Density: 180/km^{2} (470/sq mi)
- Train stations: Middlemore Railway Station
- Hospitals: Middlemore Hospital

	Ōtāhuhu
Māngere East	Middlemore	Ōtara
	Papatoetoe

Middlemore is a suburb of the former Manukau City, one of the four cities that made up the conurbation of Auckland, in northern New Zealand, until 2010.

The suburb is located on flat land at the southern end of the Ōtāhuhu isthmus, at the end of an arm of the Tamaki River and 18 kilometres southeast of Auckland city centre. It is located on State Highway 1, and the North Island Main Trunk railway passes by the Middlemore Hospital.

Middlemore's most well-known landmarks are Middlemore Hospital and the Auckland Golf Club course, which surrounds the hospital grounds. Adjacent to both the golf club and Otahuhu College is the private secondary school, King's College.

== History ==
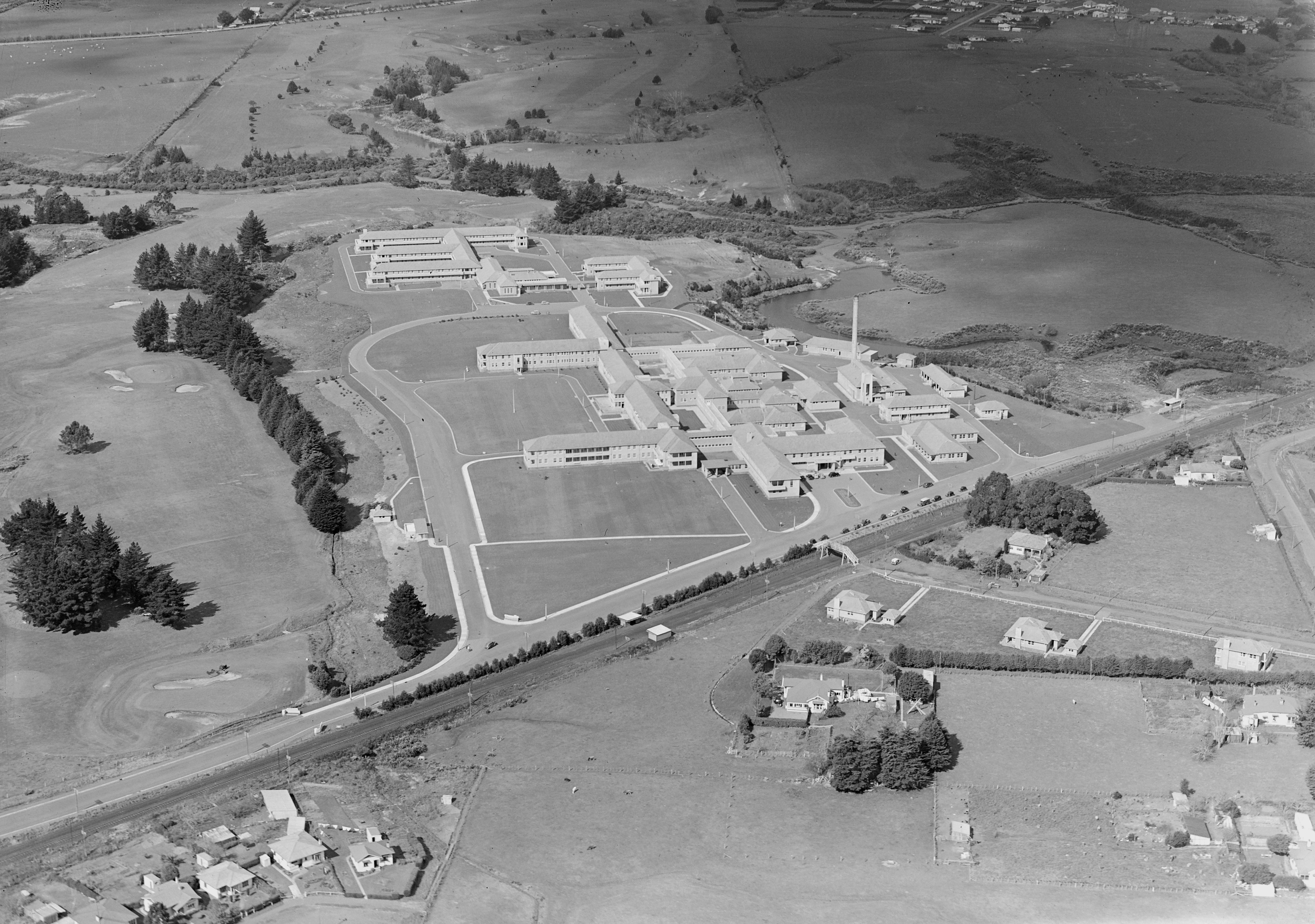
Middlemore hospital and railway station, 1947

The name 'Middlemore' refers to a region that was once known as Kohuora and was farmed beginning in the 1840s by William Thorne Buckland, who was joined by his younger brother, Alfred Buckland, in 1850. the Middlemore name came from a home that was originally owned by Richard Fairburn, the son of Anglican missionary William Thomas Fairburn, the house is now a part of the nearby Auckland Golf Club clubhouse.

The suburb of Middlemore sits on the previous site of the Waokauri / Pūkaki portage, which allowed overland connections for canoes between the Waitematā and Manukau harbours.

== Demographics ==
Middlemore covers 0.72 km^{2} (0.28 sq mi) and had an estimated population of 130 as of June 2025, with a population density of 181 people per km^{2}.

Historical population
Year	Pop.	±% p.a.
2006	273	—
2013	105	−12.76%
2018	33	−20.66%
2023	138	+33.13%

Middlemore had a population of 138 in the 2023 New Zealand census, an increase of 105 people (318.2%) since the 2018 census, and an increase of 33 people (31.4%) since the 2013 census. There were 60 males and 78 females. 2.2% of people identified as LGBTIQ+. The median age was 49.3 years (compared with 38.1 years nationally). There were 6 people (4.3%) aged under 15 years, 24 (17.4%) aged 15 to 29, 63 (45.7%) aged 30 to 64, and 45 (32.6%) aged 65 or older.

People could identify as more than one ethnicity. The results were 41.3% European (Pākehā), 23.9% Māori, 26.1% Pasifika, 17.4% Asian, and 4.3% other, which includes people giving their ethnicity as "New Zealander". English was spoken by 89.1%, Māori language by 8.7%, Samoan by 6.5%, and other languages by 26.1%. The percentage of people born overseas was 41.3, compared with 28.8% nationally.

Religious affiliations were 50.0% Christian, 8.7% Hindu, 2.2% Islam, and 2.2% other religions. People who answered that they had no religion were 30.4%, and 8.7% of people did not answer the census question.

Of those at least 15 years old, 18 (13.6%) people had a bachelor's or higher degree, 66 (50.0%) had a post-high school certificate or diploma, and 45 (34.1%) people exclusively held high school qualifications. The median income was $33,300, compared with $41,500 nationally. 9 people (6.8%) earned over $100,000 compared to 12.1% nationally. The employment status of those at least 15 was that 51 (38.6%) people were employed full-time, 6 (4.5%) were part-time, and 6 (4.5%) were unemployed.
