= Filipaina =

Filipaina is a surname. Notable people with the surname include:

- Alf Filipaina, New Zealand politician
- Olsen Filipaina (1957–2022), New Zealand rugby league player
