= Efeso Collins =

New Zealand politician (1974–2024)

Faʻanānā Efeso Collins
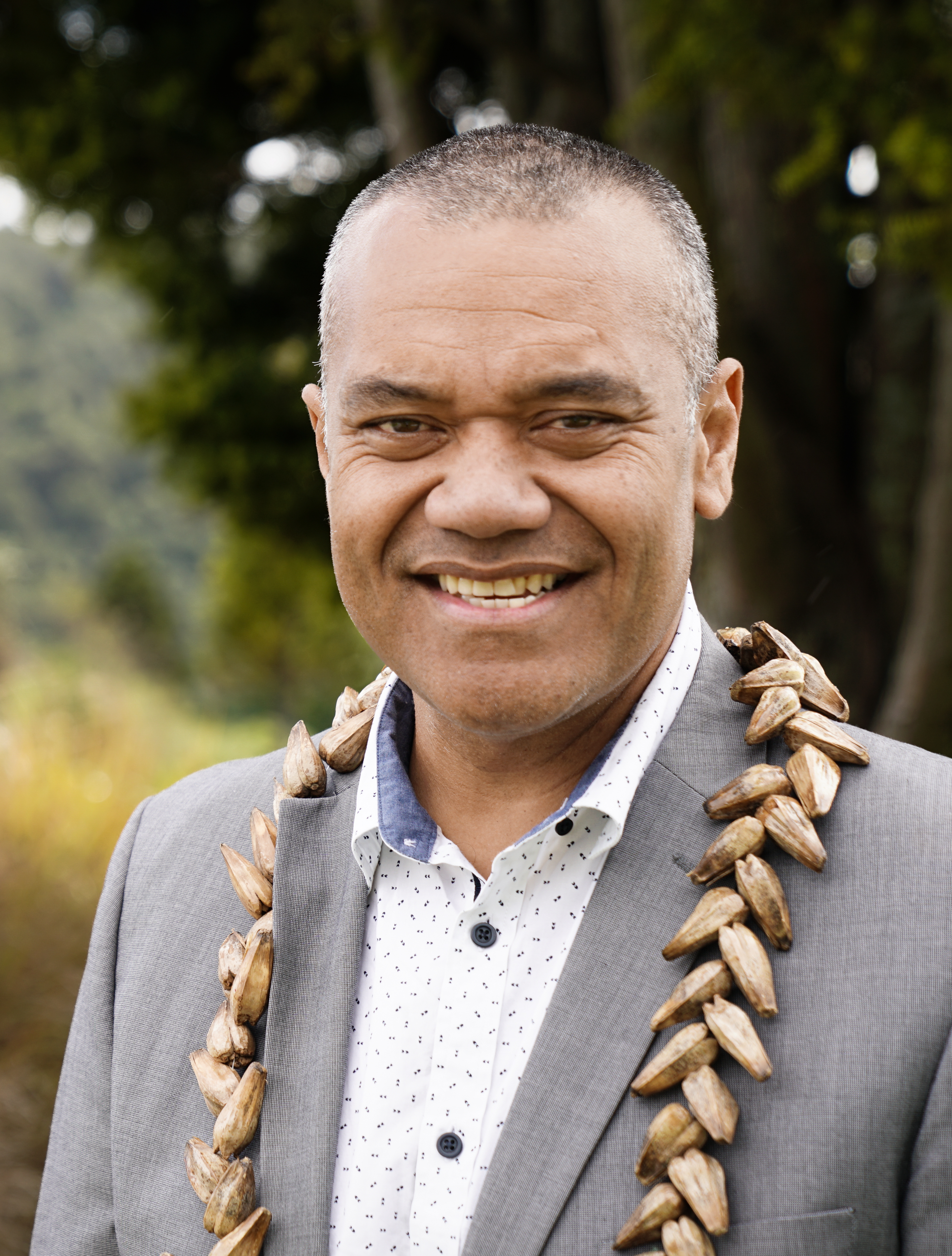
- Collins in 2023

Member of the New Zealand Parliament for Green party list
- In office 14 October 2023 – 21 February 2024
- Succeeded by: Lawrence Xu-Nan (Note: Normally, list MPs do not have individual predecessors or successors, but Collins died during a sitting parliament and therefore was succeeded by Xu-Nan.)

Manukau ward councillor
- In office 1 November 2016 – 28 October 2022
- Preceded by: Arthur Anae
- Succeeded by: Lotu Fuli

Personal details
- Born: 27 May 1974 Ōtara, Auckland, New Zealand
- Died: 21 February 2024 (aged 49) Britomart, Auckland, New Zealand
- Party: Green (2023–2024); Labour (before 2023)
- Children: 2
- Education: University of Auckland (BA, MA)

Faʻanānā Efeso Collins (27 May 1974 – 21 February 2024) was a New Zealand politician, activist, and academic. A former long-serving member of the New Zealand Labour Party, local body politician, and advocate for the Pasifika community of Auckland, he was a Member of Parliament for the Green Party of Aotearoa New Zealand from October 2023 until his sudden death in February 2024.

Collins was born in Ōtara, South Auckland, to working-class Samoan immigrants. He attended the University of Auckland, where he later lectured, and in 1999 was the first Pasifika elected as President of the Auckland University Students' Association. He soon joined the Labour Party. At the 2013 Auckland elections, Collins was elected to the Ōtara-Papatoetoe Local Board, and became an Auckland Councillor for Manukau in 2016. Collins became a leading national figure for Pasifika rights and identity. He contested the 2022 Auckland mayoral election as an independent, backed by the Labour and Green parties, (Note: Most mayoral candidates in New Zealand officially run as independents) losing to Wayne Brown. In 2023, he joined the Green Party, and was ranked high enough on their party list to enter the New Zealand Parliament as a list MP after that year's election.

Less than a week after giving his maiden speech, Collins attended a fun run on lower Queen Street, Auckland, as part of a charity event for ChildFund. He collapsed during the event and died at the scene.

== Personal life and family ==
Collins was born and raised in the South Auckland suburb of Ōtara. He was the youngest of six children to bus driver and Pentecostal Church pastor Tauiliili Sio Collins and factory worker and cleaner Lotomau Collins. His parents immigrated to New Zealand from Samoa in the 1960s, and were of mixed Samoan and Tokelauan descent. The name Collins was selected before their migration in order to support their integration into New Zealand. At primary school, Collins was also known as "Phillip" because of his teachers' unwillingness to learn how to say his given name. As an adult, Collins bore the Samoan matai title of Faʻanānā from his mother's village of Satufia, Satupaitea, Savaiʻi. He was brought up a Pentecostal Christian and later converted to Catholicism. Tauiliili died in 2008, in his early sixties. Collins had a brother, Thomas, who predeceased him.

In childhood, Collins lived for several years with his mother's family in Savaiʻi where he attended Vaega Primary School. Returning to Auckland, he attended East Tamaki Primary School and Ferguson Intermediate School. He briefly attended Auckland Grammar School before moving to Tangaroa College. He later studied education at the University of Auckland, graduating with a Bachelor of Arts in 1997 followed by a Master of Arts in 1999. His MA dissertation included discussion of 'brown flight' . He subsequently taught at the university and contributed to four published works. He was elected Auckland University Students' Association president in 1999 and was the first Polynesian in that role. As president he represented students on the Auckland University Council.

Collins' subsequent career included positions as a youth worker, a broadcaster, in the education sector and in the public service. In 2010, he briefly hosted the weekend current affairs show Talanoa Pacific on the Pacific Media Network. He was stood down from his position after he questioned a lack of transparency in the process by which a private company called the Pacific Islands Economic Development Agency was given a $4.8 million Government grant. After an investigation the grant was later cancelled. He worked at the University of Auckland for fifteen years, running a Pacific student outreach programme.

Collins married Fia, a diversity and inclusion specialist, in 2011. The couple had two daughters together.

== Auckland Council ==
Auckland Council
Years	Ward	Affiliation
2016–2019	Manukau	Labour
2019–2022	Manukau	Labour

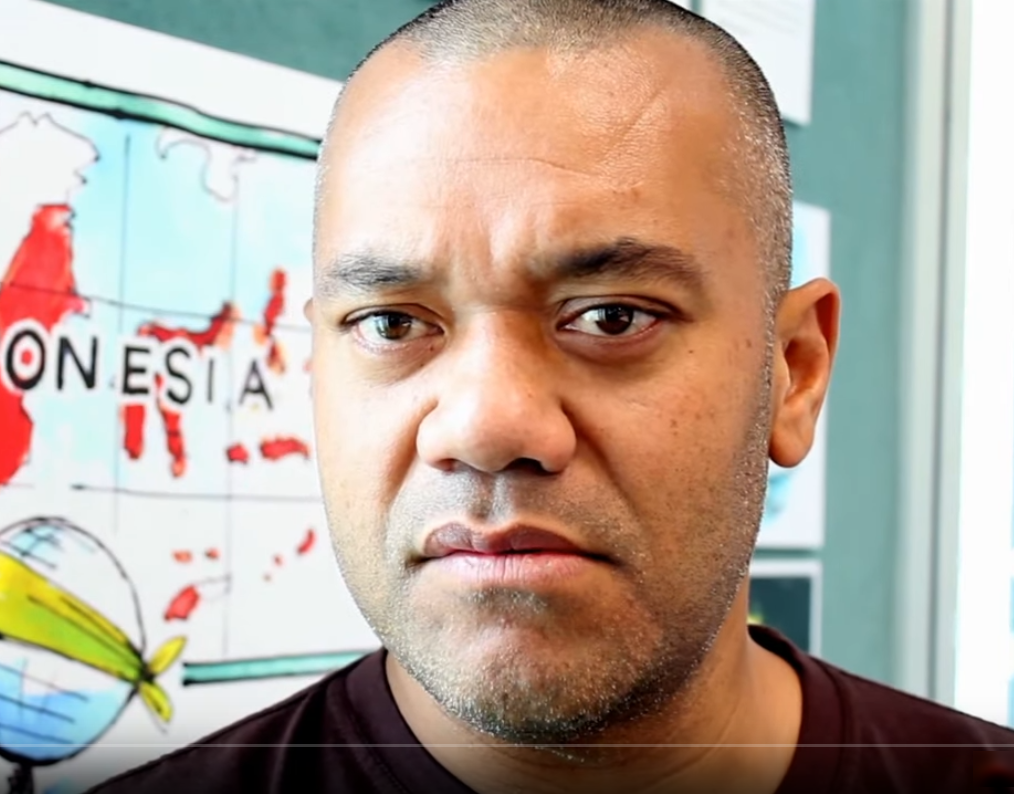
Collins in 2016

=== Papatoetoe Local Board, 2013–2016 ===
At the 2013 Auckland elections, Collins was elected to the Ōtara-Papatoetoe Local Board as a Labour Party candidate and became its chairperson. An unsolicited original campaign song, which sampled the 2008 single "Somebody" by Devolo and compared Collins to Barack Obama, was created for Collins by two former members of a church youth group he had previously led.

He contested the Labour Party candidate selection for the Manukau East electorate before the 2014 general election, but ultimately, Jenny Salesa was selected and won the seat.

=== Auckland Council, 2016–2022 ===
At the 2016 Auckland elections, Collins was elected to the Auckland Council, replacing Arthur Anae, who did not seek re-election. He was sworn in as a councillor for the Manukau ward on 1 November 2016. At Collins' inauguration, his family was turned away from the VIP seating area, which Collins said demonstrated systemic racism. During his first term, he was deputy chair of the community development and safety committee. Collins won the council's support to lobby the government to ban the sale of fireworks to the public, citing safety concerns.

In 2019 he was re-elected as the highest polling candidate in the Manukau ward. In his second term, he led the council's work on homelessness. Collins supported the council's goal that homelessness should be rare, brief and non-recurring. He also held the view that homelessness and anti-social public behaviour were distinct issues that should not be conflated.

On 27 August 2021, during the COVID-19 pandemic in New Zealand, Collins called for the New Zealand Government to grant an amnesty to people who had overstayed their visas in order to encourage members of the Pasifika community to come forward for COVID-19 tests. The then Health Minister Chris Hipkins had earlier reassured the Pasifika community that the Government would not use any information collected during testing for immigration purposes.

On 25 July 2021, Collins disclosed that he and his family had received a death threat on 19 June in response to his comments criticising TVNZ's Police Ten 7 programme for its negative depiction of the Māori and Pasifika communities. Despite the threats to him and his family, and the 'deep sense of guilt' he felt for exposing his family to the threat, Collins and his wife resolved to continue his involvement in politics and he later said this was the moment he decided to run for the Auckland mayoralty.

=== 2022 Auckland mayoral election ===
In January 2022 Collins announced he would be running for Mayor of Auckland as an independent candidate in the 2022 election. He received the endorsements of the Labour Party on 28 February 2022 and the Green Party on 15 March 2022, and also the endorsement of incumbent mayor Phil Goff. His campaign was officially launched in September 2022 by Māori development minister Willie Jackson and Auckland University of Technology law school dean Khylee Quince.

Collins' policies included fare-free public transport as "the first and best way" to address the city's emissions. During the campaign, Collins stated his support for the Labour government's proposed Three Waters infrastructure reforms and co-governance between iwi Māori and elected representatives, and opposed the sale of council assets including Auckland Airport.

Collins was regarded as the main centre-left mayoral candidate compared to an initially crowded field with three main centre-right candidates. In public opinion polling conducted from July through early September, he led eight other declared candidates but only saw a peak of 29% support. After Leo Molloy and Viv Beck withdrew, endorsing Wayne Brown, Collins' lead dissipated in two mid-September polls. In the October election, Collins received 124,802 votes (30.85%), compared to 181,810 votes for Brown, who was elected mayor. Collins attributed his election defeat to alleged "unconscious bias" among voters and the postal ballot system which disadvantaged lower-income voters.

== Member of Parliament ==
New Zealand Parliament
Years	Term	Electorate	List	Party
2023–2024	54th	List	11	Green

Following the 2022 Auckland mayoral election, Collins announced that he would retire from local body politics. When asked on election night, he stated he had no intention to run for Parliament at the 2023 New Zealand general election but in November it was reported that he was considering opportunities with the Labour Party and the Green Party.

Samoan dance at the reception after Collins had given his maiden speech; Collins at the far left

Collins was reported as a likely candidate for the Green Party in January 2023. In February 2023, Collins announced he was seeking selection as the Green candidate for Panmure-Ōtāhuhu and a place on the party list. The draft Green Party list released on 3 April featured Collins in 12th place. The finalised party list was released on 20 May 2023, featuring Collins up one place to 11th while also confirming him as the Green Party candidate for Panmure-Ōtāhuhu.

In mid-September 2023, Collins received a death threat during the 2023 election campaign. The Green Party referred the threat to the Police, who subsequently identified a 58-year-old man as the perpetrator. The man admitted fault and completed a Te Pae Oranga restorative justice process involving Police and Māori iwi (tribal) partners.

Collins came third in the Panmure-Ōtāhuhu electorate with 4,312 votes. However, he was elected to Parliament via the Green party list. Collins sat on the governance and administration committee and was appointed the Green Party spokesperson for ACC, commerce and consumer affairs, local government, Pacific Peoples, seniors, sport and recreation, Treaty of Waitangi negotiations, and veterans.

Collins delivered his maiden speech on 15 February 2024. In the speech, he addressed the theme of inequality and set out his perspectives that poverty is the driver of most societal challenges and the greatest challenge facing his generation is climate change. He criticised what he described as neoliberal economics' "farcical" creation of unemployment to stem inflation "when domestic inflation in New Zealand has been driven by big corporates making excessive profits." He also said he hoped his time in Parliament would inspire "the square pegs, the misfits, the forgotten, the unloved, the invisible."

Collins spoke in Parliament on only three other occasions, opposing the re-introduction of 90-day trials in most workplaces, speaking in support of a social worker registration scheme, and asking a question about the government's proposed Treaty Principles Bill. He died while in office, on 21 February 2024.

== Political views ==
Collins was historically aligned with the Labour Party, but veered from the party line on a number of occasions, such as opposing the Regional Fuel Tax on equity grounds, and being a vocal supporter of the 2019 Ihumātao protest.

His politics were generally centre-left, but he had held some conservative positions previously. He said these stemmed from his strict, Pentecostal religious upbringing. He was opposed to the Marriage (Definition of Marriage) Amendment Act 2013, which legalised same-sex marriage in New Zealand, but later apologised for his actions. Collins' niece came out as transgender in 2013, influencing him to move away from these views, despite some family members not supporting her transition. He later described himself as having abandoned the Christian theological position of "love the sinner, hate the sin."

On abortion, Collins said in 2022: "I won't get in the way of women and people who are pregnant making their own, deeply personal decisions. I too am on a journey of understanding and empathy and always open to listening to people's diverse experiences and beliefs."

During the 2020 New Zealand cannabis referendum, Collins opposed the legalisation of cannabis; however he supported its decriminalisation.

== Death ==
On 21 February 2024, Collins took part in a fun run in and around Commercial Bay and lower Queen Street, Auckland, as part of an event for charity ChildFund. ChildFund New Zealand chief executive Josie Pagani was a friend of Collins and had asked him to participate. Other participants included former professional boxer and fellow Samoan community advocate David Letele. The event, which involved running while carrying buckets of water, started at 8:00am in Te Komititanga square. According to Letele, the 49-year-old Collins appeared fit and healthy, and was laughing and joking throughout the race.

After the race, Collins collapsed outside Waitematā station shortly before 9:30am. Letele and a few others quickly noticed he was not breathing. Onsite paramedics rushed to Collins' aid, joined by firefighters and off-duty police officers. The area was cordoned off, and a black tent placed over the site. They worked to resuscitate Collins with defibrillators for 30 to 40 minutes. Despite their efforts, Collins was pronounced dead at roughly 10:00am, having suffered a cardiac arrest. Letele led race participants in prayers and waiata at the site.

=== Tributes ===
Less than an hour after Collins collapsed Green Party co-leader James Shaw expressed the caucus's "profound shock and sadness". Shaw continued that despite his long service in Auckland local government "in many ways Efeso's political career was only just beginning. He was such an authentic, genuine, warm man who had respect for everyone." Labour Party deputy leader Carmel Sepuloni said that while he had left "[Labour's] fale and moved into the Greens', he was only next door."

In a televised memorial service in the House of Representatives that afternoon, tributes also came from Labour Party leader and former Prime Minister Chris Hipkins, who had known Collins since 1999, as well as Prime Minister Christopher Luxon, Pacific Peoples minister Shane Reti, ACT leader David Seymour and Te Pāti Māori leader Debbie Ngarewa-Packer. New Zealand First leader Winston Peters, Labour MP Barbara Edmonds and former Prime Minister Helen Clark also submitted tributes via social media. In addition, tributes came from local government leaders and colleagues including Auckland businessman and mayoral candidate Leo Molloy, Auckland mayor Wayne Brown and deputy mayor Desley Simpson, Auckland councillor Richard Hills and Pasifika Medical Association chief executive Debbie Sorensen. Health leader Sir Collin Tukuitonga described Collins' death as "absolutely devastating for his family, for the Pasifika community, for NZ and beyond."

The House of Representatives then adjourned until 27 February. New Zealand flags on government buildings were flown at half-mast two days later to mark Collins' funeral. Collins was the first New Zealand MP to die in office since Labour MP Parekura Horomia, eleven years earlier.

A new mural celebrating his life was put on display in Manukau in 2025.

=== Funeral and memorial services ===
A memorial service for Collins was held at the Fale Pasifika of the University of Auckland on 28 February 2024.

Collins' funeral, held on 29 February at the Due Drop Events Centre in Manukau, was attended by his family, friends and colleagues. Political figures including Green Party co-leaders Marama Davidson and James Shaw, Prime Minister Christopher Luxon, Labour leader Chris Hipkins, Speaker of the House Gerry Brownlee, Mayor of Auckland Wayne Brown, and Te Pāti Māori co-leaders Debbie Ngarewa-Packer and Rawiri Waititi also attended. The funeral was livestreamed by Tipene Funerals. Scammers had promoted fake, paid livestreams on Facebook; victims who lost money included a church minister.

A second memorial debate acknowledging Collins' death was held in Parliament on 30 April 2024.

=== Inquest into death ===
In 2025, Collins' widow Fia called for an coronial inquest into her husband's death, concerned more could have been done to save him. The coroner stated there were uncertainties about where the defibrillator used on Collins came from and how long it took to be used, and said more information was needed about the circumstances of Collins' death.
