= Lotu Fuli =

New Zealand politician

Councillor Lotu Fuli
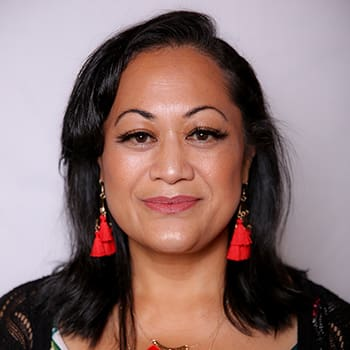

Manukau ward Councillor
- Incumbent
- Assumed office 2022 Serving with Alf Filipaina
- Preceded by: Efeso Collins

Personal details
- Party: Labour
- Scientific career
- Thesis: Definiteness vs. specificity : an investigation into the terms used to describe articles in Gagana Samoa (2007)

Lotu Fuli is a New Zealand politician who is an Auckland Councillor. In 2022, Fuli was elected as one of the two councillors for the Manukau ward.

== Early life ==
Lotu was born in Samoa and came to New Zealand with her family in the 1970s, originally living in Mount Eden. They moved to Ōtara in 1976 and she has lived there since. She graduated from the University of Auckland with a Master of Letters (M.Litt.) in 2007, with a thesis titled Definiteness vs. specificity: an investigation into the terms used to describe articles in Gagana Samoa. After spending time teaching secondary schools in Auckland, Japan, and South Korea, she returned to university to achieve a Bachelor of Laws with Honours.

== Political career ==
Auckland Council
Years	Ward	Affiliation
2022–present	Manukau	Labour

Fuli was elected to the Ōtara-Papatoetoe Local Board in 2013 Auckland local board elections. She was chairperson from 2016 to 2022.

On 15 June 2020, the New Zealand Labour Party published its list for the 2020 election, with Fuli placed 63rd. She was bumped up to 61st following the withdrawal of Raymond Huo and Iain Lees-Galloway. Her list placement was not high enough to elect Fuli.

In the 2022 local body elections, Fuli was elected as a councillor for the Manukau ward, a role formerly held by Efeso Collins, who ran for mayor.

Fuli ran for and won re-election as a councillor in the 2025 elections.
