= Manukau ward =

- Ward of Auckland
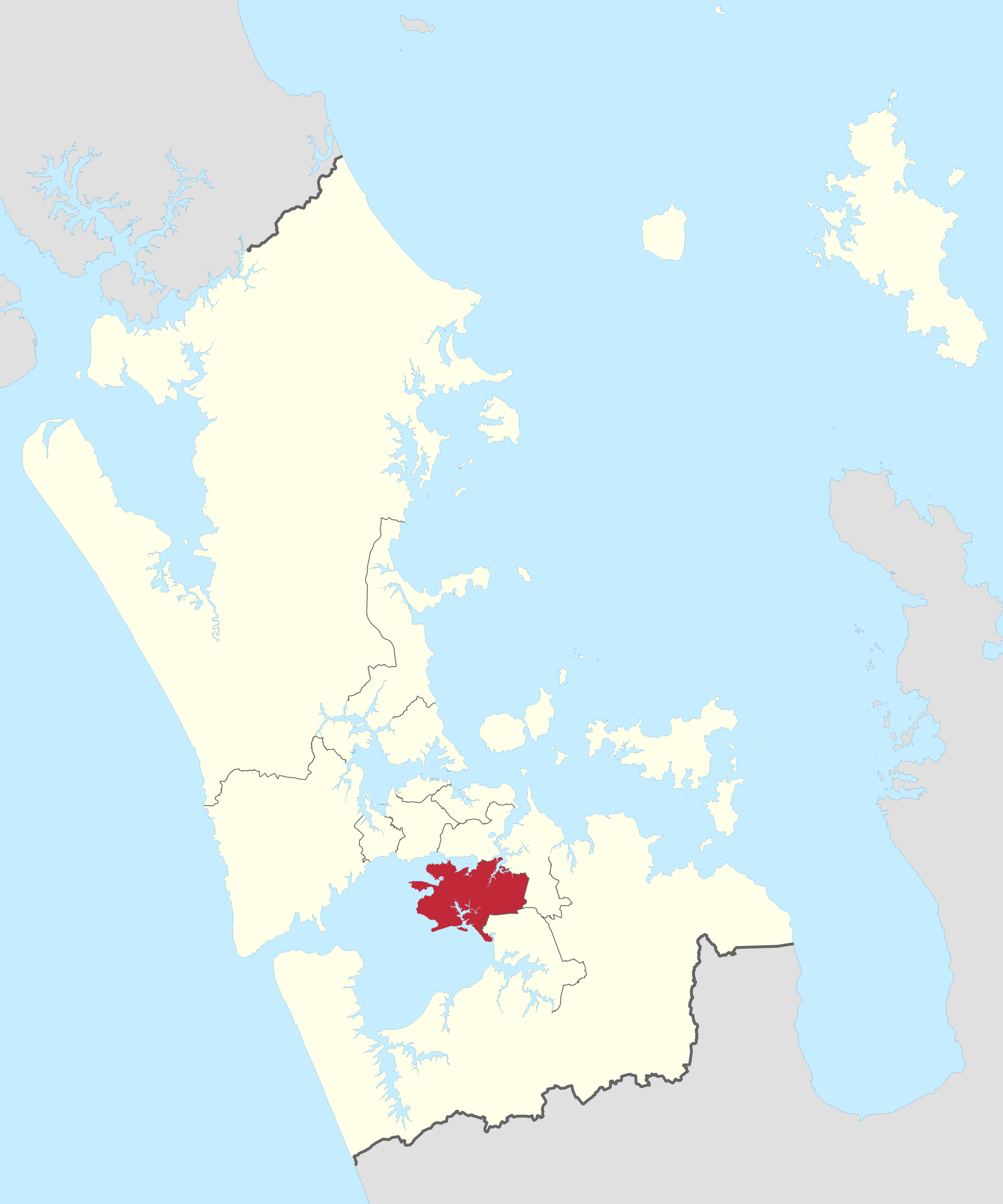
- Country: New Zealand
- Island: North Island
- Region: Auckland Region

Area
  - Land: 89.59 km^{2} (34.59 sq mi)

Population (June 2025)
  - Total: 184,800
  - Density: 2,063/km^{2} (5,342/sq mi)

The Manukau ward is an Auckland Council ward that elects two councillors and covers the Māngere-Ōtāhuhu and Ōtara-Papatoetoe Local Boards. The two councillors are currently Alf Filipaina and Lotu Fuli.

== Demographics ==
Manukau ward covers 89.59 km^{2} (34.59 sq mi) and had an estimated population of 184,800 as of June 2025, with a population density of 2,063 people per km^{2}.

Historical population
Year	Pop.	±% p.a.
2006	140,475	—
2013	146,619	+0.61%
2018	163,572	+2.21%
2023	165,594	+0.25%

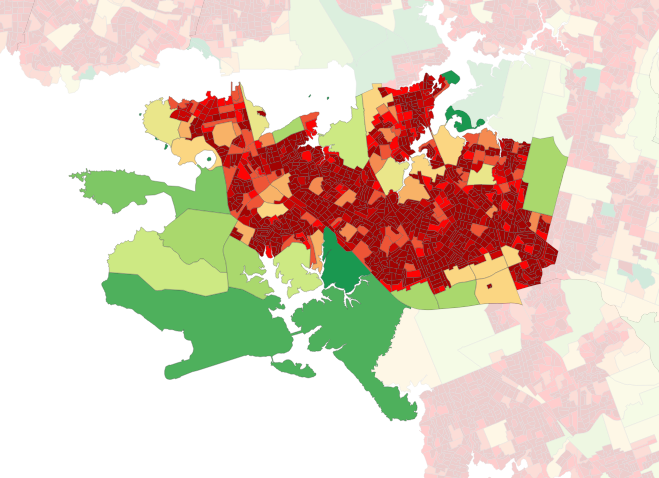
Population density in the 2023 census

Manukau ward had a population of 165,594 in the 2023 New Zealand census, an increase of 2,022 people (1.2%) since the 2018 census, and an increase of 18,975 people (12.9%) since the 2013 census. There were 82,485 males, 82,719 females and 390 people of other genders in 42,012 dwellings. 2.0% of people identified as LGBTIQ+. The median age was 31.0 years (compared with 38.1 years nationally). There were 39,207 people (23.7%) aged under 15 years, 40,650 (24.5%) aged 15 to 29, 70,527 (42.6%) aged 30 to 64, and 15,213 (9.2%) aged 65 or older.

People could identify as more than one ethnicity. The results were 16.4% European (Pākehā); 16.3% Māori; 54.3% Pasifika; 27.9% Asian; 1.0% Middle Eastern, Latin American and African New Zealanders (MELAA); and 0.7% other, which includes people giving their ethnicity as "New Zealander". English was spoken by 89.4%, Māori language by 4.2%, Samoan by 17.2%, and other languages by 28.7%. No language could be spoken by 3.0% (e.g. too young to talk). New Zealand Sign Language was known by 0.5%. The percentage of people born overseas was 43.4, compared with 28.8% nationally.

Religious affiliations were 51.8% Christian, 8.7% Hindu, 5.4% Islam, 1.6% Māori religious beliefs, 1.5% Buddhist, 0.1% New Age, and 3.9% other religions. People who answered that they had no religion were 20.5%, and 6.8% of people did not answer the census question.

Of those at least 15 years old, 18,519 (14.7%) people had a bachelor's or higher degree, 59,139 (46.8%) had a post-high school certificate or diploma, and 48,738 (38.6%) people exclusively held high school qualifications. The median income was $35,800, compared with $41,500 nationally. 6,195 people (4.9%) earned over $100,000 compared to 12.1% nationally. The employment status of those at least 15 was that 63,399 (50.2%) people were employed full-time, 11,250 (8.9%) were part-time, and 6,468 (5.1%) were unemployed.

== Councillors ==
Manukau Ward councillors of Auckland
- Incumbent; Alf Filipaina; Lotu Fuli
- Term length: Three years
- Inaugural holder: Alf Filipaina; Arthur Anae
- Formation: 1 November 2010
- Website: www.aucklandcouncil.govt.nz

Election		Councillors elected	Affiliation	Votes	Notes
2010	1	Alf Filipaina	Labour	15235	
2010	2	Arthur Anae	Independent	13260	
2013	1	Alf Filipaina	Labour	17441	
2013	2	Arthur Anae	Independent	12961	
2016	1	Alf Filipaina	Labour	17327	
2016	2	Fa'anana Efeso Collins	Labour	16500	
2019	1	Fa'anana Efeso Collins	Labour	19053	Stood down at 2022 Elections to run for Mayor
2019	2	Alf Filipaina	Labour	18814	
2022	1	Alf Filipaina	Labour	16,734	
2022	2	Lotu Fuli	Labour	14,935	Won seat formerly held by Efeso Collins
2025	1	Alf Filipaina	Labour		
2025	2	Lotu Fuli	Labour		

== Election results ==
Election results for the Manukau ward:

=== 2025 election results ===
Manukau ward
Affiliation	Candidate	Votes	%
Labour	Alf Filipaina^{†}	13,406	
Labour	Lotu Fuli^{†}	12,193	
Independent	Carol Ah-Voa	5,599	
Independent	Swanie Nelson	5,087	
Fix Auckland	Luke Mealamu	4,422	
Fix Auckland	Vicky Hau	4,301	
ACT Local	Henriette Devoe	3,328	
Independent	Christopher Hughes	2,116	
Communities and Residents	Malcolm Turner	2,065	
Informal		74	
Blank		784	
Turnout			
Registered		113,942	
Labour hold			
Labour hold			
^{†} incumbent

=== 2022 election results ===
	Name	Affiliation	Votes
1	Alf Filipaina	Labour	16734
2	Lotu Fuli	Labour	14935
	Malcolm Turner	Communities and Residents	8612
	Hine Afeaki	Outdoors & Freedom	5699
Blank			1345
Informal			27

=== 2016 election results ===
	Name	Affiliation	Votes	%
1	Alf Filipaina	Labour	17,327	31.8%
2	Efeso Collins	Labour	16,500	30.3%
	Brendan Corbett	Respect Our Community Campaign	7,738	14.2%
	Sooalo Setu Mua	Auckland Future	5,550	10.2%
	Ika Tameifuna	Auckland Future	5,304	9.7%
Blank			1,878	3.4%
Informal			164	0.3%
Turnout			54,461	
