= Arthur Anae =

New Zealand politician

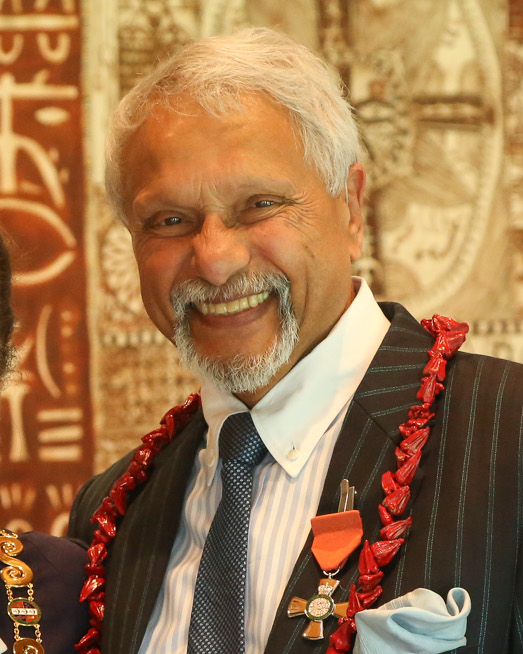
Anae in 2025

Anae Lupematasila Lima Arthur John Anae MNZM (born 1945) is a New Zealand politician who served on the Auckland Council. He was an MP from 1996 to 1999, and again from 2000 to 2002. He was part of the National Party, being its first Pasifika MP.

== Early life ==
Anae, who was born in 1945, is Samoan, although he was born in Fiji. His family migrated to New Zealand in 1951 when he was five years old.

== Member of Parliament ==
New Zealand Parliament
Years	Term	Electorate	List	Party
1996–1999	45th	List	19	National
2000–2002	46th	List	25	National

Anae first stood for Parliament in the 1993 election, when he contested the Auckland Central electorate; he came third on that occasion. He first entered Parliament in the 1996 election as a list MP (he did not contest an electorate), but after the 1999 election, missed returning to Parliament by a single place. When Don McKinnon resigned, however, Anae entered Parliament as his replacement. In the 2002 election, Anae was ranked lowly on the party list (in 28th place), could not win the Manukau East electorate (he came a distant second to Labour's Ross Robertson), and was thus not returned to Parliament. At the time, he was highly critical of the National Party for his low list ranking and perceived it as an insult to the Pacific community.

== Local politics ==
Auckland Council
Years	Ward	Affiliation
2010–2013	Manukau	Independent
2013–2016	Manukau	Independent

Anae first stood for Auckland City Council in the 1987 local elections. In October 2004 he was elected to the Manukau City Council from the Ōtara ward. He ran for the mayoralty of Manukau City in the 2007 local body elections, polling third.

In the 2010 Auckland Council election Anae was elected from the Manukau ward to serve in the newly formed Auckland Council and served as the chair of the council's economic forum. He was re-elected in 2013, but did not stand at the 2016 election, and opted to leave politics. His seat was won by Efeso Collins at the 2016 Auckland Council election.

== Advocacy ==
In mid-February 2026, Anae led a delegation presenting a 45,000-strong petition to the New Zealand Parliament urging the New Zealand Government to ease visa requirements for nationals from Pacific Islands countries. The delegation was received by Foreign Minister Winston Peters.

== Honours and awards ==
In the 2025 King’s Birthday Honours, Anae was appointed a Member of the New Zealand Order of Merit, for services to the Samoan community.
