= Putting People First =

Putting People First may refer to:

- Bill Clinton's Presidential campaign slogan, and the name of a campaign book co-authored by Clinton and Al Gore
- A UK government paper key to the Person Centred Planning approach.
- A minor political party with representation on Southampton City Council
- A minor local body ticket in Auckland, New Zealand
