= Alf Filipaina =

New Zealand politician

Councillor Alf Filipaina
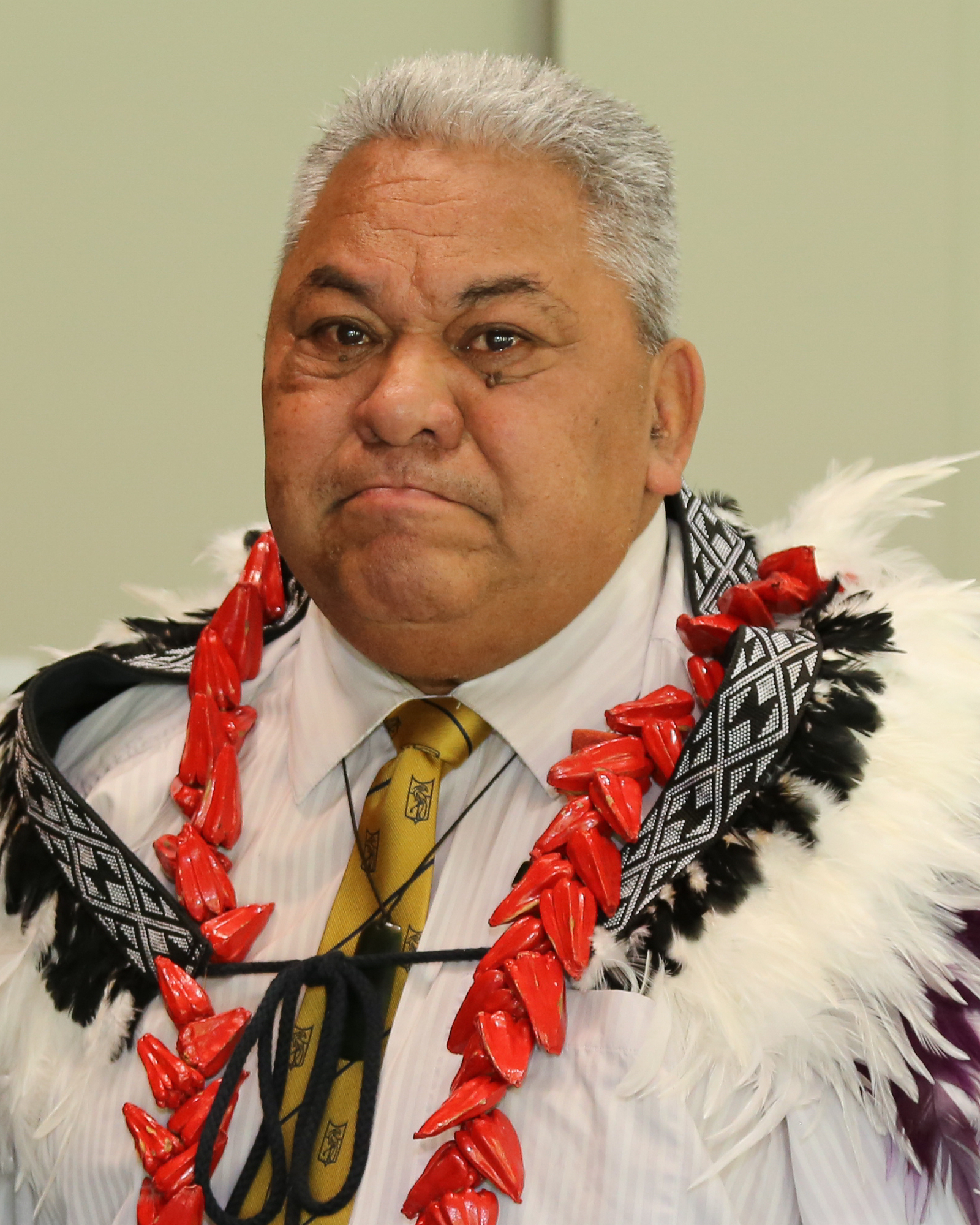
- Filipaina in 2022

Member of the Auckland Council
- Incumbent
- Assumed office October 2010
- Preceded by: Office created
- Constituency: Manukau ward

Personal details
- Party: Labour

Alfred Meredith Filipaina MNZM is a New Zealand politician who is an Auckland Councillor.

== Biography ==
From the mid-1980s until 1997, Filipaina worked as a community constable in Māngere Bridge.

=== Political career ===
Auckland Council
Years	Ward	Affiliation
2010–2013	Manukau	Labour
2013–2016	Manukau	Labour
2016–2019	Manukau	Labour
2019–2022	Manukau	Labour
2022–Present	Manukau	Labour

Filipaina was a Manukau City Councillor prior to the 'Super City' merger of Auckland's councils into Auckland Council in 2010.

In the inaugural 2010 Auckland Council elections Filipaina was elected from the Manukau ward. He was re-elected in 2013 and 2016. In 2016 the new mayor, Phil Goff, appointed him deputy chairperson of the environment and communities committee.

In the 2022 New Year Honours, Filipaina was appointed a Member of the New Zealand Order of Merit, for services to the New Zealand Police and the community.

In March 2025, Filipaina announced that he would not seek re-election as a councillor in the 2025 Auckland local elections, but would instead run for the Māngere-Ōtāhuhu Local Board. He had previously been speculated as a potential candidate for Mayor of Auckland. However, following the withdrawal of Tauanuʻu Nick Bakulich's candidacy for the Manukau ward, Filipaina announced that he would run for re-election to council after all. He won.

== Personal life ==
Filipaina's father was an overstayer, who narrowly avoided deportation during the dawn raids. One of Filipaina's brothers, Olsen, represented the New Zealand national rugby league team in rugby league. Another, Jerry, once stood for The Family Party in 2008.
