= Māngere-Ōtāhuhu Local Board =

Coordinates: 36.96961988°S 174.798875°E

Māngere-Ōtāhuhu Local Board Te Poari ā-Rohe o Māngere-Ōtāhuhu
- Local board of Auckland Council
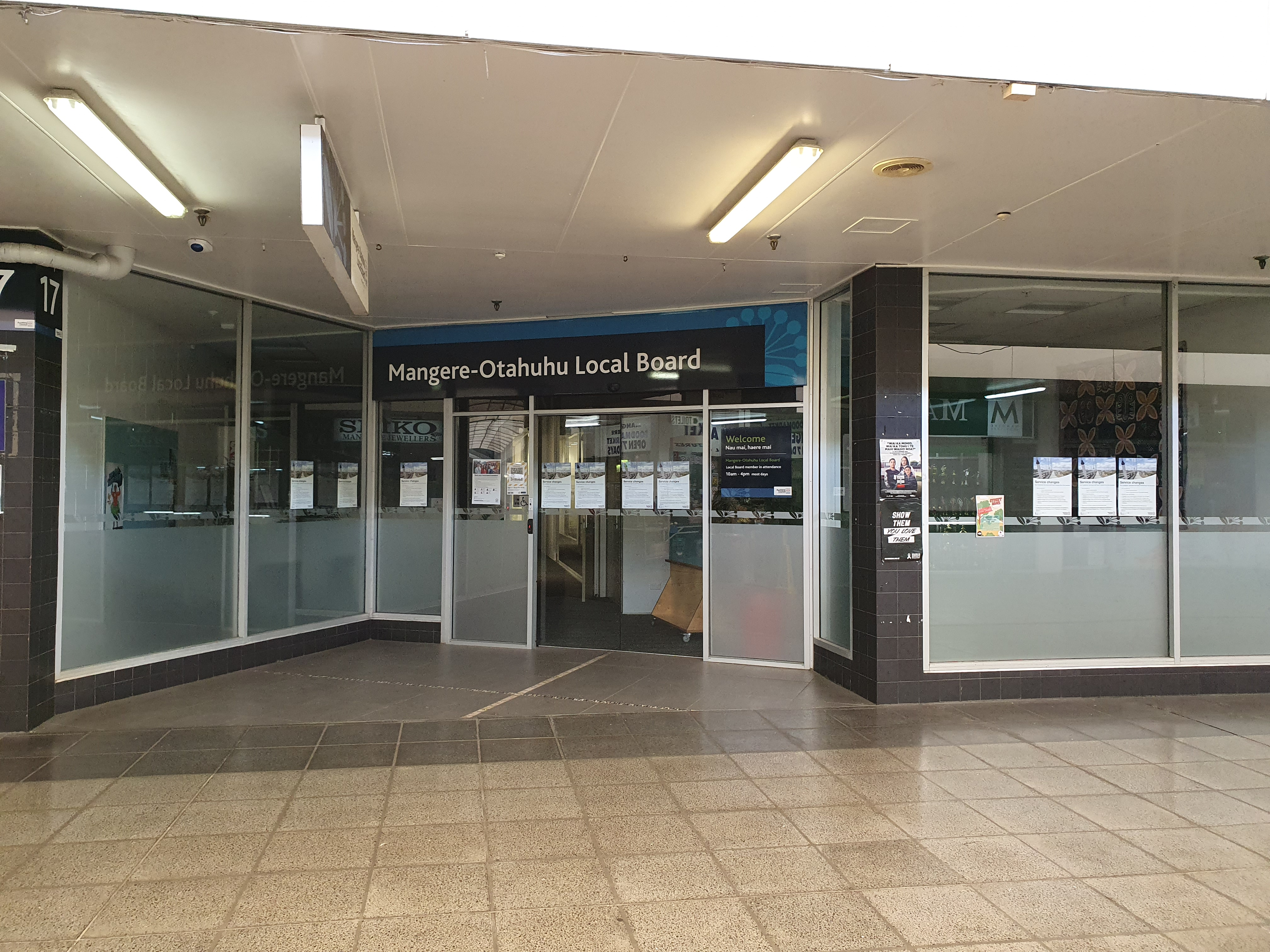
- Māngere-Ōtāhuhu Local Board offices in Māngere

- Country: New Zealand
- Region: Auckland
- Territorial authority: Auckland Council
- Ward: Manukau ward
- Legislated: 2010

Area
  - Land: 52.47 km^{2} (20.26 sq mi)

Population (June 2025)
  - Total: 85,900
  - Density: 1,640/km^{2} (4,240/sq mi)

Local Board Members

Leadership
- Chairperson: Kaea Walter Inoke-Togiamua, Labour
- Deputy chairperson: Christine O’Brien, Labour

Structure
- Seats: 7
- Political groups: Labour (7)
- Length of term: 3 years

Elections
- Last election: 2025
- Next election: 2028

Meeting place
- Shop 17, 93 Bader Drive, Māngere Town Centre, Māngere, Auckland

Māngere-Ōtāhuhu Local Board is one of the 21 local boards of the Auckland Council, and is overseen by the council's Manukau ward councillors. The board is governed by seven board members elected at-large. The board's administrative area includes the suburbs Māngere Bridge, Māngere, Ōtāhuhu, and Favona, and covers areas south of the Manukau Harbour.

== Geography ==
The area includes the suburbs of Māngere and Ōtāhuhu, and the neighbouring suburbs of Māngere East, Favona and Māngere Bridge.

== Demographics ==
Māngere-Ōtāhuhu Local Board Area covers 52.47 km^{2} (20.26 sq mi) and had an estimated population of 85,900 as of June 2025, with a population density of 1,637 people per km^{2}.

Historical population
Year	Pop.	±% p.a.
2006	68,154	—
2013	70,959	+0.58%
2018	78,450	+2.03%
2023	78,642	+0.05%

Māngere-Ōtāhuhu had a population of 78,642 in the 2023 New Zealand census, an increase of 192 people (0.2%) since the 2018 census, and an increase of 7,683 people (10.8%) since the 2013 census. There were 39,096 males, 39,351 females and 198 people of other genders in 19,632 dwellings. 2.1% of people identified as LGBTIQ+. The median age was 30.9 years (compared with 38.1 years nationally). There were 18,756 people (23.8%) aged under 15 years, 19,470 (24.8%) aged 15 to 29, 32,961 (41.9%) aged 30 to 64, and 7,455 (9.5%) aged 65 or older.

People could identify as more than one ethnicity. The results were 18.4% European (Pākehā); 16.9% Māori; 60.4% Pasifika; 19.6% Asian; 1.0% Middle Eastern, Latin American and African New Zealanders (MELAA); and 0.7% other, which includes people giving their ethnicity as "New Zealander". English was spoken by 90.3%, Māori language by 4.6%, Samoan by 18.3%, and other languages by 26.3%. No language could be spoken by 2.8% (e.g. too young to talk). New Zealand Sign Language was known by 0.5%. The percentage of people born overseas was 40.0, compared with 28.8% nationally.

Religious affiliations were 57.6% Christian, 5.1% Hindu, 5.5% Islam, 1.8% Māori religious beliefs, 1.2% Buddhist, 0.1% New Age, and 1.0% other religions. People who answered that they had no religion were 21.0%, and 7.0% of people did not answer the census question.

Of those at least 15 years old, 8,367 (14.0%) people had a bachelor's or higher degree, 28,827 (48.1%) had a post-high school certificate or diploma, and 22,692 (37.9%) people exclusively held high school qualifications. The median income was $34,700, compared with $41,500 nationally. 3,327 people (5.6%) earned over $100,000 compared to 12.1% nationally. The employment status of those at least 15 was that 29,541 (49.3%) people were employed full-time, 5,373 (9.0%) were part-time, and 3,132 (5.2%) were unemployed.

== 2025-2028 term ==
The current board members for the 2025-2028 term, elected at the 2025 local elections, are:

Name	Affiliation	Position
Kaea Walter Inoke-Togiamua	Labour	Chairperson
Christine O’Brien	Labour	Deputy Chairperson
Fe’etau Papaliitele Lafulafu Peo	Labour	Board member
Harry Fatu Toleafoa	Labour	Board member
Joe Glassie-Rasmussen	Labour	Board member
Makalita Kolo	Labour	Board member
Talei Solomon-Mua	Labour	Board member

== 2022-2025 term ==
The board members for the 2022-2025 term, elected at the 2022 local elections, were:

Name	Ticket (if any)	Position
Tauanu’u Nanai Nick Bakulich	Labour	Chairperson
Togiatolu Walter Togiamua	Labour	Deputy Chairperson
Makalita Kolo	Labour	Board member
Christine O’Brien	Labour	Board member
Harry Fatu Toleafoa	Labour	Board member
Papaliitele Lafulafu Peo	Labour	Board member
Joe Glassie-Rasmussen	Labour	Board member

== 2019–2022 term ==
The board members elected at the 2019 local body elections in October, were:

Tauanu'u Nick Bakulich, Labour – (8044 votes)
Christine O'Brien, Labour – (8015 votes)
Lemauga Lydia Sosene, Labour – (7982 votes)
Anae Neru Leavasa, Labour – (7870 votes) (Note: Resigned after being elected to Parliament at the 2020 election, and replaced in by-election by Papaliitele Lafulafu Peo.)
Walter Togiamua, Labour – (7797 votes)
Harry Fatu Toleafoa, Labour – (7784 votes)
Makalita Kolo, Labour – (6936 votes)

== 2016–19 term ==
The board members who served from the 2016 local body elections to the 2019 elections were:

Lemauga Lydia Sosene (Chair) - Labour
Togiatolu Walter Togiamua (Deputy Chair) - Labour
Carol Elliot - Labour
Makalita Kolo - Labour
Tafafuna'i Tasi Lauese - Labour
Christine O'Brien - Labour
Tauanu'u Nick Bakulich - Labour
