= Ōtara-Papatoetoe Local Board =

Ōtara-Papatoetoe Local Board Te Poari a Rohe o Ōtara-Papatoetoe
- Local board of Auckland Council
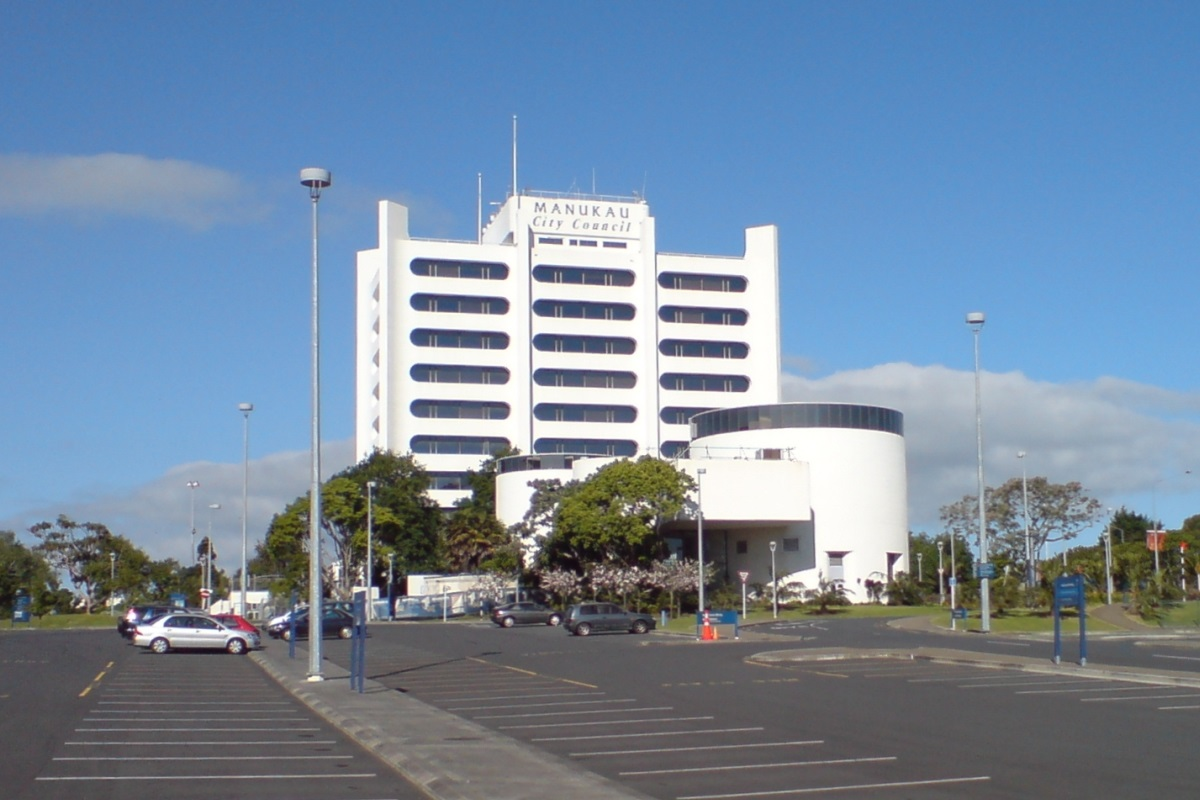
- The Ōtara-Papatoetoe Local Board Office in Manukau City Centre
- Interactive map of Ōtara-Papatoetoe Local Board
- Coordinates: 36.993336°S 174.880440°E
- Country: New Zealand
- Region: Auckland
- Territorial authority: Auckland Council
- Ward: Manukau ward
- Legislated: 2010

Area
  - Land: 37.12 km^{2} (14.33 sq mi)

Population (June 2025)
  - Total: 98,900
  - Density: 2,660/km^{2} (6,900/sq mi)

Local Board Members

Leadership
- Chairperson: Apulu Reece Autagavaia, Labour
- Deputy Chairperson: Vi Hausia, Labour

Structure
- Seats: 7
- Political groups: Labour (4); Papatoetoe Otara Action Team (3)
- Length of term: 3 years

Elections
- Last election: 2025
- Next election: 2028

Meeting place
- Level 1, Manukau Civic Building, Auckland Council, 31 Manukau Station Road, Manukau

The Ōtara-Papatoetoe Local Board is one of the 21 local boards of the Auckland Council. It is overseen by the Manukau ward councillors.

The local board area includes the suburbs of Ōtara, Papatoetoe, East Tāmaki, Puhinui and central Manukau.

== Geography ==
The area includes the suburbs of main suburbs of Ōtara and Papatoetoe, and the neighbouring suburbs of Manukau, Middlemore and Clover Park.

== Demographics ==
Ōtara-Papatoetoe Local Board Area covers 37.12 km^{2} (14.33 sq mi) and had an estimated population of 98,900 as of June 2025, with a population density of 2,664 people per km^{2}.

Historical population
Year	Pop.	±% p.a.
2006	72,324	—
2013	75,663	+0.65%
2018	85,122	+2.38%
2023	86,949	+0.43%

Ōtara-Papatoetoe had a population of 86,949 in the 2023 New Zealand census, an increase of 1,827 people (2.1%) since the 2018 census, and an increase of 11,286 people (14.9%) since the 2013 census. There were 43,389 males, 43,365 females and 195 people of other genders in 22,380 dwellings. 2.0% of people identified as LGBTIQ+. The median age was 31.1 years (compared with 38.1 years nationally). There were 20,448 people (23.5%) aged under 15 years, 21,177 (24.4%) aged 15 to 29, 37,566 (43.2%) aged 30 to 64, and 7,755 (8.9%) aged 65 or older.

People could identify as more than one ethnicity. The results were 14.6% European (Pākehā); 15.8% Māori; 48.7% Pasifika; 35.4% Asian; 1.0% Middle Eastern, Latin American and African New Zealanders (MELAA); and 0.8% other, which includes people giving their ethnicity as "New Zealander". English was spoken by 88.6%, Māori language by 3.8%, Samoan by 16.3%, and other languages by 30.9%. No language could be spoken by 3.1% (e.g. too young to talk). New Zealand Sign Language was known by 0.4%. The percentage of people born overseas was 46.5, compared with 28.8% nationally.

Religious affiliations were 46.6% Christian, 11.9% Hindu, 5.3% Islam, 1.5% Māori religious beliefs, 1.8% Buddhist, 0.1% New Age, and 6.5% other religions. People who answered that they had no religion were 20.0%, and 6.7% of people did not answer the census question.

Of those at least 15 years old, 10,149 (15.3%) people had a bachelor's or higher degree, 30,309 (45.6%) had a post-high school certificate or diploma, and 26,046 (39.2%) people exclusively held high school qualifications. The median income was $36,800, compared with $41,500 nationally. 2,868 people (4.3%) earned over $100,000 compared to 12.1% nationally. The employment status of those at least 15 was that 33,858 (50.9%) people were employed full-time, 5,877 (8.8%) were part-time, and 3,333 (5.0%) were unemployed.

== 2025-2028 term ==
Elections for the board members for the 2025-2025 term were held as part of the 2025 local elections.

Following this election, it was declared that all four seats for the Papatoetoe subdivision had been won by first-time candidates from the Papatoetoe Ōtara Action Team ticket, with none of the previous board members having won re-election. However, due to voting irregularities these results were voided in a hearing at the Manukau District Court on 16 December 2025, following a petition from former board member Lehopoame Vi Hausia. As such, elections were re-held to elect the board members for Papatoetoe, with voting opening on 9 March 2026.

The current board members are:

Name	Affiliation	Subdivision	Position
Apulu Reece Autagavaia	Labour	Ōtara	Chairperson
Vi Hausia	Labour	Papatoetoe	Deputy chairperson
Topou Folau	Labour	Ōtara	Board member
Li’amanaia Lorenzo Kaisara	Labour	Ōtara	Board member
Jeet Singh	Papatoetoe Otara Action Team	Papatoetoe	Board member
Sandeep Saini	Papatoetoe Otara Action Team	Papatoetoe	Board member
Kushma Nair	Papatoetoe Otara Action Team	Papatoetoe	Board member

Prior to the results of the 2025 election in the Papatoetoe subdivision being voided on 16 December 2025, Papatoetoe Otara Action Team board member Kushma Nair had been elected as board chair at the board's inaugural meeting on 4 November 2025, with Paramjeet Singh elected as deputy chair.

On 21 April 2026, at the board's first full meeting following the by-election, the board voted 4–3 to implement a rotating leadership model wherein former chair and Ōtara board member Apulu Reece Autagavaia would serve as the chair for the first half of the term while Papatoetoe board member Vi Hausia would take over for the second half. The pair will also rotate positions as deputy chairperson. Papatoetoe board member Kushma Nair had been nominated for both the chair and deputy chair positions, but was unsuccessful.

== 2022–2025 term ==
The board members elected at the 2022 local body elections were:

- Apulu Reece Autagavaia, Labour – (3662 votes)
- Ofa Dewes, Labour – (3267 votes)
- Albert Lim, INDEPENDENTLY PAPATOETOE – (3142 votes)
- Vi Hausia, Labour – (3117 votes)
- Swanie Nelson, Labour – (3106 votes)
- Ashraf Choudhary, Labour – (3079 votes)
- Topou Folau, (no affiliation) – (2152 votes)

Swanie Nelson resigned from the board in March 2023 causing a by-election in the Ōtara subdivision, which was won by Labour candidate Lorenzo Kaisara.

== 2019–2022 term ==
Board members, elected at the 2019 local body elections, are:

- Ross Robertson, Labour – (5443 votes)
- Dawn Trenberth, Labour – (4116 votes)
- Ofa Dewes, Labour – (3913 votes)
- Lotu Fuli, Labour – (3848 votes)
- Ashraf Choudhary, Labour – (3785 votes)
- Swanie Nelson, Labour – (3687 votes)
- Apulu Reece Autagavaia, Labour – (3613 votes)

== 2016–2019 term ==
The board members who served from the 2016 local body elections to the 2019 election were:

- Lotu Fuli (Chair)
- Ross Robertson (Deputy Chair)
- Apulu Reece Autagavaia
- Mary Gush
- Donna Lee
- Dawn Trenberth
- Ashraf Choudhary
