= 2023 New Zealand census =

Thirty-fifth national census of New Zealand

Thirty-fifth census of New Zealand
- 7 March 2023; 2 years ago

General information
- Country: New Zealand
- Website: stats.gov.nz (2023)

Results
- Total population: 4,993,923 (6.26%▲)
- Most populous region: Auckland (1,656,486)
- Least populous region: West Coast (33,390)

The 2023 New Zealand census, which took place on 7 March 2023, was the thirty-fifth national census in New Zealand. It implemented measures that aimed to increase the Census' effectiveness in response to the issues faced with the 2018 census, including supporting Māori to complete the census. It also included new questions on topics such as gender, sexual identity, and disabilities/health conditions. The population of New Zealand was counted as 4,993,923 – an increase of (6.26%) over the 2018 census.

The first Census data was published on 29 May 2024, in a range of data products and services.

== Conducting the census ==
The 2023 census can be completed online or on paper forms. Forms with an access code were mailed out to householders from 20 February, but paper forms could be requested online or by telephone. The telephone number had operators speaking English, te reo Māori, Samoan, Tongan, Korean, Mandarin, Cantonese, Hindi, and Punjabi. New Zealand Sign Language was available through NZ Relay. One dwelling form was required for each household, and one individual form was required for each person present in the dwelling on Tuesday 7 March 2023. The census closed on 30 June 2023.

== History ==
=== Background ===
The first full census in New Zealand was conducted in 1851, and the census was triennial until 1881, at which time it became five-yearly. The 1931 census was cancelled due to the effects of the Great Depression, as was the 1941 census due to World War II. The 1946 census was brought forward to Tuesday 25 September 1945, so that the results could be used for an electoral redistribution (the first for ten years) before the 1946 election.

1951 was the first year in which Māori and European New Zealanders were treated equally, with European New Zealanders having had a different census form in previous years and separate censuses in the nineteenth century. Results for those censuses before 1966 have been destroyed with a few exceptions and those since will not be available before 2066.

The 2006 census was held on Tuesday, 7 March. For the first time, respondents had the option of completing their census form online rather than by a printed form.

The 2011 census was scheduled for Tuesday, 8 March. However, due to the Christchurch earthquake on 22 February 2011, it was cancelled. For the first time ever, all 2011 census forms would have been digitally archived. On 27 May 2011 Statistics New Zealand announced that a census would take place in March 2013. The legislation required to change the census date was introduced to Parliament in August 2011.

The 2013 census was held on Tuesday 5 March 2013 and the 2018 census was held on Tuesday 6 March 2018. The 2018 census faced wide criticism for low response rates, a poor rollout of the online component of the census and delays. This resulted in an independent review of the census process, and the resignation of the then-Chief Executive of Statistics New Zealand Liz MacPherson.

The date for the 2023 New Zealand census was announced by Stats NZ on 28 September 2022.

=== Issues ===
==== Cyclone Gabrielle ====
In February 2023, Cyclone Gabrielle had devastated parts of the North Island, prompting the Government to declare a national state of emergency in six regions. To address the disruption caused by Cyclone Gabrielle, the Government had agreed to an eight-week extension of the census for the worst affected areas. People living in cyclone-affected areas including the Far North District, Gisborne District, and Hawkes Bay had until 1 June to complete their Census.

In addition, Statistics New Zealand asked the Government for an extra NZ$37 million to cover extra costs. Face-to-face visits were also delayed in some affected areas. Field operations in Gisborne and Hawkes Bay commenced on 3 April.

==== Participation rates ====
On 6 March 2023, Radio New Zealand reported that just one million New Zealanders had filled out their census forms. Statistics New Zealand's deputy chief executive census and collections operation, Simon Mason, described the response as underwhelming and attributed the lower response rate to the disruption caused by Cyclone Gabrielle and opposition by some on social media to participating in the census. In response to criticism of the 2018 New Zealand census, Mason confirmed that Statistics NZ had sent two forms in the post to bolster public engagement.

By 31 March, Statistics NZ had confirmed that four million people had returned their census forms; beating the 30 April milestone for the 2018 census. On 5 April, Newsroom reported that one in five people had not returned their census forms, with the figure rising to two in five people within the Māori and Pacific communities. Newsroom also reported low rates of participation in Gisborne and Hawkes Bay; with 26,200 out of Gisborne's estimated total population of 52,100 and 89,300 out of Hawkes Bay's population of 182,700 returning their survey forms.

According to Newsroom, Statistics NZ had fallen behind its target of visiting all non-responding and partially responding households by nine days after 7 March. By 31 March, 29,000 dwellings outside Te Mana Whakatipu, Gisborne, and Hawkes Bay had not received their first visit. Mason also confirmed that census workers had made 1.3 million non-response follow-up visits to 790,000 dwellings by 31 March. In an effort to boost participation, Statistics NZ deployed over 3,000 census collectors in the community until 3 May and until 1 June in Hawkes Bay and Gisborne. Mason also confirmed that Statistics NZ would focus on supporting under-represented groups including Māori.

By 20 April, Statistics NZ confirmed that 4.3 million people had returned their census forms while one in five respondents had not returned their forms. The Bay of Plenty Times reported that 274,300 had returned their forms by 19 April. However, 73,400 forms had not been returned; with 37,300 of these non-respondents being Māori and 17,700 being youths. Non-respondents face a NZ$2,000 fine under the Data and Statistics Act 2022.

By 1 May, Statistics NZ confirmed that 4,408,894 people out of an estimated population of 5.15 million had returned their census forms. Statistics NZ spokesperson Tracy Dillimore confirmed that the national Census response rate was 86%. Deputy government statistician Simon Mason warned that people who had not completed their census forms would receive a final notice from 9 May.

National Party statistics spokesperson Simon Watts described the 2023 Census as a failure and doubted that Statistics NZ would reach its 90% target. Watts also disputed Statistic NZ's position that Cyclone Gabrielle had disrupted the census collection process, pointing out that most of the uncompleted forms were from major cities with lower completion rates among Māori and Pasifika. Watts estimated that the 2023 Census would cost NZ$337 million, including the extra NZ$37 million requested by Statistics NZ. By contrast, the Minister of Statistics Deborah Russell claimed that the 2023 Census was an improvement over the 2018 Census, citing the former's 86% response rate in comparison with the latter's overall response rate of 81.6%.

By 20 May, 4.5 million census forms (covering 88% of the population) had been returned. According to Deputy Government Statistician Simon Mason, 55,000 final notice packs had been sent to non-responding households. At the time, 25% of Māori and Pasifika had not returned their census forms. During the 2023 census, Te Whānau-ā-Apanui trialled a "by Māori, for Māori" census collection drive in East Cape, Gisborne District and parts of the Northland Region. Data Iwi Leaders Forum spokesperson Rahui Papa credited the "by Māori, for Māori" drive with ensuring a 90% Māori uptake in the East Cape.

==== Misuse of census data allegations ====
On 2 June 2024, the Sunday Star Times reported that Statistics New Zealand was investigating allegations by former staff at Manurewa Marae that Te Pāti Māori (Māori Party) had illegally used 2023 census data to target Māori electorate voters in the Tāmaki Makaurau electorate during the 2023 New Zealand general election, and that participants were given supermarket vouchers, wellness packs and food parcels to encourage them to fill out census forms and switch to the Māori electoral roll. The party's candidate Takutai Tarsh Kemp had won the Tāmakai Makaurau seat during the 2023 election. A whistleblower from the Ministry of Social Development had alerted Statistics NZ and the Police, which had delayed investigating the matter. In response, Te Pāti Māori leader John Tamihere denied the allegations and claimed they were made by disgruntled former staff. Tamihere said that the marae had been working with the Whānau Ora Commissioning Agency to promote Māori participation in the 2023 census. Tamihere also acknowledged that marae workers had given gifts to encourage people to participate in the 2023 Census and switch to the Māori roll.

Prime Minister Christopher Luxon said the allegations are "pretty serious" and they need to be investigated promptly but were an issue for the party and the authorities. David Seymour said a ministerial inquiry could be warranted and Leader of the Opposition Chris Hipkins said the allegations were "very serious" and warranted a "rigorous and very credible" review. Doug Craig was appointed to investigate the census data misuse allegations. The findings will be shared with the New Zealand Police who are also investigating.

On 27 August 2024, former academic Rawiri Taonui claimed that the whistleblowers connected to Destiny Church had instigated the allegations against Manurewa Marae and Te Pāti Māori following a failed attempt by the church to take over the marae. On 22 January 2025, Statistics New Zealand's investigation cleared the Whanau Ora Commissioning Agency of data breaches during the 2023 Census, finding that the agency increased Māori participation. The report made nine recommendations to improve Statistics NZ's procedures and referred allegations against Manurewa Marae to the Privacy Commissioner. The report also found no evidence that one of the alleged whistleblowers had attempted to contact Statistics NZ regarding allegations against the marae.

On 11 February 2025, The New Zealand Herald reported that Detective Superintendent Ross McKay was leading an investigation into allegations regarding Te Pāti Māori's misuse of census data and Covid-19 vaccination information at Manurewa Marae during the 2023 general election.

== Results ==
The first results from the census were released on 29 May 2024.

=== Population counts ===
Region	Population				Change		
Region	2018 census	%	2023 census	%	Change	%	pp
Northland	179,076	3.81	194,007	3.88	▲14,931	▲8.34	▲0.07
Auckland	1,571,718	33.44	1,656,486	33.17	▲84,768	▲5.39	▼0.27
Waikato	458,202	9.75	498,771	9.99	▲40,569	▲8.85	▲0.24
Bay of Plenty	308,499	6.56	334,140	6.69	▲25,641	▲8.31	▲0.13
Gisborne	47,517	1.01	51,135	1.02	▲3,618	▲7.61	▲0.01
Hawke's Bay	166,368	3.54	175,074	3.51	▲8,706	▲5.23	▼0.03
Taranaki	117,561	2.50	126,015	2.52	▲8,454	▲7.19	▲0.02
Manawatū-Whanganui	238,797	5.08	251,412	5.03	▲12,615	▲5.28	▼0.05
Wellington	506,814	10.78	520,971	10.43	▲14,157	▲2.79	▼0.35
North Island	3,594,552	76.48	3,808,005	76.25	▲213,453	▲5.94	▼0.23
Tasman	52,389	1.11	57,807	1.16	▲5,418	▲10.34	▲0.04
Nelson	50,880	1.08	52,584	1.05	▲1,704	▲3.35	▼0.03
Marlborough	47,340	1.01	49,431	0.99	▲2,091	▲4.42	▼0.02
West Coast	31,575	0.67	33,390	0.67	▲1,851	▲5.75	0.00
Canterbury	599,694	12.76	651,027	13.04	▲51,333	▲8.56	▲0.28
Otago	225,186	4.79	240,900	4.82	▲15,714	▲6.98	▲0.03
Southland	97,467	2.07	100,143	2.01	▲2,676	▲2.75	▼0.07
South Island	1,104,537	23.50	1,185,282	23.73	▲100,140	▲7.31	▲0.23
Area outside region	669	0.01	633	0.01	▼36	▼5.38	0.00
New Zealand	4,699,755	100.00	4,993,923	100.00	▲294,168	▲6.26	

==== Population counts by territorial authority and Auckland local board areas ====
Territorial authority or Auckland local board	Population		Change	
Territorial authority or Auckland local board	2018 census	2023 census	Change	%
Far North district	65,250	71,430	▲6,180	▲9.5
Whangarei district	90,960	96,678	▲5,718	▲6.3
Kaipara district	22,869	25,899	▲3,030	▲13.2
Auckland	1,571,718	1,656,486	▲84,768	▲5.4
Auckland – Rodney local board area	66,417	77,949	▲11,532	▲17.4
Auckland – Hibiscus and Bays local board area	104,010	114,033	▲10,023	▲9.6
Auckland – Upper Harbour local board area	62,841	76,959	▲14,118	▲22.5
Auckland – Kaipātiki local board area	88,269	88,128	▼141	▼0.2
Auckland – Devonport-Takapuna local board area	57,975	58,005	▲30	▲0.1
Auckland – Henderson-Massey local board area	118,422	124,779	▲6,357	▲5.4
Auckland – Waitākere Ranges local board area	52,095	53,898	▲1,803	▲3.5
Auckland – Aotea/Great Barrier local board area	936	1,251	▲315	▲33.7
Auckland – Waiheke local board area	9,063	9,162	▲99	▲1.1
Auckland – Waitematā local board area	82,866	81,546	▼1,320	▼1.6
Auckland – Whau local board area	79,356	81,273	▲1,917	▲2.4
Auckland – Albert-Eden local board area	98,622	96,630	▼1,992	▼2.0
Auckland – Puketāpapa local board area	57,555	56,949	▼606	▼1.1
Auckland – Ōrākei local board area	84,318	83,196	▼1,122	▼1.3
Auckland – Maungakiekie-Tāmaki local board area	76,284	78,102	▲1,818	▲2.4
Auckland – Howick local board area	140,970	153,570	▲12,600	▲8.9
Auckland – Māngere-Ōtāhuhu local board area	78,120	78,642	▲192	▲0.2
Auckland – Ōtara-Papatoetoe local board area	85,122	86,949	▲1,827	▲2.1
Auckland – Manurewa local board area	95,670	98,784	▲3,114	▲3.3
Auckland – Papakura local board area	57,636	72,318	▲14,682	▲25.5
Auckland – Franklin local board area	74,838	84,357	▲9,519	▲12.7
Thames-Coromandel district	29,892	31,995	▲2,100	▲7.0
Hauraki district	20,022	21,318	▲1,296	▲6.5
Waikato district	75,618	85,698	▲10,350	▲13.7
Matamata-Piako district	34,404	37,098	▲2,694	▲7.8
Hamilton city	160,911	174,741	▲13,830	▲8.6
Waipa district	53,241	58,686	▲5,445	▲10.2
Ōtorohanga district	10,104	10,410	▲306	▲3.0
South Waikato district	24,042	25,044	▲1,002	▲4.2
Waitomo district	9,303	9,585	▲282	▲3.0
Taupo district	37,203	40,296	▲3,093	▲8.3
Western Bay of Plenty district	50,904	56,184	▲5,280	▲10.4
Tauranga city	137,130	152,844	▲15,714	▲11.5
Rotorua district	71,877	74,058	▲2,181	▲3.0
Whakatane district	35,700	37,149	▲1,449	▲4.1
Kawerau district	7,146	7,539	▲393	▲5.5
Ōpōtiki district	9,276	10,089	▲813	▲8.8
Gisborne district	47,517	51,135	▲3,618	▲7.6
Wairoa district	8,367	8,826	▲459	▲5.5
Hastings district	81,537	85,965	▲4,428	▲5.4
Napier city	62,241	64,695	▲2,454	▲3.9
Central Hawke's Bay district	14,142	15,480	▲1,338	▲9.5
New Plymouth district	80,679	87,000	▲6,321	▲7.8
Stratford district	9,474	10,149	▲675	▲7.1
South Taranaki district	27,534	29,025	▲1,491	▲5.4
Ruapehu district	12,309	13,095	▲786	▲6.4
Whanganui district	45,309	47,619	▲2,310	▲5.1
Rangitikei district	15,027	15,663	▲636	▲4.2
Manawatu district	30,165	32,415	▲2,250	▲7.5
Palmerston North city	84,639	87,090	▲2,451	▲2.9
Tararua district	17,943	18,660	▲717	▲4.0
Horowhenua district	33,261	36,693	▲3,432	▲10.3
Kapiti Coast district	53,673	55,914	▲2,241	▲4.2
Porirua city	56,559	59,445	▲2,886	▲5.1
Upper Hutt city	43,980	45,759	▲1,779	▲4.0
Lower Hutt city	104,532	107,562	▲3,030	▲2.9
Wellington city	202,737	202,689	▼48	0.0
Masterton district	25,557	27,678	▲2,121	▲8.3
Carterton district	9,198	10,107	▲909	▲9.9
South Wairarapa district	10,575	11,811	▲1,236	▲11.7
Tasman district	52,389	57,807	▲5,418	▲10.3
Nelson city	50,880	52,584	▲1,704	▲3.3
Marlborough district	47,340	49,431	▲2,091	▲4.4
Kaikoura district	3,912	4,215	▲303	▲7.7
Buller district	9,591	10,446	▲855	▲8.9
Grey district	13,344	14,043	▲699	▲5.2
Westland district	8,640	8,901	▲261	▲3.0
Hurunui district	12,558	13,608	▲1,050	▲8.4
Waimakariri district	59,502	66,246	▲6,744	▲11.3
Christchurch city	369,006	391,383	▲22,377	▲6.1
Selwyn district	60,561	78,144	▲17,583	▲29.0
Ashburton district	33,423	34,746	▲1,323	▲4.0
Timaru district	46,296	47,547	▲1,251	▲2.7
Mackenzie district	4,866	5,115	▲249	▲5.1
Waimate district	7,815	8,121	▲306	▲3.9
Chatham Islands territory	663	612	▼51	▼7.7
Waitaki district	22,308	23,472	▲1,164	▲5.2
Central Otago district	21,558	24,306	▲2,748	▲12.7
Queenstown-Lakes district	39,153	47,808	▲8,655	▲22.1
Dunedin city	126,255	128,901	▲2,646	▲2.1
Clutha district	17,667	18,315	▲648	▲3.7
Southland district	30,864	31,833	▲969	▲3.1
Gore district	12,396	12,711	▲315	▲2.5
Invercargill city	54,204	55,599	▲1,395	▲2.6
Area outside territorial authority	39	72	▲33	▲84.6
Total people	4,699,755	4,993,923	▲294,168	▲6.3

=== Ethnic group ===
Ethnic group	Population				Change		
Ethnic group	2018 census	%	2023 census	%	Change	%	pp
European	3,297,864	70.17	3,383,742	67.76	▲85,878	▲2.60	▼2.41
Māori	775,836	16.51	887,493	17.77	▲111,657	▲14.39	▲1.26
Asian	707,598	15.06	861,576	17.25	▲153,978	▲21.76	▲2.20
Pacific peoples	381,642	8.12	442,632	8.86	▲60,990	▲15.98	▲0.74
Middle Eastern/Latin American/African	70,332	1.50	92,760	1.86	▲22,428	▲31.89	▲0.36
Other ethnicity	58,053	1.24	56,133	1.12	▼1,920	▼3.31	▼0.11
Total people	4,699,755	100.00	4,993,923	100.00	▲294,168	▲6.26	

Many respondents identify with multiple ancestries. Outputting data on multiple ethnicities is normally handled one of two ways: total response or prioritised ethnicity. For this list, the total response method is used.

Total response counts people of multiple ethnicities in each ethnic groups in which they identify. While this shows all the people that identify with a particular ethnicities, the sum of all ethnic group populations adds to more than the total population. For example, a person who identifies as New Zealand European and Māori would be counted twice, once under each ethnicity, under total response output.

Prioritised ethnicity counts people with multiple ethnicities in the highest-priority single ethnic group in which they identify. The order of priority for ethnicity, from highest to lowest, is Māori, Pacific peoples, Asian, MELAA, other and European. While it has the advantage that the sum of all ethnic groups equals the total population, the preferential order can cause ethnic groups to be overrepresented or underrepresented, and may categorise a person differently from their self-identified primary ethnicity. For example, a person who identifies as New Zealand European and Māori would be counted under the Māori ethnic group under prioritised ethnicity output.

Comparison of different methods of handling multiple ethnicites, 2023 census data
Ethnic group	Single/combination		Total response		Prioritised	
Ethnic group	Number	%	Number	%	Number	%
European	2,790,354	55.9	3,383,742	67.8	2,790,354	55.9
Māori	366,015	7.3	887,493	17.8	887,493	17.8
Pacific peoples	277,002	5.5	442,632	8.9	348,957	7.0
Asian	782,646	15.7	861,576	17.3	831,402	16.6
Middle Eastern/Latin American/African	72,588	1.5	92,760	1.9	85,986	1.7
Other	44,763	0.9	56,133	1.1	49,623	1.0
European–Māori	409,401	8.2				
European–Pacific	58,215	1.2				
European–Asian	44,142	0.9				
Māori–Pacific	44,796	0.9				
Two ethnic groups, not elsewhere included	37,446	0.7				
European–Māori–Pacific	43,908	0.9				
Three ethnic groups, not elsewhere included	19,401	0.4				
Four or more ethnic groups	3,234	0.1			3,234	0.1
Total responses	4,993,923	100.0	5,724,336	114.6	4,993,923	100.0
Total population	4,993,923	100.0	4,993,923	100.0	4,993,923	100.0

=== Age ===
The median age was 38.1 years, up from 37.4 years at the 2018 census.

Age group	Cohort	Population		Age group change		Cohort change	
Age group	Cohort	2018 census	2023 census	Change	%	Change	%
0–4	2018–23	294,921	288,387	▼6,534	▼2.2	▲288,387	▲100.0
5–9	2013–18	322,632	311,736	▼10,899	▼3.4	▲16,815	▲5.7
10–14	2008–13	305,847	336,174	▲30,327	▲9.9	▲13,542	▲4.2
15–19	2003–08	301,821	320,637	▲18,813	▲6.2	▲14,790	▲4.8
20–24	1998–2003	317,400	311,952	▼5,451	▼1.7	▲10,131	▲3.4
25–29	1993–98	344,466	335,715	▼8,748	▼2.5	▲18,315	▲5.8
30–34	1988–93	317,034	374,079	▲57,042	▲18.0	▲29,613	▲8.6
35–39	1983–88	295,395	345,537	▲50,142	▲17.0	▲28,503	▲9.0
40–44	1978–83	291,345	315,765	▲24,417	▲8.4	▲20,370	▲6.9
45–49	1973–78	321,483	302,220	▼19,263	▼6.0	▲10,875	▲3.7
50–54	1968–73	308,589	322,635	▲14,043	▲4.6	▲1,152	▲0.4
55–59	1963–68	302,759	304,074	▲1,329	▲0.4	▼4,515	▼1.5
60–64	1958–63	260,901	296,418	▲35,517	▲13.6	▼6,341	▼2.1
65–69	1953–58	229,032	252,492	▲23,460	▲10.2	▼8,409	▼3.2
70–74	1948–53	183,636	213,438	▲29,805	▲16.2	▼15,594	▼6.8
75–79	1943–48	132,792	163,932	▲30,840	▲23.2	▼19,704	▼10.9
80–84	1938–43	85,362	107,991	▲22,629	▲26.5	▼24,801	▼18.7
85–89	1933–38	53,979	57,939	▲3,960	▲7.3	▼27,423	▼32.1
90+	−1933	30,372	33,093	▲2,721	▲9.0	▼51,258	▼60.8
0–14	2008–23	923,403	936,297	▲12,894	▲1.4		
15–29	1993–2008	963,690	968,304	▲4,614	▲0.5		
30–64	1958–93	2,097,501	2,260,728	▲163,227	▲7.8		
65+	−1958	715,170	828,585	▲113,415	▲15.9		
Total people		4,699,755	4,993,923	▲294,168	▲6.3		

=== Māori descent ===
Māori descent indicator	Population				Change		
Māori descent indicator	2018 census	%	2023 census	%	Change	%	pp
Māori descent	869,850	18.51	978,246	19.59	▲108,396	▲12.46	▲1.08
No Māori descent	3,715,050	79.05	3,873,726	77.57	▲158,676	▲4.27	▼1.48
Don't know	114,855	2.44	141,951	2.84	▲27,096	▲23.59	▲0.40
Total	4,699,755	100.00	4,993,923	100.00	▲294,168	▲6.3	

=== Dwelling counts ===
Region	Dwellings		Change	
Region	2018 census	2023 census	Change	%
Northland	80,958	88,092	▲7,134	▲8.8
Auckland	547,059	611,895	▲64,836	▲11.9
Waikato	198,291	216,222	▲17,931	▲9.0
Bay of Plenty	127,812	137,349	▲9,537	▲7.5
Gisborne	18,684	19,509	▲825	▲4.4
Hawke's Bay	66,990	71,364	▲4,374	▲6.5
Taranaki	50,004	52,992	▲2,988	▲6.0
Manawatū-Whanganui	103,317	108,903	▲5,586	▲5.4
Wellington	203,019	215,991	▲12,972	▲6.4
North Island	1,396,140	1,522,323	▲126,183	▲9.0
Tasman	23,733	26,352	▲2,619	▲11.0
Nelson	21,534	22,845	▲1,311	▲6.1
Marlborough	22,719	24,807	▲2,088	▲9.2
West Coast	17,547	18,564	▲1,017	▲5.8
Canterbury	256,158	282,039	▲25,881	▲10.1
Otago	103,614	112,473	▲8,859	▲8.6
Southland	44,691	46,761	▲2,070	▲4.6
South Island	489,993	533,838	▲43,845	▲8.9
Area outside region	381	417	▲36	▲9.4
New Zealand	1,886,517	2,056,578	▲170,061	▲9.0

=== Summary by region ===
Region	Ethnic group (%)				Age (%)					Maori descent	
Region	European	Maori	Pacific	Asian	0–14	15–29	30–64	65+	Median	Yes	No
Northland	73.0	37.4	4.9	4.8	19.6	15.4	43.2	21.8	43.2	39.9	56.7
Auckland	49.8	12.3	16.6	31.3	19.2	20.9	46.5	13.3	35.9	13.8	84.1
Waikato	71.7	25.2	5.2	12.2	20.2	18.7	43.9	17.3	37.9	27.6	69.2
Bay of Plenty	71.9	30.6	4.3	8.8	19.9	17.2	43.5	19.4	39.7	32.9	64.2
Gisborne	56.5	54.8	5.6	3.8	22.2	18.8	42.3	16.6	36.7	56.0	41.3
Hawke's Bay	73.3	28.6	6.2	6.5	19.8	17.3	43.6	19.4	40.4	30.6	66.2
Taranaki	83.6	21.8	2.6	5.7	20.2	16.4	44.4	19.1	40.4	24.4	71.8
Manawatū-Whanganui	78.1	25.1	5.0	7.7	19.3	18.3	42.8	19.5	39.7	27.3	69.0
Wellington	72.6	15.5	9.1	15.2	17.2	20.9	46.3	15.5	37.9	17.0	80.5
North Island	63.1	19.8	10.6	19.3	19.3	19.5	45.2	16.0		21.6	75.7
Tasman	90.7	9.9	2.6	4.0	16.4	14.7	45.5	23.3	46.8	11.8	84.5
Nelson	84.7	11.9	2.8	8.6	16.6	15.6	46.2	21.6	44.0	13.3	83.5
Marlborough	85.9	14.9	3.7	5.4	16.6	14.4	45.0	23.9	46.1	16.9	79.4
West Coast	89.7	13.5	1.6	4.0	16.3	13.5	47.5	22.6	48.1	15.2	80.5
Canterbury	80.3	10.6	3.7	13.3	17.5	19.3	45.7	17.4	39.1	12.2	84.6
Otago	85.2	9.9	3.4	8.5	15.7	22.2	44.4	17.7	38.4	11.6	84.9
Southland	84.1	16.8	3.3	7.1	18.9	17.2	45.4	18.5	40.4	19.4	75.8
South Island	82.8	11.3	3.4	10.5	17.1	19.0	45.5	18.6		13.0	83.6
Area outside region	72.5	66.4	3.8	2.8	15.6	15.2	53.6	16.6	44.1	67.8	28.9
New Zealand	67.8	17.8	8.9	17.3	18.7	19.4	45.3	16.6	38.1	19.6	77.6

In June 2025, Statistics New Zealand released new figures from the 2023 Census showing that 86,000 people moved from the North Island to the South Island between 2018 and 2023. During that same period, 30,000 people migrated from the South Island to the North Island.

=== Gender and sexual identity ===
New census questions allowed data to be gathered for the first time on, among others, the LGBTIQ+ population. Data found that 1 in 20 adults identified as LGBTIQ+.

=== Religious affiliation ===
According to the 2023 census, 51.6% of the New Zealand population (2,576,049) identified as having "no religion," 32.3% as Christian (1,614,636), 2.9% as Hindu (144,753), 1.5% as Muslim (75,318), 1.4% as Mormon, 1.1% as Sikh, 0.92% as Buddhist.
