= Results of the 2025 New Zealand territorial authority elections in Canterbury =

Election in New Zealand

2025 New Zealand territorial authority elections (Canterbury)
- 11 October 2025
- Turnout: 178,433 (42.08% ▼3.42 pp)
- 9 of 9 local councils
| Party | Councils | +/– |
|---|---|---|
| No majority | 9 | 0 |
This lists parties that won seats. See the complete results below.
- 3 mayors and 26 local councillors
| Party | Seats | +/– |
Mayors
| Independent | 9 | 0 |
Local councillors
| Independent | 76 | −2 |
| People's Choice | 6 | +1 |
| Independent Citizens | 2 | 0 |
| Standing Together | 1 | +1 |
| Labour | 1 | 0 |
This lists parties that won seats. See the complete results below.

Elections for the territorial authorities of New Zealand were held from 9 September until 11 October 2025 as part of that year's nation-wide local elections. 709 local councillors and 66 mayors were elected across 66 of 67 councils.

9 territorial authorities are located in the Canterbury region. 9 mayors and 86 district and city councillors were elected.

== Maps ==

Legend
| Independent hold | Independent gain |
| PC / Labour hold | PC / Labour gain |
| Independent Citizens hold | |
| | Standing Together gain |

== Summary ==
=== Overall ===
| Council | Electoral system | Seats | Mayor | Councillors | Control | Turnout | Details | Refs |
|---|---|---|---|---|---|---|---|---|
| Kaikōura | FPP | 7 | ▌ Independent hold | ▌ Independent 7 ( 0) | ▌ No majority | 1,881; 61.43% ▼2.87 pp | Details | |
| Hurunui | FPP | 10 | ▌ Independent hold | ▌ Independent 10 ( 0) | ▌ No majority | 3,337; 34.45% ▼14.96 pp | Details | |
| Waimakariri | FPP | 10 | ▌ Independent hold | ▌ Independent 9 (▼1) ▌ Standing Together 1 (▲1) | ▌ No majority | 9,540; 48.39% ▼0.06 pp | Details | |
| Christchurch | FPP | 16 | ▌ Independent hold | ▌ Independent 7 (▼1) ▌ People's Choice / Labour 7 (▲1) (Note: ▌ People's Choice 4 (▲1) ▌ People's Choice / Labour 2 ( 0) ▌ Labour 1 ( 0)) ▌ Independent Citizens 2 ( 0) | ▌ No majority | 107,475; 38.30% ▼6.06 pp | Details | |
| Selwyn | FPP | 10 | ▌ Independent gain | ▌ Independent 10 ( 0) | ▌ No majority | 26,440; 48.32% ▲5.18 pp | Details | |
| Ashburton | FPP | 9 | ▌ Independent gain | ▌ Independent 9 ( 0) | ▌ No majority | 10,658; 46.39% ▼4.72 pp | Details | |
| Timaru | FPP | 9 | ▌ Independent hold | ▌ Independent 9 ( 0) | ▌ No majority | 16,259; 48.39% ▼1.21 pp | Details | |
| Mackenzie | FPP | 7 | ▌ Independent gain | ▌ Independent 7 ( 0) | ▌ No majority | 2,130; 61.35% ▲5.46 pp | Details | |
| Waimate | FPP | 8 | ▌ Independent hold | ▌ Independent 8 ( 0) | ▌ No majority | 2,954; 53.52% ▼0.87 pp | Details | |
| 9 of 9 councils | | 86 | | | | | | |

=== Mayors ===
| Council | Incumbent | Elected | Runner-up | Details | Refs |
|---|---|---|---|---|---|
| Kaikōura | Craig Mackle (Ind) | | John Diver (Ind) | Details | |
| Hurunui | Marie Black (Ind) | | unopposed | Details | |
| Waimakariri | Dan Gordon (Ind) | | Paul Williams (STFW) | Details | |
| Christchurch | Phil Mauger (Ind) | | Sara Templeton (Ind) | Details | |
| Selwyn | Sam Broughton (Ind) | Lydia Gliddon (Ind) | Sam Broughton (Ind) | Details | |
| Ashburton | Neil Brown^{R} (Ind) | Liz McMillan (Ind) | Russell Ellis (Ind) | Details | |
| Timaru | Nigel Bowen (Ind) | | Stu Piddington (Ind) | Details | |
| Mackenzie | Anne Munro^{R} (Ind) | Scott Aronsen (Ind) | Karen Morgan (Ind) | Details | |
| Waimate | Craig Rowley (Ind) | | Sharyn Cain (Ind) | Details | |
^{R} did not run for re-election

=== Candidates ===
| Party / ticket | Mayors | | | | Councillors | | | |
| Party / ticket | 2022 | Candidates | Elected | +/− | 2022 | Candidates | Elected | +/− |
|---|---|---|---|---|---|---|---|---|
| Independent | 9 | 31 | 9 | 0 | 78 | 161 | 76 | ▼2 |
| People's Choice (Note: Includes joint The People's Choice and Labour candidates) | no candidates | | | | 5 | 8 | 6 | ▲1 |
| Independent Citizens | no candidates | | | | 2 | 3 | 2 | 0 |
| Standing Together | (new) | 1 | 0 | 0 | (new) | 6 | 1 | ▲1 |
| Labour (Note: Excludes joints The People's Choice and Labour candidates) | no candidates | | | | 1 | 1 | 1 | 0 |
| ACT Local | no candidates | | | | (new) | 4 | 0 | 0 |
| Alliance | no candidates | | | | 0 | 1 | 0 | 0 |
| Seats: | 9 | | 9 | 0 | 86 | | 86 | 0 |

== Kaikōura District Council ==
2025 Kaikōura District Council election
- 11 October 2025
- Turnout: 1,881 (61.43% ▼2.87 pp)
- Mayor
| | | Ind |
| Candidate | Craig Mackle | John Diver |
| Party | Independent | Independent |
| Popular vote | 1,342 | 400 |
| Percentage | 71.35% | 21.27% |
Mayor before election
Craig Mackle
Independent
Elected mayor
Craig Mackle
Independent
- Councillors
- 7 seats on the governing body of Kaikōura District Council; 4 seats needed for a majority
| Party | Seats | +/– |
|---|---|---|
| Independent | 7 | 0 |
This lists parties that won seats. See the complete results below.
| Control before | Control after |
|---|---|
| No majority | No majority |

=== 2025 Kaikōura mayoral election ===
2025 Kaikōura mayoral election
| Party | Candidate | Votes | % | ±% |
|---|---|---|---|---|
| Independent | Craig Mackle^{†} | 1,342 | 71.35 | +5.03 |
| Independent | John Gregory Diver | 400 | 21.27 | (new) |
| Independent | Dave Anderson | 89 | 4.73 | (new) |
| Informal votes | | 0 | 0.00 | +0.00 |
| Blank votes | | 50 | 2.66 | +1.15 |
| Turnout | | 1,881 | 61.43 | −2.87 |
| Registered electors | | 3,062 | | |
| Independent hold | | | | |
^{†} incumbent

=== Kaikōura at-large ===
2025 Kaikōura District Council election
| Party | Candidate | Votes | % | ±% |
|---|---|---|---|---|
| Independent | Vicki Gulleford^{†} | 1,115 | 59.28 | −0.89 |
| Independent | Tony Blunt^{†} | 1,041 | 55.34 | −2.38 |
| Independent | Kevin Heays^{†} | 1,003 | 53.32 | −3.72 |
| Independent | John Gregory Diver^{†} | 927 | 49.28 | −1.08 |
| Independent | Corrina Allen Smith | 867 | 46.09 | (new) |
| Independent | Joshua McInnes | 860 | 45.72 | (new) |
| Independent | Mark Redwood | 840 | 44.66 | (new) |
| Independent | Rosie Clemett | 804 | 42.74 | (new) |
| Independent | Melanie Campbell | 765 | 40.67 | (new) |
| Independent | John Booker | 590 | 31.37 | −5.18 |
| Independent | Ted Howard | 570 | 30.30 | −0.88 |
| Independent | Te Awhina Rangimarie Arahanga | 480 | 25.52 | (new) |
| Independent | Kd Scattergood | 379 | 20.15 | (new) |
| Independent | Dave Anderson | 295 | 15.68 | +1.65 |
| Independent | Barry Aylward | 253 | 13.45 | (new) |
| Independent | Rex Stentiford | 233 | 12.39 | (new) |
| Informal votes | | 3 | 0.16 | +0.16 |
| Blank votes | | 1 | 0.05 | −0.84 |
| Turnout | | 1,881 | 61.43 | −2.87 |
| Registered electors | | 3,062 | | |
| Independent hold | | | | |
| Independent hold | | | | |
| Independent hold | | | | |
| Independent hold | | | | |
| Independent gain from Independent | | | | |
| Independent gain from Independent | | | | |
| Independent gain from Independent | | | | |
^{†} incumbent

== Hurunui District Council ==
2025 Hurunui District Council election
- 11 October 2025
- Turnout: 3,337 (34.45% ▼14.96 pp)
- Mayor
| | Ind |
| Candidate | Marie Black |
| Party | Independent |
| Popular vote | Unopposed |
Mayor before election
Marie Black
Independent
Elected mayor
Marie Black
Independent
- Councillors
- 10 seats on the governing body of Hurunui District Council; 6 seats needed for a majority
| Party | Seats | +/– |
|---|---|---|
| Independent | 10 | 0 |
This lists parties that won seats. See the complete results below.
| Control before | Control after |
|---|---|
| No majority | No majority |

=== 2025 Hurunui mayoral election ===
2025 Hurunui mayoral election
| Party | Candidate | Votes | % | ±% |
|---|---|---|---|---|
| Independent | Marie Black^{†} | elected unopposed | | |
| Registered electors | | 9,687 | | |
| Independent hold | | | | |
^{†} incumbent

=== West ward ===
2025 West ward election
| Party | Candidate | Votes | % | ±% |
|---|---|---|---|---|
| Independent | Dave Hislop^{†} | 959 | 69.29 | n/a |
| Independent | Chris Scarlet | 912 | 65.90 | (new) |
| Independent | Tom Davies^{†} | 905 | 65.39 | n/a |
| Independent | Christopher Carthy | 693 | 50.07 | (new) |
| Independent | Richard E Roe | 342 | 24.71 | (new) |
| Informal votes | | 1 | 0.07 | n/a |
| Blank votes | | 12 | 0.87 | n/a |
| Turnout | | 1,384 | 41.91 | n/a |
| Registered electors | | 3,302 | | |
| Independent hold | | | | |
| Independent gain from Independent | | | | |
| Independent hold | | | | |
| Independent gain from Independent | | | | |
^{†} incumbent

=== East ward ===
2025 East ward election
| Party | Candidate | Votes | % | ±% |
|---|---|---|---|---|
| Independent | Vincent Daly^{†} | elected unopposed | | |
| Independent | Fiona Harris^{†} | elected unopposed | | |
| Registered electors | | 1,873 | | |
| Independent hold | | | | |
| Independent hold | | | | |
^{†} incumbent

=== South ward ===
2025 South ward election
| Party | Candidate | Votes | % | ±% |
|---|---|---|---|---|
| Independent | Robbie Bruerton^{†} | 1,100 | 56.32 | −6.53 |
| Independent | Pauline White^{†} | 1,064 | 54.48 | +6.92 |
| Independent | Brett Jones | 906 | 46.39 | (new) |
| Independent | Steve Hutt | 695 | 35.59 | (new) |
| ACT Local | Tom Spooner | 581 | 29.75 | (new) |
| Independent | Michael Ennis | 567 | 29.03 | (new) |
| Independent | Barrie Nunn | 519 | 26.57 | (new) |
| Independent | Dave Carr | 443 | 22.68 | (new) |
| Independent | Lulu Webb | 431 | 22.07 | (new) |
| Informal votes | | 9 | 0.46 | +0.36 |
| Blank votes | | 13 | 0.67 | +0.22 |
| Turnout | | 1,953 | 43.28 | −5.89 |
| Registered electors | | 4,512 | | |
| Independent hold | | | | |
| Independent hold | | | | |
| Independent gain from Independent | | | | |
| Independent gain from Independent | | | | |
^{†} incumbent

== Waimakariri District Council ==
2025 Waimakariri District Council election
- 11 October 2025
- Turnout: 9,540 (48.39% ▼0.06 pp)
- Mayor
| | Ind | ST |
| Candidate | Dan Gordon | Paul Williams |
| Party | Independent | Standing Together |
| Popular vote | 15,766 | 5,132 |
| Percentage | 74.47% | 24.24% |
Mayor before election
Dan Gordon
Independent
Elected mayor
Dan Gordon
Independent
- Councillors
- 10 seats on the governing body of Waimakariri District Council; 6 seats needed for a majority
| Party | Seats | +/– |
|---|---|---|
| Independent | 9 | −1 |
| Standing Together | 1 | +1 |
This lists parties that won seats. See the complete results below.
| Control before | Control after |
|---|---|
| No majority | No majority |

=== 2025 Waimakariri mayoral election ===
2025 Waimakariri mayoral election
| Party | Candidate | Votes | % | ±% |
|---|---|---|---|---|
| Independent | Dan Gordon^{†} | 15,766 | 74.47 | −10.47 |
| Standing Together | Paul Williams | 5,132 | 24.24 | (new) |
| Informal votes | | 2 | 0.01 | +0.00 |
| Blank votes | | 270 | 1.28 | +0.01 |
| Turnout | | 21,170 | 43.07 | −2.18 |
| Registered electors | | 49,151 | | |
| Independent hold | | | | |
^{†} incumbent

=== Oxford-Ohoka ward ===
2025 Oxford-Ohoka ward election
| Party | Candidate | Votes | % | ±% |
|---|---|---|---|---|
| Independent | Niki Mealings^{†} | 2,527 | 62.23 | +8.53 |
| Independent | Tim Fulton^{†} | 2,423 | 59.67 | +20.15 |
| Standing Together | Rob Ballantyne | 1,293 | 31.84 | (new) |
| Standing Together | Gordon Malcolm | 1,065 | 26.23 | (new) |
| Informal votes | | 3 | 0.07 | −0.33 |
| Blank votes | | 95 | 2.34 | +0.30 |
| Turnout | | 4,061 | 43.26 | −2.79 |
| Registered electors | | 9,388 | | |
| Independent hold | | | | |
| Independent hold | | | | |
^{†} incumbent

=== Rangiora-Ashley ward ===
2025 Rangiora-Ashley ward election
| Party | Candidate | Votes | % | ±% |
|---|---|---|---|---|
| Independent | Jason Goldsworthy^{†} | 5,040 | 52.83 | +21.48 |
| Independent | Joan Ward^{†} | 4,431 | 46.45 | −10.41 |
| Independent | Wendy Doody | 4,085 | 42.82 | (new) |
| Independent | Bruce McLaren | 3,872 | 40.59 | (new) |
| Standing Together | Paul Williams^{†} | 3,222 | 33.77 | −18.23 |
| Independent | Robbie Brine^{†} | 3,083 | 32.32 | −8.85 |
| Independent | Wayne Linton | 2,772 | 29.06 | +0.59 |
| Standing Together | Steve Wilkinson | 2,610 | 27.36 | +6.66 |
| Standing Together | James Bourke | 2,287 | 23.97 | (new) |
| Independent | Sam Fisher | 1,110 | 11.64 | −2.08 |
| Informal votes | | 46 | 0.48 | +0.12 |
| Blank votes | | 264 | 2.77 | −0.16 |
| Turnout | | 9,540 | 48.39 | −0.06 |
| Registered electors | | 19,716 | | |
| Independent hold | | | | |
| Independent hold | | | | |
| Independent gain from Independent | | | | |
| Independent gain from Independent | | | | |
^{†} incumbent

=== Kaiapoi-Woodend ward ===
2025 Kaiapoi-Woodend ward election
| Party | Candidate | Votes | % | ±% |
|---|---|---|---|---|
| Independent | Brent Cairns^{†} | 3,947 | 52.15 | +18.79 |
| Independent | Philip Redmond^{†} | 3,895 | 51.46 | +0.96 |
| Independent | Shona Powell | 3,214 | 42.46 | +12.66 |
| Standing Together | Tim Bartle | 2,791 | 36.87 | +18.22 |
| Independent | Matt James | 2,348 | 31.02 | (new) |
| ACT Local | Nathan Atkins | 2,180 | 28.80 | (new) |
| Independent | Sandra Stewart | 1,964 | 25.95 | −3.03 |
| Independent | Henrietta Carroll | 1,801 | 23.79 | (new) |
| Independent | Prudence Stone | 1,566 | 20.69 | (new) |
| Independent | Natalie Leary | 1,007 | 13.30 | +1.95 |
| Informal votes | | 30 | 0.40 | −0.04 |
| Blank votes | | 214 | 2.83 | +0.02 |
| Turnout | | 7,569 | 37.76 | −3.72 |
| Registered electors | | 20,047 | | |
| Independent hold | | | | |
| Independent hold | | | | |
| Independent gain from Independent | | | | |
| Standing Together gain from Independent | | | | |
^{†} incumbent

== Christchurch City Council ==
2025 Christchurch City Council election
- 11 October 2025
- Turnout: 107,475 (38.30% ▼6.06 pp)
- Mayor
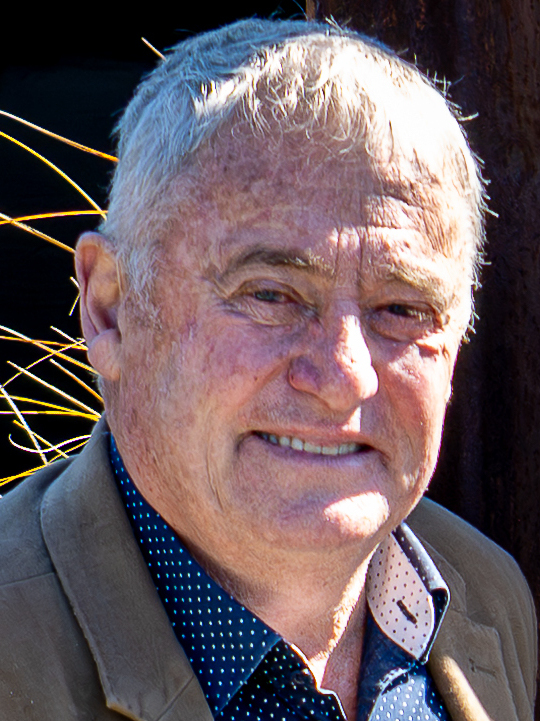

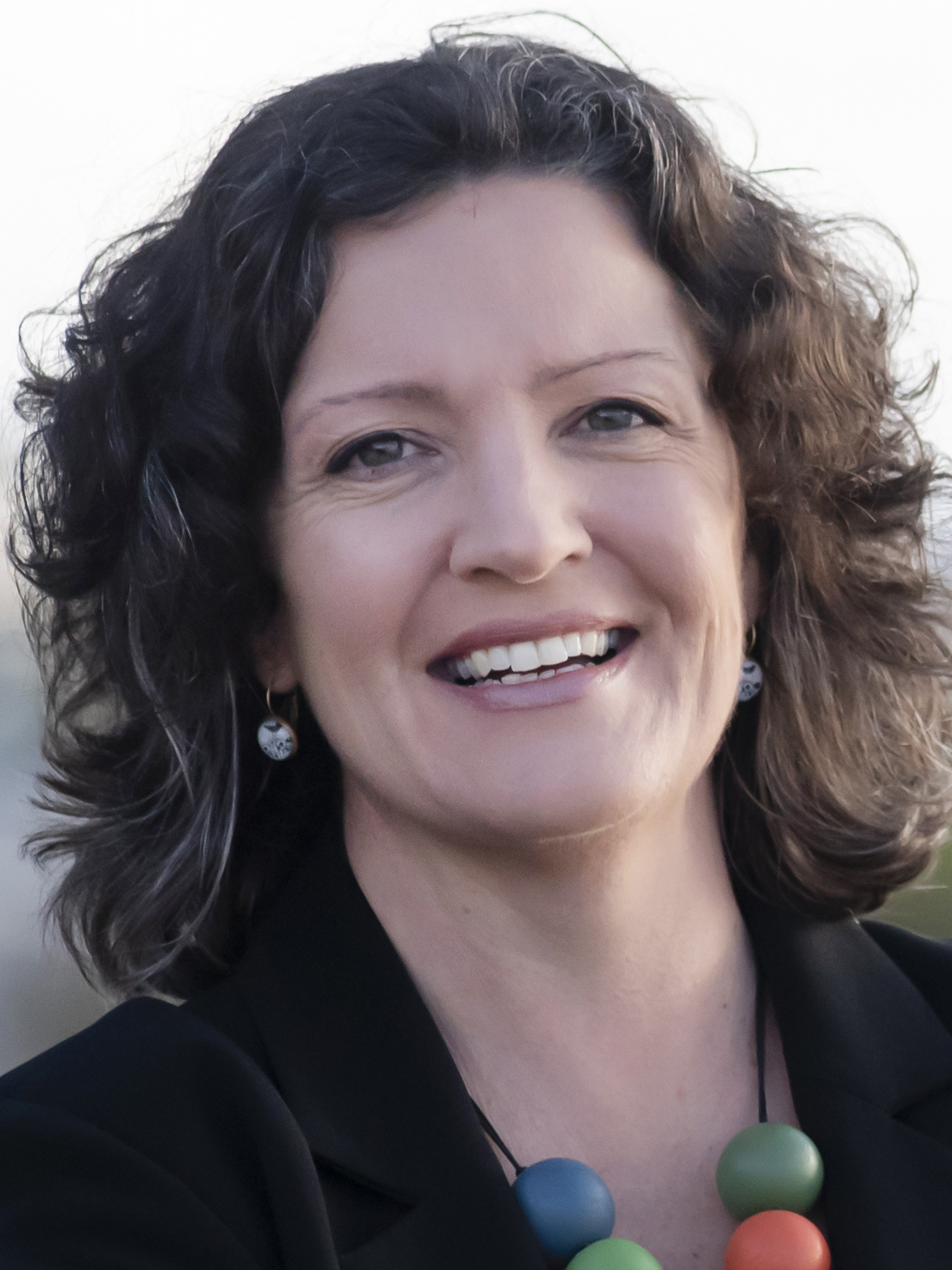
| Candidate | Phil Mauger | Sara Templeton |
| Party | Independent | Independent |
| Popular vote | 60,137 | 40,533 |
| Percentage | 55.95% | 37.71% |
Mayor before election
Phil Mauger
Independent
Elected mayor
Phil Mauger
Independent
- Councillors
- 16 seats on the governing body of Christchurch City Council; 9 seats needed for a majority
| Party | Seats | +/– |
|---|---|---|
| Independent | 7 | −1 |
| People's Choice and Labour | 7 | +1 |
| Independent Citizens | 2 | 0 |
This lists parties that won seats. See the complete results below.
Independent hold
PC / Labour hold PC / Labour gain
Independent Citizens hold
| Control before | Control after |
|---|---|
| No majority | No majority |

=== 2025 Christchurch mayoral election ===
2025 Christchurch mayoral election
| Party | Candidate | Votes | % | ±% |
|---|---|---|---|---|
| Independent | Phil Mauger^{†} | 60,137 | 55.95 | +11.39 |
| Independent | Sara Templeton | 40,533 | 37.71 | (new) |
| Independent | Thomas Healey | 1,714 | 1.59 | (new) |
| Independent | Nikora Nitro | 1,525 | 1.42 | +0.56 |
| Independent | Blair Anderson | 1,327 | 1.23 | (new) |
| Independent | Phil Arps | 448 | 0.42 | (new) |
| Independent | Tubby Hansen | 354 | 0.33 | +0.09 |
| Independent | P Wakeman | 320 | 0.30 | −0.50 |
| Informal votes | | 105 | 0.10 | +0.02 |
| Blank votes | | 1,008 | 0.94 | +0.16 |
| Turnout | | 107,475 | 38.30 | −6.06 |
| Registered electors | | 280,587 | | |
| Independent hold | | | | |
^{†} incumbent

=== Harewood ward ===
2025 Harewood ward election
| Party | Candidate | Votes | % | ±% |
|---|---|---|---|---|
| Independent | Aaron Keown^{†} | elected unopposed | | |
| Registered electors | | 19,882 | | |
| Independent hold | | | | |
^{†} incumbent

=== Waimairi ward ===
2025 Waimairi ward election
| Party | Candidate | Votes | % | ±% |
|---|---|---|---|---|
| Independent Citizens | Sam MacDonald^{†} | elected unopposed | | |
| Registered electors | | 17,376 | | |
| Independent Citizens hold | | | | |
^{†} incumbent

=== Papanui ward ===
2025 Papanui ward election
| Party | Candidate | Votes | % | ±% |
|---|---|---|---|---|
| Independent | Victoria Henstock^{†} | 4,367 | 65.93 | +3.97 |
| People's Choice | Simon Britten | 2,105 | 31.78 | (new) |
| Informal votes | | 3 | 0.05 | +0.03 |
| Blank votes | | 149 | 2.25 | −1.43 |
| Turnout | | 6,624 | 36.91 | −8.26 |
| Registered electors | | 17,944 | | |
| Independent hold | | | | |
^{†} incumbent

=== Fendalton ward ===
2025 Fendalton ward election
| Party | Candidate | Votes | % | ±% |
|---|---|---|---|---|
| Independent Citizens | David Cartwright | 5,228 | 66.43 | (new) |
| Independent | Xavier Dickason | 1,683 | 21.39 | (new) |
| Independent | Diane Ellis | 640 | 8.13 | (new) |
| Informal votes | | 11 | 0.14 | +0.13 |
| Blank votes | | 308 | 3.91 | +0.24 |
| Turnout | | 7,870 | 41.85 | −8.95 |
| Registered electors | | 18,806 | | |
| Independent Citizens hold | | | | |

=== Innes ward ===
2025 Innes ward election
| Party | Candidate | Votes | % | ±% |
|---|---|---|---|---|
| People's Choice | Pauline Cotter^{†} | 3,273 | 50.81 | +11.40 |
| Independent | Ali Jones | 3,027 | 46.99 | +7.81 |
| Informal votes | | 3 | 0.05 | −0.51 |
| Blank votes | | 139 | 2.16 | −1.48 |
| Turnout | | 6,442 | 35.90 | −3.48 |
| Registered electors | | 17,944 | | |
| People's Choice hold | | | | |
^{†} incumbent

=== Burwood ward ===
2025 Burwood ward election
| Party | Candidate | Votes | % | ±% |
|---|---|---|---|---|
| Independent | Kelly Barber^{†} | 5,390 | 77.06 | +26.90 |
| People's Choice/Labour | Fionna Chapman | 1,455 | 20.80 | (new) |
| Informal votes | | 1 | 0.01 | −0.33 |
| Blank votes | | 149 | 2.13 | −1.55 |
| Turnout | | 6,995 | 38.74 | −6.67 |
| Registered electors | | 18,057 | | |
| Independent hold | | | | |
^{†} incumbent

=== Coastal ward ===
2025 Coastal ward election
| Party | Candidate | Votes | % | ±% |
|---|---|---|---|---|
| Independent | Celeste Donovan^{†} | 4,605 | 58.24 | +10.87 |
| Independent | Jo Zervos | 2,844 | 35.97 | (new) |
| Independent | Taraia Brown | 333 | 4.21 | (new) |
| Informal votes | | 12 | 0.15 | −0.09 |
| Blank votes | | 113 | 1.43 | −0.91 |
| Turnout | | 7,907 | 41.62 | −5.74 |
| Registered electors | | 18,999 | | |
| Independent hold | | | | |
^{†} incumbent

=== Hornby ward ===
2025 Hornby ward election
| Party | Candidate | Votes | % | ±% |
|---|---|---|---|---|
| Independent | Mark Peters^{†} | elected unopposed | | |
| Registered electors | | 17,449 | | |
| Independent hold | | | | |
^{†} incumbent

=== Halswell ward ===
2025 Halswell ward election
| Party | Candidate | Votes | % | ±% |
|---|---|---|---|---|
| Independent | Andrei Moore^{†} | 7,513 | 85.12 | +23.29 |
| Independent Citizens | Dylan Smart | 1,161 | 13.15 | (new) |
| Informal votes | | 4 | 0.05 | −0.39 |
| Blank votes | | 148 | 1.68 | +0.06 |
| Turnout | | 8,826 | 41.70 | −7.77 |
| Registered electors | | 21,165 | | |
| Independent hold | | | | |
^{†} incumbent

=== Riccarton ward ===
2025 Riccarton ward election
| Party | Candidate | Votes | % | ±% |
|---|---|---|---|---|
| People's Choice | Tyla Harrison-Hunt^{†} | 1,657 | 40.16 | +11.15 |
| Independent | Tony Simons | 1,139 | 27.61 | (new) |
| Independent | Sam Yau | 630 | 15.27 | −0.88 |
| Independent | Debbie Mora | 366 | 8.87 | (new) |
| Independent | Mark Chirnside | 242 | 5.87 | −3.09 |
| Informal votes | | 16 | 0.39 | −1.16 |
| Blank votes | | 75 | 1.82 | −2.17 |
| Turnout | | 4,126 | 27.08 | −3.90 |
| Registered electors | | 15,234 | | |
| People's Choice hold | | | | |
^{†} incumbent

=== Spreydon ward ===
2025 Spreydon ward election
| Party | Candidate | Votes | % | ±% |
|---|---|---|---|---|
| People's Choice/Labour | Melanie Coker^{†} | 4,315 | 73.22 | +9.18 |
| Independent | Ben Yorston | 883 | 14.98 | (new) |
| Independent | Terry Craze | 410 | 6.96 | −0.31 |
| Independent | Tubby Hansen | 99 | 1.68 | −0.28 |
| Informal votes | | 20 | 0.34 | −0.16 |
| Blank votes | | 166 | 2.82 | −1.81 |
| Turnout | | 5,893 | 33.06 | −6.03 |
| Registered electors | | 17,823 | | |
| People's Choice/Labour hold | | | | |
^{†} incumbent

=== Central ward ===
2025 Central ward election
| Party | Candidate | Votes | % | ±% |
|---|---|---|---|---|
| Labour | Jake McLellan^{†} | 1,870 | 38.94 | −11.23 |
| Independent | Raf Manji | 1,203 | 25.05 | (new) |
| Independent | Hayley Guglietta | 941 | 19.60 | (new) |
| Alliance | Tom Roud | 407 | 8.48 | (new) |
| Independent | Mace Reid | 235 | 4.89 | (new) |
| Informal votes | | 42 | 0.87 | +0.66 |
| Blank votes | | 103 | 2.14 | −2.20 |
| Turnout | | 4,802 | 30.20 | −2.41 |
| Registered electors | | 15,902 | | |
| Labour hold | | | | |
^{†} incumbent

=== Cashmere ward ===
2025 Cashmere ward election
| Party | Candidate | Votes | % | ±% |
|---|---|---|---|---|
| Independent | Tim Scandrett^{†} | 5,819 | 61.57 | +18.03 |
| Independent | Clare Marks | 3,158 | 33.41 | (new) |
| Informal votes | | 5 | 0.05 | −0.43 |
| Blank votes | | 469 | 4.96 | +0.65 |
| Turnout | | 9,451 | 46.83 | −7.95 |
| Registered electors | | 20,180 | | |
| Independent hold | | | | |
^{†} incumbent

=== Linwood ward ===
2025 Linwood ward election
| Party | Candidate | Votes | % | ±% |
|---|---|---|---|---|
| People's Choice/Labour | Yani Johanson^{†} | 3,701 | 72.20 | −3.46 |
| Independent | Evan Baker | 867 | 16.91 | (new) |
| Independent | Ethan Gullery | 443 | 8.64 | (new) |
| Informal votes | | 14 | 0.27 | +0.20 |
| Blank votes | | 101 | 1.97 | −2.42 |
| Turnout | | 5,126 | 31.23 | −3.90 |
| Registered electors | | 16,413 | | |
| People's Choice/Labour hold | | | | |
^{†} incumbent

=== Heathcote ward ===
2025 Heathcote ward election
| Party | Candidate | Votes | % | ±% |
|---|---|---|---|---|
| People's Choice | Nathaniel Herz Jardine | 5,206 | 57.35 | (new) |
| Independent | Ian Kearney | 3,594 | 39.59 | (new) |
| Informal votes | | 7 | 0.08 | −0.14 |
| Blank votes | | 270 | 2.97 | −2.14 |
| Turnout | | 9,077 | 45.67 | −2.70 |
| Registered electors | | 19,876 | | |
| People's Choice gain from Independent | | | | |

=== Banks Peninsula ward ===
2025 Banks Peninsula ward election
| Party | Candidate | Votes | % | ±% |
|---|---|---|---|---|
| People's Choice | Tyrone Fields^{†} | 2,952 | 71.84 | +44.62 |
| Independent | Dave Dunlay | 1,062 | 25.85 | (new) |
| Informal votes | | 0 | 0.00 | −0.84 |
| Blank votes | | 93 | 2.26 | +0.35 |
| Turnout | | 4,109 | 54.52 | −7.28 |
| Registered electors | | 7,537 | | |
| People's Choice hold | | | | |
^{†} incumbent

== Selwyn District Council ==
2025 Selwyn District Council election
- 11 October 2025
- Turnout: 26,440 (48.32% ▲5.18 pp)
- Mayor
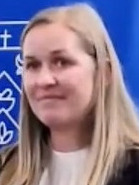

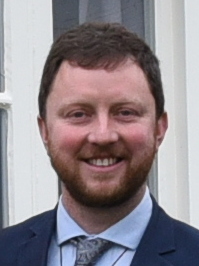
| | | | Ind |
| Candidate | Lydia Gliddon | Sam Broughton | Brad Mannering |
| Party | Independent | Independent | Independent |
| Popular vote | 19,129 | 5,277 | 1,867 |
| Percentage | 72.35% | 19.96% | 7.06% |
Mayor before election
Sam Broughton
Independent
Elected mayor
Lydia Gliddon
Independent
- Councillors
- 10 seats on the governing body of Selwyn District Council; 6 seats needed for a majority
| Party | Seats | +/– |
|---|---|---|
| Independent | 10 | 0 |
This lists parties that won seats. See the complete results below.
| Control before | Control after |
|---|---|
| No majority | No majority |

=== 2025 Selwyn mayoral election ===
2025 Selwyn mayoral election
| Party | Candidate | Votes | % | ±% |
|---|---|---|---|---|
| Independent | Lydia Gliddon | 19,129 | 72.35 | (new) |
| Independent | Sam Broughton^{†} | 5,277 | 19.96 | −53.24 |
| Independent | Brad Mannering | 1,867 | 7.06 | (new) |
| Informal votes | | 5 | 0.02 | −0.02 |
| Blank votes | | 162 | 0.61 | −1.25 |
| Turnout | | 26,440 | 48.32 | +5.18 |
| Registered electors | | 54,722 | | |
| Independent gain from Independent | | | | |
^{†} incumbent

=== Selwyn at-large ===
2025 Selwyn at-large election
| Party | Candidate | Votes | % | ±% |
|---|---|---|---|---|
| Independent | Tracey MacLeod | 11,553 | 43.70 | (new) |
| Independent | Samuel Wilshire | 9,591 | 36.27 | (new) |
| Independent | Sharon Hunt | 7,362 | 27.84 | (new) |
| Independent | Calvin Payne | 6,315 | 23.88 | (new) |
| Independent | Barry Mackenzie | 6,263 | 23.69 | (new) |
| Independent | Samantha Samuel | 5,888 | 22.27 | (new) |
| Informal votes | | 128 | 0.48 | n/a |
| Blank votes | | 1,156 | 4.37 | n/a |
| Turnout | | 26,440 | 48.32 | n/a |
| Registered electors | | 54,722 | | |
| Independent win (new seat) | | | | |
| Independent win (new seat) | | | | |

=== Tawera Malvern ward ===
2025 Tawera Malvern ward election
| Party | Candidate | Votes | % | ±% |
|---|---|---|---|---|
| Independent | John Verry | 2,380 | 58.39 | (new) |
| Independent | Sharn Nu'u | 1,400 | 34.35 | (new) |
| Informal votes | | 1 | 0.02 | −0.04 |
| Blank votes | | 295 | 7.24 | +5.25 |
| Turnout | | 4,076 | 60.51 | +11.33 |
| Registered electors | | 6,736 | | |
| Independent gain from Independent | | | | |

=== Kā Mānia Rolleston ward ===
2025 Kā Mānia Rolleston ward election
| Party | Candidate | Votes | % | ±% |
|---|---|---|---|---|
| Independent | Sophie McInnes^{†} | 3,290 | 38.75 | −3.94 |
| Independent | Big Red Shefford | 2,783 | 32.78 | (new) |
| Independent | Rhys Laraman | 2,716 | 31.99 | (new) |
| Independent | Joe Morris | 2,462 | 29.00 | (new) |
| Independent | Haydn Porritt | 2,296 | 27.04 | (new) |
| ACT Local | Chris Till | 2,281 | 26.87 | (new) |
| Independent | Paul Weggery | 2,047 | 24.11 | (new) |
| Independent | Moneel Pratap | 1,725 | 20.32 | −19.20 |
| Independent | Avi Aulakh | 1,305 | 15.37 | (new) |
| Independent | Prabh Singh | 718 | 8.46 | (new) |
| Independent | Errol Maffey | 656 | 7.73 | (new) |
| Independent | Ashwin aka Robert Mani | 414 | 4.88 | (new) |
| Informal votes | | 9 | 0.11 | +0.11 |
| Blank votes | | 99 | 1.17 | −0.43 |
| Turnout | | 8,490 | 42.62 | +4.56 |
| Registered electors | | 19,922 | | |
| Independent hold | | | | |
| Independent gain from Independent | | | | |
| Independent win (new seat) | | | | |
^{†} incumbent

=== Te Waihora Ellesmere ward ===
2025 Te Waihora Ellesmere ward election
| Party | Candidate | Votes | % | ±% |
|---|---|---|---|---|
| Independent | Elizabeth Mundt^{†} | 1,941 | 53.72 | +4.40 |
| Independent | Murray Lemon | 1,593 | 44.09 | (new) |
| Informal votes | | 6 | 0.17 | +0.14 |
| Blank votes | | 73 | 2.02 | −1.29 |
| Turnout | | 3,613 | 52.12 | +10.41 |
| Registered electors | | 6,932 | | |
| Independent hold | | | | |
^{†} incumbent

=== Kā Puna Springs ward ===
2025 Kā Puna Springs ward election
| Party | Candidate | Votes | % | ±% |
|---|---|---|---|---|
| Independent | Aaron McGlinchy | 6,490 | 63.25 | (new) |
| Independent | Denise Carrick | 4,848 | 47.25 | (new) |
| Independent | Sarah Barnsley | 3,481 | 33.92 | (new) |
| Independent | Zoran Rakovic | 3,403 | 33.16 | (new) |
| Independent | Karim Sabet | 3,291 | 32.07 | (new) |
| Independent | Tim Powell | 2,876 | 28.03 | (new) |
| Independent | Till Peters | 1,534 | 14.95 | (new) |
| Informal votes | | 1 | 0.01 | +0.01 |
| Blank votes | | 388 | 3.78 | +0.03 |
| Turnout | | 10,261 | 48.56 | +3.81 |
| Registered electors | | 21,132 | | |
| Independent gain from Independent | | | | |
| Independent gain from Independent | | | | |
| Independent gain from Independent | | | | |

== Ashburton District Council ==
2025 Ashburton District Council election
- 11 October 2025
- Turnout: 10,658 (46.39% ▼4.72 pp)
- Mayor
| | Ind | Ind |
| Candidate | Liz McMillan | Russell Ellis |
| Party | Independent | Independent |
| Popular vote | 5,979 | 1,989 |
| Percentage | 56.10% | 18.66% |
| | Ind | Ind |
| Candidate | Rob Mackle | Jeff Ryan |
| Party | Independent | Independent |
| Popular vote | 1,627 | 924 |
| Percentage | 15.27% | 8.67% |
Mayor before election
Neil Brown
Independent
Elected mayor
Liz McMillan
Independent
- Councillors
- 9 seats on the governing body of Ashburton District Council; 5 seats needed for a majority
| Party | Seats | +/– |
|---|---|---|
| Independent | 9 | 0 |
This lists parties that won seats. See the complete results below.
| Control before | Control after |
|---|---|
| No majority | No majority |

=== 2025 Ashburton mayoral election ===
2025 Ashburton mayoral election
| Party | Candidate | Votes | % | ±% |
|---|---|---|---|---|
| Independent | Liz McMillan | 5,979 | 56.10 | (new) |
| Independent | Russell Ellis | 1,989 | 18.66 | (new) |
| Independent | Rob Mackle | 1,627 | 15.27 | (new) |
| Independent | Jeff Ryan | 924 | 8.67 | (new) |
| Informal votes | | 19 | 0.18 | +0.14 |
| Blank votes | | 120 | 1.13 | −1.82 |
| Turnout | | 10,658 | 46.39 | −4.72 |
| Registered electors | | 22,974 | | |
| Independent gain from Independent | | | | |

=== Western ward (Ashburton) ===
2025 Western ward election
| Party | Candidate | Votes | % | ±% |
|---|---|---|---|---|
| Independent | Liz McMillan^{†} (withdrawn, elected mayor) | 1,708 | 76.59 | −4.22 |
| Independent | Jeanette Maxwell | 1,193 | 53.50 | (new) |
| Independent | Deb Gilkison | 954 | 42.78 | (new) |
| Informal votes | | 0 | 0.00 | +0.00 |
| Blank votes | | 16 | 0.72 | −0.18 |
| Turnout | | 2,230 | 52.92 | −0.89 |
| Registered electors | | 4,214 | | |
| Independent gain from Independent | | | | |
| Independent gain from Independent | | | | |
^{†} incumbent

=== Eastern ward (Ashburton) ===
2025 Eastern ward election
| Party | Candidate | Votes | % | ±% |
|---|---|---|---|---|
| Independent | Phillip Everest | elected unopposed | | |
| Independent | Richard Wilson^{†} | elected unopposed | | |
| Registered electors | | 4,211 | | |
| Independent gain from Independent | | | | |
| Independent hold | | | | |
^{†} incumbent

=== Ashburton ward ===
2025 Ashburton ward election
| Party | Candidate | Votes | % | ±% |
|---|---|---|---|---|
| Independent | Carolyn Cameron^{†} | 5,075 | 76.42 | +13.38 |
| Independent | Phillip Hooper^{†} | 5,071 | 76.36 | +18.12 |
| Independent | Tony Todd^{†} | 4,530 | 68.21 | +6.89 |
| Independent | Russell Ellis^{†} | 4,154 | 62.55 | +13.16 |
| Independent | Julie Moffett | 2,645 | 39.83 | (new) |
| Independent | Steph Poole | 1,960 | 29.51 | (new) |
| Independent | Jeff Ryan | 1,639 | 24.68 | (new) |
| Independent | Dolf Van Amersfoort | 960 | 14.46 | (new) |
| Independent | Leonard Cojocaru | 698 | 10.51 | (new) |
| Informal votes | | 40 | 0.60 | −0.71 |
| Blank votes | | 34 | 0.51 | −0.30 |
| Turnout | | 6,641 | 45.65 | −4.90 |
| Registered electors | | 14,549 | | |
| Independent hold | | | | |
| Independent hold | | | | |
| Independent hold | | | | |
| Independent hold | | | | |
| Independent gain from Independent | | | | |
^{†} incumbent

== Timaru District Council ==
2025 Timaru District Council election
- 11 October 2025
- Turnout: 16,259 (48.39% ▼1.21 pp)
- Mayor
| | Ind | Ind | Ind |
| Candidate | Nigel Bowen | Stuart Piddington | Peter Bennett |
| Party | Independent | Independent | Independent |
| Popular vote | 8,424 | 4,606 | 2,822 |
| Percentage | 51.81% | 28.33% | 17.36% |
Mayor before election
Nigel Bowen
Independent
Elected mayor
Nigel Bowen
Independent
- Councillors
- 9 seats on the governing body of Timaru District Council; 5 seats needed for a majority
| Party | Seats | +/– |
|---|---|---|
| Independent | 9 | 0 |
This lists parties that won seats. See the complete results below.
| Control before | Control after |
|---|---|
| No majority | No majority |

=== 2025 Timaru mayoral election ===
2025 Timaru mayoral election
| Party | Candidate | Votes | % | ±% |
|---|---|---|---|---|
| Independent | Nigel Bowen^{†} | 8,424 | 51.81 | −18.16 |
| Independent | Stu Piddington | 4,606 | 28.33 | +1.82 |
| Independent | Peter George Bennett | 2,822 | 17.36 | (new) |
| Informal votes | | 17 | 0.10 | +0.06 |
| Blank votes | | 390 | 2.40 | −1.09 |
| Turnout | | 16,259 | 48.39 | −1.21 |
| Registered electors | | 33,602 | | |
| Independent hold | | | | |
^{†} incumbent

=== Geraldine ward ===
2025 Geraldine ward election
| Party | Candidate | Votes | % | ±% |
|---|---|---|---|---|
| Independent | Philip Harper | 1,260 | 52.76 | (new) |
| Independent | Gavin Oliver^{†} | 1,088 | 45.56 | −3.77 |
| Informal votes | | 0 | 0.00 | −0.12 |
| Blank votes | | 40 | 1.68 | +1.12 |
| Turnout | | 2,388 | 52.94 | −2.69 |
| Registered electors | | 4,511 | | |
| Independent gain from Independent | | | | |
^{†} incumbent

=== Pleasant Point-Temuka ward ===
2025 Pleasant Point-Temuka ward election
| Party | Candidate | Votes | % | ±% |
|---|---|---|---|---|
| Independent | Michelle Pye^{†} | 2,223 | 73.56 | n/a |
| Independent | Scott Shannon^{†} | 1,916 | 63.40 | n/a |
| Independent | Charles Scarsbrook | 1,028 | 34.02 | (new) |
| Informal votes | | 2 | 0.07 | n/a |
| Blank votes | | 99 | 3.28 | n/a |
| Turnout | | 3,022 | 44.76 | n/a |
| Registered electors | | 6,751 | | |
| Independent hold | | | | |
| Independent hold | | | | |
^{†} incumbent

=== Timaru ward ===
2025 Timaru ward election
| Party | Candidate | Votes | % | ±% |
|---|---|---|---|---|
| Independent | Stacey Scott^{†} | 6,541 | 60.29 | +6.29 |
| Independent | Stu Piddington^{†} | 5,780 | 53.28 | −1.23 |
| Independent | Owen (OJ) Jackson^{†} | 5,665 | 52.22 | +0.86 |
| Independent | Graeme Wilson | 4,881 | 44.99 | (new) |
| Independent | Peter Burt^{†} | 4,872 | 44.91 | −8.00 |
| Independent | Chris Thomas | 3,953 | 36.44 | (new) |
| Independent | Peter George Bennett | 3,827 | 35.28 | +7.26 |
| Independent | Stu (aka Photo) Jackson | 3,730 | 34.38 | +0.38 |
| Independent | Sange Malama | 2,888 | 26.62 | (new) |
| Independent | Hadleigh Oudemans | 2,577 | 23.75 | (new) |
| ACT Local | John Bolt | 2,564 | 23.63 | (new) |
| Independent | Anah Aikman | 2,296 | 21.16 | (new) |
| Independent | Jason McDouall | 1,963 | 18.09 | (new) |
| Independent | Ian Hanley | 1,692 | 15.60 | (new) |
| Independent | Ethan Richardson | 1,620 | 14.93 | (new) |
| Informal votes | | 32 | 0.29 | −0.01 |
| Blank votes | | 25 | 0.23 | −0.78 |
| Turnout | | 10,849 | 48.56 | −1.00 |
| Registered electors | | 22,340 | | |
| Independent hold | | | | |
| Independent hold | | | | |
| Independent hold | | | | |
| Independent gain from Independent | | | | |
| Independent hold | | | | |
| Independent gain from Independent | | | | |
^{†} incumbent

== Mackenzie District Council ==
2025 Mackenzie District Council election
- 11 October 2025
- Turnout: 2,130 (61.35% ▲5.46 pp)
- Mayor
| | Ind | Ind |
| Candidate | Scott Aronsen | Karen Morgan |
| Party | Independent | Independent |
| Popular vote | 1,132 | 437 |
| Percentage | 53.15% | 20.52% |
| | Ind | Ind |
| Candidate | Elizabeth McKenzie | Ash Jackson |
| Party | Independent | Independent |
| Popular vote | 242 | 205 |
| Percentage | 11.36% | 9.62% |
Mayor before election
Anne Munro
Independent
Elected mayor
Scott Aronsen
Independent
- Councillors
- 7 seats on the governing body of Mackenzie District Council; 4 seats needed for a majority
| Party | Seats | +/– |
|---|---|---|
| Independent | 7 | 0 |
This lists parties that won seats. See the complete results below.
| Control before | Control after |
|---|---|
| No majority | No majority |

=== 2025 Mackenzie mayoral election ===
2025 Mackenzie mayoral election
| Party | Candidate | Votes | % | ±% |
|---|---|---|---|---|
| Independent | Scott Aronsen | 1,132 | 53.15 | (new) |
| Independent | Karen Morgan | 437 | 20.52 | (new) |
| Independent | Elizabeth McKenzie | 242 | 11.36 | (new) |
| Independent | Ash Jackson | 205 | 9.62 | (new) |
| Independent | Robin McCarthy | 96 | 4.51 | −13.03 |
| Informal votes | | 1 | 0.05 | +0.05 |
| Blank votes | | 17 | 0.80 | −1.41 |
| Turnout | | 2,130 | 61.35 | +5.46 |
| Registered electors | | 3,472 | | |
| Independent gain from Independent | | | | |

=== Pukaki ward ===
2025 Pukaki ward election
| Party | Candidate | Votes | % | ±% |
|---|---|---|---|---|
| Independent | Scott Aronsen^{†} (withdrawn, elected mayor) | 587 | 68.57 | +19.12 |
| Independent | Jan Spriggs | 500 | 58.41 | (new) |
| Independent | Frank Hocken | 361 | 42.17 | (new) |
| Independent | Brian Finn | 358 | 41.82 | (new) |
| Independent | Peter Oliver | 234 | 27.34 | (new) |
| Independent | Christopher Hathaway | 190 | 22.20 | (new) |
| Informal votes | | 0 | 0.00 | −0.14 |
| Blank votes | | 4 | 0.47 | −0.63 |
| Turnout | | 856 | 61.10 | +6.74 |
| Registered electors | | 1,401 | | |
| Independent gain from Independent | | | | |
| Independent gain from Independent | | | | |
| Independent gain from Independent | | | | |
^{†} incumbent

=== Opuha ward ===
2025 Opuha ward election
| Party | Candidate | Votes | % | ±% |
|---|---|---|---|---|
| Independent | Rit Fisher^{†} | 812 | 78.99 | +5.08 |
| Independent | Phillipa Guerin^{†} | 762 | 74.12 | −8.73 |
| Independent | Mark Adams | 676 | 65.76 | (new) |
| Independent | Ash Jackson | 299 | 29.09 | (new) |
| Independent | Elizabeth McKenzie | 228 | 22.18 | (new) |
| Informal votes | | 1 | 0.10 | +0.10 |
| Blank votes | | 4 | 0.39 | −1.07 |
| Turnout | | 1,028 | 62.23 | +4.24 |
| Registered electors | | 1,652 | | |
| Independent hold | | | | |
| Independent hold | | | | |
| Independent gain from Independent | | | | |
^{†} incumbent

=== Tekapo ward ===
2025 Tekapo ward election
| Party | Candidate | Votes | % | ±% |
|---|---|---|---|---|
| Independent | Sue Allan | 161 | 65.45 | (new) |
| Independent | Maireire Norman | 83 | 33.74 | (new) |
| Informal votes | | 0 | 0.00 | n/a |
| Blank votes | | 2 | 0.81 | n/a |
| Turnout | | 246 | 58.71 | n/a |
| Registered electors | | 419 | | |
| Independent gain from Independent | | | | |

== Waimate District Council ==
2025 Waimate District Council election
- 11 October 2025
- Turnout: 2,954 (53.52% ▼0.87 pp)
- Mayor
| | Ind | Ind | Ind |
| Candidate | Craig Rowley | Sharyn Cain | Rick Stevens |
| Party | Independent | Independent | Independent |
| Popular vote | 1,090 | 1,043 | 791 |
| Percentage | 36.90% | 35.31% | 26.78% |
Mayor before election
Craig Rowley
Independent
Elected mayor
Craig Rowley
Independent
- Councillors
- 8 seats on the governing body of Waimate District Council; 5 seats needed for a majority
| Party | Seats | +/– |
|---|---|---|
| Independent | 8 | 0 |
This lists parties that won seats. See the complete results below.
| Control before | Control after |
|---|---|
| No majority | No majority |

=== 2025 Waimate mayoral election ===
2025 Waimate mayoral election
| Party | Candidate | Votes | % | ±% |
|---|---|---|---|---|
| Independent | Craig Rowley^{†} | 1,090 | 36.90 | −18.00 |
| Independent | Sharyn Cain | 1,043 | 35.31 | (new) |
| Independent | Rick Stevens | 791 | 26.78 | −14.85 |
| Informal votes | | 3 | 0.10 | +0.03 |
| Blank votes | | 27 | 0.91 | −1.70 |
| Turnout | | 2,954 | 53.52 | −0.87 |
| Registered electors | | 5,519 | | |
| Independent hold | | | | |
^{†} incumbent

=== Hakataramea-Waihaorunga ward ===
2025 Hakataramea-Waihaorunga ward election
| Party | Candidate | Votes | % | ±% |
|---|---|---|---|---|
| Independent | Paul Harrison | 186 | 75.61 | (new) |
| Independent | Margaret Wells | 58 | 23.58 | (new) |
| Informal votes | | 0 | 0.00 | n/a |
| Blank votes | | 2 | 0.81 | n/a |
| Turnout | | 246 | 48.62 | n/a |
| Registered electors | | 506 | | |
| Independent gain from Independent | | | | |

=== Pareora-Otaio-Makikihi ward ===
2025 Pareora-Otaio-Makikihi ward election
| Party | Candidate | Votes | % | ±% |
|---|---|---|---|---|
| Independent | Sandy McAlwee^{†} | 411 | 75.27 | n/a |
| Independent | Stacey Hall | 239 | 43.77 | (new) |
| Independent | Jon Bird | 220 | 40.29 | (new) |
| Informal votes | | 0 | 0.00 | n/a |
| Blank votes | | 6 | 1.10 | n/a |
| Turnout | | 546 | 44.03 | n/a |
| Registered electors | | 1,240 | | |
| Independent hold | | | | |
| Independent gain from Independent | | | | |
^{†} incumbent

=== Lower Waihao Ward ===
2025 Lower Waihao ward election
| Party | Candidate | Votes | % | ±% |
|---|---|---|---|---|
| Independent | Lisa Small^{†} | elected unopposed | | |
| Registered electors | | 578 | | |
| Independent hold | | | | |
^{†} incumbent

=== Waimate ward ===
2025 Waimate ward election
| Party | Candidate | Votes | % | ±% |
|---|---|---|---|---|
| Independent | Rick Stevens^{†} | 1,279 | 65.96 | +16.76 |
| Independent | John Begg^{†} | 1,204 | 62.09 | +15.56 |
| Independent | Jakki Guilford | 1,160 | 59.82 | (new) |
| Independent | Peter David Paterson | 1,159 | 59.77 | +22.03 |
| Independent | Brent Percy | 770 | 39.71 | (new) |
| Independent | Shane Gregoran | 747 | 38.53 | (new) |
| Informal votes | | 3 | 0.15 | −0.10 |
| Blank votes | | 23 | 1.19 | +0.64 |
| Turnout | | 1,939 | 60.69 | −0.62 |
| Registered electors | | 3,195 | | |
| Independent hold | | | | |
| Independent hold | | | | |
| Independent gain from Independent | | | | |
| Independent gain from Independent | | | | |
^{†} incumbent

== See also ==
- 2025 Environment Canterbury election
