= 2025 Christchurch City Council election =

Elections in New Zealand

- 11 October 2025
- Turnout: 107,475 (38.30% ▼6.06 pp)
- Mayor
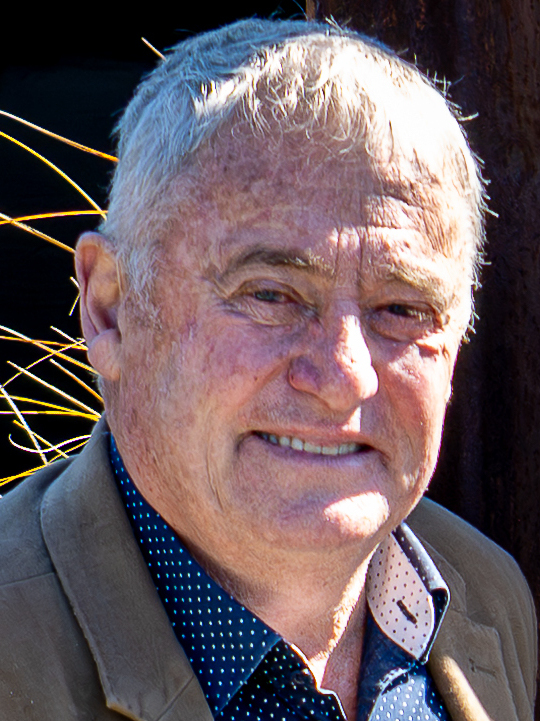

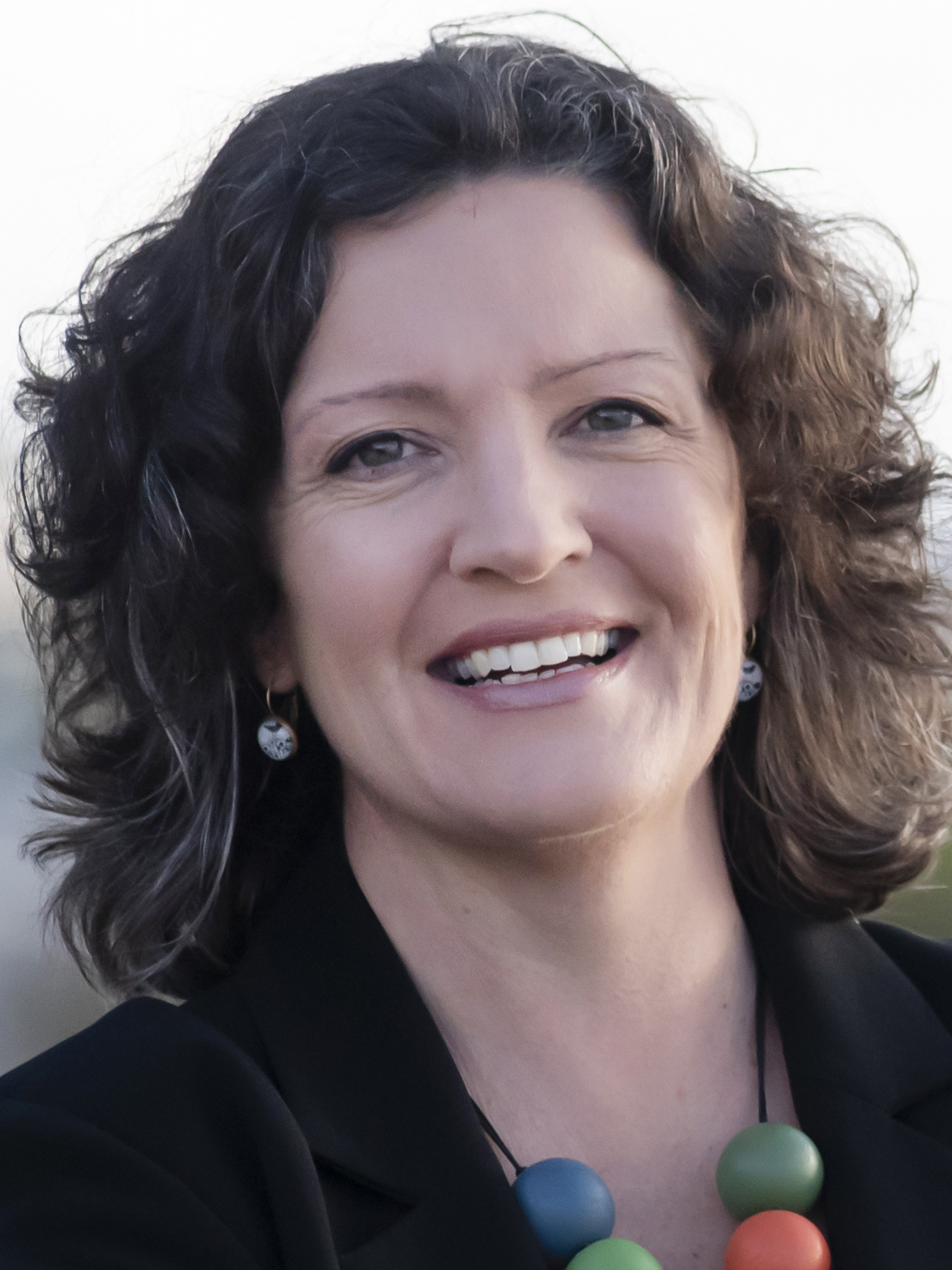
Candidate	Phil Mauger	Sara Templeton
Party	Independent	Independent
Popular vote	60,137	40,533
Percentage	55.95%	37.71%
Mayor before election
Phil Mauger
Independent
Elected mayor
Phil Mauger
Independent
- Councillors
- 16 seats on the governing body Christchurch City Council; 9 seats needed for a majority
Party	Seats	+/–
Independent	7	−1
The People's Choice and Labour	7	+1
Independent Citizens	2	0
This lists parties that won seats. See the complete results below.
Independent hold
PC / Labour hold PC / Labour gain
Independent Citizens hold
Control before	Control after
No majority	No majority

The 2025 Christchurch City Council election was a local election held from 9 September to 11 October in Christchurch, New Zealand, as part of that year's territorial authority elections and other local elections held nation-wide.

Voters elected the mayor of Christchurch, 16 city councillors, and other local representatives for the 2025–2028 term of the Christchurch City Council. Postal voting and the first-past-the-post voting system were used.

== Key dates ==
- 4 July 2025: Nominations for candidates opened
- 1 August 2025: Nominations for candidates closed at 12 noon
- 9 September 2025: Voting documents were posted and voting opened
- 11 October 2025: Voting closed at 12 noon and progress/preliminary results published
- 16–19 October 2025: Final results declared.

== Background ==
=== Positions up for election ===
Voters in the city elected the mayor of Christchurch, 16 councillors in 16 wards, and the members of six community boards. (Note: Waimāero Fendalton-Waimairi-Harewood; Waipapa Papanui-Innes-Central; Waihoro Spreydon-Cashmere-Heathcote; Waipuna Halswell-Hornby-Riccarton; Te Pātaka o Rākaihautū Banks Peninsula) They also elected several members of Environment Canterbury. (Note: 2 members each from the Christchurch North / Orēi, West / Ōpuna, Central / Ōhoko, and South / Ōwhanga constituencies).)

== List of candidates ==
=== Incumbents not seeking re-election ===
- Sara Templeton did not stand again in the Heathcote ward to focus on the mayoral campaign.
- James Gough, councillor for the Fendalton ward since 2010, had initially indicated that he would run for re-election but announced in late July that he would stand down to take up a role as executive director at The Terrace

=== Mayor ===
Incumbent mayor Phil Mauger announced he would stand for re-election. He would face Heathcote ward councillor Sara Templeton and perennial candidate Tubby Hansen.

=== Councillors ===
Each of the 16 wards returned one councillor to the city council. The People's Choice stood candidates in nine of the wards, including their six incumbents.

==== Harewood ward ====
Candidate	Affiliation (Note: A candidate may leave their affiliation blank, run as an independent, or run with an affiliation to an organisation, local body ticket or political party. Christchurch City Council does not allow whānau, hapū, or iwi details to be used for the affiliation.)	Notes
Aaron Keown	Independent Candidate for Harewood	Incumbent councillor

As the only candidate, Keown was re-elected unopposed.

==== Waimairi ward ====
Candidate	Photo	Affiliation	Notes
Sam MacDonald		Independent Citizens	Incumbent councillor

As the only candidate, MacDonald was re-elected unopposed.

==== Papanui ward ====
Candidate	Affiliation	Notes
Simon Britten	The People's Choice	Incumbent deputy chair of the Waipapa Papanui-Innes-Central Community Board. Endorsed by the Green Party.
Victoria Henstock	Your Local Independent Community Voice	Incumbent councillor

==== Fendalton ward ====
Candidate	Affiliation	Notes
David Cartwright	Independent Citizens	Incumbent Fendalton-Waimairi-Harewood community board member
Xavier Dickason	For Fendalton's Future	
Diane Ellis	Independent	

==== Innes ward ====
Candidate	Affiliation	Notes
Pauline Cotter	The People's Choice	Deputy mayor and councillor since 2013
Ali Jones	Independent	Waipapa Papanui-Innes-Central community board member since 2013, and former councillor 2013–2016.

==== Burwood ward ====
Candidate	Affiliation	Notes
Kelly Barber	Independent for Burwood	Incumbent councillor
Fionna Chapman	The People's Choice – Labour	Community worker

==== Coastal ward ====
Candidate	Photo	Affiliation	Notes
Taraia Brown		Independent	
Celeste Donovan		Independent	Incumbent councillor
Jo Zervos		Independent	Incumbent Waitai Coastal-Burwood-Linwood community board member

==== Hornby ward ====
Candidate	Affiliation	Notes
Mark Peters	Independent for Hornby	Incumbent councillor

As the only candidate, Peters was re-elected unopposed.

==== Halswell ward ====
Candidate	Affiliation	Notes
Andrei Moore	Independent	Incumbent councillor
Dylan Smart	Independent Citizens	

==== Riccarton ward ====
Candidate	Affiliation	Notes
Mark Chirnside	None	
Tyla Harrison-Hunt	The People's Choice	Incumbent since 2022
Debbie Mora	Independent – Back to Common Sense	Incumbent board member of the Waipuna Halswell-Hornby-Riccarton community board
Tony Simons	Independent – for Riccarton	Riccarton Bush-Kilmarnock Residents Association chair and former journalist
Sam Yau	Independent	

==== Spreydon ward ====
Candidate	Photo	Affiliation	Notes
Melanie Coker		The People's Choice – Labour	Incumbent since 2019
Terry Craze		Centre-right. People-Powered Voice	Previously ran for council in 2022
Tubby Hansen		Leave Commonwealth, leave Anzus	Perennial candidate since 1969. Also ran for mayor.
Ben Yorston		None	

==== Central ward ====
Candidate	Photo	Affiliation	Notes
Hayley Guglietta		Truly Independent	Community advocate
Raf Manji		Independent	Former councillor for the Fendalton-Waimairi Ward from 2013 to 2016 and Waimairi Ward from 2016 to 2019
Jake McLellan		Labour	Incumbent since 2019
Mace Reid		Independent	
Tom Roud		Alliance	Library worker and union delegate

==== Cashmere ward ====
Candidate	Affiliation	Notes
Clare Marks	Independent	
Tim Scandrett	Independent	Incumbent councillor

==== Linwood ward ====
Candidate	Photo	Affiliation	Notes
Evan Baker		Independent	
Ethan Gullery		Independent	
Yani Johanson		The People's Choice – Labour	Incumbent since 2007

==== Heathcote ward ====
Candidate	Affiliation	Notes
Nathaniel Herz Jardine	The People's Choice	Living wage advocate
Ian Kearney	Independent	Lawyer

==== Banks Peninsula ward ====
Candidate	Affiliation	Notes
Dave Dunlay	Independent for Banks Peninsula	Local media personality
Tyrone Fields	The People's Choice	Incumbent since 2022

=== Withdrawn candidates ===
- James Daniels, former councillor for the Coastal Ward from 2019 to 2021 had announced in May that he was standing for council again. However, in late July he withdrew from the race citing a change to his personal circumstances.

== Results ==
=== Composition ===
Ward	Previous	Elected
Mayor	Phil Mauger	Phil Mauger
Banks Peninsula	Tyrone Fields	Tyrone Fields
Burwood	Kelly Barber	Kelly Barber
Cashmere	Tim Scandrett	Tim Scandrett
Central	Jake McLellan	Jake McLellan
Coastal	Celeste Donovan	Celeste Donovan
Fendalton	James Gough^{R}	David Cartwright
Halswell	Andrei Moore	Andrei Moore
Harewood	Aaron Keown	Aaron Keown
Heathcote	Sara Templeton^{R}	Nathaniel Herz Jardine
Hornby	Mark Peters	Mark Peters
Innes	Pauline Cotter	Pauline Cotter
Linwood	Yani Johanson	Yani Johanson
Papanui	Victoria Henstock	Victoria Henstock
Riccarton	Tyla Harrison-Hunt	Tyla Harrison-Hunt
Spreydon	Melanie Coker	Melanie Coker
Waimairi	Sam MacDonald	Sam MacDonald
^{R} retired

=== Mayor ===
2025 Christchurch mayoral election
Party	Candidate	Votes	%	±%
Independent	Phil Mauger^{†}	60,137	55.95	+11.39
Independent	Sara Templeton	40,533	37.71	(new)
Independent	Thomas Healey	1,714	1.59	(new)
Independent	Nikora Nitro	1,525	1.42	+0.56
Independent	Blair Anderson	1,327	1.23	(new)
Independent	Phil Arps	448	0.42	(new)
Independent	Tubby Hansen	354	0.33	+0.09
Independent	P Wakeman	320	0.30	−0.50
Informal votes		105	0.10	+0.02
Blank votes		1,008	0.94	+0.16
Turnout		107,475	38.30	−6.06
Registered electors		280,587		
Independent hold				
^{†} incumbent

=== Council ===
==== Harewood ward ====
2025 Harewood ward election
Party	Candidate	Votes	%	±%
Independent	Aaron Keown^{†}	elected unopposed		
Registered electors		19,882		
Independent hold				
^{†} incumbent

==== Waimairi ward ====
2025 Waimairi ward election
Party	Candidate	Votes	%	±%
Independent Citizens	Sam MacDonald^{†}	elected unopposed		
Registered electors		17,376		
Independent Citizens hold				
^{†} incumbent

==== Papanui ward ====
2025 Papanui ward election
Party	Candidate	Votes	%	±%
Independent	Victoria Henstock^{†}	4,367	65.93	+3.97
People's Choice	Simon Britten	2,105	31.78	(new)
Informal votes		3	0.05	+0.03
Blank votes		149	2.25	−1.43
Turnout		6,624	36.91	−8.26
Registered electors		17,944		
Independent hold				
^{†} incumbent

==== Fendalton ward ====
2025 Fendalton ward election
Party	Candidate	Votes	%	±%
Independent Citizens	David Cartwright	5,228	66.43	(new)
Independent	Xavier Dickason	1,683	21.39	(new)
Independent	Diane Ellis	640	8.13	(new)
Informal votes		11	0.14	+0.13
Blank votes		308	3.91	+0.24
Turnout		7,870	41.85	−8.95
Registered electors		18,806		
Independent Citizens hold				

==== Innes ward ====
2025 Innes ward election
Party	Candidate	Votes	%	±%
People's Choice	Pauline Cotter^{†}	3,273	50.81	+11.40
Independent	Ali Jones	3,027	46.99	+7.81
Informal votes		3	0.05	−0.51
Blank votes		139	2.16	−1.48
Turnout		6,442	35.90	−3.48
Registered electors		17,944		
People's Choice hold				
^{†} incumbent

==== Burwood ward ====
2025 Burwood ward election
Party	Candidate	Votes	%	±%
Independent	Kelly Barber^{†}	5,390	77.06	+26.90
People's Choice/Labour	Fionna Chapman	1,455	20.80	(new)
Informal votes		1	0.01	−0.33
Blank votes		149	2.13	−1.55
Turnout		6,995	38.74	−6.67
Registered electors		18,057		
Independent hold				
^{†} incumbent

==== Coastal ward ====
2025 Coastal ward election
Party	Candidate	Votes	%	±%
Independent	Celeste Donovan^{†}	4,605	58.24	+10.87
Independent	Jo Zervos	2,844	35.97	(new)
Independent	Taraia Brown	333	4.21	(new)
Informal votes		12	0.15	−0.09
Blank votes		113	1.43	−0.91
Turnout		7,907	41.62	−5.74
Registered electors		18,999		
Independent hold				
^{†} incumbent

==== Hornby ward ====
2025 Hornby ward election
Party	Candidate	Votes	%	±%
Independent	Mark Peters^{†}	elected unopposed		
Registered electors		17,449		
Independent hold				
^{†} incumbent

==== Halswell ward ====
2025 Halswell ward election
Party	Candidate	Votes	%	±%
Independent	Andrei Moore^{†}	7,513	85.12	+23.29
Independent Citizens	Dylan Smart	1,161	13.15	(new)
Informal votes		4	0.05	−0.39
Blank votes		148	1.68	+0.06
Turnout		8,826	41.70	−7.77
Registered electors		21,165		
Independent hold				
^{†} incumbent

==== Riccarton ward ====
2025 Riccarton ward election
Party	Candidate	Votes	%	±%
People's Choice	Tyla Harrison-Hunt^{†}	1,657	40.16	+11.15
Independent	Tony Simons	1,139	27.61	(new)
Independent	Sam Yau	630	15.27	−0.88
Independent	Debbie Mora	366	8.87	(new)
Independent	Mark Chirnside	242	5.87	−3.09
Informal votes		16	0.39	−1.16
Blank votes		75	1.82	−2.17
Turnout		4,126	27.08	−3.90
Registered electors		15,234		
People's Choice hold				
^{†} incumbent

==== Spreydon ward ====
2025 Spreydon ward election
Party	Candidate	Votes	%	±%
People's Choice/Labour	Melanie Coker^{†}	4,315	73.22	+9.18
Independent	Ben Yorston	883	14.98	(new)
Independent	Terry Craze	410	6.96	−0.31
Independent	Tubby Hansen	99	1.68	−0.28
Informal votes		20	0.34	−0.16
Blank votes		166	2.82	−1.81
Turnout		5,893	33.06	−6.03
Registered electors		17,823		
People's Choice/Labour hold				
^{†} incumbent

==== Central ward ====
2025 Central ward election
Party	Candidate	Votes	%	±%
Labour	Jake McLellan^{†}	1,870	38.94	−11.23
Independent	Raf Manji	1,203	25.05	(new)
Independent	Hayley Guglietta	941	19.60	(new)
Alliance	Tom Roud	407	8.48	(new)
Independent	Mace Reid	235	4.89	(new)
Informal votes		42	0.87	+0.66
Blank votes		103	2.14	−2.20
Turnout		4,802	30.20	−2.41
Registered electors		15,902		
Labour hold				
^{†} incumbent

==== Cashmere ward ====
2025 Cashmere ward election
Party	Candidate	Votes	%	±%
Independent	Tim Scandrett^{†}	5,819	61.57	+18.03
Independent	Clare Marks	3,158	33.41	(new)
Informal votes		5	0.05	−0.43
Blank votes		469	4.96	+0.65
Turnout		9,451	46.83	−7.95
Registered electors		20,180		
Independent hold				
^{†} incumbent

==== Linwood ward ====
2025 Linwood ward election
Party	Candidate	Votes	%	±%
People's Choice/Labour	Yani Johanson^{†}	3,701	72.20	−3.46
Independent	Evan Baker	867	16.91	(new)
Independent	Ethan Gullery	443	8.64	(new)
Informal votes		14	0.27	+0.20
Blank votes		101	1.97	−2.42
Turnout		5,126	31.23	−3.90
Registered electors		16,413		
People's Choice/Labour hold				
^{†} incumbent

==== Heathcote ward ====
2025 Heathcote ward election
Party	Candidate	Votes	%	±%
People's Choice	Nathaniel Herz Jardine	5,206	57.35	(new)
Independent	Ian Kearney	3,594	39.59	(new)
Informal votes		7	0.08	−0.14
Blank votes		270	2.97	−2.14
Turnout		9,077	45.67	−2.70
Registered electors		19,876		
People's Choice gain from Independent				

==== Banks Peninsula ward ====
2025 Banks Peninsula ward election
Party	Candidate	Votes	%	±%
People's Choice	Tyrone Fields^{†}	2,952	71.84	+44.62
Independent	Dave Dunlay	1,062	25.85	(new)
Informal votes		0	0.00	−0.84
Blank votes		93	2.26	+0.35
Turnout		4,109	54.52	−7.28
Registered electors		7,537		
People's Choice hold				
^{†} incumbent
