= 2022 Christchurch City Council election =

Elections in New Zealand

- 8 October 2022

The 2022 Christchurch City Council election was held via postal voting between September and October 2022 as part of the wider 2022 New Zealand local elections.

== Council ==
Each ward of the Christchurch City Council returned one councillor to the city council. The first-past-the-post system was used to elect the Mayor of Christchurch and city councillors for the 2022–2025 term. Voter turnout was 43.31%. The positions of mayor and sixteen city councillors were contested by the following candidates:

=== Mayor ===
Incumbent three-term mayor Lianne Dalziel chose not to stand for a fourth term. Phil Mauger, first elected as a city councillor at the 2019 local elections, was elected to succeed her as mayor.

Candidate	Party	Votes	%
Phil Mauger	Let's Get Stuff Done	53,569	45.16
David Meates	Listens, Leads and Gets Results	51,298	43.24
Mark Chirnside	Chirny for Mayor	4,673	3.94
Carl Bromley	Independent – I Hear I Care	2,807	2.37
The Wizard of New Zealand	Independent	2,474	2.09
Nikora Nitro	Independent	1,035	0.87
Peter Wakeman	Independent	964	0.81
Drucilla Kingi-Patterson	Independent	800	0.67
Sam Park	Independent	479	0.40
Tubby Hansen	Economic Euthenics	293	0.25
Stephen Jelley	Stop The Stadium	237	0.20
Total		118,629	100.00
Valid votes		118,629	99.13
Invalid/blank votes		1,040	0.87
Total votes		119,669	100.00

=== Councillors ===
†Incumbent candidate

==== Harewood Ward ====
Candidate	Party	Votes	%
Aaron Keown†	Independent Voice of Harewood	6,714	76.87
Fiona Bennetts	Independent	1,782	20.40
Drucilla Kingi-Patterson	Independent	238	2.72
Total		8,734	100.00
Valid votes		8,734	95.62
Invalid/blank votes		400	4.38
Total votes		9,134	100.00

==== Waimairi Ward ====
Candidate	Party	Votes	%
Sam MacDonald†	Independent Citizens	4,787	64.55
Laly Samuel	Independent	1,785	24.07
Kevin List	Independent	844	11.38
Total		7,416	100.00
Valid votes		7,416	95.30
Invalid/blank votes		366	4.70
Total votes		7,782	100.00

==== Papanui Ward ====
Candidate	Party	Votes	%
Victoria Henstock	Your Local Independent Community Voice	5,074	64.56
Mike Davidson†	Independent	2,785	35.44
Total		7,859	100.00
Valid votes		7,859	96.29
Invalid/blank votes		303	3.71
Total votes		8,162	100.00

==== Fendalton Ward ====
Candidate	Party	Votes	%
James Gough†	Independent Citizens	6,132	68.73
Colin Meurk	Independent	2,790	31.27
Total		8,922	100.00
Valid votes		8,922	96.30
Invalid/blank votes		343	3.70
Total votes		9,265	100.00

==== Innes Ward ====
Candidate	Party	Votes	%
Pauline Cotter†	The People's Choice	2,653	41.40
Ali Jones	Independent	2,637	41.15
Mark Wilson	Independent Voice For Innes	729	11.38
Carl Bromley	Independent – I Hear I Care	389	6.07
Total		6,408	100.00
Valid votes		6,408	95.77
Invalid/blank votes		283	4.23
Total votes		6,691	100.00

==== Burwood Ward ====
Candidate	Party	Votes	%
Kelly Barber	Independent for Burwood	3,966	52.46
Michelle Lomax	Labour	2,624	34.71
Mike Wilson	A True Independent	970	12.83
Total		7,560	100.00
Valid votes		7,560	95.96
Invalid/blank votes		318	4.04
Total votes		7,878	100.00

==== Coastal Ward ====
Candidate	Party	Votes	%
Celeste Donovan†	Independent – Let's Make Waves	4,182	49.92
Kim Money	Independent	3,604	43.02
Don Cross	Independent	591	7.06
Total		8,377	100.00
Valid votes		8,377	95.14
Invalid/blank votes		428	4.86
Total votes		8,805	100.00

==== Hornby Ward ====
Candidate	Party	Votes	%
Mark Peters	Independent For Hornby	3,069	51.76
Kim Moss	The People's Choice – Labour	2,348	39.60
Derek Tait	Independent	512	8.64
Total		5,929	100.00
Valid votes		5,929	96.17
Invalid/blank votes		236	3.83
Total votes		6,165	100.00

==== Halswell Ward ====
Candidate	Party	Votes	%
Andrei Moore	Independent	5,735	63.31
Paul Lonsdale	Independent Citizens	2,154	23.78
Cissy Chen	Independent	772	8.52
Prawindra Mukhia	Independent	398	4.39
Total		9,059	100.00
Valid votes		9,059	97.94
Invalid/blank votes		191	2.06
Total votes		9,250	100.00

==== Riccarton Ward ====
Candidate	Party	Votes	%
Tyla Harrison-Hunt	The People's Choice	1,331	31.03
Sam Yau	Independent	741	17.27
Renée Walker	Independent Citizens	641	14.94
Peter Simmonds	Independent	541	12.61
Mark Chirnside	Chirny for Mayor	411	9.58
Fiona Jones	Independent	404	9.42
Luke Jones	Independent	221	5.15
Total		4,290	100.00
Valid votes		4,290	94.41
Invalid/blank votes		254	5.59
Total votes		4,544	100.00

==== Spreydon Ward ====
Candidate	Party	Votes	%
Melanie Coker†	The People's Choice – Labour	4,342	67.81
Sam Lu	Independent	1,435	22.41
Terry Craze	Independent	493	7.70
Tubby Hansen	Progressive Nudist	133	2.08
Total		6,403	100.00
Valid votes		6,403	94.85
Invalid/blank votes		348	5.15
Total votes		6,751	100.00

==== Central Ward ====
Candidate	Party	Votes	%
Jake McLellan†	Labour	2,384	53.11
Alexandra Davids	Independent	1,811	40.34
Stephen McPaike	Independent	294	6.55
Total		4,489	100.00
Valid votes		4,489	95.41
Invalid/blank votes		216	4.59
Total votes		4,705	100.00

==== Cashmere Ward ====
Candidate	Party	Votes	%
Tim Scandrett†	Truly Independent	4,734	45.90
Keir Leslie	The People's Choice – Labour	3,658	35.47
Colleen Farrelly	Independent	1,921	18.63
Total		10,313	100.00
Valid votes		10,313	95.19
Invalid/blank votes		521	4.81
Total votes		10,834	100.00

==== Linwood Ward ====
Candidate	Party	Votes	%
Yani Johanson†	The People's Choice – Labour	4,346	79.38
Sally Cogle	Independent	1,129	20.62
Total		5,475	100.00
Valid votes		5,475	95.53
Invalid/blank votes		256	4.47
Total votes		5,731	100.00

==== Heathcote Ward ====
Candidate	Party	Votes	%
Sara Templeton†	Strong Communities; Sustainable Future	5,336	60.19
Will Hall	Independent Voice For Heathcote	2,584	29.15
Rob Gray	Independent	945	10.66
Total		8,865	100.00
Valid votes		8,865	94.64
Invalid/blank votes		502	5.36
Total votes		9,367	100.00

==== Banks Peninsula Ward ====
Candidate	Party	Votes	%
Tyrone Fields	The People's Choice	1,267	28.27
Libby Ornsby	Best For Banks Peninsula	1,089	24.30
Victoria (Tori) Peden	Your Voice for Banks Peninsula	781	17.43
Scotty Winter	Independent	445	9.93
Nigel Harrison	Independent	418	9.33
Jeremy Dyer	Independent	325	7.25
JJ Smith	Independent	156	3.48
Total		4,481	100.00
Valid votes		4,481	97.22
Invalid/blank votes		128	2.78
Total votes		4,609	100.00

== Other local elections ==
Depending on where in Christchurch they lived, voters also voted in concurrent local elections for the:

- Environment Canterbury (Canterbury Regional Council):
  - Christchurch North / Ōrei constituency;
  - Christchurch West / Ōpuna constituency;
  - Christchurch Central / Ōhoko constituency; or
  - Christchurch South / Ōwhanga constituency; and
- Waimāero Fendalton-Waimairi-Harewood Community Board;
- Waipapa Papanui-Innes-Central Community Board;
- Waitai Coastal-Burwood-Linwood Community Board;
- Waihoro Spreydon-Cashmere-Heathcote Community Board;
- Waipuna Halswell-Hornby-Riccarton Community Board; or
- Te Pātaka o Rākaihautū Banks Peninsula Community Board.
