= Byron Clark =

New Zealand writer, video essayist, and researcher

- Years active: 2007–present
- Notable work: Fear: New Zealand's Hostile Underworld of Extremists

Byron C. Clark is a New Zealand writer, video essayist and researcher based in Christchurch, who specialises in documenting far-right, alt-right and conspiracy movements in New Zealand.

He is the author of Fear: New Zealand's Hostile Underworld of Extremists, and has written for outlets including Newsroom, The Spinoff, Overland and Fightback, as well as producing video essays on YouTube.

His research and commentary on extremism has made him a recurring target of harassment, including stalking, regular death threats, an alleged assassination plot timed to the release of his book, items left in his mailbox, sought restraining orders, been followed home, and someone gave a false name to gain entry to his workplace to film himself confronting Clark.

== Early life ==
Clark became politically active as a teenager around the time of the September 11 attacks, joining the movement against the Iraq War and, at the age of 18, a socialist organisation that was active in the late 2000s organising protests and conferences and contesting local and national elections. He edited an issue of the group's magazine, The Spark.

As a young activist he was involved in a fundraising campaign for a Palestinian militant group in the mistaken belief that it had renounced armed struggle for peaceful politics; the money was, by his own account, never collected by the group, and he has said the far-right has since used the episode to falsely claim he funded terrorism.

Clark has stood in elections for the Anti-Capitalist Alliance and the Workers Party of New Zealand.

Clark has described his own political radicalisation as following a left-wing path, and has said he does not reject being described as "far left", distinguishing this from the far-right on the grounds that the far-left seeks greater social and economic equality while the far right is rooted in white supremacy.

He has a background in oral history, having recorded an oral history of the Occupy movement in Christchurch.

== Activism ==
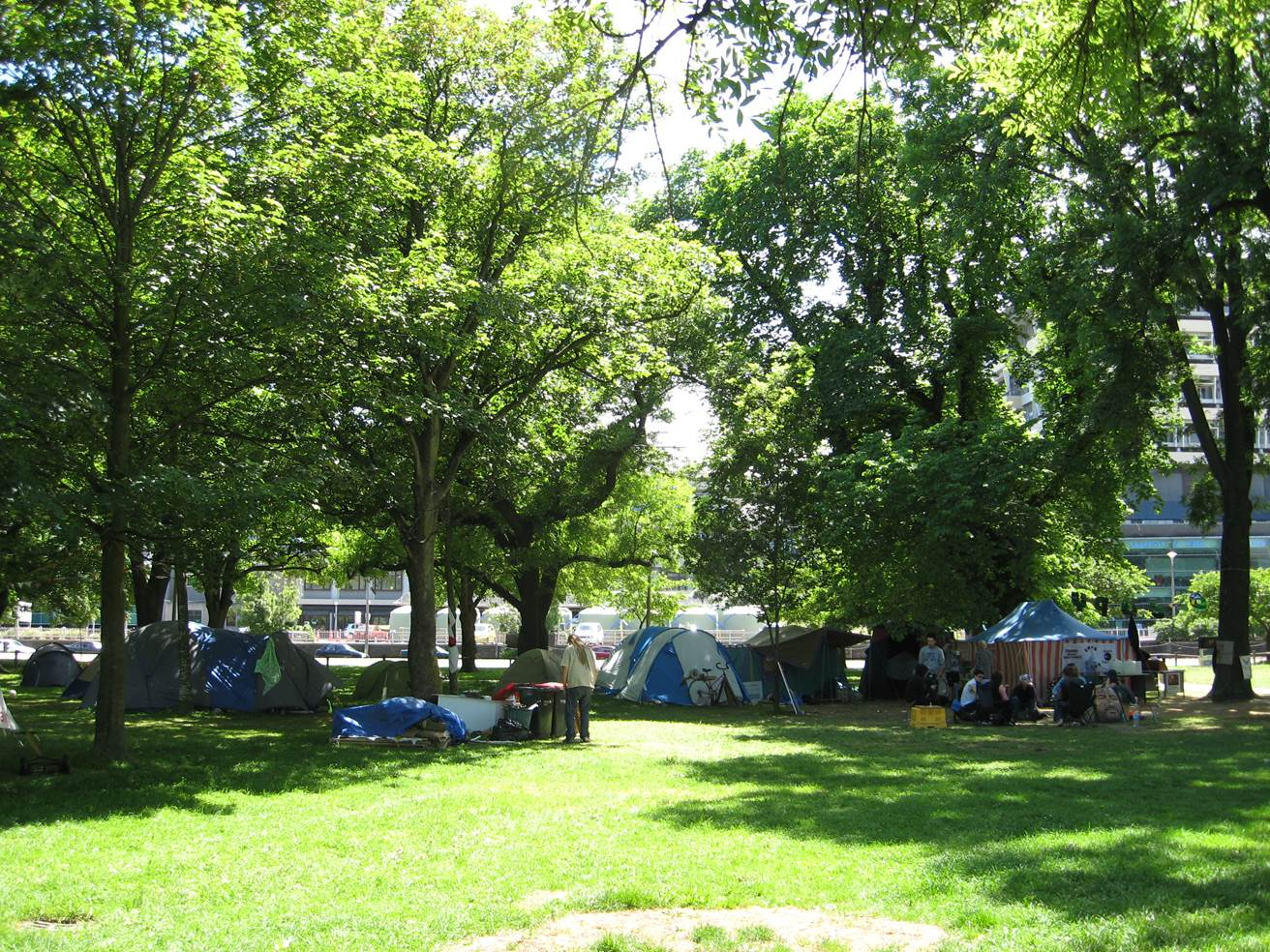
Occupy camp in Hagley Park, Christchurch, New Zealand, 2011

=== Video essays and early far-right research ===
Clark began producing YouTube videos discussing left-wing politics and the Occupy movement in the early 2010s, and started paying closer attention to alt-right groups from around 2016. Following the Christchurch mosque shootings of 15 March 2019, he shifted his YouTube channel's focus toward researching and debunking far-right conspiracy theories and disinformation, producing video essays explaining topics such as 5G conspiracy theories and COVID-19 disinformation. He has described his research method as monitoring "deep-web" far-right forums, YouTube channels and Telegram groups.

In 2021, Clark participated in Massey University's Centre for Culture-Centred Approach to Research and Evaluation (CARE) "Activist in Residence" programme, giving a public talk on the history of online hate ("Digital Hate in Aotearoa") and co-authoring a white paper, Anti-Social Networks: Hate and Misinformation Online and Strategies for Responding, with CARE director Professor Mohan Dutta.

Clark has written analysis of New Zealand far-right and conspiracist movements for Newsroom, including coverage of the rural conspiracist Agricultural Action Group and its links to Counterspin Media and the Groundswell farmer protest movement, and has written for The Spinoff on topics including women's roles in the alt-right and the "eat the bugs" climate-conspiracy narrative, the latter supported by a grant from the Bruce Jesson Foundation. He has also published academic and semi-academic writing, including a paper on media coverage of the 2022 Wellington protest'.

Parliament grounds and surrounding areas on 12 February 2022

Clark provided commentary as a far-right researcher during and after the 23-day occupation of Parliament grounds in Wellington in February–March 2022, appearing on RNZ's The Panel during the protest to discuss the range of groups involved. He later wrote that the occupation drew together disparate strands of far-right, anti-vaccine and conspiracist politics that he described using the term "River of Filth", after a much-debated phrase used by Cabinet minister Michael Wood in a parliamentary speech about the protest.

When the New Zealand government designated the American groups the Proud Boys and The Base as terrorist entities in 2022, Clark said the move reflected intelligence assessments that far-right terrorism posed a greater risk in New Zealand than Islamist terrorism, and cautioned that some small local groups shared ideology with the perpetrator of the Christchurch attacks.

=== Fear: New Zealand's Hostile Underworld of Extremists ===
In February 2023, Clark published Fear: New Zealand's Hostile Underworld of Extremists, a survey of far-right, alt-right and conspiracist groups and individuals active in New Zealand, including Action Zealandia, Voices for Freedom, Counterspin Media, QAnon-influenced networks, Groundswell NZ, and Hindutva-aligned organisations. The book's concluding chapter, published as an excerpt in Newsroom, frames the far-right and conspiracist movements that grew during the COVID-19 pandemic as a "dress rehearsal" for social responses to climate change.

Ahead of the book's release, its publisher decided against holding a public launch after Clark and police became aware of online discussion about a possible plot to assassinate him; Clark instituted a personal safety plan, including staying away from his home and workplace for a period, and carrying a personal alarm. Clark has said death threats are "pretty regular" in his line of work, and has previously sought restraining orders, been followed home, and had items left in his mailbox.

In 2019, the far-right YouTuber Lee Williams gave a false name to gain entry to Clark's workplace and filmed himself confronting Clark there; the footage was shared online, and Williams was later dismissed by his employer, dairy company Synlait, over racist comments made on his own YouTube channel.

In January 2024, Clark requested a restraining order against Philip Arps, who was in prison at the time. In July, the Christchurch District Court found that Clark's evidence had not directly stated that he feared for his own safety, and so dismissed his request. Clark, who had filed his request without a lawyer, thought that his fear ought to have been evident as his affidavit documented years of harassment and intimidation that he had endured from Arps. One example was a September 2023 post on Telegram in which Arps encouraged another man who had harassed him at work.

During the court hearing, Arps posted insults about Clark on social media. He had planned to speak in court, but left before the hearing ended while loudly insulting Clark.

==== Reception ====
Writing in The Conversation, University of Auckland extremism researcher Chris Wilson praised Fear as an "excellent and useful" book and a "crucial starting point" for understanding the New Zealand far-right, crediting Clark with "an unparalleled knowledge" of the network of groups and individuals involved. However, Wilson argued the book did not clearly define its central terms – "far right", "alt-right" and "extremism" – and used them interchangeably to describe groups he considered ideologically disparate, and that some chapters, including one on Hindutva-aligned organisations, asserted a domestic threat without sufficient New Zealand-specific evidence.

Massey University's Professor Mohan Dutta published a response to Wilson's review, arguing that Wilson's critique of the Hindutva chapter set an inconsistent evidentiary bar and that documented organisational links between the New Zealand Hindu Council and the India-based Vishva Hindu Parishad (VHP) constituted meaningful evidence of a threat to social cohesion. Dutta also praised Clark's record of research as, in his words, activism conducted mostly as unpaid labour, and highlighted Clark's history of confronting far-right harassment directly.

The book was also criticised from the political right; blogger David Farrar wrote on Kiwiblog in December 2023 that Clark's description of National MP James Meager, who grew up in a low-income household, as a "class traitor" undermined his standing as an "impartial expert" frequently interviewed by the media on extremism.

=== Commentary on other issues ===
In 2023, Clark wrote an open letter to New Zealand's Minister of Immigration, published by the New Zealand Herald, urging that anti-transgender activist Kellie-Jay Keen-Minshull (known as Posie Parker) be denied a visa to visit New Zealand. In it, Clark detailed links between Keen-Minshull's Australian speaking event and the neo-Nazi National Socialist Network, and between that group's leader and Christchurch mosque shooting perpetrator Brenton Tarrant.

Clark has also commented publicly on AI-generated social media content, including identifying a purportedly Aboriginal Australian TikTok and Instagram influencer, "Bush Legend", as an AI-generated persona operated from New Zealand. He has spoken to media about the "sovereign citizen movement" in New Zealand, including in relation to Richard Sivell, who was later convicted of threatening to kill then-Prime Minister Jacinda Ardern.

Clark has appeared as a commentator on RNZ, Newstalk ZB and other New Zealand broadcasters, and has spoken about media strategies for covering far-right and conspiracist figures without amplifying them, including in discussion of the Stuff Circuit documentary Fire & Fury.

== Reception and criticism ==
Clark's positioning as a media-cited "expert" on far-right extremism has drawn criticism from some commentators on the political right, who have characterised him as a partisan activist rather than a neutral analyst, and have criticised broadcasters for treating him as an impartial source.

Academic reviewers have generally credited Clark's research for its depth and access to far-right networks, while raising concerns, notably in Chris Wilson's review of Fear, about definitional clarity and the strength of evidence for some of the book's claims, particularly regarding groups not conventionally classified as far right.

== Personal life ==
Clark lives in Christchurch, New Zealand.

== Electoral history ==
=== 2005 Christchurch Central ===
2005 general election: Christchurch Central
Notes:	Blue background denotes the winner of the electorate vote. Pink background denotes a candidate elected from their party list. Yellow background denotes an electorate win by a list member, or other incumbent. A ✓ or ✗ denotes status of any incumbent, win or lose respectively.						
Party	Candidate	Votes	%	±%	Party votes	%	±%
Labour	✓ Tim Barnett	17,685	52.57		16,652	48.31	
National	Nicky Wagner	9,849	29.28		10,515	30.51	
Green	Natalie Cutler-Welsh	2,236	6.65		3,342	9.70	
Progressive	Megan Woods	1,077	3.20		643	1.87	
NZ First	Kevin Gardener	1,022	3.04		1,391	4.04	
United Future	John van Buren	761	2.26		1,048	3.04	
ACT	Shirley Marshall	340	1.01		364	1.06	
Destiny	Anita Breach	338	1.01		144	0.42	
Māori Party	Darryl Gregory	188	0.56		116	0.34	
Anti-Capitalist Alliance	Byron Clark	90	0.27				
Communist League	Annalucia Vermunt	53	0.16				
Legalise Cannabis					125	0.36	
Alliance					40	0.12	
Christian Heritage					37	0.11	
Democrats					15	0.04	
99 MP					10	0.03	
Libertarianz					9	0.03	
Direct Democracy					7	0.02	
RONZ					5	0.01	
Family Rights					4	0.01	
One NZ					2	0.01	
Informal votes		410			193		
Total valid votes		33,639			34,469		
Labour hold	Majority	7,836					

=== 2007 Christchurch mayoral election ===
2007 Christchurch mayoral election
Party	Candidate	Votes	%	±%
Independent	Bob Parker	47,033	45.44	
Christchurch 2021	Megan Woods	32,821	31.71	
Christchurch City Vision	Jo Giles	14,454	13.96	
Independent	Mark Ross	4,505	4.35	
Independent	Peter Wakeman	1,868	1.80	
Independent	Blair Anderson	898	0.87	−0.07
Workers Party	Byron Clark	720	0.70	
National Front	Kyle Chapman	680	0.66	−1.24
Independent	Paul Telfer	295	0.29	−1.49
Independent	Michael Hansen	228	0.22	−0.20
Informal votes		229	0.22	−0.06
Rejected ballots		1,544	1.47	-2.20
Majority		14,212	13.73	−42.90

=== 2008 Christchurch Central ===
2008 general election: Christchurch Central
Notes:	Blue background denotes the winner of the electorate vote. Pink background denotes a candidate elected from their party list. Yellow background denotes an electorate win by a list member, or other incumbent. A ✓ or ✗ denotes status of any incumbent, win or lose respectively.						
Party	Candidate	Votes	%	±%	Party votes	%	±%
Labour	Brendon Burns	14,078	43.83	−8.74	12,999	39.36	−8.95
National	Nicky Wagner	13,143	40.92	+11.65	12,409	37.58	+7.07
Green	Jan McLauchlan	2,708	8.43	+1.78	3,688	11.17	+1.47
Progressive	Somnath Bagchi	598	1.86	−1.34	697	2.11	+0.25
Legalise Cannabis	Michael Britnell	487	1.52	–	187	0.57	+0.20
ACT	Toni Severin	482	1.50	+0.49	897	2.72	+1.66
Kiwi	Andrew Beaven	353	1.10	–	218	0.66	–
Workers Party	Byron Clark (Note: Byron Clark contested the seat in the 2005 election for the same party, which was then called the Anti-Capitalist Alliance.)	164	0.51	+0.24	33	0.10	
Alliance	Greg Kleis	103	0.32	–	41	0.12	+0.01
NZ First					1,036	3.14	−0.90
United Future					239	0.72	−2.32
Māori Party					230	0.70	0.36
Bill and Ben					187	0.57	–
Family Party					87	0.26	–
Pacific					31	0.09	–
Libertarianz					21	0.06	+0.04
Democrats					16	0.05	+0.00
RONZ					5	0.02	+0.00
RAM					2	0.01	–
Informal votes		306			119		
Total valid votes		32,116			33,023		
Labour hold	Majority	935	2.91	−20.38			

== Bibliography ==
- Clark, Byron C. (2023). Fear: New Zealand's Hostile Underworld of Extremists. Auckland: HarperCollins New Zealand. ISBN 9781775542308.

== See also ==
- Far-right politics in New Zealand
