= Selwyn District Council =

Territorial authority of New Zealand

Coordinates: 43.3167842°S 170.74955°E

Selwyn District Council Te Kaunihera ā-Rohe o Waikirikiri
- Seal

- Brand logo

Type
- Type: Territorial authority of Selwyn District
- Term limits: None

History
- Established: 1 November 1989; 36 years ago
- Preceded by: Malvern County Council; Ellesmere County Council; Paparua County Council
- New session started: 17 October 2025

Leadership
- Mayor: Lydia Gliddon, Ind. since 17 October 2025
- Deputy: Big Red Shefford, Ind. since 29 October 2025
- CEO: Steve Gibling since 19 January 2026

Structure
- Seats: 11 (including mayor)
- Political groups: Independent (11)
- Length of term: 3 years

Elections
- Voting system: First past the post
- First election: 14 October 1989
- Last election: 11 October 2025
- Next election: 14 October 2028

Meeting place
- 2 Norman Kirk Dr, Rolleston

Website
- selwyn.govt.nz

Selwyn District Council (abbr. SDC; Māori: Te Kaunihera ā-Rohe o Waikirikiri) is the territorial authority for the Selwyn District of New Zealand. It serves as the district's local government alongside Environment Canterbury as the regional council. The current entity has existed since 1989, prior to which local government in the area was split between three counties.

The governing body of the council has 10 councillors and is chaired by the mayor of Selwyn (currently Lydia Gliddon since October 2025).

== Governing body ==
=== Mayor ===
One mayor is elected at-large; they chair meetings of the governing body and act as the head of local government in the district.

=== Current composition ===
The current members of the governing body of council are:

| Role | Portrait | Name | Affiliation | Ward |
|---|---|---|---|---|
| Mayor | | Lydia Gliddon | Independent | Elected at-large |
| Deputy | | Big Red Shefford | Independent | Rolleston |
| Councillor | | Rhys Laraman | Independent | Rolleston |
| Councillor | | Sophie McInnes | Independent | Rolleston |
| Councillor | | Elizabeth Mundt | Independent | Ellesmere |
| Councillor | | John Verry | Independent | Malvern |
| Councillor | | Sarah Barnsley | Independent | Springs |
| Councillor | | Denis Carrick | Independent | Springs |
| Councillor | | Aaron McGlinchy | Independent | Springs |
| Councillor | | Tracey MacLeod | Independent | At-large |
| Councillor | | Samuel Willshire | Independent | At-large |

== Community boards ==
=== Malvern Community Board (5) ===
- Tawera Community Subdivision (1): Sean Ellis
- Hawkins Subdivision (2): Ken May, Sharn Nu'u
- West Melton Subdivision (2): Calvin Payne, Bruce Russell

== Elections ==
Councillors are elected once every three years, using the first-past-the post system. The last election to take place was in October 2025.

=== List ===
==== Mayoral ====
- 1989
- 1992
- 1995
- 1998
- 2001
- 2004
- 2007
- 2010
- 2013
- 2016
- 2019
- 2022
- 2025

==== Council ====
- 1989
- 1992
- 1995
- 1998
- 2001
- 2004
- 2007
- 2010
- 2013
- 2016
- 2019
- 2022
- 2025
