= Toni Severin =

New Zealand politician

Member of the New Zealand Parliament for ACT party list
- In office 17 October 2020 – 14 October 2023

Personal details
- Party: ACT

Toni Gae Severin is a New Zealand politician. First elected during the 2020 New Zealand general election, she served as a Member of Parliament for ACT New Zealand from 2020 until 2023. She was unseated during the 2023 New Zealand general election. Severin subsequently contested the 2025 Environment Canterbury election as an ACT Local candidate and the 2026 general election but was unsuccessful.

== Early life and career ==
Severin grew up in Invercargill. After moving to Christchurch, she worked as a laboratory technician for Canterbury District Health Board for 14 years. At the age of 21, she was diagnosed with dyslexia. Later, she completed a diploma in marketing at Christchurch Polytechnic.

Severin is a business owner with her husband, Richard. The Companies Register shows her as director and shareholder of Vess 2013, a residential rental company, and Jet-X Wellington, which steam-cleans building exteriors. Severin continued to be involved with these companies through her political career, as shown by a June 2023 report on MPs' financial interest disclosures. A third company, Unique Links NZ, a jewellery wholesaling company, was removed from the Companies Register in 2021 for failing to file an annual return.

== Political career ==
Severin unsuccessfully contested four elections for ACT before finally being elected a member of Parliament in 2020.

In the 2008, 2011 and 2014 elections, she was selected for Christchurch Central. Her party list placement in 2008 was 54th and she finished sixth of nine candidates in the electorate. In 2011, she was ranked 17th on the party list and finished last of six electorate candidates. In 2014, she was placed 11th on the party list and came sixth of eight candidates.

Severin transferred to Christchurch East for the 2017 general election and was placed 10th on the ACT party list. She was last out of the seven candidates.

=== Member of Parliament ===
New Zealand Parliament
Years	Term	Electorate	List	Party
2020–2023	53rd	List	9	ACT

In the 2020 general election, Severin contested Christchurch East for a second time, and was ninth on the party list. She finished fourth of nine candidates in Christchurch East, but ACT won 7.6% of the party vote. This entitled it to ten MPs, including Severin.

Severin was a member of the Health and the Regulations Review select committees. She was ACT's spokesperson on ACC, corrections, and disability issues.

Severin outlined her political philosophy and priorities in her maiden statement. She championed free marketing and deregulation, and stated her intention to advocate on behalf of small business in Parliament.

For the 2023 general election, ACT moved Severin down its party list from 9th to 14th, which was not a high enough ranking for her to be re-elected. She also unsuccessfully contested Christchurch East, coming fifth place with 1,679 votes.

=== 2025 Environment Canterbury election ===
During the 2025 Environment Canterbury election, Severin stood in the South Canterbury/Ōtuhituhi constituency under the ACT Local banner. She was unsuccessful, coming third place with 7,755 votes.

=== 2026 general election ===
During the 2026 New Zealand general election, Severin was ranked 39th place on the ACT party list and contested the Christchurch East electorate. On 7 November, she came fifth place in the Christchurch East race with 1,373 votes, based on preliminary results. Due to her low party list ranking, Severin was not re-elected to Parliament on the ACT party list.

== Political views ==
Severin is a licensed gun owner and believes the gun control laws passed after the Christchurch mosque attack was rushed and would not have prevented the attack. Severin delayed receiving her COVID-19 vaccination after seeking medical advice due to a pre-existing condition.
