= 2025 Environment Canterbury election =

Local election in New Zealand

- 11 October 2025
- Turnout: 192,920 (41.6%)
- 14 seats of Environment Canterbury; 8 seats needed for a majority
Party	Vote %	Seats	+/–
Independent	78.92	11	−1
The People's Choice	18.57	3	+1
This lists parties that won seats. See the complete results below.

The 2025 Environment Canterbury election was a local election held from 9 September to 11 October in the Canterbury region of New Zealand, as part of that year's regional council elections and other local elections held nation-wide.

Voters elected 14 regional councillors for the 2025–2028 term of Environment Canterbury, commonly referred to as ECan. Postal voting and the first past the post voting system were used. ECan has 14 elected councillors and 2 councillors appointed by Ngāi Tahu, with the latter an arrangement in various forms dating back to 2010.

== Key dates ==
- 4 July 2025: Nominations for candidates opened.
- 1 August 2025: Nominations for candidates closed at 12pm.
- 9 September 2025: Voting documents were posted and voting opened.
- 11 October 2025: Voting closed at noon and preliminary results released.
- 16 October 2025: Final results will be declared.

== Background ==
=== Chairperson during the previous triennium ===
Following the 2022 Environment Canterbury election, councillors Peter Scott and Craig Pauling were nominated for the role of chairperson. The vote was tied and Scott became chair through a draw. On 3 May 2024, Scott stepped down as chair after admitting he was illegally irrigating part of his South Canterbury farm during a Newstalk ZB radio interview. Environment Canterbury commissioned an independent investigation into Scott's activities. Pauling became acting chair following Scott's resignation. Scott resumed his role as chair in July, but stepped down again in September after it was revealed he had exceeded the speed limit 678 times in his council-provided car since January.

=== Ngāi Tahu representation ===
The Fifth National Government sacked the Environment Canterbury councillors and replaced them with commissioners. Initially, one of the commissioners—Donald Couch—was appointed on the recommendation of Ngāi Tahu. Couch was later replaced by Elizabeth Cunningham. The arrangement was formalised through the Environment Canterbury (Transitional Governance Arrangements) Act 2016, which specified that two commissioners appointed must be recommended by Ngāi Tahu. When the commissioners retired in 2019 and ECan returned to a fully elected council, an attempt was made to secure two permanent Ngāi Tahu seats on the council, but a local bill was defeated in parliament. In response, two mana whenua experts were appointed—Yvette Couch-Lewis and Iaean Cranwell—who did not have voting rights, but advised at council and committee meetings. The Canterbury Regional Council (Ngāi Tahu Representation) Act 2022 was passed by the Sixth Labour Government. It allows Ngāi Tahu to appoint two representatives to ECan with full voting rights, bringing the number of council members to sixteen. The Sixth National Government asked ECan to repeal the 2022 act; as a local act, it is up to ECan to make a request to have the legislation changed. ECan councillors voted to reject the government's request, with only Cr David East supporting the government's approach. Consequently, ECan has 14 elected councillors and 2 councillors appointed by Ngāi Tahu.

=== Incumbents not seeking re-election ===
- Greg Byrnes decided to retire at the end of the term.
- Paul Dietsche did not put his name forward for another term.
- Craig Pauling, the outgoing chair, announced on the morning of nomination day that he was standing down.
- Vicky Southworth's name wasn't part of the nominations received.

== Results ==
Fourteen councillors were elected to Environment Canterbury across seven constituencies, with two councillors per constituency.

=== North Canterbury/Ōpukepuke constituency ===
Based on progress results released on election day, councillor Grant Edge failed to get re-elected.

2025 North Canterbury/Ōpukepuke constituency election
Party	Candidate	Votes	%	±%
Independent	Claire McKay^{†}	11,990	44.74	−4.54
Independent	John Faulkner	9,901	36.94	(new)
Independent	Grant Edge^{†}	9,624	35.91	−6.50
Independent	Tane Apanui	6,151	22.95	(new)
Independent	Frankie Karetai Wood-Bodley	4,357	16.26	(new)
Informal votes		74	0.28	+0.20
Blank votes		3,314	12.37	+0.80
Turnout		26,800	43.38	−2.68
Registered electors		61,786		
Independent hold				
Independent gain from Independent				
^{†} incumbent

=== Christchurch West/Ōpuna constituency ===
2025 Christchurch West/Ōpuna constituency election
Party	Candidate	Votes	%	±%
Independent	Deon Swiggs^{†}	14,806	51.01	+17.65
People's Choice	Sara Gerard	14,453	49.79	(new)
Independent	Michael Bennett	8,629	29.73	(new)
People's Choice	Colin Meurk	8,115	27.96	(new)
Informal votes		5	0.02	+0.00
Blank votes		2,148	7.40	−2.25
Turnout		29,028	38.27	−7.47
Registered electors		75,844		
Independent hold				
People's Choice gain from Independent				
^{†} incumbent

=== Mid-Canterbury/Ōpākihi constituency ===
2025 Mid-Canterbury/Ōpākihi constituency election
Party	Candidate	Votes	%	±%
Independent	Ian Mackenzie^{†}	18,725	50.56	−6.99
Independent	John Sunckell^{†}	16,001	43.20	−7.59
Independent	Helen Troy	14,391	38.86	(new)
Independent	Peter Trolove	12,287	33.17	−2.49
Informal votes		54	0.15	−0.21
Blank votes		2,549	6.88	+0.22
Turnout		37,037	47.71	+2.03
Registered electors		77,633		
Independent hold				
Independent hold				
^{†} incumbent

=== South Canterbury/Ōtuhituhi constituency ===
With both incumbents having retired, two new councillors were elected in this constituency.

2025 South Canterbury/Ōtuhituhi constituency election
Party	Candidate	Votes	%	±%
Independent	Nick Ward^{†}	13,854	63.60	+14.40
Independent	Peter Scott^{†}	9,502	43.62	−3.74
ACT Local	Toni Severin	7,755	35.60	(new)
Informal votes		3	0.01	−0.10
Blank votes		1,958	8.99	−1.60
Turnout		21,783	49.84	−0.48
Registered electors		43,707		
Independent hold				
Independent hold				
^{†} incumbent

=== Christchurch North East/Ōrei constituency ===
Based on progress results released on election day, councillor David East failed to get re-elected. Davies supported candidates in constituencies where The People's Choice had stood no candidates. TPC took issue with this behaviour and expelled Davies on 6 November 2025 from the ticket.

2025 Christchurch North East/Ōrei constituency election
Party	Candidate	Votes	%	±%
Independent	Ashley Campbell	11,351	42.93	+12.63
People's Choice/Labour	Joe Davies^{†}	10,991	41.57	+3.89
Independent	David East^{†}	10,569	39.97	−18.69
People's Choice/Labour	Peter Langlands	8,907	33.69	(new)
Informal votes		6	0.02	+0.00
Blank votes		1,202	4.55	−5.46
Turnout		26,442	37.04	+0.00
Registered electors		71,384		
Independent gain from Independent				
People's Choice/Labour hold				
^{†} incumbent

=== Christchurch Central/Ōhoko constituency ===
2025 Christchurch Central/Ōhoko constituency election
Party	Candidate	Votes	%	±%
Independent	Genevieve Robinson^{†}	8,617	36.87	−5.66
Independent	Nettles Lamont	8,263	35.36	(new)
Independent	Alexandra Davids	6,623	28.34	(new)
Independent	Lindon Boyce	4,331	18.53	+11.49
Independent	Ross Boswell	41,448	177.36	(new)
Independent	Benjamin Alexander	3,567	15.26	(new)
Independent	Alan (Huijian) Wang	3,255	13.93	(new)
Informal votes		16	0.07	+0.04
Blank votes		1,602	6.85	−3.24
Turnout		23,370	34.45	−3.54
Registered electors		67,829		
Independent hold				
Independent gain from Independent				
^{†} incumbent

=== Christchurch South/Ōwhanga constituency ===
2025 Christchurch South/Ōwhanga constituency election
Party	Candidate	Votes	%	±%
People's Choice	Andrea Davis	14,960	52.57	(new)
Independent	Nick Moody	11,288	39.66	(new)
Independent	Mananui Ramsden	8,649	30.39	(new)
Independent	Bill Kingston	4,527	15.91	(new)
Independent	Mike Okey	3,587	12.60	(new)
Independent	Philip Robinson	2,752	9.67	(new)
Independent	John McLister	2,310	8.12	(new)
Informal votes		17	0.06	+0.03
Blank votes		1,465	5.15	−4.60
Turnout		28,460	43.56	−5.94
Registered electors		65,342		
People's Choice gain from Independent				
Independent gain from Independent				

== Election of chairperson ==
At the inaugural meeting of a newly elected council, a chairperson and deputy chair are elected by the council members. On 29 October 2025, Deon Swiggs was elected chair unopposed. Claire McKay, Nettles Lamont, and Iaean Cranwell were nominated for the deputy role, with Cranwell winning the election.
