= Sara Templeton =

New Zealand local politician (born 1971)

Councillor Sara Templeton
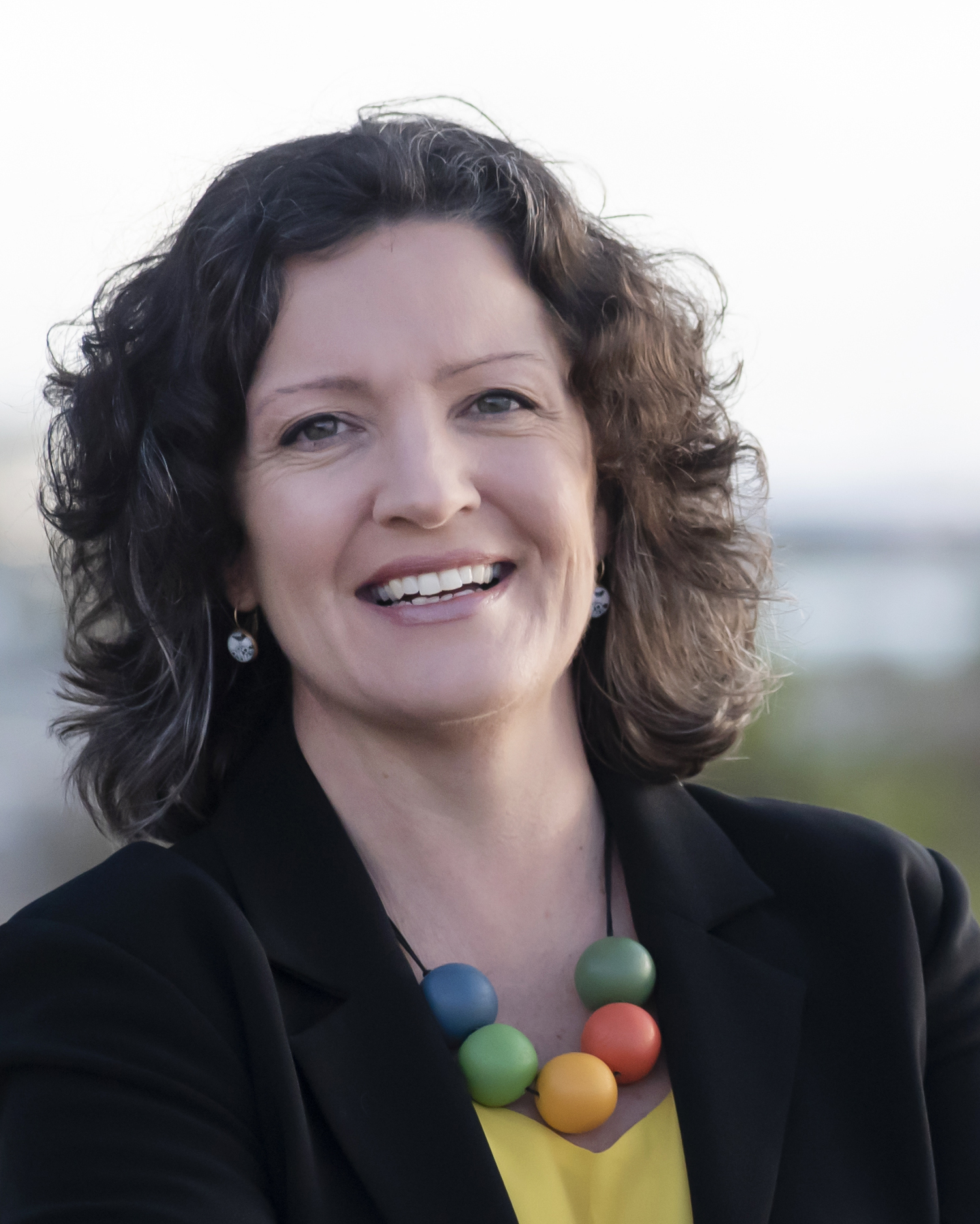
- Templeton in 2019 wearing her Sustainable Development Goals necklace

Member of the Christchurch City Council for the Heathcote ward
- Incumbent
- Assumed office 15 October 2016
- Preceded by: Paul Lonsdale

Personal details
- Born: 23 November 1971 (age 54)
- Party: Strong Communities; Sustainable Future
- Education: University of Canterbury
- Templeton's voice recorded March 2025

Sara Louise Templeton (née Beswick, born 23 November 1971) is a New Zealand politician and former member of the Christchurch City Council. A former teacher and small business owner, Templeton was first elected to the Hagley–Ferrymead community board in 2013 and was councillor for the Heathcote ward since 2016 until 2025. She relinquished her seat on the council in 2025 to focus on running for the mayoralty, which she lost to incumbent Phil Mauger.

== Early life and education ==
Sara Louise Beswick was born in Christchurch in 1971 to Ian and Kathy Beswick. She was educated at Burnside High School and Onslow College. She earned a Bachelor of Arts in English from the University of Canterbury in 1995. She was a secondary school English and drama teacher before entering local politics, and also owned an eco-friendly baby wipes business.

Living in Heathcote Valley near the epicentre of the 2011 earthquake, Templeton was one of a number of local community leaders who helped with earthquake recovery, and she helped establish a community garden behind St Mary's Church. She was awarded a Civic Earthquake Award for services to the community presented by Mayor Bob Parker on 18 December 2012. Templeton co-edited a book with Sooze Harris, published in 2016, Heathcote: The Upside: Community Creativity, Innovation and Initiative in Response to the Christchurch Earthquakes. The book details the community-led projects in the Heathcote Valley in the first five years after the Christchurch earthquakes. She served as chair of the Heathcote Valley Community Association.

== Political career ==
=== Community board and councillor ===
Templeton entered politics when she was elected to the Hagley-Ferrymead community board in 2013. She was nominated as chair of the board during her term. In 2015, plans by the Canterbury Earthquake Recovery Authority to revamp Victoria Square generated significant public upset, forcing a period of public consultation on the proposed changes. An independent reference group was set up, which Templeton chaired, and this led to a new restoration plan being launched in September 2016.

In 2016 Templeton stood for election as a councillor in the Heathcote ward. She ran under the banner of 'Strong Communities for a Stronger Christchurch' and won the election by a margin of more than 1500 votes, unseating sitting councillor Paul Lonsdale.

Templeton was re-elected to council in 2019 and won a third term in 2022. In her second and third terms, Templeton was appointed a director of Christchurch City Holdings, a company which manages around $3 billion of council assets. She resigned as director in 2025, after five years.

Templeton is a former Green Party member and is known for her advocacy on climate change issues, including public and active transport. She holds the council's climate change portfolio and previously chaired the council's sustainability and community resilience committee. When the council's 2023 draft long-term plan removed all funding for cycleways, she said: "I expect to see an option presented that helps us meet our approved emissions reduction targets. Short-term thinking is a disservice to our communities facing the challenges of a climate-impacted future.”

In 2021, Templeton requested the council remove library fines at Christchurch City libraries, as she believed they disadvantaged some groups. The policy was adopted in March 2022. In 2022 Templeton was one of three councillors to vote against increasing the budget for the Te Kaha stadium. She objected on the basis that the additional cost would be born by ratepayers, either though rates increases or cuts to services.

=== Mayoral candidacy ===
In 2022 it was suggested that Templeton might be considering running for mayor when Lianne Dalziel retires. However, Templeton did not run and later said she had declined to run because she had been recovering from melanoma. In October 2024 Templeton announced that she would contest the Christchurch mayoralty at the 2025 New Zealand local elections as an independent candidate. She would not stand again in the Heathcote ward to focus on the mayoral campaign.

On 11 October 2025 it was announced that Templeton had lost the mayoralty race with the incumbent Phil Mauger being re-elected in a landslide victory, beating Templeton by a margin of over 19,000 votes when progress results were announced. Final results were announced on 16 October 2025, showing a margin of 19,604 votes between the two candidates.

== Online harassment ==
In July 2021, during her second term as a city councillor, Templeton revealed to the media that she was the target of online harassment from two Facebook accounts with fake names. When the accounts were blocked from her page, they began a smear campaign against her by messaging and posting misinformation about her on other pages. They also attempted to get access to her personal Facebook page through the Official Information Act, and when they were denied, one of them complained to the Ombudsman. The same Facebook accounts were also responsible for targeting politicians Sarah Pallett and Megan Woods. Templeton complained to the District Court and investigations traced the IP address to a house owned by New Zealand National Party member Bryce Beattie. His housemate Jessee Mackenzie admitted to the harassment and both Beattie and Mackenzie resigned from the Young Nats, and Beattie withdrew as an independent candidate in the local elections.

In August 2023, Templeton said she had to increase her home security after online comments targeted her, after she laid a code of conduct complaint against fellow councillor Aaron Keown.

== Personal life ==
Templeton lives in the Heathcote Valley and travels to work by bus or bicycle. Templeton often wears a wooden necklace that represents the UN sustainable development goals that are most important to her, which are good health and wellbeing, gender equality, sustainable cities and communities, climate action, and peace, justice and strong institutions.

Templeton has three children. She co-parents with her husband, who she is separated from.

== Electoral history ==
=== Christchurch City Council ===
==== 2025 Christchurch mayoral election ====
2025 Christchurch mayoral election
Party	Candidate	Votes	%	±%
Independent	Phil Mauger^{†}	60,137	55.95	+11.39
Independent	Sara Templeton	40,533	37.71	(new)
Independent	Thomas Healey	1,714	1.59	(new)
Independent	Nikora Nitro	1,525	1.42	+0.56
Independent	Blair Anderson	1,327	1.23	(new)
Independent	Phil Arps	448	0.42	(new)
Independent	Tubby Hansen	354	0.33	+0.09
Independent	P Wakeman	320	0.30	−0.50
Informal votes		105	0.10	+0.02
Blank votes		1,008	0.94	+0.16
Turnout		107,475	38.30	−6.06
Registered electors		280,587		
Independent hold				
^{†} incumbent
