= Phil Mauger =

47th Mayor of Christchurch, New Zealand

His Worship Phil Mauger
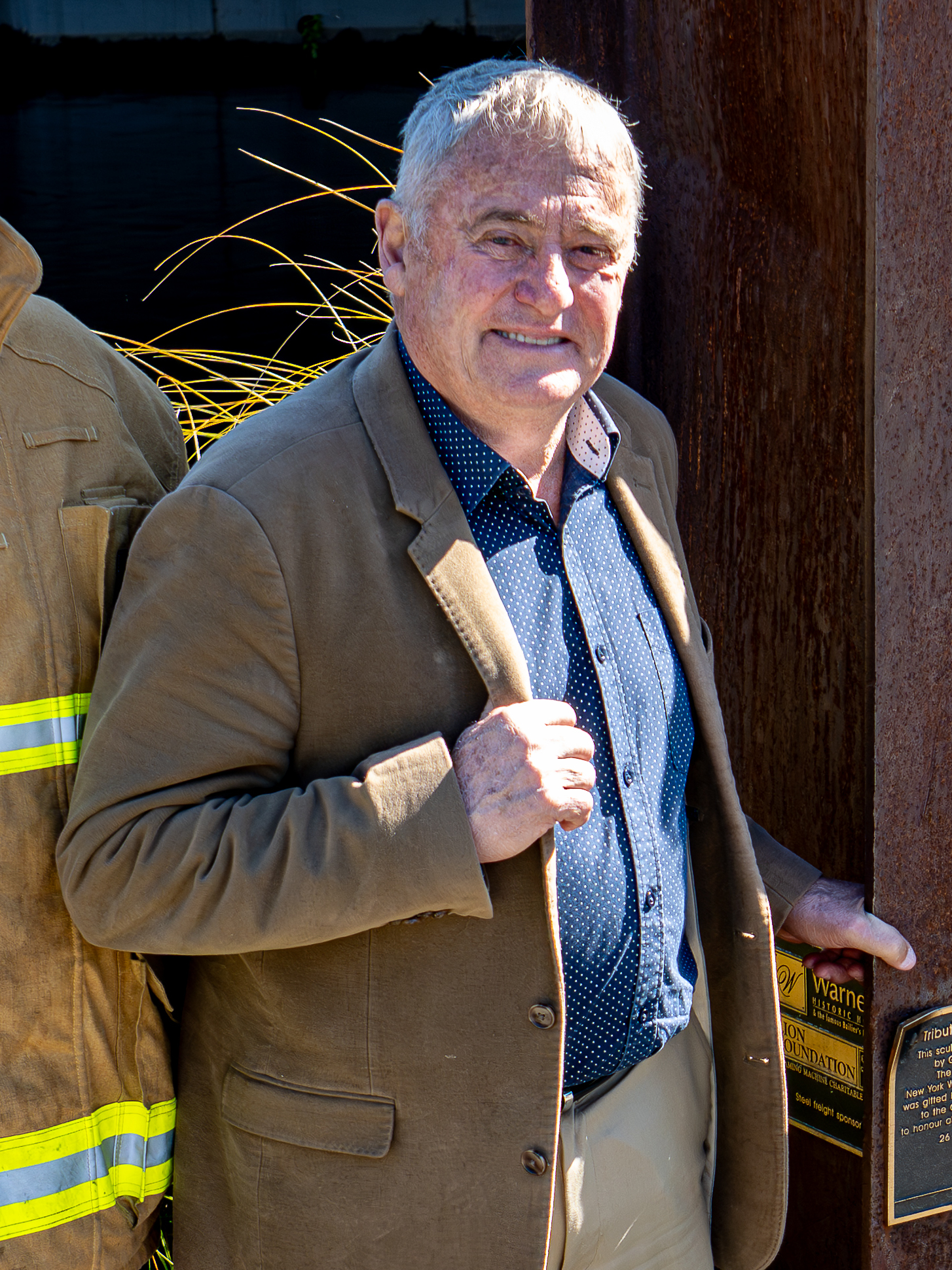
- Mauger in 2025

47th Mayor of Christchurch
- Incumbent
- Assumed office 25 October 2022
- Deputy: Pauline Cotter
- Preceded by: Lianne Dalziel

Personal details
- Born: Philip Simon Mauger; 1957 or 1958 (age 68–69) Christchurch, New Zealand
- Party: Independent
- Spouse: Chrissy Mauger
- Relations: 5
- Profession: Construction manager
- Mauger's voice Mauger introducing himself, recorded September 2024

Philip Simon Mauger (born c. 1958) is a politician and former businessman who has served as the Mayor of Christchurch since 2022.

Before entering politics, Mauger owned and operated an earthmoving and construction company. In 2019 he was elected to the Christchurch City Council as councillor for the Burwood ward. At the following local-body elections in 2022 he was elected mayor of Christchurch; he was reelected in 2025 with a majority of the popular vote.

== Early life and business career ==
Mauger grew up in Burwood, later moving to Avonhead. He is the son of Warner and Patricia Mauger. Warner operated a service station and car mechanic business in Burwood.

In 1974 he started working for his grandfather's company Maugers Contracting, later becoming the owner. The business works mainly in earthworks for subdivisions, roads and drainage. The business was involved in restoring roads in the east of Christchurch after the 2010 Christchurch earthquakes.

Mauger and Christchurch Mag & Turbo Warehouse owner Hayden Knighton were badly injured in 2015 when their car was sandwiched between four vehicles (including a fuel tanker) on the Great Western Highway west of Sydney necessitating a long recovery period. He suffered 21 broken bones and was in intensive care for two weeks.

== Political life ==
Mauger is a centre-right independent politician. He has been aligned with the "frugal five"; a group of councillors that take a conservative approach to council spending, and oppose increases in rates. He has been described as having a "hands-on" approach to resolving problems, that has sometimes put him in conflict with council staff and bylaws.

=== City Councillor ===
Mauger was elected as the councillor for Burwood ward in the 2019 local government election. He defeated three-term incumbent Glenn Livingstone who had been in the seat since 2010.

In 2020, Mauger used heavy equipment from his company to dig a drainage trench on residential red zone land. This was a "vigilante" attempt to resolve flooding in the area. However, he had not sought permission from council. The repair and remediation cost the council approximately NZ$9,000. He was fined NZ$300. In March 2021 he opened a quarry without appropriate consents in Templeton.

In November 2021 he sent a text message to the then Mayor of Christchurch, Lianne Dalziel, about his son's desire to build a film studio. This was identified by Dalziel as a conflict of interest issue. He was also warned by the council to follow official channels after directly contacting staff at an organic waste company the council had a contract with.

In response to the stench from the waste plant fire Mauger offered to fill his fire-engine with bleach and spray it on the waste plant remains. This idea was rejected by both council staff and fellow councillors, as it would be difficult to administer and potentially create a greater hazard.

During his time as a councillor, Mauger attended 67 of 69 council meetings, and 125 of 136 council briefings.

=== Mayoralty ===
Mauger declared his intention to run for mayor approximately a year before the 2022 mayoral election. At the time he also gave up directorship and ownership of his contracting business to focus on politics. He received donations totalling NZ$147,000, most of which was used prior to the three months before the election. Mauger donated to four councillor candidates, and personally endorsed 13 candidates across the city council and local boards, in order to get 'like-minded individuals' in place.

Mauger won the election with a narrow majority over rival candidate David Meates. He was sworn into the role of mayor on 25 October 2022 along with his deputy Pauline Cotter.

A review of his performance against his election promises during the first six months of his role as mayor found he had not met his target of reducing rates, but he had some success in reducing the bureaucracy at council. In his mayoral campaign, Mauger promised a roving rapid response "pothole crew" to repair minor damage to footpaths where traffic management is not required. In the first six months the team performed 1939 repairs.

In October 2023, Mauger expressed his belief that the council was in a poor financial position. During the early stages of planning, an 18% rise in rates was considered possible as part of the 2024–2034 Long Term Plan. He proposed cutting services such as libraries and swimming pools to mitigate the rates rise, saying "everything is on the table". Ultimately the LTP resulted in a 9.90% average rates increase for the year 2024/2025.

Mauger supported the restoration of the Governors Bay jetty, personally contributing to the restoration costs. The restored jetty opened in September 2023.

In November 2023 Mauger penned a letter to the international group Mayors for Peace, addressing the ongoing Gaza war. He called for an immediate ceasefire in the Gaza Strip.

In January 2024, Mauger suggested in a report to council that Christchurch could host the 2030 Commonwealth Games. Christchurch previously hosted the games in 1974. The suggestion was met by protestors in the council chamber, and despite a lukewarm response from councillors they agreed to ask council staff to investigate the possibility. In September, staff from the council's economic development agency — ChristchurchNZ — recommended the council not spend any more money investigating the possibility.

In mid-June 2024, Mauger and a majority of councillors announced that Christchurch City Council would be withdrawing from Local Government New Zealand after the association raised its annual membership costs by more than NZ$20,000. He supported the withdrawal on the grounds that it would allow the Council to directly advocate for issues important to Christchurch and Banks Peninsula.

In 2024 Mauger led a council delegation in a visit to Shenzhen, China.

In early June 2025, Mauger expressed disagreement with RMA Reform Minister Chris Bishop's decision to reject 17 of the Christchurch City Council's 20 recommendations to opt out of some of the Government's national housing intensification rules, describing it as a "kick in the guts." Since 2022, the Council had sought to limit housing intensification and high-rise buildings in certain areas. By contrast, Urbanist collective Greater Ōtautahi chairperson M Grace-Stent said that Bishop's decision brought certainty following three years of delays, decision-making, submissions and hearing panels.

In early July 2025, Mauger has expressed support for Finance Minister Nicola Willis' announcement that the Government wanted to cap local and regional councils' rate rises as a means of addressing alleged "wasteful spending." Mauger has supported capping council rates at five percent but conceded this would be difficult due to inflation. During the 2022–2025 term, the Christchurch City Council's rates had increased by 25 percent over a three-year period.

Mauger ran successfully for re-election as Christchurch mayor in the 2025 local elections.

On 15 November 2025 Mauger told a reporter that the McLeans Grassland Reserve, a scenic reserve preserving a portion of the 1% of remaining prehuman Canterbury Plains vegetation, was "a bit of dirt that only grows rabbits, rocks and grass". He said it would be a perfect site for a solar farm, which could be built "without too much hassle", adding "It's going to cause a bit of a furore, I'm sure".

== Personal life ==
Mauger and his wife, Chrissy, have five children between them as well as five grandchildren. He is a motor racing enthusiast and has raced cars all over the world.

== Electoral history ==
=== 2025 Christchurch mayoral election ===
2025 Christchurch mayoral election
Party	Candidate	Votes	%	±%
Independent	Phil Mauger^{†}	60,137	55.95	+11.39
Independent	Sara Templeton	40,533	37.71	(new)
Independent	Thomas Healey	1,714	1.59	(new)
Independent	Nikora Nitro	1,525	1.42	+0.56
Independent	Blair Anderson	1,327	1.23	(new)
Independent	Phil Arps	448	0.42	(new)
Independent	Tubby Hansen	354	0.33	+0.09
Independent	P Wakeman	320	0.30	−0.50
Informal votes		105	0.10	+0.02
Blank votes		1,008	0.94	+0.16
Turnout		107,475	38.30	−6.06
Registered electors		280,587		
Independent hold				
^{†} incumbent

Political offices
Preceded by Lianne Dalziel	Mayor of Christchurch; 2022–present	Incumbent
