= The People's Choice (political ticket) =

- Leader: Paul McMahon
- Founded: 1995
- Ideology: Social democracy
- Political position: Centre-left
- Colors: Red
- Christchurch City Council: 6 / 17
- Christchurch Community Board members: 14 / 36
- Environment Canterbury: 3 / 13

Website
- http://www.peopleschoice.co.nz/

The People's Choice (previously Christchurch 2021) is a centre-left political ticket that contests elections for the Christchurch City Council, and the Canterbury Regional Council (Environment Canterbury) in Christchurch, New Zealand.

The group serves as the council's major left of centre bloc, opposing the centre-right group Independent Citizens. The group has formal connections to the Labour Party.

== History ==
The People's Choice was founded as Christchurch 2021 in 1995.

Megan Woods, later a cabinet minister and MP, was Christchurch 2021's mayoral candidate in 2007.

The ticket has an association with the New Zealand Labour Party, and although it has never run a mayoral candidate under its modern title, it tends to support centre-left mayors both on council and during election campaigns.

At the 2019 Christchurch City Council election, People's Choice candidates won seven seats in the Christchurch City Council and one board member was elected under the People's Choice ticket.

During the 2022 Christchurch City Council election, People's Choice candidates won four seats in the Christchurch City Council. During the 2022 Environment Canterbury election, two People's Choice candidates were elected to the Environment Canterbury.

Throughout its existence, The People's Choice has been associated with national left-wing parties, including the Labour Party, the Alliance, and the Green Party. As of the 2025 Christchurch City Council election, it has a strong association with the Labour Party, receiving logistical and volunteer support from local Labour branches in Christchurch, and a memorandum of understanding with the Green Party.

During the 2025 Christchurch City Council election, six People's Choice candidates were elected to the city council and 14 candidates were elected to local community boards in Christchurch. During the 2025 Environment Canterbury election, three People's Choice candidates were elected to Environment canterbury.

== Policies and platform ==
The People's Choice sits to the left of the centre-right Independent Citizens grouping on council.

In its 2016 policy manifesto, the ticket voiced support for a rental warrant of fitness and "supporting Māori economic development through partnership with Ngāi Tahu and other iwi".

== Organisation ==
Representatives for The People's Choice make a commitment to pay a portion of their salary as an elected member to the ticket's organisation. Melanie Coker, campaign manager of The People's Choice for the 2025 council elections, has said that this enables the ticket to support candidates who may not otherwise have the means to support a campaign by themselves, increasing political diversity. The People's Choice does not normally contest every seat in Christchurch, prioritising electoral contests where its candidates have the highest chance of victory. Paul McMahon, co-chair of The People's Choice as of 2025, cited Harewood ward as an area that would likely be unwinnable for the ticket due to the area's right-wing bent.

== Electoral performance ==
Election	# of candidates					Winning candidates					Ref.
Election	Mayor	Council	Board	Regional council	Total	Mayor	Council	Board	Regional council	Total	Ref.
2019	–	13	21	8	42	–	6 / 13	12 / 21	4 / 8	22 / 42 50%	
2022	–	7	16	4	27	–	5 / 7	14 / 16	2 / 4	21 / 27 77.8%	
2025	–	8	21	5	34	–	6 / 8	14 / 21	3 / 5	23 / 34 67.6%	
