= Philip Arps =

New Zealand white supremacist

- Born: 1974 or 1975
- Occupation: Insulation installer
- Known for: White supremacy
- Status: Released
- Criminal charges: Offensive behaviour (2016); Distributing objectionable material (2019); Breaches of bail/release conditions (2021 & 2022); Breaching protection order, threatening bodily harm, and perverting the course of justice (2024)
- Penalty: Multiple prison sentences

Details
- Imprisoned at: Christchurch, 2019 & 2023

Philip Neville Arps (born 1974 or 1975) is a New Zealand white supremacist and neo-Nazi. He has a long criminal record, both of politically motivated crimes and crimes of an ordinary, apolitical nature. He first came to prominence when charged with distributing objectionable material, being the video of the 2019 Christchurch mosque shootings that had been livestreamed. He was unrepentant and was jailed for the offence. He has continued to promote his views, and to threaten violence against politicians, officials and his ex-wife's new partner, which resulted in further prison sentences, in 2023 and 2024. He stood as a candidate for a school board of trustees in 2022, which led to a law change to bar people with certain criminal convictions from serving on school boards.

== Prior to the Christchurch mosque shootings ==
By March 2019 Arps had more than 30 criminal convictions for indecent assault, guns, drugs, burglary, and fraud. A 2019 news report referred to "an indecent assault on a woman in 1999". Another report described him as having been "previously made bankrupt in 2001".

His most prominent offending before 2019 occurred in 2016, when he pleaded guilty to charges of offensive behaviour after being part of a group that delivered pigs' heads and offal to Al Noor Mosque in Christchurch. The mosque was collecting food donations to send to Fiji in the aftermath of Cyclone Winston and the animal remains were left in a box marked "Fiji". As part of the offending Arps and another man filmed themselves giving Nazi salutes and Arps saying, "White power ... Bring on the cull." He was fined $800 and said that he "won" by not being prosecuted for a hate crime.

In 2018 Arps wrote a racist letter to Auckland mayor Phil Goff, who later passed it on to Police.

Arps owned a "Nazi-themed insulation company" which was registered in 2010 and openly operated in Christchurch. Beneficial Insulation used a black sun symbol (designed by Heinrich Himmler) as its logo on company vans, charged prices in multiples of $14.88, dressed staff in camouflage uniforms, and had a web address that alluded to Auschwitz concentration camp. In the wake of the terrorist attacks of March 2019 the company was reported to police, removed from review websites like Builderscrack, and delisted by the Insulation Association of New Zealand. Its website and Facebook profiles were both taken offline. In September 2023 it was removed from the Companies Office's register, having filed no annual return that year. Arps was the sole director.

== Distribution of mosque shootings video ==
On 15 March 2019 there was a mass shooting in Christchurch targeting Muslims. The terrorist carried a camera throughout, livestreaming to social media. The resulting video of the shooting was quickly classified by David Shanks of the Office of Film and Literature Classification as "objectionable" under the Films, Videos, and Publications Classification Act 1993, making it a criminal offense to possess or distribute it, and police took action against 13 people in relation to the video. Arps sent the video to 30 people, describing it as "awesome", and asked a friend to modify it by adding cross-hairs and a "kill count". When arrested he told police that he "could not give a fuck, mate" about the shooting victims.

He was found guilty of distributing objectionable material. At one of his court appearances, Arps distributed copies of the "Holocaust Handbooks" series by German holocaust denier Germar Rudolf to journalists and the public. In June 2019, Arps was sentenced to 21 months in jail, with Massey University distinguished professor Paul Spoonley describing him as "an unrepentant, hardcore white supremacist". At his sentencing Judge Stephen O'Driscoll described Arps as "remorseless". His pre-sentencing report included matters that gave the judge "real concern", including Arps comparing himself to Rudolf Hess, Deputy Führer of Nazi Germany. Arps filed the first of two unsuccessful appeals against his sentence on the day he received it.

While in prison, Arps sent letters to Newshub which praised mass murderer Anders Breivik, threatened harm to Prime Minister Jacinda Ardern, and expressed a desire to see a former Prime Minister publicly executed. Newshub did not publish the letter. The Government announced plans to change the way letters written by extremist prisoners are vetted before sending.

His sentencing and unsuccessful appeals were later referenced by the Royal Commission of Inquiry into the terrorist attack as part of its paper on hate crime. Answering a question from the public the Commission of Inquiry also reported "no evidence [the shooter] knows Philip Arps or that there was any other connection between them."

=== Complaint about being called a "white supremacist" ===
Arps was called a "white supremacist" in a television piece filmed by Newshub journalist Patrick Gower and broadcast on 30 June 2019. He submitted a complaint to the Broadcasting Standards Authority (BSA) on the grounds that this label was "inaccurate and unbalanced". The BSA found that "we do not consider the issue of whether Mr Arps is a ‘white supremacist’ to be a controversial issue" and that Gower's words were "clearly a statement of analysis and opinion". Arps's complaint was not upheld.

Media reports have regularly described Arps as a white supremacist since the ruling. Newshub's reports on a court appearance in December 2020, a 2022 New Zealand Herald column by sociologist Jarrod Gilbert, and Stuff's reporting into Arps's run for a high school board of trustees all used the term directly or indirectly. Other sources have called him a 'neo-Nazi', including a 2023 book review by a University of Auckland academic and a 2019 Newsroom article.

=== Parole breaches ===
Arps was automatically released from prison in January 2020, having served half of a sentence of less than two years. Release conditions were imposed, including wearing a GPS monitor, making no contact with members of the Muslim community, and not owning or using firearms. He unsuccessfully appealed against these conditions with a judge noting Arps's "deep-seated enmity towards people of the Muslim and Jewish faiths" as a reason to retain them. In August 2020 he was arrested and appeared in court after visiting a home brew store next door to Linwood Islamic Centre (Mosque). Charges were dropped because although the GPS evidence showed Arps within 17m of the mosque, there was no proof that he made contact with any members of its community. Corrections were made to pay $3,000 towards Arps's costs.

In December he returned to court and a new condition was added, preventing him from coming within 100m of the Linwood Islamic Centre.

New charges related to breach of his electronic monitoring conditions were filed against Arps on 8 January 2021, and he was given a March 2021 court date.

== Further offending and trials ==
He was arrested again in March 2021, accused of sending obscene messages to a probation officer – behaviour that had started in 2020. Police opposed bail, but it was granted. This case eventually saw Arps tried in 2022 and sentenced to four months in prison in April 2023. Reported quotes from the "tame end" of Arps's "barrage" of messages to his parole officers included the insults "worthless", "fat", "piss-weak" and "violently disgusting". He also wrote, "I really want to shoot you in the face." The sentence came over a year after a judge-alone trial on 18 February 2022, when Arps appeared in the Christchurch District Court having refused to wear a mask or take a rapid COVID test, and saying he was unvaccinated. A New Zealand flag was draped over his shoulder during his appearance. (He had been in court five days earlier on a separate matter relating to the Convoy 2022 New Zealand protest – see "Public execution" arrest, 2022 below.)

In August 2022, in between his trial and conviction for breaching release conditions, Arps protested in support of Counterspin Media founders Kelvyn Alp and Hannah Spierer as they appeared in Christchurch District Court. Like Arps had been, they were charged with distributing an objectionable publication – specifically, the livestream video of the Christchurch shootings. Arps shouted insults at counterprotestors and at people entering the court.

== Anti-government protests ==
=== "Public execution" arrest, 2022 ===
Arps was arrested in Picton on 11 February 2022 while travelling north to join the Convoy 2022 New Zealand protest in Wellington. According to media reports he had told people at a Christchurch petrol station that he was on his way to a "public execution", and that "I've been promising it, I'll see you in seven to 10 years". He also reportedly threatened to kill members of the public and police. He was charged with threatening to kill and using offensive language. Three days later, on Monday 14, he was granted bail with conditions including a ban on entering the greater Wellington area. As the protest continued Arps was an active participant on Telegram, calling for contractors who helped police install concrete blocks to be named and added to the "Nuremberg list".

=== Te Aratai College opening ===
In June 2022 Christchurch's Te Aratai College, formerly Linwood College, was officially opened by Prime Minister Jacinda Ardern. At least one of Arps' sons was a student there at the time. A "freedom movement" protest of 50–100 people gathered near the school during the Prime Minister's visit, having been encouraged by Arps and others. His social media posts, made under the username "Antisemite", claimed that his son had attracted the attention of security by asking whether Ardern would be protected by bulletproof glass. The protesters' grievances included vaccines, Marxism, the media, police, and Three Waters. Ardern was kept away from the protest.

== Candidacy for school board of trustees ==
Four months later, in September 2022, Arps finished last in the election for parent representatives on Te Aratai College's Board of Trustees. He received 25 votes (the school roll was 870). His candidacy had been controversial, with Federation of Islamic Associations of New Zealand chair Abdur Razzaq describing Arps' nomination as part of a trend where white supremacists take part in elections to "create disharmony" and "normalise hate". Students, including the head student, and a Christchurch city councillor with children at the school publicly lobbied against Arps.

Routine police vetting, which would have excluded Arps from most positions within a school, did not apply to board members at the time. Associate Education Minister Jan Tinetti sought urgent advice on an incoming code of conduct, people's eligibility for board positions, and her legal ability to intervene if Arps was elected. In June 2023 the Minister issued the first Code of Conduct for State School Board Members which she said would "safeguard our boards". It included an objective to be "culturally responsive and fair". Tinetti was also responsible for a 2023 amendment to the Education and Training Act which bars people with certain criminal convictions from serving on school boards (unless exempted by the Secretary of Education).

== Threatening behaviour (2023–2024) ==
=== Ex-wife's partner ===
On 3 April 2023, Arps broke a protection order by parking his car behind his ex-wife's car while she was picking up one of their children from school and making repeated throat-slitting gestures towards her new partner. This resulted in charges of contravening a protection order and threatening to do grievous bodily harm (he pled not guilty on 26 September 2023). Around two weeks later Arps received a four-month prison sentence for sending obscene messages to a probation officer. While in prison Arps attempted to get "aggressive and derogatory" messages passed on to his ex-wife's partner. These included attempts to get him to drop the charges that Arps was facing. Consequently, Arps was also charged with perverting the course of justice, for which he chose a jury trial.

On 19 January 2024 Arps was found guilty of all three charges and given a 20-month sentence, most of which had already been served. The judge heard that Arps' relationship with Corrections had broken down, and that he would not comply with conditions that were set for him, or wear an electronic tracking bracelet. Release conditions, not including tracking, were set for a further six months.

=== Green Party candidate Francisco Hernandez ===
Francisco Hernandez was the Green Party candidate for Dunedin North in the 2023 general election. Arps responded to his selection on Twitter, calling Hernandez (who was born in the Philippines) a "paper citizen" whose involvement in politics "amounts to international political high treason". Hernandez, who went on to become a Member of Parliament the next year, called himself "a proud citizen of Aotearoa New Zealand" and Arps "the CEO of racism".

=== Byron Clark ===
Byron Clark is a researcher whose work focuses on far-right and conspiracy communities. He is the author of Fear: New Zealand’s hostile underworld of extremists, a 2023 book that covered figures including Philip Arps.

In January 2024 Clark requested a restraining order against Arps, who was in prison at the time. In July the Christchurch District Court found that Clark's evidence had not directly stated that he feared for his own safety, and so dismissed his request. Clark, who had filed his request without a lawyer, thought that his fear ought to have been evident as his affidavit documented years of harassment and intimidation that he had endured from Arps. One example was a September 2023 post on Telegram in which Arps encouraged another man who had harassed him at work.

During the court hearing Arps posted insults about Clark on social media. He had planned to speak in court, but left before the hearing ended while loudly insulting Clark.

== Mayoral candidacy ==
Arps ran for the mayoralty of Christchurch in the city's 2025 election, as a self-declared "Independant [sic] Nationalist New Zealand" candidate. With 448 votes out of 107,553 cast, he placed sixth of the eight candidates.

== Personal life ==
Arps lived in Christchurch for many years, with his lawyer saying in 2024 that he now lives in the West Coast. He is a divorced father of six boys. His ex-wife has a protection order against him, which he has breached.
