= 1992 Auckland City Council election =

Local election in New Zealand

- 10 October 1992

All 24 seats on the Auckland City Council

	First party	Second party	Third party
Party	Citizens & Ratepayers	Alliance	Labour
Last election	17	N/A	3
Seats won	17	5	1
Seat change	0	▲5	▼2

The 1992 Auckland City Council election was part of the 1992 New Zealand local elections, to elect members to sub-national councils and boards. The polling was conducted using the first-past-the-post electoral method.

== Council ==
The Auckland City Council consisted of a mayor and twenty-four councillors elected from ten wards (Avondale, Eastern Bays, Hauraki Gulf Islands, Hobson, Maungakiekie, Mount Albert, Mount Eden, Mount Roskill, Tamaki and Western Bays).

=== Mayor ===
1992 Auckland mayoral election
Party	Candidate	Votes	%	±%
Independent	Les Mills	53,407	61.54	+34.95
Alliance	Sue Corbett	21,711	25.01	
Independent	Tim Shadbolt	5,379	6.19	+1.65
Independent	Stephen Kirkwood	2,625	3.02	
Independent	Laurence Watkins	2,268	2.61	+1.92
McGillicuddy Serious	Katerina Jane Julian	1,049	1.20	
Communist League	Brigid Rotherham	343	0.39	
Majority		31,696	36.52	+25.85
Turnout		86,782		

==== Avondale Ward ====
The Avondale Ward elects two members to the Auckland City Council

Avondale Ward
Party	Candidate	Votes	%	±%
Independent	Suzanne Sinclair	3,079	37.26	−3.08
Citizens & Ratepayers	Brian Maude	3,068	37.12	−5.88
Alliance	Jim Gilbert	2,915	35.27	
Alliance	Veronica Egan	2,844	34.41	
Citizens & Ratepayers	Dawn Persson	2,581	31.23	
Independent	Max Constable	1,462	17.69	
Independent	Brian Constable	577	6.98	
Majority		153	1.85	
Turnout		8,263		

==== Eastern Bays Ward ====
The Eastern Bays Ward elects three members to the Auckland City Council

Eastern Bays Ward
Party	Candidate	Votes	%	±%
Citizens & Ratepayers	Juliet Yates	8,914	74.59	+12.13
Citizens & Ratepayers	Gray Bartlett	8,483	70.98	+27.52
Citizens & Ratepayers	Ross Johns	7,161	59.92	+30.50
Alliance	Alison Clark	3,611	30.21	
Alliance	Richard Green	3,370	28.20	
Alliance	Alice Rivers	2,860	23.93	
Independent	Joe Hawke	905	7.57	+1.94
Independent	Grant Pakihana Hawke	546	4.56	
Majority		3,550	29.70	
Turnout		11,950		

==== Hauraki Gulf Islands Ward ====
The Hauraki Gulf Islands Ward elects one member to the Auckland City Council

Hauraki Gulf Islands Ward
Party	Candidate	Votes	%	±%
Alliance	Sandra Lee	2,135	73.87	+2.94
Independent	John Cranstoun	755	26.12	+24.50
Majority		1,380	47.75	
Turnout		2,890		

==== Hobson Ward ====
The Hobson Ward elects two members to the Auckland City Council

Hobson Ward
Party	Candidate	Votes	%	±%
Citizens & Ratepayers	Barbara Goodman	6,128	78.02	−9.61
Citizens & Ratepayers	John Strevens	5,080	64.68	−3.07
Alliance	Jan Riddick	2,497	31.79	
Alliance	Wayne John Hope	2,003	25.50	
Majority		2,583	32.88	
Turnout		7,854		

==== Maungakiekie Ward ====
The Maungakiekie Ward elects three members to the Auckland City Council

Maungakiekie Ward
Party	Candidate	Votes	%	±%
Citizens & Ratepayers	Ken Graham	5,747	68.66	+30.96
Citizens & Ratepayers	John Williams	5,054	60.38	+20.24
Citizens & Ratepayers	Mahe Tupouniua	4,065	48.56	
Alliance	Sue Pockett	3,867	46.20	
Alliance	Keith Park	3,476	41.52	
Alliance	Matt Robson	2,901	34.65	
Majority		198	2.36	
Turnout		8,370		

==== Mount Albert Ward ====
The Mount Albert Ward elects two members to the Auckland City Council

Mount Albert Ward
Party	Candidate	Votes	%	±%
Citizens & Ratepayers	Frank Ryan	4,057	52.94	−8.60
Alliance	Jennie Walker	3,347	43.67	
Alliance	Phil Amos	3,317	43.28	
Citizens & Ratepayers	Alan Wood	2,907	37.93	−8.36
Independent	Helen McIvor	1,697	22.14	
Majority		30	0.39	
Turnout		7,663		

==== Mount Eden Ward ====
The Mount Eden Ward elects two members to the Auckland City Council

Mount Eden Ward
Party	Candidate	Votes	%	±%
Citizens & Ratepayers	Astrid Malcolm	3,745	59.73	+11.88
Citizens & Ratepayers	Gordon Johns	3,355	53.51	+9.25
Alliance	Peter Richard Davies	2,862	45.65	
Alliance	Tom Newham	2,576	41.09	
Majority		493	7.86	
Turnout		6,269		

==== Mount Roskill Ward ====
The Mount Roskill Ward elects two members to the Auckland City Council

Mount Roskill Ward
Party	Candidate	Votes	%	±%
Citizens & Ratepayers	David Hay	6,898	66.75	−5.73
Citizens & Ratepayers	Doug Astley	5,491	53.14	+2.51
Citizens & Ratepayers	Grahame Breed	4,972	48.11	+2.48
Alliance	Marilyn York	4,478	43.33	
Alliance	Barry Gribben	3,862	37.37	
Alliance	Douglas James McGee	3,588	34.72	
Independent	Douglas B. Brebner	1,710	16.54	
Majority		494	4.78	
Turnout		10,333		

==== Tamaki Ward ====
The Tamaki Ward elects three members to the Auckland City Council

Tamaki Ward
Party	Candidate	Votes	%	±%
Citizens & Ratepayers	Bill Christian	3,759	44.01	−1.11
Alliance	Trevor Barnard	3,296	38.59	
Labour	Ian Shaw	3,270	38.29	
Alliance	Bryan Bennett	3,167	37.08	
Labour	Sherryl McKelvie	3,026	35.43	
Labour	Albie Brown	2,909	34.06	−3.34
Alliance	Fialau'a Amituanai-Toailofa	2,272	26.60	
Citizens & Ratepayers	Karen Remetis	2,076	24.30	
Citizens & Ratepayers	Owen Higgins	1,845	21.60	
Majority		103	1.20	
Turnout		8,540		

==== Western Bays Ward ====
The Western Bays Ward elects three members to the Auckland City Council

Western Bays Ward
Party	Candidate	Votes	%	±%
Alliance	Bruce Hucker	6,675	71.43	+36.65
Alliance	Sue Corbett	6,085	65.12	+30.84
Citizens & Ratepayers	Penny Whiting	4,495	48.10	
Alliance	Poumau Papali'i	4,490	48.05	
Citizens & Ratepayers	Gordon Barnaby	3,797	40.63	
Citizens & Ratepayers	Merril Lee Thompson	2,489	26.63	
Majority		5	0.05	
Turnout		9,344		
