= Electoral history of Phil Goff =

List of elections featuring Phil Goff as a candidate

This is a summary of the electoral history of Phil Goff, Mayor of Auckland (2016–present), Leader of the Labour Party (2008–2011). He was a Member of Parliament for three electorates during his career: Roskill, New Lynn and Mount Roskill.

== Parliamentary elections ==
=== 1981 election ===
1981 general election: Roskill
Party	Candidate	Votes	%	±%
Labour	Phil Goff	9,778	47.60	
National	Cheryl Parsons	7,253	35.31	
Social Credit	Chris Lynch	3,508	17.07	
Majority		2,525	12.29	
Turnout		20,539	87.34	+18.23
Registered electors		23,515		

=== 1984 election ===
1984 general election: Roskill
Party	Candidate	Votes	%	±%
Labour	Phil Goff	11,043	53.80	+6.20
National	Chris Knowles	6,835	33.30	
NZ Party	Ben Matthews	2,217	10.80	
Social Credit	Edward James Lye	789	3.84	
Independent	Anthony Peter Devicich	57	0.27	
Values	Johan Ofman	34	0.16	
Majority		4,208	20.50	+8.21
Turnout		20,525	88.41	+1.07
Registered electors		23,214		

=== 1987 election ===
1987 general election: Roskill
Party	Candidate	Votes	%	±%
Labour	Phil Goff	10,487	54.27	+0.47
National	Bob Foulkes	8,050	41.66	
Democrats	Douglas McGee	598	3.09	
NZ Party	Brian Murray	97	0.50	
Independent	Anthony Peter Devicich	91	0.47	+0.20
Majority		2,437	12.61	−7.89
Turnout		19,323	85.37	−3.04
Registered electors		22,633		

=== 1990 election ===
1990 general election: Roskill
Party	Candidate	Votes	%	±%
National	Gilbert Myles	9,132	44.72	
Labour	Phil Goff	8,488	41.57	−12.23
Green	Ian Graham Douglas	1,287	6.30	
NewLabour	Ella Henry	952	4.66	
Democrats	Douglas McGee	185	0.90	−2.19
Social Credit	John Ferdinand	153	0.74	
Independent	Walter Christie	111	0.54	
McGillicuddy Serious	Richard Alexander Foster	96	0.47	
Communist League	Anthony David Drumm	12	0.05	
Majority		644	3.15	
Turnout		20,416	85.32	−0.05
Registered electors		23,926		

=== 1993 election ===
1993 general election: Roskill
Party	Candidate	Votes	%	±%
Labour	Phil Goff	7,664	39.60	−1.97
National	Allan Spence	5,459	28.21	
NZ First	Gilbert Myles	3,530	18.24	−26.48
Alliance	Jenny-Kaye Potaka	2,260	11.67	
Christian Heritage	Rowan Dunbar	355	1.83	
McGillicuddy Serious	Julian Price	82	0.42	
Majority		2,205	11.39	
Turnout		19,350	84.90	+0.42
Registered electors		22,789		

=== 1996 election ===
1996 general election: New Lynn
Party	Candidate	Votes	%	±%
Labour	Phil Goff	15,392	50.29	
National	Richard Gardner	8,254	26.97	
Alliance	Cliff Robinson	3,554	11.61	−18.34
NZ First	Dawn Mullins	2,616	8.55	+0.34
Progressive Green	Mark Darin	301	0.98	
McGillicuddy Serious	Richard Foster	203	0.66	
United NZ	John Hubscher	128	0.42	
Advance NZ	James Prescott	91	0.30	
Natural Law	Les McGrath	68	0.12	
Informal votes		317	1.03	
Majority		7,138	23.32	
Turnout		30,607		

=== 1999 election ===
1999 general election: Mount Roskill
Party	Candidate	Votes	%	±%
Labour	Phil Goff	18,475	58.27	
National	Phil Raffills	8,768	8,768	
Alliance	Sarah Martin	1,190	3.75	
ACT	Max Whitehead	894	2.82	
Green	Chris Hay	890	2.81	
Christian Heritage	Barrie Paterson	677	2.14	
NZ First	Chris Comeskey	585	1.85	
United NZ	Yousuf Qureshi	155	0.49	
Natural Law	Linda Ellen Davy	71	0.22	
Informal votes		790	2.49	
Majority		9,707	30.62	
Turnout		31,705		

=== 2002 election ===
2002 general election: Mount Roskill
Party	Candidate	Votes	%	±%
Labour	Phil Goff	18,702	64.40	+6.13
National	Brent Trewheela	4,987	17.17	
ACT	Kenneth Wang	1,494	5.14	
NZ First	Dawn Mullins	1,301	4.48	
United Future	Bernie Ogilvy	1,253	4.31	
Christian Heritage	Ewen McQueen	582	2.00	
Alliance	Brendon Lane	337	1.16	
Progressive	Trevor Barnard	229	0.79	
Independent	Stephen Berry	157	0.54	
Informal votes		354	1.21	−1.28
Majority		13,715	47.23	+16.61
Turnout		29,042		

=== 2005 election ===
2005 general election: Mount Roskill
Party	Candidate	Votes	%	±%
Labour	Phil Goff	19,476	59.94	−4.46
National	Jackie Blue	9,581	29.49	
ACT	Kenneth Wang	1,882	5.79	+0.65
United Future	Richard Barter	860	2.65	
Destiny	Brian Ane	338	1.04	
Progressive	Suki Amirapu	257	0.79	
Direct Democracy	Barry Scott	98	0.30	
Informal votes		439	1.35	+0.14
Majority		9,895	30.45	
Turnout		32,492		

=== 2008 election ===
2008 general election: Mount Roskill
Party	Candidate	Votes	%	±%
Labour	Phil Goff	18,615	55.80	−4.14
National	Jackie Blue	12,197	36.56	+7.07
Green	Lisa Er	1,086	3.26	
ACT	Shawn Tan	718	2.15	
Kiwi	Joseph Rebello	310	0.93	
United Future	Neville Wilson	211	0.63	
Progressive	Suki Amirapu	155	0.46	−0.33
RAM	Daphne Lawless	67	0.20	
Informal votes		362	1.08	−0.27
Majority		6,418	19.23	
Turnout		33,359		

=== 2011 election ===
2011 general election: Mount Roskill
Party	Candidate	Votes	%	±%
Labour	Phil Goff	17,906	57.15	+1.35
National	Jackie Blue	10,635	33.94	−2.62
Green	Julie Anne Genter	1,258	4.01	+0.76
Conservative	Feleti Key	550	1.76	
NZ First	Mahesh Bindra	468	1.49	
ACT	Pratima Nand	240	0.77	
Legalise Cannabis	Jasmin Hewlett	167	0.53	
United Future	Bryan Mockridge	77	0.25	
Communist League	Patrick Brown	32	0.10	
Informal votes		766	2.44	+1.36
Majority		7,271	23.21	+3.97
Turnout		31,333		

=== 2014 election ===
2014 general election: Mount Roskill
Party	Candidate	Votes	%	±%
Labour	Phil Goff	18,637	55.81	−1.34
National	Parmjeet Parmar	10,546	31.58	
Green	Barry Coates	1,682	5.04	
Conservative	Paul Davie	1,094	3.28	
NZ First	Mahesh Bindra	717	2.15	+0.66
Mana	John Minto	300	0.90	
Informal votes		416	1.24	−1.20
Majority		8,091	24.23	+1.02
Turnout		33,392		

== Local elections ==
=== 2016 Auckland mayoral election ===
2016 Auckland mayoral election
Party	Candidate	Votes	%	±%
Independent	Phil Goff	187,622	47.29	
Independent	Victoria Crone	111,731	28.16	
Independent	Chlöe Swarbrick	29,098	7.33	
Independent	John Palino	22,387	5.64	−26.03
Independent	Mark Thomas	9,573	2.41	
Independent	Penny Bright	7,022	1.77	−1.64
Independent	David Hay	2,845	0.72	
Greater Auckland	Tyrone Raumati	2,387	0.60	
Christians Against Abortion	Phil O'Connor	2,095	0.53	−0.35
STOP	Tricia Cheel	2,024	0.51	+0.14
Communist League	Patrick Brown	1,826	0.46	+0.21
Independent	Mario Alupis	1,800	0.45	
Legalise Cannabis	Adam John Holland	1,772	0.45	
Independent	Susanna Kruger	1,670	0.42	−0.21
Independent	Wayne Young	1,629	0.41	−0.62
Independent	Aileen Austin	1,577	0.40	
Independent	Binh Thanh Nguyen	979	0.25	
Independent	Stan Martin	836	0.21	
Independent	Alezix Heneti	599	0.15	
Majority		75,891	19.13	
Informal votes		1,427	0.37	−0.09
Turnout		390,899	37.89	+3.17
Registered electors		1,031,667		

=== 2019 Auckland mayoral election ===
2019 Auckland mayoral election
Party	Candidate	Votes	%	±%
Independent	Phil Goff	180,146	48.97	+1.68
Independent	John Tamihere	80,903	21.99	
Independent	Craig Lord	29,577	8.04	
Independent	John Hong	16,211	4.40	
Independent	Ted Johnston	15,637	4.25	
Independent	Peter Vaughan	6,214	1.68	
Independent	Michael Coote	5,611	1.52	
STOP Trashing Our Planet	Tricia Cheel	4,116	1.11	+0.60
Christians Against Abortion	Phil O'Connor	3,984	1.08	+0.55
Independent	Genevieve Forde	2,923	0.79	
Justice For Families	Susanna Kruger	2,894	0.78	+0.36
Independent	Tom Sainsbury	2,853	0.77	
Old Skool	Glen Snelgar	2,608	0.70	
The Hemp Foundation	Tadhg Stopford	2,445	0.66	
Independent	Jannaha Henry	2,417	0.65	
LiftNZ	David Feist	2,301	0.62	
Independent	Brendan Maddern	1,446	0.39	
Virtual Homeless Community	Wayne Young	1,412	0.38	−0.03
Communist League	Annalucia Vermunt	1,055	0.28	
Independent	Thanh Binh Nguyen	954	0.25	±0.00
Independent	Alezix Heneti	514	0.13	−0.02
Informal votes		1,575	0.42	+0.05
Majority		99,243	26.98	+7.85
Turnout		367,796		
Registered electors				
