= 1992 Christchurch mayoral election =

New Zealand mayoral election

- 10 October 1992
- Turnout: 105,125
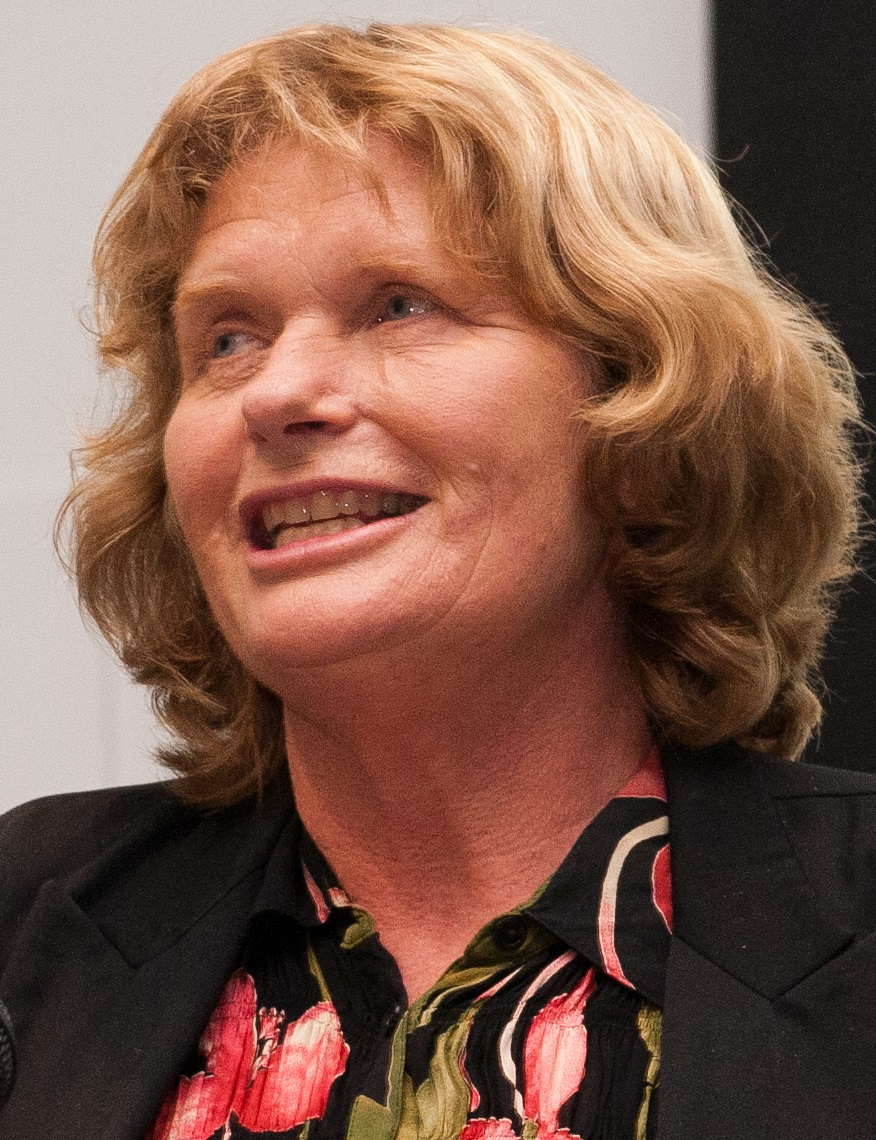

Candidate	Vicki Buck	Ken Ellis
Party	Independent	Independent
Popular vote	88,629	5,436
Percentage	84.30	5.17
Mayor before election
Vicki Buck
Elected mayor
Vicki Buck

The 1992 Christchurch mayoral election was part of the New Zealand local elections held that same year. In 1992, election were held for the Mayor of Christchurch plus other local government positions. The polling was conducted using the standard first-past-the-post electoral method.

== Background ==
Mayor Vicki Buck was decisively re-elected for a second term after facing no serious contenders. She was opposed by mainly minor party candidates, her two closest polling opponents were Ken Ellis and James Daniels the hosts of the morning show on local radio station More FM.

== Results ==
The following table gives the election results:

1992 Christchurch mayoral election
Party	Candidate	Votes	%	±%
Independent	Vicki Buck	88,629	84.30	+32.34
Independent	Ken Ellis	5,436	5.17	
Independent	James Daniels	4,856	4.61	
McGillicuddy Serious	Tony Greer	1,136	1.08	
Economic Euthenics	Tubby Hansen	920	0.87	+0.54
Communist League	Mary Joan Shields	800	0.76	
Informal votes		3,348	3.18	+2.41
Majority		83,193	79.13	+52.45
Turnout		105,125		

== Ward results ==
Candidates were also elected from wards to the Christchurch City Council.

Party/ticket	Councillors
Citizens Action	13
Labour	8
Alliance	1
Independent	2
