= Big Muffin Serious Band =

New Zealand musical group

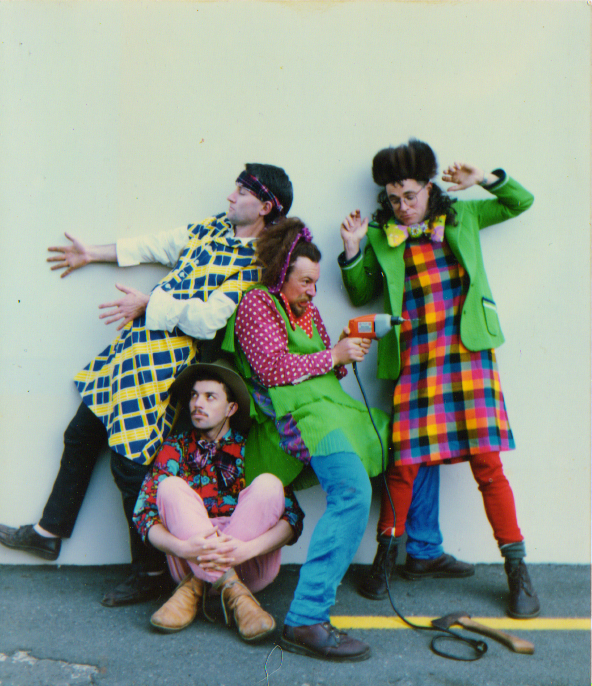
See Monkey, Caldwell, Cairns and Fulton, 1987

The Big Muffin Serious Band (BMSB) is a ukulele-based music performance group from Hamilton, New Zealand. It was started in 1983 by Jim Fulton, Graeme Cairns and Ian Coldham-Fussell when all three were members of a Project Employment Program (PEP) scheme. These schemes were initiatives instigated by the then National Government to undertake public works and provide vocational experience for the unemployed. This specific PEP scheme was run by the Hamilton City Council and involved creating performances and art in public spaces and schools.

The group has long been connected with the McGillicuddy Serious Party (McGSP), of which Cairns was the leader and a founding member, and some members of the BMSB have also stood as candidates in various elections under the McGSP banner.

The BMSB played instruments and incorporated musical styles which are found in the bush band and skiffle traditions, but the theatrical background of members contributed to a more visual and humorous street performance style than would normally be associated with these folk/blues music genres. The original line-up involved tea-chest bass, ukuleles, junk instruments and children's toys. The snare drum was added in 1986. This instrumental line-up has remained unchanged to the present. The music played was/is generally ironic or humorous, and the group employed tight vocal arrangements.

== History ==
During the mid-1980s, the BMSB was primarily a busking band. The band had won the Battle of the Buskers in May 1986 at the Gluepot Tavern, and toured New Zealand at irregular intervals during this period. At this time, Peter Caldwell replaced the late Coldham-Fussell and with the addition of a 'bottler', who was employed solely to take the hat among the audience but whose role rapidly expanded to include clown-like interpretive go-go dancing, the BMSB achieved a high degree of proficiency and were among New Zealand's top earning buskers. In 1986 and 1987, the band moved into mainstream performance venues with tours of New Zealand tertiary campuses and folk music clubs. The campus tours were organised under the auspices of the New Zealand Students' Arts Council. At this time the band consisted of Fulton, Cairns, Caldwell and the Naughty See Monkey, and it was this line-up that recorded the band's first album, Jabberwocky Goes to Town in 1987. It was recorded over the period of a week at Aerial Railway Studios, on the Coromandel Peninsula. The resulting album was one of the last vinyl albums to be made in New Zealand at the Wellington EMI record pressing factory.

In 1988, Caldwell and the Naughty See Monkey left the band, signalling the end of a performance era. Cairns and Fulton continued to perform as a duo, with Van Wering and Kendall joining in late 1988. In 1989, Fulton and Cairns, joined by Galloway and Forbes, performed in London and Bath in the UK. Upon their return to New Zealand the band reformed as a five-piece, with Howell and Matich joining as the other musicians, and Kendall continuing in the role of go-go dancer. The band once again undertook tours of New Zealand clubs and music festivals as main acts. In 1994, after the departure of Howell, the four remaining members undertook a year-long tour of New Zealand schools with their multimedia shadow puppet show, "The Eggplant that ate Otago".

Galbraith joined the band in 1997, and the line-up stabilised in 2004 when Clothier joined as the dedicated singer. During the 2000s, the band explored various theatrical, musical and artistic projects. Cairns and Fulton were responsible for the iconic Te Pahu toothbrush fence, which came to prominence when mentioned on the episode of Flight of the Concords Bret Gives Up the Dream, and the Helen Clark Celebrity Bus Shelter, named after former New Zealand Prime Minister Helen Clark who was also a Te Pahu local. Performance initiatives included performing entire shows on stilts and developing a variety of musical workshops, including edible instruments, home-made instruments, and the most recent featuring band members dressed with ukulele chords for the mass teaching of ukulele. In May 2008 Cairns and Fulton performed in Taupo with the Wellington International Ukulele Orchestra, and the following year the BMSB performed at the New Zealand Ukulele Festival with international acts such as Azo Bell and the Old Spice Boys, Uni and her Ukulele, and Sione Aleki. The BMSB have organised several experimental performances in the Waikato to accommodate these international and local acts as they tour. In 2009 Cairns, Fulton and Galbraith formed Goulash Archipelago, to play original Eastern European-style ukulele and dance music. The group and the performance concept is based around their fictitious trip to the imaginary State of Ukestan. In 2010 this group provided dance music for the Folk Dance New Zealand National Festival. Also in this year the BMSB was involved in a highly successful collaboration with robotic group The Trons and the legendary Hamilton County Bluegrass Band.

Since 2012, the band have almost exclusively performed live and on recordings using ukuleles and other stringed instruments made by Galbraith, who is a professional instrument maker in his own right who uses native New Zealand timbers in construction of his ukuleles and basses. He operates under the name of Captain Ukuleles.

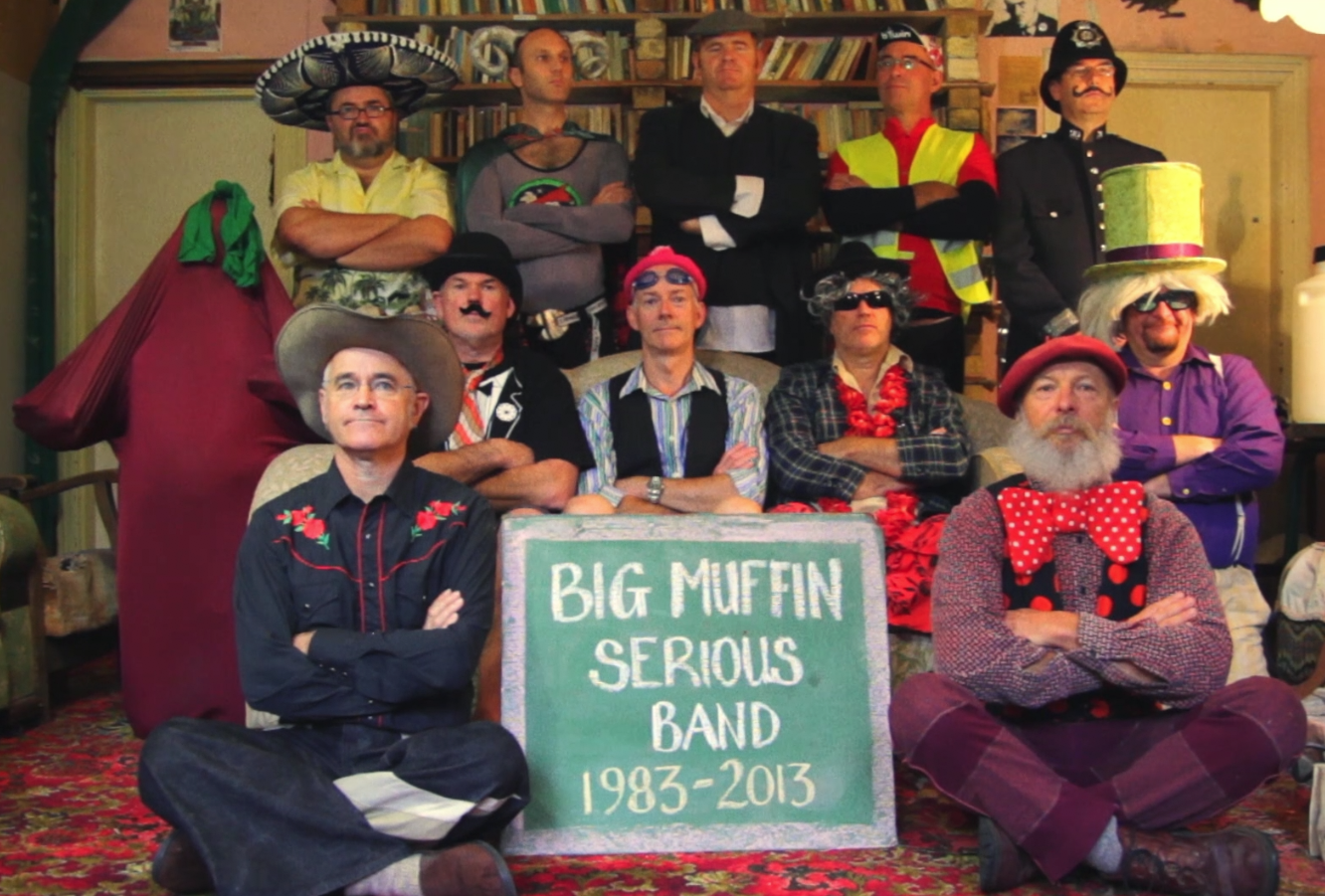
BMSB anniversary photo, 2013

Happening concurrently with the BMSB, from 1999 onwards, Fulton, Cairns and Galbraith created and ran the Serious Ukulele Ensemble, a group with fluid membership which records and performs ukulele instrumental music. Cairns and Fulton, along with two long-term members of the Serious Ukulele Ensemble, Paula Hudson and Martin Dew, performed as invited guests at the Paris Ukulele Hui in September 2010.

The BMSB featured on Bill Sevesi's Dream, a TVNZ documentary about the ukulele in New Zealand, broadcast in January 2011. Clothier left the band in early 2012, after they had a standout performance as guest performers at the Auckland Folk Festival. He was replaced by James Sutherland. This meant that coincidentally for the first time ever all four members and part-time drummer Paul Tregilgas, live in the same small rural community west of Hamilton, Te Pahu, within a 1.5 km radius. In February 2013, with Sutherland having assumed a lead vocal position, the band performed alongside Canadian ukulele virtuoso James Hill, and the Wellington International Ukulele Orchestra. In March 2013, the band featured at the Melbourne Ukulele Festival, performing shows incorporating Melbourne-based ex-Muffins Steve Matich, Naughty See Monkey, and Adam Fulton.

The year 2013 also saw the 30th anniversary of the first BMSB performance. This was marked primarily with an exhibition at the Waikato Museum, from August 2013 to January 2014, entitled 30 Years of the Big Muffin Serious Band. The exhibition of BMSB memorabilia, images and audio-visual material was opened on 31 August with a performance by many ex-members of the band accompanying present members. With the help of Arts Council funding (Creative Communities Scheme), the band also produced a music video, Mr T. Pot, celebrating 30 years of performance and featuring the majority of past band members in cameo roles. The anniversary celebrations were capped by a retrospective performance in the Hamilton Fringe Festival in October, 2013.

From 2013 to 2019, the band remained unchanged in terms of personnel, playing predominantly at music and ukulele festivals and community events. Some such events were the Palmerston North Ukulele Festival (2014), the Te Kuiti Muster (2016), the Geraldine Ukulele Festival (2014 and 2016), and headlining at the Gisborne (2018) and Opotiki Islandview (2019) Ukulele Festivals. The latter, in January 2019, heralded the final performance by James Sutherland as singer. He was replaced by Tony Wyeth, who played with the band in the early 2000s, on vocals and drums, and Nick Clothier rejoined after a lengthy hiatus. The band, minus Nick Clothier, performed at what would turn out to be the final ever Geraldine Uke Festival in 2021. In early 2023, Tony Wyeth left the band to live in France.

== Past and present BMSB musicians ==
(in chronological order of first appearance)

- Jim Fulton (present member)
- Graeme Cairns (present member)
- Ian Coldham-Fussell
- Christopher Allan
- Mark Walles
- Keith MacMillan
- Peter Caldwell
- Paul Van Wering
- Steve Matich
- Jeff Howell
- Matthew Shirley
- Bevan Galbraith (present member)
- Tony Wyeth (present member)
- Paul Tregilgas
- Adam Fulton
- Nick Clothier
- James Sutherland

== Past and present bottlers/dancers/guest musicians ==
- Naughty See Monkey
- Trudy Kendall
- Alec Forbes
- Bryce Galloway
- Adrian Holroyd
- Adrienne Carthew
- Craigie Beere
- Donald Nicholls

== Discography, BMSB ==
- Untitled Supreme Radio Studios Recording, 1985, 7" acetate record, monaural.
- Jabberwocky Goes To Town, 1987, LP vinyl record.
- Heavens to Murgatroyd, 2001, CD.
- Jabberwocky Goes To Town, 2003, CD. Re-release.
- Itsy Bitsy, December 2012, CD.

== Discography, side projects: Serious Ukulele Ensemble, The Weatherspoons, Goulash Archipelago ==
- The Instrument of Love, 2000, CD.
- Dead Serious, 2001, CD.
- Mostly Harmless, 2009, CD.
- The Music of Ukestan – Goulash Archipelago, December, 2011, CD.
- Dark Tales – The Weatherspoons, December, 2011, CD.
- Mr T Pot – Music video, funded by Creative Communities New Zealand, to celebrate 30 years of Big Muffin Serious Band performance.
