= 1995 Christchurch mayoral election =

New Zealand mayoral election

- 14 October 1995
- Turnout: 106,491
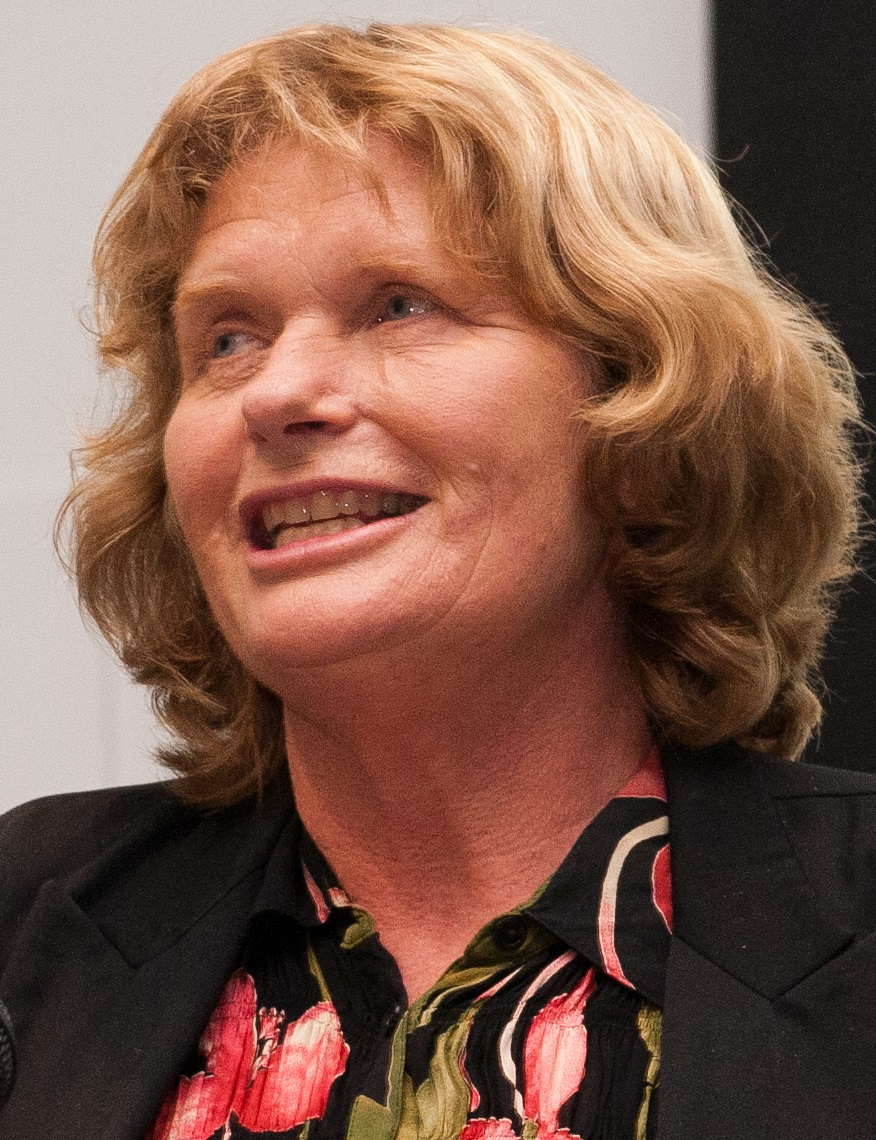

Candidate	Vicki Buck	David Ball
Party	Independent	Independent
Popular vote	96,756	4,090
Percentage	90.85	3.84
Mayor before election
Vicki Buck
Elected mayor
Vicki Buck

The 1995 Christchurch mayoral election was part of the New Zealand local elections held that same year. In 1995, election were held for the Mayor of Christchurch plus other local government positions. The polling was conducted using the standard first-past-the-post electoral method.

== Background ==
Mayor Vicki Buck was re-elected for a third term with a huge majority following the absence of a serious challenger. She was again opposed only by minor party candidates.

== Results ==
The following table gives the election results:

1995 Christchurch mayoral election
Party	Candidate	Votes	%	±%
Independent	Vicki Buck	96,756	90.85	+6.55
Independent	David Ball	4,090	3.84	
McGillicuddy Serious	Barry Bryant	1,301	1.22	
Independent	Paul Telfer	1,116	1.04	
Communist League	Ruth Gray	670	0.62	
Economic Euthenics	Tubby Hansen	513	0.48	−0.39
Informal votes		2,055	1.92	−1.26
Majority		92,666	87.01	+7.88
Turnout		106,491		

== Ward results ==
Candidates were also elected from wards to the Christchurch City Council.

Party/ticket	Councillors
Christchurch 2021	9
Citizens Action	9
Alliance	1
Independent	5
