= 1995 Auckland City mayoral election =

New Zealand mayoral election

- 14 October 1995
- Turnout: 104,806 (49.50%)

Candidate	Les Mills	Pam Corkery
Party	Independent	Independent
Popular vote	53,411	43,748
Percentage	50.96	41.74
Mayor before election
Les Mills
Elected mayor
Les Mills

The 1995 Auckland City mayoral election was part of the New Zealand local elections held that same year. In 1995, elections were held for the Mayor of Auckland plus other local government positions including twenty-four city councillors. The polling was conducted using the standard first-past-the-post electoral method.

== Mayoralty results ==
The following table gives the election results:

1995 Auckland mayoral election
Party	Candidate	Votes	%	±%
Independent	Les Mills	53,411	50.96	−10.58
Independent	Pam Corkery	43,748	41.74	
Independent	Robert Rakete	1,758	1.67	
Independent	Sue Henry	1,451	1.38	
Christians Against Abortion	Phil O'Connor	1,450	1.38	
Independent	Steven John Atwood	1,126	1.07	
Blokes Liberation Front	Chris Brady	496	0.47	
McGillicuddy Serious	Marc de Boer	479	0.45	
Independent	Victor Bryers	407	0.38	
STD Party	Laurence Watkins	277	0.26	+0.02
Communist League	James Robb	186	0.17	
Majority		9,663	9.21	−0.13
Turnout		104,806	49.50	

== Ward results ==
Candidates were also elected from wards to the Auckland City Council.

Party/ticket	Councillors
Citizens & Ratepayers	17
Labour	2
Alliance	2
Independent	3
