= 1998 Auckland City mayoral election =

New Zealand mayoral election

- 10 October 1998
- Turnout: 118,911 (51.68%)
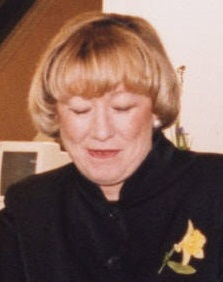

Candidate	Christine Fletcher	Les Mills
Party	Independent	Independent
Popular vote	48,181	43,151
Percentage	40.51	36.28
Mayor before election
Les Mills
Elected mayor
Christine Fletcher

The 1998 Auckland City mayoral election was part of the New Zealand local elections held that same year. In 1998, elections were held for the Mayor of Auckland plus other local government positions including nineteen city councillors. The polling was conducted using the standard first-past-the-post electoral method.

== Mayoralty results ==
The following table gives the election results:

1998 Auckland mayoral election
Party	Candidate	Votes	%	±%
Independent	Christine Fletcher	48,181	40.51	
Independent	Les Mills	43,151	36.28	−14.68
Independent	Richard Holden	12,477	10.49	
Independent	Lynda Topp	4,492	3.77	
Green	Sue Bradford	3,828	3.21	
Independent	Bill Christian	1,977	1.66	
Independent	Robert Rakete	1,401	1.17	−0.50
Christians Against Abortion	Phil O'Connor	940	0.79	−0.59
Independent	Sue Henry	781	0.65	−0.73
McGillicuddy Serious	Derek Craig	452	0.38	
Independent	Phill Matthias	448	0.37	
Independent	Tui McLeod	319	0.26	
Communist League	Felicity Coggan	298	0.25	
Independent	Peter Ralph	166	0.13	
Majority		5,030	4.23	
Turnout		118,911	51.68	+2.18

== Ward results ==
Candidates were also elected from wards to the Auckland City Council.

Party/ticket	Councillors
Citizens & Ratepayers	7
City Vision	5
Labour	2
Auckland Now	2
Independent	3
