= Christchurch City Council =

Local government authority for Christchurch, New Zealand

Coordinates: 43.53174°S 172.63173°E

Christchurch City Council Te Kaunihera o Ōtautahi
- Coat of arms

- Brand logo

Type
- Type: Territorial authority of Christchurch
- Term limits: None

History
- Established: 1 November 1989; 37 years ago
- Preceded by: Christchurch City Council
- New session started: 17 October 2025

Leadership
- Mayor: Phil Mauger, Ind. since 25 October 2022
- Deputy: Victoria Henstock, Ind. since 30 October 2025
- CEO: Mary Richardson since 3 October 2024

Structure
- Seats: 17 (including mayor)
- Political groups: Independent (8); People's Choice and Labour (7) (Note: Includes 4 People's Choice councillors, 2 joint ticket councillors and 1 Labour councillor); Independent Citizens (2)

Elections
- Voting system: First-past-the-post
- First election: 14 October 1989
- Last election: 11 October 2025
- Next election: 14 October 2028

Motto
- Fide condita, fructu beata, spe fortis

Meeting place
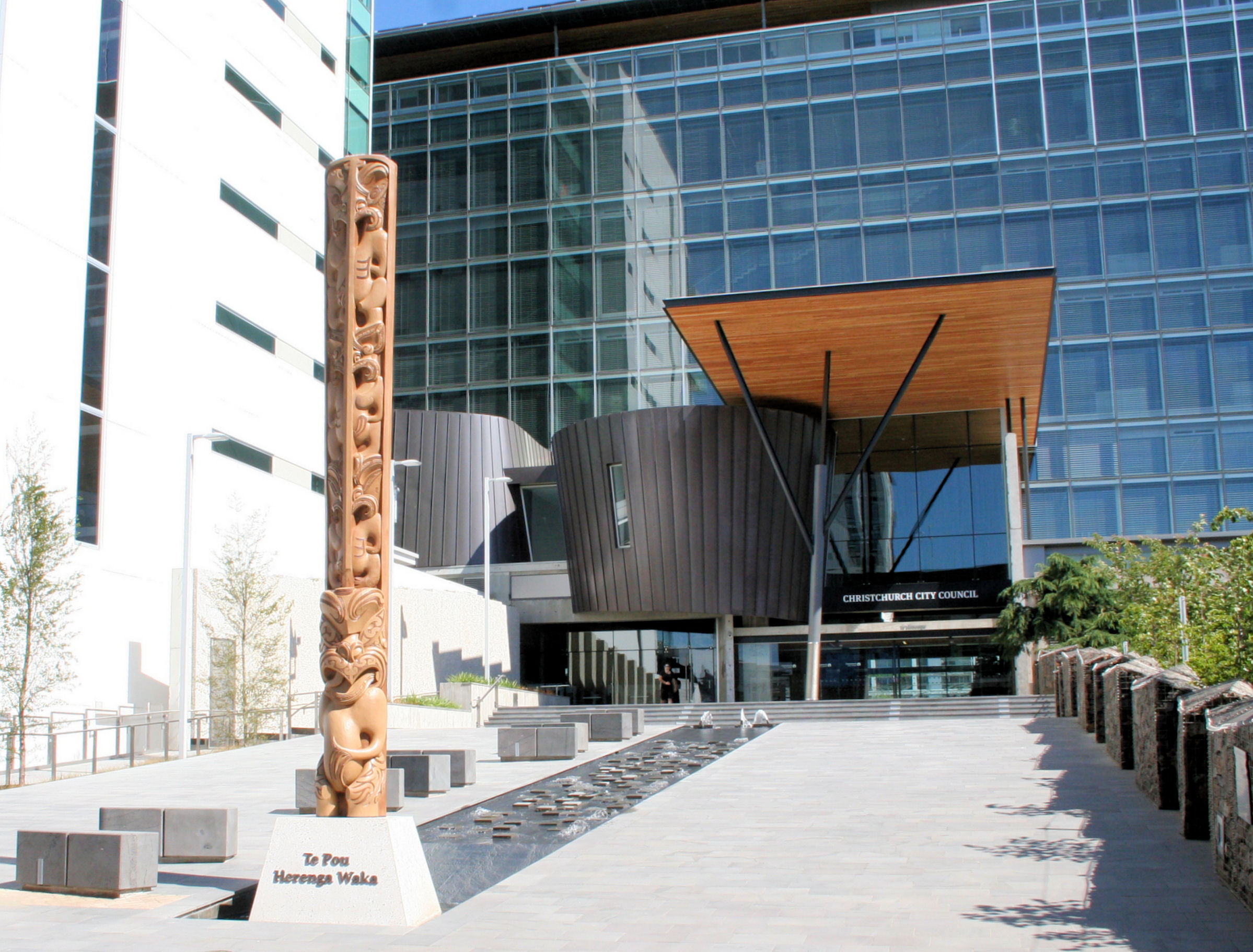
- Hereford Street Civic Offices

Website
- www.ccc.govt.nz

Christchurch City Council (abbr. CCC; Māori: Te Kaunihera o Ōtautahi) is the territorial authority for the city of Christchurch and Banks Peninsula in New Zealand. It serves as the area's local government alongside Environment Canterbury as the regional council.

A city council of the same name was first formed in 1862. Following the 1989 reforms to local government, that city council was dissolved and the current authority established. Prior to 2006, Banks Peninsula was administered separately by the Banks Peninsula District Council.

The governing body of the council has 16 councillors and is chaired by the mayor of Christchurch (currently Phil Mauger since October 2022). There are also several community boards.

== Jurisdiction ==
Location of the territory of the Christchurch City Council within New Zealand.

The authority has local government responsibility over the main urban area of Christchurch and the nearby rural town of Templeton, as well as (since 2006) Banks Peninsula and its settlements (including Akaroa and Lyttelton).

== History ==
=== Predecessor ===
The original Christchurch City Council was formed in 1862 to serve as the local municipality for Christchurch city. The jurisdiction of the original council was quite small, covering what is today just the central core of the city. By the mid-1920s the city had grown by amalgamating with some of the surrounding boroughs to include Beckenham, St Martins, Linwood, Opawa and Papanui.

=== 1989 reforms ===
As a result of the 1989 local government reforms, the original council was disestablished, and on 1 November 1989 the new Christchurch City Council took over the functions of the former Christchurch City Council as well as the Heathcote County Council, Riccarton Borough Council, Waimairi District Council, part of Paparua County Council, and the Christchurch Drainage Board. On 6 March 2006, Banks Peninsula District Council merged with Christchurch City Council.

=== Banks Peninsula amalgamation ===
Following a vote held in November 2005, the Banks Peninsula District merged into Christchurch City on 6 March 2006.

=== Earthquake response ===
Whilst public transport is the responsibility of regional councils, the Christchurch City Council provided a free central city service. The Shuttle operated from December 1998 to February 2011 and came to an end with the February 22 earthquake.

In July 2013, Christchurch City Council lost its accreditation for issuing building consents, in the middle of a rebuild period following the devastating February 2011 Christchurch earthquake. A Crown manager, Doug Martin, was installed to reform the council's building consent department. The Council successfully obtained reaccreditation in December 2014.

=== Withdrawal from LGNZ ===
In mid-June 2024, the Christchurch City Council announced it would be withdrawing from Local Government New Zealand after the local government bodies association raised its annual membership costs by more than NZ$20,000. Mayor Phil Mauger welcomed the withdrawal, saying that it would allow the Council to directly advocate for issues important to Christchurch and Banks Peninsula.

== Governing body ==
=== Mayor ===
Under most circumstances, the council is presided over by the mayor. At its first meeting after a local election, the council elects from among its members a deputy mayor, who acts as mayor in the absence and with the consent, or in the incapacity, of the mayor. The deputy mayor also presides at meetings if the mayor is not present. The deputy mayor is recommended by the mayor and is either confirmed or replaced in a vote of the first council meeting.

=== Current composition ===
The current elected members were chosen at the 2025 New Zealand local elections. Since then, two by-elections have been held to fill vacancies on community boards — one in the Innes ward and another in the Lyttelton subdivision of Banks Peninsula. In addition, one vacancy was filled by appointment under section 117(3)(a) of the Local Electoral Act 2001.

Role	Portrait	Name	Affiliation	Ward
Mayor		Phil Mauger	Let's Get Stuff Done	Elected at-large
Deputy mayor		Victoria Henstock	Your Local Independent Community Voice	Papanui
Councillor		Tyrone Fields	The People's Choice	Banks Peninsula
Councillor		Kelly Barber	Independent for Burwood	Burwood
Councillor		Tim Scandrett	Independent	Cashmere
Councillor		Jake McLellan	Labour	Central
Councillor		Celeste Donovan	Independent	Coastal
Councillor		David Cartwright	Independent Citizens	Fendalton
Councillor		Andrei Moore	Independent	Halswell
Councillor		Aaron Keown	Independent Candidate for Harewood	Harewood
Councillor		Nathaniel Herz Jardine	The People's Choice	Heathcote
Councillor		Mark Peters	Independent for Hornby	Hornby
Councillor		Yani Johanson	The People's Choice – Labour	Linwood
Councillor		Pauline Cotter	The People's Choice	Innes
Councillor		Tyla Harrison-Hunt	The People's Choice	Riccarton
Councillor		Melanie Coker	The People's Choice – Labour	Spreydon
Councillor		Sam MacDonald	Independent Citizens	Waimairi

== Chief executive ==
Chief executive of Christchurch City Council
- Incumbent; Bede Carran (acting)
- Inaugural holder: John H Gray
- Formation: 1 November 1989; 37 years ago
- Website: ccc.govt.nz

The professional head of the civil service is the chief executive, who is appointed by the council under contract for up to five years. The chief executive is assisted by a team of general managers, who each have an individualised portfolio.

In early July 2013, CEO Tony Marryatt was put on indefinite leave on full pay over the council losing its accreditation with International Accreditation New Zealand (IANZ) to issue building consents, one of council's core functions. General manager Jane Parfitt was appointed acting CEO. Karleen Edwards was chief executive from June 2014 to June 2019. In July 2019, she was succeeded by Dawn Baxendale. Baxendale resigned in November 2023, and was replaced by Mary Richardson on an interim basis.

Years	Name
1989–1993	John Gray
1993–2003	Mike Richardson
2003–2007	Lesley McTurk
2007–2013	Tony Marryatt
2013–2014	Jane Parfitt (acting)
2014–2019	Karleen Edwards
2019	Mary Richardson (acting)
2019–2023	Dawn Baxendale
2023–present	Mary Richardson (interim)

== Wards ==
The 16 councillors are each individually elected from one of 16 electoral wards.

- Banks Peninsula ward – Covers the whole of Banks Peninsula, including the subdivisions of Akaroa, Lyttelton, Wairewa, and Mount Herbert.
- Burwood ward – Covers the suburbs of Aranui, Wainoni, Bexley, Burwood, Avondale, Dallington, Shirley East, Ōtākaro Avon River Corridor, Prestons, Waitikiri, Marshlands and Travis Wetlands.
- Cashmere ward – Covers the suburbs of Westmorland, Cracroft, Somerfield, Cashmere, Beckenham, Huntsbury, and St Martins.
- Central ward – Apart from the central city, it covers the suburbs of Richmond, Linwood Village, Avon Loop, Phillipstown and Charleston.
- Coastal ward – Covers the suburbs of the suburbs of Brooklands, Spencerville, Kāinga, Ouruhia, Queenspark, Parklands, Waimairi Beach, North New Brighton, New Brighton, South New Brighton, and Southshore.
- Fendalton ward – Covers the suburbs of Fendalton, Merivale, Strowan and Bryndwr as well as parts of Ilam, Burnside and St Albans.
- Halswell ward – Covers the suburbs of Halswell, Wigram, Aidanfield and Kennedys Bush.
- Harewood ward – Covers the suburbs of Bishopdale, Harewood, Northwood and Belfast and parts of Casebrook and Yaldhurst.
- Heathcote ward – Covers the suburbs of Sydenham, Waltham, Opawa, Murray Aynsley, Heathcote Valley, Ferrymead, Saint Andrews Hill, Mt Pleasant, Moncks Spur, Redcliffs, Sumner, Scarborough and Onepoto Taylors Mistake.
- Hornby ward – Covers the suburbs of Hornby, Hei Hei, Islington and Yaldhurst, as well as parts of Wigram and Sockburn.
- Innes ward – Covers the suburbs of Edgeware, Mairehau, Shirley, and St Albans.
- Linwood ward – Covers the suburbs of Linwood, Woolston, and Bromley.
- Papanui ward – Covers the suburbs of Papanui, Redwood, Northcote and Sawyers Arms.
- Riccarton ward – Covers the suburbs of Riccarton, Ilam, Sockburn and Upper Riccarton.
- Spreydon ward – Covers the suburbs of Addington, Hillmorton, Hoon Hay and Spreydon.
- Waimairi ward – Covers the suburbs of Russley, Avonhead and Burnside as well as parts of Ilam.

== Offices ==
Christchurch civic offices
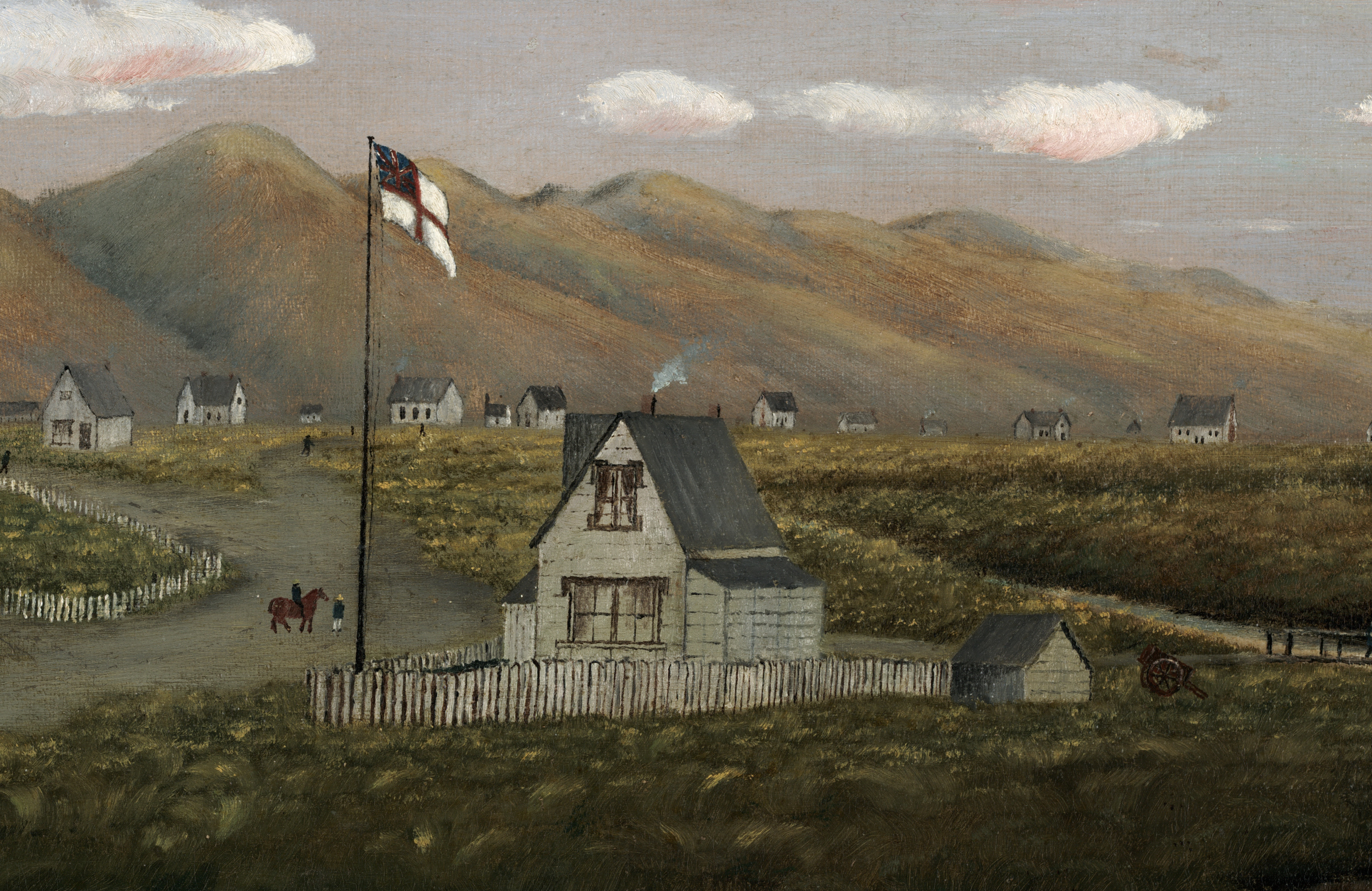
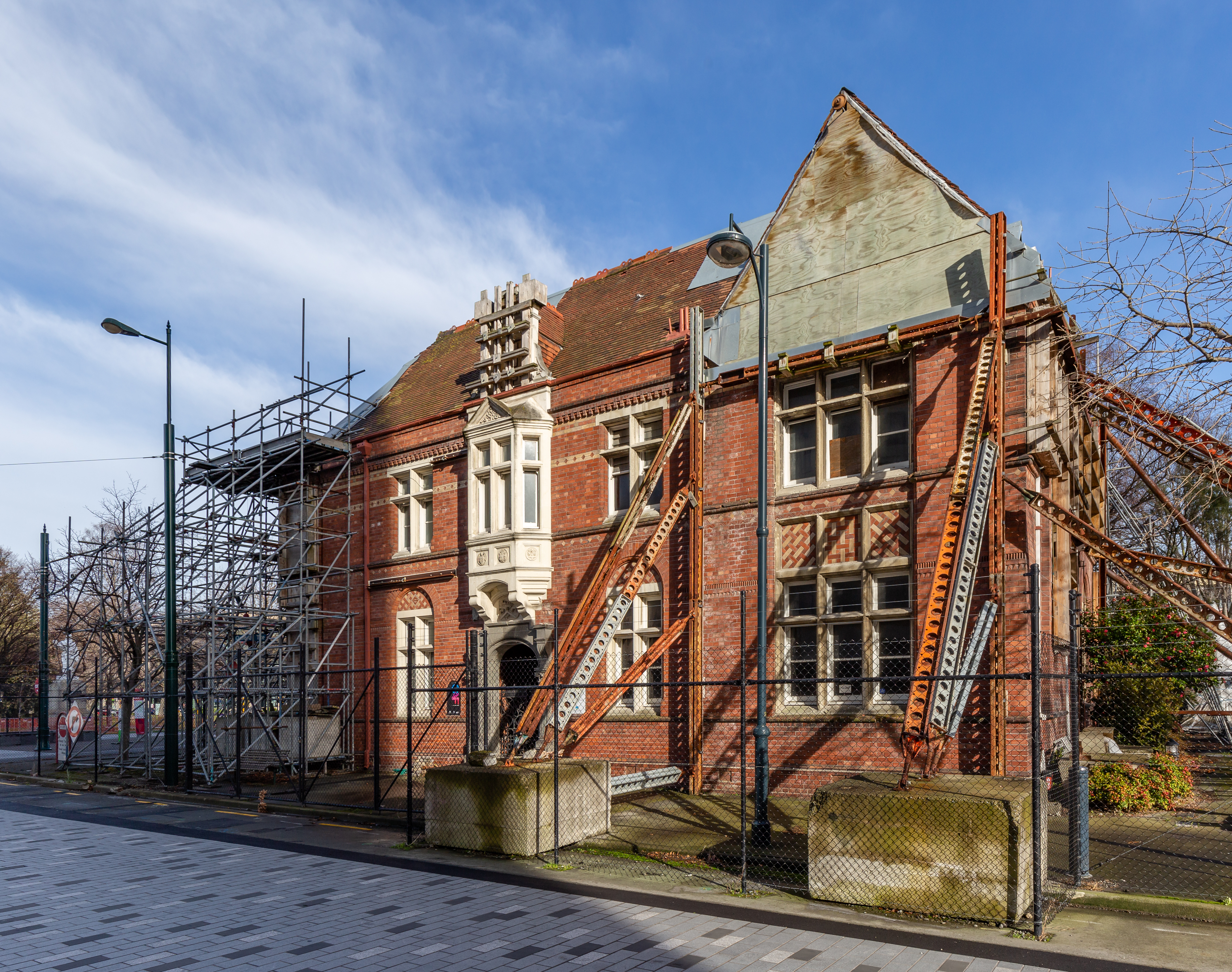
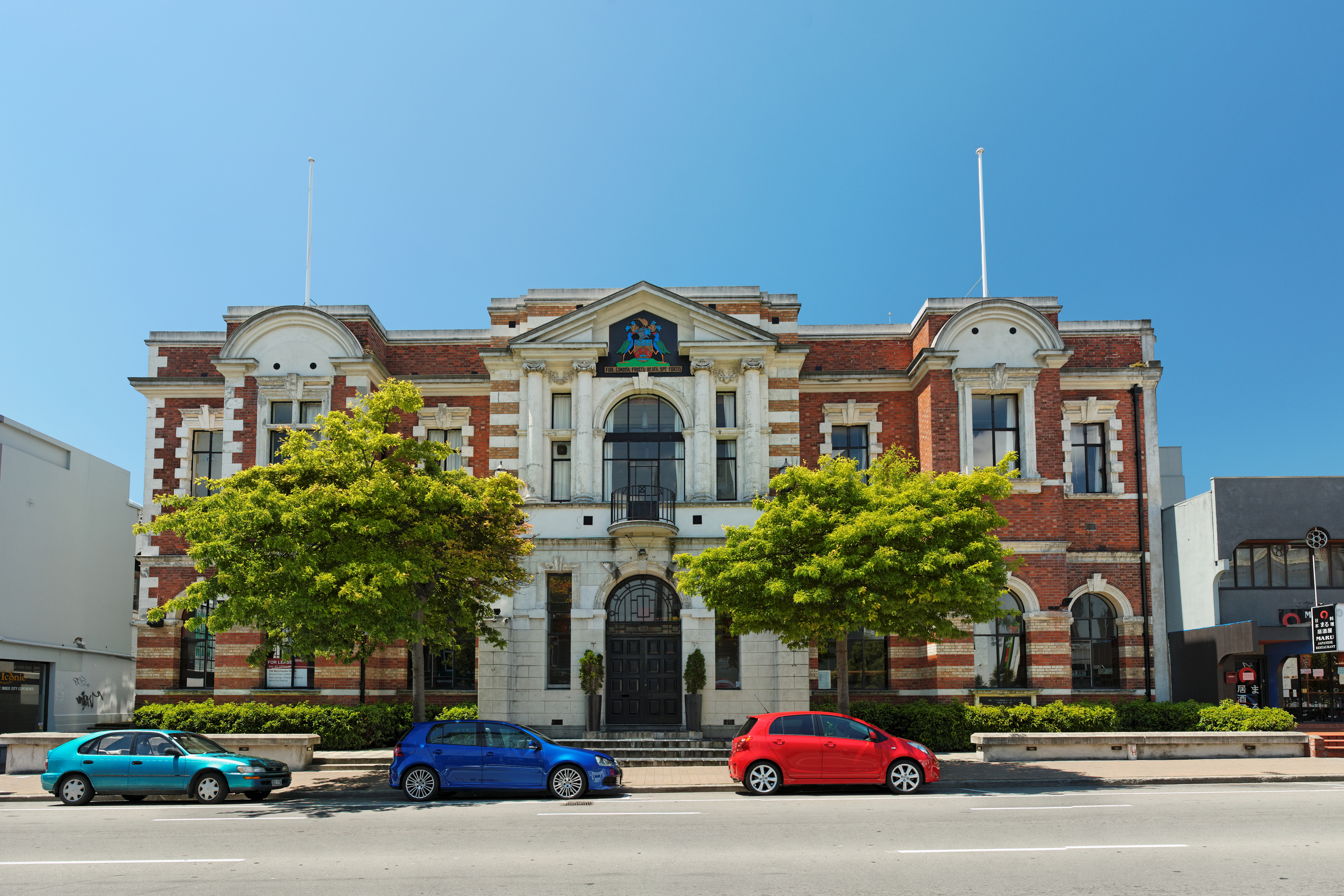
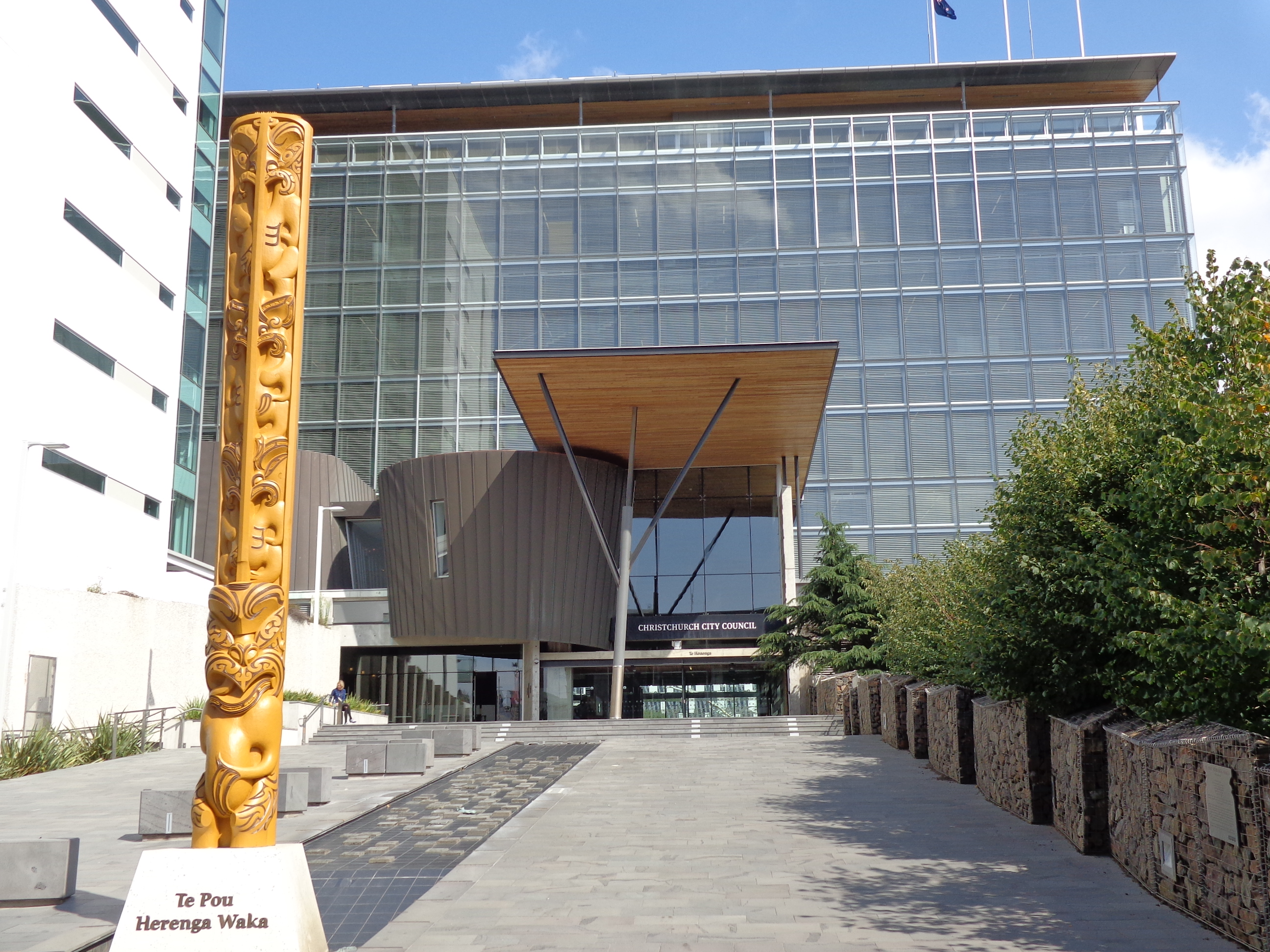
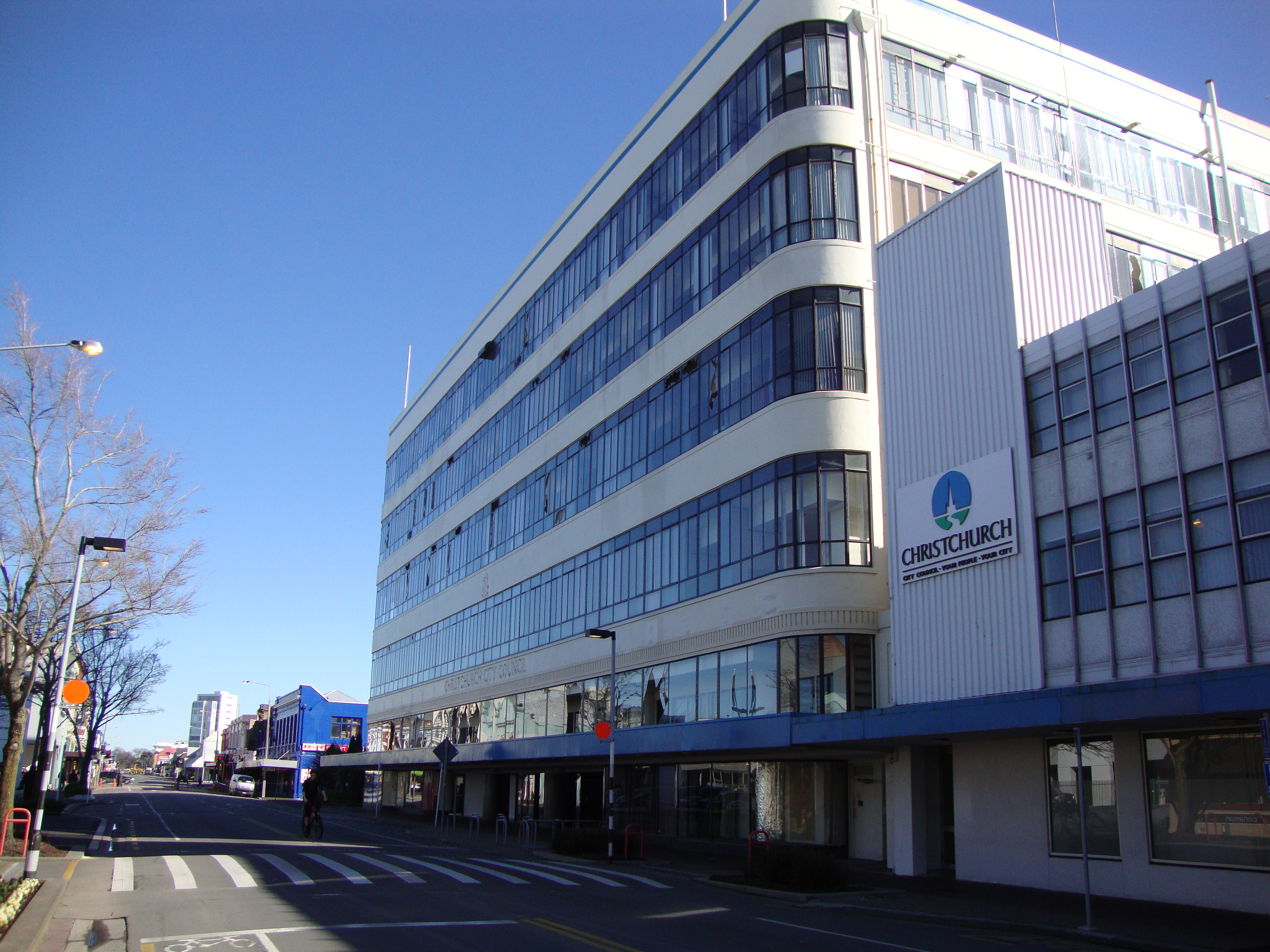
Christchurch's civic offices through the years (clockwise from top left): Christchurch Land Office (1862–1887), Our City (1887–1924), The Civic (1924–1980), civic offices in Tuam (1980–2010) and Hereford (2010–present) streets

1862–1887

The Christchurch Municipal Council, as it was originally called, was using the Christchurch Land Office, the first public building erected in Christchurch in 1851.

1887–1924

On the same site, the council had the so far only purpose-built Municipal chambers constructed, designed by Samuel Hurst Seager in a Queen Anne style. Many years after the council moved out in 1920 the building became known as Our City and is registered as a Category I heritage building with Heritage New Zealand (NZHPT).

1924–1980

Council purchased the burned out shell of the former Canterbury Hall and built new Municipal offices in Manchester Street. Later it became known as The Civic, after the name of the Restaurant and bar of the same name. The building was registered as a Category II heritage building with the NZHPT, and was demolished after the 2011 Christchurch earthquake.

1980–2010

Council bought the former Miller's Department Store and moved to 163 Tuam Street in 1980. This gave rise to the occasional metonymic use of Tuam Street to refer to the municipal government. The building was registered as a Category II heritage building with the NZHPT, and was demolished after the 2011 Christchurch earthquake.

2010 to present

In August 2010, the Council's new offices were officially opened in a refurbishment of the former Christchurch Mail Sorting Centre, designed by the Ministry of Works in 1974. The redevelopment was supervised by Wellington-based architect Ian Athfield.

The council also maintains service centres in the suburbs of Fendalton, Hornby, Linwood, Papanui, Riccarton, Shirley, and in the towns of Lyttelton, Little River and Akaroa.

== Elections ==
The council is elected every three years using the first-past-the-post voting system. The vote is conducted by postal ballot. The 2016 elections had a turnout of 38.3% down from 42.9% and 52.2% in 2013 and 2010 respectively.

Prior to the 2004 local elections, there were 24 councillors in Christchurch. At that election, the number of councillors halved to 12. For electoral purposes, Christchurch was divided into six wards from 2004, and seven wards after the amalgamation with Banks Peninsula in 2006. The six metropolitan wards each elected two councillors, with the remaining councillor elected for the sparsely populated Banks Peninsula ward. The 2016 representation review by the Local Government Commission has resulted in 16 wards, with each ward electing one councillor, i.e. an increase in three councillors.

Political groupings represented on the council are the centre-right Independent Citizens and the centre-left The People's Choice (formerly Christchurch 2021). Party politics are less influential in elections to the council than is the case for the House of Representatives, with 10 councillors elected on tickets and 7 elected as independents in 2019, including the mayor.

=== List ===
==== Council ====
- 1989
- 1992
- 1995
- 1998
- 2001
- 2004
- 2007
- 2010
- 2013
- 2016
- 2019
- 2022
- 2025

==== Mayoral ====
- 1989
- 1992
- 1995
- 1998
- 2001
- 2004
- 2007
- 2010
- 2013
- 2016
- 2019
- 2022
- 2025

== Community boards ==
The council has established six community boards. These community boards deal with matters delegated to them by the council, act as representatives and advocates for their communities, and interact with community organisations and interest groups. General tasks typically delegated to local community boards are the locations of council rubbish bins, traffic lights, stop signs and pedestrian crossings; Also rubbish collection, local disturbance review and relaying information to the main council from their Ward area through the Councillor who has a right to sit on the board within their ward. Some community boards, like the council, have created committees for specific purposes.

== See also ==
- Christchurch City Holdings, a wholly owned investment arm of the Christchurch City Council
- Coat of arms of the City of Christchurch, granted to the Christchurch City Council in 1949
