= 1990 Auckland City mayoral by-election =

New Zealand mayoral by-election

← 1989	8 December 1990	1992 →
- Turnout: 123,456 (62.42%)

Candidate	Les Mills	Barbara Goodman	Bruce Hucker
Party	Independent	Independent	Community Independent
Popular vote	32,839	19,663	15,917
Percentage	26.59	15.92	12.89
Mayor before election
Catherine Tizard
Elected mayor
Les Mills

The 1990 Auckland City mayoral by-election was held to fill the vacant position of Mayor of Auckland. The polling was conducted using the standard first-past-the-post electoral method.

== Background ==
The by-election was triggered by the resignation of sitting Mayor Catherine Tizard after she was appointed to the position of Governor-General. The day of the announcement that Tizard would take up the position, many potential candidates announced their intentions to stand for the mayoralty. Deputy mayor Phil Warren released a press statement form Malaysia, where he was visiting, that he would be a candidate. Tizard's closest rivals in the 1986 and 1989 elections, Marie Quinn and Malcolm Moses, also confirmed they would stand. Councillor Dame Barbara Goodman would not commit, but said she was seriously considering running. Two former borough mayors, Frank Ryan of Mount Albert and David Hay of Mount Roskill, neither ruled out or in a mayoral run. Councillor Grahame Thorne ruled out standing.

Warren led in two opinion polls. The first, in September, had him leading by 15 percentage points over former Mayor of Waitemata Tim Shadbolt who was in second. A second poll a week before voting closed had his lead slip to 8.3% ahead of Goodman who was a close second. Former athlete Les Mills was polling third with Quinn in fourth place and councillor Bruce Hucker fifth.

Twenty candidates came forward for the contest, with businessman and former athlete Les Mills the winner. It was the first Mayoral by-election in Auckland since the death of Thomas Ashby in 1957.

== Results ==
The following table gives the election results:

1990 Auckland mayoral by-election
Party	Candidate	Votes	%	±%
Independent	Les Mills	32,839	26.59	
Independent	Barbara Goodman	19,663	15.92	
Community Ind.	Bruce Hucker	15,917	12.89	
Independent	Frank Ryan	11,422	9.25	
Independent	Marie Quinn	10,758	8.71	
Independent	Phil Warren	9,457	7.66	
Green	Hamish Keith	6,462	5.23	
Independent	Tim Shadbolt	5,609	4.54	
Independent	Pauline Kingi	2,630	2.13	
Independent	Rex Stanton	2,254	1.82	
Independent	Stan Lawson	1,976	1.60	
Independent	Allan Spence	1,177	0.95	
Independent	Laurence Watkins	862	0.69	−1.65
Independent	Malcolm Moses	624	0.50	−8.99
McGillicuddy Serious	Mark Servian	454	0.36	−1.16
Blokes Liberation Front	Chris Brady	380	0.30	−1.85
Independent	Phil Kozina	307	0.24	
Independent	Elizabeth Anderson	286	0.23	
Independent	Marie Rawnsley	190	0.15	
Communist League	Peter Bradley	189	0.15	
Majority		13,176	10.67	
Turnout		123,456	62.42	+20.33

== Outcome ==
After Mills won the election it was revealed that he spent $50,000 on his campaign. At the time spending limits were not imposed on local government elections, however unprecedented levels of spending the 1989 and 1990 elections prompted Minister of Local Government Warren Cooper to launch an inquiry on the matter.
