= Graeme Cairns =

New Zealand musician and politician

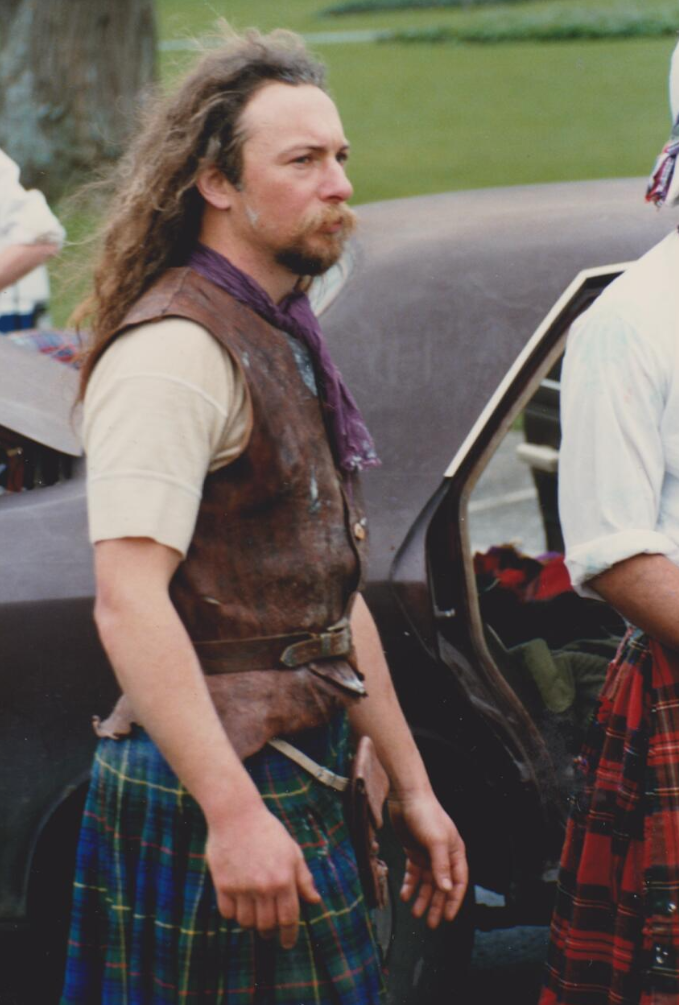
Cairns c. 1987

Graeme William Cairns (born c. 1957) is a New Zealand musician, artist, and political candidate. Originally from Scotland, he is perhaps best known for his role as "Laird McGillicuddy", chief of the Clan McGillicuddy, and as the only-ever leader of the Clan's satirical McGillicuddy Serious political party. In the 1996 election, he was, at 65, the lowest-ranked candidate on their party list. At the next election in 1999, when he stood in the Port Waikato electorate, he was in first rank on the party list. In 2006, he built a toothbrush fence as an absurdist art project.

As a musician, he continues to perform as vocalist, ukulele and bass player in the Big Muffin Serious Band. He is a professional street theatre performer and farms a small holding in the Te Pahu area of the Waikato region.

== See also ==
- McGillicuddy Serious Party
- McGillycuddy of the Reeks
