= 1992 Auckland City mayoral election =

New Zealand mayoral election

- 10 October 1992
- Turnout: 86,782

Candidate	Les Mills	Sue Corbett
Party	Independent	Alliance
Popular vote	53,407	21,711
Percentage	61.54	25.01
Mayor before election
Les Mills
Elected mayor
Les Mills

The 1992 Auckland City mayoral election was part of the New Zealand local elections held that same year. In 1992, elections were held for the Mayor of Auckland plus other local government positions including twenty-four city councillors. The polling was conducted using the standard first-past-the-post electoral method.

== Background ==
Incumbent mayor Les Mills stood for a second term and was re-elected. His main opponent was Western Bays ward councillor Sue Corbett who stood for the left-wing Alliance after leaving the centre-right Citizens & Ratepayers ticket in April 1992 over policy disagreements.

== Mayoralty results ==
The following table gives the election results:

1992 Auckland mayoral election
Party	Candidate	Votes	%	±%
Independent	Les Mills	53,407	61.54	+34.95
Alliance	Sue Corbett	21,711	25.01	
Independent	Tim Shadbolt	5,379	6.19	+1.65
Independent	Stephen Kirkwood	2,625	3.02	
Independent	Laurence Watkins	2,268	2.61	+1.92
McGillicuddy Serious	Katerina Jane Julian	1,049	1.20	
Communist League	Brigid Rotherham	343	0.39	
Majority		31,696	36.52	+25.85
Turnout		86,782		

== Ward results ==
Candidates were also elected from wards to the Auckland City Council.

Party/ticket	Councillors
Citizens & Ratepayers	17
Alliance	5
Labour	1
Independent	1
