= Coat of arms of Christchurch =

- Armiger: Christchurch City Council
- Adopted: 21 February 1949
- Crest: Kiwi
- Torse: Blue and Gold
- Shield: Four Lymphads, Mitre, Fleece and Garb and two Bars Wavy
- Supporters: Pūkeko
- Compartment: Grassy with Celmesia Flowers
- Motto: Latin: Fide Condita Fructu Beata Spe Fortis

The coat of arms of Christchurch, also known as the armorial bearings, is the official symbol of the City of Christchurch, New Zealand. It was granted to the city by the College of Arms by letters patent on 21 February 1949.

== Blazon ==
- Escutcheon: Or on a chevron gules a mitre between a fleece and a garb of the first in base two bars wavy azure on a chief of the last four lymphads sails furled, also of the first.
- Crest: On a wreath or and azure a kiwi proper.
- Supporters: On either side a pūkeko proper.

=== Translation of the blazon ===
The colour of the shield is first described. ‘Or’ is gold. Then the items on the shield are described. ‘On a Chevron’ A chevron is similar to an inverted V. ‘Gules’ is red, therefore the chevron is coloured red. What is on the chevron is then described. ‘a Mitre’ is a bishop's mitre. It position is stated to be between ‘a Fleece’, which is on the left and ‘a Garb’ on the right, which is a sheaf of wheat. A fleece is usually depicted as whole sheep. ‘Of the first’ describes the colour of these three objects and refers to the first colour mentioned, vis ‘Or’, which is gold. ‘In base two bars wavy’ means in the base of the chevron are two wavy bars. ‘Azure’ means blue so that the bars are coloured blue. A ‘Chief’ is a wide horizontal stripe at the top of the shield. ‘Of the last’ is the last colour described, which is blue. Therefore, the Chief is blue. Then the objects on the Chief are described. The ‘four Lymphads’ means four sailing ships and these ships have their ‘sails furled’ i.e. the sails are gathered into the mast rather than fully extended as when sailing. ‘also of the first’ describes the ship's colour, which is the first colour mentioned, which is gold. ‘For the Crest on a Wreath’ is the standard way of describing the helmet above the shield and the mantling. Mantling is standard on Arms and is the material-like item wrapping around the helmet. Then the Crest's colours are described ‘Or’ (gold) and ‘Azure’ (blue) and the object that is above the crest. ‘a Kiwi’ is a bird and ‘proper’ means that it is depicted in its natural colours; in this case brown. The supporters are the creatures on either side of the shield. ‘a Pūkeko’ is another bird and one is placed on each side facing the shield. Again ‘proper’ means that the bird is depicted in its natural colours. The motto is not always described in the Blazon nor is what the supporters stand on described. This is assumed by the heraldic artist.

== Significance of main features ==
=== Arms ===
The four lymphads represent the "First Four Ships" (the Charlotte-Jane, the Randolph, the Sir George Seymour and the Cressy) which arrived in 1850 with the first settlers of the area. The mitre symbolizes that Christchurch was planned as a Church of England settlement and was made a bishop's see, with city status, by Queen Victoria in 1856. The fleece and garb denote the agricultural and pastoral pursuits of the surrounding region. The two bars wavy represent the two rivers running through the city: the Avon and Heathcote.

=== Crest ===
On the blue and gold wreath of the helmet is a kiwi, a flightless native bird, which is also used as a New Zealand national emblem.

=== Supporters ===
The pūkeko (or Australasian swamphen) is a native bird found in and around the Christchurch City area.

=== Motto ===
Fide Condita Fructu Beata Spe Fortis translated means "Founded in Faith, Rich in the Fulfillment thereof, Strong in Hope for the Future". Further interpretation can be read:

1. "Fide condita" is a reference to ecclesiastical origins and name of the city, taking "fides" in the sense of the Christian Faith.
2. "Fructu beata" means "rich in the fruits of the earth" and "rich in the fruits of her industry", as well as in the fulfillment of the Founders' Faith.
3. "Spe fortis" means at once "strong in hope" and "bold in her claims upon the future".
