= Toothbrush fence =

Fence made of toothbrushes in New Zealand

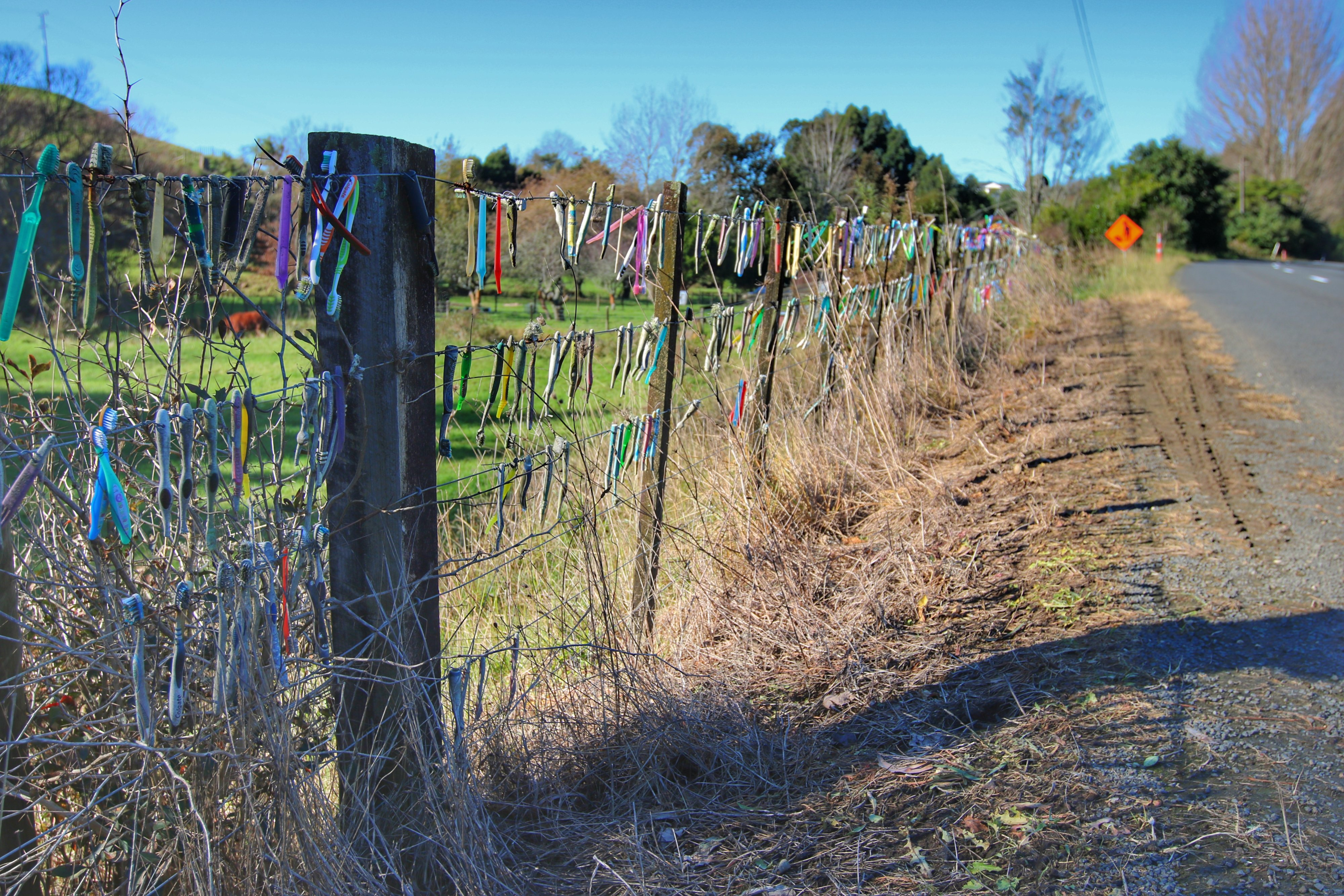
- Interactive map of the Toothbrush fence area

General information
- Architectural style: Novelty architecture
- Location: Te Pahu, Waikato, New Zealand
- Coordinates: 37°55′34.42″S 175°06′37.79″E
- Completed: 2006

Design and construction
- Architect: Graeme Cairns

The toothbrush fence is a roadside attraction in Te Pahu, Waikato, New Zealand.

Graeme Cairns built the fence in 2006 as an absurdist art project, and hung hundreds of toothbrushes along a wire fence located on a quiet rural road.

The fence was made famous on the HBO show Flight of the Conchords. Rhys Darby's character Murray Hewitt, who plays the Deputy Cultural Attaché at the New Zealand consulate, references the fence on the episode "Bret Gives Up the Dream" as a major New Zealand attraction. "We've got interesting attractions: a toothbrush fence," Murray exclaims. "Imagine that, a whole fence made out of toothbrushes!" In Season 2, the Prime Minister of New Zealand attempts to create a New Zealand Town in New York City, complete with a toothbrush fence.
