= The Trons =

Automated robot musical group from New Zealand

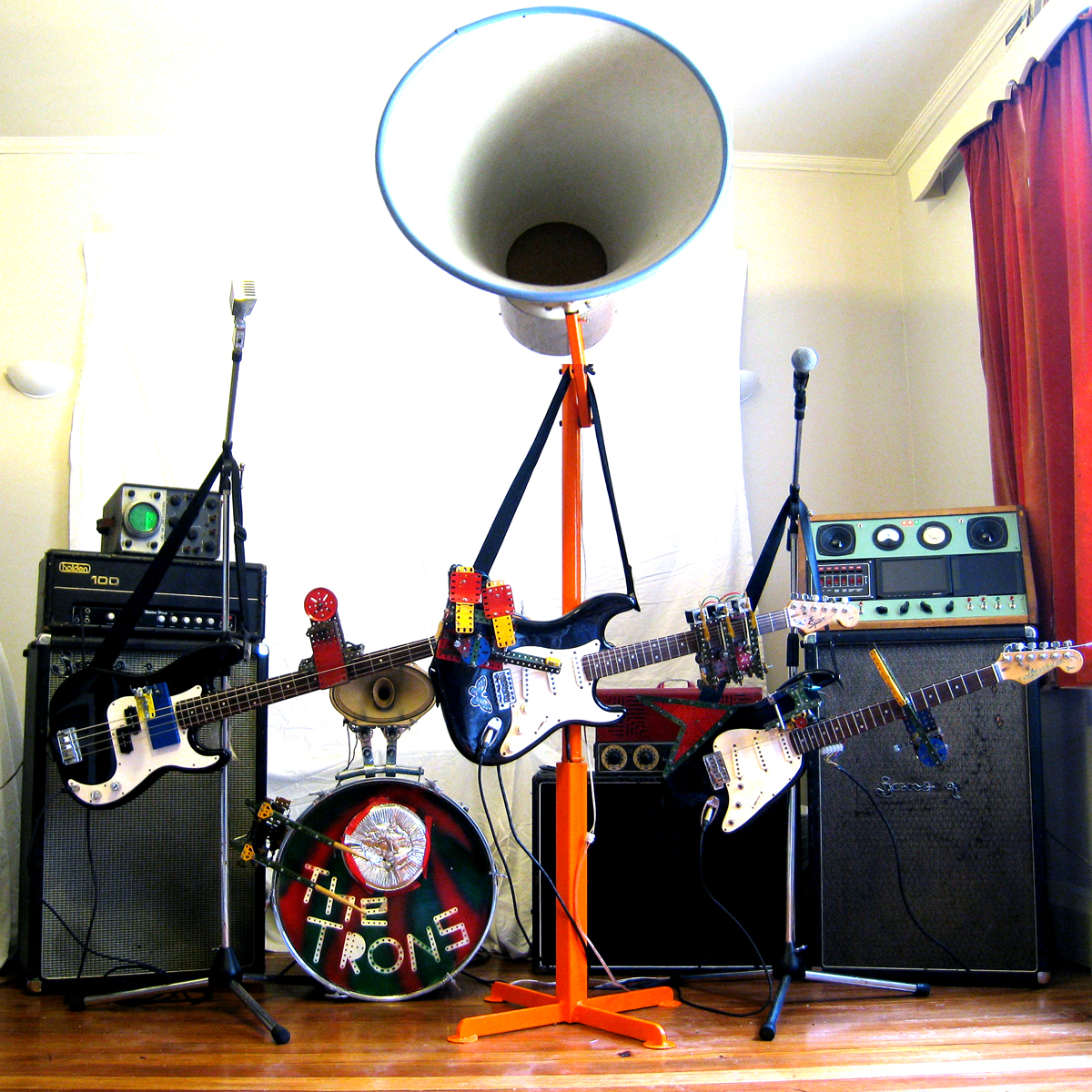
- The Trons, from left to right: Fifi, Swamp, Ham and Wiggy

Background information
- Genre: Indie
- Years active: 2000s
- Members: Ham (vox and rhythm guitar); Wiggy (lead guitar); Swamp (drums); Fifi (keyboard)
- Website: http://www.myspace.com/thtrons

The Trons are a New Zealand self-playing robot band created by the musician Greg Locke based in Hamilton. The band consists of four robots, created from scratch using a variety of spare parts and electronic equipment. The band is named after their home city's nickname, "The Tron".

== History ==
During the 1990s, while a member of the New Zealand musical duo The Emersons, Greg Locke toyed with the concept of developing a robotic drummer. This concept eventually grew into the idea of creating an entire band of robots. The four robots took about nine months to build and were created from electronic components of decommissioned photocopy-card vending machines (which formed part of Locke's daytime career), various scavenged parts and some advanced equipment. The construction of the band was assisted with a grant by the Hamilton Community Arts Council.

== About ==
The band is managed by its creator, Greg Locke, a New Zealand musician and mechanical engineer who has played in garage bands including The Hollow Grinders. The band contains no human members, consisting only of four robots named Ham, Wiggy, Swamp and Fifi.

Ham plays the rhythm guitar and does the vocals. The vocals are produced through bits of tape loop created on an old tape machine and looped.

Wiggy plays lead guitar which is single-string. It is only possible for the robots to play four chords.

Swamp performs on the drums, using a pie-plate as a snare. Swamp was written several times on the drum set that Locke purchased for this robot (he guesses that it must have been the name of the band who had used it), thus the robot's name.

Fifi plays the keyboard, using only one "hand". She originally played bass but performed poorly at it.

The robots are made from a combination of scrap parts and more complex equipment and are controlled via a computer using a "top-secret" software package. The use of "flimsy material" makes the robots' actions similar to that of a human to create human-like music.

Despite being robots, the members of the Trons are often treated as human by fans to the point where Swamp has received date requests. Locke explains this tendency to treat them as human arises from the "human element" required to create music.

== Critical reputation ==
The Trons' first dip into stardom came from their YouTube video, which received over 80,000 hits in two days, going on to amass almost a million hits in only a few months. They have received mostly positive critical acclaim, being described as "pure genius" and as being better than Grammy Award-winning British band Coldplay.

== Discography ==
=== Albums ===
- The Trons, Pieplate Records, 2011

=== Extended plays ===
- Sister Robot, 2010
