= 1989 Christchurch mayoral election =

New Zealand mayoral election

- 14 October 1989
- Turnout: 121,680 (60.56%)
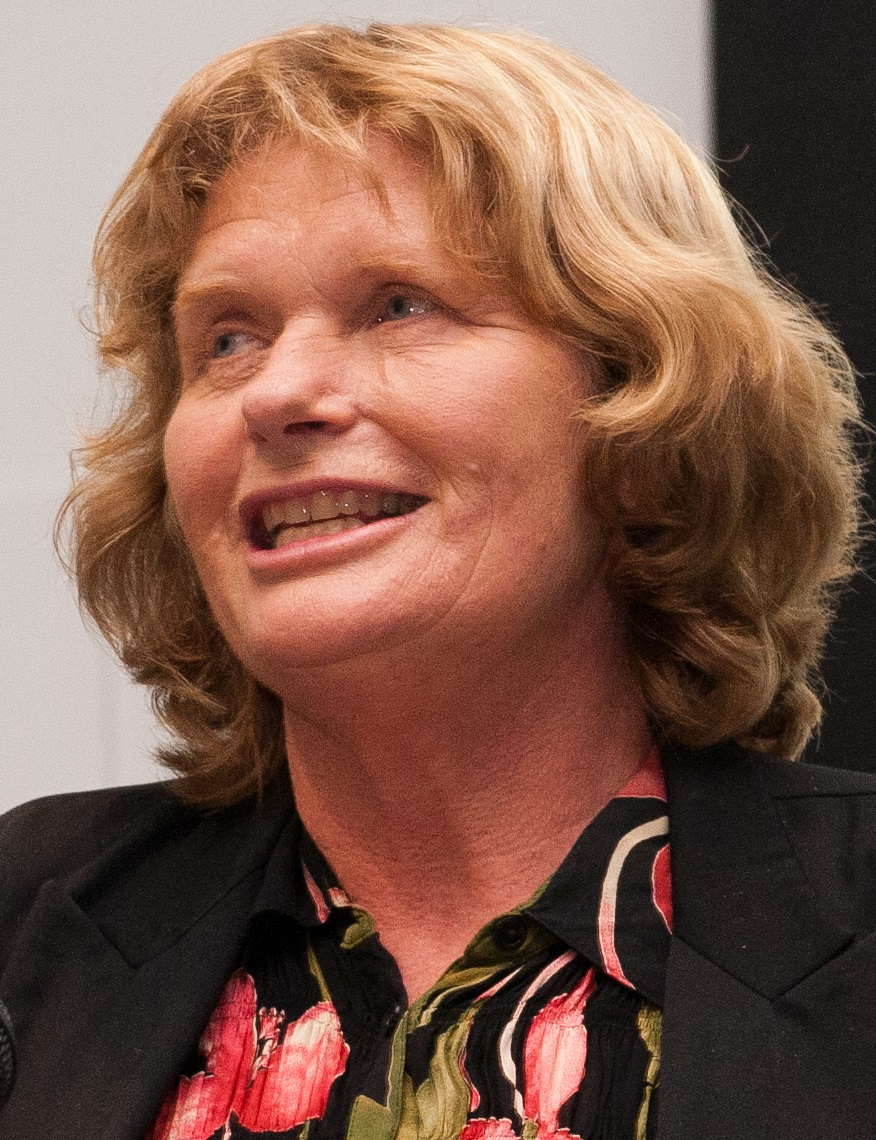

Candidate	Vicki Buck	Morgan Fahey	Margaret Murray
Party	Independent	United Citizens	Christchurch Action
Popular vote	63,824	30,891	25,666
Percentage	52.45	25.39	21.09
- Results by ward
Mayor before election
Hamish Hay
Christchurch Citizens' Association
Elected mayor
Vicki Buck
Independent

The 1989 Christchurch mayoral election was part of the New Zealand local elections held that same year. In 1989, election were held for the mayor of Christchurch plus other local government positions. The polling was conducted using the standard first-past-the-post voting method.

== Background ==
Incumbent mayor Hamish Hay had first entered the city council in 1959 and has had continuous service since then. For the last five terms, he had been mayor, and he had announced his mayoral candidacy in October 1988. Less than two months out from the election, he pulled out of the contest due to ill health.

There was deadlock on the city council with a four-way split in its membership. The Labour Party won a plurality of seats with seven seats, the United Citizens won seven, the new Christchurch Action ticket with six seats and the remaining three seats won by independent candidates. Prior to the election there was a schism on the right wing Citizens' Association resulting in two conservative tickets running against each other. Christchurch Action was set up, comprising former councillors from districts that merged with the city as part of the 1989 local government reforms.

== Results ==
Hay was succeeded by Labour Party councillor Vicki Buck who became Christchurch's first female mayor.

The following table gives the election results:

1989 Christchurch mayoral election
Party	Candidate	Votes	%	±%
Independent	Vicki Buck	63,824	52.45	
United Citizens	Morgan Fahey	30,891	25.39	
Christchurch Action	Margaret Murray	25,666	21.09	
McGillicuddy Serious	Craig Young	899	0.74	
Economic Euthenics	Tubby Hansen	400	0.33	−1.72
Informal votes		1341	1.09	−0.32
Majority		32,933	27.07	
Turnout		121,680	60.56	+2.56 approx

=== Results by ward ===
Vicki Buck polled highest in all but one of the Christchurch Wards, Margaret Murray won her own Waimairi ward, while Fahey did not get a plurality in any ward, his highest polling ward being Heathcote. Polling by The Star suggested Buck would dominate a majority of the wards although the opposing candidates disputed the figures during the campaign.

	Vicki Buck		Morgan Fahey		Margaret Murray		Others		Total
Ward	#	%	#	%	#	%	#	%	#
Burwood	5,885	58.80	2,269	22.67	1,782	17.80	73	0.73	10,009
Fendalton	4,884	41.99	3,546	30.49	3,126	26.88	75	0.64	11,631
Ferrymead	6,057	57.97	2,885	27.61	1,363	13.05	143	0.68	10,488
Hagley	4,382	59.14	1,906	25.27	980	13.23	142	1.92	7,410
Heathcote	5,771	53.78	3,308	30.83	1,526	14.22	125	1.16	10,730
Papanui	5,175	47.09	2,319	21.10	3,378	30.74	118	1.07	10,990
Pegasus	6,114	64.27	2,190	23.02	1,094	11.50	115	1.21	9,513
Riccarton	4,624	44.21	2,518	24.07	3,194	30.54	124	1.19	10,460
Shirley	5,307	55.89	2,861	30.13	1,239	13.05	118	0.94	9,496
Spreydon	5,399	56.56	2,772	29.04	1,269	13.29	105	1.10	9,545
Waimairi	4,446	38.56	2,093	18.15	4,916	42.64	74	0.64	11,529
Wigram	4,981	57.94	1,995	25.39	1,520	17.68	101	1.17	8,597
Total	63,824	52.45	30,891	25.39	25,666	21.09	1,299	1.07	121,680

== City council election result ==
Christchurch city councillors elected
Ward	Party	Elected
Burwood	Independent	Carole Evans*
Burwood	Independent	Mike Stevens
Fendalton	United Citizens	Ron Wright*
Fendalton	Action	Philip Carter
Ferrymead	United Citizens	David Cox*
Ferrymead	Labour	Charles Manning*
Hagley	Labour	Linda Constable*
Hagley	Labour	Denis O'Rourke*
Heathcote	United Citizens	Rex Arbuckle*
Heathcote	Action	Oscar Alpers
Papanui	Papanui Independent	Gordon Freeman
Papanui	Papanui Independent	Des King
Pegasus	Labour	David Close*
Pegasus	Labour	Noala Massey*
Riccarton	Action	David Buist
Riccarton	Action	Derek Anderson
Shirley	United Citizens	Newton Dodge
Shirley	United Citizens	Dennis Rich*
Spreydon	United Citizens	Morgan Fahey*
Spreydon	Labour	Alex Clark* (Note: Clark was elected on a Labour Party ticket, but resigned from the party within a week of the election and became an independent.)
Waimairi	Action	Pat Harrow
Waimairi	Action	John Hanafin
Wigram	United Citizens	Mary Corbett
Wigram	Labour	Ishwar Ganda

Footnotes: * denotes incumbents

== Aftermath ==
Buck was elected the first ever female mayor of Christchurch, and four women were elected to the council. Margaret Murray and Morgan Fahey both conceded in a friendly manner in person on the night. Fahey, her nearest opponent, became the deputy mayor.

Despite losing the mayoralty, Action performed very well and Citizens' lost its overall majority on council. There was accusation that Action split the centre-right vote and lead to no overall control on the council. Because of the Citizens' animosity towards the action team Labour and Citizens' formed an alliance on the council which resulted in Action missing out on a fair share of committee chairmanships.

Dennis Rich retained his position as team leader after the election, but Labour's team leader Alex Clark was replaced by Pegasus councillor David Close after Clark expressed a preference to focus on his regional council seat. Clark was also unable to secure a committee chairmanship, even in transport, despite his advocacy for a city owned bus company.

Although Labour candidate Arthur Adcock had won on election night by a margin of 19 votes, independent Mike Stevens refused to concede and sought multiple rounds of recounts, eventually resulting in Adcock losing his seat to Stevens. This meant Labour's election night plurality of seats was also lost. There was also legal action in the Papanui ward over the nature of election material.

Mayor Buck initially tried to get councillors to sit in alphabetical order next to each other, however, councillors ended up moving their own name plates around to sit in party/team blocs.
