= McGillicuddy Serious Party =

1984–1999 New Zealand satirical political party

- Leader: The Laird of Hamilton, Graeme Cairns
- President: Paull Cooke
- Deputy: KT Julian
- Founded: 1984
- Dissolved: 1999; 27 years ago
- Headquarters: None
- Ideology: Funism
- International affiliation: Jacobitism
- Colours: Red and Green, Tartan
- MPs: 0

The McGillicuddy Serious Party (McGSP) was a satirical political party or joke party in New Zealand in the late 20th century. Between 1984 and 1999, it stood candidates in elections - one purpose being to make the political process more entertaining. The party's logo, the head of a medieval court jester, indicated the intention to critique current systems by poking fun at them.

The party stood candidates in the 1984, 1987, 1990, 1993, 1996 and 1999 general elections and the 1986, 1989, 1992, 1995 and 1998 Local Body elections; along with local-body and parliamentary by-elections and university student association elections.

It gained its highest number of votes in the last first-past-the-post (FPP) general election in 1993, when it stood candidates in 62 out of 99 electorates and received 11,714 votes, 0.61% of the vote.

== Origins ==
The party was formed in 1984 in Hamilton as the political arm of Clan McGillicuddy (established in 1978). Members of the Clan had stood as candidates in the 1983 local-body elections in the Waikato, and the party came together in time to contest the 1984 General Election. It had a strong Scottish theme, with the renaissance of a Jacobite monarchy being one of the party's main policy planks. Candidates included street performers, students, artists and members of musical groups such as the Big Muffin Serious Band.

== Policies ==
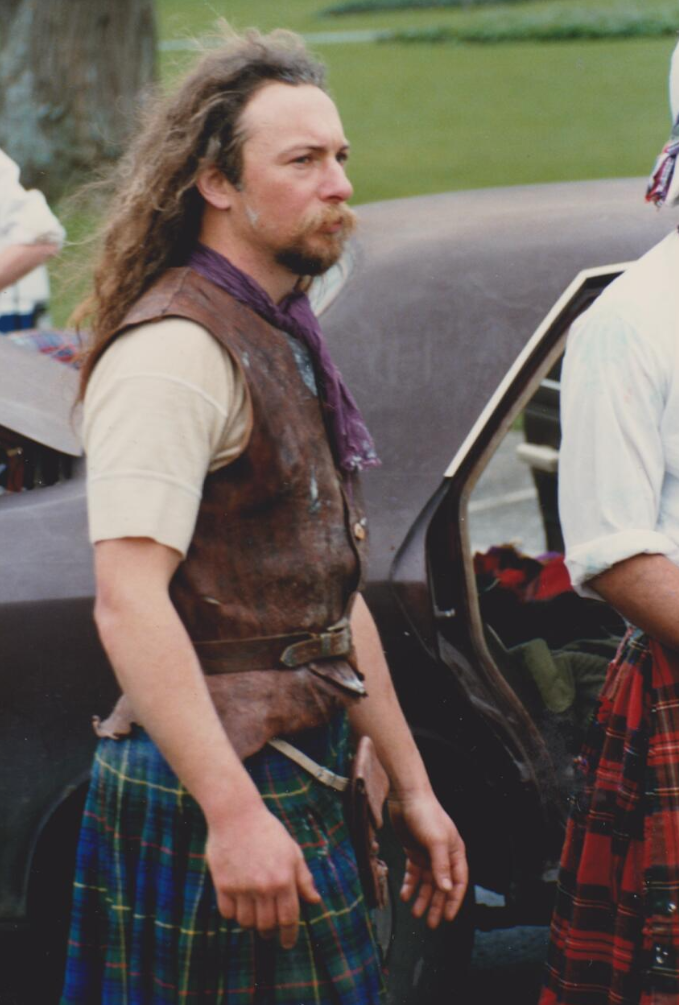
Party leader Graeme Cairns

The party selected its policies on the basis of their absurdity, but also how they tied into an over-arching grand plan. The features of this plan were: Funism (a doctrine of the most fun for the most people), The Great Leap Backwards (returning NZ to a medieval, subsistence, tribal economy) and replacing parliament with a McGillicuddy-style monarchy based on Jacobitism: a non-hereditary monarch would be appointed in a similar manner to that used to determine the Dalai Lama. The high number of New Zealanders with (some) Scottish heritage was the reason given for creating a Jacobite renaissance in the south Pacific. As time went on some McGillicuddies were influenced by Situationism. Another McGSP guiding principle was to do "Politics as Art and Art as Politics". MCGSP candidates, rallies and publicity stunts were characterised by the use of costume, hand-made props, live music and/or performance art.

Policies included:

- Free dung
- Sending out intelligence agents around the world to wipe New Zealand off published maps, thus ensuring that no-one could invade the country.
- Standing a dog for parliament in the Hobson seat in Northland. Her policies included the abolition of cars, and turning a meat-works into an organic flea-powder factory.
- The abolition of money, replacing it with chocolate fish or with sand.
- The demolition of The Beehive, parliament buildings, and all other buildings on a last-up, first-down basis.
- The diversion of aluminium production away from building US military aircraft and missiles to build giant space-mirrors to melt the polar icecaps and destroy all of the foolish greed-worshipping cities of man in one stroke, thereby returning man to the sea, which he should never have left in the first place (this the inspiration of the Admiral of the Highland Navy Aaron Franklin).
- Raising the school leaving-age to 65 (after Parliament raised the school leaving-age by one unambitious year)
- Full unemployment, or full employment through slavery
- Using beer as a National Defence strategy: leaving bottles of beer on all beaches, so that any invading army would abandon its attack and get drunk while the broken bottles would prevent the army advancing any further.
- Restricting the vote to minors: i.e., ONLY those under 18 years of age could vote (announced when Parliament lowered the voting age to 18 years, despite New Zealand reducing the voting age to 18 in 1974). The party ran its 1993 electoral advertisements during children's programming.
- Student loans for Plunket Society (or Kindergarten) attendance: prior to the 1984 election, David Lange's Labour Party promised to maintain free tertiary education, but the Education Minister, Phil Goff, introduced student fees when elected. National Party education spokesman Lockwood Smith promised a return to free education if elected, but did not carry out this promise. Most party supporters, many of them students, felt displeased that both major political parties had deemed free tertiary education unsustainable, but had deliberately lied about their intentions to attract votes.
- Abandoning male suffrage: New Zealand, the first nation to achieve women's suffrage (in 1893), made a big deal of the centenary of this at the time of the 1993 election.
- Votes for trees: New Zealanders have a reputation as environmentalists, and the University of Auckland's ex-Marxist law lecturer Klaus Bosselmann seriously advocated giving trees (and other bits of the environment) some legal standing. The party could not decide on whether native trees should have the option to vote in Māori electorates, whether male trees as well as female trees should vote, and on the status of shrubs.
- The demolition of the Auckland CBD to create a giant sundial, using the Sky Tower as the gnomon; or to protect the Sky Tower by placing a condom over it.
- Replacing the Royal New Zealand Armoured Corps with Mounted Knights, claimed as more modern. The New Zealand Army's outdated equipment became a constant source of quips and embarrassment in the 1990s—at the time Queen Alexandra's Mounted Rifles operated FV101 Scorpions and M-113s.
- Building dreadnoughts in the Tamaki Estuary: a reference to the Royal New Zealand Navy's controversial purchase of Anzac class frigates.
- An All Whites victory in the Football World Cup: both the Labour Party and the National Party used the All Blacks' victory in the 1987 Rugby World Cup in their 1990 campaigning—the All Whites stood about as much chance of winning the Football World Cup as Brazil have of winning the Rugby version.
- An indecent society: Jim Bolger's National Party used the slogan "A Decent Society".
- A potato famine: Jim Bolger's somewhat pock-marked countenance bore an unfortunate resemblance to a potato. Much to his displeasure, he became widely known as "Spud"; the Royal New Zealand Air Force, with a typically Kiwi lack of reverence, christened his Boeing 727 "Spud One".
- Limiting the speed of light to 100 km/h: 50 km/h in Mt Roskill, (Auckland's Bible Belt), because folks there preferred to stay less enlightened.
- Linking the North Island and South Island by bulldozing the Southern Alps into Cook Strait.
- Post-natal abortion: making abortion illegal, but any mother could kill her child up to the age of 18, provided she did it with her own hands. The party designed this policy to offend all sides in the abortion debate. The fundamentalist Christian Heritage Party used abortion as a major policy.
- Mandatory homosexuality for 33% of the population—also devised to annoy the fundamentalists.
- Free castration
- Setting up a Frivolous Fraud Office to investigate any fraud deemed too silly for the Serious Fraud Office
- Air bags for the New Zealand Stock Exchange (following the 1987 stock market crash)
- Replacing the Queen's chain with hemp: the Labour Party had a policy of protecting and extending the Queen's chain (publicly accessible land bordering watercourses), forcing farmers and iwi to allow public access to waterways. Candidate Dominic Worthington proposed replacing the chain with more environmentally sound hemp; with the Queen, of course, replaced by Prince Geoffie the reluctant. Rather than limiting the chain to protecting water in aqueous form, the King's hemp would also serve to hold together water in solid form, as in the ice in glaciers and in the Ross Dependency (in particular, the Ross Ice Shelf, alleviating environmentalists' concerns that the ice shelf might collapse and raise sea-levels). Ultimately, the policy envisaged that technology would regress far enough for it to become feasible to lasso water in gaseous form (i.e. clouds).
- Fixing accountants in concrete and using them as traffic barriers, occasionally accompanied by a pledge to steal some of the Monster Raving Loony Party's other policies as well—possibly a reference to political parties accusing each other of stealing policies, or possibly just silliness.
- Good weather (but only if voters behaved).
- Full employment by carpeting the national highways: this would also save wear and tear on tyres
- Breaking its promises

Note: not all of the above were party-wide policies outlined in manifestoes - candidates had creative licence to come up with their own policies.

== Peak and decline ==
The party attracted a surprising level of support, and became one of the larger parties outside parliament. On a number of occasions, particularly following the introduction of the mixed member proportional (MMP) electoral system, pundits predicted that the party might actually win parliamentary representation, but this never happened. When the major parties boycotted the Tauranga by-election 1993 in 1993, the party's candidate Greg Pittams, who appeared in nationwide newspapers during this campaign wearing his "emperor's new kilt" outfit, consisting of only a shirt and sporran, finished second to Winston Peters. Votes for the party presumably most often represented protest votes, something that the party encouraged with one of its slogans: "If you want to waste your vote, vote for us."

In the 1996 general election, the party put up 65 list candidates; 45 candidates stood as an electorate candidate.

The introduction of MMP Mixed Member Proportional representation at the 1996 election changed the political landscape: there were more smaller parties to vote for with more of a chance of getting into Parliament. The McGSP percentage of the vote fell. The 1999 election campaign proved a disappointment. The party gained only 0.15% of the vote, a considerable drop. In addition to this, the increased reporting required from small parties under MMP changed the 'work to fun ratio' of taking part in elections.

== Disbandment and deregistration ==
Shortly after the 1999 election, the party disbanded and the Electoral Commission officially deregistered it as a political party. Party leader Graeme Cairns marked the event and did penance for the loss by placing himself in stocks in Garden Place in Hamilton in December 1999 as disgruntled party members pelted him with rotten fruit.

== Electoral results ==
=== General elections ===
The following table summarises the party's support in general elections.

Election	# electorate votes	% of electorate vote	# party votes	% of party vote	# candidates	Seats	Result
1984	178	0.01%	-	-	3	0	Labour victory
1987	2,990	0.16%	-	-	19	0	Labour victory
1990	9,918	0.54%	-	-	59	0	National victory
1993	11,714	0.61%	-	-	62	0	National majority
1996	12,177	0.59%	5,990	0.29%	65	0	National majority
1999	3,633	0.18%	3,191	0.15%	64	0	Labour majority
2008	259	0.008%	-	-	1	0	National majority

=== By-elections ===
By-election	Year	Candidate	# votes	% of vote	Placing	Result
Tamaki	1992	Adrian Holroyd	73	0.42%	7th	National hold
Tauranga	1993	Greg Pittams	271	2.15%	2nd	Independent gain
Selwyn	1994	Tim Owens	26	0.12%	8th	National hold
Taranaki-King Country	1998	Paul Cooke	76	0.38%	11th	National hold

=== Mayoral elections ===
City	Year	Candidate	# votes	% of vote	Placing
Auckland	1989	Mark Servian	1,270	1.52%	7th
Auckland	1990	Mark Servian	454	0.36%	15th
Auckland	1992	Katerina Jane Julian	1,018	1.21%	6th
Auckland	1995	Marc de Boer	558	0.54%	7th
Auckland	1998	Derek Craig	548	0.46%	10th
Christchurch	1989	Craig Young	882	0.72%	4th
Christchurch	1992	Tony Greer	1,136	1.08%	4th
Christchurch	1995	Barry Bryant	1,301	1.22%	3rd
Hamilton	1986	Graeme Cairns	1,031	2.91%	4th
Hamilton	1992	Mark Servian	586	1.74%	5th
Hamilton	1995	Craig Beere	453	1.30%	5th
Porirua	1995	Grant Prankerd	210	1.37%	5th
Tauranga	1995	Karen Summerhays	210	0.75%	9th
Wellington	1986	Mark Servian	260	0.69%	4th
Wellington	1989	John Morrison	1,015	1.93%	6th
Wellington	1992	John Morrison	299	0.52%	8th
Wellington	1995	Ross Gardner	470	0.78%	9th

== McGillicuddy candidates ==
A number of former members went on to stand as candidates for "real" parties. Former MP and co-leader of the Green party, Metiria Turei, formerly held party membership, and was number 27 on the party list for the 1999 General Election.

Other prominent candidates from this first generation of electioneering included founder and Party Leader Graeme Cairns, the "Laird of Hamilton"; Mark Servian; KT Julian, a long-time Party Deputy Leader; Adrian Holroyd; Cecil G. Murgatroyd (who subsequently stood against Australian Prime Minister Bob Hawke under the Imperial British Conservative Party banner); Sam Buchanan; Steve Richards; Donna Demente; and Penni Bousfield.

== Younger pretenders ==
Some of the party's members became upset at the cancellation of their lifetime membership. In July 2005 a "McGillicuddy Serious Party" put out a press-release announcing plans to participate in the 2005 election, one initial policy involving replacing MPs with harmless jargon-generators.

One candidate stood under the McGillicuddy Serious banner in the 2008 general election: Steve Richards contested the West Coast-Tasman electorate and received 259 votes.

== Current status ==
Despite the demise of the party, Clan McGillicuddy continued to hold regular public events for some time. A pacifist battle in Oamaru on 31 December 2007 saw McGillicuddy "Martians" take on Alf's Imperial Army in an enactment of The War of the Worlds. YouTube hosts a video of this battle. On 31 December 2013, there was a pacifist battle in Waitati in which the McGillicuddies defended Castle Almond (the castle-like home of one their members) against an "attack" by the local Waitati Militia.

== See also ==
- List of frivolous political parties
