= Vicki Buck =

Mayor of Christchurch (born 1955)

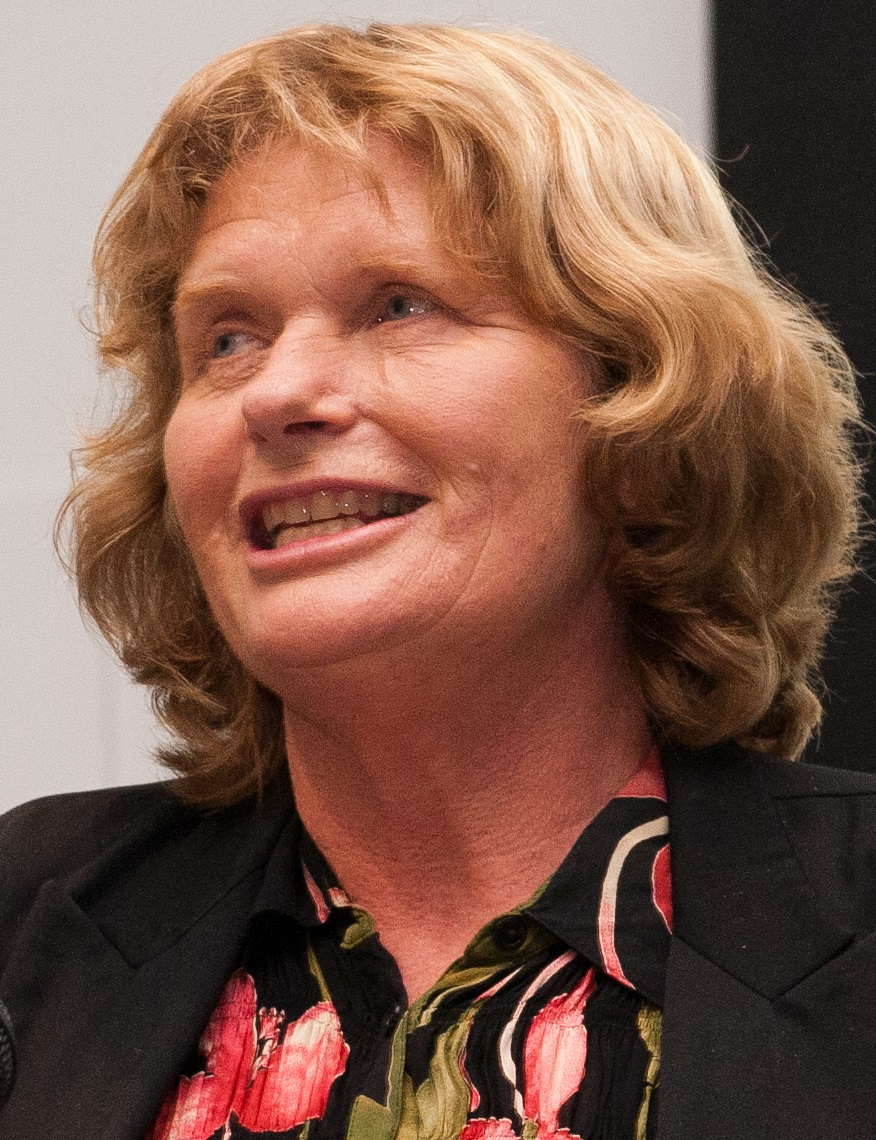
- Buck in 2010

43rd Mayor of Christchurch
- In office 1989–1998
- Preceded by: Hamish Hay
- Succeeded by: Garry Moore

Riccarton Ward
- In office 20 October 2016 – 12 October 2019
- Preceded by: Ward created
- Succeeded by: Catherine Chu

Riccarton-Wigram Ward
- In office 24 October 2013 – 8 October 2016 Serving with Jimmy Chen
- Preceded by: Helen Broughton
- Succeeded by: Ward abolished

Personal details
- Born: 16 July 1955 (age 70)
- Party: Labour Party (1972–1989)

Vicki Susan Buck (born 16 July 1955) is a New Zealand politician. She was Mayor of Christchurch for nine years from 1989 to 1998. Prior to being Mayor, Buck was a city councillor for the Pegasus ward, having been elected as the youngest city councillor in New Zealand at the age of 19. She retired after three mayoral terms, having been very popular.

Buck made a political comeback in the 2013 local elections, as a city councillor for the Riccarton-Wigram ward, and returned the highest number of votes across all city wards. Subsequent to the election, she accepted the deputy mayor role. She decided not to stand in the 2019 local elections, marking the end of her councillorship.

== Early life and family ==
Buck was born on 16 July 1955, and grew up in North Beach (now North New Brighton), an eastern suburb of Christchurch. She was educated at Christchurch Girls' High School. She went on to study at the University of Canterbury from 1972, graduating Bachelor of Arts in 1975 and Master of Arts with honours in political sciences in 1977. In 1986, she married Robert Donald McKay, but their marriage ended during Buck's time as Christchurch mayor.

== Political life ==
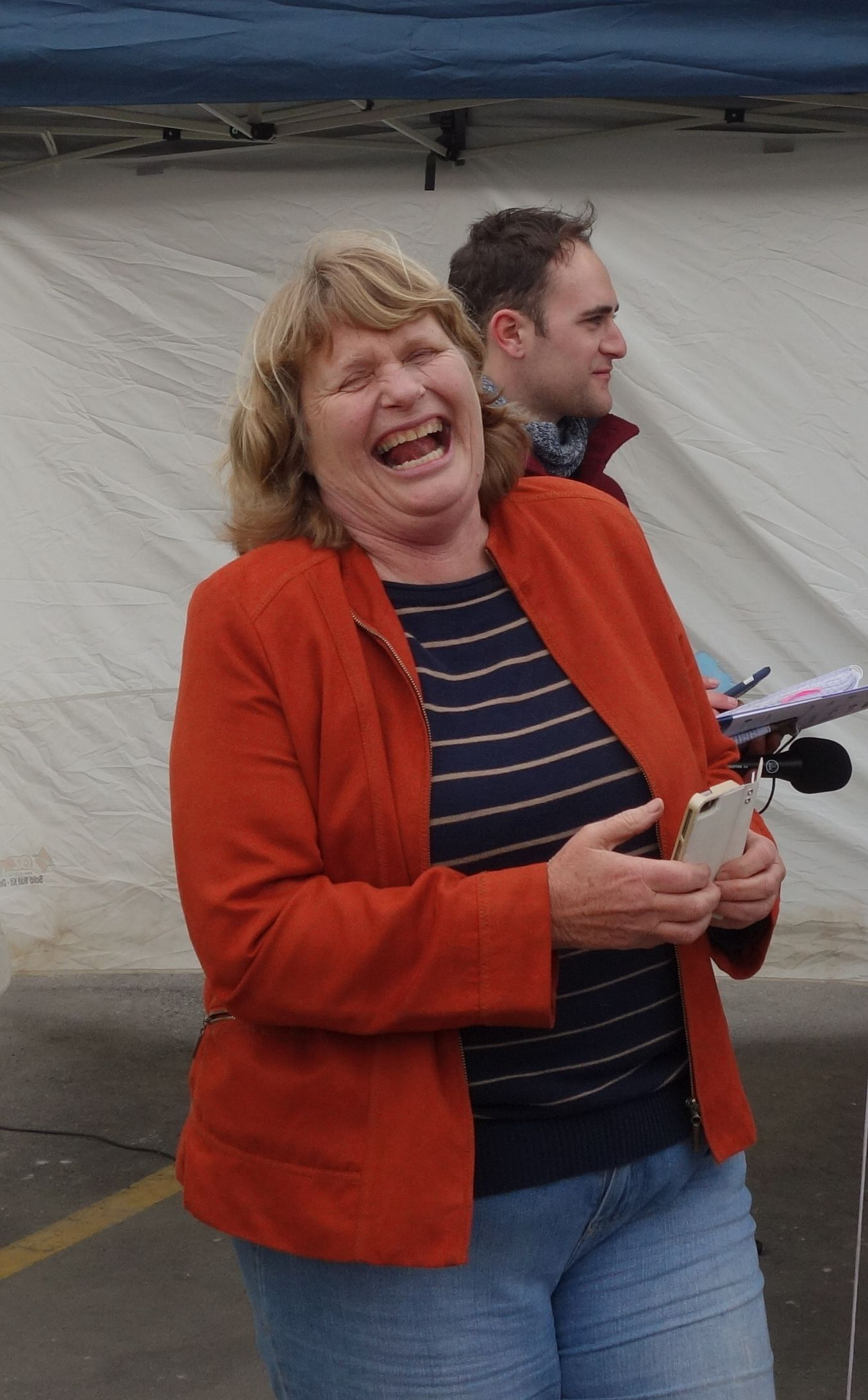
Buck in 2015

External image
- Buck at age 19

Buck joined the Labour Party in 1972 aged 16. At age 19, she stood in the 1974 Christchurch mayoral election as a Labour candidate for the Pegasus ward. Four seats in the ward were contested by ten candidates. Buck came fifth, narrowly beaten by Peter William Anderson in fourth. Before special votes were counted, it had been thought that she would beat incumbent councillor Bill Massey, a fellow Labour member, who was just 65 votes ahead.

In March 1975, Bill Massey unexpectedly died, triggering a by-election. The Labour Party chose Buck to stand in this by-election, which she won by a large margin. At the time, she was New Zealand's youngest city councillor.

Despite her youth, she soon made an impact around the council table and attracted the attention of media. A 1978 reshuffle of council committee chairmanships resulted in the proposal that Buck take over the Community Services Committee, but this was blocked by Mayor Hamish Hay and his colleagues on the Citizens ticket.

She was one of five Local Government Commissioners working from 1984 to 1989 on a major reorganisation of local government in New Zealand.

In preparation for her October 1989 mayoral bid, Buck resigned from the Labour Party in June that year to be able to run as an independent. She was successful and became the city's first woman mayor. An active and vigorous leader, she is widely credited with leading a turnaround in the perception of Christchurch as a city.

In 1990, Buck received the New Zealand 1990 Commemoration Medal, and in 1993 she was awarded the New Zealand Suffrage Centennial Medal.

== Life after politics ==
More recently she has:

- been a member of the New Zealand government's Science and Innovation Advisory Council
- been chair of the NZ Learning Discovery Trust, which in turn has set up Discovery 1 and Unlimited state schools in central Christchurch. The schools are based on the student being central in their own individual learning.
- initiated the LIFT Trust with five schools in Linwood to create free tertiary education for students who may otherwise not enjoy this because of the fees barrier.
- been director and co-founder of Aquaflow Bionomic Corporation, a bio-fuel company using wild algae, and cleaning dirty and contaminated water.
- been director and co-founder of Celsias.com, a website for business and community groups which is based on the premise that Governments are not acting quickly enough on climate change and it will be up to all of us to act.
- been director and co-founder of Carbonscape, aimed at sequestering carbon from waste biomass through microwave technology.
- been on the NZ advisory board of Craigmore Sustainables, involved in carbon forestry.

In 2008 she was nominated by a panel commissioned by The Guardian newspaper as one of 50 people who could reverse the effects of climate change.

== Political comeback ==
Buck stood as an independent candidate in the 2013 local elections in the Riccarton-Wigram ward as councillor for Christchurch City Council. She supported Lianne Dalziel's mayoral campaign, although initially declined to become deputy mayor. On 12 October 2013, Buck was returned with the highest number of votes of any of the council candidates across the city. In late October, Buck changed her mind and decided to accept the role of deputy mayor, after the role was re-framed to include more than ceremonial duties. She served in this role until 2016.

In June 2019, she announced that she would not be seeking re-election in October.

Political offices
Preceded by Hamish Hay	Mayor of Christchurch; 1989–1998	Succeeded by Garry Moore
