= Les Mills =

New Zealand athlete and politician (1934–2026)

Les Mills CNZM MBE JP
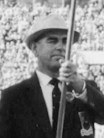
- Mills in 1960

36th Mayor of Auckland City
- In office 1990–1998
- Preceded by: Catherine Tizard
- Succeeded by: Christine Fletcher

Personal details
- Born: Leslie Roy Mills; 1 November 1934 Auckland, New Zealand
- Died: 29 June 2026 (aged 91)
- Spouse: Colleen Maree Mills (d. 2005)
- Children: 2; including Phillip
- Sports career
- Height: 188 cm (6 ft 2 in)
- Weight: 121 kg (267 lb)
- Sport: Athletics
- Events: Shot put, discus throw
- Club: Auckland

Sports achievements and titles
- Personal bests: Shot put – 19.80 m (1967); Discus – 61.52 m (1971)
Medal record
Men's athletics
Representing New Zealand
Commonwealth Games
Silver medal – second place	1958 Cardiff	Discus throw
Gold medal – first place	1966 Kingston	Discus throw
Silver medal – second place	1966 Kingston	Shot put
Silver medal – second place	1970 Edinburgh	Discus throw
Bronze medal – third place	1970 Edinburgh	Shot put

Leslie Roy Mills CNZM MBE JP (1 November 1934 – 29 June 2026) was a New Zealand track and field athlete, businessman and politician. He represented New Zealand at the Olympic Games and Commonwealth Games over two decades, competing in the shot put and discus throw. He won a total of five medals at the Commonwealth Games including gold in the discus at the 1966 Games.

Mills opened his first gym in 1968, giving his name to Les Mills International, a fitness-centric company founded by his son Phillip Mills. Mills later went on to serve as the mayor of Auckland, New Zealand's largest city, from 1990 to 1998.

== Athletics career ==
- 1952: Wins New Zealand Junior shot put and discus titles
- 1958 British Empire and Commonwealth Games: discus, silver medal
- 1960 Summer Olympics: Captain and flagbearer for the New Zealand Team. Placed 11th in the shot put, and 28th in the discus.
- 1962 British Empire and Commonwealth Games: 5th place discus, 6th place shot put.
- 1964 Summer Olympics: 7th place shot put.
- 1966 British Empire and Commonwealth Games: gold medal discus, silver medal shot put.
- 1968 Summer Olympics: Competed injured, 11th place shot put.
- 1970 British Commonwealth Games: silver medal in the discus and a bronze in shot put.
- 1970 AAA Championships: winner
- 1971 AAA Championships: winner
- 1972 Summer Olympics: Olympic flagbearer for New Zealand. 14th place discus, 23rd shot put.
- 1974–1976 National Sports Director of Papua New Guinea.
- 1977–1979 First Director of Coaching in Athletics for New Zealand.
- 1978 Commonwealth Games New Zealand Coach.

Mills trained New Zealand throwers including Beatrice Faumuina. His personal best for the shot put was a New Zealand national record for 44 years, until 16-year-old Jacko Gill broke it on 23 April 2011 with a throw of 20.01 m.

== Mayor of Auckland City ==
Mills served as the mayor of Auckland City between 1990 and 1998. His mayoral term commenced with a by-election in 1990 after the resignation of Catherine Tizard, who had been appointed governor-general. The new council had been formed following local body amalgamation in 1989 which saw many of the district borough councils merged into one larger city. Mills's first term oversaw the merger of these many district boroughs into one city. The Aotea Centre was also opened at the beginning of his term. Other initiatives which commenced on Mills' watch as mayor included the introduction of the green "wheelie bins", metered user charges for water use, council assets like golf courses were leased to private management, and the city also quit some assets that no longer were a priority, like its abattoir.

Other major events during Mills's tenure included work commencing on the America's Cup Village at the Auckland Viaduct, the commencement and opening of the Sky Tower and casino complex that now dominates the Auckland skyline, the redevelopment of the Civic Theatre, and refurbishment of the Auckland Town Hall.

During this period, the 1998 Auckland power crisis occurred, which shut down most of the inner city. Mills' Britomart Transport Centre plans also came under some criticism as being too focused on property development and not enough on transport. His successor Christine Fletcher led plans for a scaled down Britomart Station without the large property development plans.

He was defeated in a three-way contest against businessman Richard Holden and eventual winner Christine Fletcher in 1998. Mills himself was absent for most of the election campaign, leading the New Zealand team at the 1998 Commonwealth Games, and mentoring the gold medal-winning discus thrower Beatrice Faumuina.

== Death ==
Mills died on 29 June 2026, at the age of 91.

== Honours and awards ==
In the 1973 Queen's Birthday Honours, Mills was appointed a Member of the Order of the British Empire, for services to sport. In the 2002 Queen's Birthday and Golden Jubilee Honours, he was made a Companion of the New Zealand Order of Merit, for services to local government and sport.

In 2022, Mills and his son Phillip and daughter-in-law Jackie Mills were jointly inducted into the New Zealand Business Hall of Fame.

Political offices
Preceded by Catherine Tizard	Mayor of Auckland City; 1990–1998	Succeeded by Christine Fletcher
Awards
Preceded by Harry Kent	Lonsdale Cup of the New Zealand Olympic Committee; 1971	Succeeded by Rod Dixon
Preceded by Duncan Laing	Halberg Awards – Coach of the Year; 1997	Succeeded by Ron Cheatley
