= Communist League (New Zealand) =

- Founded: 1969
- Split from: Communist Party of New Zealand
- Ideology: Communism; Marxism-Leninism
- Political position: Far-left
- International affiliation: Pathfinder tendency
- Colours: Red

The Communist League is a New Zealand Marxist-Leninist party.

== History ==
The party was founded in 1969 by students from Victoria University of Wellington, and was originally named the Socialist Action League. The new party rejected the more established groups such as the Communist Party as too authoritarian, conservative, and unimaginative, but at the same time, rejected many of the newer communist groups in New Zealand as disorganised and unfocused. It was aligned with the Fourth International (FI), an international grouping of Trotskyist parties. The party achieved a certain amount of public recognition for its role in protests against the Vietnam War, and regularly engaged in protests against adventurist United States foreign policy, South African apartheid, in defence of the pro-choice side of the abortion debate, as well as supporting LGBT rights in New Zealand, during the 1970s and 1980s. During those decades, the SAL maintained a newspaper of its own, Socialist Action. According to the National Library of New Zealand serials catalogue, it ran from 1969 to 1988.

In the 1980s, the Socialist Workers Party in the United States broke away from Trotskyism, and left the FI. A number of other parties in FI also chose to leave, including the Socialist Action League in New Zealand. Those members of the Socialist Action League who did not agree with this departure from Trotskyism and the FI were expelled or resigned. Later, the Socialist Action League renamed itself the Communist League, following the pattern of the other pro-SWP parties that had left the FI. Today, the party is still associated with the Socialist Workers Party's so-called Pathfinder tendency.

The League has held public meetings called Militant Labour Forums. The Militant newspaper and books published by Pathfinder Press have been distributed from the Pathfinder Bookshop in the Auckland suburb of Onehunga.

=== Candidacy for parliament ===
In every general election between 1990 and 2020, at least two candidates have sought election to parliament under the Communist League name. None have been successful, with each candidate only receiving a few dozen votes each time. Candidates have also stood at multiple city council elections and at least one by-election, also without success. The Communist League did not run any candidates in the 2023 general election.

== Electoral results (1990–2020) ==
| Election | candidates | seats won | votes | % of vote |
|---|---|---|---|---|
| 1990 | 9 | 0 | 210 | 0.01 |
| 1993 | 2 | 0 | 84 | 0.00 |
| 1996 | 2 | 0 | 99 | 0.00 |
| 1999 | 2 | 0 | 89 | 0.00 |
| 2002 | 2 | 0 | 171 | 0.01 |
| 2005 | 2 | 0 | 107 | 0.00 |
| 2008 | 2 | 0 | 74 | 0.00 |
| 2011 | 2 | 0 | 95 | 0.00 |
| 2014 | 2 | 0 | 135 | 0.00 |
| 2017 | 2 | 0 | 109 | 0.00 |
| 2020 | 2 | 0 | 109 | 0.00 |

== Auckland mayor (1990–2019) ==
| Election | Candidate | votes | % of vote | position |
|---|---|---|---|---|
| 1990 | Peter Bradley | 189 | 0.15 | 20th |
| 1992 | Brigid Rotherham | 310 | 0.36 | 7th |
| 1995 | James Robb | 228 | 0.22 | 11th |
| 1998 | Felicity Coggan | 312 | 0.26 | 13th |
| 2001 | Felicity Coggan | 610 | 0.56 | 9th |
| 2004 | Felicity Coggan | 452 | 0.35 | 7th |
| 2007 | Felicity Coggan | 735 | 0.65 | 10th |
| 2010 | Annalucia Vermunt | 451 | 0.09 | 21st |
| 2013 | Annalucia Vermunt | 856 | 0.25 | 17th |
| 2016 | Patrick Brown | 1,817 | 0.46 | 11th |
| 2019 | Annalucia Vermunt | 1,055 | 0.28 | 19th |

The Communist League did not contest the 2022 Auckland mayoral election.

== See also ==
- Political parties in New Zealand
