= New Lynn =

- Suburb
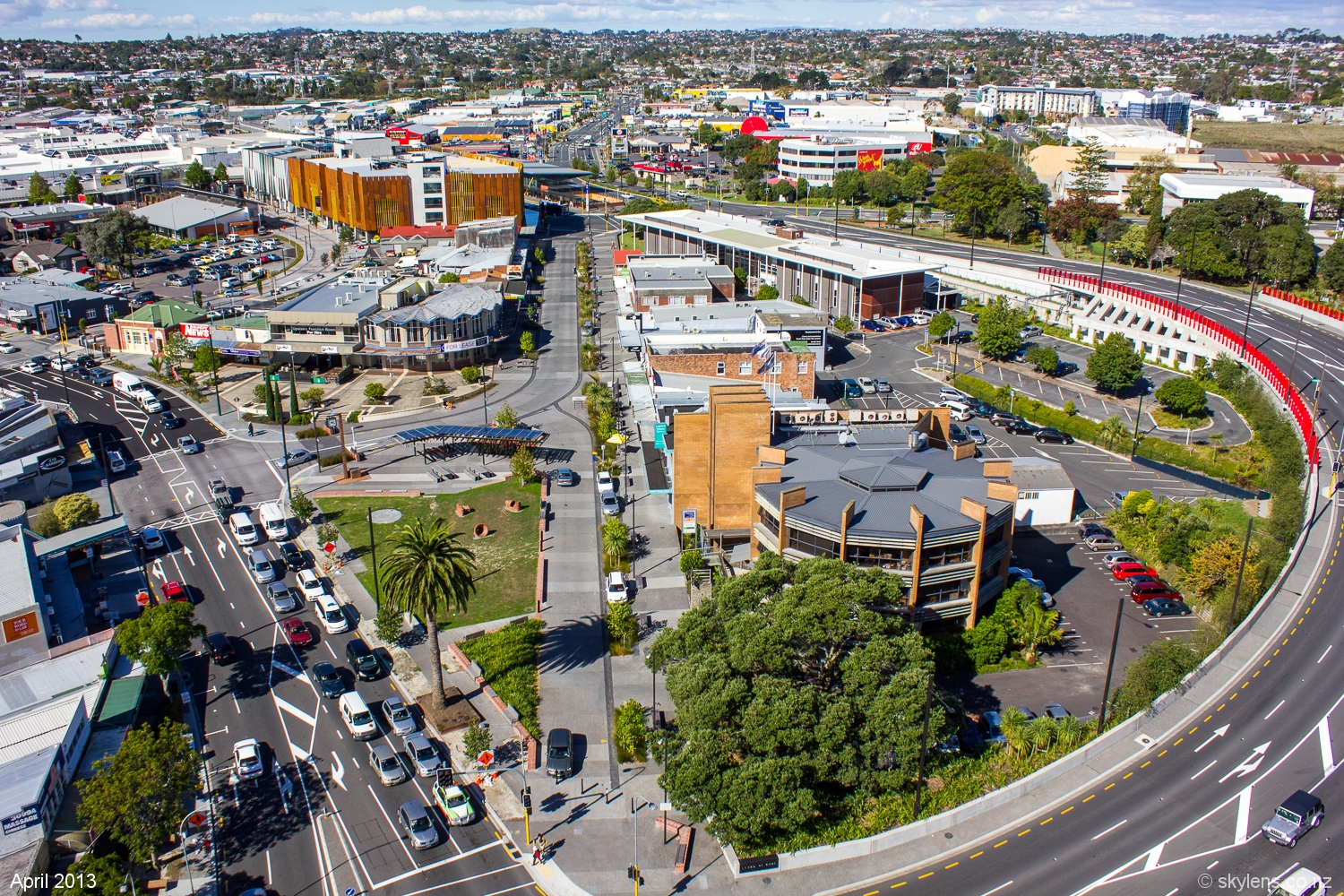
- Aerial view of New Lynn town centre in 2013
- Interactive map of New Lynn
- Coordinates: 36°54′35″S 174°41′00″E
- Country: New Zealand
- City: Auckland
- Local authority: Auckland Council
- Electoral ward: Whau ward
- Local board: Whau Local Board

Area
  - Land: 636 ha (1,570 acres)

Population (June 2025)
  - Total: 23,800
  - Density: 3,740/km^{2} (9,690/sq mi)
- Railway stations: New Lynn railway station Fruitvale Road railway station

Kelston	(Whau River)	Avondale
Glen Eden	New Lynn	New Windsor
Titirangi	Green Bay	Blockhouse Bay

New Lynn is a residential suburb in West Auckland, New Zealand, located 10 kilometres to the southwest of the Auckland city centre. The suburb is located along the Whau River, one of the narrowest points of the North Island, and was the location of Te Tōanga Waka, a traditional waka portage between the Waitematā and Manukau harbours.

The settlement developed in the early 20th century due to the brick and pottery industry, and in 1963 became a major commercial centre for Auckland with the opening of LynnMall, the first American-style shopping centre in New Zealand. Since 2010, New Lynn has been the focus of large-scale urban development, with the introduction of medium and high density housing close to the town centre and train station.

== History ==
=== Early history and establishment ===
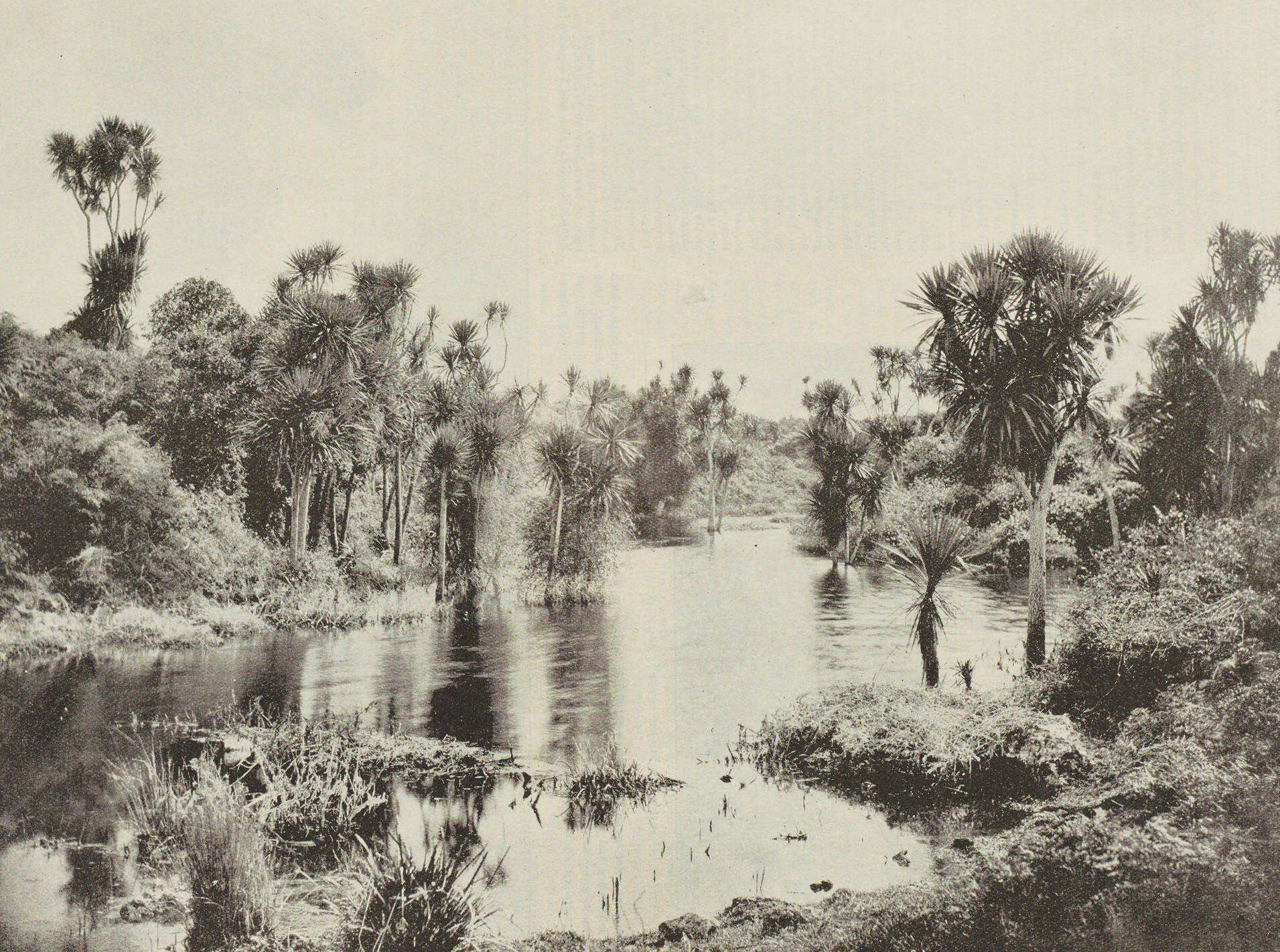
A view of the Whau River near New Lynn in 1895

The New Lynn area and the Whau River are a part of the traditional rohe of Te Kawerau ā Maki, an iwi that traces their ancestry to some of the earliest inhabitants of the Auckland Region. The traditional name for the area is Te Rewarewa, referring to a local creek. The Whau River was a borderland, marking the division of lands between Te Kawerau ā Maki and the Tāmaki Māori iwi of the Auckland isthmus: Ngāti Whātua Ōrākei and in earlier times, Waiohua. The Whau River was one of the narrowest points between the Waitematā Harbour on the east coast of the island, and the Manukau Harbour on the west. Te Tōanga Waka, one of the most important portages in the area, allowed for waka to be transported between the two harbours, along the Whau River, the Avondale Stream (Wai Tahurangi), and a short overland path, marked in modern times by a road named Portage Road. Kotuitanga (Ken Maunder Park) marks the point where waka were no longer able to be paddled, and was traditionally a site used for waka construction. The banks of the Whau River were the locations of many seasonal fishing settlements.

When European colonisation of the Auckland Region began, New Lynn was known as a barren scrubland. In 1845, the first wooden bridge was built across the Whau River. New Lynn was named by Frederick Utting, who surveyed the western Whau area in 1863. He named the area after King's Lynn in Norfolk, England, as the area reminded him of the countryside of his homeland. Land at New Lynn was first auctioned in 1865, but growth in the area was slow until the 1910s.

The first European settlers arrived in the area in the 1850s, primarily farmers and people involved with the kauri logging and gum digging industries. In 1865, New Lynn became a trade centre when the port of New Lynn opened on the Whau River. Boats could only operate in the port during narrow stretches of time at high tide, and otherwise rested in the mud of the river.

New Lynn grew significantly due to the brick and ceramics industries. The first brickyard was established by Dr Daniel Pollen on the Whau River at Rosebank in 1852. He brought in brickmakers from Staffordshire in England, four of whom later established their own yards along the river. By 1870 there were 13 brick and clay yards on the local waterways, exploiting the high-quality clay in the area. In the 1870s, the largest yards produced between 10,000 and 15,000 bricks per week. Many of the ceramics companies failed due to the 1880s depression, competition, and changing preferences to use wood rather than bricks for construction. The first brick kiln opened in New Lynn in 1861, and of the 39 brick and clayworks of West Auckland, 23 were located on the Whau River, with most concentrated around New Lynn.

In March 1880, the New Lynn railway station opened, connecting New Lynn to Auckland by rail and stimulating growth in the area. Two years later, Alfred Ramsden constructed the New Lynn Hotel on Great North Road, which closed in 1908 due to their liquor license lapsing during the temperance movement in New Zealand. The building was demolished in July 2008, due to deterioration. The first school in the area, New Lynn School, opened in 1888 at the modern site of Kelston Girls' College. The school was relocated to current site in 1914.

A new area of New Lynn was subdivided in 1902, to the south of the railway station. Known as the Hetana Hamlet, this was named after Prime Minister Richard Seddon, who was known to Māori by the name Hetana.

=== Suburban development ===
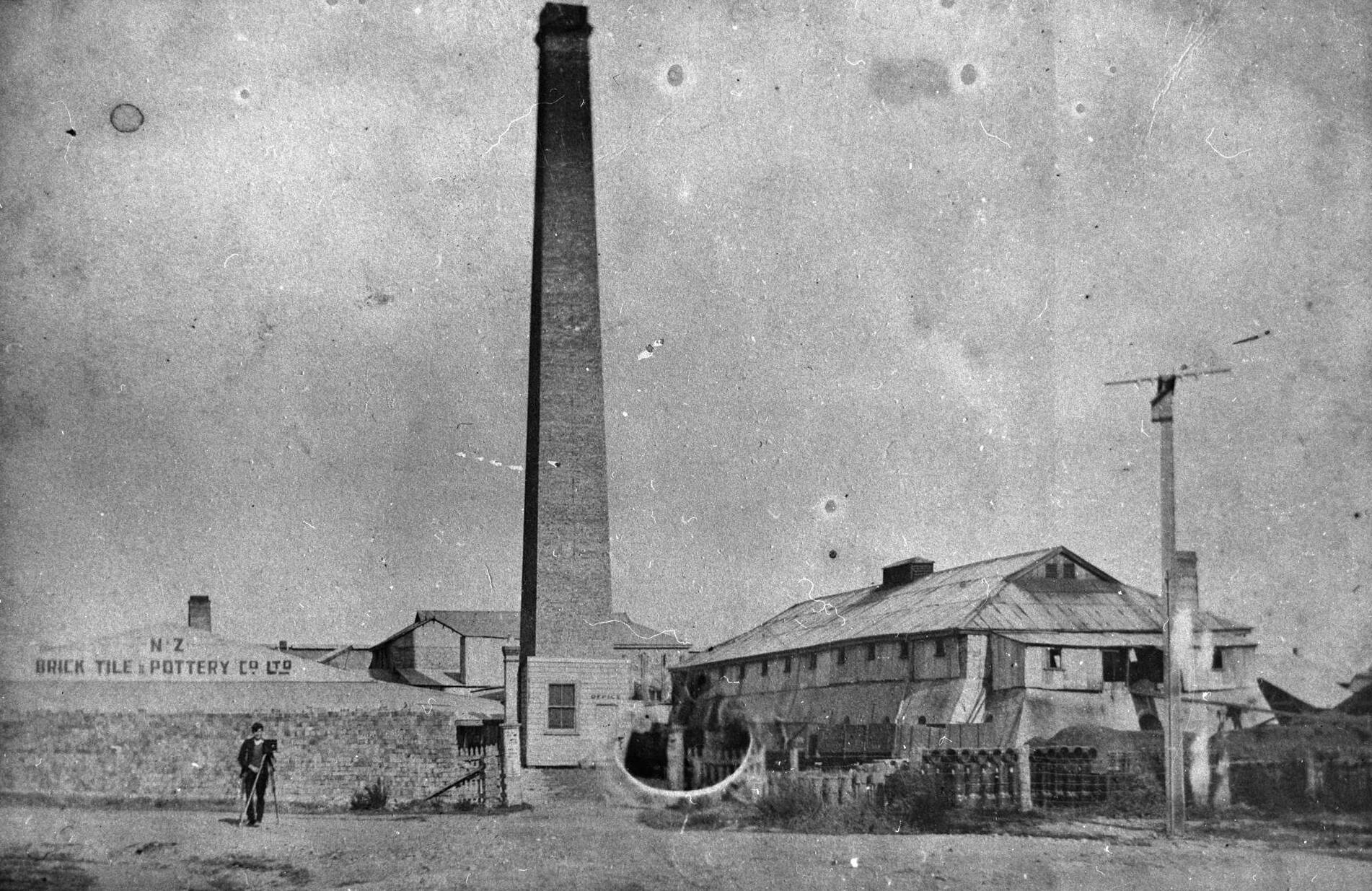
The New Zealand Brick, Tile & Pottery Company's kiln pictured in 1915

In the early 1900s, a group of citizens led by Archibald Grandison lobbied the Waitemata County for New Lynn to become an independent town district. Grandison and his supporters felt that New Lynn would grow as an outer city suburb of Auckland in the future, and had very different needs to the majority of the rural communities in the county. The population grew five times between 1900 and 1910, and in August of the following year, New Lynn became a town district. By 1 April 1919 it had grown enough to become a borough, allowing the council to take out larger loans to invest in the infrastructure of the area. Many of the street names in New Lynn are named for commissioners of the town and borough, as well as indigenous tree species. During the early 20th century, a significant Scottish immigrant population moved to New Lynn.

The Astley Tannery, which first opened in 1888, became one of the largest employers in New Lynn during World War I when demand for leather goods significantly increased. The business was greatly successful in the 1930s, closing in the 1990s. Industrial waste from the tannery and neighbouring abattoir was discharged directly into the Whau River, becoming a major source of pollution for the waterway.

In 1925, Rice Owen Clark moved his large clay pipeworks factory from Hobsonville to New Lynn. Due to the pressures of the Great Depression, the various brick and ceramics businesses of West Auckland merged to form the Amalgamated Brick and Pipe Company in 1929, who focused operations at New Lynn. The company were able to produce up to 30,000 red facing bricks per fortnight at their Ambrico kiln. The brickworks was known for its 46-metre-high chimney in central New Lynn.

In 1926, the Delta Theatre opened in New Lynn, becoming a focal point of the community, holding a range of events including film showings, live entertainment and dances. The theatre was demolished 1986. A new bridge crossing the Whau River was completed in December 1931, replacing the older wooden structures on Great North Road. The bridge was a point of contention between the New Lynn borough council and the Waitemata County and Auckland City, who wanted a bridge of a significantly smaller size to what the borough council proposed. By 1935, the population of New Lynn had grown to 3,500.

=== Crown Lynn and LynnMall ===
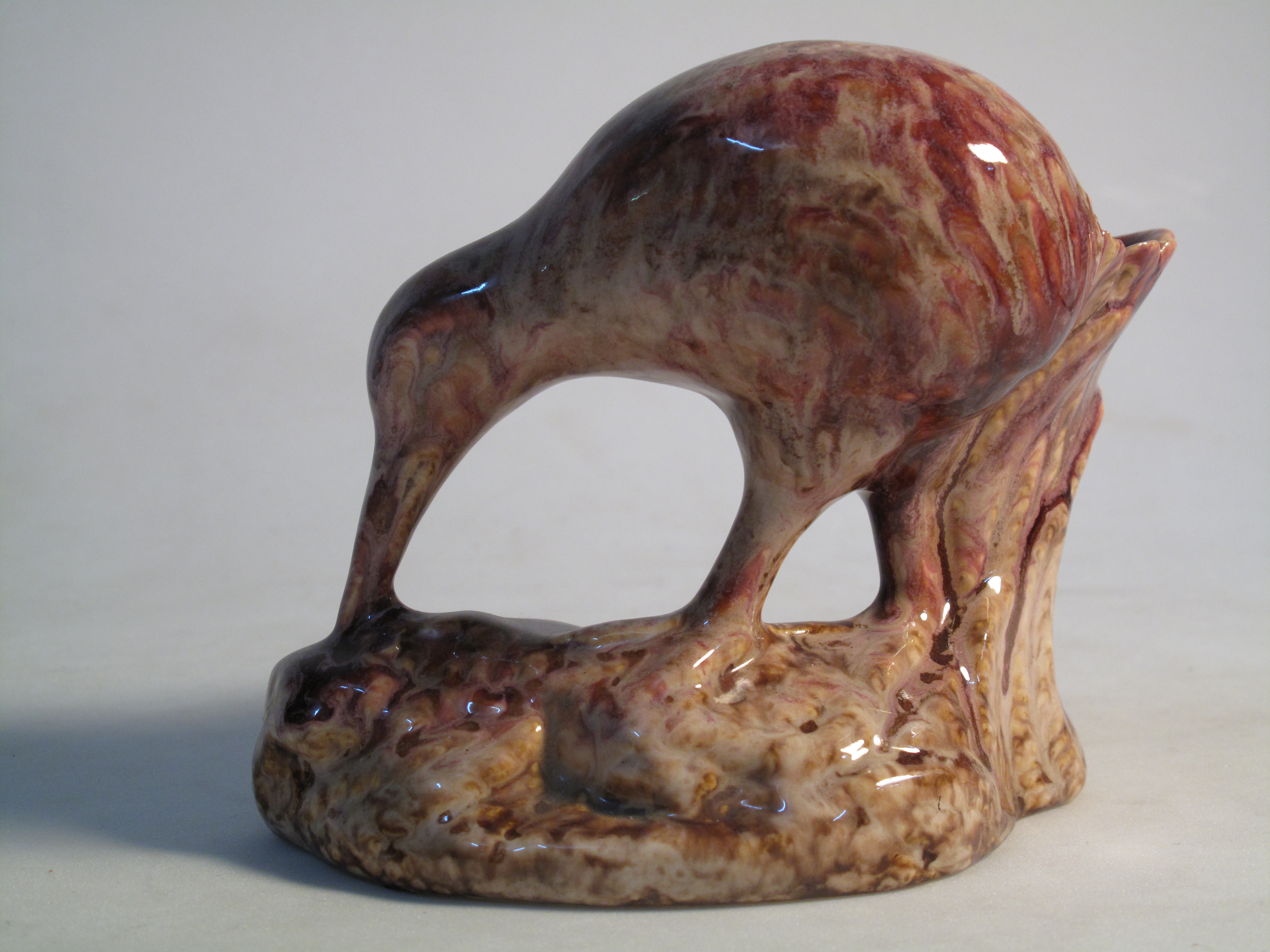
Crown Lynn was a major producer of ceramic goods in New Zealand in the 1960s

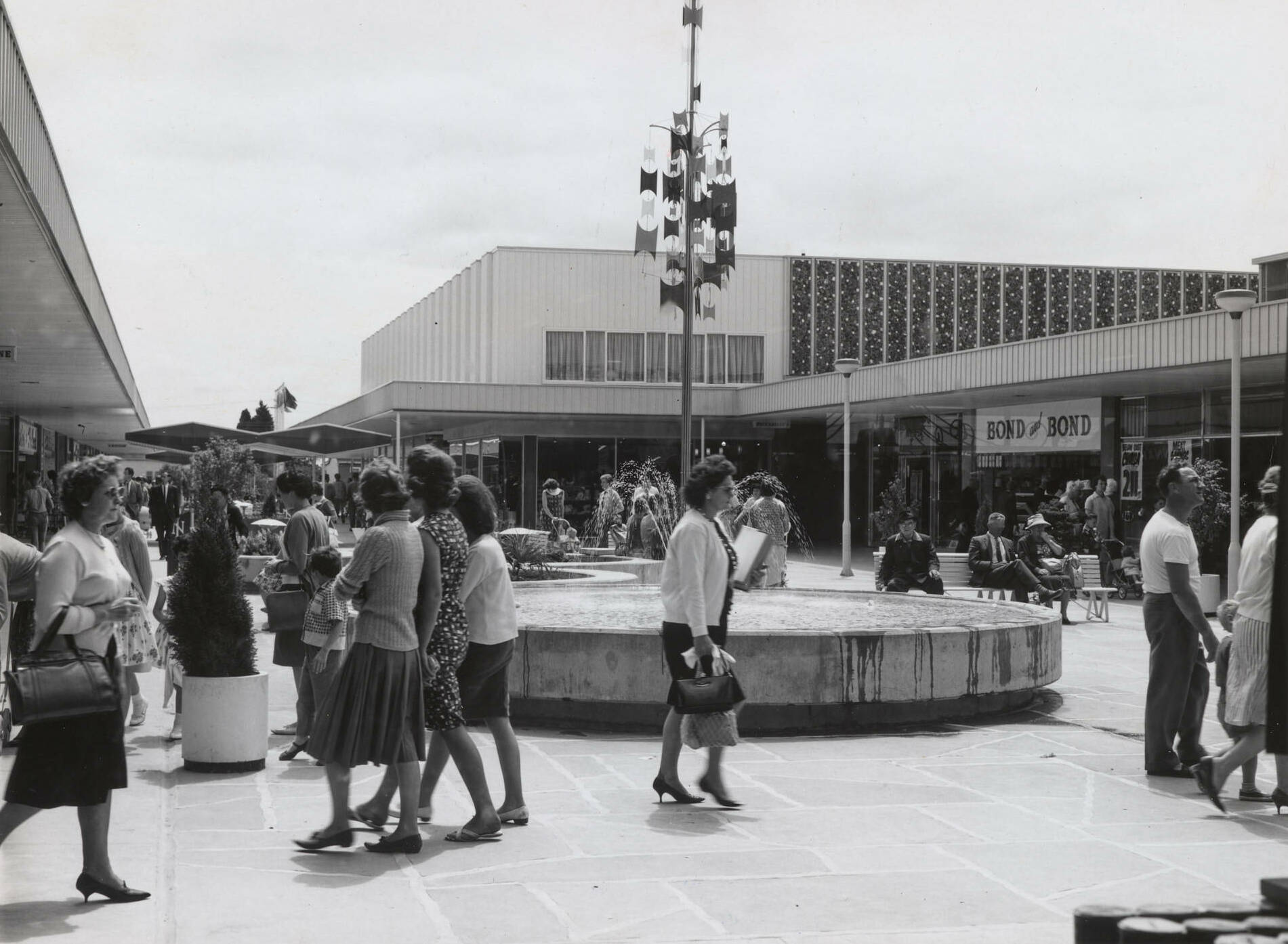
Shoppers at the newly opened LynnMall in 1963

During World War II, New Lynn was considered a vulnerable area by the government, due to the brickworks and its proximity to the border of Auckland City. Because of this, concrete machine gun posts and barbed wire were installed along the railway between Portage Road and St Georges Road, tank traps were built in the area, and air raid shelters were built at the corner of Margan and Seabrooke Avenues. Due to restrictions on the importation of British goods during the war, the Amalgamated Brick and Pottery began mass-producing crockery for the New Zealand market, growing to become one of the largest brick and ceramics companies in the Southern Hemisphere, known for their Crown Lynn pottery range. The ceramics industry led to widescale immigration of Pasifika New Zealanders to the area during the 1960s and 1970s, many of whom were employed at the Crown Lynn Potteries factories.

The port of New Lynn closed for commercial operations in 1948, when a final shipment of bricks and mānuka were transported from the port on the Rahiri.

In 1963, LynnMall, the first modern American-style shopping centre in New Zealand was opened in New Lynn. It immediately became a retail hub for Auckland, and influenced the nearby Henderson borough to create a similar mall, the Henderson Square (now known as WestCity Waitakere). In September 1974, New Zealand's first Pizza Hut restaurant opened in New Lynn.

In 1978, a new bridge across the Whau River was built along Rata Street, acting as a bypass to divert traffic away from New Lynn and Great North Road. On 17 July 1981, the Jack McCorquindale Community Centre opened in New Lynn, named after a former borough mayor.

In 1989, the Amalgamated Brick and Pipe Company (then known as Ceramco) closed down operations. In the same year, New Lynn ceased being an independent borough, merging with other local governments of West Auckland in the local body reforms of 1989 to become a part of the Waitakere City.

=== Urban development ===
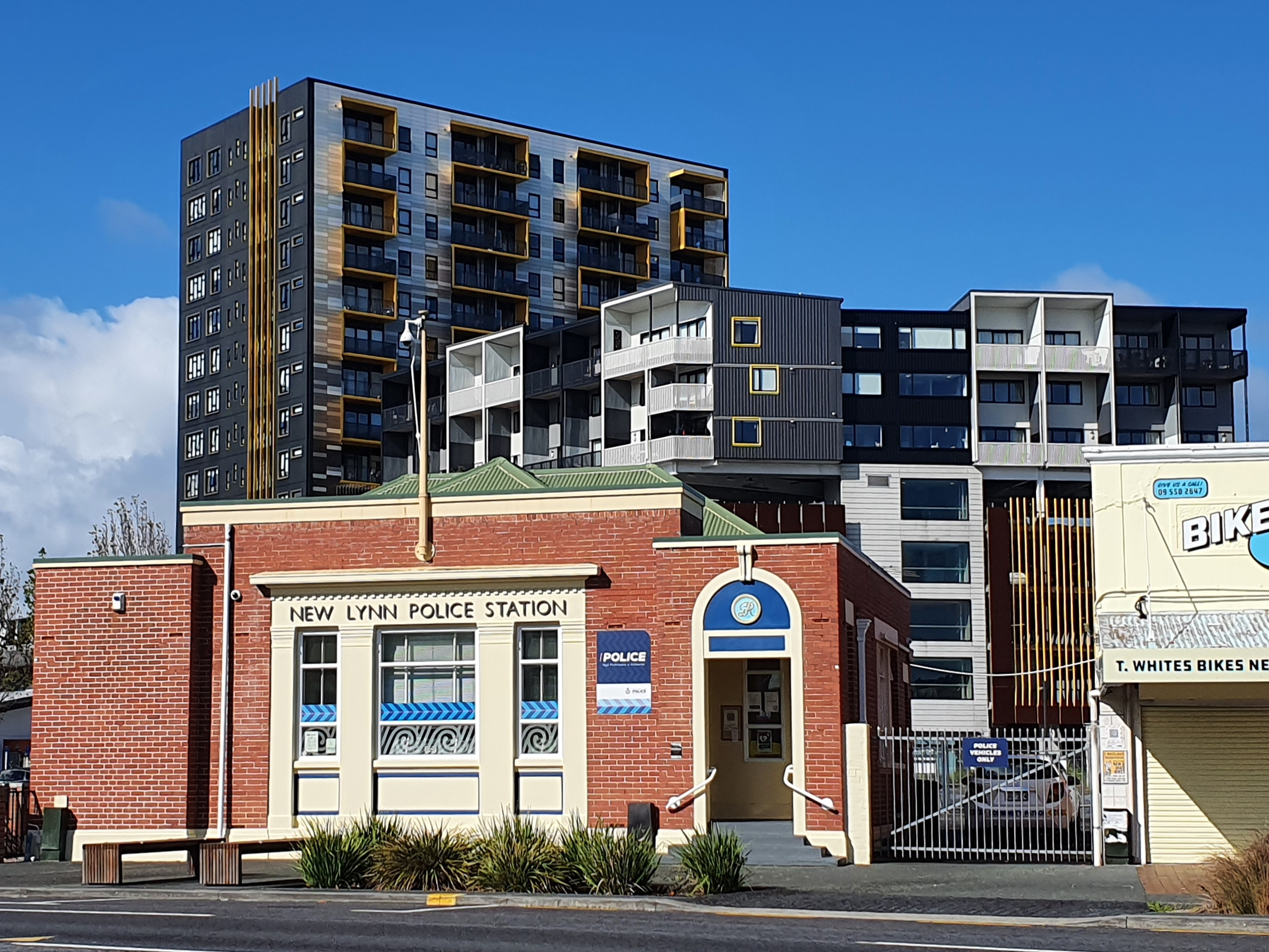
The 1930s brick New Lynn Police Station (formerly the Post Office), with the Merchant Quarter Apartments (constructed in 2015) in the background

In 2010, the New Lynn railway station was redeveloped as a transport hub, with a new station constructed and the existing tracks moved into an underground trench. This was the start of an urban revitalisation project for New Lynn, where the New Lynn town centre was redeveloped as a commercial centre and mid to high density residential hub. The first stage of the Merchant Quarter, immediately adjacent to the train station, was completed in 2013, and the Merchant Quarter Apartments, one of the tallest buildings in West Auckland, was opened in 2015. As of 2020, New Lynn is the major commercial centre of the Whau local board area, and one of the major commercial hubs of West Auckland.

Te Toi Uku: Crown Lynn Clayworks Museum opened in May 2015.

On 3 September 2021, seven people were injured in a stabbing attack at the Countdown supermarket in LynnMall.

== Demographics ==
New Lynn covers 6.36 km^{2} (2.46 sq mi) and had an estimated population of 23,800 as of June 2025, with a population density of 3,742 people per km^{2}.

Historical population
Year	Pop.	±% p.a.
2006	17,268	—
2013	18,231	+0.78%
2018	20,214	+2.09%
2023	20,877	+0.65%

New Lynn had a population of 20,877 in the 2023 New Zealand census, an increase of 663 people (3.3%) since the 2018 census, and an increase of 2,646 people (14.5%) since the 2013 census. There were 10,329 males, 10,452 females and 93 people of other genders in 7,428 dwellings. 4.0% of people identified as LGBTIQ+. The median age was 35.6 years (compared with 38.1 years nationally). There were 3,945 people (18.9%) aged under 15 years, 4,101 (19.6%) aged 15 to 29, 10,332 (49.5%) aged 30 to 64, and 2,496 (12.0%) aged 65 or older.

People could identify as more than one ethnicity. The results were 37.5% European (Pākehā); 11.6% Māori; 17.7% Pasifika; 43.5% Asian; 3.7% Middle Eastern, Latin American and African New Zealanders (MELAA); and 1.4% other, which includes people giving their ethnicity as "New Zealander". English was spoken by 90.2%, Māori language by 2.5%, Samoan by 5.5%, and other languages by 34.7%. No language could be spoken by 2.8% (e.g. too young to talk). New Zealand Sign Language was known by 0.6%. The percentage of people born overseas was 48.6, compared with 28.8% nationally.

Religious affiliations were 32.4% Christian, 11.3% Hindu, 5.3% Islam, 0.8% Māori religious beliefs, 2.4% Buddhist, 0.3% New Age, 0.1% Jewish, and 2.6% other religions. People who answered that they had no religion were 38.7%, and 6.1% of people did not answer the census question.

Of those at least 15 years old, 5,469 (32.3%) people had a bachelor's or higher degree, 6,549 (38.7%) had a post-high school certificate or diploma, and 4,911 (29.0%) people exclusively held high school qualifications. The median income was $42,000, compared with $41,500 nationally. 1,605 people (9.5%) earned over $100,000 compared to 12.1% nationally. The employment status of those at least 15 was that 9,126 (53.9%) people were employed full-time, 1,818 (10.7%) were part-time, and 690 (4.1%) were unemployed.

Individual statistical areas
Name	Area (km^{2})	Population	Density (per km^{2})	Dwellings	Median age	Median income
New Lynn North	0.74	3,162	4,273	1,059	35.4 years	$40,100
New Lynn North West	0.69	3,219	4,665	1,167	35.6 years	$41,400
Fruitvale	0.85	3,087	3,632	1,086	35.6 years	$44,000
New Lynn Central	1.18	498	422	234	37.3 years	$43,100
New Lynn Seabrook	0.72	2,931	4,071	1,041	35.3 years	$40,400
New Lynn Central South	0.74	3,312	4,476	1,239	36.5 years	$38,400
New Lynn South	0.64	2,640	4,125	882	35.7 years	$45,800
New Lynn South East	0.79	2,028	2,567	717	34.9 years	$46,300
New Zealand					38.1 years	$41,500

== Landmarks and features ==
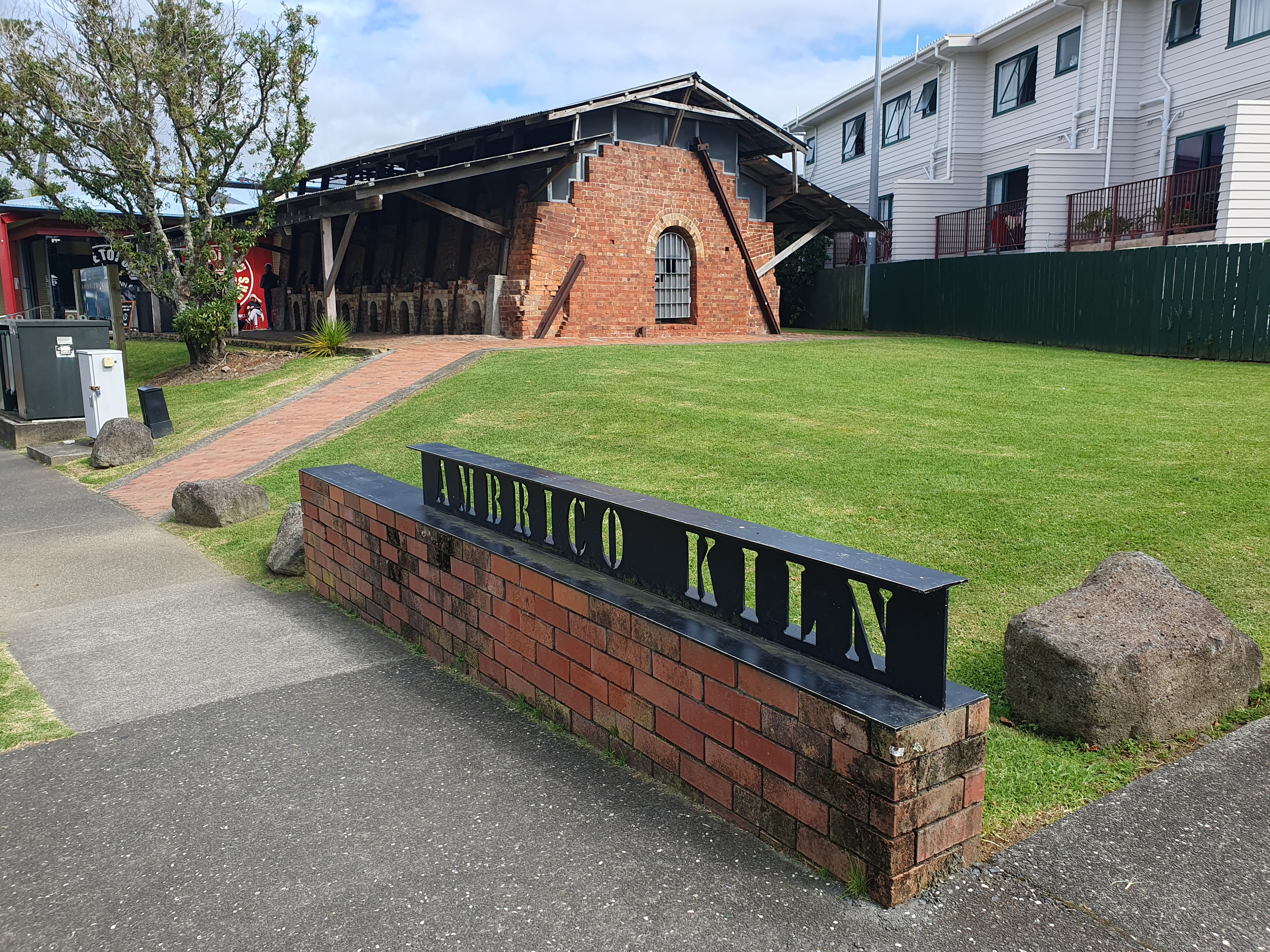
Ambrico kiln at Te Toi Uku – Crown Lynn & Clayworks Museum

- Ken Maunder Park, sportsground and home of Lynn-Avon United A.F.C. the Suburbs New Lynn Cricket Club.
- Lawson Park, sportsground and home to the New Lynn Stags rugby league club.
- LynnMall, the first American-style shopping centre in New Zealand, which opened in 1963.
- Manawa Wetland, an artificial wetland created at the site of a former clay quarry.
- New Lynn Community Centre, built in June 2001. The community centre incorporates artworks including Palisade Signals by Neil Miller, Signal-Echo by Paul Hartigan, and Brick by Peter Lange.
- New Lynn War Memorial Library and Memorial Square. Originally opening in 1957, followed by a World War I memorial cenotaph in 1958. Memorial Square was redeveloped in 1998 by landscape architect Megan Wraight, with waka-inspired sculptures by Te Kawerau ā Maki carvers Sunnah Thompson and Rewi Spraggon added to the square in 2000.
- Olympic Park. Established in 1918 as New Lynn Domain and renamed as Olympic Park in 1950, the park is home to Bay Olympic association football club, Waitakere Gymnastics and EcoMatters. The park was extensively redeveloped in 2007, winning New Zealand Recreation Association's Outstanding Park Award. During redevelopment, a sculpture trail was created, featuring artworks by Peter Nicholls, Nigel Scanlon, Te Kawerau ā Maki carvers John Collins and Sunnah Thompson among others, as well as the Wai Tahurangi Bridge across the Avondale Stream.
- Ratanadipa Buddhist Temple, a Burmese Buddhist temple.
- Rewarewa Creek Footbridge, a bridge across the Rewarewa Creek designed by Virginia King in 1997.
- Te Toi Uku – Crown Lynn & Clayworks Museum, museum for the New Lynn brickworks and ceramics industry which opened in 2015.

== Local government ==
From 1876 until 1929, New Lynn was administered by the Waitemata County, a large rural county north and west of the city of Auckland. In 1910 New Lynn became a town district and by 1929, the district split from the county, forming the New Lynn Borough Council. Upon formation the borough annexed part of Waitemata County. Between 1929 and 1989, 78 councillors (also known as commissioners) served on the borough council. In 1989, the borough was merged into the Waitakere City. Waitakere City Council was amalgamated into Auckland Council in November 2010.

Within the Auckland Council, New Lynn is a part of the Whau local government area governed by the Whau Local Board. It is a part of the Whau ward, which elects one councillor to the Auckland Council.

=== Mayors of New Lynn Borough ===
Between 1929 and 1989, eight people held the position of Mayor of New Lynn Borough. The longest standing mayor of the borough was Stanley William Rickards, who held the position for 14 years.

	Name	Term
1	Charles Gardner	1929–1931
2	George Lawson	1931–1938
3	Tony Reimann	1938–1941
4	Stan Rickards	1941–1955
5	Hugh Brown	1955–1959
6	Sam Noall	1959–1965
7	Jack McCorquindale	1965–1974
(5)	Hugh Brown	1974–1977
(7)	Jack McCorquindale	1977–1980
8	Bruce McNaughton	1980–1989

== Transport ==
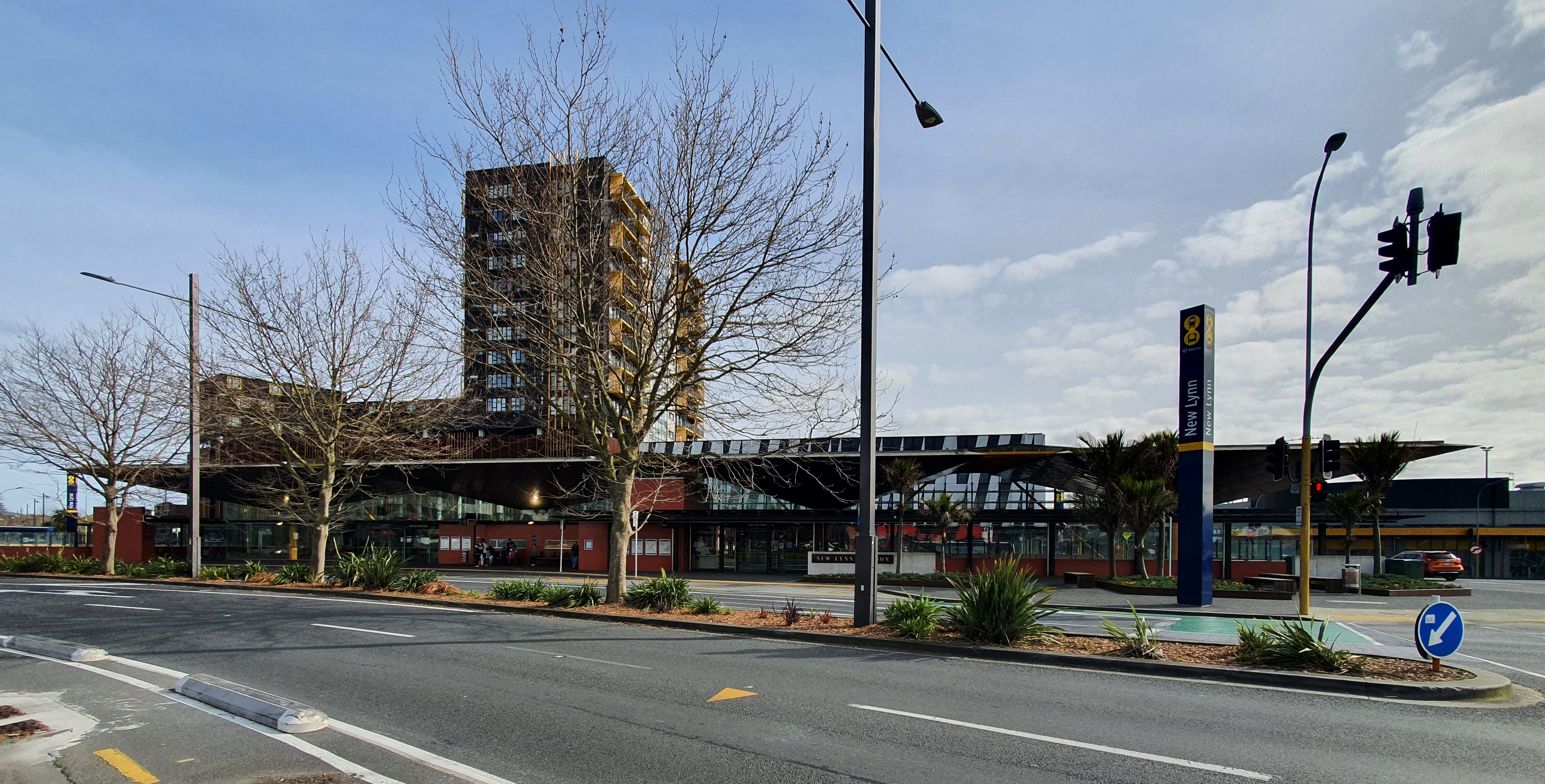
New Lynn Railway Station in 2022

New Lynn Railway Station, located next to the bus transport centre and the LynnMall shopping centre, was upgraded in 2008–2010 to cater for the increased frequency of trains expected on the Auckland regional network after its electrification. The section of track on the Western line between Portage Road and Titirangi Road was trenched to allow trains to pass beneath the New Lynn town centre. A twin-platform station was built below road level near the site of the existing station. As part of the redevelopment projects for the area, part of Totara Avenue, in the New Lynn town centre, was transformed into a shared space.

New Lynn has had ready road access to the Auckland CBD since the Northwestern Motorway and an expressway through Waterview were completed in the late 1970s.

The New Lynn to Avondale shared path, a cycle path that connects to the Auckland cycle path network, was opened in 2022.

== Education ==
Arahoe School, Fruitvale Road School and New Lynn School are coeducational contributing primary (years 1–6) schools with rolls of 415, 350 and 513 respectively. New Lynn School opened in 1888, Arahoe School opened in 1958. Fruitvale Road School opened in 1962, however has its origins in the Fruitvale School, which opened in the late 19th century at the current site of the Fruitvale Community Hall.

Oaklynn Special School is a coeducational school with a roll of 228. It is a special school for students with intellectual impairments. The school runs ten satellite classes at nearby primary, intermediate and secondary schools.

New Lynn has no secondary schools but is serviced by large school campuses in surrounding suburbs, including Kelston Boys' High School, Kelston Girls' College, Avondale College (co-ed), and Green Bay High School (co-ed).

== Bibliography ==
- Buffett, Peter (1989). New Lynn Jubilee 1929-1989: The History of New Lynn. New Lynn Borough Council.
- Diamond, John T. (1992). "The Brick and Pottery Industry in the Western Districts". In Northcote-Bade, James (ed.). West Auckland Remembers. Vol. 2. West Auckland Historical Society. ISBN 0-473-01587-0.
- Diamond, John T.; Hayward, Bruce W. (1979). The Māori history and legends of the Waitākere Ranges. The Lodestar Press. ISBN 9781877431210.
- Dickey, Hugh (2020). Whau Now, Whau Then. Blockhouse Bay Historical Society. ISBN 978-0-473-54013-5.
- Donaghey, Sara (2009). "Remains of the Day". In Macdonald, Finlay; Kerr, Ruth (eds.). West: The History of Waitakere. Random House. pp. 433–452. ISBN 9781869790080.
- Hart, Stephen, ed. (2008). Where to Live in Auckland. Barbican Publishing. ISBN 978-0-473-14244-5.
- Mason, Robyn (2009). "Fire in the West". In Macdonald, Finlay; Kerr, Ruth (eds.). West: The History of Waitakere. Random House. pp. 217–236. ISBN 9781869790080.
- Moon, Paul (2009). "Taking Care of Business". In Macdonald, Finlay; Kerr, Ruth (eds.). West: The History of Waitakere. Random House. pp. 119–140. ISBN 9781869790080.
- Murdoch, Graeme (2006). "Te Wao Nui a Tiriwa - The Great Forest of Tiriwa". In Harvey, Bruce; Harvey, Trixie (eds.). Waitakere Ranges: Ranges of Inspiration, Nature, History, Culture. Waitakere Ranges Protection Society. pp. 19–35. ISBN 978-0-476-00520-4.
- Reidy, Jade (2009). "How the West Was Run". In Macdonald, Finlay; Kerr, Ruth (eds.). West: The History of Waitakere. Random House. ISBN 9781869790080.
- Ringer Monk, Valerie (2006). Crown Lynn, A New Zealand Icon. New Zealand: Penguin Group. p. 11. ISBN 0143020633.
- Skelton, Carolyn (2016). A Brief History of New Lynn: A West Auckland suburb. Whau Local Board.
- Stone, R. C. J. (2001). From Tamaki-makau-rau to Auckland. Auckland University Press. ISBN 1869402596.
