= 2025 Christchurch mayoral election =

- 11 October 2025
- Turnout: 107,475 (38.30% ▼6.06 pp)
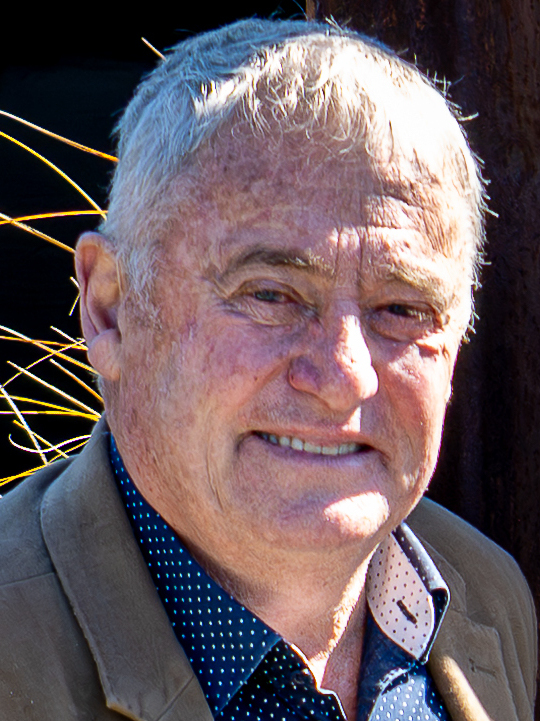

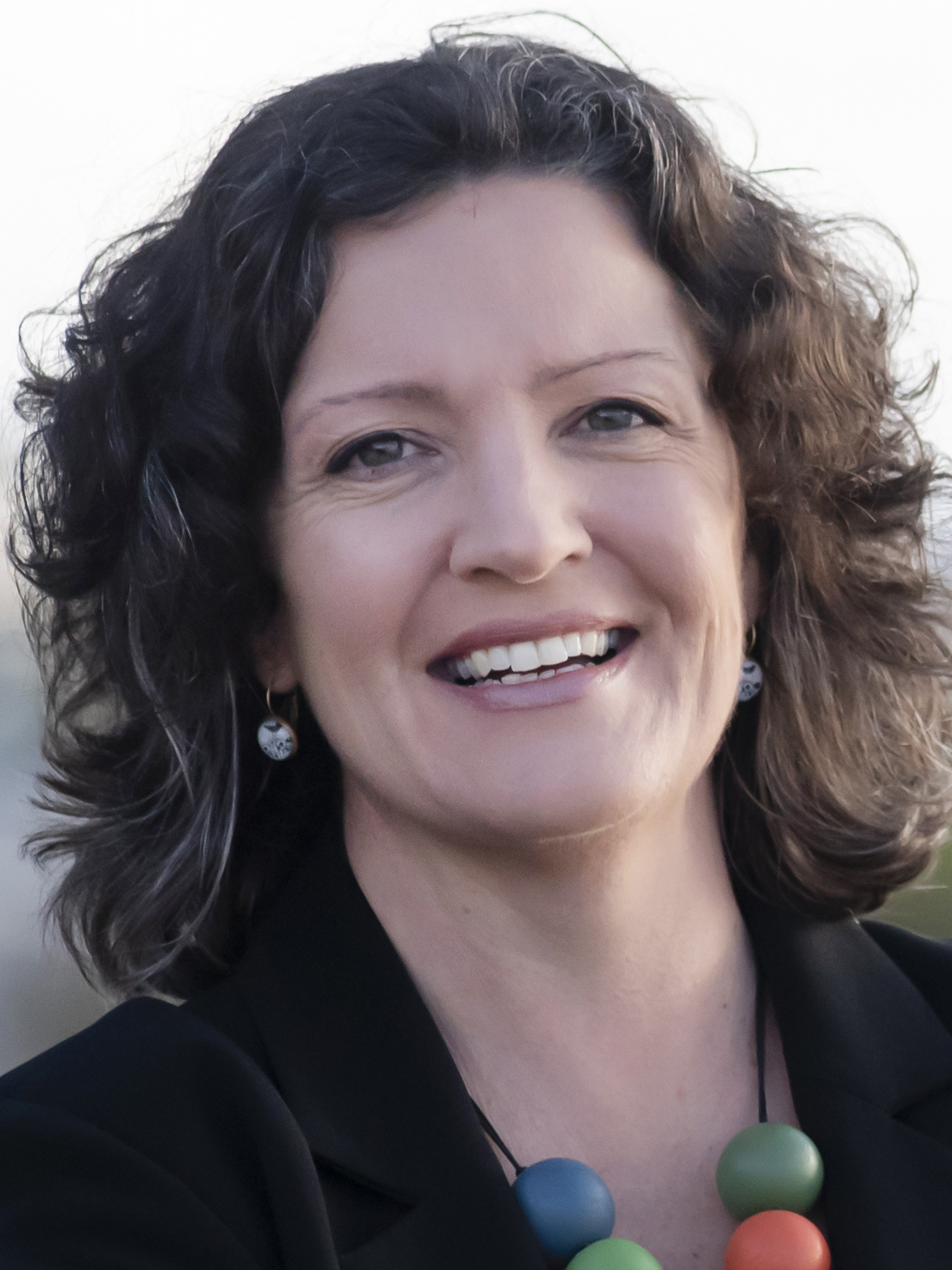
| Candidate | Phil Mauger | Sara Templeton |
| Party | Independent | Independent |
| Popular vote | 60,137 | 40,533 |
| Percentage | 55.95% | 37.71% |
Mayor before election
Phil Mauger
Independent
Elected mayor
Phil Mauger
Independent

The 2025 Christchurch mayoral election was a local election held from 9 September to 11 October in Christchurch, New Zealand, as part of that year's city council election and nation-wide local elections. Voters elected the mayor of Christchurch for the 2025–2028 term. Postal voting and the first-past-the-post voting system were used. Incumbent centre-right independent mayor Phil Mauger ran for a second term, with incumbent centre-left independent councillor Sara Templeton as his main challenger; there were six other candidates for the position.

Mauger defeated Templeton and was re-elected.

== Key dates ==
The timeline of electoral events were:

- Friday, 4 July – Candidate nominations open, roll opens for public inspection
- Friday, 1 August – Nominations close at midday, electoral roll closes
- Friday, 8 August – Candidates announced
- Tuesday, 9 September – Ballots posted out, voting opens
- Saturday, 11 October – Voting closes at midday
- Sunday, 19 October – Final results declared

== Campaign ==
In October 2024, Sara Templeton was the first candidate who announced their candidacy. A city councillor since the 2016 local elections, she would not stand again in the Heathcote ward to focus on the mayoral campaign.

The second person to announce their candidacy was Phil Mauger, the incumbent mayor, in January 2025. He has been a city councillor since the 2019 local elections and mayor since the 2022 elections. Mauger had campaigned on a 4 percent rates cap in 2022, but presided over a 9.9 percent rise in the 2024–25 financial year. To lower rates rises, he proposes asset sales.

== List of candidates ==
| Candidate | Photo | Affiliation (Note: A candidate could leave their affiliation blank, run as an independent, or run with an affiliation to an organisation, local body ticket or political party. Christchurch City Council did not allow whānau, hapū, or iwi details to be used for the affiliation.) | Notes |
|---|---|---|---|
| Blair Anderson | | None | Has run for council five times. Previously ran for the mayoralty in 2019. |
| Philip Arps | | Independant Nationalist New Zealand | White supremacist who was convicted for sharing footage of the Christchurch mosque shootings. |
| Tubby Hansen | | Economic Euthenics | Perennial candidate since 1969. Also ran as a councillor in the Spreydon ward. |
| Thomas Healey | | Independent | |
| Phil Mauger | | Let's Get More Stuff Done | Incumbent mayor since 2022 |
| Nikora Nitro | | Independent | Former member of the Mana Party. Criminally convicted in 2012 for soliciting sex from a teenager. Previously ran for the mayoralty in 2022. |
| Sara Templeton | | Our City. Our People. Our Future. | Councillor for the Heathcote ward since 2016 |
| Peter Wakeman | | Independent | Retired businessman. Standing for the mayoralty for the seventh time. Also ran for the Auckland mayoralty. |

== Result ==
Mauger won the election by a large margin, with Templeton coming second.

2025 Christchurch mayoral election
| Party | Candidate | Votes | % | ±% |
|---|---|---|---|---|
| Independent | Phil Mauger^{†} | 60,137 | 55.95 | +11.39 |
| Independent | Sara Templeton | 40,533 | 37.71 | (new) |
| Independent | Thomas Healey | 1,714 | 1.59 | (new) |
| Independent | Nikora Nitro | 1,525 | 1.42 | +0.56 |
| Independent | Blair Anderson | 1,327 | 1.23 | (new) |
| Independent | Phil Arps | 448 | 0.42 | (new) |
| Independent | Tubby Hansen | 354 | 0.33 | +0.09 |
| Independent | P Wakeman | 320 | 0.30 | −0.50 |
| Informal votes | | 105 | 0.10 | +0.02 |
| Blank votes | | 1,008 | 0.94 | +0.16 |
| Turnout | | 107,475 | 38.30 | −6.06 |
| Registered electors | | 280,587 | | |
| Independent hold | | | | |
^{†} incumbent
