= 1995 Auckland City Council election =

Local election in New Zealand

- 14 October 1995

All 24 seats on the Auckland City Council

	First party	Second party	Third party
Party	Citizens & Ratepayers	Alliance	Labour
Last election	17	5	1
Seats won	17	2	2
Seat change	0	▼3	▲1

The 1995 Auckland City Council election was part of the 1995 New Zealand local elections, to elect members to sub-national councils and boards. The polling was conducted using the first-past-the-post electoral method.

== Council ==
The Auckland City Council consisted of a mayor and twenty-four councillors elected from ten wards (Avondale, Eastern Bays, Hauraki Gulf Islands, Hobson, Maungakiekie, Mount Albert, Mount Eden, Mount Roskill, Tamaki and Western Bays).

=== Mayor ===
1995 Auckland mayoral election
Party	Candidate	Votes	%	±%
Independent	Les Mills	53,411	50.96	−10.58
Independent	Pam Corkery	43,748	41.74	
Independent	Robert Rakete	1,758	1.67	
Independent	Sue Henry	1,451	1.38	
Christians Against Abortion	Phil O'Connor	1,450	1.38	
Independent	Steven John Atwood	1,126	1.07	
Blokes Liberation Front	Chris Brady	496	0.47	
McGillicuddy Serious	Marc de Boer	479	0.45	
Independent	Victor Bryers	407	0.38	
STD Party	Laurence Watkins	277	0.26	+0.02
Communist League	James Robb	186	0.17	
Majority		9,663	9.21	−0.13
Turnout		104,806	49.50	

==== Avondale Ward ====
The Avondale Ward elects two members to the Auckland City Council

Avondale Ward
Party	Candidate	Votes	%	±%
Citizens & Ratepayers	Brian Maude	3,607	38.52	+1.40
Independent	Phil Raffills	2,665	28.46	
Citizens & Ratepayers	Jim Gilbert	2,368	25.29	−9.98
Labour	Lorraine Wilson	1,785	19.06	
Independent	Graeme Dabb	1,739	18.57	
Alliance	Jack Henderson	1,666	17.79	
Independent	Veronica Egan	1,654	17.66	−16.75
Labour	Ian Dunwoodie	1,631	17.42	
Alliance	Robert Neville	1,610	17.19	
Majority		297	3.17	
Turnout		9,362		

==== Eastern Bays Ward ====
The Eastern Bays Ward elects three members to the Auckland City Council

Eastern Bays Ward
Party	Candidate	Votes	%	±%
Citizens & Ratepayers	Juliet Yates	12,051	89.61	+15.02
Citizens & Ratepayers	Gray Bartlett	10,858	80.74	+9.76
Citizens & Ratepayers	Colin Davis	8,548	63.56	
Independent	Gordon Wilmot Ragg	5,545	41.23	
Alliance	Doug Ogle	3,340	24.83	
Majority		3,003	22.33	
Turnout		13,448		

==== Hauraki Gulf Islands Ward ====
The Hauraki Gulf Islands Ward elects one member to the Auckland City Council

Hauraki Gulf Islands Ward
Party	Candidate	Votes	%	±%
Independent	Greg Davenport	1,336	45.75	+16.46
Independent	Judy Voullaire	890	30.47	
Labour	Dave Robinson	372	12.73	
Green	Bruce Bisset	322	11.02	
Majority		446	15.27	
Turnout		2,920		

==== Hobson Ward ====
The Hobson Ward elects two members to the Auckland City Council

Hobson Ward
Party	Candidate	Votes	%	±%
Citizens & Ratepayers	Barbara Goodman	6,043	57.30	−20.72
Citizens & Ratepayers	John Strevens	5,104	48.39	−16.29
Independent	Hamish Keith	3,183	30.18	
Independent	Ron Wright	2,675	25.36	
Independent	Chris Cotton	2,085	19.77	
Independent	Tim Mahon	1,140	10.80	
Independent	Peter Buchanan	862	8.17	
Majority		1,921	18.21	
Turnout		10,546		

==== Maungakiekie Ward ====
The Maungakiekie Ward elects three members to the Auckland City Council

Maungakiekie Ward
Party	Candidate	Votes	%	±%
Citizens & Ratepayers	Ken Graham	6,111	60.17	−8.49
Citizens & Ratepayers	Catherine Harland	5,674	55.86	
Citizens & Ratepayers	John Williams	5,549	54.63	−5.75
Alliance	Dawn Patchett	2,675	26.33	
Alliance	Petronella Townsend	2,375	23.38	
Independent	Mahe Tupouniua	2,005	19.74	−28.82
Alliance	John-Soane Foliaki	1,835	18.06	
Labour	Stephen Hurring	1,566	15.41	
Labour	Peter Donald Haynes	1,460	14.37	
Labour	Mark Wilkins	1,217	11.98	
Majority		2,874	28.29	
Turnout		10,156		

==== Mount Albert Ward ====
The Mount Albert Ward elects two members to the Auckland City Council

Mount Albert Ward
Party	Candidate	Votes	%	±%
Citizens & Ratepayers	Frank Ryan	3,890	44.25	−8.69
Citizens & Ratepayers	Patricia Goddard	2,589	29.45	
Alliance	Jennie Walker	2,454	27.92	−15.75
Alliance	Gillian Dance	2,203	25.06	
Labour	Devon Diggle	1,855	21.10	
Independent	Elizabeth Anderson	1,793	20.40	
Labour	Syd Walker	1,504	17.11	
Independent	Donna McCartney	1,290	14.67	
Majority		135	1.53	
Turnout		8,789		

==== Mount Eden Ward ====
The Mount Eden Ward elects two members to the Auckland City Council

Mount Eden Ward
Party	Candidate	Votes	%	±%
Citizens & Ratepayers	Astrid Malcolm	5,107	66.33	+6.60
Citizens & Ratepayers	Gordon Johns	4,947	64.25	+10.74
Alliance	Susan Bulmer	2,925	37.99	
Alliance	Vivien Rickard	2,419	31.41	
Majority		2,022	26.26	
Turnout		7,699		

==== Mount Roskill Ward ====
The Mount Roskill Ward elects two members to the Auckland City Council

Mount Roskill Ward
Party	Candidate	Votes	%	±%
Citizens & Ratepayers	David Hay	8,138	68.86	+2.11
Citizens & Ratepayers	Doug Astley	7,977	67.49	+14.35
Citizens & Ratepayers	Grahame Breed	7,445	62.99	+14.88
Alliance	Chris Anderton	4,107	34.75	
Alliance	Rex Stanton	4,056	34.32	
Alliance	Mark Allen	3,731	31.57	
Majority		3,338	28.24	
Turnout		11,818		

==== Tamaki Ward ====
The Tamaki Ward elects three members to the Auckland City Council

Tamaki Ward
Party	Candidate	Votes	%	±%
Independent	Bill Christian	4,418	49.35	+5.34
Labour	Ian Shaw	3,994	44.62	+6.33
Labour	Jan Welch	3,846	42.96	
Alliance	Trevor Barnard	3,652	40.79	−2.20
Labour	Carol Gosche	3,349	37.41	
Alliance	Desne Charmaine Harris	3,268	36.50	
Alliance	Christopher Henry Mason	2,956	33.02	
Independent	Selwyn Abaford	1,370	15.30	
Majority		194	2.16	
Turnout		8,951		

==== Western Bays Ward ====
The Western Bays Ward elects three members to the Auckland City Council

Western Bays Ward
Party	Candidate	Votes	%	±%
Alliance	Bruce Hucker	6,176	56.00	−15.43
Citizens & Ratepayers	Penny Whiting	6,110	55.40	+7.30
Alliance	Penny Sefuvia	5,148	46.68	
Alliance	Sue Corbett	5,136	46.57	−18.55
Citizens & Ratepayers	Gary Gotlieb	4,584	41.57	
Independent	Stephen James Boyle	2,877	26.09	
Independent	Jo Crowley	1,948	17.66	
Independent	Brian Ian Kirby	1,101	9.98	
Majority		12	0.10	
Turnout		11,027		

=== Auckland Regional Council ===
==== Auckland Isthmus Ward ====
The Auckland Isthmus Ward elects four members to the Auckland Regional Council

Auckland Isthmus Ward
Party	Candidate	Votes	%	±%
Citizens & Ratepayers	Phil Warren	50,835	62.11	
Citizens & Ratepayers	Patricia Thorp	49,524	60.51	
Citizens & Ratepayers	Selwyn Bartlett	42,477	51.90	
Citizens & Ratepayers	Ron Greer	41,784	51.05	
Alliance	Maire Leadbeater	34,886	42.62	
Alliance	Chris Harris	29,860	36.48	
Alliance	Mike Lee	29,330	35.83	
Alliance	Jan Riddick	28,748	35.12	
Independent	Jack McCormick	19,918	24.33	
Majority		6,898	8.42	
Turnout		81,841		
