= 2025 Auckland mayoral election =

New Zealand municipal election

- 11 October 2025
- Turnout: 341,976 (28.36% ▼7.05 pp)
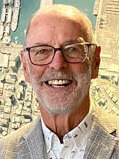

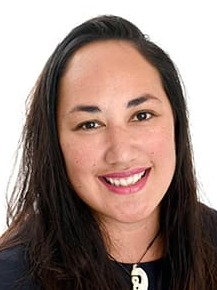

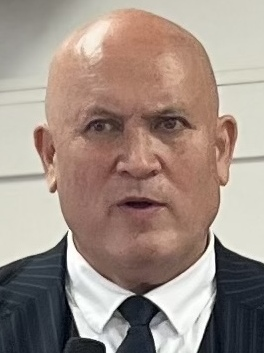
Candidate	Wayne Brown	Kerrin Leoni	Ted Johnston
Party	Fix Auckland	Independent	Independent
Popular vote	180,130	77,577	27,035
Percentage	51.44%	22.16%	7.72%
- Brown: 30–40% 40–50% 50–60% 60–70% 70–80% Leoni: 40–50%
Mayor before election
Wayne Brown
Independent
Elected mayor
Wayne Brown
Fix Auckland

The 2025 Auckland mayoral election was held from 9 September to 11 October in Auckland, New Zealand, as part of that year's council election and nation-wide local elections. Voters elected the mayor of Auckland for the 2025–2028 term. Postal voting and the first-past-the-post voting system were used. Incumbent mayor Wayne Brown was reelected to a second term.

== Key dates ==
- 4 July 2025: Nominations for candidates opened
- 1 August 2025: Nominations for candidates closed at 12 pm
- 9 September 2025: Voting documents were posted and voting opened
- 11 October 2025: Voting closed at 12 pm and progress/preliminary results will be published
- 16-19 October 2025: Final results will be declared.

== Campaign ==
On 11 September 2025, former Labour candidate and City Vision campaign manager Jeremy Greenbrook-Held endorsed incumbent Mayor Wayne Brown instead of the Labour-aligned candidate Kerrin Leoni.

== List of candidates ==
=== Declared ===
Candidate	Photo	Affiliation (Note: A candidate could leave their affiliation blank, run as an independent, or run with an affiliation to an organisation, local body ticket or political party. Auckland Council did not allow election slogans to be used for the affiliation.)	Notes
John Alcock		None	Former ACT Party board member. Mayoral candidate in the 2022 election. Also ran for council in the Maungakiekie-Tāmaki ward.
Wayne Brown		Fix Auckland	Incumbent mayor since 2022
Eric Chuah		None	Former party strategist for Peter Dunne. Also ran for council in the North Shore ward and for the Kaipātiki Local Board.
Michael Coote		Independent	Mayoral candidate in the 2022 election. Also ran for council in the Waitākere ward and for the Henderson-Massey Local Board.
Ted Johnston		Independent	Former New Conservatives Party leader, and mayoral candidate in the 2022 and 2019 elections
Kerrin Leoni		None	Incumbent Labour councillor for the Whau ward since 2022
Rob McNeil		Animal Justice Party	Executive president of Animal Justice Party Aotearoa New Zealand
Ryan Pausina		None	Mayoral candidate in the 2022 election.
Jason Pieterse		None	
Simon Stam		Independent	
Peter Wakeman		Independent	Perennial candidate. Also stood for the Christchurch mayoralty.
Denise Widdison		Independent	Also ran for the Henderson-Massey Local Board and for the Waitākere Licensing Trust

=== Declined ===
- Josephine Bartley, Maungakiekie-Tāmaki Ward Councillor (running for re-election) (endorsed Leoni)
- Paula Bennett, former Deputy Prime Minister of New Zealand, former National Party MP
- Simon Bridges, Chief Executive of the Auckland Business Chamber, former leader of the National Party, former Leader of the Opposition
- Alf Filipaina, Manukau Ward Councillor (running for re-election)
- Craig Lord, candidate for Mayor in 2019 and 2022 (running for Whau Ward Councillor)
- Richard Hills, North Shore Ward Councillor (running for re-election)
- Leo Molloy, businessman, former candidate for Mayor in 2022
- Desley Simpson, Deputy Mayor of Auckland, Ōrākei Ward Councillor (running for re-election) (endorsed Brown)
- Michael Wood, former Labour Party MP, former Minister of Transport, former Minister for Auckland

== Opinion polling ==
Date	Polling organisation	Sample size	Wayne Brown	Ted Johnston	Kerrin Leoni	Rob McNeil	Ryan Pausina	Jason Pieterse	Denise Widdison	Other
11–15 Jul 2025	Freshwater Strategy (Note: Commissioned by Wayne Brown's campaign)	1,246	65%	3%	6%	6%	3%	4%	3%	9% (Note: Peter Wakeman, Eric Chuah, Simon Stam, and John Alcock on 2%, Michael Coote on 1%)

== Results ==
Wayne Brown was re-elected as mayor for the 2025-2028 term.

2025 Auckland mayoral election
Party	Candidate	Votes	%	±%
Fix Auckland	Wayne Brown^{†}	180,130	51.44	+6.50
Independent	Kerrin Leoni	77,577	22.16	(new)
Independent	Ted Johnston	27,035	7.72	+6.52
Independent	Simon Stam	13,158	3.76	(new)
Independent	John Ronald Alcock	11,235	3.21	+1.91
Independent	Eric Boon Leong Chuah	7,323	2.09	(new)
Animal Justice	Rob McNeil	6,855	1.96	(new)
Independent	Michael Coote	6,676	1.91	+0.92
Independent	Denise Widdison	4,463	1.27	(new)
Independent	Ryan Earl Pausina	3,242	0.93	(new)
Independent	Peter Wakeman	1,976	0.56	(new)
Independent	Jason Pieterse	1,764	0.50	(new)
Informal votes		670	0.19	+0.00
Blank votes		8,049	2.30	+1.13
Turnout		350,153	29.30	−5.87
Registered electors		1,194,953		
Fix Auckland hold				
^{†} incumbent

=== By local board subdivision ===
Results by local board subdivision
Local board	Subdivision	Brown	Leoni	Other	Informal	Total
Rodney	Northern Rodney	2,074	726	1,194	10	4,004
Rodney	Southern Kaipara	1,838	864	1,354	6	4,062
Rodney	Warkworth	3,227	996	1,394	14	5,631
Rodney	Kumeū	2,255	778	1,203	7	4,243
Rodney	Dairy Flat	1,430	293	614	4	2,341
Hibiscus and Bays	Hibiscus Coast	9,916	2,505	4,722	32	17,175
Hibiscus and Bays	East Coast Bays	6,919	1,779	2,956	22	11,676
Upper Harbour		7,909	2,254	4,215	30	14,408
Kaipātiki		9,361	3,967	5,107	27	18,462
Devonport-Takapuna		9,192	2,632	3,591	28	15,443
Henderson-Massey		8,729	5,785	7,379	55	21,948
Waitākere Ranges		5,760	4,351	3,226	34	13,371
Aotea/Great Barrier		243	98	174	0	515
Waiheke		1,628	1,278	734	5	3,645
Waitematā		10,478	4,648	3,007	20	18,153
Whau		6,005	4,962	4,179	20	15,166
Albert-Eden	Ōwairaka	5,232	3,757	2,119	24	11,132
Albert-Eden	Maungawhau	6,333	2,577	2,125	19	11,054
Puketāpapa		5,704	2,480	3,365	24	11,573
Ōrākei		16,851	2,861	3,883	26	23,621
Maungakiekie-Tāmaki	Maungakiekie	3,133	1,584	1,464	9	6,190
Maungakiekie-Tāmaki	Tāmaki	3,726	2,348	2,489	16	8,579
Howick	Pakuranga	5,604	1,129	2,616	20	9,369
Howick	Howick	6,467	1,343	2,938	19	10,767
Howick	Botany	3,304	687	1,921	36	5,948
Howick	Flat Bush	2,924	1,141	2,301	24	6,390
Māngere-Ōtāhuhu		3,619	5,302	3,933	39	12,893
Ōtara-Papatoetoe	Ōtara	1,212	2,168	1,560	13	4,953
Ōtara-Papatoetoe	Papatoetoe	5,183	2,950	3,004	14	11,151
Manurewa		7,208	4,361	4,590	39	16,198
Papakura		5,073	2,464	3,331	21	10,889
Franklin	Waiuku	2,050	616	1,242	3	3,911
Franklin	Pukekohe	5,027	1,111	2,300	8	8,446
Franklin	Wairoa	4,516	782	1,546	2	6,846
Total		180,130	77,577	91,776	670	350,153
