= Yip Kue Sum =

Yip Kue Sum (1884–1967) was a Chinese-born New Zealand pioneer in viticulture.

Yip Kue Sum was born in China in 1884. She married Joe Ah Chan, who emigrated to New Zealand in around 1905, but remained in China while he established himself in New Zealand. Kue Sum went to a private tutor in her village to study English, as at the time immigrants were required to pass a literacy test of 100 English words in order to enter New Zealand. She was able to pass the test and moved to New Zealand in 1920.

Her husband had opened a general store at Matamata in the North Island, and Kue Sum ran the store together with him. Two years later, the couple moved to Thames and opened a fruit shop and market garden, and in 1924 they leased land for a vineyard and opened Goldleaf Vineyard. In 1935 they expanded to a second vineyard under the same name.

As Ah Chan was frequently away from the vineyard for months at a time, Kue Sum was responsible for leading and managing the workers who picked, wrapped and packed the grapes for transportation. She was also responsible for the security of the vineyard, as burglars frequently broke in to steal grapes from the vines. She used an Alsatian watchdog to keep watch, and a broom as her weapon.

Ah Chan was known in the local community for her generosity and hospitality. During the Depression she gave work to some of the many desperate people who came to the vineyard seeking employment, and was also a host to the other Chinese market gardeners in the area.

Kue Sum had three children. The couple intended to retire to China and purchased a property in Canton; however, the Communist victory in 1949 changed their plans, and in 1950 the couple sold the vineyard and moved to Blockhouse Bay, Auckland. Kue Sum died in 1967 and was buried beside her husband, who had died in 1959, at Waikumete Cemetery.
