= Joe Ah Chan =

Chinese and New Zealand horticulturist

Joe Ah Chan (Chan Hock Joe) (1882–14 December 1959) was a New Zealand greengrocer, horticulturist and wine-maker. He was born in Guangdong Province, China on 1882.

== Biography ==
Chan Hock Joe was born in 1882, at Ha Kei, Tsengshing (Zengcheng) county, in the Guangdong province of China. He emigrated to New Zealand around 1905, leaving his wife Yip Kue Sum in China.

Ah Chan worked in Wellington as a fruit and vegetable hawker. In about 1916 he sold the business and returned to China to help his wife learn English so that she could join him in New Zealand, returning in 1917. Kue Sum joined him in 1920 - they were married again in Auckland on 28 July 1920, as the New Zealand authorities did not recognise the marriage.

In 1923 Ah Chan, his wife and their two children, George and Daisy, moved to Thames, where their third child, Anne, was born. He established a market garden, grew glasshouse tomatoes, and later began growing tomatoes outdoors - Ah Chan became one of the first to grow them commercially in New Zealand.

He died in Auckland on 14 December 1959, and he was buried at Waikumete cemetery.

== Viticulture and winemaking ==
In 1925 Ah Chan began growing grapes at Totara and established Gold Leaf Vineyards. In 1929 Ah Chan produced his first batch of 1,000 gallons of wine.

In 1933 Ah Chan designed and built a large wooden reel to lay specially made six-foot rolls of wire-netting, which were used to protect the grapevines from bird damage. He also designed and installed a large water tank and an automatic pressurised piping system for spraying and irrigation.

In 1950 Ah Chan sold the vineyard to a distant kinsman, Stanley Young Chan, who changed its name to Totara Vineyards SYC. Ah Chan and his family settled in Blockhouse Bay, Auckland, on a five-acre property with six glasshouses, where he grew tomatoes for the Auckland markets.

== Political dealings ==
Ah Chan had been a founding member of the Chinese nationalist party, the Kuomintang, in New Zealand and served as chairman of its Waikato branch. He helped to raise funds for the Chinese revolutionary leader Sun Yat-sen. Later, he was a strong supporter of Chiang Kai-shek and made large donations to assist China's war effort against Japan. During the 1930s, Ah Chan became a member of the New Zealand Labour Party.
