= Green Bay, New Zealand =

Green Bay
- Suburb
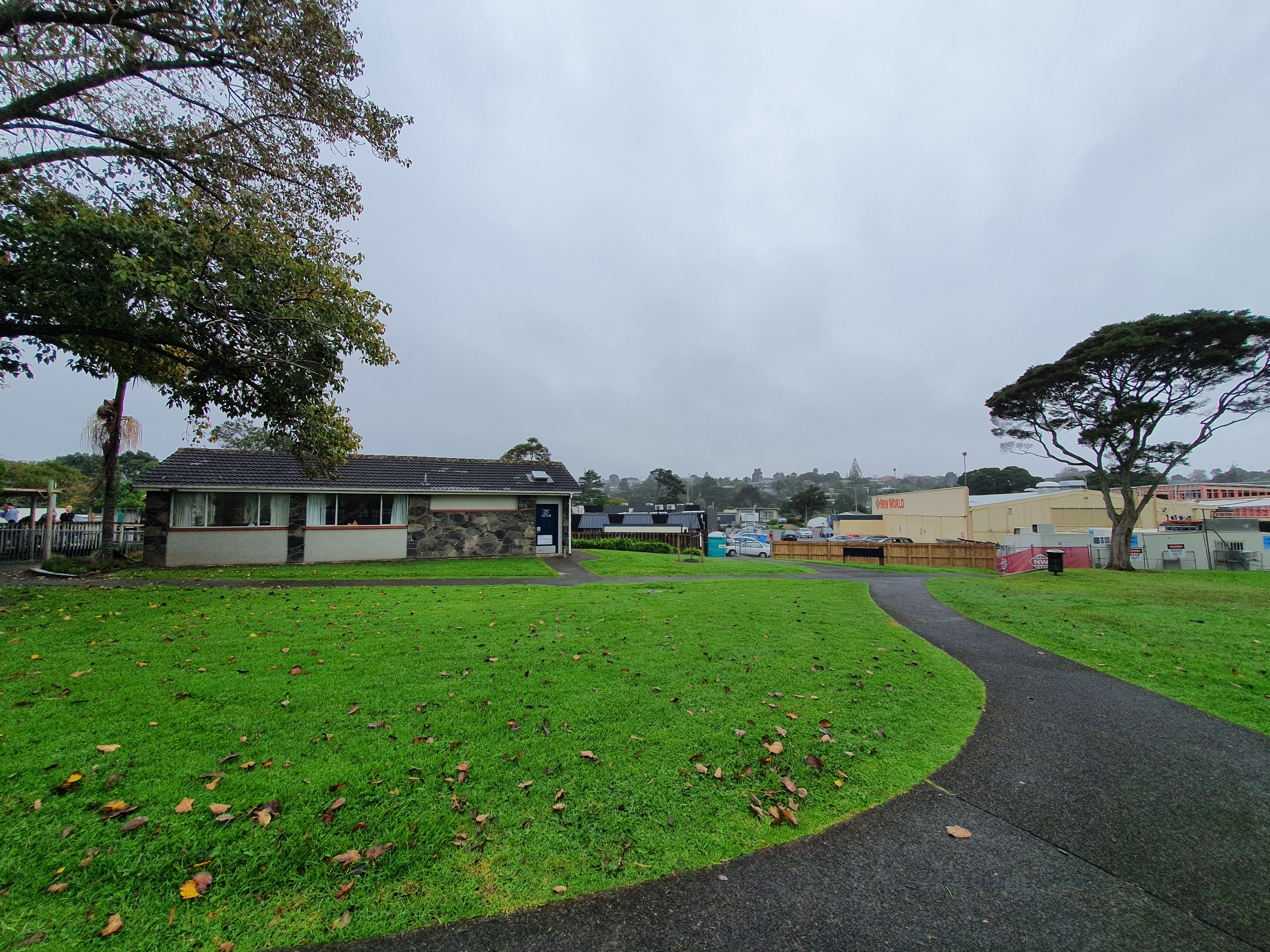
- Barron Green and Green Bay village
- Interactive map of Green Bay
- Coordinates: 36°55′46″S 174°41′06″E
- Country: New Zealand
- City: Auckland
- Local authority: Auckland Council
- Electoral ward: Whau ward
- Local board: Whau Local Board

Area
  - Land: 229 ha (570 acres)

Population (June 2025)
  - Total: 5,160
  - Density: 2,250/km^{2} (5,840/sq mi)

Titirangi North	New Lynn	Avondale
Titirangi	Green Bay	Blockhouse Bay
Wood Bay	(Manukau Harbour)	(Manukau Harbour)

Green Bay is a suburb of West Auckland. It is under the local governance of the Auckland Council. The main road running through Green Bay is Godley Road and this is the Urban Route 15 that follows through Green Bay to Titirangi and Laingholm.

Green Bay beach is part of the Karaka Park coastal walk. In pre-European times, the beach was the southern end of Te Toanga Waka, the Whau River portage connecting the Waitematā and Manukau harbours. At the west end of the beach there was a large Māori pā at Motukaraka (which is today Karaka Park). The area was originally called Karaka Bay, but was renamed to the current name to avoid confusion with other bays named Karaka.

New Zealand’s largest wild bird hospital and rescue centre, BirdCare Aotearoa, is based in Green Bay, managing more than 6,000 admissions of sick or injured birds each year.

== Demographics ==
Green Bay covers 2.29 km^{2} (0.88 sq mi) and had an estimated population of 5,160 as of June 2025, with a population density of 2,253 people per km^{2}.

Historical population
Year	Pop.	±% p.a.
2006	4,350	—
2013	4,596	+0.79%
2018	4,791	+0.83%
2023	4,914	+0.51%

Green Bay had a population of 4,914 in the 2023 New Zealand census, an increase of 123 people (2.6%) since the 2018 census, and an increase of 318 people (6.9%) since the 2013 census. There were 2,322 males, 2,577 females and 18 people of other genders in 1,947 dwellings. 2.7% of people identified as LGBTIQ+. The median age was 44.0 years (compared with 38.1 years nationally). There were 876 people (17.8%) aged under 15 years, 699 (14.2%) aged 15 to 29, 2,085 (42.4%) aged 30 to 64, and 1,251 (25.5%) aged 65 or older.

People could identify as more than one ethnicity. The results were 69.1% European (Pākehā); 9.0% Māori; 8.7% Pasifika; 24.2% Asian; 2.4% Middle Eastern, Latin American and African New Zealanders (MELAA); and 2.3% other, which includes people giving their ethnicity as "New Zealander". English was spoken by 95.5%, Māori language by 1.3%, Samoan by 1.6%, and other languages by 21.7%. No language could be spoken by 1.6% (e.g. too young to talk). New Zealand Sign Language was known by 0.2%. The percentage of people born overseas was 34.4, compared with 28.8% nationally.

Religious affiliations were 31.8% Christian, 6.5% Hindu, 2.3% Islam, 0.7% Māori religious beliefs, 1.2% Buddhist, 0.2% New Age, 0.1% Jewish, and 1.6% other religions. People who answered that they had no religion were 49.6%, and 6.0% of people did not answer the census question.

Of those at least 15 years old, 1,164 (28.8%) people had a bachelor's or higher degree, 1,863 (46.1%) had a post-high school certificate or diploma, and 1,020 (25.3%) people exclusively held high school qualifications. The median income was $38,700, compared with $41,500 nationally. 552 people (13.7%) earned over $100,000 compared to 12.1% nationally. The employment status of those at least 15 was that 1,809 (44.8%) people were employed full-time, 498 (12.3%) were part-time, and 84 (2.1%) were unemployed.

Individual statistical areas
Name	Area (km^{2})	Population	Density (per km^{2})	Dwellings	Median age	Median income
Green Bay North	1.04	1,887	1,814	693	40.7 years	$39,800
Green Bay South	1.26	3,027	2,402	1,254	46.3 years	$38,100
New Zealand					38.1 years	$41,500

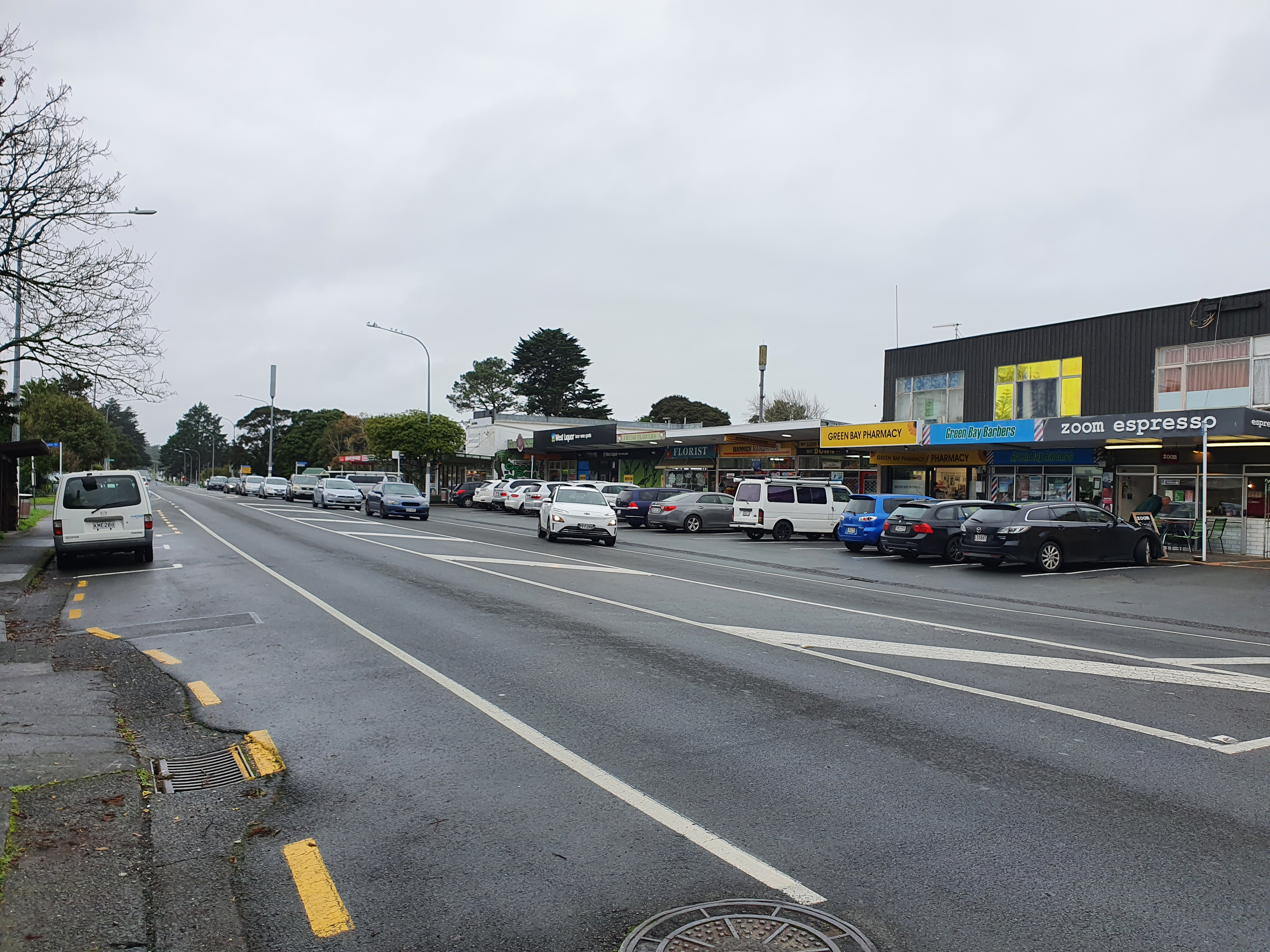
Green Bay shops

== Education ==
Green Bay High School is a secondary (years 9-13) school with a roll of 1829. It opened in 1973.

Green Bay Primary School is a full primary (years 1-8) school with a roll of 660. It opened in 1960, and covered years 1-6 until an intermediate department was added in 1997.

Both schools are coeducational, and situated next to each other on Godley Road.
