= Tracy Mulholland =

New Zealand politician

Whau ward Councillor
- In office 2019–2022
- Preceded by: Ross Clow
- Succeeded by: Kerrin Leoni

Tracy Mulholland is a New Zealand politician who was an Auckland Councillor.

== Political career ==
Auckland Council
Years	Ward	Affiliation
2019–2022	Whau	Communities and Residents

In the early 1990s, Mulholland was the marketing manager for LynnMall. In the 2000s, she worked for the Manukau City Council, Waitakere City Council and Auckland, Tourism, Events and Economic Development (ATEED). Between 2010 and 2016, Mulholland was the general manager of the New Lynn Business Association.

In 2016, Mulholland campaigned as the New Zealand Labour Party candidate for the Whau Local Board, becoming the board chairman.

In June 2019, Mulholland cut ties with the Labour Party, joining the right-leaning local body ticket Communities and Residents. In the 2019 local body elections, Mulholland was elected the Whau ward counsellor, receiving 5,853 votes, narrowly beating her competitor Ross Clow from the Labour Party. Mulholland lost the 2022 elections to Labour Party candidate Kerrin Leoni.
