= New Windsor, New Zealand =

New Windsor
- Suburb
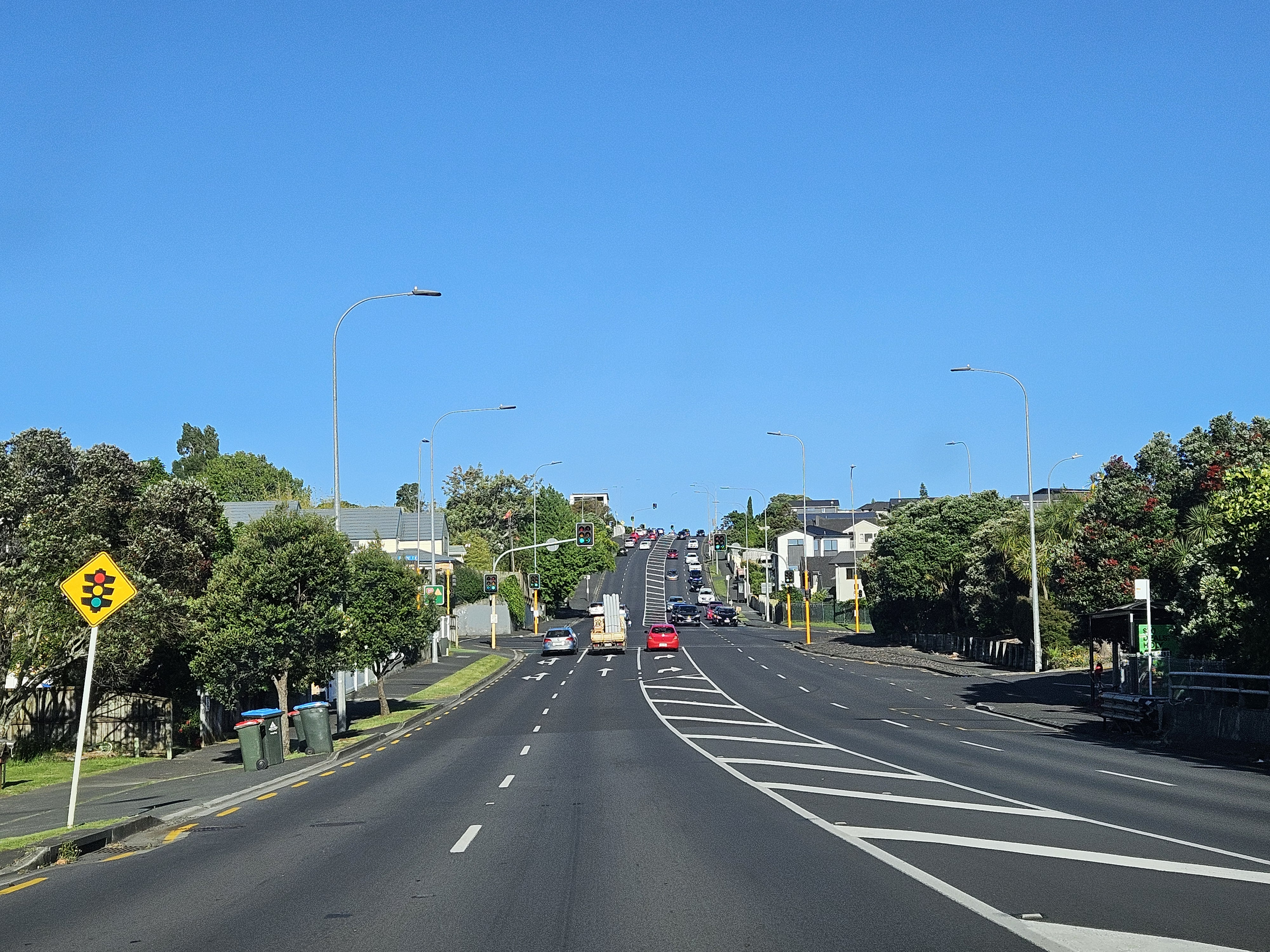
- View looking east on Tiverton Road in New Windsor
- Interactive map of New Windsor
- Coordinates: 36.906911°S 174.710597°E
- Country: New Zealand
- City: Auckland
- Local authority: Auckland Council
- Electoral ward: Whau Ward
- Local board: Whau Local Board

Area
  - Land: 199 ha (490 acres)

Population (June 2025)
  - Total: 8,800
  - Density: 4,400/km^{2} (11,000/sq mi)

	Mt Albert
Avondale	New Windsor	Mt Roskill
	Blockhouse Bay

New Windsor (Māori: Niu Winiha), founded in 1865, is a suburb of Auckland, New Zealand. It is located 10 kilometres (6.2 mi) from the Auckland city centre, between Mount Albert, Blockhouse Bay, Mt Roskill and Avondale.

== History ==
In the early 20th century, the area was well known for market gardens. New Windsor developed as suburban housing in the 1950s and 1960s. During this time, the area was officially known as Avondale East. In 1984, the name New Windsor, previously only used as a colloquial name, was officially adopted as the name of the suburb.

== Demographics ==
New Windsor covers 1.99 km^{2} (0.77 sq mi) and had an estimated population of 8,800 as of June 2025, with a population density of 4,422 people per km^{2}.

Historical population
Year	Pop.	±% p.a.
2006	7,095	—
2013	7,281	+0.37%
2018	7,758	+1.28%
2023	7,737	−0.05%

New Windsor had a population of 7,737 in the 2023 New Zealand census, a decrease of 21 people (−0.3%) since the 2018 census, and an increase of 456 people (6.3%) since the 2013 census. There were 3,966 males, 3,747 females and 24 people of other genders in 2,238 dwellings. 2.7% of people identified as LGBTIQ+. The median age was 34.8 years (compared with 38.1 years nationally). There were 1,395 people (18.0%) aged under 15 years, 1,716 (22.2%) aged 15 to 29, 3,708 (47.9%) aged 30 to 64, and 918 (11.9%) aged 65 or older.

People could identify as more than one ethnicity. The results were 26.9% European (Pākehā); 8.1% Māori; 18.4% Pasifika; 54.5% Asian; 4.3% Middle Eastern, Latin American and African New Zealanders (MELAA); and 1.5% other, which includes people giving their ethnicity as "New Zealander". English was spoken by 88.6%, Māori language by 1.3%, Samoan by 4.7%, and other languages by 42.4%. No language could be spoken by 2.3% (e.g. too young to talk). New Zealand Sign Language was known by 0.4%. The percentage of people born overseas was 53.4, compared with 28.8% nationally.

Religious affiliations were 30.3% Christian, 15.4% Hindu, 10.8% Islam, 0.5% Māori religious beliefs, 2.2% Buddhist, 0.2% New Age, and 1.8% other religions. People who answered that they had no religion were 33.0%, and 5.7% of people did not answer the census question.

Of those at least 15 years old, 2,013 (31.7%) people had a bachelor's or higher degree, 2,421 (38.2%) had a post-high school certificate or diploma, and 1,905 (30.0%) people exclusively held high school qualifications. The median income was $39,300, compared with $41,500 nationally. 567 people (8.9%) earned over $100,000 compared to 12.1% nationally. The employment status of those at least 15 was that 3,351 (52.8%) people were employed full-time, 729 (11.5%) were part-time, and 231 (3.6%) were unemployed.

Individual statistical areas
Name	Area (km^{2})	Population	Density (per km^{2})	Dwellings	Median age	Median income
New Windsor North	0.87	3,306	3,800	951	36.0 years	$38,900
New Windsor South	0.54	1,983	3,672	579	35.4 years	$40,200
New Windsor East	0.58	2,448	4,221	705	32.9 years	$39,100
New Zealand					38.1 years	$41,500

== Education ==
New Windsor School is a contributing primary school (years 1-6) with a roll of 331.

Christ the King Catholic School is a state-integrated Catholic full primary school (years 1-8) with a roll of 110. The school was opened in 1954, originally as a private school by the Sisters of St Joseph of the Sacred Heart.

Both schools are coeducational. Rolls are as of March 2026.

Local secondary schools are Avondale College and Lynfield College.
