= Whau Local Board =

Coordinates: 36°54′34.2″S 174°40′54.65″E

Whau Local Board Te Poari ā-Rohe o Whau
- Local board of Whau
- Whau in Auckland
- Country: New Zealand
- Region: Auckland
- Territorial authority: Auckland
- Ward: Whau ward
- Legislated: 2010

Area
  - Land: 26.85 km^{2} (10.37 sq mi)

Population (June 2025)
  - Total: 91,300
  - Density: 3,400/km^{2} (8,810/sq mi)

Local Board Members

Leadership
- Chairperson: Kay Thomas, Labour
- Deputy chairperson: Fasitua Amosa, Labour

Structure
- Seats: 7
- Political groups: Labour (4); Independents (3)
- Length of term: 3 years

Elections
- Last election: 2025
- Next election: 2028

Meeting place
- 31 Totara Avenue, New Lynn

The Whau Local Board is one of the 21 local boards of Auckland Council. It is the only local board overseen by the council's Whau Ward councillor.

The Whau board, named after the Whau River estuary which runs through the board area, covers the suburbs of Avondale, Blockhouse Bay, Green Bay, Kelston, New Lynn and New Windsor.

The board consists of seven members elected at large. The inaugural members were elected in the nationwide 2010 local elections, coinciding with the introduction of the Auckland Council.

== Area ==
The Whau Local Board area takes its name from Whau River estuary arm of the Waitematā Harbour, which extends into the area.

The area includes the suburbs of Avondale, Blockhouse Bay, Green Bay, Kelston, New Lynn, New Windsor and Rosebank.

New Lynn is the primary retail shopping area, and Kelston and Rosebank have significant industrial areas.

== Demographics ==
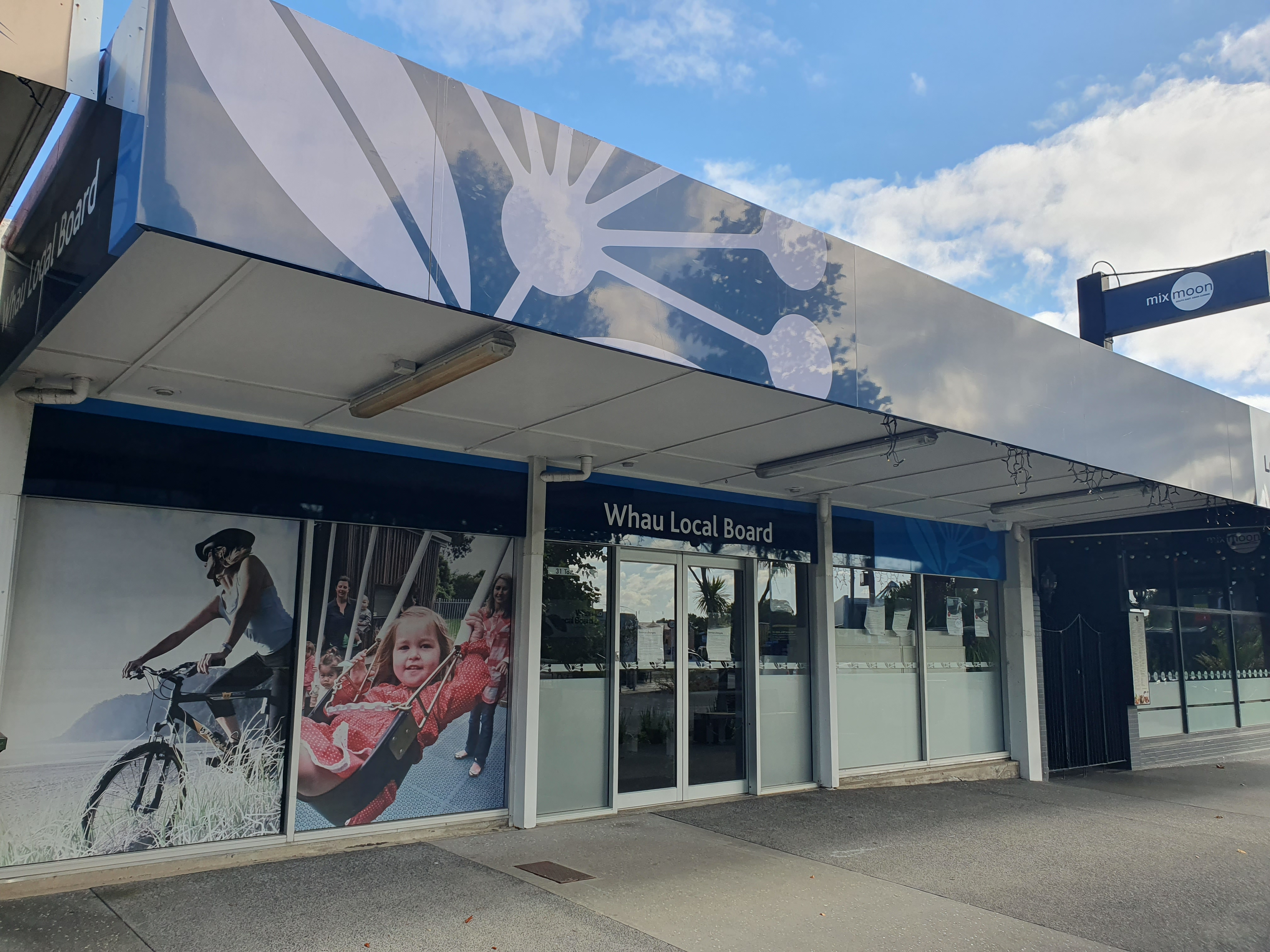
Whau Local Board office in New Lynn

Whau Local Board Area covers 26.85 km^{2} (10.37 sq mi) and had an estimated population of 91,300 as of June 2025, with a population density of 3,400 people per km^{2}.

== 2025–2028 term ==
The board's term currently runs from the 2025 local body elections to the local body elections in 2028. The current board members are:

Name	Affiliation	Position
Kay Thomas	Labour	Chairperson
Fasitua Amosa	Labour	Deputy Chairperson
Catherine Farmer	Independent	Board member
Warren Piper	Independent	Board member
Ross Clow	Independent	Board member
Fania Kapao	Labour	Board member
Rebecca Thomson	Labour	Board member

== 2022–2025 term ==
The board's term from the 2022 local body elections to the local body elections in 2025. They were:

- Kay Thomas (chair)
- Fasitua Amosa (deputy chair)
- Valeria Gascoigne (replacing Susan Zhu)
- Catherine Farmer
- Warren Piper
- Sarah Paterson-Hamlin
- Ross Clow

== 2019–2022 term ==
The board's term from the 2019 local body elections to the local body elections in 2022. The board members were:

- Kay Thomas (chair)
- Susan Zhu (deputy chair)
- Catherine Farmer
- Warren Piper
- Fasitua Amosa
- Ulalemamae Te'eva Matafai
- Jessica Rose
