= Kerrin Leoni =

New Zealand politician

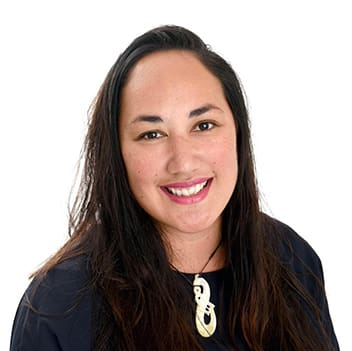

Auckland Councillor for the Whau ward
- In office 28 October 2022 – 31 October 2025
- Preceded by: Tracy Mulholland
- Succeeded by: Sarah Paterson-Hamlin

Personal details
- Born: 1979 or 1980 (age 46–47)
- Party: Labour (2020–2026); Independent (2026– present)
- Education: King's College London

Kerrin Leoni is a New Zealand politician who served as an Auckland Councillor for the Whau ward from 2022 to 2025. She ran unsuccessfully in the 2025 Auckland mayoral election, placing second to incumbent Wayne Brown. She was the Labour Party candidate for the Tāmaki Makaurau electorate, but withdrew two weeks out from the 2026 general election. Leoni subsequently stood as an independent candidate during that election.

== Early life ==
Leoni is of Māori (Ngāti Pāoa, Ngāi Takoto, and Ngāti Kurī) and European (Italian and Irish) descent. Leoni attended King's College London and received a master’s degree in economics and international politics. Leoni also has a master's degree, completed in 2007, from Auckland University of Technology. Her thesis was on young Māori children leaving foster care in New Zealand. Leoni spent 10 years of her life living in London, where she ran a contracting business and was a member of the cultural group Ngāti Rānana. She returned to New Zealand in the mid-2010s.

== Political career ==
Auckland Council
Years	Ward	Affiliation
2022–2025	Whau	Labour

=== Local government, 2019–2025 ===
Leoni was elected to the Waitematā Local Board in 2019 on the City Vision ticket. She served as deputy chair for the first half of the term. On 23 February 2020, Leoni was selected as Labour's candidate for the Waikato electorate for the 2020 election, officially launching her campaign in August. Despite a strong pro-Labour swing, Leoni lost to the incumbent National MP Tim van de Molen. Her list placement of 66th was not high enough to enter parliament.

In the 2022 local body elections, Leoni was elected as a councillor for the Whau ward, after narrowly winning the election from the incumbent councillor Tracy Mulholland. Leoni was the first female Māori councillor to be elected to the Auckland Council. She was sworn in alongside the rest of the council on 28 October.

In 2024, Leoni announced that she would run for Mayor of Auckland in the 2025 elections. She received 22.16% of the vote, placing second to incumbent mayor Wayne Brown. She did not seek re-election to her council seat, and was succeeded by Sarah Paterson-Hamlin.

=== 2026 general election and withdrawal ===
In March 2026 Leoni was selected to be the Labour Party candidate in the Tāmaki Makaurau electorate at the 2026 general election.

During an election debate hosted by Whakaata Māori (Māori Television) on 21 October 2026, Te Pāti Māori's Tāmaki Makaurau candidate and MP Oriini Kaipara accused Leoni of attending an election hui (meeting) at a Mongrel Mob gang pad the week before. When Leoni denied attending the event, Kaipara pointed out that there was a social media post confirming her presence at that event, which had since been deleted. Leoni and Kaipara were in a tight race for the Tāmaki Makaurau electorate, with the latter leading by two points in a recent Whakaata Māori-Curia poll for that electorate. On 22 October Te Ao Māori News released a video showing Leoni attending a Mongrel Mob gathering on 3 October in Papakura, Auckland. During the visit, she wore Labour campaign branding and urged attendees to vote. During the election debate the previous day, Leoni acknowledged she had relatives who were gang members. In response, Labour Party leader Chris Hipkins said that he accepted Leoni's account that she had not visited the gang pad for electoral campaigning purposes. Hipkins had earlier criticised Green and Te Pāti Māori candidates for meeting with members of the Mongrel Mob. Later that day, Leoni said she had attended a family function with some relatives who were gang members but denied visiting a gang pad during the 2026 election campaign.

On 23 October, National Party MP Paul Goldsmith criticised Leoni for socialising with gang members while wearing a party-branded jacket, saying it was an "appalling look" for the Labour Party and Mongrel Mob to be seen fundraising for each other. That same day, Leoni resigned as a Labour candidate. Despite initially supporting Leoni, Hipkins said that footage of her campaigning alongside gangs was "inconsistent with the standards" expected for Labour candidates. While acknowledging that one could not choose their family, Hipkins said he "firmly believe people should be supported to leave gangs and turn their lives around." Since nominations for the 2026 general election have closed, Leoni's name remains on the ballot, but she is no longer endorsed by the Labour Party. Following her resignation, Leoni issued a statement stating that she had resigned due to the "intense focus on her whanau and community."

On 26 October, Leoni confirmed that she would remain in the Tāmaki Makaurau race but would sit in Parliament as an independent candidate if elected during the 2026 general election. During the 2026 general election held on 7 November, Leoni came second place behind the incumbent TPM MP Kaipara; winning 6,007 votes. Unable to enter Parliament via the Labour party list, Leoni subsequently conceded the race.
