= Blockhouse Bay =

- Suburb
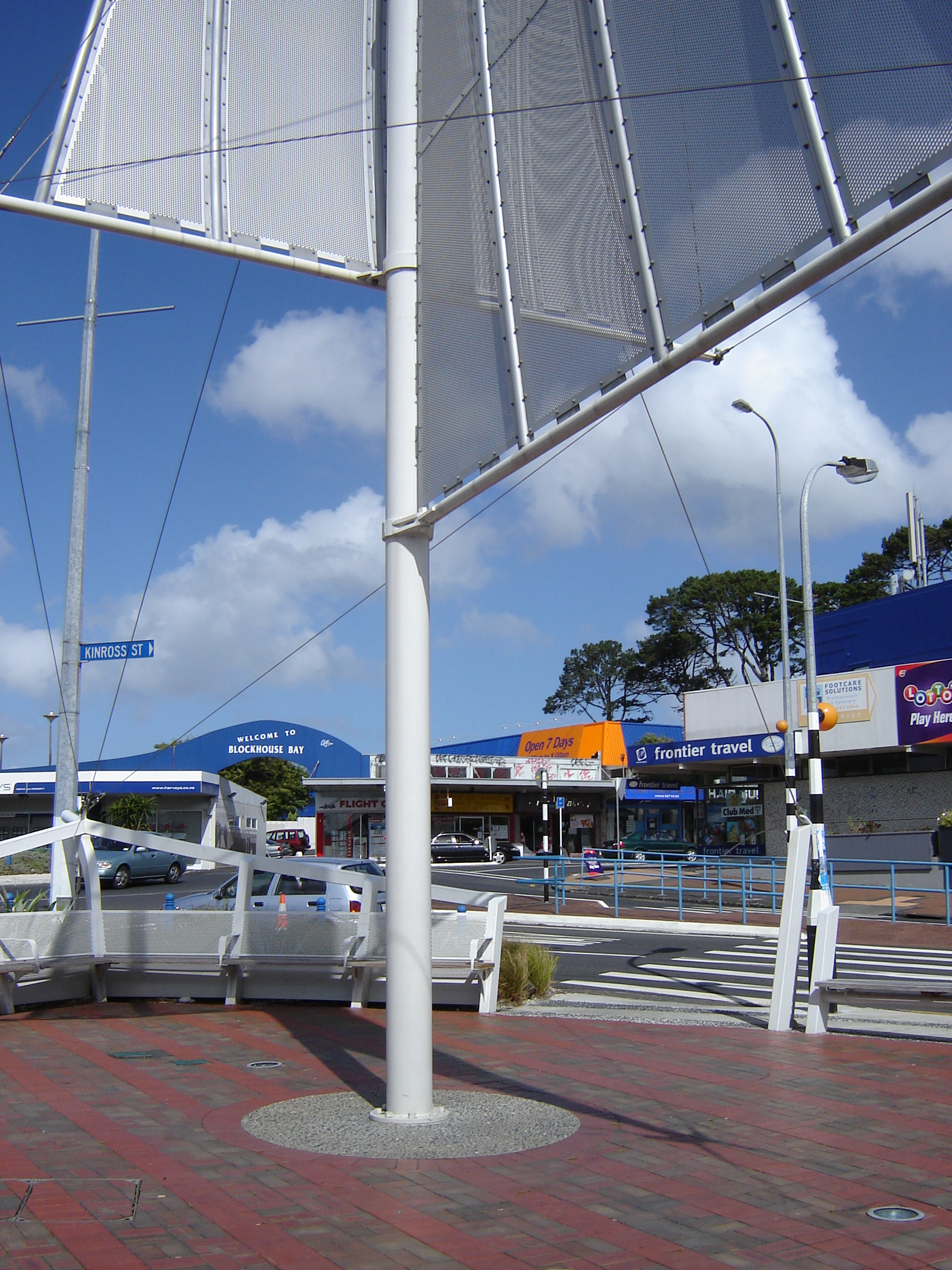
- The Blockhouse Bay town centre.
- Interactive map of Blockhouse Bay
- Coordinates: 36.9167°S 174.7089°E
- Country: New Zealand
- City: Auckland
- Local authority: Auckland Council
- Electoral ward: Whau ward
- Local board: Whau Local Board

Area
  - Land: 391 ha (970 acres)

Population (June 2025)
  - Total: 14,640
  - Density: 3,740/km^{2} (9,700/sq mi)

Avondale	New Windsor	New Windsor
New Lynn	Blockhouse Bay	Mount Roskill
Green Bay	(Manukau Harbour)	Lynfield

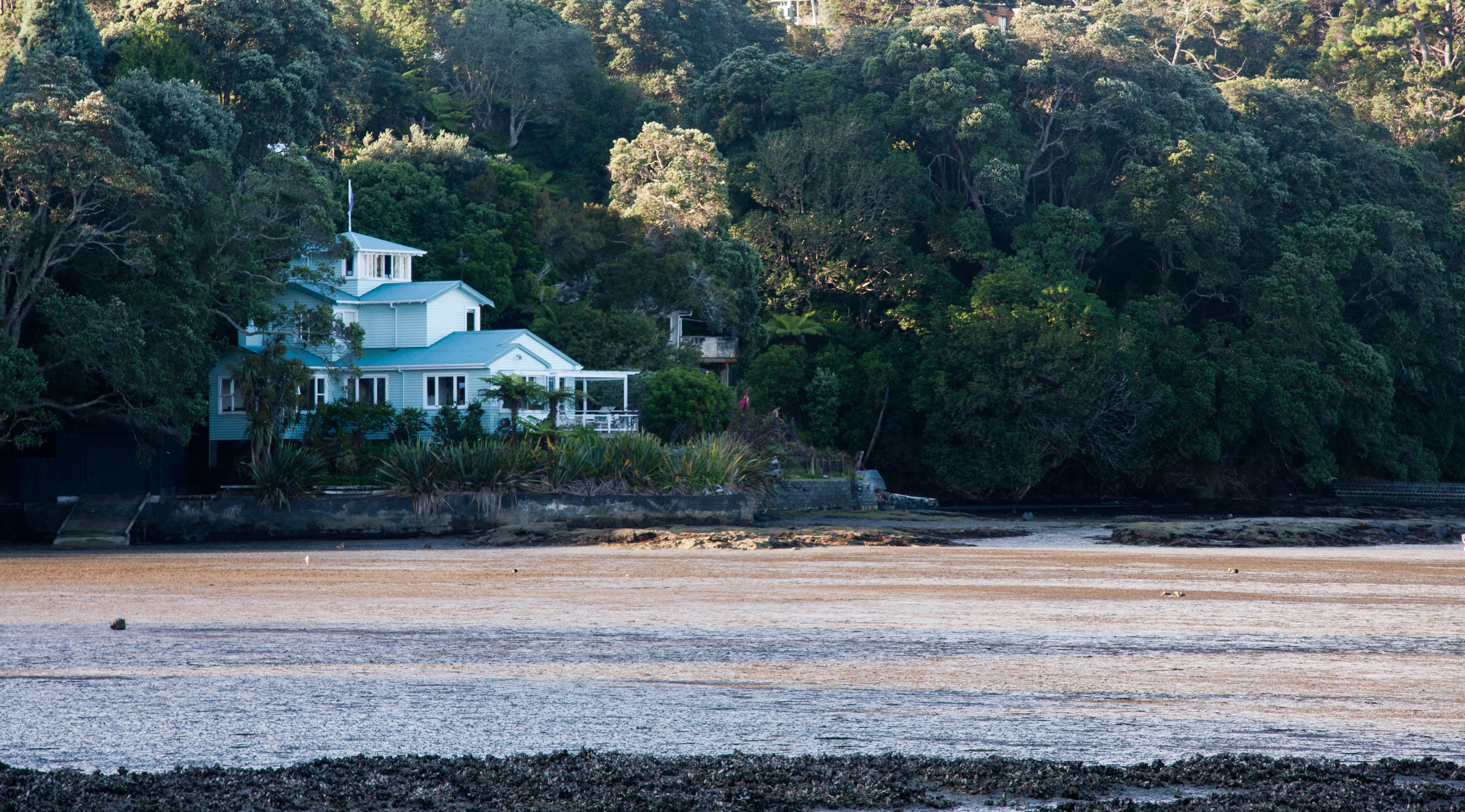
Blockhouse Bay beach

Blockhouse Bay is a residential suburb in the south west of Auckland, in New Zealand's North Island. It is sited on the northern coast of the Manukau Harbour, and is also close to the administrative boundary that existed between Auckland City and Waitakere City, two of the former four cities of what was the Auckland conurbation before amalgamation into Auckland Council.

The suburb is located 11 kilometres to the southwest of the city centre, and is surrounded by the more central suburbs of Lynfield and New Windsor, and the Waitakere suburbs of New Lynn and Green Bay.

The Blockhouse Bay Library is located in the town centre, as is the Blockhouse Bay Community Centre, located 200 metres from the library.

== Etymology ==
Blockhouse Bay had its current name officially adopted in 1948. Earlier it was known by the name Avondale South and before that it was considered part of Waikomiti. The name is derived from the block houses that were constructed on the site during the New Zealand Wars.

== History ==
=== Early history ===
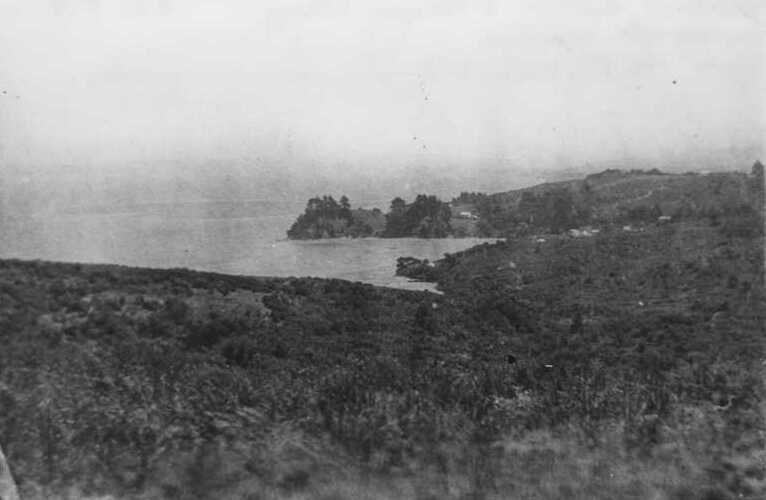
Blockhouse Bay circa 1917

Portage Road is the location of Te Tōanga Waka, one of the overland routes between the two harbours (and thus the Pacific Ocean and the Tasman Sea), where Māori would beach their waka (canoes) and drag them overland to the other coast, thus avoiding having to paddle around North Cape. This made the area of immense strategic importance in both pre-European times and during the early years of European occupation.

The earliest European known to have trekked through, and followed the coastline of the Manukau Harbour in an endeavour to find if there was a waterway connecting the two harbours, was the Rev. Samuel Marsden in 1820. Two missionaries who had arrived in New Zealand on 30 December 1834, William Colenso and R. Wade, walked through the Whau South area in 1838 hoping to find a Māori settlement, but the pā site on Te Whau point had been abandoned some time before. They remarked that the area was "open and barren heaths, dreary, sterile and wild."

Te Whau Bay was used as a camping spot for European settlers during the early colonial era of Auckland.

=== The Blockhouse ===
A wooden blockhouse was constructed over Te Whau Bay in 1860. At this time the first land war in Taranaki was escalating and there were fears it would spread north and so a defence system for Auckland was actioned. A 12-acre site was chosen, bordered by Esplanade (Endeavour Street), Gilfillan Street, Wynyard Road (Blockhouse Bay Road) and Boylan Street (Wade Street). The actual Whau Blockhouse was located on what is now No. 8 Gilfillan Street.

The site was chosen for two reasons:

- The elevated cleared 12-acre (49,000 m^{2}) site provided an unobstructed view towards the Manukau Heads, the source of possible attack from southern Māori tribes.
- It was close to the Whau Portage which was the route favoured by northern Māori tribes.

Colonel Thomas Mould of the Royal Engineers was charged with planning the location and type of defence system needed. A blockhouse is a purpose-built building with walls thick enough to stop musket ball penetration, with slits in the walls for defensive musket fire, a fence or stockade surrounding the building, with a trench beyond that.

The blockhouse was manned by the 57th (West Middlesex) Regiment of Foot and the 65th (2nd Yorkshire, North Riding) Regiment of Foot until 1863. Never seeing military action, the blockhouse was rented out to a tenant in the 1880s and was gutted in a fire. It was subsequently demolished. The trenches were apparently still visible in the 1940s but have since been obscured.

=== Urban development ===
The earliest industry, in 1884, was the Gittos Tannery. The early 1900s saw other industries such as poultry, orchards, potteries, strawberries, flowers, loganberries and small farm holdings.

A bach community at Blockhouse Bay developed in the early 1900s, with the area becoming a popular holiday resort for Aucklanders in the 1920s, with families making the journey over rough roads to spend the summer at the beach. During the Great Depression in the 1930s, workers developed the Blockhouse Bay beachfront area, building stone walls and pathways.

== Demographics ==
Blockhouse Bay covers 3.91 km^{2} (1.51 sq mi) and had an estimated population of 14,640 as of June 2025, with a population density of 3,744 people per km^{2}.

Historical population
Year	Pop.	±% p.a.
2006	11,022	—
2013	11,580	+0.71%
2018	12,840	+2.09%
2023	13,107	+0.41%

Blockhouse Bay had a population of 13,107 in the 2023 New Zealand census, an increase of 267 people (2.1%) since the 2018 census, and an increase of 1,527 people (13.2%) since the 2013 census. There were 6,537 males, 6,525 females and 45 people of other genders in 4,119 dwellings. 3.3% of people identified as LGBTIQ+. The median age was 38.6 years (compared with 38.1 years nationally). There were 2,208 people (16.8%) aged under 15 years, 2,625 (20.0%) aged 15 to 29, 6,135 (46.8%) aged 30 to 64, and 2,136 (16.3%) aged 65 or older.

People could identify as more than one ethnicity. The results were 33.5% European (Pākehā); 6.1% Māori; 10.9% Pasifika; 55.8% Asian; 2.8% Middle Eastern, Latin American and African New Zealanders (MELAA); and 1.6% other, which includes people giving their ethnicity as "New Zealander". English was spoken by 90.8%, Māori language by 1.0%, Samoan by 3.2%, and other languages by 42.4%. No language could be spoken by 1.9% (e.g. too young to talk). New Zealand Sign Language was known by 0.4%. The percentage of people born overseas was 53.1, compared with 28.8% nationally.

Religious affiliations were 30.3% Christian, 16.7% Hindu, 9.1% Islam, 0.1% Māori religious beliefs, 2.0% Buddhist, 0.2% New Age, and 1.8% other religions. People who answered that they had no religion were 33.9%, and 6.1% of people did not answer the census question.

Of those at least 15 years old, 3,768 (34.6%) people had a bachelor's or higher degree, 4,041 (37.1%) had a post-high school certificate or diploma, and 3,087 (28.3%) people exclusively held high school qualifications. The median income was $40,600, compared with $41,500 nationally. 1,275 people (11.7%) earned over $100,000 compared to 12.1% nationally. The employment status of those at least 15 was that 5,652 (51.9%) people were employed full-time, 1,281 (11.8%) were part-time, and 288 (2.6%) were unemployed.

Individual statistical areas
Name	Area (km^{2})	Population	Density (per km^{2})	Dwellings	Median age	Median income
Blockhouse Bay North	0.59	2,493	4,225	786	36.1 years	$39,900
Blockhouse Bay Central	0.96	3,147	3,278	1,023	38.2 years	$38,900
Blockhouse Bay North East	0.53	2,262	4,268	687	37.0 years	$43,100
Blockhouse Bay South	1.26	2,982	2,367	945	39.9 years	$45,100
Blockhouse Bay East	0.56	2,226	3,975	681	43.2 years	$35,400
New Zealand					38.1 years	$41,500

== Education ==
Blockhouse Bay Intermediate is a school for years 7–8 with a roll of 834. The school was established in 1959.

Blockhouse Bay Primary School, Chaucer School, and Glenavon School are primary schools for years 1–6 (years 1–8 for Glenavon) with rolls of 527, 197 and 352 students, respectively.

St Dominic's Catholic School is a state-integrated contributing primary school for years 1–6 with a roll of 264.

Auckland International College was a private senior secondary school which was founded in 2003 on another site but closed in 2023. It was located in Heaphy St on the site of a former private school Hilltop School which closed in 2009.

All these schools are coeducational. Rolls are as of July 2026.

Local state or state-integrated secondary schools are Lynfield College, Mount Roskill Grammar School, Green Bay High School, and Marcellin College .

== Sport and recreation ==
- Gittos Domain is a large nature reserve that was set aside in the early 20th Century.
- Blockhouse Bay Beach Reserve became a public park in 1870. It is home to the Blockhouse Bay Boat Club.
- The Bay Roskill Vikings rugby league club are based at Blockhouse Bay reserve.
