= Ross Clow =

New Zealand politician

Ross Clow (born 1953/54) is a New Zealand Labour Party politician who served as a councillor on the Auckland Council from 2013 to 2019. He was earlier a Waitakere City Councillor.

== Early life and career ==
Clow grew up in Matamata and studied economics and political science at the University of Auckland. He graduated in 1984.

== Political career ==
Auckland Council
Years	Ward	Affiliation
2013–2016	Whau	Labour
2016–2019	Whau	Labour

At the 1984 he stood as the Labour Party candidate for the seat of Matamata.

Clow served on the Waitakere City Council, where he served as finance chairman.

At the 2010 Auckland elections, Clow stood for Auckland Council in the Whau ward, finishing second and losing to Auckland City Councillor Noelene Raffills by fewer than 500 votes.

At the 2013 Auckland elections, Clow was elected as an Auckland councillor for the Whau ward, defeating Noelene Raffills. He became the finance committee chairman on Auckland Council.

In 2016, Clow was comfortably reelected as councillor for the ward and was also elected to the Portage Licensing Trust. The new mayor, Phil Goff, appointed Clow the chairperson of the finance and performance committee.

In 2019, Clow was defeated by Tracy Mulholland of Communities and Residents by less than 200 votes.
