= 2016 Environment Canterbury election =

Local election in New Zealand

- 8 October 2016

The 2016 Environment Canterbury election was a local election held from September to 8 October in the Canterbury region of New Zealand as part of that year's nation-wide local elections. Voters elected 7 councillors for the 2016–2019 term of Environment Canterbury; 6 government-appointed commissions also held seats on the council following the election. Postal voting and the first-past-the-post voting system were used.

== Environment Canterbury ==
=== Christchurch constituency (4) ===
Christchurch constituency election
Party	Candidate	Votes	%	±%
The People's Choice – Independent	Lan Pham	55,313		
The People's Choice – Independent	Cynthia Roberts	50,255		
Independent	Rod Cullinane	42,491		
The People's Choice	Steve Lowndes	39,181		
Community Voice .nz	Rik Tindall	32,538		
Independent	Craig Pauling	27,553		
None	Terry Huggins	11,707		
None	Drucilla Kingi-Patterson	8,926		
Total valid votes		267,964		
Informal votes		81		
Turnout				
Registered electors				
