= Noelene Raffills =

New Zealand politician

Noelene Mary Raffills is a New Zealand politician who was an Auckland Councillor.

== Political career ==
Auckland Council
Years	Ward	Affiliation
2010–2013	Whau	Citizens & Ratepayers

Between 2000 and 2010 she was a councillor on the Auckland City Council. She joined the council by winning a by-election called following the death of the incumbent, her husband Phil Raffills.

In the 2010 Auckland Council elections Raffills won the seat in the Whau ward. Elected as a centre-right Citizens & Ratepayers' candidate, Raffills became a supporter of the centre-left mayor Len Brown and abandoned the ticket in 2013. She stood for re-election as an independent, but was defeated by Ross Clow in the 2013 Auckland Council elections.

== Personal life ==
Noeline Raffills married Phil Raffills, who was principal of Avondale College. They had met at a university Christian conference in Dunedin. Phil Raffills was also active in politics, as a councillor on Auckland City Council from 1995 until his death from leukemia in 2010 and as the National Party candidate in Owairaka at the 1996 general election.
