= Green Bay High School, New Zealand =

Green Bay High School
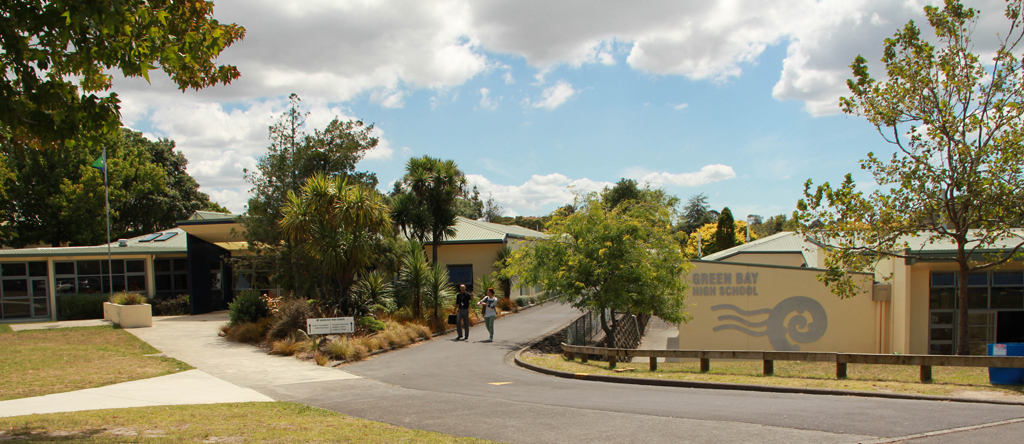
- Green Bay High School in 2013

Location
- 143–161 Godley Road; Green Bay; Auckland; 36.930950°S 174.669400°E

Information
- Type: State, Co-educational, Secondary
- Established: 1973
- Ministry of Education Institution no.: 42
- Principal: Fiona Barker
- Enrolment: 1,959 (July 2026)
- Website: greenbayhigh.school.nz

Green Bay High School is a co-educational secondary school in the West Auckland suburb of Green Bay, New Zealand, catering for students from Year 9 to Year 13. The school primarily serves the communities of Green Bay and Titirangi.

== History ==
The school opened in 1973. The founding principal of the school, Des Mann, challenged many of the standard educational practices of the 1970s. He refused to allow students to be caned, did not enforce a school uniform, and did not stream pupils into academic and non-academic classes.

The school has since adopted a uniform, and began awarding prizes. In 1978, Green Bay High School opened Kākāriki Marae, the first marae built on high school grounds, after lobbying by Pat Heremaia, the head of Māori Language studies at Green Bay. Heremaia presented a paper in 1984 to the Māori Educational Development Conference, discussing the success of Kākāriki Marae, which was one of the factors which led to marae becoming common in New Zealand schools.

== Enrolment ==
As of July 2026, Green Bay High School has a roll of 1,959 students, of which 261 (13.3%) identify as Māori.

As of 2026, the school has an Equity Index of 430, placing it amongst schools whose students have below average socioeconomic barriers to achievement (roughly equivalent to deciles 6 and 7 under the former socio-economic decile system).

== Notable staff ==
- Carla Van Zon, artistic director and former physical education teacher

== Notable alumni ==
- Mark Bourneville, NZ & France rugby league player
- Riki Cowan, NZ rugby league player
- Carl Evans, sailor
- Dylan Horrocks, cartoonist
- Ria Percival, NZ soccer player
- Te Raukura O'Connell Rapira, community worker and activist
- Fabian Soutar, rugby league player

== Biography ==
- Devaliant, Judith (2009). "History Lessons". In Macdonald, Finlay; Kerr, Ruth (eds.). West: The History of Waitakere. Random House. pp. 195–216. ISBN 9781869790080.
