= Whau ward =

- Ward of Auckland
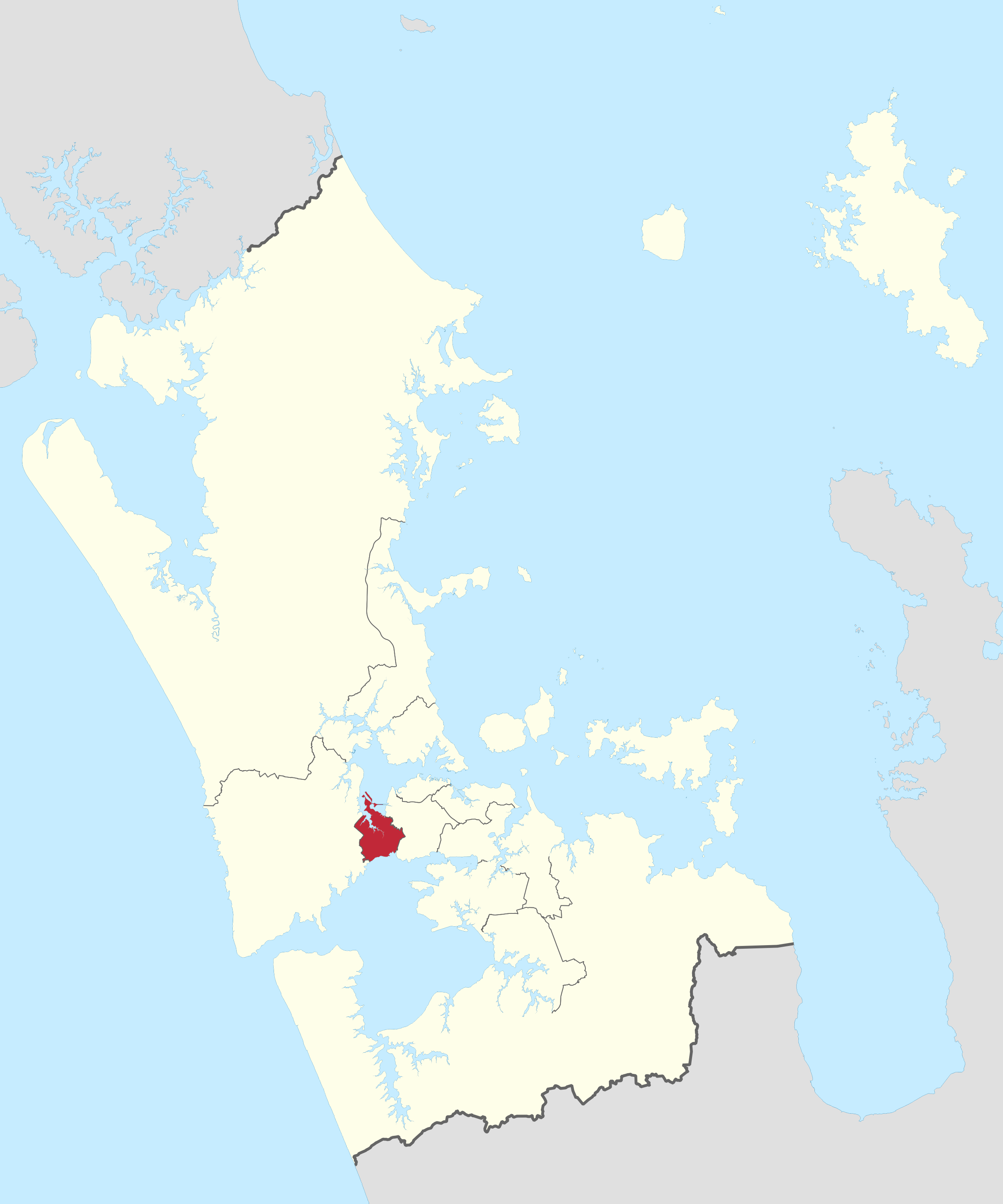
- Country: New Zealand
- Island: North Island
- Region: Auckland Region

Area
  - Land: 26.85 km^{2} (10.37 sq mi)

Population (June 2025)
  - Total: 91,300
  - Density: 3,400/km^{2} (8,810/sq mi)

The Whau ward is an Auckland Council ward which elects one councillor and covers the Whau local board area. The current councillor is Sarah Paterson-Hamlin.

== Demographics ==
Whau ward covers 26.85 km^{2} (10.37 sq mi) and had an estimated population of 91,300 as of June 2025, with a population density of 3,400 people per km^{2}.

Historical population
Year	Pop.	±% p.a.
2006	69,171	—
2013	72,594	+0.69%
2018	79,356	+1.80%
2023	81,273	+0.48%

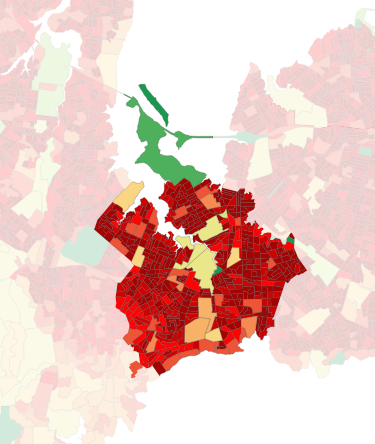
Population density in the 2023 census

Whau ward had a population of 81,273 in the 2023 New Zealand census, an increase of 1,917 people (2.4%) since the 2018 census, and an increase of 8,679 people (12.0%) since the 2013 census. There were 40,752 males, 40,188 females and 336 people of other genders in 26,526 dwellings. 3.6% of people identified as LGBTIQ+. The median age was 35.9 years (compared with 38.1 years nationally). There were 15,258 people (18.8%) aged under 15 years, 16,602 (20.4%) aged 15 to 29, 38,805 (47.7%) aged 30 to 64, and 10,608 (13.1%) aged 65 or older.

People could identify as more than one ethnicity. The results were 37.6% European (Pākehā); 11.0% Māori; 19.7% Pasifika; 42.2% Asian; 3.5% Middle Eastern, Latin American and African New Zealanders (MELAA); and 1.5% other, which includes people giving their ethnicity as "New Zealander". English was spoken by 90.7%, Māori language by 2.4%, Samoan by 5.9%, and other languages by 34.5%. No language could be spoken by 2.6% (e.g. too young to talk). New Zealand Sign Language was known by 0.5%. The percentage of people born overseas was 47.2, compared with 28.8% nationally.

Religious affiliations were 33.7% Christian, 11.1% Hindu, 6.4% Islam, 0.7% Māori religious beliefs, 2.2% Buddhist, 0.3% New Age, 0.1% Jewish, and 1.9% other religions. People who answered that they had no religion were 37.6%, and 6.1% of people did not answer the census question.

Of those at least 15 years old, 20,430 (30.9%) people had a bachelor's or higher degree, 26,292 (39.8%) had a post-high school certificate or diploma, and 19,290 (29.2%) people exclusively held high school qualifications. The median income was $41,200, compared with $41,500 nationally. 6,933 people (10.5%) earned over $100,000 compared to 12.1% nationally. The employment status of those at least 15 was that 34,935 (52.9%) people were employed full-time, 7,344 (11.1%) were part-time, and 2,433 (3.7%) were unemployed.

== Councillors ==
Whau ward councillor of Auckland
- Incumbent; Sarah Paterson-Hamlin since 2025
- Term length: Three years
- Inaugural holder: Noelene Raffills
- Formation: 1 November 2010
- Website: www.aucklandcouncil.govt.nz

Election	Councillors elected	Affiliation	Votes	Notes
2010	Noelene Raffills	Citizens & Ratepayers	7518	
2013	Ross Clow	Labour	6227	
2016	Ross Clow	Labour	6895	
2019	Tracy Mulholland	Communities and Residents	5853	
2022	Kerrin Leoni	Labour	8373	
2025	Sarah Paterson-Hamlin	Labour	5171	

== Election results ==
Election Results for the Whau Ward:

=== 2025 Election Results ===
	Name	Affiliation	Votes	%
1	Sarah Paterson-Hamlin	Labour	5,171	34.1%
	Craig Lord	Communities and Residents	3,376	22.3%
	Anjana Subramaniam Iyer	Green	1,922	12.7%
	Paul Davie	Voice of the People	1,882	12.4%
	Morgan Luxton		1,301	8.6%
	Bruce Xu	Independent	955	6.3%
Blank			529	0.2%
Informal			30	3.5%
Turnout			15,166	

=== 2022 Election Results ===
	Name	Affiliation	Votes	%
1	Kerrin Leoni	Labour	8,373	46.7%
	Tracy Mulholland	Communities and Residents	8,011	44.6%
Blank			1,552	8.6%
Informal			7	0.04%
Majority			362	2.0%
Turnout			17,943	

=== 2019 Election Results ===
	Name	Affiliation	Votes	%
1	Tracy Mulholland	Communities and Residents	5,853	32.3%
	Ross Clow	Labour	5,663	31.3%
	Jessamine Fraser	Green	2,241	12.4%
	Paul Davie	Community Independents	1,774	9.8%
	Anna Degia-Pala	Independent	1,336	7.4%
Blank			1,168	6.4%
Informal			66	0.4%
Majority			190	1.0%
Turnout			18,101	

=== 2016 Election Results ===
	Name	Affiliation	Votes	%
1	Ross Clow	Labour	6,895	36.1%
	Duncan MacDonald	Community First	3,563	18.7%
	Mark Brickell	Auckland Future	2,929	15.3%
	Anna Degia-Pala	Independent	2,106	11.0%
	Wayne Davis	Shadbolt's Independent	1,195	6.3%
	John Hubscher	United Future	619	3.2%
Blank			1,740	9.1%
Informal			55	0.3%
Majority			3,332	17.4%
Turnout			19,102	
