= Rosebank, Auckland =

Rosebank
- Suburb
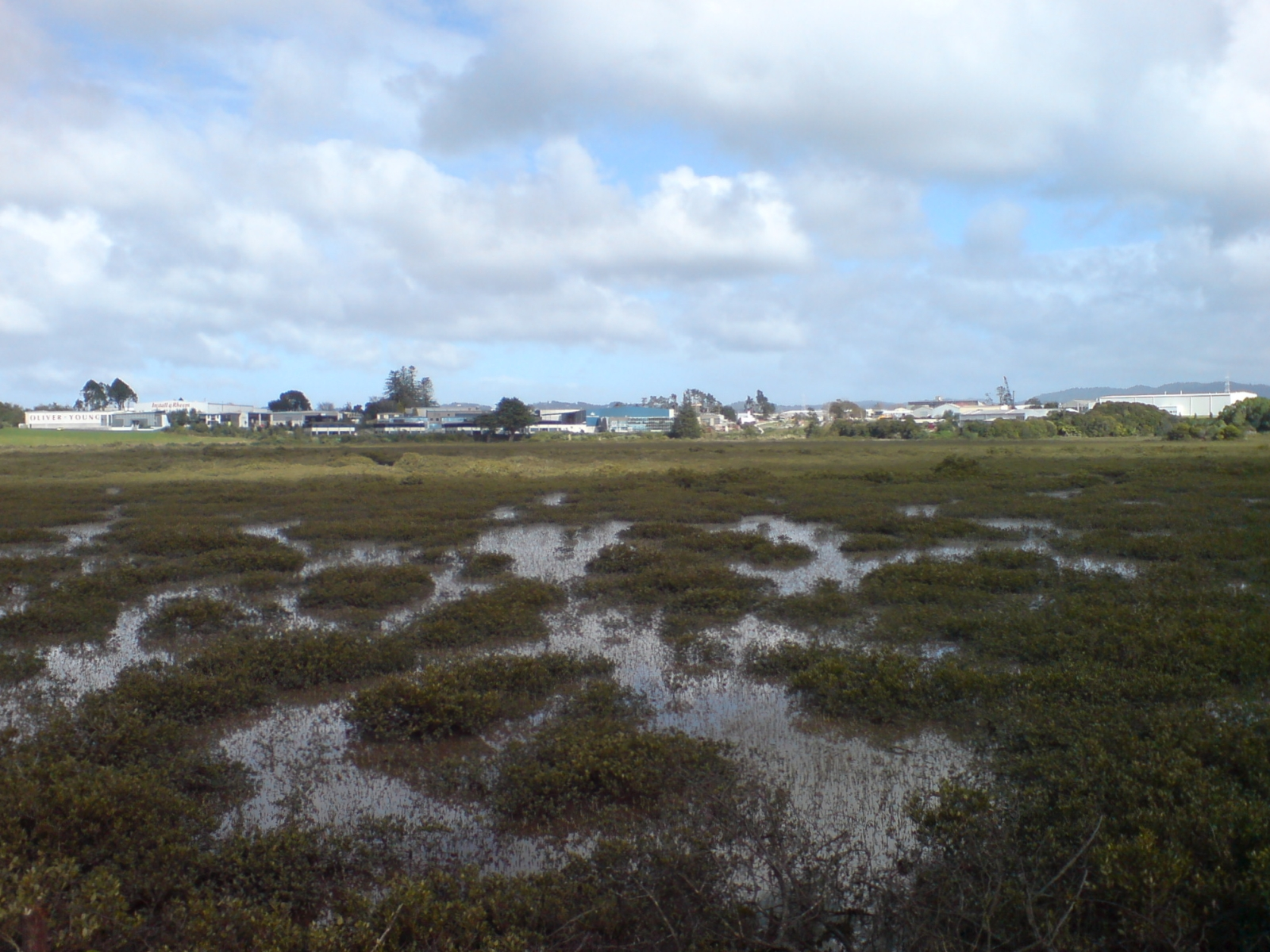
- The suburb seen over the tidal flats surrounding it on most sides
- Interactive map of Rosebank
- Coordinates: 36°52′45″S 174°40′17″E
- Country: New Zealand
- City: Auckland
- Local authority: Auckland Council
- Electoral ward: Whau ward
- Local board: Whau Local Board

Area
  - Land: 237 ha (590 acres)

Population (June 2025)
  - Total: 10
  - Density: 4.2/km^{2} (11/sq mi)

Te Atatū Peninsula	(Waitematā Harbour)	(Waitemata Harbour)
Te Atatū South	Rosebank	Waterview
Glendene	Kelston	Avondale

Rosebank (or the Rosebank Peninsula) is a peninsula and industrial suburb of Auckland, New Zealand. It is the westernmost point of the Auckland isthmus. The peninsula runs from the southeast in a northerly direction, with the Whau River on its west. Pollen Island and Traherne Island lie nearby in the Waitematā Harbour to the north-eastern side of the peninsula. Traherne Island is connected to the peninsula by a causeway that is part of the Northwestern Motorway.

The Northwestern Motorway cuts across the top of the peninsula, with flyover ramps connecting at Rosebank Road and Patiki Road. The Northwestern Cycleway also runs across it, parallel to the motorway.

The suburb is a large employment area mainly composed of industrial (manufacturing, with some office) properties off Rosebank Road (with 813 businesses operating here in 2009). There is one "open space" area, the Rosebank Park Domain in the northwest of the peninsula, almost solely used for go-karting and as a speedway (leased from Council).

The Motu Manawa (Pollen Island) Marine Reserve covers all of the harbour adjacent to the north and east of the peninsula, including Pollen and Traherne Islands.

== History ==
A number of archeological remains exist along the northern part of the peninsula, including old Maori middens, a tramway and remnants of a limeworks and early housing sites. However, most of these have been destroyed by development and past motorway construction.

In 1852, Dr. Daniel Pollen opened the first brickworks in West Auckland, at Rosebank on the shores of the Whau River. Pollen engaged with British potter James Wright to create the first commercial scale crockery kiln in New Zealand at the location. Shells taken from the banks of Motumānawa / Pollen Island were processed at the brickworks, in order to create lime for the brick and concrete industries.

== Demographics ==
Rosebank Peninsula statistical area covers 2.37 km^{2} (0.92 sq mi) and had an estimated population of 10 as of June 2025, with a population density of 4 people per km^{2}.

Historical population
Year	Pop.	±% p.a.
2006	30	—
2013	15	−9.43%
2018	30	+14.87%
2023	9	−21.40%

Rosebank Peninsula had a population of 9 in the 2023 New Zealand census, a decrease of 21 people (−70.0%) since the 2018 census, and a decrease of 6 people (−40.0%) since the 2013 census. There were 3 males and 6 females. The median age was 39.4 years (compared with 38.1 years nationally).

English was spoken by 100.0%. The percentage of people born overseas was 33.3, compared with 28.8% nationally.

The median income was $16,100, compared with $41,500 nationally.

== Panorama ==
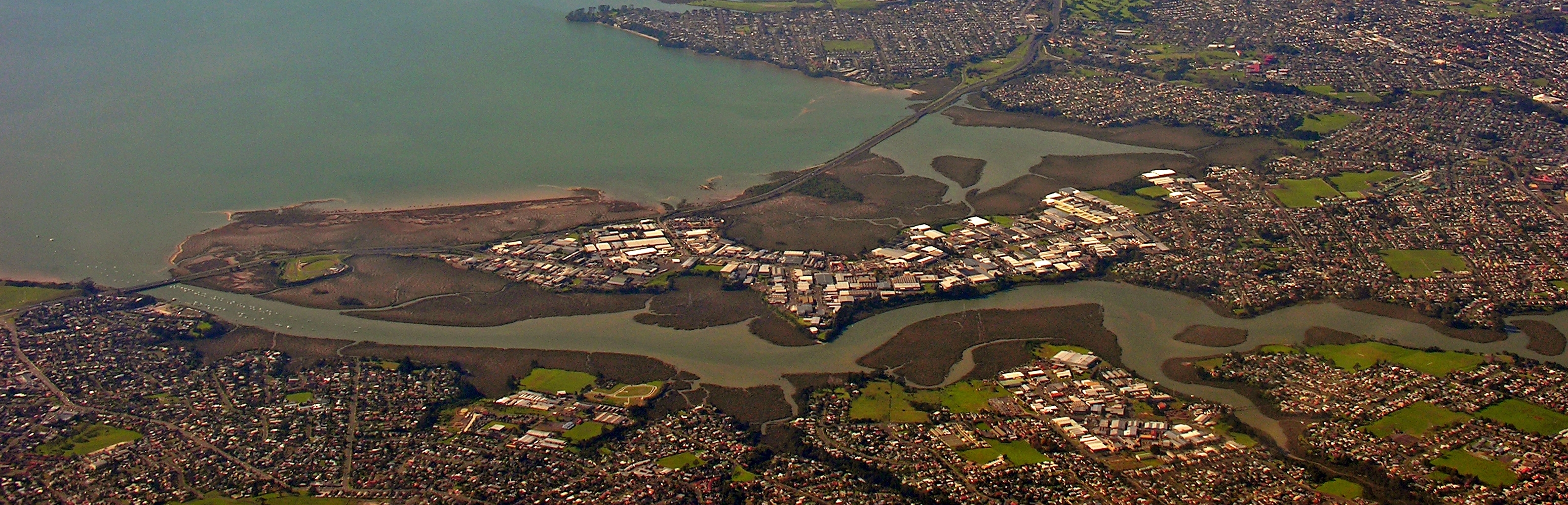
The peninsula from the air, distinct from surrounding suburbs by the mostly white, larger commercial buildings

== Sport ==
Rosebank Speedway is a motorcycle speedway venue located in the Rosebank Park Domain, on the Patiki Road. The track is a significant venue for important speedway events and has held the final of the New Zealand Solo Championship in 2006, 2011, 2013, 2016 and 2019.
