= Traherne Island =

Island in New Zealand

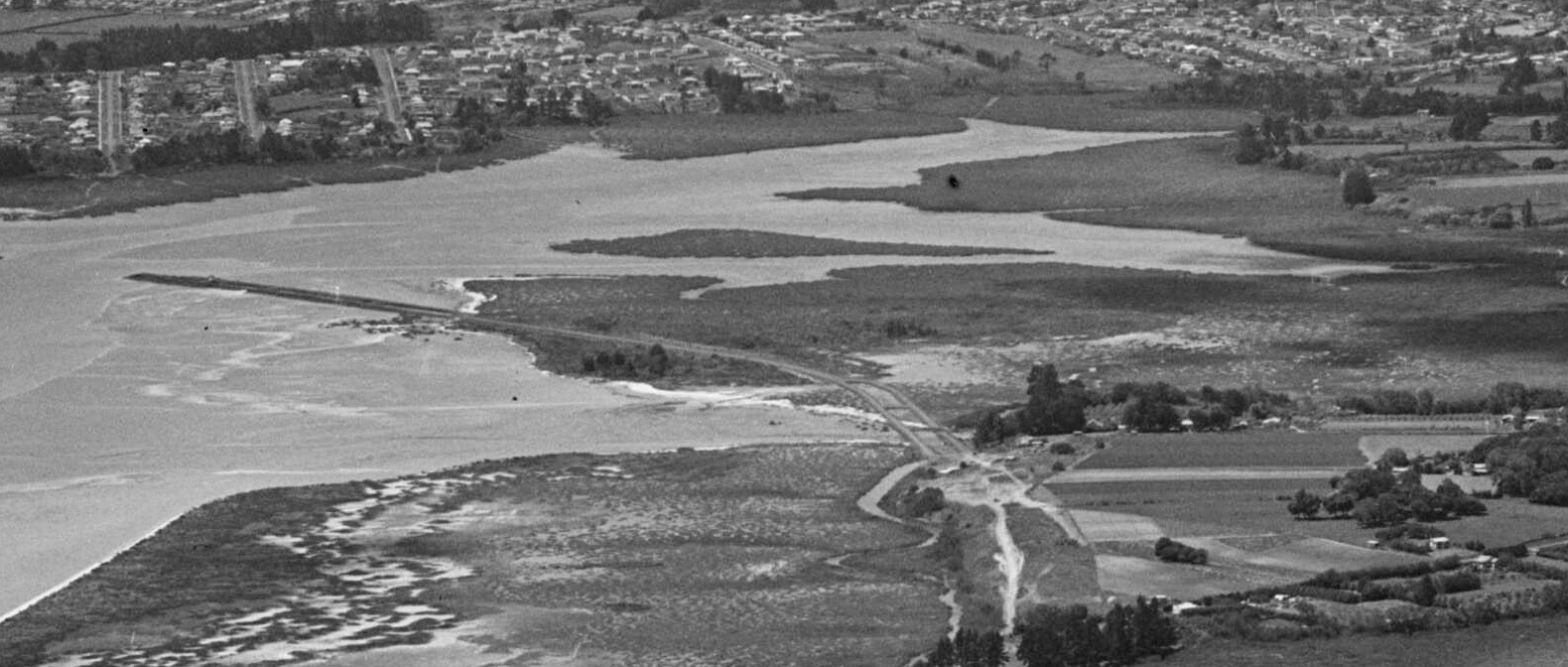
- Traherne Island in 1951, during the early construction of the Northwestern Motorway
- Interactive map of Traherne Island

Geography
- Location: Auckland
- Coordinates: 36°52′19″S 174°40′48″E
- Adjacent to: Waitematā Harbour

Administration
- New Zealand

Traherne Island is a 13 hectares (0.050 sq mi) island in the Waitematā Harbour, very near Rosebank Peninsula, in Auckland, New Zealand. It is one of two islands surrounded by the Motu Manawa (Pollen Island) Marine Reserve, the other being Pollen Island. The 500 hectares (1.9 sq mi) marine reserve was established in 1995.

Traherne Island is owned by the Crown and managed by NZ Transport Agency. The Northwestern Motorway runs along the island and connects it to the mainland by causeways and bridges.

Footprints of banded rail were found on the island in 2010. Surveys have found no archeological sites on the island.
