= Semadeni residence =

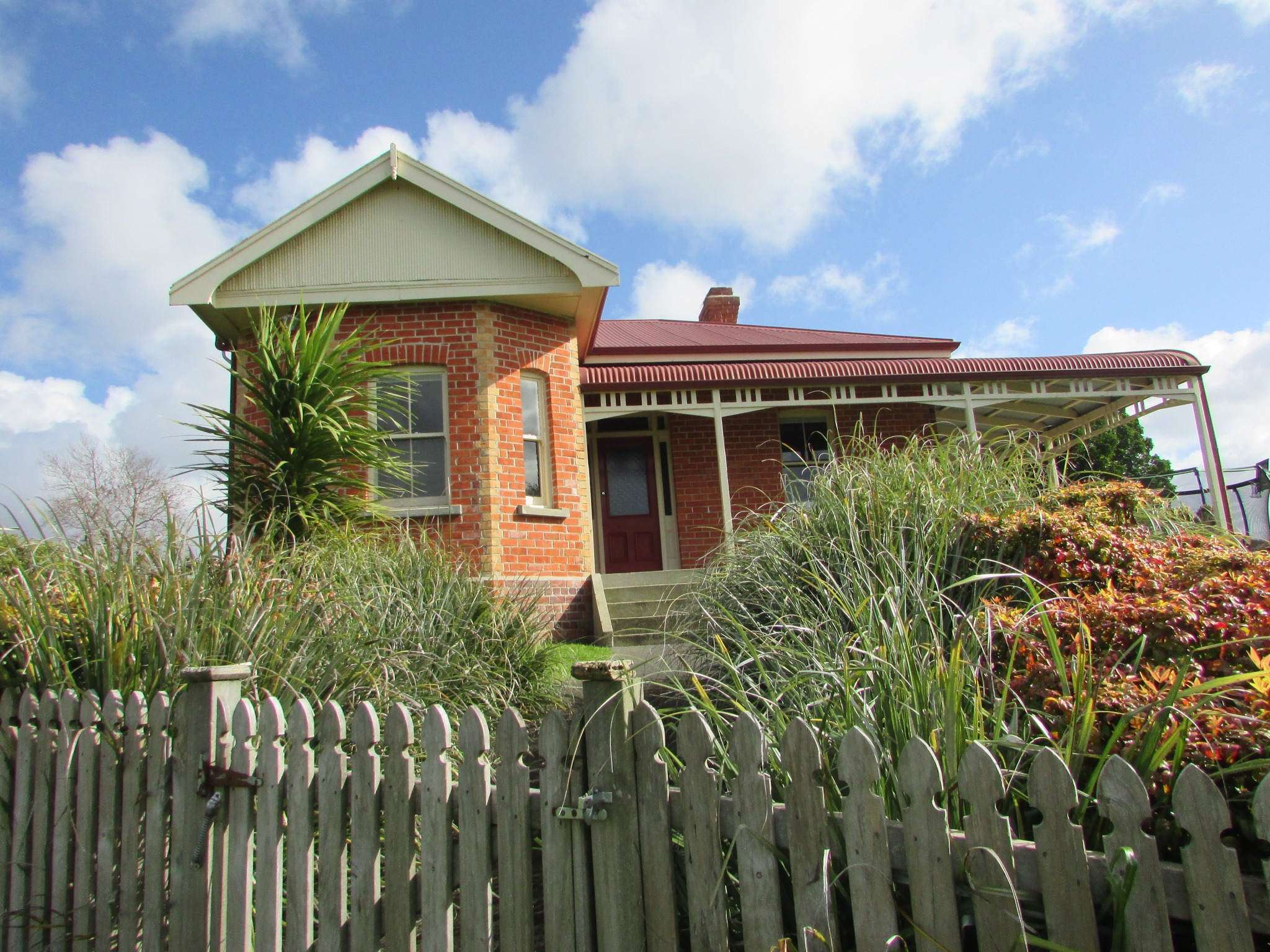
- The front of the Semadeni residence (building is facing south towards the harbour)
- Alternative names: Red Brick Villa

General information
- Status: Occupied by private tenants
- Type: Brick villa
- Architectural style: Edwardian
- Location: 19 Longbush Road, Te Atatu Peninsula
- Coordinates: 36.842°S 174.6575°E
- Named for: Edward Semadeni
- Year built: 1907–1911
- Renovated: 2009–2010
- Owner: Auckland Council

The Semadeni residence, also known as the Red Brick Villa, is a historic Edwardian villa located in Te Atatū Peninsula, Auckland, New Zealand.

The property is the oldest extant building in Te Atatū Peninsula.

== Description ==
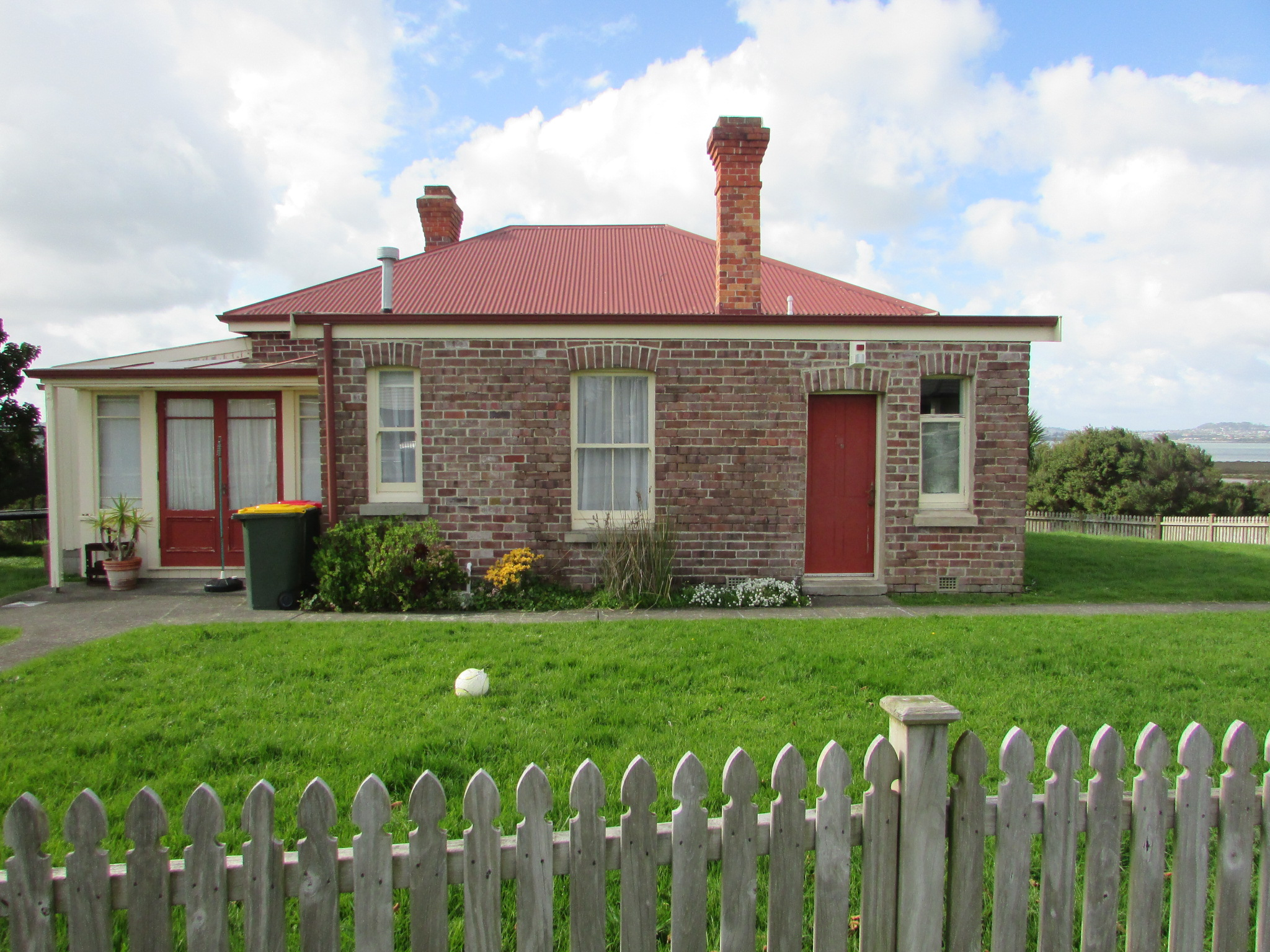
Semadeni residence from the north (building is facing towards the road)

The Semadeni residence is a single story Edwardian bay villa constructed from brick. The windows are timber double-hung sashes and the doors are timber that feature decorative panels. The roof is corrugated iron and mostly pyramidal. A brick lean-to is located on the eastern side and was constructed later. There are two brick chimneys with one being located in the lean-to. The flooring of the house is kauri with the lean-to being floored with black pine.

== History ==
The Melanesian Trust Board sold lot 80 to Donald McLeod after the previous purchaser died without a will. McLeod started construction on a villa in c.1907. In 1910 McLeod sold the incomplete property to Edward Semadeni. McLeod finished construction of the property for Semadeni in 1911. The property was constructed from bricks created at the local brickworks which were at the mouth of the Whau River.

Edward Semadeni was a Methodist whose parents immigrated to New Zealand from Switzerland. He served as a superintendent of the local Methodist Sunday school until his death in 1931.

In 1933 Frederick Smith – who owned the neighbouring lot 81 – purchased lot 80 and property to farm dairy cattle.

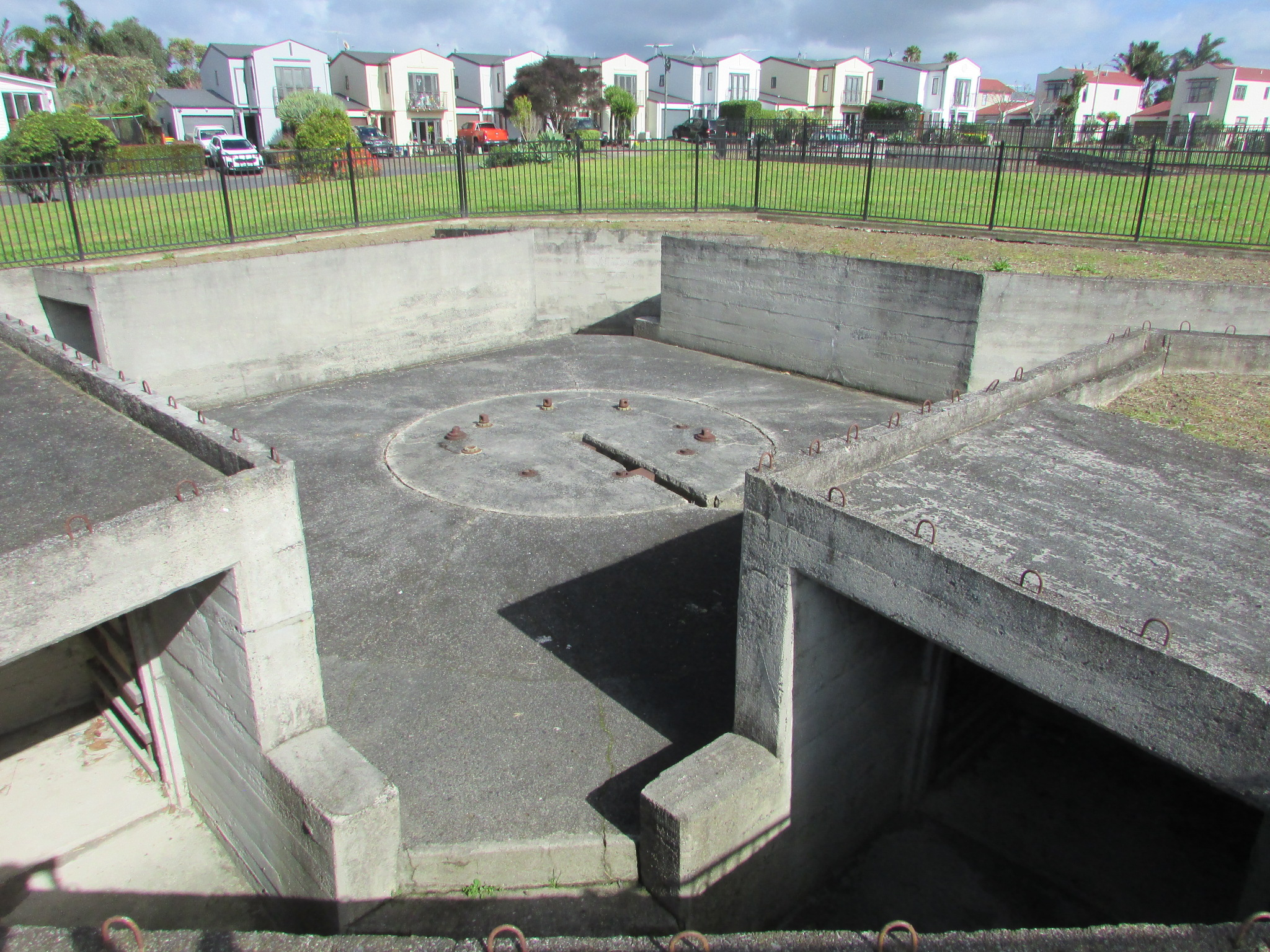
One of the anti-aircraft gun emplacements installed on Smith's land

During the Second World War gun pits were constructed on both of Smith's plots to serve as anti-air defence. In 1946 a wireless receiving station was installed. The New Zealand Broadcasting Service used it until 1971.

The Auckland Harbour Board purchased the land from Smith in 1951 under the Public Works Act. The land was supposed to serve as a new deep water port. The Auckland Harbour Board leased the land to farmers until 1989 when the organisation was dissolved. The land was then transferred to the nascent Waitakere City Council.

Between 1967–1979 the two neighbouring sections would become reserves. In 1999 lot 79 was merged with the Semadeni residence's lot 80 to form the Harbourview–Orangihina reserve.

In 2005 it was planned that the villa be upgraded and turned into an environmental education centre. The Waitakere City Council instead decided on leasing the property to residential tenants in 2009. This led for members of the community to complain due to rate payer funds being used for renovation and repair work on the building.

In 2005 a case in the High Court was filed that land including lot 80 should have been returned to the land owners after the Auckland Harbour Board abandoned the plan for a deep water port. This case was unsuccessful; however, it did retard development of the surrounding reserve until 2016.

Over the years of council ownership the residence was leased to tenants. The council repaired the building in 2009–2010 at a cost of $100,000. Following the restoration it was again leased to tenants.
