= James Wright (potter) =

New Zealand potter

James Wright (1819–1887) was a New Zealand potter. He was born in Fenton, Staffordshire, England in 1819.

== Biography ==
In the 1850s, Wright developed the first commercial-scale crockery kiln in New Zealand, alongside Daniel Pollen at the brickworks at Rosebank on the shores of the Whau River in Auckland.
