= Rangeview Intermediate School =

Rangeview Intermediate
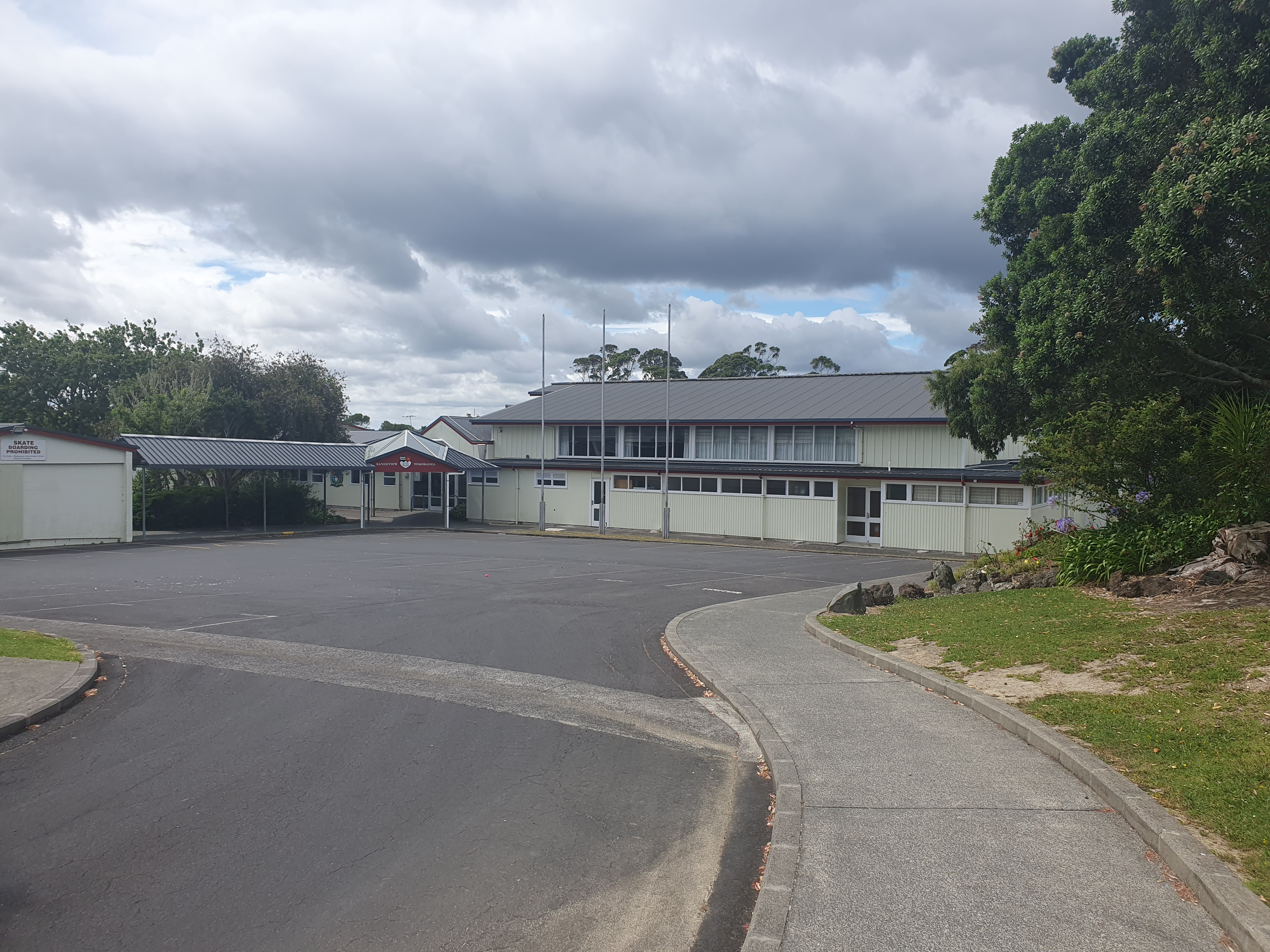

Location
- Keru Place, Te Atatū South; Auckland, New Zealand; 36.8684°S 174.6450°E

Information
- Type: State, Co-educational, Intermediate
- Motto: Wisdom with Truth
- Ministry of Education Institution no.: 1457
- Principal: Jesmond Filipo
- Enrolment: 457 (July 2026)
- Socio-economic decile: 5
- Website: www.rangeview.school.nz

Rangeview Intermediate School is a school in Te Atatū South, West Auckland, New Zealand.
