= Royal Heights =

Suburb of Auckland, New Zealand

- Suburb
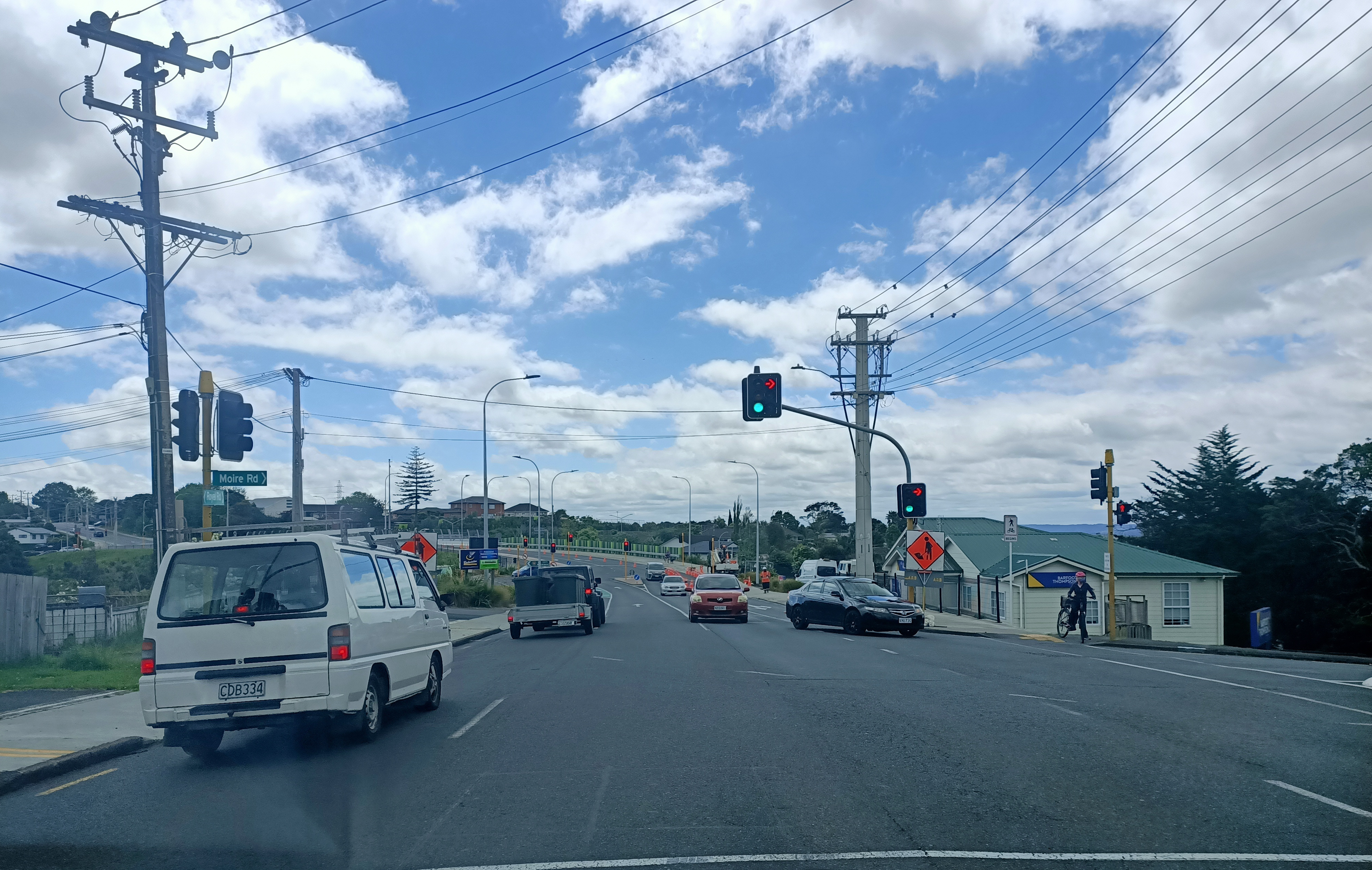
- Intersection of Royal Road and Moire Road in Royal Heights
- Interactive map of Royal Heights
- Coordinates: 36.829°S 174.630°E
- Country: New Zealand
- City: Auckland
- Local authority: Auckland Council
- Electoral ward: Waitākere ward
- Local board: Henderson-Massey

Area
  - Land: 262 ha (650 acres)

Population (June 2025)
  - Total: 8,580
  - Density: 3,270/km^{2} (8,480/sq mi)

Westgate	West Harbour	Hobsonville
Massey	Royal Heights	(Waitematā Harbour)
Massey	Lincoln	Te Atatū Peninsula

Royal Heights is a suburb in West Auckland, under the local governance of Auckland Council.

== Demographics ==
Royal Heights covers 2.62 km^{2} (1.01 sq mi) and had an estimated population of 8,580 as of June 2025, with a population density of 3,275 people per km^{2}.

Historical population
Year	Pop.	±% p.a.
2006	6,465	—
2013	6,768	+0.66%
2018	7,278	+1.46%
2023	7,866	+1.57%

Royal Heights had a population of 7,866 in the 2023 New Zealand census, an increase of 588 people (8.1%) since the 2018 census, and an increase of 1,098 people (16.2%) since the 2013 census. There were 3,930 males, 3,918 females and 18 people of other genders in 2,427 dwellings. 3.3% of people identified as LGBTIQ+. There were 1,620 people (20.6%) aged under 15 years, 1,620 (20.6%) aged 15 to 29, 3,726 (47.4%) aged 30 to 64, and 894 (11.4%) aged 65 or older.

People could identify as more than one ethnicity. The results were 46.7% European (Pākehā); 19.1% Māori; 22.3% Pasifika; 27.3% Asian; 3.6% Middle Eastern, Latin American and African New Zealanders (MELAA); and 1.5% other, which includes people giving their ethnicity as "New Zealander". English was spoken by 91.3%, Māori language by 3.9%, Samoan by 5.3%, and other languages by 26.0%. No language could be spoken by 3.4% (e.g. too young to talk). New Zealand Sign Language was known by 0.4%. The percentage of people born overseas was 37.9%, compared with 28.8% nationally.

Religious affiliations were 37.6% Christian, 2.9% Hindu, 3.7% Islam, 0.9% Māori religious beliefs, 1.5% Buddhist, 0.5% New Age, and 1.4% other religions. People who answered that they had no religion were 45.2%, and 6.4% of people did not answer the census question.

Of those at least 15 years old, 1,464 (23.4%) people had a bachelor's or higher degree, 2,904 (46.5%) had a post-high school certificate or diploma, and 1,869 (29.9%) people exclusively held high school qualifications. 621 people (9.9%) earned over $100,000 compared to 12.1% nationally. The employment status of those at least 15 was that 3,252 (52.1%) people were employed full-time, 729 (11.7%) were part-time, and 261 (4.2%) were unemployed.

Individual statistical areas
Name	Area (km^{2})	Population	Density (per km^{2})	Dwellings	Median age	Median income
Royal Heights North	1.49	4,116	2,762	1,320	34.6 years	$44,600
Royal Heights South	1.13	3,750	3,319	1,107	33.1 years	$39,200
New Zealand					38.1 years	$41,500

== Education ==
Colwill School is a coeducational full primary school (years 1–8), with a roll of 248 students as of July 2025.
