= Daniel Pollen =

Premier of New Zealand from 1875 to 1876

The Honourable Daniel Pollen
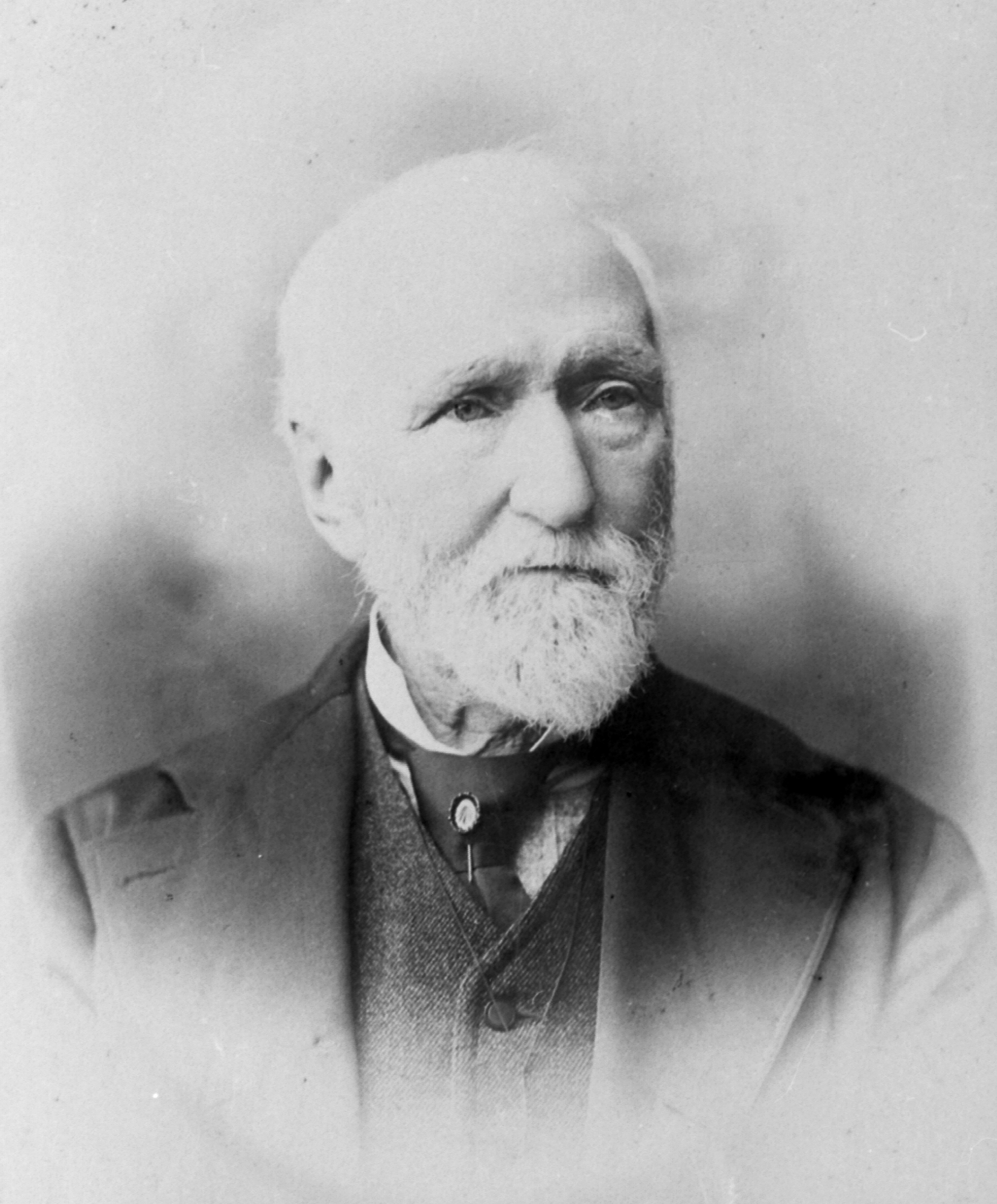
- Pollen, c. 1873

9th Premier of New Zealand
- In office 6 July 1875 – 15 February 1876
- Monarch: Victoria
- Governor: George Phipps
- Preceded by: Julius Vogel
- Succeeded by: Julius Vogel
- Constituency: Legislative Council member

Personal details
- Born: 2 June 1813 Ringsend, Dublin, Ireland
- Died: 18 May 1896 (aged 82)
- Party: None
- Spouse: Jane Henderson (m. 1846)
- Children: 8
- Parent(s): Hugh Pollen; Elizabeth O'Neill

Daniel Pollen (2 June 1813 – 18 May 1896) was an Irish-New Zealand politician who became the ninth premier of New Zealand, serving from 6 July 1875 to 15 February 1876.

== Early life ==
The son of Hugh Pollen, a dock master, Pollen was born in Ringsend, Dublin. Little is known about the early part of his life, but it is supposed that he grew up in Ireland and in the United States of America. However, his father was dock master of the Grand Canal Company at Ringsend in 1812, still held that office in 1832, and died in 1837 to be succeeded as dock master by Thomas Pollen. On some accounts, Pollen's father helped to build the United States Capitol.

A doctor, Pollen claimed to hold the MD degree, although where he graduated is not recorded. He travelled to New South Wales in the late 1830s, and moved to North Auckland in January 1840. He was a witness to the proceedings of the Treaty of Waitangi. He began his practice as a doctor in Parnell, Auckland, in 1841. In 1844 he was appointed as a coroner and held this post for four years.

On 18 May 1846, Pollen married Jane Henderson, the daughter of an officer of the Royal Navy (Lieutenant Essex, RN, of Demerara). He moved with her to Kawau Island in 1847, after becoming medical officer to a Scottish copper-mining company.

In 1852, Pollen opened the first brickworks in West Auckland, at Rosebank on the shores of the Whau River. Together with British potter James Wright, Pollen created the first commercial scale crockery kiln in New Zealand here.

== Entry into politics ==
Pollen spent several years on Kawau, during which time he began to contribute articles to The New Zealander supporting the agitation for responsible government. He was also to the fore in supporting temperance, scientific, and library movements there.

=== Auckland Province ===
When the New Zealand Constitution Act 1852 became law, Pollen was made chief clerk in the Auckland Superintendent's office. From there, he rose through the ranks. Two years after his original appointment, he was appointed to the Executive Council, and in 1858 he was appointed Commissioner of Crown Lands for Auckland. In 1856 he was elected to the Auckland Provincial Council for the Suburbs of Auckland electorate, where he served until 1861. From 1862 to 1865, he represented the Auckland East electorate on the council.

He was one of four candidates in the Suburbs of Auckland electorate in the 1855 general election. He came last in this election.

On 16 July 1861, he was appointed to the New Zealand Legislative Council. In 1862, he resigned as Commissioner of Crown Lands, and became the Deputy Superintendent of Auckland, where he served until the end of his second term. He resigned from the Legislative Council on 4 December 1867 to become agent for the Central Government at Auckland.

He returned to the Legislative Council on 10 June 1868 to represent the Stafford Ministry. He resigned from the Legislative Council in 1870 to be agent in Auckland again.

In 1870, Daniel Pollen held four positions – Receiver of Land Revenue, Commissioner of Confiscated Lands, Commissioner under the Native Land Act of 1870, and Immigration Officer.

In 1870, Pollen purchased land on the South Kaipara Head, which over 130 years later was developed into the Te Rau Pūriri Regional Park.

=== Premier of New Zealand ===
The Vogel Ministry recalled him to the Legislative Council on 12 May 1873, where he became colonial secretary on 4 July 1873. He held this role until 13 October 1877 during various ministries. He became Premier on 6 July 1875 and led the Pollen Ministry until 15 February 1876. After he left this position, he was again appointed to the Legislative Council on 12 May 1873 and served for 23 years until his death on 18 May 1896.

== See also ==
- Pollen Island

== Notes ==
Government offices
Preceded by Julius Vogel	Premier of New Zealand; 1876	Succeeded by Julius Vogel
