= Te Atatū Peninsula =

- Suburb
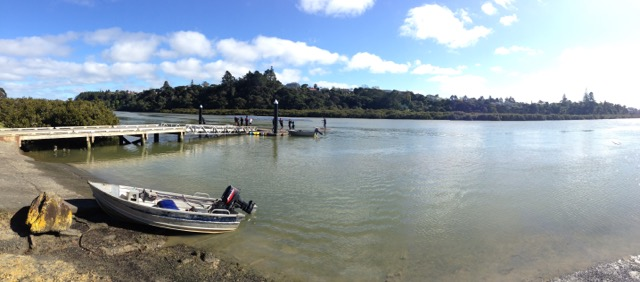
- Taipari Strand, Te Atatū Peninsula
- Interactive map of Te Atatū Peninsula
- Coordinates: 36°50′28″S 174°39′07″E
- Country: New Zealand
- City: Auckland
- Local authority: Auckland Council
- Electoral ward: Waitākere ward
- Local board: Henderson-Massey Local Board

Area
  - Land: 546 ha (1,350 acres)

Population (June 2025)
  - Total: 15,790
  - Density: 2,890/km^{2} (7,490/sq mi)

Royal Heights		(Waitematā Harbour)
Massey	Te Atatū Peninsula	(Whau River)
Lincoln	Te Atatū South

Te Atatū Peninsula (formerly Te Atatu North, also known in Māori as Ōrukuwai) is a waterfront suburb of West Auckland surrounded by the Waitematā Harbour. The area was home to brickworks and farmland until the Northwestern Motorway was constructed in the 1950s, after which Te Atatū developed a low and medium-cost suburb. The area south of the motorway became known as Te Atatū South. The Auckland Harbour Board intended to develop a port on the peninsula for much of the 20th century. After plans for this were abandoned, the land was redeveloped into Footrot Flats Fun Park, an amusement park which operated in the 1980s. During the late 2010s, large-scale housing intensification led to the population of Te Atatū greatly expanding.

== Geography and geological history ==
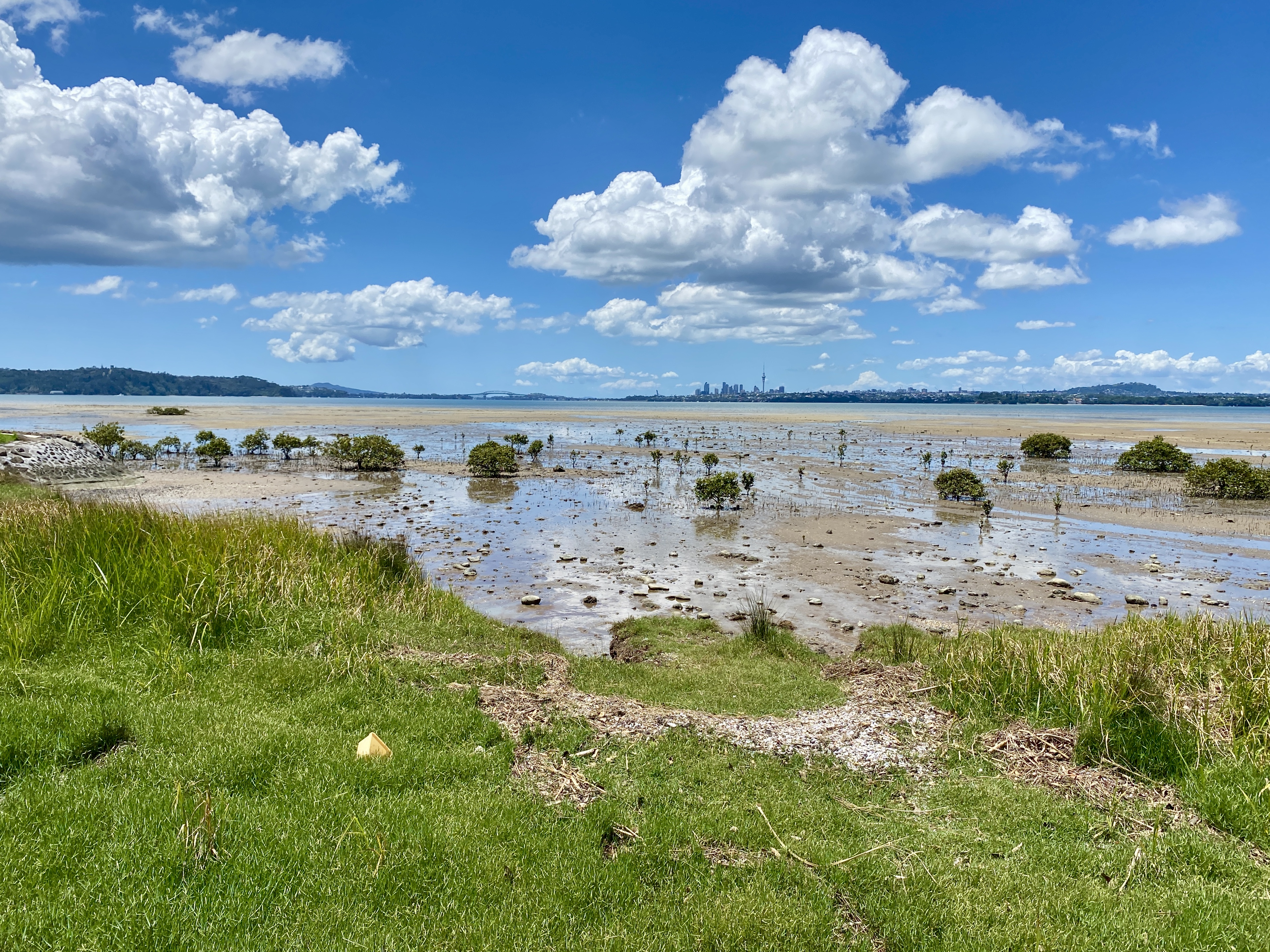
A beach in Te Atatū Peninsula overlooking the Auckland isthmus and skyline

The Te Atatū Peninsula is approximately four kilometres in length and two kilometres in width, and is surrounded by the Waitematā Harbour. The peninsula is composed of Waitemata Sandstone, which formed on the ocean floor 20 million years ago, overlaid with alluvial soil from ancient waterways. The peninsula is bound on the west by the Te Wai-o-Pareira / Henderson Creek and to the east by the Whau River, both of which are drowned valleys. During the Last Glacial Period approximately 17,000 years ago, sea levels were significantly lower, and the peninsula was a highland above the Waitematā river valley. The modern peninsula formed approximately 6,500 years ago, when sea levels rose and the Waitematā river valley drowned and became a harbour.

The peninsula is located in the Tāmaki Ecological District. Within this, the majority of the peninsula is a part of the Warm Lowlands Ecosystem, which was originally dominated by a forest of kauri, rimu, rātā, kahikatea and rewarewa trees. The northern end of the peninsula, and the south-western area adjacent to Te Wai-o-Pareira / Henderson Creek has a Harbour Coastline Ecosystem, which was originally a diverse lowland forest, including trees such as pōhutukawa, pūriri, nīkau palms, mamangi and kōwhai.

The saltmarsh on the eastern side of the peninsula is an ecologically significant area for native plant life and bird species, and links to the Motu Manawa (Pollen Island) Marine Reserve to the south-east.

== History ==
=== Early history ===
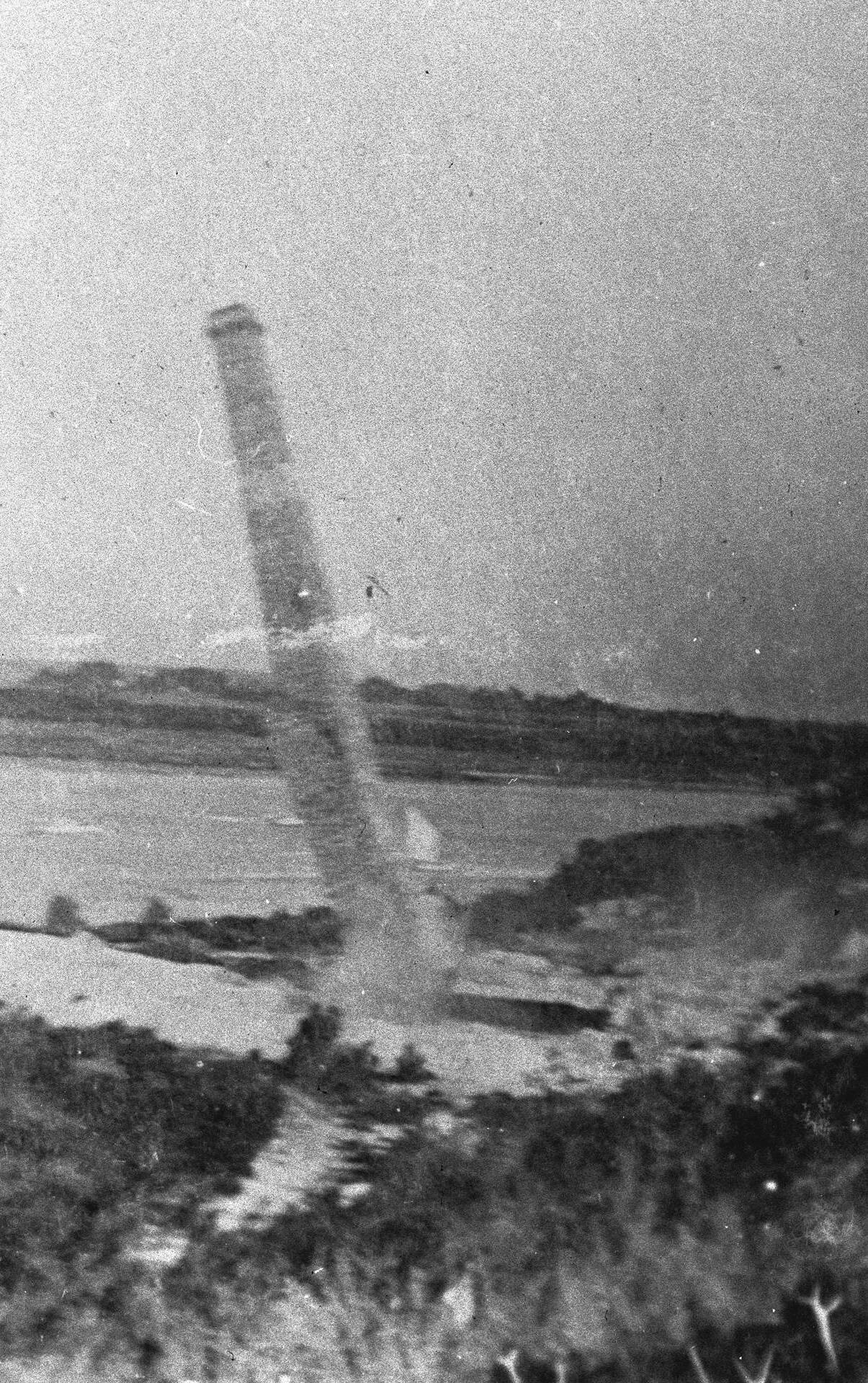
The destruction of the Henderson Brick and Tile Syndicate chimney in 1920

The peninsula is in the traditional rohe of Te Kawerau ā Maki, and has traditional significance to Ngāti Whātua Ōrākei. During pre-European times, there were two Te Kawerau ā Maki kāinga at the mouth of Te Wai-o-Pareira / Henderson Creek on the peninsula, known as Ōrukuwai and Ōrangihina, named after ancestors Rukuwai and Rangihina. Rangihina was the wife of Te Au o Te Whenua, a prominent paramount chief of Te Kawerau ā Maki. To the south-east of the peninsula is Te Tōanga Waka, the Whau River portage, which allowed canoes to pass between the Waitematā Harbour and the Manukau Harbour.

Thomas Henderson, a Scottish immigrant who purchased land from Ngati Whatua in 1844, and established a timber mill on the banks of Te Wai-o-Pareira / Henderson Creek circa 1847 (at the modern suburb of Henderson) to process kauri logs. Te Atatū Peninsula was known as Henderson Point during this period.

In the 1880s, Te Atatū Peninsula was cleared of vegetation, and developed into farmland. The north-western side of the peninsula was a site where Māori farmers grew potatoes, kūmara (sweet potatoes), and dug for kauri gum during the 19th century. The rua (storage pits) made by the farmers for potatoes gave rise to the name "The Pits", a colloquial name given to the peninsula by European settlers.

On 12 March 1894, Henderson Point was subdivided and sold as the Henderson Mill Estate. Many of the purchasers of the land parcels were the Māori families who had lived in the area. In the early 1900s, the area was renamed Te Atatū ("the dawn") by Reverend Thomas Jackson Bennett (father of Frederick Bennett), referencing the morning sunrise views of the Waitematā Harbour seen from the peninsula. In the late 19th and early 20th centuries, Te Atatū was the location of two brick and pottery yards adjacent to Te Wai-o-Pareira / Henderson Creek and one on the Whau River, however the major brick industries in West Auckland were located to the south, closer to New Lynn. The Henderson Brick and Tile Syndicate operated between 1903 and 1912 at end of Wharf Road, and produced distinctive bricks with backwards "S" design. The other brickworks on the peninsula were Hartshorn Brickworks (1895–1917) and the Auckland Brick and Tile Company on the Whau River (1884–1886).

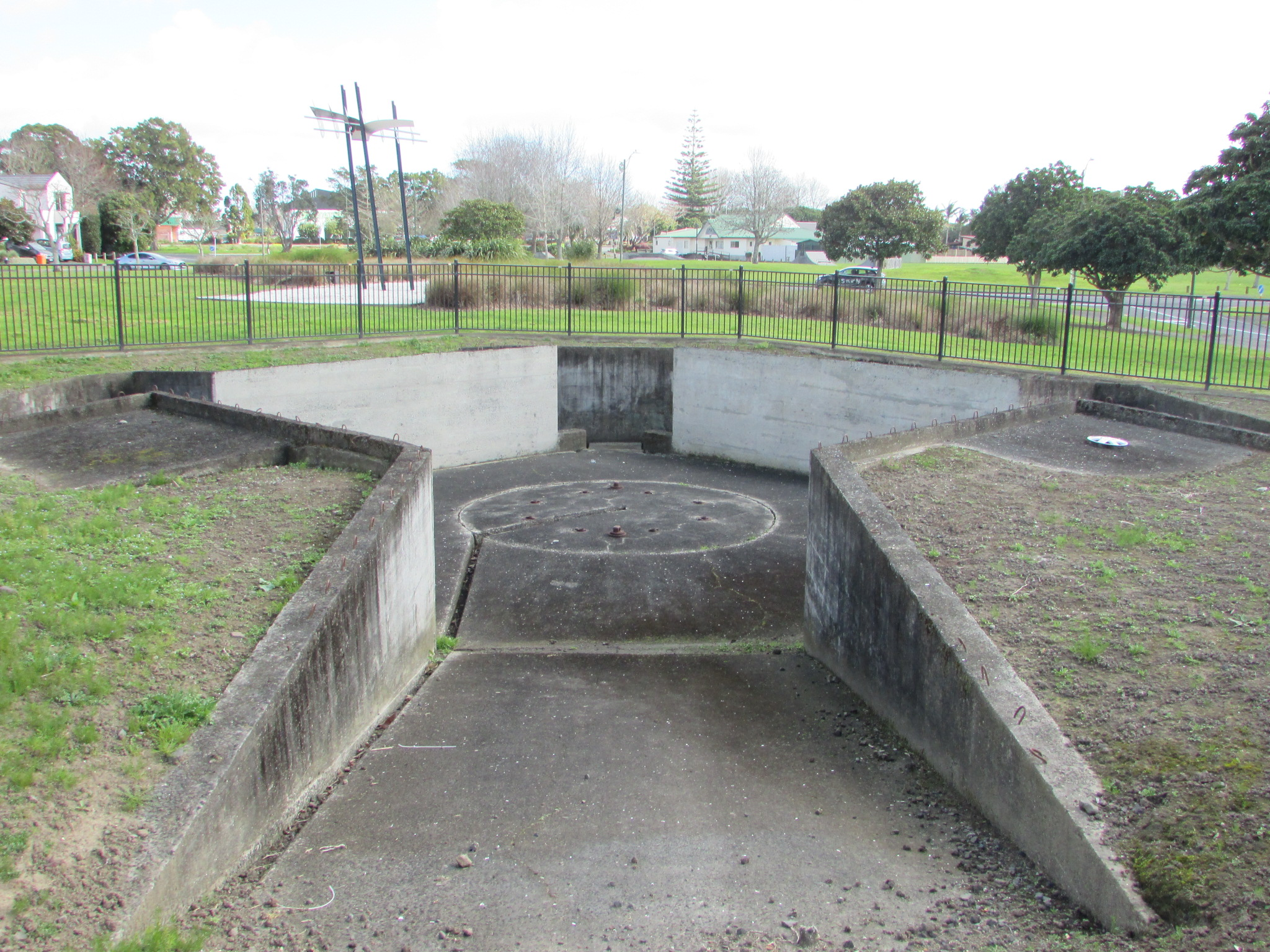
An emplacement installed during WW2

After the closure of the brickworks, the peninsula was primarily used as farmland, producing dairy, pigs, poultry and fruit from small orchards for the city of Auckland. During World War II, gun emplacements were installed on the eastern side of the peninsula, to protect the RNZAF Base Auckland at Hobsonville from attack.

=== Ports and suburban development ===
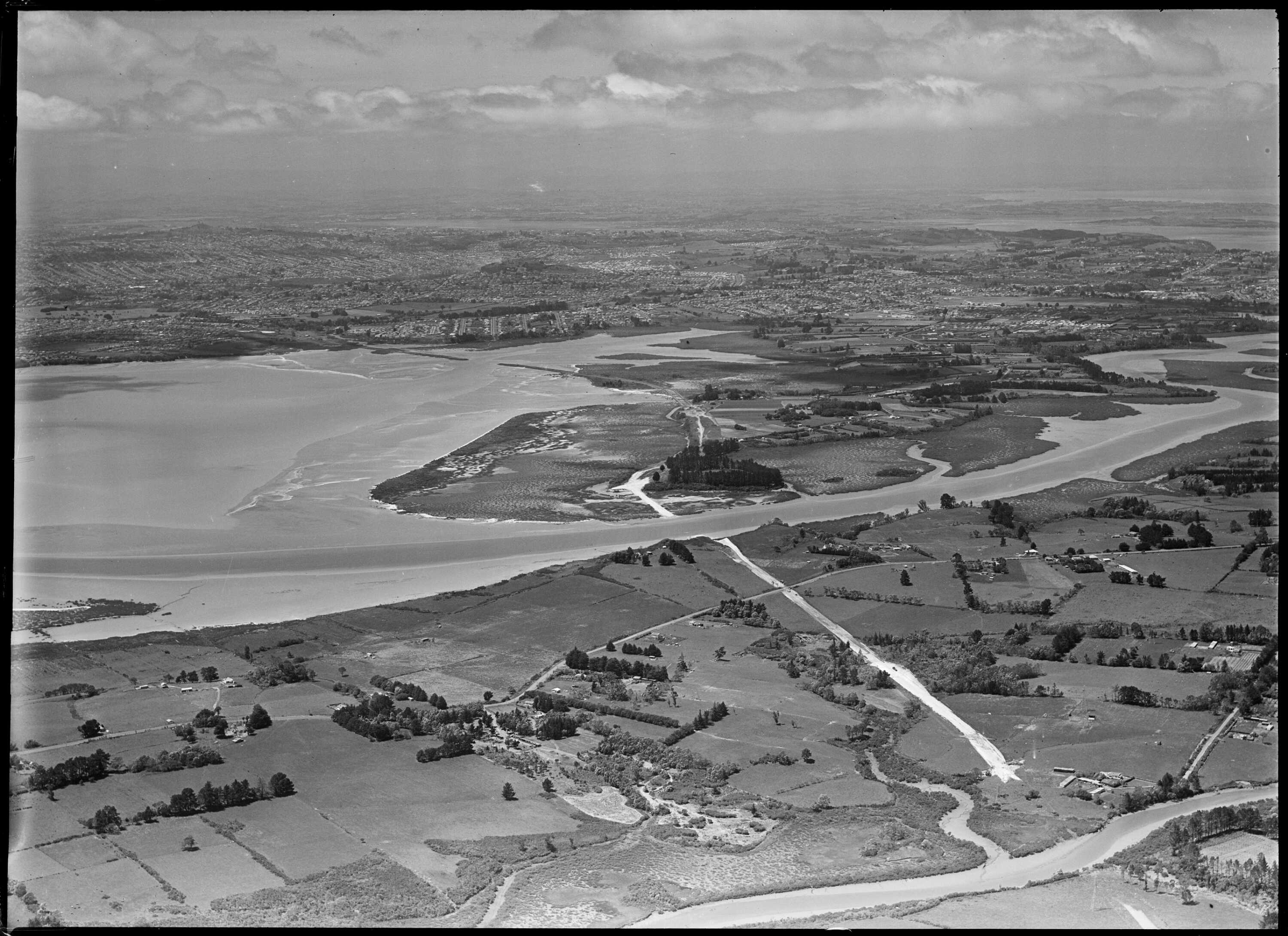
Aerial view of Te Atatū in 1951, prior to the construction of the Northwestern Motorway

During the 1940s, the Auckland Harbour Board proposed that a new port be constructed in the central Waitematā Harbour, to relieve pressure from the Port of Auckland. In the early 1950s under the Public Works Act, the board acquired Motumānawa / Pollen Island, and 162 hectares of eastern Te Atatū. During the same period, the construction of the Northwestern Motorway led to suburban development of the peninsula, beginning with the Ramlea Park Estate, which was constructed in the early 1950s on the former farm of John Thomas. The motorway split the peninsula into two areas: Te Atatū North (now known as Te Atatū Peninsula) and Te Atatū South.

The population of the area boomed, as the area was seen as inexpensive and accessible to the rest of Auckland. The peninsula was split into two major areas: the west, which became suburban housing, and the east, which was land earmarked for industrial land and the development of the port. Between 1945 and 1960, Te Atatū was the second fastest growing area in Auckland. During this period, the area gained the nickname Nappy Valley, referring to the large number of young families who settled in the area. The new working class suburb was a popular place for Urban Māori, Pākehā and Pasifika families, however the area had poor infrastructure to serve the area's new inhabitants. Low and medium-income housing continued to be built on the peninsula during the 1960s and 1970s.

In the late 1960s, Te Atatū Peninsula was the proposed site for Auckland Thermal No. 1, a large gas-fired power plant that was intended to make the Auckland power grid more resilient. There was wide-scale opposition to the plan, with over 1,000 people present at a meeting at Te Atatū Intermediate School in 1973, after which Prime Minister Norman Kirk announced that the project would be abandoned.

=== Amusement park ===
In the early 1980s, the Auckland Harbour Board abandoned its plans for a port or industrial park on the peninsula. This was formalised by an act of parliament, the Auckland Harbour Board and Waitemata City Council (Te Atatu) Empowering Act 1983, which freed up use of the land for non-industrial purposes. In 1982, Leisureland (later known as the Footrot Flats Fun Park) opened, alongside other ventures such as the Te Atatu Grand Prix Minicar Park. The mayor of Waitemata City, Tim Shadbolt, was a fan of the complex, and wanted the Waitemata City Council to further develop the peninsula into a major entertainment district in order to attract more rates for the council. This scheme included conference centres and Kiwidome, a proposed stadium adjacent to Te Wai-o-Pareira / Henderson Creek. Due to financial difficulties, the park stopped operating in 1989, and was formally shut down by the Waitakere City Council in 1991.

The name "Te Atatū Peninsula" was officially adopted by the New Zealand Geographic Board on 5 May 1994, and was formally adopted by the Waitakere Council in 1997. "Te Atatu North" is still commonly used, particularly by older generations.

=== Intensification and developments ===
Te Atatū Peninsula saw a second major period of growth during the late 2010s, after changes to the Auckland Unitary Plan led to major intensive townhouse developments in the suburb. In 2024, construction will begin on the Te Atatū busway station, a planned stop on the Northwestern Busway, connecting Westgate to the Auckland City Centre along the Northwestern Motorway. An urban marae is planned to be developed at the Harbourview-Orangihina Park. The Auckland Council plans to revegetate the Harbourview-Orangihina Park with native plants, and to create a network of walking and cycling paths along the western shores of the Whau River.

== Demographics ==
Te Atatū Peninsula covers 5.46 km^{2} (2.11 sq mi) and had an estimated population of 15,790 as of June 2025, with a population density of 2,892 people per km^{2}.

Historical population
Year	Pop.	±% p.a.
2006	11,688	—
2013	12,486	+0.95%
2018	13,344	+1.34%
2023	14,454	+1.61%

Te Atatū Peninsula had a population of 14,454 in the 2023 New Zealand census, an increase of 1,110 people (8.3%) since the 2018 census, and an increase of 1,968 people (15.8%) since the 2013 census. There were 7,017 males, 7,395 females and 39 people of other genders in 4,878 dwellings. 3.4% of people identified as LGBTIQ+. The median age was 35.2 years (compared with 38.1 years nationally). There were 3,201 people (22.1%) aged under 15 years, 2,676 (18.5%) aged 15 to 29, 6,987 (48.3%) aged 30 to 64, and 1,587 (11.0%) aged 65 or older.

People could identify as more than one ethnicity. The results were 61.0% European (Pākehā); 21.1% Māori; 17.1% Pasifika; 20.3% Asian; 2.3% Middle Eastern, Latin American and African New Zealanders (MELAA); and 2.1% other, which includes people giving their ethnicity as "New Zealander". English was spoken by 94.3%, Māori language by 5.2%, Samoan by 3.7%, and other languages by 21.3%. No language could be spoken by 2.5% (e.g. too young to talk). New Zealand Sign Language was known by 0.5%. The percentage of people born overseas was 30.4, compared with 28.8% nationally.

Religious affiliations were 30.2% Christian, 2.9% Hindu, 1.9% Islam, 1.3% Māori religious beliefs, 1.7% Buddhist, 0.4% New Age, and 1.2% other religions. People who answered that they had no religion were 54.3%, and 6.3% of people did not answer the census question.

Of those at least 15 years old, 3,573 (31.8%) people had a bachelor's or higher degree, 5,100 (45.3%) had a post-high school certificate or diploma, and 2,586 (23.0%) people exclusively held high school qualifications. The median income was $49,600, compared with $41,500 nationally. 1,905 people (16.9%) earned over $100,000 compared to 12.1% nationally. The employment status of those at least 15 was that 6,387 (56.8%) people were employed full-time, 1,353 (12.0%) were part-time, and 363 (3.2%) were unemployed.

Individual statistical areas
Name	Area (km^{2})	Population	Density (per km^{2})	Dwellings	Median age	Median income
Te Atatū Peninsula North West	1.11	3,588	3,323	1,263	34.1 years	$53,000
Te Atatū Peninsula Central	1.11	3,738	3,368	1,224	34.2 years	$47,700
Te Atatū Peninsula West	1.43	4,155	2,906	1,422	33.9 years	$51,800
Te Atatū Peninsula East	1.81	2,970	1,641	969	41.7 years	$43,600
New Zealand					38.1 years	$41,500

== Schools ==
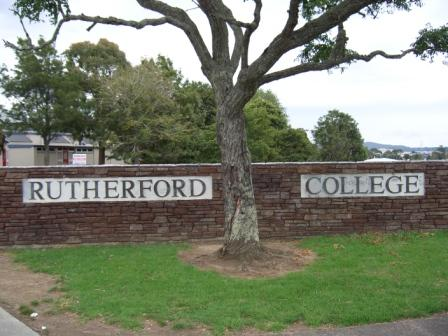
Rutherford College main gate

Rutherford College, named after Ernest Rutherford, is a secondary (years 9–13) school with a roll of 1,607 students. Te Atatū Intermediate School is for years 7–8, and has a roll of 418 students.

Peninsula Primary School, Matipo Primary School and Rutherford Primary School are contributing schools (years 1–6) with rolls of 434, 438 and 298 respectively.

All schools are coeducational. Rolls are as of July 2026.

== Parks and reserves ==
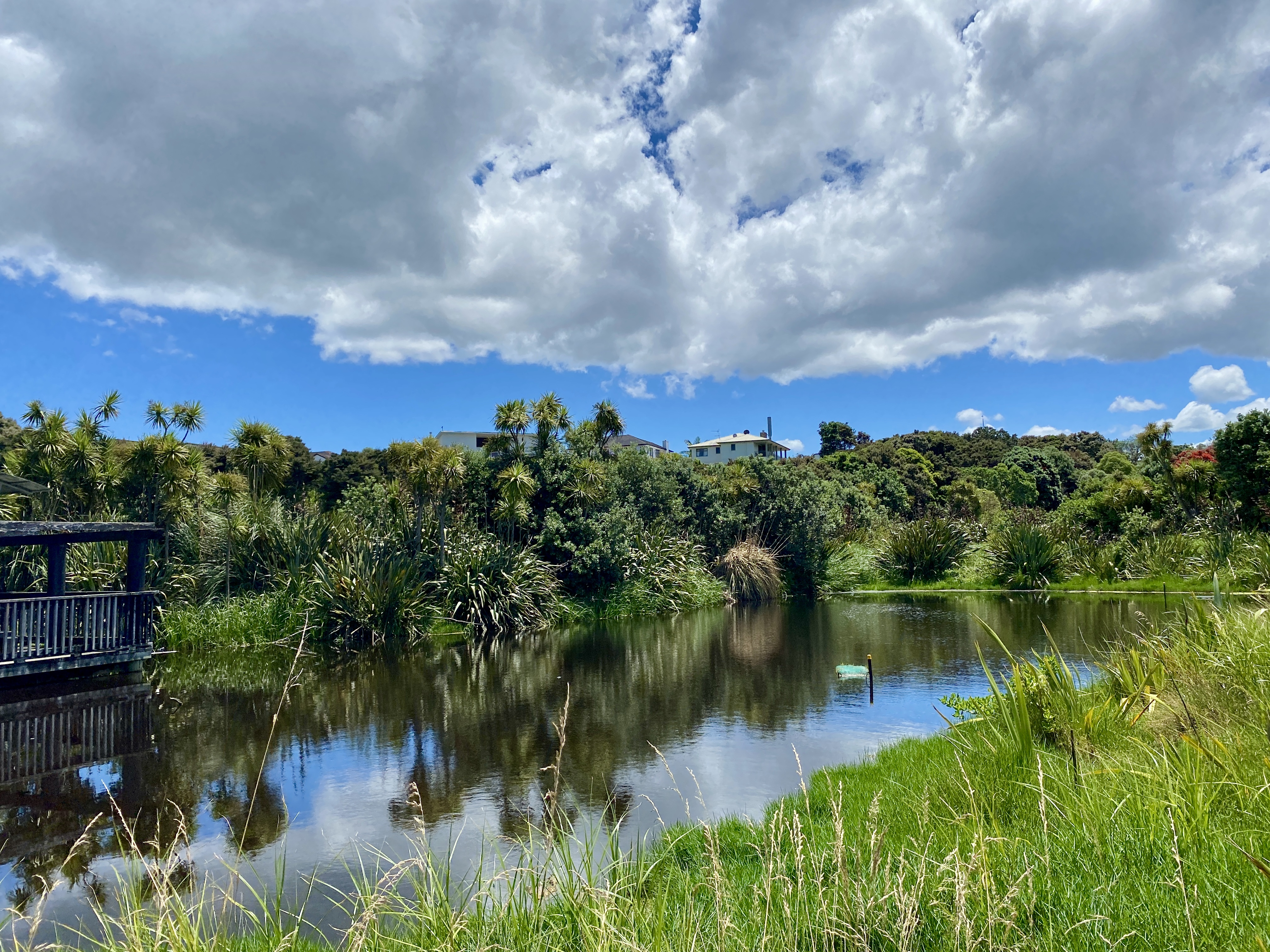
Harbour View Beach Reserve

Harbourview-Orangihina Park is an 85 hectare reserve along the coast of the Te Atatu Peninsula. The reserve includes anti-aircraft gun emplacement constructed in 1943 over fears of Japanese invasion during World War II. Part of the park is leased by the Te Atatu Pony Club. The reserve also contains the Semadeni residence, the oldest extant building of Te Atatu Peninsula. In 2024 the local board approved a lease of 2.5 hectares of the park for a controversial development involving houses, a Marae, and other buildings. The pony club will be required to surrender land for this development.

There are also a number of inland parks, the largest of which is Te Atatū Peninsula Park, a large playing field surrounded by a cycleway.

== Sports ==
Te Atatū is home to several sports clubs. Perhaps the most successful is the Te Atatu Roosters rugby league team who were national champions in 1988. They are based at Jack Colvin Park. Other teams who play in the Te Atatū area are the Te Atatū Tennis Club, Waitakere Cricket Club, Waitakere rugby union club, Waitemata Football Club, Te Atatu AFC, West City Baseball Club, Te Atatū softball club, Waitemata Rowing Club, and Te Atatū Boating Club.

== Local government ==
From 1876 until 1974, Te Atatū Peninsula was administered by the Waitemata County, a large rural county north and west of the city of Auckland. In 1974, Swanson became a part of the Waitemata City, an area which covered most of West Auckland, excluding the boroughs of Henderson, Glen Eden and New Lynn. With the 1989 local government reforms, the Waitemata City merged with these boroughs to form Waitakere City, and in November 2010, all cities and districts of the Auckland Region were amalgamated into a single body, governed by the Auckland Council.

Te Atatū Peninsula is in the Henderson-Massey local board area. The residents of Henderson-Massey elect a local board, and two councillors from the Waitākere ward to sit on the Auckland Council.

== Bibliography ==
- Cole, Grant (2015). "Peninsular Dreams". Te Atatu Me: Photographs of an Urban New Zealand Village. Auckland, New Zealand: Turner PhotoBooks and PhotoForum Inc. pp. 152–171. ISBN 978-0-9597818-7-8.
- Flude, Anthony G. (2008). Henderson's Mill: a history of Henderson 1849-1939. West Auckland Historical Society. ISBN 9781877431210.
- Reidy, Jade (2009). "How the West Was Run". In Macdonald, Finlay; Kerr, Ruth (eds.). West: The History of Waitakere. Random House. pp. 237–256. ISBN 9781869790080.
