= 1875–1876 Pollen ministry =

Former government of New Zealand

The Pollen ministry was a responsible government which held power in New Zealand from July 1875 to February 1876 while Julius Vogel was in London.

== Background ==
Julius Vogel, who had been Premier since 1873 and Colonial Treasurer for almost all of the time since 1869, went to London in July 1875 to negotiate a £4 million loan to be spent on public works and immigration, leaving Daniel Pollen in charge. Harry Atkinson became Treasurer in the interim and his cautious policy was to cease announcing new railway projects and stop servicing interest payments out of loan money.

In 1875 Sir George Grey launched a campaign against the sale of the Piako Swamp to a syndicate led by Bank of New Zealand founder Thomas Russell. This low-value land had been confiscated from its Maori owners during the New Zealand Wars and should have been auctioned off – in fact it was sold directly to the syndicate for 5 shillings per acre on condition that they build a road through it. Pollen, in his former role as Commissioner of Confiscated Lands, had been deeply involved in the sale.

Grey had been the governor of New Zealand in the 1850s and had designed the provinces of New Zealand. He led the provincialist faction in the House and forced the Government to compromise on their intention to abolish the provinces: implementation of the abolition would have to wait until after a general election. Pollen won this election in Vogel's absence, and handed back the premiership upon his return.

== Ministers ==
The following members served in the Pollen ministry:

Name	Portrait	Office	Term
Daniel Pollen, MLC		Premier	6 July 1875 – 15 February 1876
Daniel Pollen, MLC		Colonial Secretary	4 July 1873 – 13 October 1877
Sir Julius Vogel		Colonial Treasurer	11 October 1872 – 6 July 1875
Sir Julius Vogel		Postmaster-General	11 October 1872 – 1 September 1876
Sir Donald McLean		Minister for Native Affairs	11 October 1872 – 7 December 1876
William Reynolds		Commissioner of Customs	26 October 1872 – 15 February 1876
Edward Richardson		Minister for Public Works	29 October 1872 – 4 January 1877
Wi Katene		Member of Executive Council	4 November 1872 – 15 February 1876
Wiremu Parata		Member of Executive Council	4 December 1872 – 15 February 1876
Harry Atkinson		Secretary for Crown Lands	7 September 1874 – 1 September 1876
Harry Atkinson		Minister for Immigration	10 September 1874 – 1 September 1876
Harry Atkinson		Colonial Treasurer	6 July 1875 – 15 February 1876
Charles Bowen		Minister of Justice	16 December 1874 – 13 October 1877
Charles Bowen		Commissioner of Stamp Duties	16 December 1874 – 13 October 1877

== See also ==
- New Zealand Government
