= Kelston, New Zealand =

Kelston
- Suburb
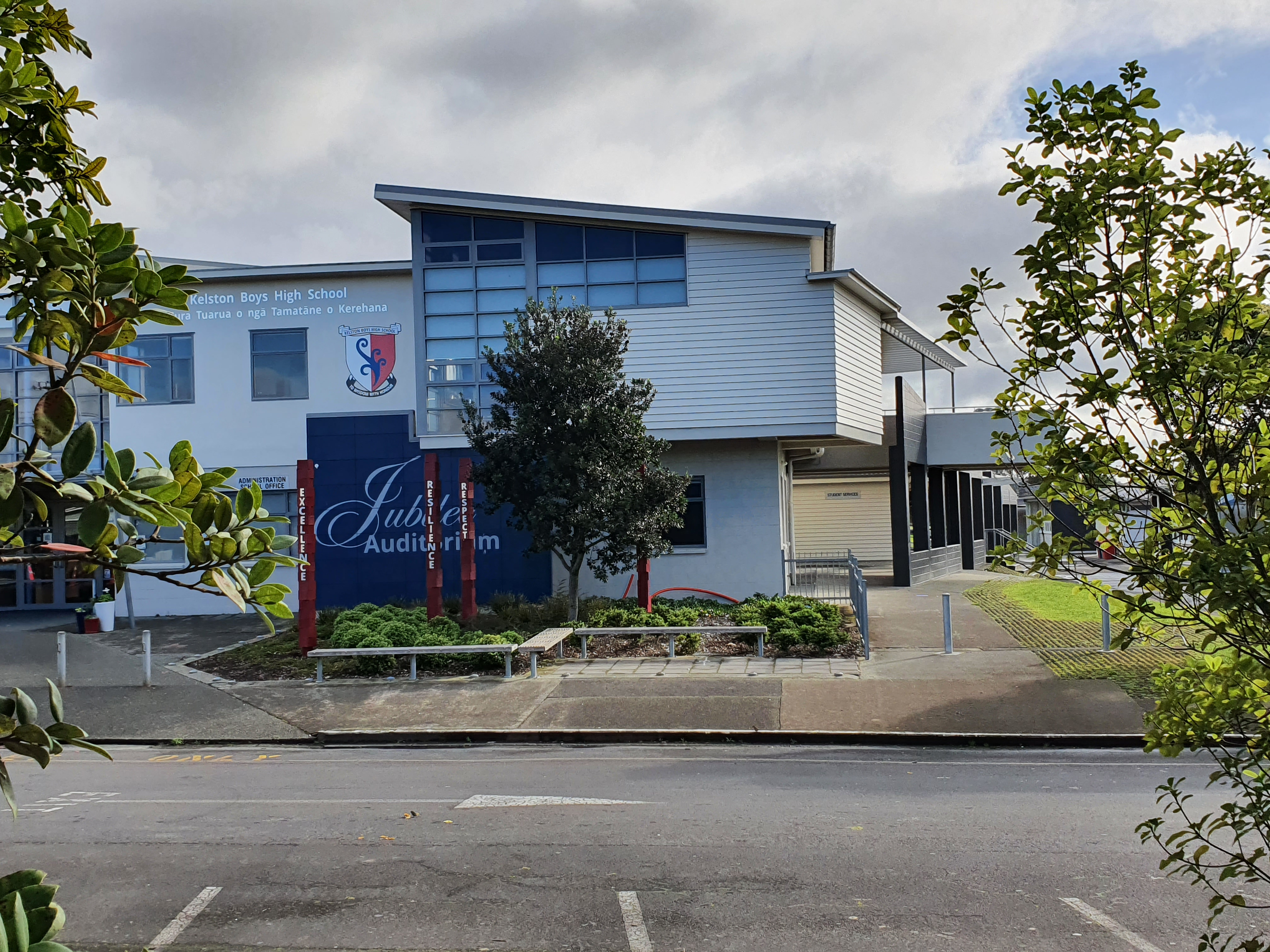
- Kelston is home to several schools, including Kelston Boys'
- Interactive map of Kelston
- Coordinates: 36.901°S 174.666°E
- Country: New Zealand
- City: Auckland
- Local authority: Auckland Council
- Electoral ward: Whau ward
- Local board: Whau Local Board

Area
  - Land: 180 ha (440 acres)

Population (June 2025)
  - Total: 6,380
  - Density: 3,500/km^{2} (9,200/sq mi)

Glendene	(Whau River)	Avondale
Sunnyvale	Kelston	New Lynn
Glen Eden	Glen Eden	New Lynn

Kelston is a residential suburb of West Auckland, New Zealand. Originally a ceramics manufacturing centre, the area is now mostly residential, including a number of schools. Kelston is located in, and its name has been given to, the Kelston parliamentary electorate.

== History ==
The Western shores of the Whau River in Kelston was home to an Archibald Brothers clay and pottery yard in the late 19th century.

== Demographics ==
Kelston covers 1.80 km^{2} (0.69 sq mi) and had an estimated population of 6,380 as of June 2025, with a population density of 3,544 people per km^{2}.

Historical population
Year	Pop.	±% p.a.
2006	4,668	—
2013	4,902	+0.70%
2018	5,355	+1.78%
2023	5,676	+1.17%

Kelston had a population of 5,676 in the 2023 New Zealand census, an increase of 321 people (6.0%) since the 2018 census, and an increase of 774 people (15.8%) since the 2013 census. There were 2,859 males, 2,796 females and 21 people of other genders in 1,617 dwellings. 3.1% of people identified as LGBTIQ+. The median age was 32.8 years (compared with 38.1 years nationally). There were 1,248 people (22.0%) aged under 15 years, 1,293 (22.8%) aged 15 to 29, 2,622 (46.2%) aged 30 to 64, and 510 (9.0%) aged 65 or older.

People could identify as more than one ethnicity. The results were 26.4% European (Pākehā); 16.6% Māori; 35.0% Pasifika; 37.6% Asian; 2.9% Middle Eastern, Latin American and African New Zealanders (MELAA); and 1.3% other, which includes people giving their ethnicity as "New Zealander". English was spoken by 89.4%, Māori language by 4.2%, Samoan by 11.2%, and other languages by 30.4%. No language could be spoken by 3.4% (e.g. too young to talk). New Zealand Sign Language was known by 1.0%. The percentage of people born overseas was 44.3, compared with 28.8% nationally.

Religious affiliations were 40.9% Christian, 10.5% Hindu, 6.1% Islam, 1.7% Māori religious beliefs, 3.1% Buddhist, 0.3% New Age, 0.1% Jewish, and 1.3% other religions. People who answered that they had no religion were 29.3%, and 7.0% of people did not answer the census question.

Of those at least 15 years old, 960 (21.7%) people had a bachelor's or higher degree, 1,944 (43.9%) had a post-high school certificate or diploma, and 1,521 (34.3%) people exclusively held high school qualifications. The median income was $39,100, compared with $41,500 nationally. 270 people (6.1%) earned over $100,000 compared to 12.1% nationally. The employment status of those at least 15 was that 2,373 (53.6%) people were employed full-time, 477 (10.8%) were part-time, and 165 (3.7%) were unemployed.

Individual statistical areas
Name	Area (km^{2})	Population	Density (per km^{2})	Dwellings	Median age	Median income
Kelston North	0.97	2,820	2,907	792	33.7 years	$38,300
Kelston South	0.84	2,853	3,396	822	32.2 years	$39,800
New Zealand					38.1 years	$41,500

== Education ==
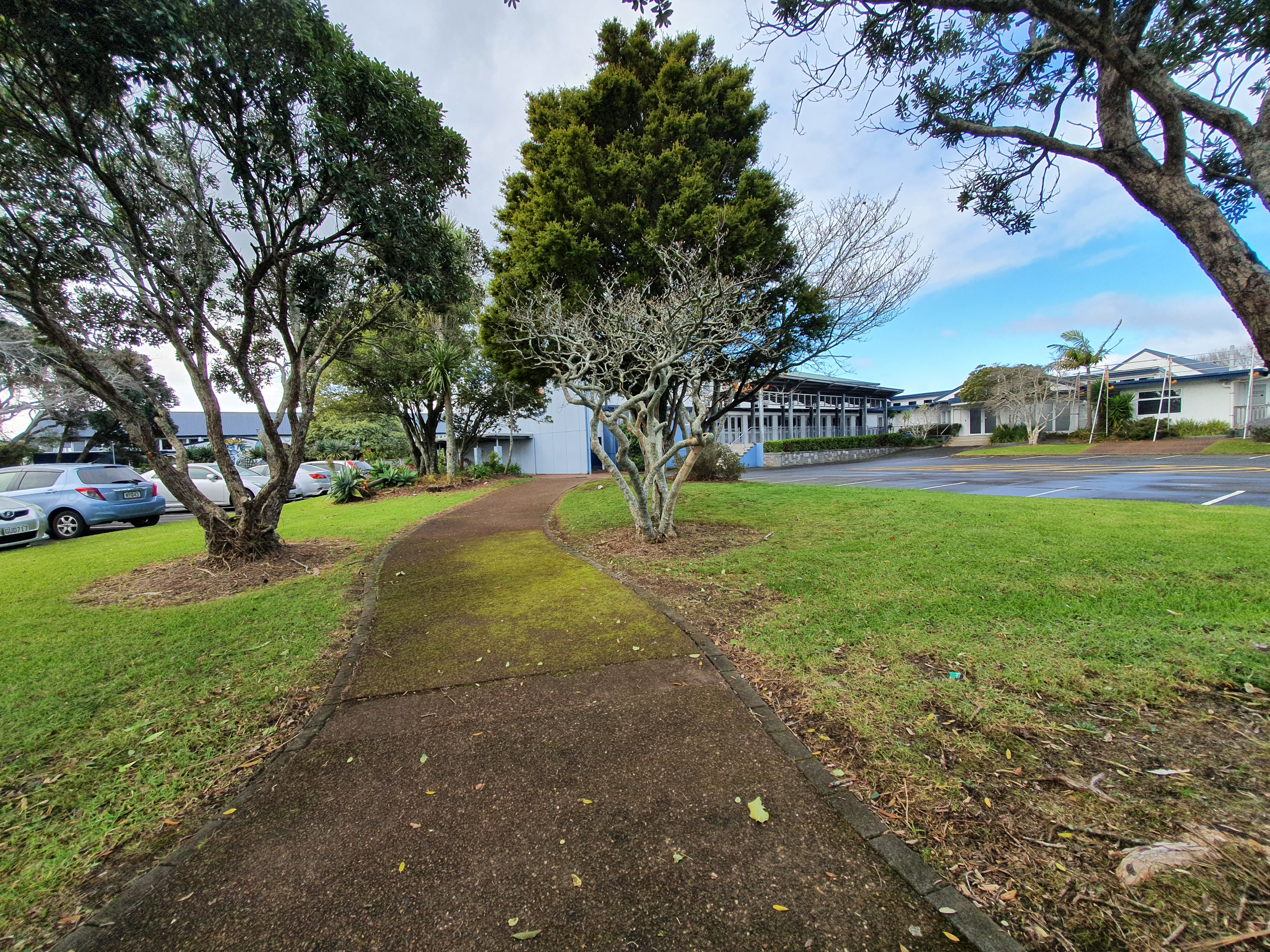
Kelston Girls' College

The first school to open in the area was the New Lynn School, which opened on the modern site of Kelston Girls' College in 1888, moving from the site in 1914. In 1953, Kelston Primary School opened, and in 1954 a coeducational school, Kelston High School, opened at the old site of the New Lynn School, as the third high school to open in West Auckland after Avondale College (1945) and Henderson High School (1953). Kelston High School was separated into two schools in 1963, with Kelston Girls' High School remaining at the site and Kelston Boys' High School moving to a new campus to the north. In 2004, the school was renamed Kelston Girls' College.

Kelston Boys' High School is a single-sex state secondary (years 9–15) school with a roll of 821 students. It is renowned for its rugby union team, the Kelston Boys High 1st XV. The school has produced a number of All Blacks, and regularly wins Auckland, nationwide and even worldwide secondary school rugby championships. Kelston Girls' College is a single-sex state secondary (years 9–15) school with a roll of 594.

In 1958 the Kelston Deaf Education Centre was opened as a centre of learning for hearing-impaired children from the northern half of the North Island, from preschool to year 15. It has boarding facilities. Some senior classes are held in conjunction with Kelston Boys High School. It is currently a campus of Ko Taku Reo: Deaf Education New Zealand, the combined body for deaf education in New Zealand.

Kelston Intermediate is a coeducational state intermediate (years 7–8) school with a roll of 406 students. It opened in 1958. Kelston Primary School and St Leonards Road School are coeducational state contributing primary (years 1-6) schools with rolls of 301 and 436 students, respectively.

Rolls are as of July 2026.
