= Whau River =

River in Auckland, New Zealand

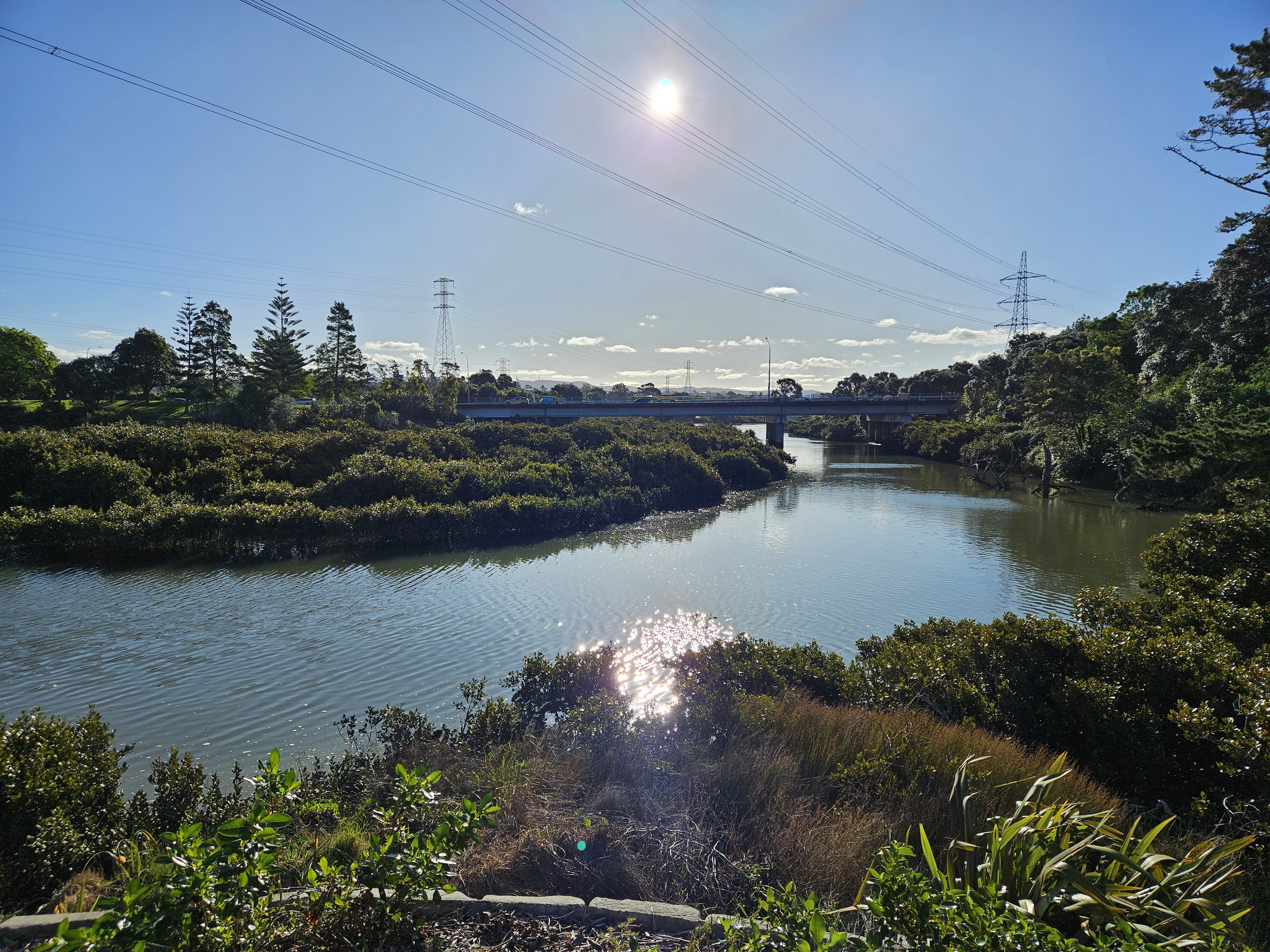
- The Whau River and Rata Street Bridge

- Mouth of the Whau River Whau River (New Zealand)
- Route of the Whau River

Location
- Country: New Zealand
- Region: Auckland Region

Physical characteristics
- Source
  - location: Maungakiekie Golf Club, Mount Roskill
  - coordinates: 36.9225°S 174.72822°E
- Mouth: Waitematā Harbour
  - coordinates: 36.85959°S 174.6582°E

Basin features
- Progression: Whau River → Waitematā Harbour → Hauraki Gulf → Pacific Ocean
- Tributaries
  - left: Avondale Stream, Rewarewa Creek, Taroa Stream, Wairau Creek, Glendene Stream

The Whau River (Māori pronunciation: [ɸau]) is an estuarial arm of the southwestern Waitemata Harbour (rather than a river) within the Auckland metropolitan area in New Zealand. It flows north for 5.7 kilometres (3.5 mi) from its origin at the confluence of the Avondale Stream and Whau Stream to its mouth between the Te Atatū Peninsula and the long, thin Rosebank Peninsula in Avondale. It is 800 metres (2,600 ft) at its widest and 400 metres (1,300 ft) wide at its mouth.

The estuary extends past the suburbs of Glendene and Kelston. It has one small estuarial tributary arm, the Wairau Creek in the southwest. The tide flows up the Wairau Creek as far as Sabulite Road in Kelston, and up the Rewarewa Creek to Clark Street and Wolverton Road in New Lynn. The area at the mouth of the estuary is legally protected as the Motu Manawa (Pollen Island) Marine Reserve.

The Whau River is named after a native tree, the whau (Entelea arborescens).

== Geography ==
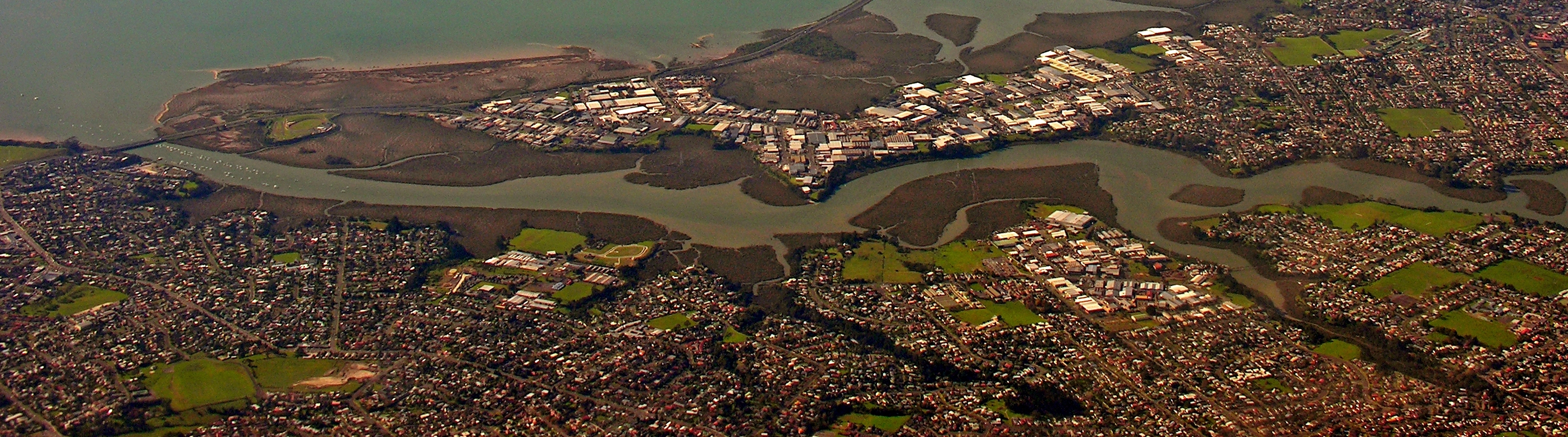
Aerial view of the Whau River mouth

The geology of the area is mainly composed of marine and riverine sediment. The stream's intertidal banks are commonly settled by mangroves and exotic weed species.

The river's catchment covers 29 square kilometres (11 mi^{2}) and includes all or part of Te Atatū South, Glendene, Kelston, Titirangi, Titirangi North, Green Bay, New Lynn, Glen Eden, Avondale, Blockhouse Bay and Mount Albert. Watersheds closely follow Te Atatu Road, Titirangi Road, Hillsborough Road, Richardson Road and Rosebank Road. The catchment consists of clay, sandstone and mud and was formed 20 million years ago when the land was raised from the sea.

== History ==
In earlier times, Māori used Te Tōanga Waka, the Whau River portage, for travel between the Waitemata Harbour (on the Pacific east coast) and the Manukau Harbour (on the Tasman west coast). They paddled canoes up the Whau River and the Avondale Stream and then carried the canoes over a short stretch of land to Green Bay on the Manukau. This is remembered in the name for Portage Road, which runs alongside the Avondale Stream, and it is known that seasonal Māori settlements existed at the mouth of the river. For many years after European settlement, there was talk of making a canal between the Whau and the Manukau. Plans for a 6,900 ft (2.1 km) long canal, with a cutting up to 131 ft (40 m) deep, were made in 1907, but dismissed as too costly in 1921.

From 1841, the banks of the Whau River were logged for Kauri timber. In 1852, the first brickworks in West Auckland were opened on the Rosebank Peninsula by Dr Daniel Pollen on the Whau River. By the late 19th and early 20th centuries, the Whau River became the centre of West Auckland's clayworks; of the 39 brick and clayworks of West Auckland, 23 were located on the Whau River. European settlers used the Whau for marine transport and by 1865 there were five public wharves at New Lynn. Boats carried the products of local industries including brickworks, a leather tannery, a gelatine and glue factory and firewood cutting. The last commercial vessel to use the Whau was a flat-bottomed scow the Rahiri, which carried bricks and manuka firewood from the area until 1948. For nearly a hundred years, factories such as the tannery and an abattoir discharged wastes directly into the Whau.

Friends of the Whau Inc. was formed in 1999 to restore the ecology of the Whau through revegetation and reduction of pollution. The Whau River Catchment Trust was formed in 2012.

The West End Rowing Club has been based in the Whau since 2001.

The Whau River formerly marked the boundary between two territorial authorities in the Auckland region: Waitakere City, centred around West Auckland suburbs, and Auckland City, composed of the central suburbs of the Auckland isthmus. After the amalgamation of the Auckland councils in 2010, the suburbs adjacent to the river were administered by the Whau ward.

In 2015, construction began on the Te Whau Pathway, a walking and cycling path along the western edge of the Whau River from Te Atatū Peninsula to Olympic Park in New Lynn. The path is planned to continue on to Green Bay beach thus connecting the Waitemata Harbour to the Manukau Harbour.
