= Te Atatū South =

- Suburb
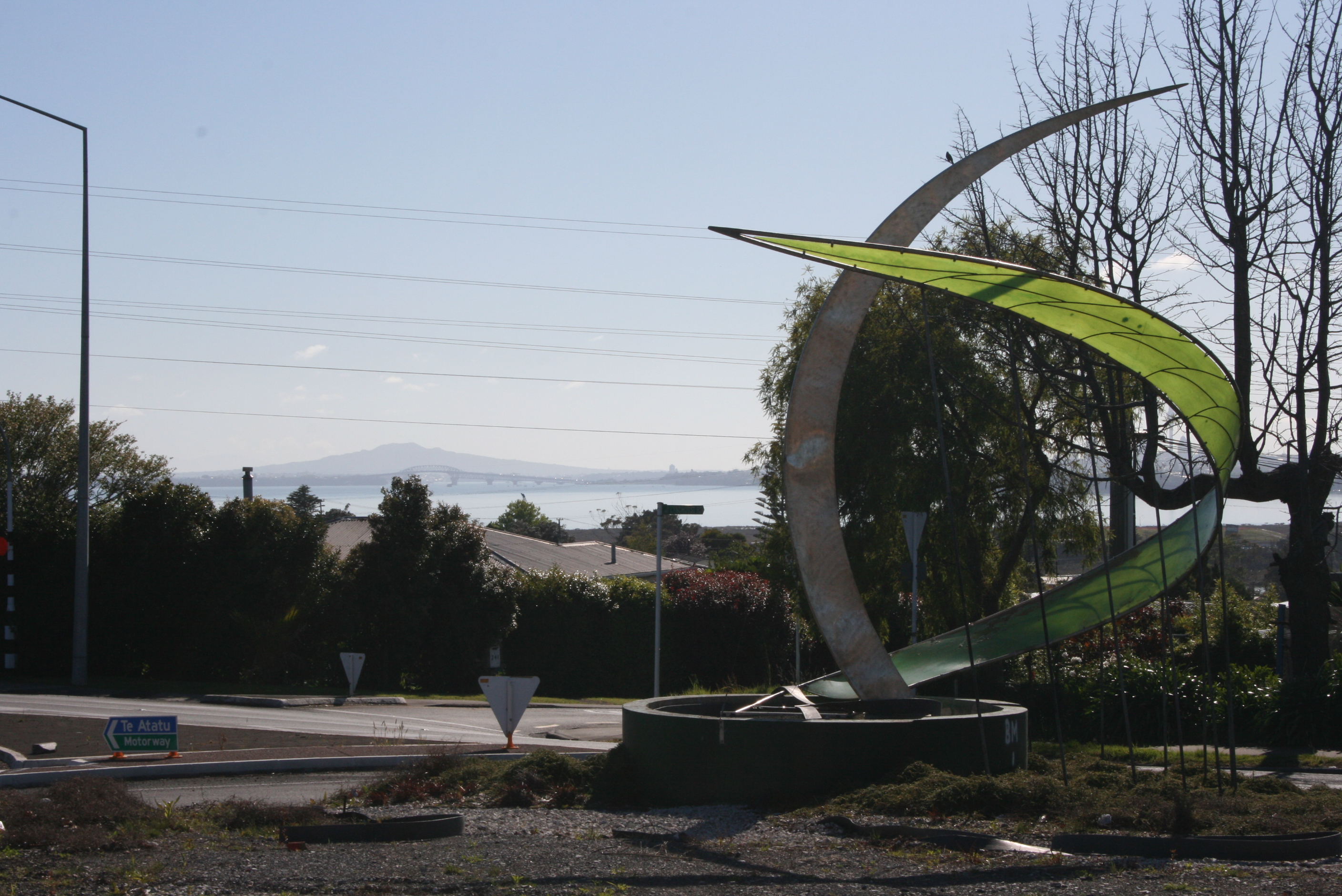
- Wade Cornell Sculpture, Te Atatū South roundabout. This roundabout has since been replaced by traffic lights.
- Interactive map of Te Atatū South
- Coordinates: 36°51′54″S 174°38′49″E
- Country: New Zealand
- City: Auckland
- Local authority: Auckland Council
- Electoral ward: Waitākere ward
- Local board: Henderson-Massey Local Board

Area
  - Land: 455 ha (1,120 acres)

Population (June 2025)
  - Total: 16,910
  - Density: 3,720/km^{2} (9,630/sq mi)

Lincoln	Te Atatū Peninsula	Waitematā Harbour
Henderson	Te Atatū South	(Whau River)
Henderson	Glendene	(Whau River)

Te Atatū South is a residential suburb in West Auckland, New Zealand.

== Geography and geological history ==
Te Atatū South is formed from Waitemata Sandstone, which formed on the ocean floor 20 million years ago, overlaid with alluvial soil from ancient waterways. Te Atatū is bound on the west by the Te Wai-o-Pareira / Henderson Creek and to the east by the Whau River, both of which are drowned valleys. The northern border of the suburb is the Northwestern Motorway, which separates Te Atatū South from the Te Atatū Peninsula (formerly known as Te Atatū North).

Te Atatū South is located in the Tāmaki Ecological District. The majority of the area is a part of the Warm Lowlands Ecosystem, which was originally dominated by a forest of kauri, rimu, rātā, kahikatea and rewarewa trees. The south-east of the suburb around the Whau River has a Harbour Coastline Ecosystem, which was originally a diverse lowland forest, including trees such as pōhutukawa, pūriri, nīkau palms, mamangi and kōwhai.

== History ==
The wider area surrounding the Whau River was known to Māori as Te Whau. Initial European interests in the area were kauri timber milling, followed by brickworks and agriculture and horticulture following the land being cleared of trees, with Crown grants being sold from the 1850s.

The area prior to suburban settlement was used largely for vineyards, poultry farms, fruit trees, apples, lemons orchards and flower farms. Vineyards were located along Te Atatu, McLeod and Edmonton Rd's. There were brickworks under what is now the Whau River bridge and a timber mill at the end of Roberts Rd.

The name "Te Atatu South" was attributed to the area in 1961 when the area of Te Atatū was divided by the Northwestern Motorway (State Highway 16). With the new motorway, the area rapidly changed in 10 years from rural to suburban. While new homes in Te Atatū Peninsula were dominated by one builder, "Neil Homes", Te Atatū South had more diversity in new homes and a large quantity of larger quality family homes. These homes reflected Te Atatū South being one of the more affluent areas in West Auckland during the 1970s and 1980s.

== Demographics ==
Te Atatū South covers 4.55 km^{2} (1.76 sq mi) and had an estimated population of 16,910 as of June 2025, with a population density of 3,716 people per km^{2}.

Historical population
Year	Pop.	±% p.a.
2006	12,459	—
2013	13,797	+1.47%
2018	15,138	+1.87%
2023	15,339	+0.26%

Te Atatū South had a population of 15,339 in the 2023 New Zealand census, an increase of 201 people (1.3%) since the 2018 census, and an increase of 1,542 people (11.2%) since the 2013 census. There were 7,662 males, 7,611 females and 66 people of other genders in 5,022 dwellings. 3.4% of people identified as LGBTIQ+. The median age was 35.2 years (compared with 38.1 years nationally). There were 3,033 people (19.8%) aged under 15 years, 3,063 (20.0%) aged 15 to 29, 7,515 (49.0%) aged 30 to 64, and 1,728 (11.3%) aged 65 or older.

People could identify as more than one ethnicity. The results were 47.0% European (Pākehā); 15.9% Māori; 20.6% Pasifika; 31.8% Asian; 2.9% Middle Eastern, Latin American and African New Zealanders (MELAA); and 2.1% other, which includes people giving their ethnicity as "New Zealander". English was spoken by 91.8%, Māori language by 3.5%, Samoan by 5.6%, and other languages by 29.1%. No language could be spoken by 2.7% (e.g. too young to talk). New Zealand Sign Language was known by 0.6%. The percentage of people born overseas was 40.1, compared with 28.8% nationally.

Religious affiliations were 35.1% Christian, 5.9% Hindu, 3.1% Islam, 0.7% Māori religious beliefs, 2.1% Buddhist, 0.4% New Age, 0.1% Jewish, and 1.2% other religions. People who answered that they had no religion were 45.4%, and 6.1% of people did not answer the census question.

Of those at least 15 years old, 3,246 (26.4%) people had a bachelor's or higher degree, 5,487 (44.6%) had a post-high school certificate or diploma, and 3,567 (29.0%) people exclusively held high school qualifications. The median income was $43,900, compared with $41,500 nationally. 1,392 people (11.3%) earned over $100,000 compared to 12.1% nationally. The employment status of those at least 15 was that 6,777 (55.1%) people were employed full-time, 1,368 (11.1%) were part-time, and 441 (3.6%) were unemployed.

Individual statistical areas
Name	Area (km^{2})	Population	Density (per km^{2})	Dwellings	Median age	Median income
Te Atatū South-North	1.09	3,264	2,994	1,068	35.6 years	$44,800
Te Atatū South-Edmonton	0.92	3,123	3,395	1,059	34.5 years	$43,700
Te Atatū South-Central	0.93	3,309	3,558	1,065	35.8 years	$43,500
Te Atatū South-McLeod North	0.58	2,172	3,745	735	34.5 years	$43,300
Te Atatū South-McLeod South	1.02	3,468	3,400	1,092	35.4 years	$43,900
New Zealand					38.1 years	$41,500

== Schools ==
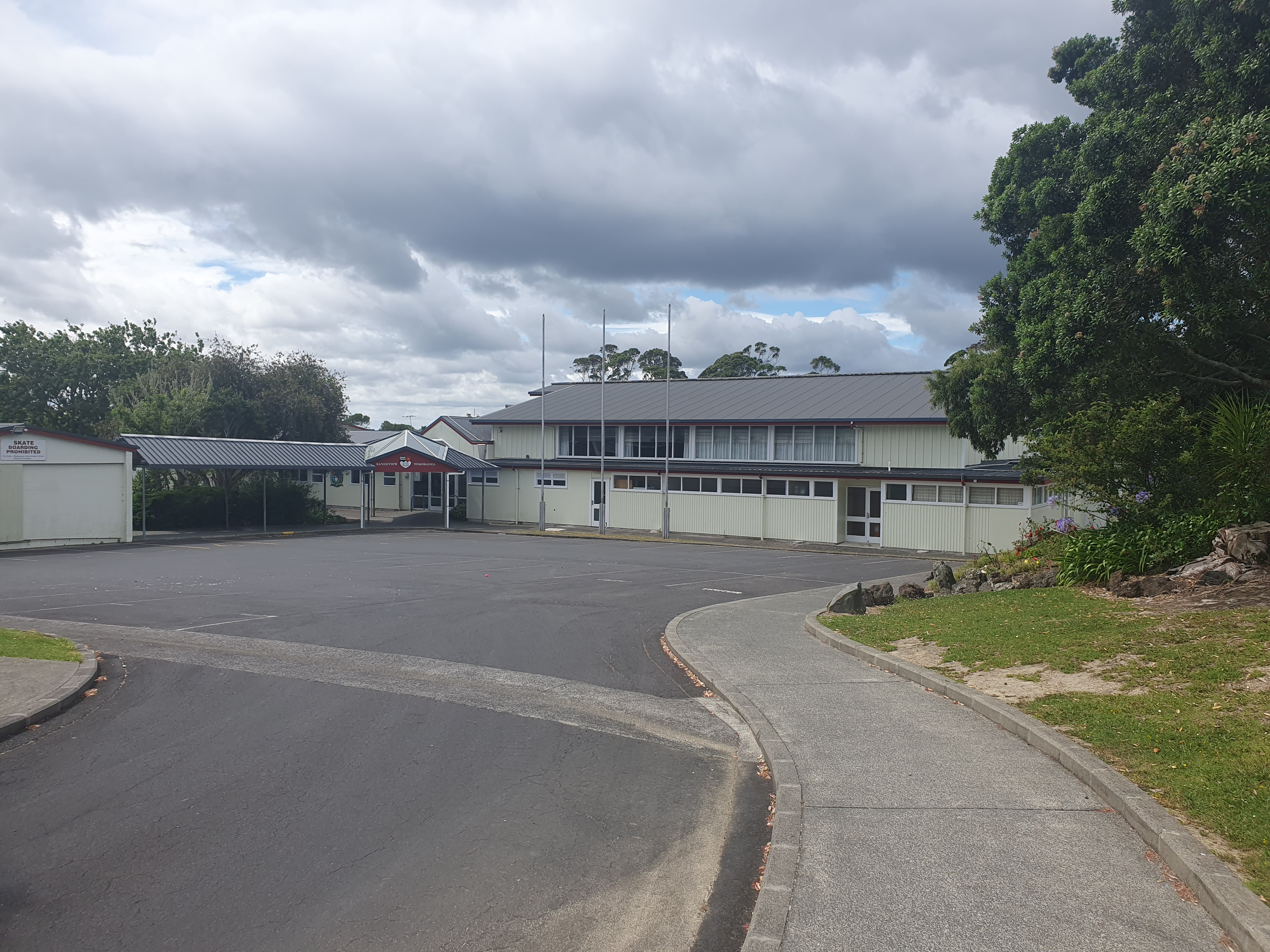
Rangeview Intermediate School

Rangeview Intermediate School is for years 7–8, and has a roll of 457 students. It opened in 1968.

Flanshaw Road School, Tirimoana School, Freyberg Community School and Edmonton Primary School are contributing schools (years 1–6) with rolls of 362, 646, 402 and 207 respectively. Tirimoana School was opened in 1969. Freyberg Community School is named after Bernard Freyberg, a Victoria Cross recipient and Governor-General of New Zealand.

Arohanui School caters for students aged 5 to 21 years with learning disability. It has a roll of 277 students. The school includes students who also attend other local schools.

The local state secondary school that services the area is Rutherford College which is just north of the boundary between the suburb and Te Atatū Peninsula.

All schools are coeducational. Rolls are as of July 2026.

== Parks and Reserves ==
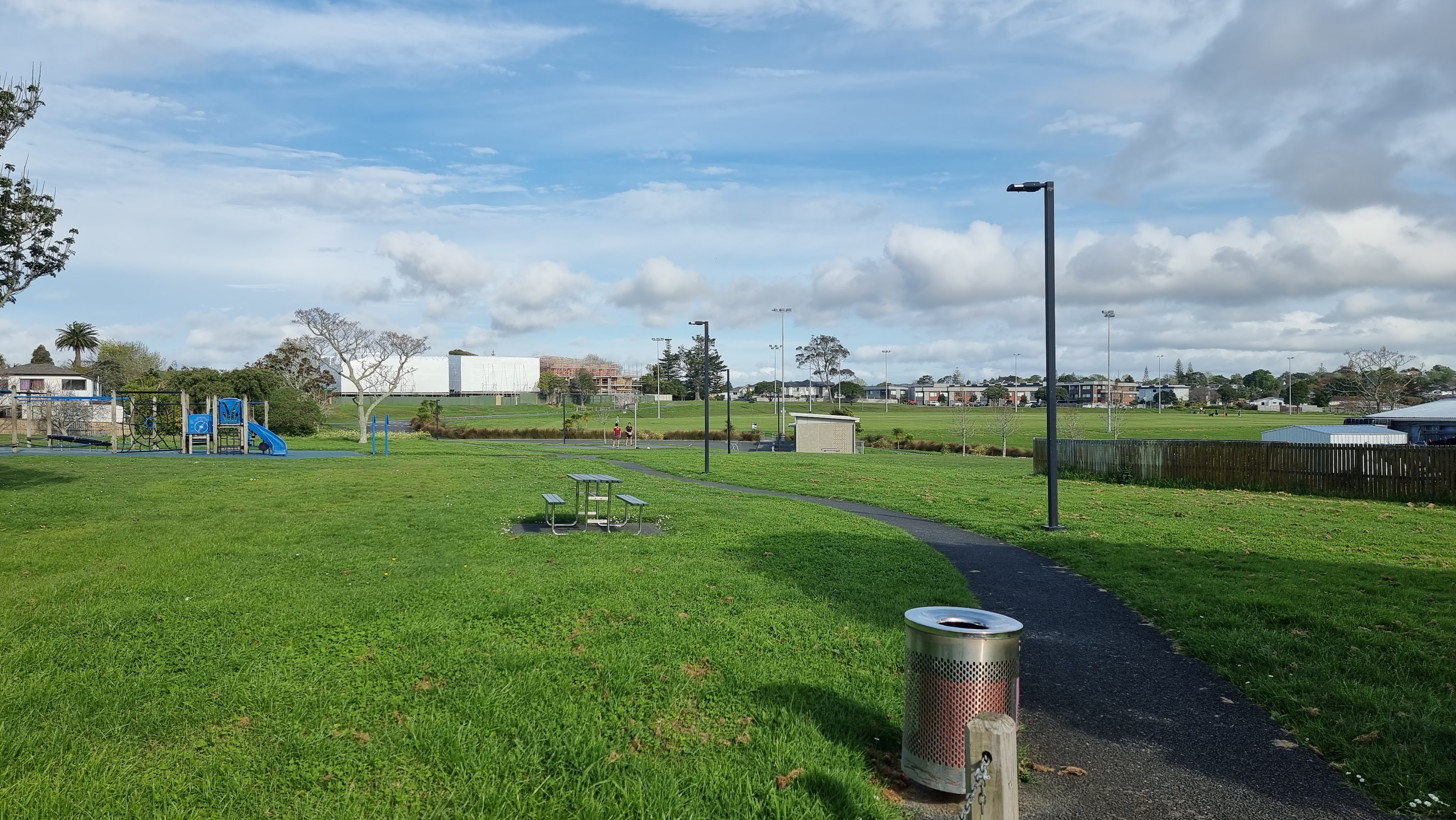
Neville Power Memorial Park

Te Atatū South has numerous walkways, parks, reserves, esplanades, and sporting facilities. Both coasts have walking paths, including the Twin Streams Pathway on the western side and the Te Whau Pathway on the eastern side. Notable parks in the area include Te Atatū South Park, which has sports fields, a walking track, fitness equipment, and a playground. McLeod Park also has sports fields, a playground, and a walking track. Nearby is Tui Glen Reserve, known for its treetop playground and picnic facilities.The Trusts Arena is also nearby, offering a running track, gym, and sports facilities. The Te Atatū Boat Club provides boat and kayak launching facilities.

== Sport ==
Te Atatū South is home to Waitemata AFC, West City Baseball Club (NZ's longest running baseball club) and fields for Waitakere Rugby club. The Te Atatu Boating Club was founded in 1959.

== Main centres ==
Its main centre is the Te Atatū Town Centre where Edmonton Road and Te Atatu Road intersect. The Te Atatū South Community Centre is located here.

A small light industrial area is located on McLeod Road.

== Transport ==
Te Atatu Road: the main road that runs through the whole suburb. Bus services run along here and Edmonton Road.

Edmonton Road: links to Henderson with close proximity to the Henderson Railway Station.

McLeod Road: a main road linking the southern part of the suburb to Henderson.

State Highway 16 (SH 16) / Northwestern Cycleway: the northern tip of the suburb links to the city and to the north. The Te Atatū State Highway interchange will be one of the stations on the proposed Western Route of the Light rail in Auckland network.

Twin Stream Walkway/Cycleway: on the western side of the suburb and running along Te Wai-o-Pareira / Henderson Creek from the NorthWestern cycleway to Henderson's Twin streams and on to Oratia or Henderson Valley.

Te Whau Pathway (in progress): a walkway/cycleway on the eastern side of the suburb running along the historic Whau River. When completed it will link Te Atatū to Green Bay creating a pathway between the Manukau and Waitemata Harbour's.

Ferry Service (proposed). A ferry service has been proposed to link the suburb to the centre city.

== Notable buildings and landmarks ==
36 Te Atatu Rd – Two Storey 520 square metres (5,600 sq ft) home built in the 1930s for the wealthy Ryan family. It has been home to the Henderson Tennis Club and in 1955 it was bought by the Auckland Hospital Board and became a maternity hospital. It has been used recently for other commercial purposes.

Coop's Store - 104 McLeod Road. Built in the 1920s this store was the only store that serviced the area at the time and since then has continuously been operating a retail function in the suburb. It is situated on the corner of McLeod Road and Te Atatu Road. It has been a number of uses and currently is a café and food establishment.

111 McLeod Rd (Women's Centre). Built in 1924. Was the residence of aviator Bob Johnson. The front door is adorned with a stained glass plane. He is responsible for a number of photographs of the area in the 1930s.

Ayr House - 17 Ayrton Street. Two storey home built out of kauri by the Roberts Family in the 1910s. The surrounding area was where the family had a timber factory and planted a lemon tree farm.

Swan Arch - Swan Arch Reserve, Central Park Drive. On the border of Te Atatū South and Henderson. Built by Henry Swan between 1901 and 1931. Henry Swan's story has been romanticised over the years. The Devonport solicitor told friends he was going to sail around the world in his yacht, Awatea but ended up living the life of a recluse on this part of the Henderson Creek for the next 30 years. In his time there he built the brick arch and kept an orchard.

Te Atatū South Community Centre – 247 Edmonton Road. The original centre opened in 1968.

== Notable past and present residents ==
- Brooke Family - Rugby family including All Black's Zinzan Brooke and Robin Brooke
- Sir Graeme Douglas - Founder of Douglas Pharmaceuticals
- Marina Erakovic – Tennis player
- Shayne Elliott - ANZ Group Chief Executive
- Michael Erceg - Founder of Independent Liquor
- Jan Hellriegel - Singer/songwriter
- Sir Michael Jones - All Black
- Kees Meeuws - All Black
- Paula Morris - Writer
- John Rowles – OBE. Singer
- Pio Terei - Actor, singer, comedian and TV presenter
- Paul Urlovic – Ex All White
- Ivan Vicelich – Most capped All White
