= Motumānawa / Pollen Island =

Island in New Zealand

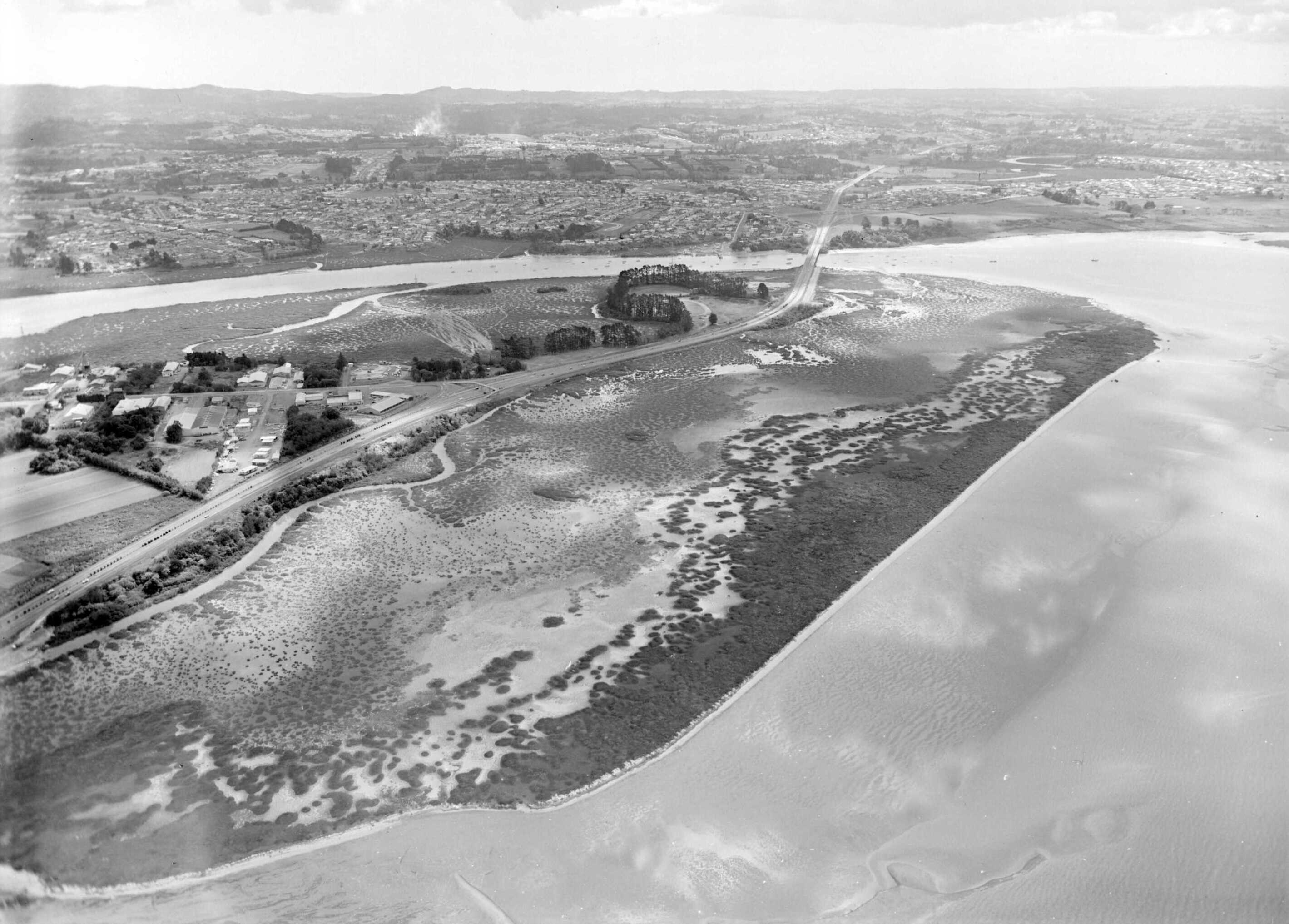
- Motumānawa / Pollen Island in 1969, adjacent to the Northwestern Motorway
- Interactive map of Motumānawa / Pollen Island

Geography
- Location: Auckland
- Coordinates: 36°51′45″S 174°40′10″E
- Adjacent to: Waitematā Harbour

Administration
- New Zealand

Motumānawa / Pollen Island is an island in the Waitematā Harbour, very near the northern end of Rosebank Peninsula, in Auckland, New Zealand. The official name of the island was changed from Pollen Island and gazetted as Motumānawa / Pollen Island on 12 November 2015.

== History ==
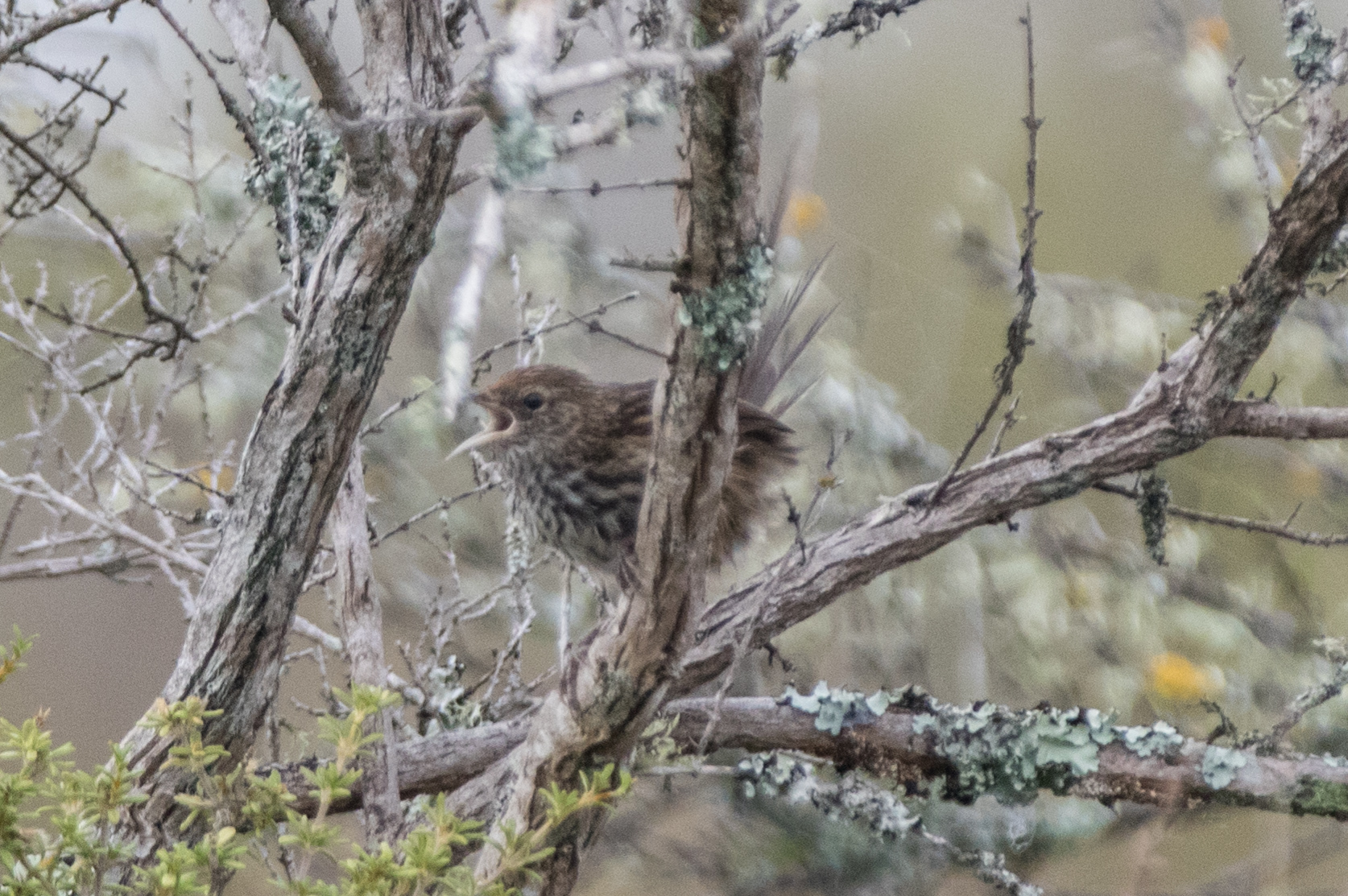
A New Zealand fernbird seen on Motumānawa / Pollen Island

The island was given its English name from Daniel Pollen, who bought it in 1855. He later became Premier of New Zealand. Pollen used the shellbanks of the island to produce lime for the brick and concrete industries. In 1918, the Avondale Road Board purchased the island, in order to harvest the shells to be used for construction projects, such as layering on footpaths.

The island has been owned and managed by the Department of Conservation (DOC) since late 2005, when it was acquired from Ports of Auckland. It was gazetted as an open scientific reserve in 2006. It had been leased by Forest and Bird from Ports of Auckland between June 1995 to June 2005. During the lease Forest and Bird identified the native plants and animals living there and prepared a management plan.

== Biodiversity ==
The island is a part of the wider intertidal ecosystem of the Motu Manawa (Pollen Island) Marine Reserve. Motumānawa / Pollen Island is a breeding spot for New Zealand dotterels, New Zealand fernbirds, the banded rail and the black-backed gull. The main vegetation on the island is Juncus kraussii, Apodasmia similis and Plagianthus divaricatus, with smaller patches of New Zealand flax and Olearia solandri.

== Marine reserve ==
The Motu Manawa-Pollen Island Marine Reserve was established in 1996.
