= Māori protest movement =

Indigenous rights movement in New Zealand

The Māori protest movement is a broad indigenous rights movement in New Zealand (Aotearoa). While there was a range of conflicts between Māori and European immigrants prior to the signing of the Treaty of Waitangi in 1840, the signing provided one reason for protesting. Disagreements in the decades following the signing sometimes included war.

In its modern form, the Māori protest movement emerged in the early 1970s as part of a broader Māori renaissance and has focused on issues such as the redressing Treaty of Waitangi grievances, Māori land-rights, the Māori language, culture, and racism in New Zealand. It has generally allied with the left-wing, although it differs from the mainstream left in a number of ways. Most members of the movement have been Māori but it has attracted some support from non-Māori New Zealanders and from other indigenous peoples around the world. Notable successes of the movement include establishment of the Waitangi Tribunal in 1975, the return of some Māori land, and the Māori language becoming an official language in New Zealand in 1987.

== Background ==
Although a large proportion of chiefs had signed the Treaty of Waitangi in 1840, there were almost immediately disagreement over British sovereignty of the country, which led to several armed conflicts and disputes beginning in the 1840s, including the Flagstaff War, a dispute over the flying of the British Union Flag at the then colonial capital, Kororāreka in the Bay of Islands.

The Māori King Movement (Kīngitanga) began in the 1850s partly as a means of focusing Māori power in a manner which would allow them to negotiate with the Governor and Queen on equal footing. The chiefs justified this by the treaty's guarantee of rangatiratanga (chieftainship), but in the early 1860s the government used the Māori King Movement as an excuse to invade lands in the eastern parts of the North Island, culminating in the Crown's confiscation of large parts of the Waikato and Taranaki from Māori – the government arguing that the chiefs of Waikato and Taranaki were rebels against the Crown.

Since then, Māori have used petitions, court cases, deputations to the British monarch and to the New Zealand and British governments, passive resistance and boycotts to try to achieve their goals. Some of this resistance came from religious groups such as Pai Mārire (from the 1860s) and Ringatū (founded in 1868). Prophets such as Te Kooti (c. 1832–1893), Rua Kenana (1869–1937) and Te Whiti (c. 1830–1907) are early Māori activists who made a stand and brought followers to action against injustice. There were protests about the Maori Land Boards in 1905 and earlier too before the Maori Lands Administration Act of 1900.

Tahupōtiki Wiremu Rātana (1873–1939) founded a church and then joined parliament. The New Zealand Government history website says, "Rātana believed that for Māori to progress the Crown needed to honour the Treaty of Waitangi." Some Māori also worked within pākehā systems such as the New Zealand Parliament in order to resist land loss and cultural imperialism – in particular Ngata, one of the most important and influential Māori MP's (Member for Eastern Maori, 1905–1943), who tried to combine the benefits of both cultures for Māori.

From World War II (1939–1945), but especially from the 1950s, Māori moved from rural to urban areas in large numbers, this affected race relations, as previously there was less contact between Māori and pākehā. Māori urbanisation brought the differences between the cultures and the economic gaps between Māori and pākehā into the open. Urban Māori tended to be young as the elders stayed in the rural areas and so did not have the support or influence of their whānau and hapū. They also encountered barriers in housing, income options, and general bigotry.

Several new groups, most prominently the Māori Women's Welfare League (founded in 1951) and the New Zealand Māori Council (formed in 1962) emerged to help urban Māori and to provide a unified voice for Māori. The first president of the Māori Women's Welfare League was Whina Cooper. These groups were conservative by later standards but did criticise the government on numerous occasions.

The first significant Māori connection with pākehā activists came during controversy over the exclusion of Māori players from the 1960 All Blacks rugby tour of South Africa. Author Rawiri Taonui says: "Pākehā marched against racism in South Africa; Māori marched against racism in South Africa and Aotearoa."

== The Māori Affairs Amendment Act ==
In the mid-1960s the National government proposed to make Māori land more 'economic' by encouraging its transfer to a pākehā system of land ownership. The Māori Affairs Amendment Act 1967, as it became, generally allowed greater interference in Māori landholding, and was widely seen amongst Māori as a pākehā "land grab". Under the Māori Affairs Act of 1957, land owners who had shares less than $50 were forced to sell their shares which became a problematic type of land alienation. This was intensified under the 1967 Act. The plans were strongly opposed by virtually every Māori group and organisation as the Act blatantly ignored the importance of Māori land being tūrangawaewae. Despite this, the Act was passed with only minor modifications.

The Act is generally seen as the catalyst for the Māori protest movement, and the evidence certainly points to this. However the movement can also be seen as part of a wider civil rights movement which emerged across the world in the 1960s. The Act was abolished under the Māori Affairs Amendment Act of 1974, led by minister of Māori Affairs, Matiu Rata

In November 2024, Tens of thousands of people gathered at New Zealand's parliament in Wellington, following a nine-day hīkoi, to protest the Treaty Principles Bill. Opponents of the bill argue it undermines Māori rights and the long-standing principles of the Treaty of Waitangi. The large-scale demonstration highlighted strong solidarity among Māori communities and their allies.

== Sporting contact with South Africa ==
Early activism over the issue of sporting contacts with apartheid South Africa

New Zealand has a long history of sporting contact with South Africa, especially through rugby union. Until the 1970s this resulted in discrimination against Māori players, since the apartheid political system in South Africa for most of the twentieth century did not allow people of different races to play sport together, and therefore South African officials requested that Māori players not be included in sides which toured their country. Despite some of New Zealand's best players being Māori, this was agreed to, and Māori were excluded from tours of South Africa. Some Māori always objected to this, but it did not become a major issue until 1960, when there were several public protests at Māori exclusion from that year's tour. The protest group Halt All Racist Tours was formed in 1969. Although this was an issue in which Māori were central, and Māori were involved in the protests, the anti-tour movement was dominated by pākehā.

In 1973, a proposed tour of New Zealand by the Springboks (the South African rugby team) was cancelled. In 1976 the South African government relented and allowed a mixed-race All Black team to tour South Africa. However, by this time international opinion had turned against any sporting contact with South Africa, and New Zealand faced significant international pressure to cut ties. Despite this, in 1981 the Springboks toured New Zealand, sparking mass protests and civil disobedience. Although pākehā continued to dominate the movement, Māori were prominent within it, and in Auckland formed the patu squad in order to remain autonomous within the wider movement.

During and after the Tour, many Māori protesters questioned pākehā protesters' commitment to racial equality, accusing them of focussing on racism in other countries while ignoring it within New Zealand. The majority of pākehā protesters were not heavily involved in protest after the Tour ended, but a significant minority, including several anti-Tour groups, turned their attention to New Zealand race issues, particularly pākehā prejudice and the Treaty of Waitangi.

== Waitangi Day protests ==
The first act of the Māori protest movement was arguably the boycott of Waitangi Day by a handful of Māori elders in 1968 in protest over the Māori Affairs Amendment Act. A small protest was also held at parliament, and was received by Labour MP Whetu Tirikatene-Sullivan. Although both were reported in the newspapers they made little impact. In 1971 the ceremonies were disrupted by the protest group Ngā Tamatoa (The Young Warriors) who chanted and performed haka during speeches, and attempted to destroy the flag. There have been other protests on Waitangi Day also.

== Māori language and culture activism ==
One of the early goals of the Māori protest movement was the promotion of Māori language (te reo Māori) and culture. Both of these had been generally ignored by the education system and New Zealand society in general, and schoolchildren were actively discouraged from speaking Māori in school. The 1867 Native Schools Act decreed that English should be the only language used in the education of Māori children- this policy was later rigorously enforced. This movement was led by Māori MPs who saw the advantages of Māori becoming fluent in a dominant world language. Until Māori became largely urbanised after World War II, this did not seriously damage the language since most Māori spoke it in their rural communities. Urbanisation produced a generation of Māori who mostly grew up in non-Māori environments and were therefore less exposed to the language. In addition, many parents felt that it was much more important for their children to be fluent in English and made no attempts to pass on the language.

As a result, many leaders of Māori protest were not fluent in Māori and felt that this was a major cultural loss. In the face of official indifference and sometimes hostility, Ngā Tamatoa and other groups initiated a number of schemes for the promotion of the language. These included Māori Language Day, which later became te Wiki o te Reo Māori (Māori Language Week); a programme which trained fluent speakers as teachers; and kōhanga reo: Māori language pre-schools and later Māori kura or separate immersion schools at primary and secondary level. Later there were campaigns for a Māori share of the airwaves. These eventually resulted in the iwi radio stations and a Māori Television channel, all of which actively promote the language.

In 1987 Te Reo was made an official language of New Zealand, with the passing of the Māori Language Act. Activists also campaigned to change the names of landmarks such as mountains back to their original Māori names, and to end the mispronunciation of Māori words, especially by newsreaders and other broadcasters. Many Māori cultural forms, such as carving, weaving and performing arts such as haka had gone into decline in the nineteenth century. From the early twentieth century Āpirana Ngata and others made efforts to revive them, for example setting up intertribal kapa haka competitions and getting state funding for meeting houses. Māori activists continued this tradition, but their primary focus was on stopping the abuse of Māori cultural forms.

The best known example of this was the 'haka party' incident. A group of University of Auckland engineering students had for many years performed a parody haka and paddled an imaginary waka around central Auckland as a capping stunt. Repeated requests to end the performance were ignored and eventually a group of Māori assaulted the students. Although the activists' actions were widely condemned by pākehā, they were defended in court by Māori elders and were convicted but the students' stunt was not performed again. A theatre play on this topic called The Haka Party Incident presented by the Auckland Festival in 2021 directed and written by Katie Wolfe. Most recent Māori protest in this sphere has been directed against non-New Zealand groups and businesses who use the Māori language and cultural forms—sometimes copyrighting them—without permission or understanding. Since it is internationally known, the haka of the All Blacks is particularly vulnerable to this treatment.

In December 2022, Mayor of Kaipara Craig Jepson's ban on karakia (Māori prayers) from Kaipara District Council proceedings provoked a hīkoi (protest march) in Dargaville. The hīkoi was organised by Paturiri Toautu, who stood as a candidate for the Kaipara council's new Te Moananui o Kaipara Māori ward during the 2022 New Zealand local elections.

== The Treaty of Waitangi ==
The Treaty of Waitangi has always been a major focus of Māori protest. It is often used to argue for particular aims, such as return of unjustly taken land, and the promotion of the Māori language.

=== The Treaty to the mid 20th century ===
The Treaty of Waitangi was an agreement, made in 1840, between the British Crown and various Māori chiefs. There were differences between the Māori and English language versions of the Treaty.

=== Campaign for ratification ===
From about the mid nineteenth century, Māori campaigned for proper recognition of the Treaty, generally asking that it be ratified or otherwise made a part of New Zealand law. In the 1960s and the 1970s, Māori activists continued this campaign, sometimes making it a focus of their Waitangi Day protests. In 1975 the Treaty was given some recognition with the Treaty of Waitangi Act. This established the Waitangi Tribunal, which was given the task to investigating contemporary breaches of the Treaty. However, since it was not able to investigate historical breaches, was underfunded, and generally unsympathetic to claimants, most Māori were disappointed by the Tribunal.

=== "The Treaty is a Fraud" ===
Some Māori activists in the early 1980s stopped asking for the Treaty to be honoured and instead argued that it was a fraudulent document. They argued that Māori had been tricked in 1840, that either they had never agreed to sign away their sovereignty or that pākehā breaches of the Treaty had rendered it invalid. Since the Treaty was invalid, it was argued, the New Zealand government had no right to sovereignty over the country. This argument was broadly expressed in Donna Awatere's book Māori Sovereignty.

=== Activism and the Tribunal ===
In 1985 the Treaty of Waitangi Act was amended to allow the Tribunal to investigate historic breaches of the Treaty. It was also given more funding and its membership increased. In addition, the Treaty was mentioned in several pieces of legislation, and a number of court cases increased its importance. As a result, most Māori activists began to call once again for the Treaty to be honoured. Many protesters put their energies into Treaty claims and the management of settlements, but many also argued that the Tribunal was too underfunded and slow, and pointed out that because its recommendations were not binding the government could (and did) ignore it when it suited them. Some protesters continued to argue for Māori sovereignty, arguing that by negotiating with the Tribunal Māori were only perpetuating the illegal occupying government.

In December 2023, activist group Te Waka Hourua defaced the English version of the Treaty of Waitangi at the "Signs of a Nation" exhibition at Te Papa Museum in Wellington. The group accused the Museum of "perpetuating a lie long used by the government to trample Māori rights and enforce colonial rule on the land and its people." Police arrested 12 people on charges of intentional damage and breaching bail while eight were arrested for trespassing. In response to the protest action, Te Papa chief executive Courtney Johnston and Māori co-leader Dr Arapata Hakiwai said that they had heard the protesters' message and would "renew" the "Signs of a Nation" exhibition to reflect a range of perspectives. Stuff also reported that Te Papa had promised to replace the "Signs of a Nation" exhibit two years previously.

=== Response to the Treaty Principles Bill ===
The Treaty Principles Bill was proposed in 2024 with the goal of reinterpreting the Treaty of Waitangi and reducing Maori authority and representation in the government. Proponents argue that established interpretation of the Treaty gave disproportionate power and representation to Maori people over other demographic groups. Opponents of the bill argue that the Bill was an attempt by the conservative party to continue limiting Maori rights and diminishing their autonomy. During the first reading of the Treaty Principles Bill, Maori politicians and activists participated in a haka led by Hana-Rawhiti Maipi-Clarke to disrupt the reading and initial vote. Over the course of nine days after the haka protest, activists and opponents against the bill participated in a hīkoi, a peaceful protest march. The bill was ultimately defeated in 112-11 vote on April 10, 2025.

== Land ==
The longest-standing Māori grievances generally involve land and the economic disadvantage losing land created. In the century after 1840 Māori lost possession of most of their land, although the amount lost varied significantly between iwi. In some cases the land was purchased legitimately from willing Māori sellers, but in many cases the transfer was illegal and morally dubious. The best known cause of Māori land loss is the confiscation in the Waikato and Taranaki regions following the New Zealand Wars. Other causes included owners selling land without fully understanding the implications of the sale (especially in the early years of colonisation); groups selling land which did not belong to them; pākehā traders enticing land owners into debt and then claiming the land as payment; the conducting of unrequested surveys which were then charged to the owners, and the unpaid bills from this used to justify taking the land; levying of unreasonable rates and confiscation following non-payment; the taking of land for public works; and simple fraud. Upon losing land, most iwi quickly embarked on campaigns to regain it but these were largely unsuccessful. Some iwi received token payments from the government but continued to agitate for the return of the land or, failing that, adequate compensation.

The return of lost land was a major focus of Māori activists, and generally united the older, more conservative generation with the younger 'protest' generation. Some of the best-known episodes of Māori protest centred on land, including:

=== Bastion Point ===
Bastion Point in Auckland was originally part of a large area of land owned by Ngāti Whātua. Between 1840 and 1960 nearly all of this was lost, leaving Ngāti Whātua with only the Point. In the 1970s the third National government proposed taking the land and developing it. Bastion Point was subsequently occupied in a protest led by Joe Hawke which lasted from January 1977 to May 1978. The protesters were removed by the army and police, but there continued to be conflict over the land. When the Waitangi Tribunal was given the power to investigate historical grievances, this the Ōrākei claim covering the Bastion Point area was one of the first cases for investigation. The Tribunal found that Ngāti Whātua had been unjustly deprived of their ancestral land hence Bastion Point was returned to their ownership with compensation paid to the tribe by the Crown.

=== Raglan Golf Course ===
During the Second World War, land in the Raglan area was taken from its Māori owners for use as an airstrip. Following the end of the war, the land was not returned but instead leased to the Raglan Golf Club, who turned it into a golf course. This was particularly painful for the original owners as it contained burial grounds, one of which was turned into a bunker. A group of protesters led by Eva Rickard and assisted by Angeline Greensill occupied the land and also used legal means to have the land returned, a goal which was eventually achieved.

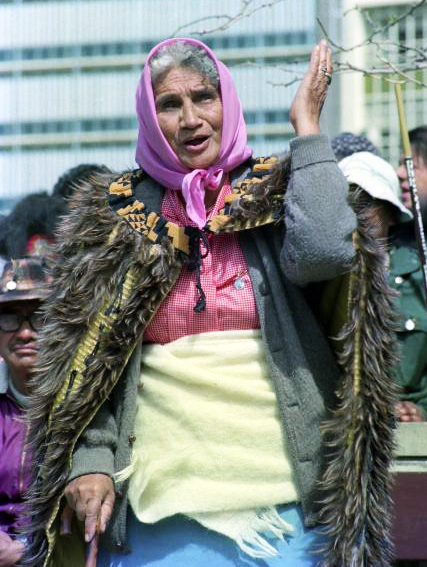
Whina Cooper leads the Māori Land March through Hamilton in 1975

=== 1975 Land March ===
In 1975 a large group (around 5000) of Māori and other New Zealanders, led by then 79-year-old Whina Cooper, walked the length of the North Island to Wellington to protest against Māori land loss. Although the government at the time, the third Labour government, had done more to address Māori grievances than nearly any prior government, protesters felt that much more needed to be done. Following the march, the protesters were divided over what to do next. Some, including Tāme Iti, remained in Wellington to occupy parliament grounds. A 1975 documentary from director Geoff Steven includes interviews with many of those on the march: Eva Rickard, Tama Poata and Whina Cooper. Footage of the television coverage of the march was included in the 1978 television adaptation of Death of the Land by Māori playwright Rowley Habib.

== Resurgence of protest on land and Treaty issues from the 1990s ==
A series of protests in the mid-1990s marked a new phase of activism on land and Treaty issues, with action focused not only on the Government but also Māori conservatives who were seen by the protesters as complicit with the Government agenda. Symbolic acts have included attacking Victorian statuary, the America's Cup (1996) and the lone pine on One Tree Hill (Auckland) and removing (1997)a Colin McCahon painting (subsequently returned) from the Lake Waikaremoana Visitor Centre. Rising protests at Waitangi Day celebrations led the government to move some official observances to Government House in Wellington. Many protests were generated in response to the government's proposal to limit the monetary value of Treaty settlements to one billion dollars over 10 years, the so-called "fiscal envelope". A series of hui (meetings) graphically illustrated the breadth and depth of Māori rejection of such a limitation in advance of the extent of claims being fully known. As a result, much of the policy package, especially the fiscal cap, was dropped. These protests included occupations of Whanganui's Moutoa Gardens and the Takahue school in Northland (leading to its destruction by fire).

=== Fiscal envelope ===
The government unveiled the fiscal envelope – its answer to settling Treaty of Waitangi grievances limiting the total amount that will be spent to one billion dollars. While early Tribunal recommendations mainly concerned a contemporary issue that could be revised or rectified by the government at the time, historical settlements raised more complex issues. The Office of Treaty Settlements was established in the Ministry of Justice to develop government policy on historical claims. In 1995, the government developed the "Crown Proposals for the Settlement of Treaty of Waitangi Claims" to attempt to address the issues. A key element of the proposals was the creation of a "fiscal envelope" of $1 billion for the settlement of all historical claims, an effective limit on what the Crown would pay out in settlements. The Crown held a series of consultation hui around the country, at which Māori vehemently rejected such a limitation in advance of the extent of claims being fully known. The concept of the fiscal envelope was subsequently dropped after the 1996 general election. Opposition to the policy was coordinated by Te Kawau Maro an Auckland group who organised protests at the Government consultation Hui. Rising protests to the Fiscal Envelope at the Waitangi Day celebrations led the government to move the official observance to Government House in Wellington. Despite universal rejection of the 'Fiscal Envelope', Waikato-Tainui negotiators, accepted the Government Deal which became known as the Waikato Tainui Raupatu Settlement. Notable opposition to this deal was led by Māori leader Eva Rickard.

=== Pākaitore ===
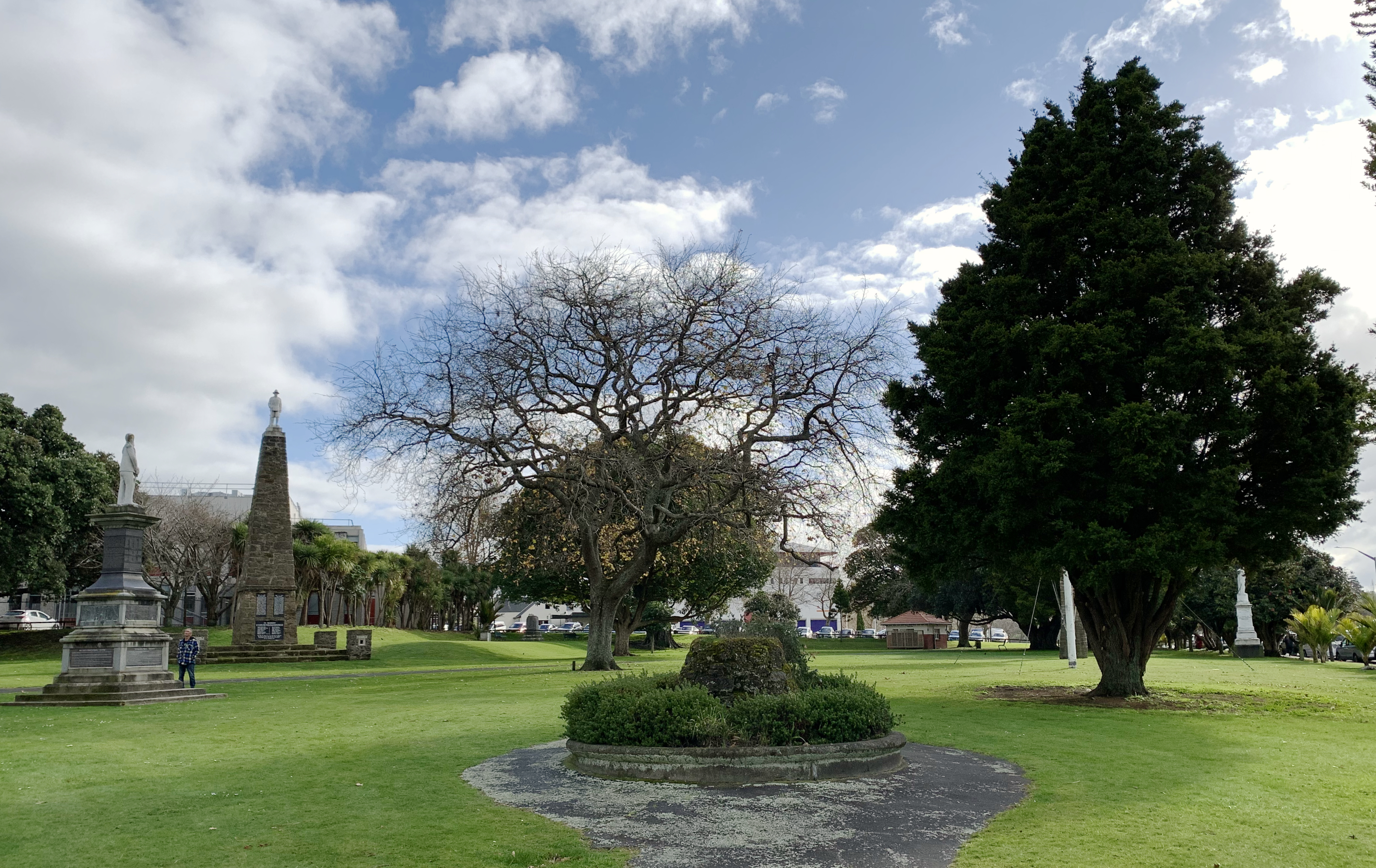
Moutoa Gardens in Whanganui. Seen in this photo: the Kemp Monument, the Māori War Memorial, the School Memorial and the Moutoa Monument.

For 79 days in 1995, people of the Whanganui tribes occupied historic Pākaitore (Moutoa Gardens), beside the river and within the city of Whanganui. This protest was resolved peaceably, and a tripartite agreement with government and local government has since been signed. At the heart of all this is the Whanganui tribes' claim to the river, which is still seen as both an ancestor and a source of material and spiritual sustenance. "We were forced to leave, and it shouldn't be lost on anybody that we upheld our dignity," protest leader Ken Mair told a press conference in Whanganui 18 May 1995 following the end of the occupation."

=== Takahue ===
The Whanganui occupation of Pākaitore inspired a group of Māori from Takahue a small Northland settlement to occupy the local schoolhouse. The several dozen protesters who have occupied the school since then are demanded that title to the land on which the school stands be returned to them. The 6 acres (24,000 m^{2}) they claimed were part of 4,500 acres (18 km^{2}) purchased by the government in 1875, in a transaction the protesters, descendants of the original owners, regard as invalid. The school has been closed since the mid-1980s and used as an army training camp and for community activities since then. Bill Perry, a spokesperson for the protesters, explained to reporters who visited the occupation on 22 April 1995 that the land they are claiming has been set aside in a government controlled Landbank together with other property in the region. This Landbank allegedly protects lands currently subject to claims under the Waitangi Tribunal from sale pending settlement of the claims. The occupation ended with mass arrests and the burning of the school. An article in the New Zealand Listener by Adam Gifford from 1995 describes the events and reactions from the community of the occupation and burning of the Takahue School.

=== Huntly ===
Huntly and the Waikato, New Zealand 1991

Another occupation inspired by Pākaitore began on 26 April 1995 in Huntly, a coal mining town south of Auckland. The block of land sits atop a hill overlooking the town, in full view of the mine entrance with its coal conveyor leading to a power station. Protesters told reporters who visited the occupation 29 April that the land is part of 1,200,000 acres (4,900 km^{2}) confiscated by the government 132 years ago from the Tainui tribe. It is now owned by Solid Energy, previously Coalcorp, a state-owned enterprise.

Those occupying the land are demanding its return to Ngāti Whawhakia, the local Māori sub-tribe. The claim includes coal and mineral rights. Robert Tukiri, chairman of Ngāti Whawhakia Trust and spokesperson for the occupation said, "We have got our backs to the wall. There is a housing shortage. We need to have houses." Tukiri opposed a NZ$170 million (NZ$1=US$0.67) deal between the government and the Tainui Māori Trust Board due to be signed 22 May as final settlement for the government's land seizures last century. The agreement will turn over 86,000 acres (350 km^{2}) of state-owned land to the trust board and NZ$65 million for further purchases of private land. "The Tainui Māori Trust Board stands to become the biggest landlord around, while 80 percent of our tribe rents their homes," Tukiri commented.

=== Ihumātao occupation ===
In November 2016, the activist group "Save Out Unique Landscape" (SOUL) led by Pania Newton occupied Oruarangi Bloc in Ihumātao, south of Auckland to protest the Government's plans to sell the section to Fletcher Housing to build social housing. The New Zealand Government had confiscated the land in 1867 after local Māori in South Auckland and Manukau Harbour fled south following the outbreak of the Waikato War in 1863. SOUL regarded the confiscation as a violation of the Treaty of Waitangi. Between 2016 and 2018, SOUL unsuccessfully appealed against Fletcher Building's plans to develop the Oruarangi Bloc to the Environment Court, the New Zealand Parliament, and the Mayor of Auckland Phil Goff.

On 23 July 2019, Police unsuccessfully attempted to evict the SOUL protesters, who continued to occupy the land throughout late July and August 2019. Protesters also picketed Fletcher Housing's headquarters in Penrose, Auckland. Solidarity protests were also held in Whangarei, Hamilton, Hastings, Palmerston North, Wellington, Christchurch, and Dunedin. In response to protest action, Prime Minister Jacinda Ardern announced that the Government would halt building plans in Ihumātao while Government and other parties negotiated a peaceful solution to the dispute.

In December 2020, the Government reached a deal with Fletcher Building to buy the disputed Ihumātao land for NZ$30 million for housing purposes. A steering committee consisting of the ahi kā (the occupiers), a Kīngitanga representative, and two representatives of the Crown would decide its use, with Auckland Council acting in an observer role. In April 2021, the Auditor General invalidated the Government's purchase of Ihumātao was unlawful on the grounds that it had used money from the Land for Housing Fund against Treasury's advice. To validate the purchase, the Government would have to pass legislation. As of July 2022, the Government had yet to appoint a steering committee and to make a decision on the future of the land.

== Foreshore and seabed ==
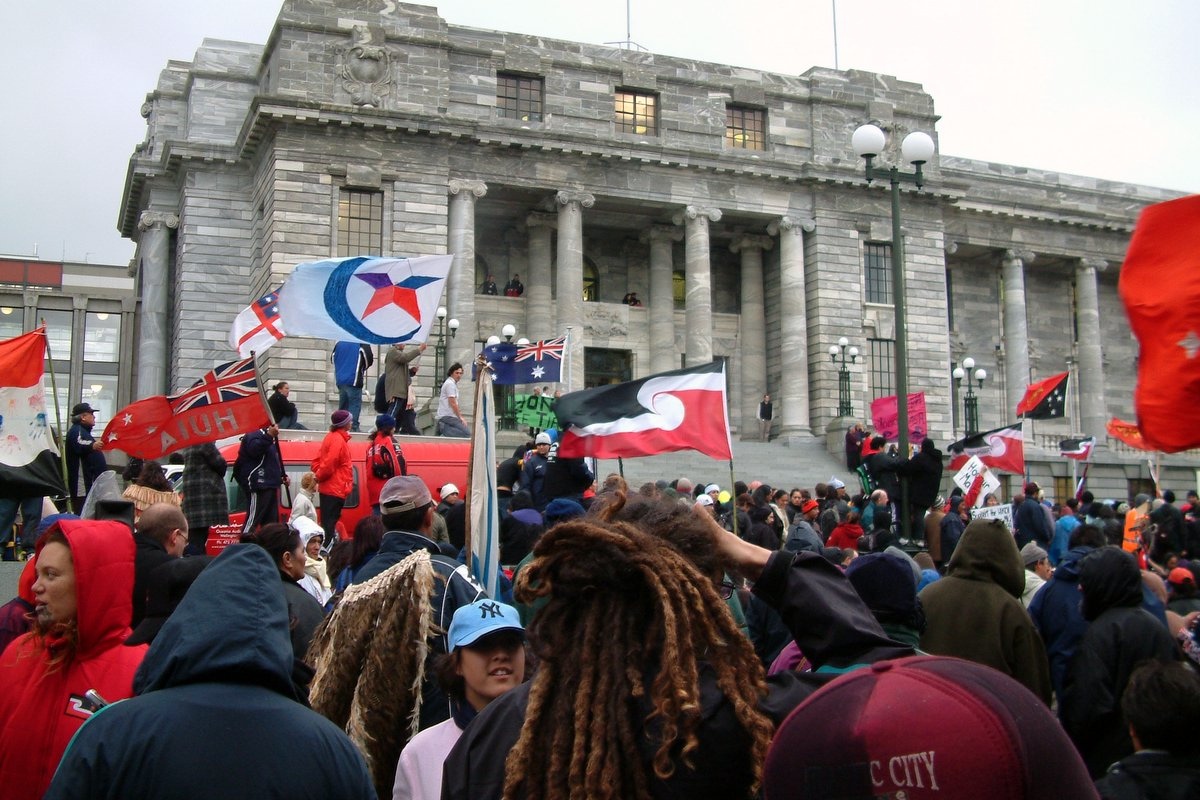
The foreshore and seabed hikoi outside Parliament

In 2003 the Court of Appeal ruled that Māori could seek customary title to areas of the New Zealand foreshore and seabed, overturning assumptions that such land automatically belonged to the Crown. The ruling alarmed many pākehā, and the Labour government proposed legislation removing the right to seek ownership of the foreshore and seabed. This angered many Māori who saw it as confiscation of land. Labour Party MP Tariana Turia was so incensed by the legislation that she eventually left the party and formed the Māori Party. In May 2004 a hīkoi (march) from Northland to Wellington, modeled on the 1975 land march but in vehicles, was held, attracting thousands of participants. Despite this, the legislation was passed later that year.

== Te Mana Motuhake o Tuhoe ==
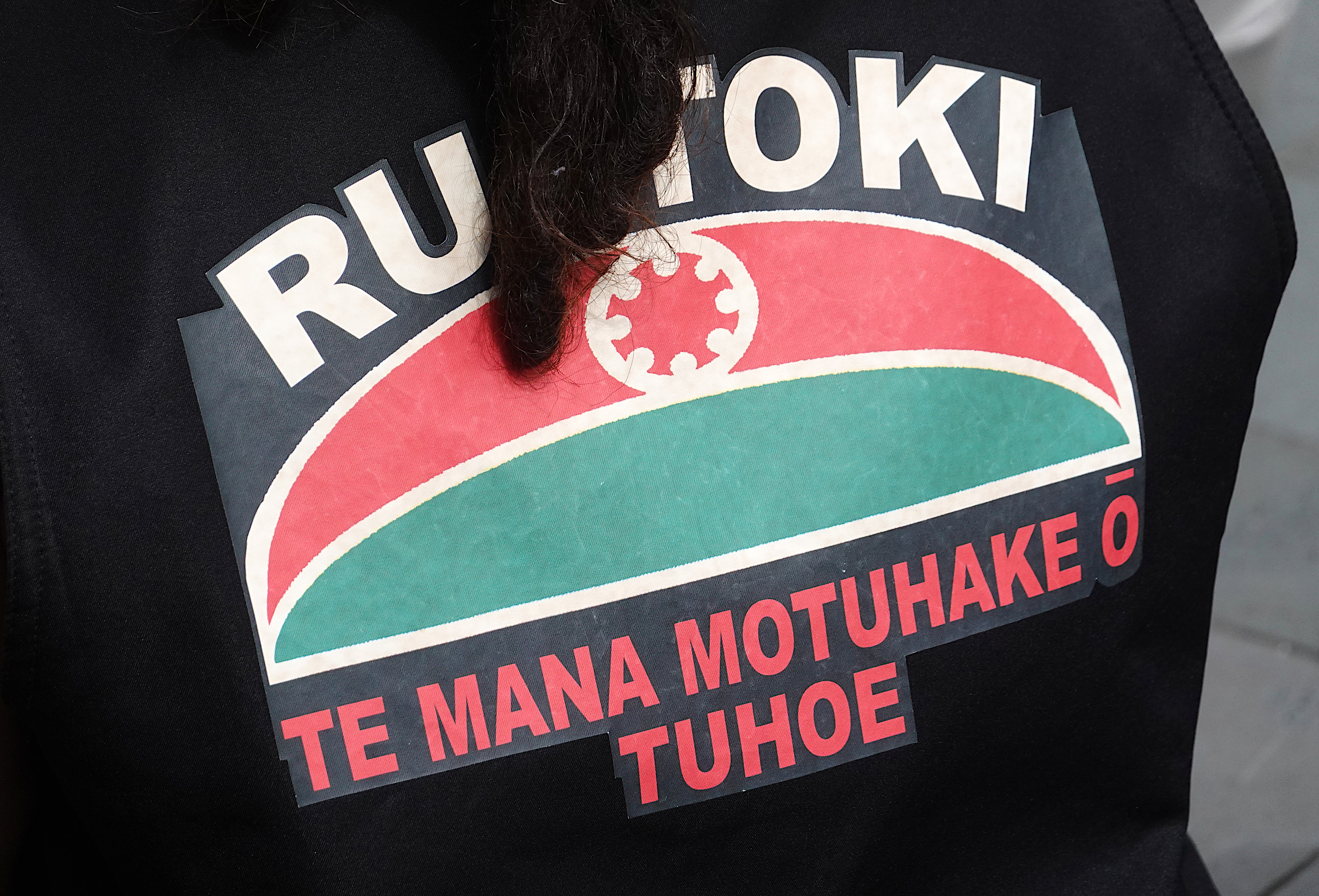
Te Mana Motuhake o Tuhoe patch worn during a protest march in Wellington on 6 February 2024

Te Mana Motuhake o Tuhoe is a group which includes the Tūhoe leader Tāme Iti. The group has held numerous campaigns highlighting the rights of the Tūhoe people. The ideology of the group is based on self-government as a base principle of democracy and that Tūhoe has the democratic right to self-government. Tūhoe were not signatories of the Treaty of Waitangi, and have always maintained a right to uphold uniquely Tūhoe values, culture, language and identity within their homelands.

=== Te Urupatu ===
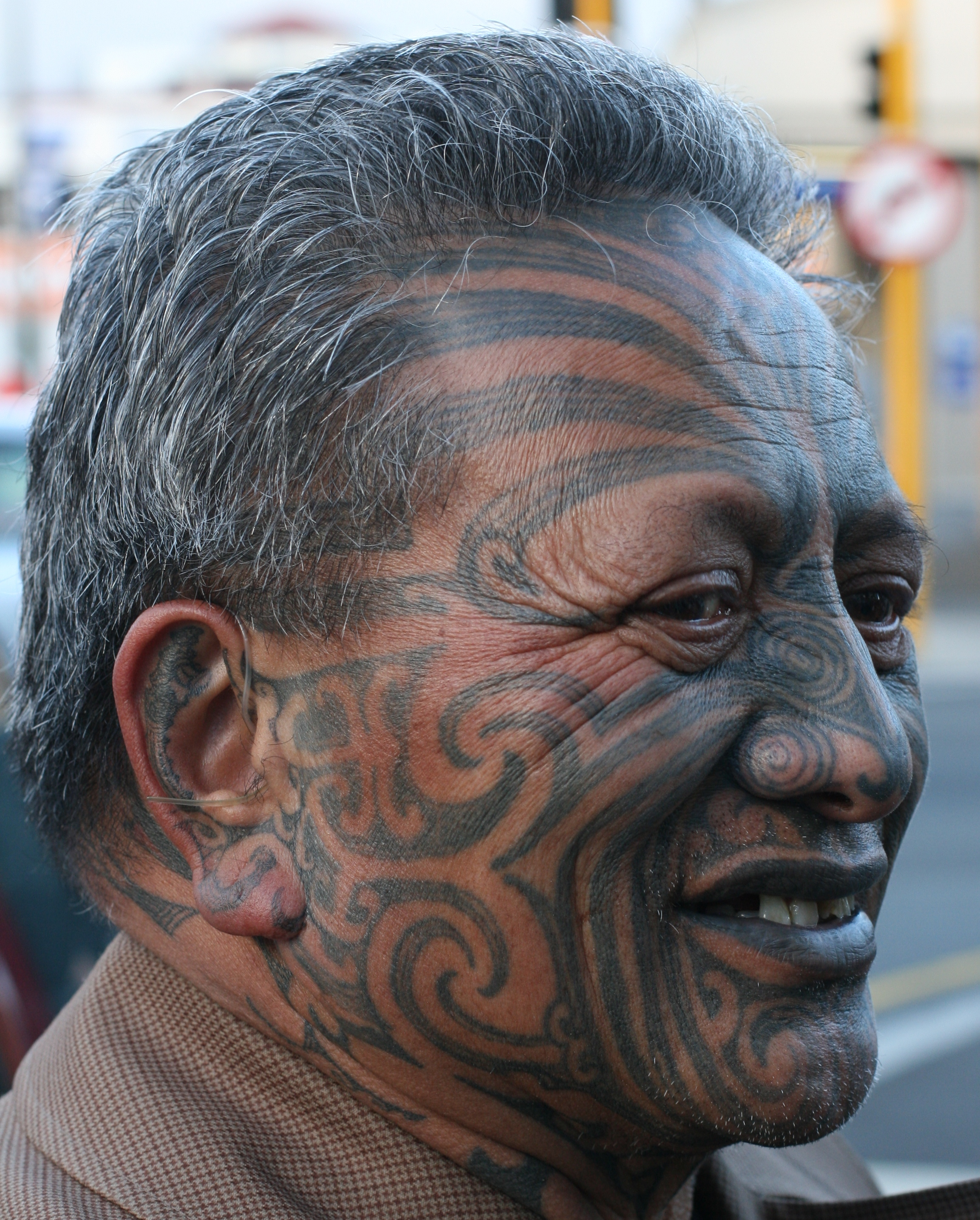
Tāme Iti at gallery opening 13 October 2009

On 16 January 2005 during a pōwhiri (or greeting ceremony) which formed part of a Waitangi Tribunal hearing, Iti fired a shotgun into a New Zealand flag in close proximity to a large number of people, which he explained was an attempt to recreate the 1860s East Cape War: "We wanted them to feel the heat and smoke, and Tūhoe outrage and disgust at the way we have been treated for 200 years". The incident was filmed by television crews but initially ignored by police. The matter was however raised in parliament, one opposition MP asking "why Tāme Iti can brandish a firearm and gloat about how he got away with threatening judges on the Waitangi Tribunal, without immediate arrest and prosecution".

The police subsequently charged Iti with discharging a firearm in a public place. His trial occurred in June 2006. Tāme Iti elected to give evidence in Māori (his native language), stating that he was following the Tūhoe custom of making noise with tōtara poles. Tūhoe Rangatira stated Iti had been disciplined by the tribe and protocol clarified to say discharge of a weapon in anger was always inappropriate (but stated that it was appropriate when honouring dead warriors, (in a manner culturally equivalent to the firing of a volley over a grave within Western cultures)). Judge Chris McGuire said "It was designed to intimidate unnecessarily and shock. It was a stunt, it was unlawful".

Judge McGuire convicted Iti on both charges and fined him. Iti attempted to sell the flag he shot on the TradeMe auction site to pay the fine and his legal costs, but the sale—a violation of proceeds of crime legislation—was withdrawn.

Iti lodged an appeal, in which his lawyer, Annette Sykes, argued that Crown Law did not stretch to the ceremonial area in front of a Marae's Wharenui. On 4 April 2007, the Court of Appeal of New Zealand overturned his convictions for unlawfully possessing a firearm. While recognising that events occurred in "a unique setting", the court did not agree with Sykes' submission about Crown law. However Justices Hammond, O'Regan and Wilson found that his prosecutors failed to prove beyond reasonable doubt that Iti's actions caused "requisite harm", under Section 51 of the Arms Act. The Court of Appeal described Iti's protest as "a foolhardy enterprise" and warned him not to attempt anything similar again.

=== Anti-terror raids ===
On Monday, 15 October 2007, several police raids were conducted across New Zealand in relation to the discovery of an alleged paramilitary training camp deep in the Urewera mountain range near the town of Ruatoki in the eastern Bay of Plenty.

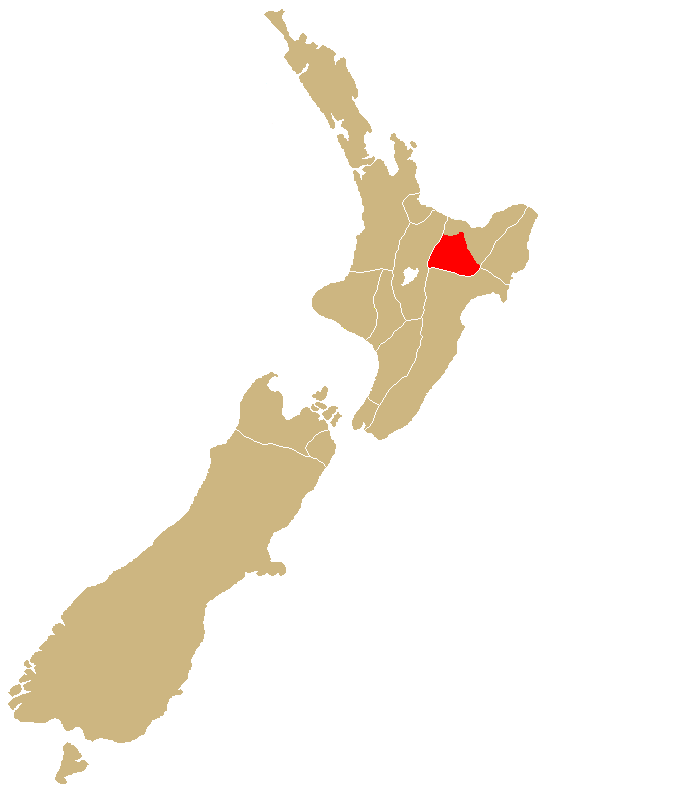
Approximate area of the Urewera mountain range.

About 300 police, including members of the Armed Offenders and anti-terror squads, were involved in the raids in which four guns and 230 rounds of ammunition were seized and 17 people arrested, all but one of them charged with firearms offences. According to police, the raids were a culmination of more than a year of surveillance that uncovered and monitored the training camps. Search warrants were executed under the Summary Proceedings Act to search for evidence relating to potential breaches of the Terrorism Suppression Act and the Arms Act.

On 29 October, police referred evidence gathered during the raids to the Solicitor-General to consider whether charges should be laid under the Terrorism Suppression Act. Authorisation for prosecutions under the Act is given by the Attorney-General though he has delegated this responsibility to Solicitor-General David Collins. On 8 November the Solicitor-General declined to press charges under the Terrorism Suppression Act, because of inadequacies of the legislation. According to Prime Minister Helen Clark, one of the reasons police tried to lay charges under anti-terror legislation was because they could not use telephone interception evidence in prosecutions under the Arms Act.

Activists that were arrested and raided are known supporters of Te Mana Motuhake o Tuhoe and came from diverse networks of environmental, anarchist and Māori activism.

==== Arrests and following court cases ====
A number of people were arrested in the raids, including Māori activist Tāme Iti, his nephews Rawiri Iti and Maraki Teepa, Māori anarchist Emily Bailey from Parihaka along with her twin brothers Ira and Rongomai, Rangi Kemara of Ngāti Maniapoto, Vietnam War veterans Tuhoe Francis Lambert and Moana Hemi Winitana also of Ngāi Tūhoe, Radical Youth anarchist Omar Hamed. Others included Marama Mayrick, who faces five firearms charges; Other defendants include Trudi Paraha, Phillip Purewa, Valerie Morse, Urs Peter Signer and Tekaumarua Wharepouri. Of the people arrested, at least 16 are facing firearms charges. Police also attempted to lay charges against 12 people under the Terrorism Suppression act, but the Solicitor General declined to prosecute for charges under the act. All charges against Rongomai Bailey were dropped in October 2008.

== Campaign to fly the Tino Rangatiratanga flag ==
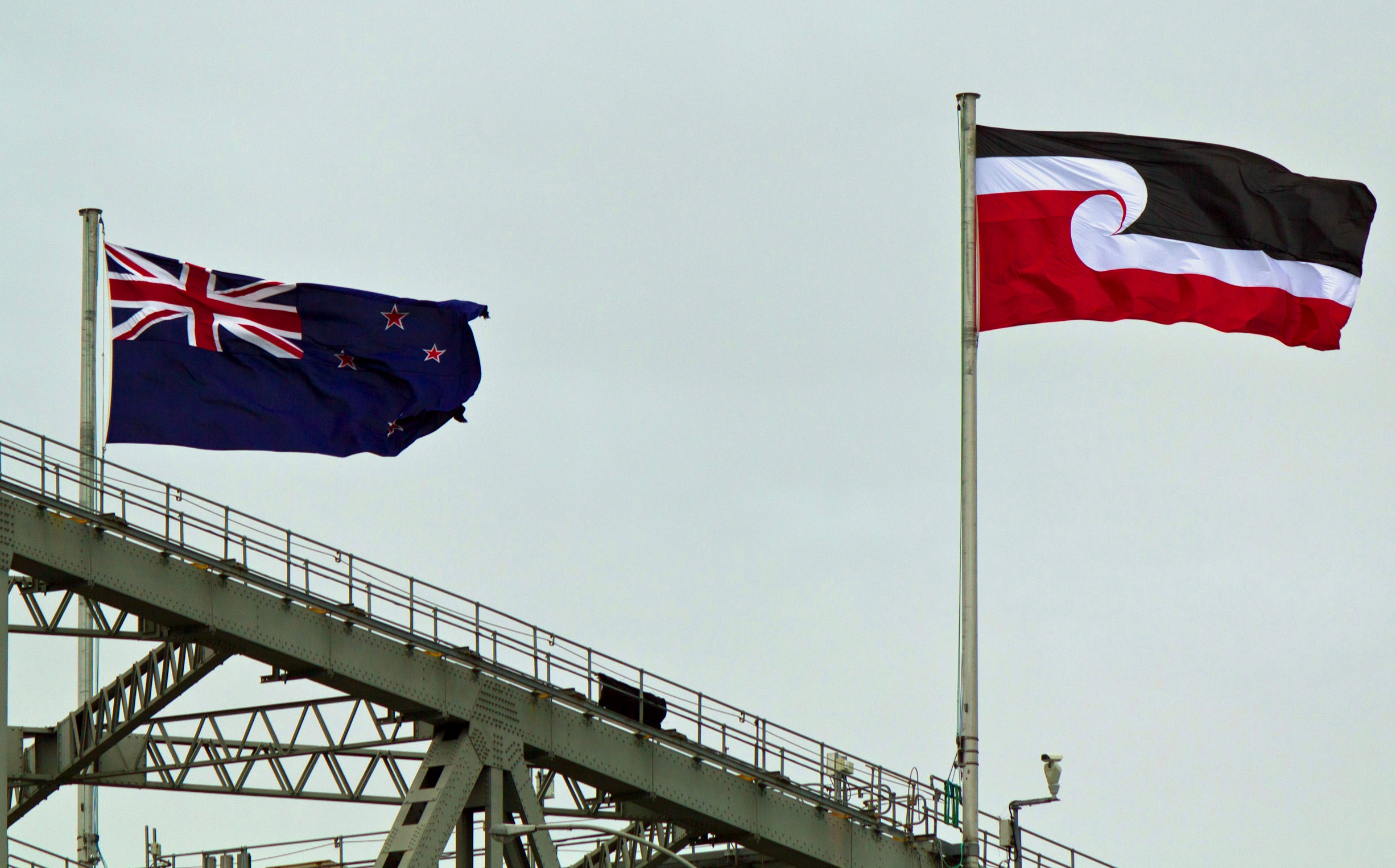
The national Māori (tino rangatiratanga) flag flying alongside the New Zealand flag on Auckland Harbour Bridge

The official recognition of the Tino Rangatiratanga flag was a campaign of indigenous-rights-advocacy group Te Ata Tino Toa. The group applied for permission for the Tino Rangatiratanga flag to be flown on the Auckland Harbour Bridge on Waitangi Day. After considerable debate in the public arena the group adopted various tactics to raise awareness of the issues, including lobbying Transit New Zealand and Parliament, submissions to the Human Rights Commission and holding an annual "Fly the Flag" competition, to more direct protest actions including bungee jumping off and traffic-jamming the Harbour Bridge, as well as flying the flag from the bridge. Spokespeople for the campaign included Tia Taurere and Teanau Tuiono.

In 2009 Prime Minister John Key and Māori Affairs Minister Pita Sharples announced that the Māori Tino Rangatiratanga flag has been chosen to fly from the Auckland Harbour Bridge and other official buildings (such as Premier House) on Waitangi Day.

== Role of Women ==
Little is known about Māori women's participation in society and government prior to European colonization. From what is known, women in many Māori tribes and nations had greater autonomy and power than European counterparts, and often negotiated with English missionaries. After European arrival to New Zealand, labour and social role became increasingly separate between men and women, and Māori women experienced heavier workloads. In the late 19th century many women were independent landowners but were denied representation and votes in the Te Kotahitanga, an independent Māori Parliament created in the late 19th century to advocate for greater Māori independence and rights. Meri Mangakāhia was the first woman to speak at the Māori Parliament, and was a strong advocate of Māori women's suffrage. Women formed inter-tribe committees called Ngā Kāmiti Wahin with the goal of increasing women's representation and suffrage in Parliament. These early female activists often relied on genealogical claims to chiefly power to give their activism authority.

The Māori independence movement in the mid-to-late 20th century is often considered to have started with the formation of the Māori Women's Welfare League. The League was formed to help the wellbeing of Māori women and children through education and health programs, as well as to hold the government accountable to reform and the Treaty of Waitangi. The Women's Welfare League acted, in many ways, as a centralized leadership of the Māori rights movement, and stayed at the forefront of government and policy reform. For many women, the League was one of the only places where they could freely and publicly exercise political power.

In the 1960s and 1970s, women became heavily involved in a number of other Māori-related political activist groups centred around issues like the Vietnam War, women's liberation, and preservation of Māori language. Māori feminism saw a large growth, and the intersection of anti-Māori racism and sexism became a predominant focus of much political activism. In 1993, a group of Māori women filed the Mana Wāhine (legal name: WAI 2700) claim alleging that the Crown had consistently violated the rights of Māori women over the course of European settlement. This claim was granted in 2018. Many women became prominent political leaders in the New Zealand government. As of 2026, the New Zealand House of Representatives has 61 female members, many of whom are Māori. The world's first openly transgender MP was Georgina Bayer, a Māori woman.

== See also ==
- List of protests in New Zealand
- Polynesian Panthers
