= CCRE =

CCRE may refer to:

- CCRE-CEMR, Council of European Municipalities and Regions
- Canadian Council for Research in Education
- Caribbean Coral Reef Ecosystems Program
