= The Fern and the Tiki =

Book about New Zealand

- Author: Ausubel, David Paul
- Genre: Social life and customs; National characteristics of New Zealand
- Set in: New Zealand
- Publisher: [Sydney] N.S.W. : Angus and Robertson
- Publication date: 1960
- Pages: 232

The Fern and the Tiki is a book by American psychologist David Ausubel, written during his Fulbright Research Fellowship in New Zealand in 1957/58. Subtitled An American View of New Zealand National Character, Social Attitudes and Race Relations, the book critically examines how New Zealanders' self-image aligned with the ideal personality traits of the country's national character at the time. Building on ideas from Ausubel's earlier research in New Zealand, and followed by a psycho-ethnological study of Māori youth, The Fern and the Tiki concludes that the perception held by many Pākehā of themselves as egalitarian New Zealanders living in a country with excellent race relations was a myth. At the time of publication, this and other criticisms in the book of child-rearing and education in the country sparked considerable controversy and left a lasting impact on how students, academics, and policymakers discuss and respond to the treatment of Māori by the predominantly Pākehā culture, as well as other social issues.

== Background and context ==
In 1957 Ausubel was awarded a Fulbright Research Grant to study in New Zealand. He was welcomed to Victoria University of Wellington by Professor Ernest Beaglehole, who was said to be looking for an eminent scholar to "address the disparities between Māori and Pākehā" and provide an "outsider's perspective [that] would stimulate an open and reasoned discourse on race relations". As a result, Ausubel's research resulted in several articles and books including The Fern and the Tiki and later, Māori Youth.

His first publication in New Zealand was an article in Landfall Journal entitled Race Relations in New Zealand: Māori and Pākehā—an American View. Early in the article, Ausubel asserted that in believing there was no colour bar, racial prejudice, or discrimination, and that Māori enjoy complete equality with Europeans, New Zealanders held "an unwarrantedly sanguine view of the race relations in [the] country." One piece in the local media quoted Ausubel's conclusion in the article:

"There can be no escape from facing the unpalatable fact that by any reasonable or objective standard, an extra-legal colour bar does exist in New Zealand. For as long as New Zealanders persist in deluding themselves that all is well in the sphere of race relations, the only realistic prospect for the future is the emergence of a brown proletariat segregated in the urban slums and living in a state of chronic tension with their white neighbours."

A later commentator noted that at the time there was surprisingly little response from a "small elite audience of intellectuals and academics that might be expected to react to a disquieting analysis of their society". Some letters in one media outlet were bemused by, or took offense at, Ausubel's comments about race relations in the country, but the same newspaper later followed with a piece stating that now the issue had been raised, it must be faced and dealt with. A Māori leader disagreed with Ausubel's claim that "racial antagonisms...[in the country]...were potentially dangerous".

Ausubel continued commenting on other issues in New Zealand society, including a criticism of single-sex schools in the country. He claimed these schools were "remiss in [their] responsibilities... [by not]...developing men and women to interact normally with persons of the opposite sex." His views on education received coverage in The Birmingham Post, however Clarence Beeby, the Director of Education in New Zealand, stated there was no evidence to support Ausubel's claim that co-education was a likely cause of delinquency. A senior lecturer at Victoria University challenged "the sweeping denial" of what Ausubel said of New Zealand schools, noting that he was "an authority of international standing" whose views could only be disproved by valid research methods. Ausubel widened the debate later by suggesting that New Zealanders' attitude toward conformity reflected "over-bearing and heavy-handed authority at home and in schools...[resulting in]...an over-reliance on authority and not enough on self-discipline".

== Publication and methodology ==
Although Ausubel was back in the United States by this time, The Fern and the Tiki was published in 1960. The preface notes that Ausubel's expertise lay in his training as a psychiatrist and psychologist, specifically focused on education issues, personality development, and social relationships. For this work, he gathered data from observations, formal and informal interviews, and "specially designed personality tests." The aim of the book was "to present an objective and critical analysis of important problems facing the people of New Zealand, such as discipline, coeducation, conformity, standards of public controversy, juvenile delinquency, and the improvement of Māori-Pākehā relations". The primary focus was on Pākehā, with Māori characteristics considered only in the context of New Zealand race relations. This involved describing the attitudes and characteristics of Pākehā New Zealanders, particularly their self-perception, interactions with others, and responses to societal issues.

Ausubel's frame of reference for the book is based on his American experience and includes direct comparisons between the two cultures, and examples of the American 'visitor'—either in the third person or as Ausubel himself—encountering a self-image among New Zealanders that was "markedly at variance with the visitor's observations." He concedes that, as an outsider, his views could be problematic but argues that this perspective allows for a fresh point of view on issues resulting in "fewer blind spots than [the] hosts about the local species of sacred cows". Early in the book, he notes that adopting a critical approach requires an awareness of the influence previous writings may have had on the host country influencing how they receive and process criticism. It is suggested that "criticism crossing cultural boundaries may be considered proper if it is fair, reasoned, objective, and within the observer's realm of competence".

A key element in Ausubel's gathering of data for this work was the importance he attributed to analysing the degree that a "national character...[which]...identifies the ideal personality traits of a culture...actually corresponds to the national self-portrait". He asserts that this assists the researcher to manage understandably sensitive responses to opinions by an outsider of a nation's "cherished self-images". In the epilogue, the validity of the concept of national character is examined. Ausubel argues that it differs from national stereotypes, which he describes as "naïve overstatements that recognize no individual differences between the inhabitants of a country...[and]...reflect a notoriously biased selection of data." Consequently, national character was considered more scientific, based on "precise and systematic observation...[and]...free of prejudice and hearsay evidence." To maintain objectivity he approached the people without preconceptions, and his impressions "were derived empirically from actual experience untainted by a pre-existing national stereotype."

In the preface to the American Edition (1965), Ausubel claims that his belief "national character is primarily a product of the distinctive history, values, customs, traditions and institutions of a particular nation" differs from the commonly held psychoanalytic view that it resulted from child-rearing practices.

Ausubel concedes some "methodological limitations" involved in gathering data for the section on race relations in New Zealand. Specifically, the interviews were informal, and most of the participating Pākehā and Māori, from a wide range of backgrounds, were unaware they were being interviewed on this topic. The discussions were transcribed privately. There is an acknowledged lack of "representativeness of sampling [and] standardisation of content"; however, Ausubel maintains that it yielded "richer, more spontaneous, and less camouflaged data" than some surveys, where participants often sought to make a favourable impression on the interviewer. He concludes that "no claim [could] be made that these data reflect[ed] a definitive, adequately controlled, or representative cross-section of New Zealand opinion on race relations".

The discussion of New Zealanders' attitudes toward race relations was underpinned by the concept of colour prejudice that was relevant to the New Zealand experience. Ausubel argues that this prejudice originated during the era when European colonial powers were exploiting, enslaving, and mistreating indigenous peoples. To justify these actions, a theory emerged suggesting that people of colour possessed inferior intelligence and lower morality, making it seem inconsequential to deprive them of their "life, land, and liberty." This doctrine often softened once the political and economic objectives of colonization were realized. Influenced by democracy, missionary activity, and humanitarian ideals, it relied on the racial group in question being small enough not to threaten the dominant European population. Many still believed in the inherent superiority of white-skinned individuals, viewing "the white man's burden" as an obligation to improve the living and educational standards of the natives while ensuring continued profit from their labour. Based on this theory, Ausubel describes a "modern colour bar—a modified system of colonialism where people of colour gained varying degrees of political and legal equality but were still relegated to an inferior social and economic status through various forms of extra-legal discrimination". He suggests an historical paradigm for race relations in New Zealand that is very similar to this model. In the final chapter, Ausubel unpacks several rationalizations that have been used to justify colour prejudice in New Zealand. As a result of stereotypes about behaviour, Māori were placed at a serious disadvantage compared to Pākehā as they had to first prove they did not possess the traits commonly attributed to their race before being accepted.

== Format and key ideas ==
Three chapters of the book explore the national character of New Zealanders. Ausubel identified a "blend of British and pioneering traits...[including]...the perceived virtues of both traditions and the vices of neither". In valuing their British heritage, New Zealanders see themselves as "reserved, unsentimental, respectful of authority, mindful of discipline, and prone to understatement". Instead of "British snobbishness, arrogance, haughty condescension and patronizing airs", the national image is one of "genial friendliness and an amiable, easygoing egalitarianism". Ausubel acknowledges that some of this was valid, but claims New Zealanders show considerable sentimentality in their choice of movies, often write "maudlin" in-memoriam notices, watch "gushingly sentimental" movies and participate in very emotional farewell ceremonies. He further questions whether New Zealanders are as friendly and hospitable as their self-image proclaimed. A "strong undercurrent of hostility toward foreigners" is noted, reflected in the resentment toward Americans, with Ausubel concluding that "the tide of anti-American feeling among the rank and file of New Zealanders today is probably stronger than ever before in history." Ausubel was surprised by how personally accountable he was held by "elderly gentlemen" for the behavior of American servicemen, [who] "dated New Zealand girls during World War II while they were risking their lives in the North African campaign." Ausubel also found it perplexing how rarely New Zealanders asked him to share knowledge about his home country, instead "parading all of their distorted notions and misconceptions about the United States gleaned from the latest picture magazines and Hollywood productions."

Ausubel was puzzled by adult New Zealanders' apathy and lack of enthusiasm toward work, despite their physical activity in sports, gardening, and home projects. Although their self-image reflects frontier values of efficiency, ambition, and enterprise, he notes they lack urgency in pursuing vocational goals, concluding that New Zealanders have "less drive and eagerness to get ahead and advance in their jobs than is typical of Americans." It is suggested that the principles of the Welfare State, which embody the egalitarian ideal of preventing inequities due to privilege, may have inadvertently undermined "the respectability of occupational achievement and establish an undifferentiated scale of rewards for effort and ability." New Zealand parents are said to have not placed high value on the vocational achievement of their children, who often left school lacking "genuinely internalized needs for vocational achievement."

Two chapters critically examine race relations in the country and while Ausubel concedes that these are generally better than many other countries, including the United States, they are not as good as New Zealanders claim. It is suggested that the American visitor, accustomed to racism in their own country, would be most disturbed by how uncritically New Zealanders accept "the unvalidated national belief regarding racial equality" and their reluctance to face unpalatable facts. He suggests that the real issue is "the national self-delusion which blocks recognition of the existence of a problem and thereby renders impossible the adoption of appropriate preventive and remedial measures".. According to the author, this stems from New Zealanders not grasping the difference between the apparent equality that Māori had "in the eyes of the law" and the reality that, due to "bigotry and intolerance," they were still discriminated against in areas such as housing, employment, or simply being welcomed into the homes of Pākehā.

Ausubel discusses examples of discriminatory practices against Māori to support his claim that New Zealand has a colour bar. He asserts that authorities refuse to address "the shockingly sub-standard state of Māori housing." He also highlights the difficulties Māori face in obtaining hotel accommodation and, at times, being required to sit in segregated parts of cinemas. Additionally, he points out the reluctance of employers to hire Māori in "the skilled trades, offices, shops, and banks." Furthermore, he provides examples of anti-Māori sentiments from educators, some of whom believe it is a waste of time and money to send Māori children to post-primary school.

The book examines Māori attitudes towards Pākehā, portraying their wariness as a justified response rooted in historical experiences and "an indispensable self-protective device that every cultural minority must learn if it is to survive". Ausubel claims that Māori recognize skin colour as a marker of an outsider, but there is no implication that white skin inherently signifies "racial inferiority". Acknowledged stereotypes held by Māori towards Pākehā are not seen "as related to any fixed assumptions regarding inherent racial traits or innate racial inferiority" and not amounting to discrimination, given the power dynamics favouring Pākehā in society.

Ausubel expresses a "pessimism about the future", reflecting what he perceives as the tendency of New Zealanders to not recognise and address social problems such as race relations. He claims that this is in spite of "the impressive measure of legal equality enjoyed by Māori", some extra-legal equality "based on the long standing tradition of fair play and on the experience of almost a hundred years of peaceful co-existence", and the increased number of Māori "increasing their self-respect and raising their status in the eyes of their Pākehā neighbours" through becoming qualified in trades, teaching, nursing and farming. He notes that there are internationally recognised ways of "promoting more harmonious race relations that are relevant to the New Zealand experience," while concluding: "The most important step in improving Māori-Pākehā relations...is to overcome the prevailing complacency and self-deception about the situation."

== Reception ==
A 1960 review in Landfall said the book had a "jaundiced undercurrent...[and]...it is obvious that [Ausebel's] disappointment in and his disillusionment about New Zealand unset him bitterly". The reviewer said Ausubel seemed unaware how to approach people in the country and what he saw as smugness, "may be in fact a mask for sincere and considerable feelings of inferiority - and in a small bourgeois country, a feeling of nakedness". A later commentator suggested that the position taken by Smithells reflected how New Zealanders felt about the book as late as 2002 in that if "he [Ausubel] had limited himself to Māori-Pākehā relationships and not risked insulting New Zealanders' culture, his work would have been better received".

Kemble Welch, a senior pathologist at Whangarei Hospital who had worked for many years amongst Maori communities, said Ausubel's conclusion that New Zealand's colour bar was "so big and baneful" that there was reason to be pessimistic about the country's future, was difficult to be tested using scientific methodology. Welch called the reliability of the data gathered by Ausubel into question due to the fact that [he] "does not refer to any other reports or statistics, so relies entirely on his conversations with others", noting in conclusion that Ausubel himself acknowledged that the data did not "reflect a definitive, adequately controlled or representative cross-section of New Zealand opinion on race relations".

Cyril Belshaw said the book was a "criticism...[rather than]...a detached and systematic analysis of national character" and while "well written and clear...is spoiled by failing to conceal the emotion which lies behind it, by over-statement and inaccuracy". The reviewer concluded however that the book contained Ausubel's honestly held opinions with a "refreshing forthrightness which reveals the writer as very human and sincere".

An article in the Christchurch Press cited directly from the book key claims regarding New Zealanders' attitudes towards various social issues, following Ausubel's assertion that they [were] "conditioned to dismiss all critical appraisals of their country as the presumptuous and misinformed utterances of just another of those loud-mouthed Americans who got off the ship three days ago, had a quick look around Auckland and Rotorua, and is now telling us how to manage our affairs."

Another reviewer said that although some of Ausubel's comments were "plausible enough", he needed to be a more relaxed observer of the country's culture and if he had shown a sense of humour in interpreting and appreciating "the peculiarly ludicrous features of the human comedy of our society, we might have had something to learn from him".

The Honolulu Star-Bulletin said Ausubel had presented "a bold and forthright criticism of the New Zealander's character, the welfare state and the country's sacred cow -race relations", while The Edmonton Journal noted that in an election year, the book had generated a "hot national debate amongst many thinking people in government, business and education on where the nation [was] heading".

A reviewer in the Weekly Examiner stated that Ausubel had "put New Zealanders under the microscope...[finding them]...hostile, resentful and bigoted toward other nations...[and lacking]...friendliness, accessibility and hospitality". The correspondent was in no doubt that New Zealanders would by infuriated by the section on race relations but suggested it "may help them take a fresh look at themselves.

H. B. Hawthorn said that while he had personally seen all that was reported in the book, he suggested "agreement on manifest facts is not sufficient for a study of national character", and if Ausubel's reporting did meet some of the requirements of "clear standards of comparison and assessment...frequency, quantity, and the precise identity of actions generally elude the reader of The Fern and the Tiki". The reviewer did acknowledge that the sections on race relations in the country however, could "help in altering either the myth or reality" in this area of New Zealand life".

== Legacy ==
Interviewed in 2000, Geoffrey Palmer clearly recalled from his student days that the book had been very controversial but significant in shaping his consciousness, while Moana Jackson said that as a young Māori at the time, the content had not surprised him, and the challenging of Pākehā myths in the book was a forerunner of later more public critiquing of these by Māori.

Writing in 2002, Harry Kersey, who later worked in New Zealand as a Fulbright Scholar examining the Maori issues in the country's politics, noted how consistently the book is cited in other publications about race relations in the country. In 1999, New Zealand, historians Paul Spoonley and Augie Fleras claimed Ausubel was accurate in predicting that race relations would only be put to the test when the two races had more contact with each other, and concluded that the book inferred antagonism was not provoked by "uppity Maori" in the 1970s, rather being "deeply rooted in New Zealand history and chronically embedded in society".

James Ritchie reflected on his research into the nature of prejudice in New Zealand during the 1950s and said that Ausubel's work had "filled out the details." Richie noted that Ausubel had controversially compared the country to the southern states of America, and his view that race relations in New Zealand had been shaped more by "fortunate circumstances rather than widespread enlightenment" were shared by later historians.

Eddie Durie is said to have admired the book and wrote in 1991, that although Ausubel's work was not a recent publication it had [drawn] "attention to the wide disparity in Māori and Pākehā perspectives" on the rights of Māori under the Treaty of Waitangi.

Kersey suggested that the most severe criticism in the book is reserved for the child-rearing and discipline methods used in New Zealand. He noted that Ausubel struggled to understand how a society professing to be so radically egalitarian, still adhered to a Victorian system of discipline, especially corporal punishment in the homes and schools. The Final Report of the Royal Commission of Inquiry into Abuse in Care in New Zealand (2024), cited Ausubel in the section on societal attitudes that were relevant during the inquiry period. Specifically the report noted that in The Fern and the Tiki the author had concluded that during the late 1950s, as a result of "overly strict discipline" and a punitive approach toward adolescent misbehavior, "New Zealanders did not seem to value an open, warm relationships with children and young people and that their rights and dignity were not respected".

In 1965, Ausubel published Maori youth: a psychoethnological study of cultural deprivation. The work continued the theme of Pākehā New Zealanders practising racial discrimination and the Guardian stated that this book reiterated Ausubel's thesis that "colour prejudice is not only deeply ingrained and increasing in the Pākehā population as a whole but its existence is categorically denied by both the people and the Government of New Zealand". The Christchurch Press identified specifically the research that had been carried out at several New Zealand schools addressing the issues that impacted the "vocational and educational aspirations of Māori youth". The research showed that the typical Māori youth who generally lived in communities with poor housing and a range of social issues related to parenting, urban drift, truancy, delinquency and bad race relations, reported that he "perceived his parents as less demanding of high marks...and reported receiving less help and prodding about his homework than Pākehā pupils did". It was noted in the New Zealand media that Ausubel, in support of raising the standard of Māori education to reduce the "barrier to the integration of the two races", had donated the royalties of this book to the Maori Education Foundation, a government body set up to "lessen the disparity between Maori and European educational standards".

Concluding his article Opening a Discourse on Race Relations in New Zealand: The Fern and the Tiki revisited (2002) Kersey wrote:

Despite the furore surround David P. Ausubel's writings nearly half a century ago, his message had resonance for a generation of New Zealanders of both races that looked to a future of justice and bicultural harmony. Thus it is now generally acknowledged that The Fern and the Tiki will be remembered as the provocative little book that played a limited but significant role - alongside Dame Whina Cooper's land march, the occupation of Bastion Point and the Springbok tour protests - in forever changing the social and political landscape of Aotearoa-New Zealand."
