= Eva Rickard =

New Zealand rights activist and community leader (1925–1997)

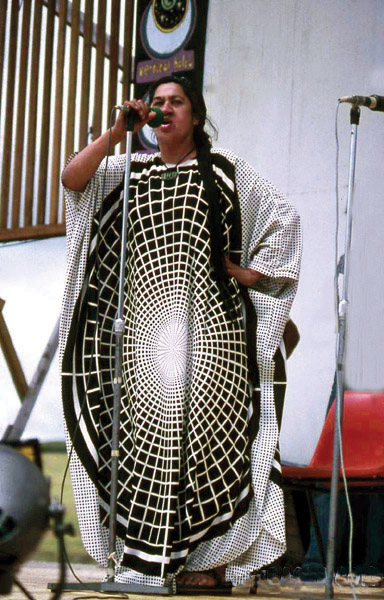
Rickard campaigning for land rights at Nambassa in 1979

Tuaiwa Hautai "Eva" Rickard (née Kereopa; 19 April 1925 – 6 December 1997) was a New Zealand activist for Māori land rights and for women's rights within Māoridom. Her methods included public civil disobedience and she is best known for leading the occupation of the Raglan golf course in the 1970s.

== Biography ==
Tuaiwa Hautai Kereopa was born at Te Kōpua, Raglan on 19 April 1925. She was the eighth of 15 children born to Riria Rāpana and Honehone Kereopa. She attended Raglan Primary School where she was given the English name 'Eva' and was forbidden from speaking te reo Māori.

Eva Rickard was most notably regarded for her decade long, very public civil disobedience campaigns to have ancestral lands alongside Raglan harbour returned to the local tribes and Māori mana (power, effectiveness) and culture recognised. During the Second World War, the New Zealand Government took land from indigenous Māori owners by acquisition for the purpose of a military airfield. The land was not returned to the Tainui Awhiro peoples following the war; instead, a 62-acre (250,000 m^{2}) block was turned into a public Raglan golf course in 1969.

Throughout the 1970s Rickard campaigned to raise public awareness about Māori land rights. After attempting to reoccupy this ancestral indigenous land in 1978, she was arrested for trespass along with another 19 Māori protesters on the ninth hole of the Raglan golf course. This incident was captured by New Zealand television. Their court appearances led to the return of the indigenous land. After the land was returned, it became a focus for local job-training and employment programs, as well as a focus for the Māori sovereignty movement.

The Mana Māori Movement was the largest wholly Māori political party, founded by Rickard, and contested the 2002 New Zealand general election. Mana Māori incorporated the smaller Te Tawharau and Piri Wiri Tua parties. Rickard was originally a member of Mana Motuhake, another Māori party, but quit when Mana Motuhake joined the Alliance (a broad left-wing coalition).

Rickard was an ardent advocate for women's rights within Māoridom and encouraged other female activists to ignore traditional Māori protocol by calling for Māori women to speak at official Māori gatherings, including on the marae. At her official tangi (funeral) where she was interred on the land she had spent a decade fighting to have returned to her people, Māori activist Annette Sykes when attempting to speak, had to endure cries of "you sit down, you have no right to speak." Here Annette Sykes stood up and publicly challenged men to recognise the mana of Māori women.

== See also ==
- Māori Party
- Angeline Greensill
- Raglan
- Tainui
- Māori protest movement
- Bastion Point
- Land rights
- Protest

== Other sources ==
- Obituary in New Zealand Herald of 9 December 1997 page A16
- Eva Rickard and other Māori activists on Radio New Zealand's Treaty of Waitangi- Te Tiriti o Waitangi Focus program, describing their long campaigns for Māori land rights and self-determination.
- Eva Rickards' letter to the Queen of the United Kingdom, 13 September 1995.
