= Angeline Greensill =

New Zealand Māori political rights campaigner, academic and leader

Angeline Ngahina Greensill (born 1948) is a New Zealand Māori political rights campaigner, academic and leader.

== Early life ==
Greensill is of Tainui, Ngāti Porou, and Ngāti Paniora descent, born in the late 1940s in Hamilton and raised at Raglan, on the turangawaewae of Tainui o Tainui ki Whaingaroa. She was educated at Raglan Primary, Raglan District High School, Hamilton Technical College, Hamilton Teachers College and at Waikato University. She holds a Trained Teachers Certificate, LLB (Bachelor of Laws), Bachelor of Social Sciences with 1st class Honours and completed a Masters of Social Science in 2010, with a thesis on the Resource Management Act, supervised by Robyn Longhurst.

Greensill's first job was as a primary school teacher both in New Zealand and in Brisbane. Between 1984–1996 while raising her young family, she worked for her hapū as co-ordinator of employment and skills training and conservation programmes for youth in the Raglan Catchment area. After completing a law degree she was employed by University of Waikato in 1999 to teach in the Department of Geography, Tourism and Environmental Planning specialising in treaties, Māori geography and resource management.

== The environment ==
As an advocate for the protection of the environment and for Maori land rights of West Coast whānau and hapu in the Whaingaroa area since the mid-70s, Greensill's legal efforts have been crucial in helping to block human-cow transgenic field trials being conducted by AgResearch Ltd, and helped to educate Māori communities on the implications of genetic engineering. Due to her expertise in this field she was interviewed in the documentary film The Leech and the Earthworm by Max Pugh and Marc Silver.

== Land rights ==
Greensill assisted in organising the land occupation at the Raglan Golf Course (see Māori protest movement), which played a prominent role in helping recognise issues around Māori land rights in New Zealand. Greensill was with her mother, Eva Rickard, when she was arrested on charges of trespassing. Due to prolonged legal efforts the land was later returned to the local tribe. Greensill was also involved in land occupations at Bastion Point, Awhitu, and others elsewhere.

== Political background ==
Ranked third, she stood in the 1999 election in the Port Waikato electorate for the Mana Māori Movement but was unsuccessful. Greensill was one of the final co-leaders of the Mana Māori Movement, which she called into recess in 2005 so that the combined efforts of that party could be utilised in the founding and promoting of the Māori Party. In the past Greensill supported Māori political party Mana Motuhake. One policy Greensill has advocated for is the recognition in law of the 1835 Declaration of Independence.

Greensill unsuccessfully stood for the Māori Party in the Maori electorates of Tainui and Hauraki-Waikato in the New Zealand general elections of 2005 and 2008 respectively. In 2011, however, she joined the breakaway Mana Party, saying that the Māori Party was no longer listening to the people. She contested the Hauraki-Waikato electorate again for her new party in the 2011 and 2014 elections.

== See also ==
- Māori Party
- Eva Rickard
- Raglan
- Tainui
- Māori protest movement
- Bastion Point
- Land rights
- Protest
