= Floyd Robinson (disambiguation) =

Floyd Robinson (born 1936) is a former Major League Baseball outfielder.

Floyd Robinson may also refer to:

- Floyd G. Robinson (born 1931), teacher, education theorist and curriculum developer
- Floyd Robinson (singer) (1932–2016), American country singer
