= David Ausubel =

American psychologist

David Paul Ausubel
- Born: October 25, 1918; New York City, New York, United States
- Died: July 9, 2008 (aged 89)
- Education: Columbia University
- Known for: Advance Organizers
- Awards: E. L. Thorndike Award (1977)
- Scientific career
- Fields: Psychology, Educational Psychology

David Paul Ausubel (October 25, 1918 – July 9, 2008) was an American psychologist. His most significant contribution to the fields of educational psychology, cognitive science, and science education learning was on the development and research on "advance organizers" (see below) since 1960.

== Biography ==
=== Family ===
He was born on October 25, 1918, and grew up in Brooklyn, New York. He was nephew of the Jewish historian Nathan Ausubel. Ausubel and his wife Pearl had two children.

=== Education and academic career ===
Ausubel studied at the University of Pennsylvania where he graduated with honors in 1939, receiving a bachelor's degree majoring in psychology. Ausubel later graduated from medical school in 1943 at Middlesex University where he went on to complete a rotating internship at Gouverneur Hospital, located on the Lower East Side of Manhattan, New York. Ausubel earned his M.A. and Ph.D. in developmental psychology from Columbia University in 1950. He served with the US Public Health service, worked in Germany after World War Two in the medical treatment of displaced persons and as a psychiatrist in Veterans Administration hospitals.

In 1957 he won a Fulbright Research Grant to study in New Zealand. During that period his most noteworthy publication was The Fern and the Tiki, in which he made several controversial claims that Māori people were discriminated against in the country.

Ausubel continued to hold a series of professorships at several schools of education, including University of Illinois (1950-1966), University of Toronto (1966-1968) and the City University of New York, where he stayed until his retirement.

=== Psychiatrist ===
In 1973, Ausubel retired from academic life and devoted himself to his psychiatric practice. During his psychiatric practice, Ausubel published many books as well as articles in psychiatric and psychological journals. In 1976, he received the Thorndike Award from the American Psychological Association for "Distinguished Psychological Contributions to Education".

=== Author ===
In 1994, at the age of 75, Ausubel retired from professional life to devote himself full-time to writing. He then published four books:

- Ego development and Psychopathology (1996),
- The Acquisition and Retention of Knowledge (2000),
- Theory and Problems of Adolescent Development (2002), and
- Death and the Human Condition (2002),
  - In Death and the Human Condition he wrote about the psychology of death and impressed his own personal psychological, theological and philosophical thoughts on the nature and implications of the afterlife, conceptualizing death from the perspective of both Christian believers and non-believers, expressing his view that "the relevance and value of faith should certainly not be derogated or treated pejoratively, as atheists, agnostics, and rationalists tend to do."

== Influences ==
Ausubel was influenced by the teachings of Jean Piaget. Similar to Piaget's ideas of conceptual schemes, Ausubel related this to his explanation of how people acquire knowledge. "David Ausubel theorized that people acquire knowledge primarily by being exposed directly to it rather than through discovery" (Woolfolk et al., 2010, p. 288) In other words, Ausubel believed that an understanding of concepts, principles, and ideas is achieved through deductive reasoning.

Similarly, he believed in the idea of meaningful learning as opposed to rote memorization. In the preface to his book Educational Psychology: A Cognitive View, he says that "If [he] had to reduce all of educational psychology to just one principle, [he] would say this: The most important single factor influencing learning is what the learner already knows. Ascertain this and teach him accordingly" (Ausubel, 1968, p. vi) Through his belief of meaningful learning, Ausubel developed his theory of advance organizers. However, Ausubel was a critic of discovery-based teaching techniques, stating:

Actual examination of the research literature allegedly supportive of learning by discovery reveals that valid evidence of this nature is virtually nonexistent. It appears that the various enthusiasts of the discovery method have been supporting each other research-wise by taking in each other's laundry, so to speak, that is, by citing each other's opinions and assertions as evidence and by generalizing wildly from equivocal and even negative findings.

== Advance organizers ==
An advance organizer is information presented by an instructor that helps the student organize new incoming information. This is achieved by directing attention to what is important in the coming material, highlighting relationships, and providing a reminder about relevant prior knowledge.

Advance organizers make it easier to learn new material of a complex or otherwise difficult nature, provided the following two conditions are met:

1. The student must process and understand the information presented in the organizer—this increases the effectiveness of the organizer itself.
2. The organizer must indicate the relations among the basic concepts and terms that will be used.

=== Types ===
Ausubel distinguishes between two kinds of advance organizer: comparative and expository.

1. Comparative Organizers The main goal of comparative organizers is to activate existing schemas. Similarly, they act as reminders to bring into the working memory of what one may not realize is relevant. By acting as reminders, the organizer points out explicitly "whether already established anchoring ideas are nonspecifically or specifically relevant to the learning material" (Ausubel & Robinson, 1969, p. 146). Similarly, a comparative organizer is used both to integrate as well as discriminate. It "integrate[s] new ideas with basically similar concepts in cognitive structure, as well as increase[s] discriminability between new and existing ideas which are essentially different but confusably similar" (Ausubel, 1968, p. 149).

An example of a comparative organizer would be one used for a history lesson on revolutions. This organizer "might be a statement that contrasts military uprisings with the physical and social changes involved in the Industrial Revolution" (Woolfolk et al., 2010, p. 289). Furthermore, one could also compare common aspects of other revolutions from different nations.

2. Expository Organizers "In contrast, expository organizers provide new knowledge that students will need to understand the upcoming information" (Woolfolk et al., 2010, p. 289). Expository organizers are often used when the new learning material is unfamiliar to the learner. They often relate what the learner already knows with the new and unfamiliar material—this in turn is aimed to make the unfamiliar material more plausible to the learner.

An example which Ausubel and Floyd G. Robinson provide in their book School Learning: An Introduction To Educational Psychology is the concept of the Darwinian theory of evolution. To make the Darwinian theory of evolution more plausible, an expository organizer would have a combination of relatedness to general relevant knowledge that is already present, as well as relevance for the more detailed Darwinian theory.

Essentially, expository organizers furnish an anchor in terms that are already familiar to the learner.

Another example would be the concept of a right angle in a mathematics class. A teacher could ask students to point out examples of right angles that they can find in the classroom. By asking students to do this, it helps relates the students present knowledge of familiar classroom objects with the unfamiliar concept of a 90 degree right angle.

=== Criticism ===
"The most persuasively voiced criticism of advance organizers is that their definition and construction are vague and, therefore, that different researchers have varying concepts of what an organizer is and can only rely on intuition in constructing one-- since nowhere, claim the critics, is it specified what their criteria are and how they can be constructed" (Ausubel, 1978, p. 251).

In a response to critics, Ausubel defends advance organizers by stating that there is no one specific example in constructing advance organizers as they "always depends on the nature of the learning material, the age of the learner, and his degree of prior familiarity with the learning passage" (Ausubel, 1978, p. 251).

Another criticism of Ausubel's advance organizers is that the critics often compare the idea of advance organizers with overviews. However, Ausubel has addressed that issue in saying that advance organizers differ from overviews "in being relatable to presumed ideational content in the learner's current cognitive structure" (Ausubel, 1978, p. 252).

Thirdly, critics also address the notion of advance organizers on whether they are intended to favor high ability or low ability students. However, Ausubel notes that "advance organizers are designed to favour meaningful learning.." (Ausubel, 1978, p. 255). Therefore, to question whether advance organizers are better suited for high or low ability students is unrelated as Ausubel argues that advance organizers can be catered to any student to aid them in bridging a gap between what they already know and what they are about to learn.
