= Canadian Council for Research in Education =

Research arm of the Canadian Education Association

The Canadian Council for Research in Education (CCRE) was the research arm of the Canadian Education Association (CEA). It was founded in 1964.

== History ==
In the 1930s, CEA joined with the Canadian Teachers' Association (CTA) to create the first version of the Canadian Council for Research in Education (CCRE). When that organization was disbanded in 1945, the CEA retained a small group called the CEA Research Council. CCRE was then founded in 1963 in Ottawa, and the first director was Floyd G. Robinson. In 1967 they were a key developer of the Canadian Educational Researchers' Association (CERA). In 1972 they were a key developer of the Canadian Society for the Study of Education (CSSE).
