= Joe Hawke =

New Zealand politician (1940–2022)

Joe Hawke MNZM
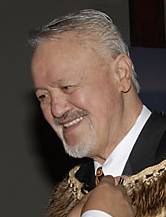
- Hawke in 2008

Member of the New Zealand Parliament for Labour Party List
- In office 12 October 1996 – 27 July 2002

Personal details
- Born: Joseph Parata Hohepa Hawke; 1940 Auckland, New Zealand
- Died: 22 May 2022 (aged 82) Takaparawhau, New Zealand
- Party: Labour

Joseph Parata Hohepa Hawke MNZM (1940 – 22 May 2022) was a New Zealand politician and Māori land rights activist.

He was renowned for his leadership of the 1977–1978 Bastion Point occupation. He also supported respected leader and close friend Dame Whina Cooper on the 1975 Māori Land March. In 1977, Hawke became the very first claimant to be heard by the Waitangi tribunal. His claim, Wai 1, concerned fishing rights and regulations on the Waitematā.

Joe was a member of Parliament for the Labour Party from 1996 to 2002.

== Biography ==
=== Early life and career ===
Hawke was born in 1940 and raised in Ōrākei, living initially in a simple corrugated iron hut. His father was a waterfront worker and his family experienced the 1951 waterfront dispute firsthand. Local housing authorities encouraged the families in his community to exchange the land they lived on for more modern houses elsewhere with electricity. However, Hawke's grandmother stressed the importance of land. To prove her point she sat him down on one occasion and put a lump of soil in one hand and six pennies in his other asking him think to about which of the two would last longer.

Inspired by his grandmother's point he formed the Ōrākei Māori Action Committee in 1976, to take action to halt a land subdivision on the Auckland waterfront. The Ngāti Whātua iwi claimed the land had been taken unjustly from them by the crown and the subdivision plan (for a private housing development) would have left Ngāti Whātua with less than a hectare of remaining land. Hawke led the occupation of Takaparawhau / Bastion Point in 1977, defying then prime minister Robert Muldoon to protest the development. The Muldoon government offered in February 1978 to return some land and houses to the iwi provided they pay $200,000 in development costs. They refused the offer. During the occupation there was fire in a tent on 26 September 1977 which caused the death of Hawke's niece Joanne. He and the protesters stayed on the land for a total of 506 days before the police and army evicted and arrested them on 25 May 1978.

Seven years later, after a law change extended the Waitangi Tribunal's jurisdiction back to 1840, Ngāti Whātua's claim in Ōrākei was the first historical claim to be heard. A 1987 report by the tribunal recommended the land be returned to Ngāti Whātua. In 1988 the government agreed.

Before entering Parliament, he worked as a consultant and a company director. He was involved with a number of Māori organisations and the Mai FM radio station. He was a lay preacher for the Open Brethren.

=== Member of Parliament ===
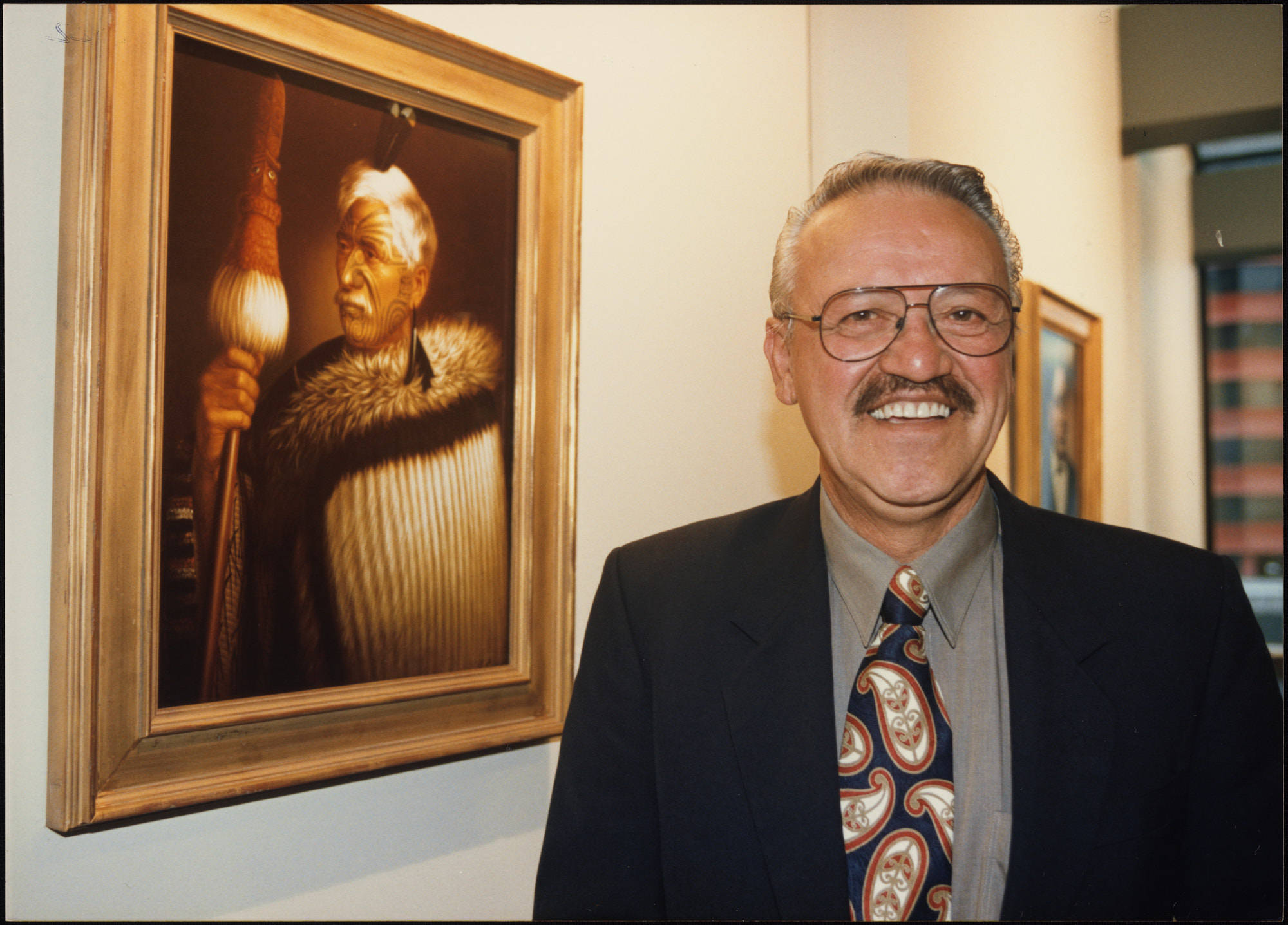
Hawke at the opening of the Auckland Central Library heritage floor, 1997

New Zealand Parliament
Years	Term	Electorate	List	Party
1996–1999	45th	List	15	Labour
1999–2002	46th	List	32	Labour

He was first elected to Parliament in the 1996 election as a list MP, having unsuccessfully contested the Te Tai Tokerau seat against incumbent Tau Henare of New Zealand First. In the 1999 election, he remained a list MP, opting not to stand in an electorate.

In 1997 Hawke collapsed from an angina attack while attending the tangi (funeral) of Matiu Rata. After corrective surgery he gave up eating mutton birds and pork bones and promoted the importance of healthy eating. He also pushed for smoke-free marae (having previously given up smoking himself several years earlier), and called for a nationwide hepatitis B screening programme as the disease particularly affected Māori and Pacific Island people.

Hawke announced he would retire as an MP at the 2002 election, stating he would return to his previous involvement in various iwi businesses as well as tourism and development ventures.

=== Post-political career ===
In the 2008 Queen's Birthday Honours, Hawke was appointed a Member of the New Zealand Order of Merit, for services to Māori and the community.

In December 2021, Hawke was bestowed with an honorary Doctor of Law (LLD) degree from Auckland University - Waipapa Taumata Rau.

He died on 22 May 2022, aged 82 and was buried at Takaparawhau, the land he fought to return to his iwi.
