= Floyd G. Robinson =

Canadian psychologist (1931–2023)

Floyd Grant Robinson (2 January 1931 – 18 December 2023) was a Canadian teacher, education theorist and curriculum developer. He wrote many works on the topics of stimulating complex thinking and the importance of education across the entire lifespan. Robinson is most notable for his work done while at the Ontario Institute for Studies in Education (OISE) between 1965 and 1991.

During his time at OISE the major goal of Robinson's applied research was to foster problem solving, critical thinking and other forms of complex thinking in elementary and secondary school learners and post-graduate students. In retirement his interest broadened to facilitate inter-agency collaboration in support of comprehensively defined human development and empowerment.

== Education and personal life ==
Robinson was born and raised in Humberstone, Ontario, in a family of four brothers, all of whom became secondary school and/or university teachers. He obtained four university degrees, the most influential in his professional work being a master's degree in pure mathematics from the University of Toronto and a Ph.D. in educational psychology from the University of Alberta. In 1955 he married Mary Lucy Ruggiero, a RN (Registered Nurse) from Port Colborne, and together they had four children and five grandchildren. From 1972 onward, the Robinsons resided at their rural property in mid-northern Ontario.

Robinson died on 18 December 2023, at the age of 92.

== Career ==
Robinson began his professional career as a secondary school teacher of mathematics and physics. After completing his doctorate in 1959 he became, in succession, the Research Director of The Canadian Teachers' Federation and the first Director of The Canadian Council for Research in Education, – the latter founded to promote the establishment of a research presence and influence in educational practice.

When the Ontario Institute for Studies in Education was created in 1965, Robinson became the founding Head and professor of the Department of Applied Psychology. In 1968 Robinson elected to work in OISE's Field Centres and until retirement was successively Head and Field Professor in the Niagara, Northeastern Ontario, and Mid-northern Ontario Centres. He believed that the best chance of improving education occurred when field-based education professors determined by sustained, on-site contact, the learning objectives of educational practitioners (teachers, principals, consultants, superintendents) and the practical schema they were employing to achieve them. This understanding then enabled the academic to help practitioners use research results and theoretical concepts to both upgrade and better achieve their goals. It was part of Robinson's professional code that he always volunteered to risk being the first to teach any proposed new intervention.

Over his more than two decades in the field, Robinson formalised his approach in a comprehensive system that is recognized for "the powerful procedures it contains for developing and analyzing curriculum... rooted in a clear conception of inquiry and problem solving". Several hundred of Robinson's publications have been disseminated.

After his formal retirement in 1991, Robinson was a volunteer learning consultant with professionals in health, education, adult literacy and a variety of other social service agencies that saw the need to introduce formal curriculum design concepts into their increasingly pro-active (educational) professional work. Working from the principle that the collective mission of these agencies should be to foster the optimal development of community members, an ongoing thrust was to develop the robust conception of a fully functioning human being that was needed to cumulate the impacts of their individual programs.

=== Research in education ===
In 1963 Robinson became the founding Director of the Canadian Council for Research in Education (CCRE), an organisation whose function was to initiate, develop and encourage research in education in Canada.

Robinson believed that applied research could address the current problems in education, his chief criticisms being that school curricula were out-of-date and subject to convulsive change, the teaching process was flawed and children were not achieving their full potential as learners. He proposed a schema for improvement that combined basic and applied research, the goals of education and the process of implementation and evaluation.

Through speaking engagements and CCRE publications he campaigned for the establishment of provincial educational research bodies to undertake this needed development. This coincided with a growing movement spearheaded by Education Minister Bill Davis to establish an independent institute of educational research combined with a graduate school of education in Ontario.

It was Robinson's major point in a provocative keynote speech delivered to the annual meeting of the Education Week Committee in April 1965, which caused sharp disagreement amongst the assembled delegates. The following day, a government source announced Davis's plans to develop an institute for educational research and study.

At the end of that year Robinson was invited to join the new institute, named The Ontario Institute for Studies in Education. Education historian W.G. Fleming later wrote of CCRE: "The departure of Robinson from the directorship at the beginning of 1966 constituted an irreparable loss".

Despite his relative youth (35) and lack of university academic experience, Robinson was appointed a full professor in the School of Graduate Studies at the University of Toronto upon joining OISE. The professorship was awarded on the grounds of his previous contribution to the profession of educational research.

=== School Learning ===
When Robinson was recruited to OISE in 1965, he was offered a department headship. The department best suited to his qualifications (a Ph.D. in Educational Psychology) was the one dealing with school learning, which he named the Department of Applied Psychology.

For the next two years, he spent his energies recruiting staff and determining the structure of the intended learning program. At the end of that time, the department had grown in size from two to 24 staff, and was functional and ready to admit students. It had also recruited some outstanding staff, most notably the American psychologist and psychiatrist David Ausubel, who put OISE on the educational map the very day it started to enrol students by publishing, in a prestigious research journal, a critique of Piaget's theory of stage development.

In 1967 Robinson resigned from OISE to pursue an ambition to write something scholarly. An opportunity to do this came almost immediately when Ausubel asked him to co-author a revision of his already-published book on educational psychology, phrasing it in a language more congenial to classroom teachers. The resultant textbook, School Learning: An Introduction to Educational Psychology was published in 1969. It interpreted Ausubel's theory of 'meaningful verbal learning' in the context of education. Subsequent editions were published in Britain (1971), Australia (1972), Romania (1973) and Japan (1984).

=== Inquiry training ===
In 1968, the textbook with Ausubel completed, Robinson was recruited to OISE once again, this time as a Field Professor at the institute's newly created Niagara field centre. His condition was that he would be allowed to pursue projects that would be of immediate practical educational benefit and would be free from the normal academic teaching and administrative duties.

Robinson rejoined OISE at a time when there was a growing public and political clamour to dissolve the institute. Its critics contended that OISE was a useless or at best ineffective construction of the Conservative government that needed to be eliminated, reduced, or amalgamated with the Faculty of Education.

His first major opportunity to demonstrate OISE impact arose with the publication of Living and Learning, the result of a Royal Commission on elementary education in Ontario, one of whose two major recommendations called for students to learn from their own inquiries instead of just being passive absorbers of teacher-disseminated knowledge. Teachers were struggling with this new emphasis and when the director of education for a municipal school system approached OISE Niagara Centre for help, Robinson led the design of an innovative inquiry training program and demonstrated it in classrooms.

Building upon Ausubel's concept of advance organizers, Robinson created an advance organizer for inquiry (later named the General Problem Solving Model) based roughly on John Dewey's model of problem solving. The program identified six models for inquiry: logical/quantitative analysis, comparison, cause-effect reasoning, correlational study, decision making, and case study—a sequence defined by increasing uncertainty about the truth of conclusions. Robinson arrived at the models by first studying his own approach to problem solving and then testing the validity of these models with his own four children conveniently spaced in their ages.

In the first pilot tests, a group of learning-disadvantaged grade seven students, reading at a grade three level, after only 30 hours of instruction matched the performance of regular grade seven students on a comprehensive problem solving test. In a second pilot test, the performance of inquiry-trained grade six students equalled that of grade 12 students of comparable IQ, an apparent gain of six developmental years from 30 hours of instruction. An account of the program rationale, models and early results were published in Inquiry Training: Fusing Theory And Practice.

Two related public statements in support of OISE appeared during and shortly after this time. In the first, the director of education involved in the project wrote to a national newspaper refuting its criticisms of the Institute and stating that the interaction between his teaching staff and OISE Niagara Centre had quelled any doubts about its effectiveness in solving important educational problems. In the second, the politician and educator Walter Pitman, who had previously been a vocal critic of OISE, made first reference to the positive results of the Inquiry Program in his column in a major daily newspaper, stating that "a couple of thousand children are already benefitting" from the program, and declaring that the OISE field centres "remain the most effective symbol of an institution which is slowly but surely paying off in a better educational system for Ontario".

In 1972 Robinson relocated to OISE's newly created Northeastern Centre and continued to successfully demonstrate the Inquiry Program to teachers in that area. One of the participants was Mike Harris, later Premier of Ontario.

For more than a decade the program continued to receive commendations from educators including curriculum theorist Dr. John Miller, who wrote, "Floyd Robinson and his associates at the Ontario Institute for Studies in Education have originated a major project to develop thinking skills in elementary school. In particular Robinson has developed programs that facilitate inquiry and problem solving skills." Miller's book went on to describe a worked example of one of the inquiry models.

Despite their proven effectiveness, the Inquiry Program models were never widely adopted by classroom teachers. This caused a major shift in Robinson's thinking about the most productive relationship between educational theory and research on the one hand and educational practice on the other. For the remainder of his career he eschewed the traditional theory-to-practice model in favour of a much slower, but surer, process of making improvements in educational practice. This process comprised: i) a practitioner acknowledging a perceived problem in practice; ii) analyzing this problem as an ineffectively performing process; iii) explaining the most effective practice insights in general conceptual terms; iv) modifying the process on the basis of this analysis and broader theoretical ideas; v) personally pilot testing the augmented process in the practitioner's situation and vi) demonstrating the effectiveness of the proposed augmentation before advocating the practitioner risk employing it himself.

=== Curriculum development ===
Robinson's focus on curriculum development began in the early 1970s after he had relocated to OISE Northeastern Centre. At this time, the Ontario government undertook a curriculum revision reflecting a movement from provincial to local curriculum control. In this revision, school boards and derivatively, elementary classroom teachers, were to develop their own instructional units/courses within broad Ministry guidelines.

By undertaking a survey of Ontario faculties of education, Robinson discovered that in their training teachers were taught how to devise individual lessons but had little opportunity to design instructional units. Consequently, when local boards of education set up teacher-staffed curriculum committees they could do little more than assemble bits from the already-established curricula. There seemed to be a clear need for a strategy for designing curriculum units/courses. A 'unit' was understood to be a period of instruction of about a month of school time or a chapter of a textbook. A 'course' was understood to be the set of units whose content was covered by a course textbook.

==== Image of the educated person ====
Robinson had to come up with such a strategy when Northeastern Centre was approached by a board committee for help in developing an instructional unit on 'energy'. He thought a sensible starting point in designing a curriculum was to clarify what a learner should know, feel or be able to do after completing the unit. He envisaged a human 'quality by context' framework as a schema for generating unit or course objectives. The overall mental picture conveyed by the content of this framework was named the "image of the educated person" and the term started to appear in teacher in-service presentations of the time.

The first named generic image emerged when Robinson was subsequently tasked with performing an analysis of the educational aims and objectives in Ontario, where they were going and if he could identify any direction in them. Starting from the Grey Book, he did a qualities-by-context analysis (i.e., what knowledge, skills and attitudes in what contexts each of these curriculum documents was trying to promote) and how that was changing over the years. He concluded that the emerging goal of education was to create a "self-directed problem solver", a concept that was subsequently incorporated in a super-ordinate Ministry of Education guideline.

Constructing the image of the educated person subsequently became the first task in what was emerging for Robinson as a comprehensive method for developing a curriculum.

The self-directed problem solver image was progressively broadened over the next quarter century, first becoming the "self-directed learner", and in a further expansion, someone who continues to develop human qualities by beneficially engaging life tasks in increasingly more sophisticated ways. Most recently, the term "complete human being" was used to describe the person who continues to develop designated human dimensions and apply their most currently developed form to the activities of daily living, working from the deepest dimensions outward.

==== ICPOGMU ====
The need to identify a set of curriculum development tasks and strategies for dealing with them intensified in the mid-1970s when Northeastern Centre launched its first two courses in a curriculum consultancy program. This area of concentration was chosen because Robinson's interaction with school personnel was centered on the curriculum they offered to classroom teachers and their students.

These initial classes were taught by Robinson and centre head John Clipsham. Sessions focused on curriculum tasks teachers had to deal with in their classrooms: setting learning objectives, defining growth in relation to these objectives, teaching that stimulated this growth and (marginally) how to develop longer learning episodes such as units and courses. The content of these courses built on previous successful curriculum interventions, particularly the Inquiry Program.

As a result of these courses, by the late 1970s a set of tentative ideas about the dominant tasks of curriculum design and how to address them had emerged under the acronym ICPOGMU: Images, Category System, Priorities, Organizers, Growth Schemes, Methodology, and Unit Design. This became the basis for a series of OISE courses in curriculum design that subsequently took place in Northeastern Ontario (North Bay, Parry Sound, Muskoka), the Niagara region (Brock University) and Peterborough.

Almost immediately Robinson and his colleagues and M.Ed. students began to use ICPOGMU to develop comprehensive curricula wherever the opportunity presented itself. It was incorporated in a series of intermediate science textbooks, a primary/junior environmental studies program, in-service courses for junior grade teachers, secondary school geography, history, science and language arts programs, and principal training courses, to name but a few.

As this experience accumulated, the idea was born that an update of ICPOGMU should be written that better described emerging/upgraded strategies. Robinson was the principal author of this account, entitled Curriculum Development For Effective Instruction. The strategies were praised by education experts who stated, "Robinson's model includes one of the most sophisticated curriculum systems that we know of. The uniqueness of this model is the powerful procedures it contains for developing and analyzing curriculum"; and noted that the book "should help a great deal in making the Robinson model more accessible and in assisting teachers and curriculum workers in the use of this model that is so conceptually sound".

== Volunteer work ==
During his latter days at OISE Robinson began to look at the curriculum work of community educative agencies outside schools and realized that ICPOGMU concepts and strategies could be very beneficial to them. Following his retirement in 1991, he acted as a volunteer consultant to professionals working in adult literacy, community health and early years programs, helping them apply the curriculum development system to their work.

During the early 2000s the system was incorporated into a larger scheme for fostering human development and empowerment, described in the 2010 book of that name and revised and updated in 2016. For the remainder of his life he continued to look for opportunities to offer input on educational or social practices for which the system could suggest dramatic improvement.

== Honours ==
In 1983 Robinson received The Colonel Watson Award from the Ontario Association for Curriculum Development which stated, "Dr Robinson merits not only recognition, but gratitude, for the extensive influence he has had on other academics, curriculum innovators, Ministry of Education personnel, classroom teachers, and most significantly, the students in the classroom".

== Writings (selected) ==
- School Learning: an introduction to educational psychology (1969) ISBN 978-0-03-076705-0
- Volunteer Helpers in Elementary Schools (1971) ISBN 978-0-7744-0055-8
- Inquiry Training: Fusing Theory and Practice (1972) ISBN 978-0-7744-0069-5
- Rate and Ratio: Classroom-Tested Curriculum Materials for Teachers at the Elementary Level (1981) ISBN 978-0-7744-5033-1
- Curriculum Development for Effective Instruction (1985) ISBN 978-0-7744-0279-8
- Fostering Human Development and Empowerment (2010) ISBN 978-0-9866169-0-7
- Achieving Human Potential: A Plan For Growth (2016) ISBN 978-0-9866169-1-4
