= Bastion Point =

Area of coastal land in Auckland, New Zealand

Bastion Point Takaparawhau (Māori)
- Headland
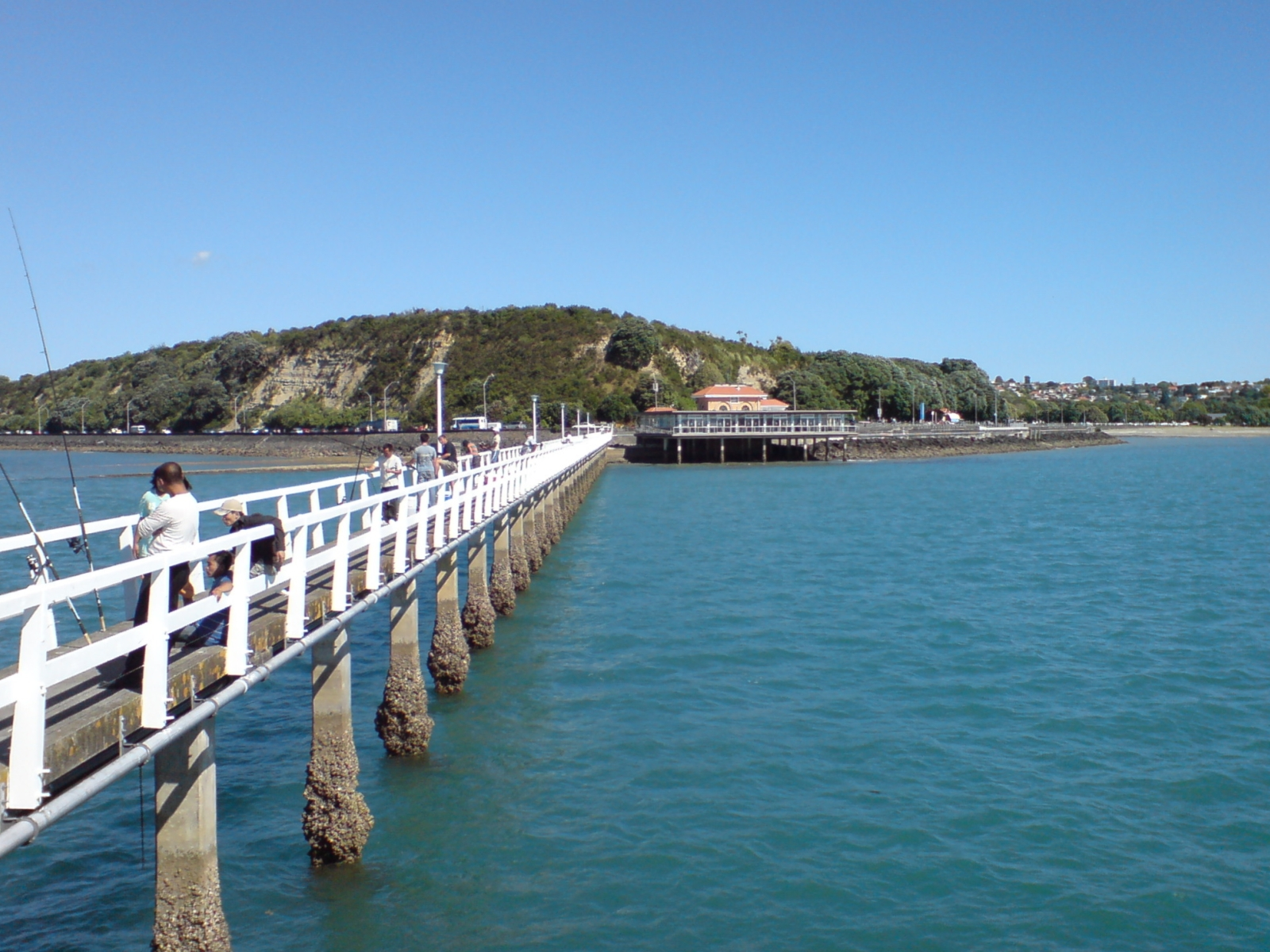
- Takaparawhau / Bastion Point seen from the fishing pier jutting out into the Waitematā Harbour.

- Location within Auckland
- Coordinates: 36°50′39″S 174°49′27″E
- Location: Auckland, New Zealand
- Part of: Ōrākei
- Water bodies: Waitematā Harbour

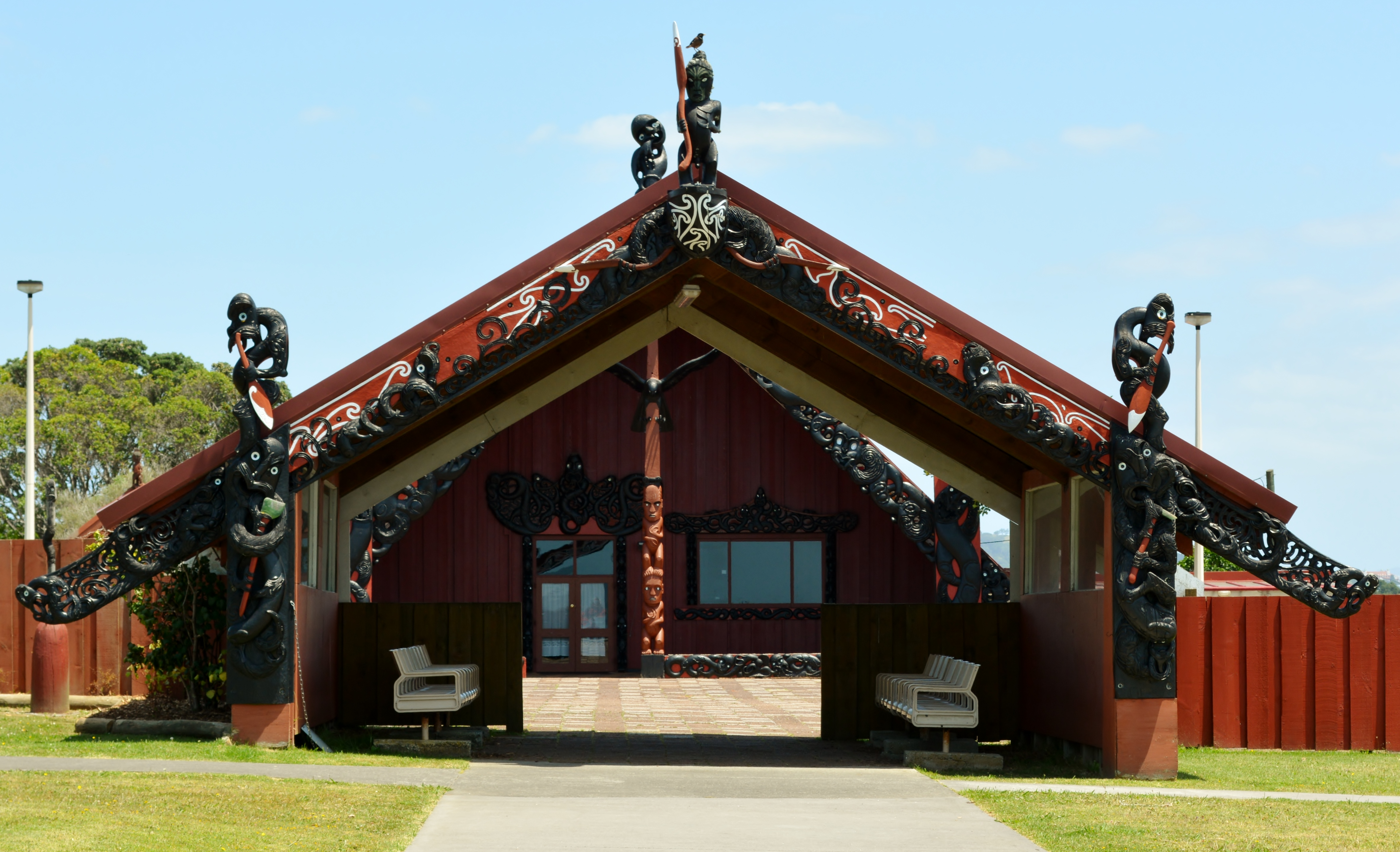
The entrance to Ōrākei Marae, the cultural hub for Ngāti Whātua Ōrākei.

Bastion Point (Takaparawhau) is a coastal piece of land in Ōrākei, Auckland, New Zealand, overlooking the Waitematā Harbour. The area is significant in New Zealand history as the site of protests in the late 1970s by Māori against forced land alienation by the Crown. Takaparawhau is now the site of the private Ōrākei Marae, the public Michael Joseph Savage Memorial, and privately owned reserve land that is accessible to the public.

== Naming ==
Bastion Rock was the site of Kohimarama (Note: According to George Graham the full name is Kohimaramara (to collect the remnants [of the tribe])) Pā which was known as The Bastion. Bastion Point became the common English name for the site encompassing both points. Māori named the western point named Takaparawhau. Felton Mathew named the promontory South Head. The nearby beach, known as Waipārera in Māori, became known as Kohimarama. Ngāti Whātua Ōrākei, call it Takaparawhau, which, along with Ōkahu Bay, form Whenua Rangatira, which is vested in Ngāti Whātua Ōrākei for the common use and benefit of Ngāti Whātua Ōrākei and citizens of Auckland, and is managed by the Ngāti Whātua Ōrākei Reserves Board. The public land containing the Michael Joseph Savage Memorial and Fort Britomart tunnels is not owned by the hapū, who refer to it as Kohimarama, while Auckland Council now call it Takaparawhau.

== History ==
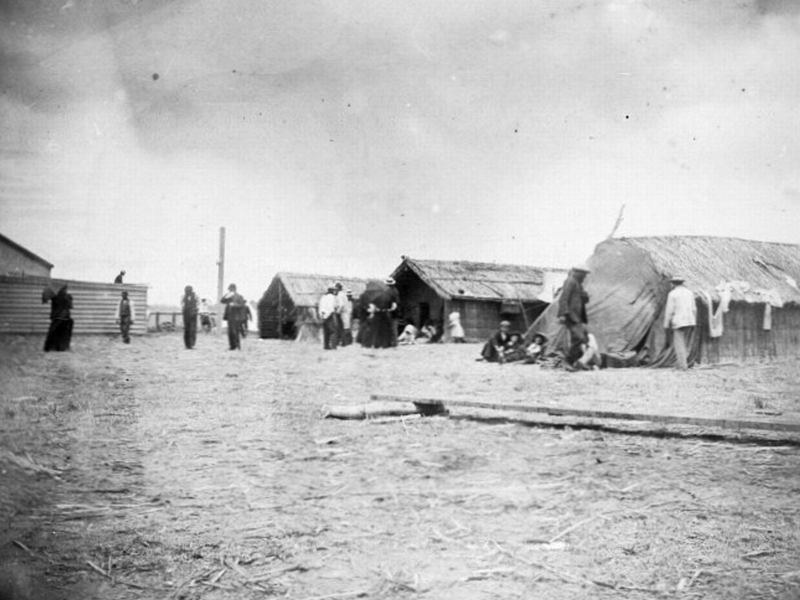
The marae on Takaparawhau in the 1890s.

The land was occupied by Ngāti Whātua Ōrākei, and before the colonisation of New Zealand it was part of important lands for the hapū, overlooking rich fishing and farming areas. The surrounding land was purchased and confiscated by the New Zealand Government for public works and development over a period stretching from the 1840s into the 1950s.

On 20 March 1840, in the Manukau Harbour area where Ngāti Whātua farmed, paramount chief Apihai Te Kawau signed the Treaty of Waitangi. Ngāti Whātua sought British protection from Ngāpuhi as well as a reciprocal relationship with the Crown and the Church. Soon after signing the treaty, Ngāti Whātua Ōrākei, the primary hapū and landowner on the Auckland isthmus, made a strategic gift of 3,500 acres (1,400 hectares) of land on the Waitematā Harbour to William Hobson, the new Governor of New Zealand, for the new capital. By 1859 Ngāti Whātua Ōrākei, who sold a further 13,200 acres (5,300 ha) to the Crown, had lost most of their remaining land through speculators. The 700-acre Orakei Block was all that remained. Within a century this was compulsorily acquired by the Crown (apart from a cemetery).

Apihai Te Kawau spoke publicly against land sales and in order to safeguard a small amount of land in Ōrākei for future generations, and Te Kawau obtained a Crown Grant in 1869. In 1873, the Native Land Court stated that "the land shall be inalienable". A reversal of this government position came with the Validation Of Invalid Land Sales Act 1894. In 1885, the New Zealand Government built a military outpost at Bastion Point, because of its commanding strategic position overlooking the Waitematā Harbour, known as Fort Bastion. The outpost was not built on Takaparawha Point, which had earlier been taken by the Government for the same purpose. In 1886, the Crown used the Public Works Act 1882 (46 Vict No 37) to take ownership of 13 acres (5.3 ha) of Bastion Point for this purpose of defence. From 1913 and 1928, the government bought most of the land that had been previously deemed inalienable. As Ranganui Walker states, this is by no means a simple case of willful dispossession: "In a long running battle to resist the state and save the land, there were eight actions in the Maori Land Court, four in the Supreme Court, two in the Court of Appeal, two in the Compensation Court, six appearances before Commissions or Committees of Inquiry, and fifteen Parliamentary Petitions. In the end the state prevailed".

In 1936, Ōrākei was proposed as a site for state housing by the First Labour Government, and in August a Māori delegation asked Prime Minister Savage that at least the marae on the flat foreshore where he had been ceremonially welcomed after his election should be retained by the tribe. Savage was 'somewhat fogged' by the situation and asked for reports, which were not completed when he sailed to Britain for the Coronation and Imperial Conference in 1937. The Labour state housing team John A. Lee and Frank Langstone decided that the 120 Māori living at Ōrākei were illegal squatters and had to be removed. The incensed Ōrākei Māori met Savage on his return from overseas, and he immediately reversed the decision, avoiding what could have been a political crisis. In November 1936, Lee had assured Walter Nash that the Māori would be removed without much difficulty; but they refused, and were supported by the Clergy Association, the Protestant churches, the Anglican Bishop, the Friends of Orakei and the New Zealand Observer. Robin Hyde wrote No More Dancing at Orakei. Lee obtained most of his land, but Langstone's (and the Cabinet's) decision; seen as obtaining Māori land as a park 'for white children' was reversed. Another motive for their proposal was to weaken Bill Endean's grip on Parnell, the only non-Labour seat in Auckland. Māori from the pā met Savages' body when it arrived back in Auckland in 1940.

In 1941, the Crown no longer needed Bastion Point for defence, it did not return the land to its traditional Māori owners but instead gifted it to the Auckland City Council for a reserve. (This was the last 60 acres (24.3 ha) of uncommitted land at Ōrākei that Ngāti Whātua Ōrākei still hoped to get back.)

During World War II, three searchlights were housed in emplacements built at the foot of Bastion Point, and still exist today. Guns, searchlights, and an anti-submarine boom stretched to Torpedo Bay near North Head, were installed at the front of the Tamaki Yacht Club, and were later incorporated into the yacht club building.

In 1951, Māori living in Ōrākei were evicted and the houses were knocked down. A justification for this eviction was health and sanitation issues, for which the government was ultimately responsible. These issues were created by the city council earlier when a sewer line and road were built along the foreshore which blocked the flow of storm water, creating the quagmire of sanitation problems. At the same time the village at Ōkahu Bay was not connected to the city's fresh water supply.

== Savage Memorial ==
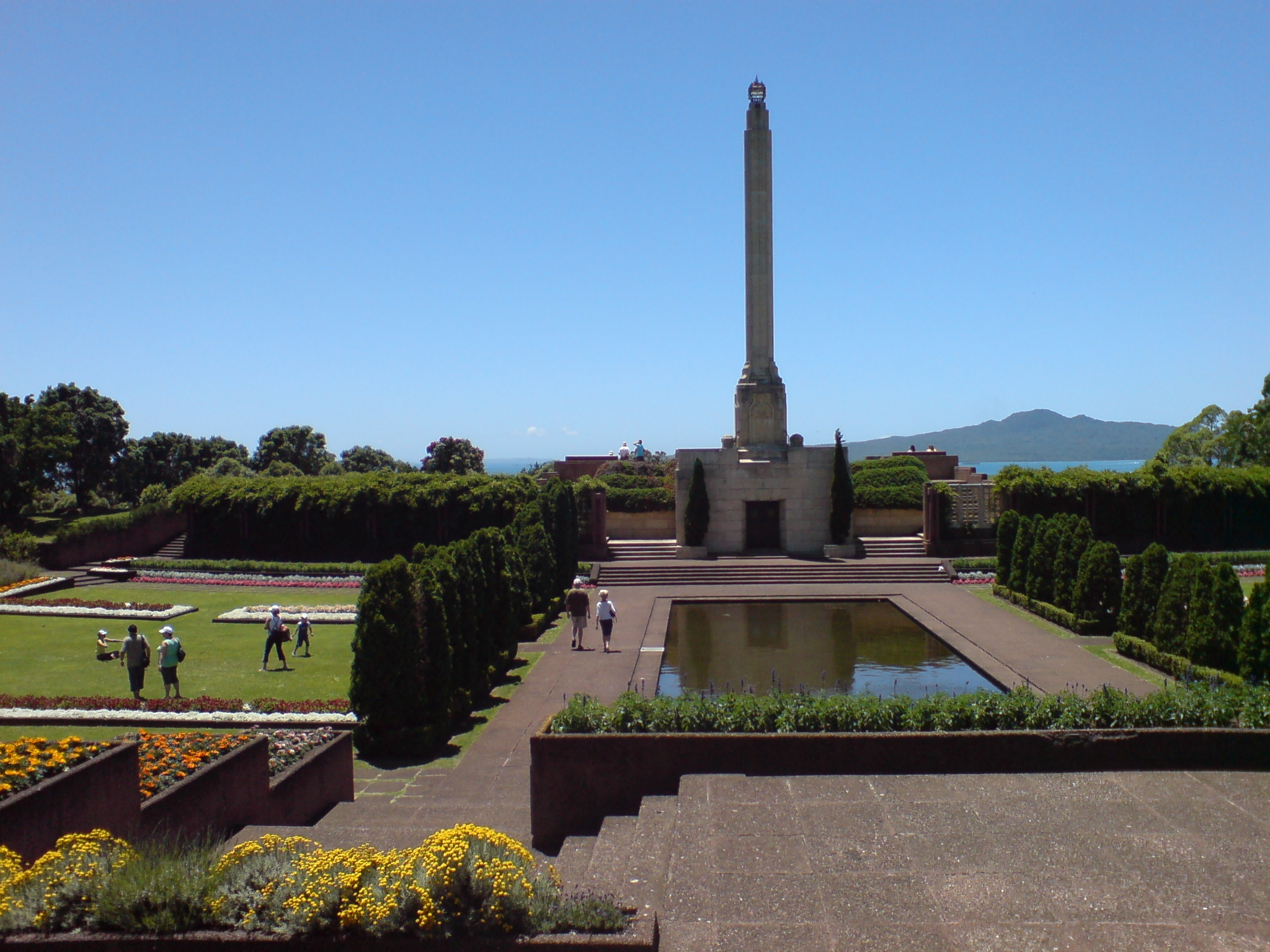
Michael Joseph Savage Memorial and tomb.

The first Labour Prime Minister of New Zealand, Michael Joseph Savage died in office in 1940, and is buried in an Art Deco mausoleum at Bastion Point designed by Tibor Donner and Anthony Bartlett with a sculpture by R. O. Gross, built above the disused Fort Britomart. It has large columns, sunken gardens and a reflecting pool which was built in two years by Fletcher Construction for £34,533, with the cost raised by subscription.

The monument was dedicated before a crowd of ten thousand on 28 March 1943, with Savage's remains reinterred in a deep tunnel below the monument. The tomb is inscribed: Michael Joseph Savage, 1872–1940, He loved his fellow men.

== Occupation and return ==
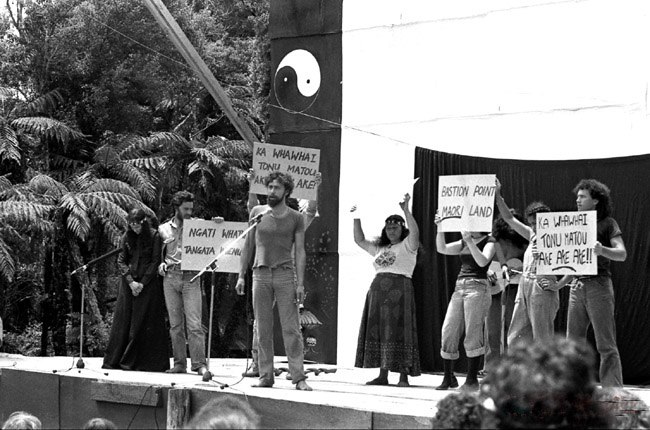
Bastion Point activist campaign at Nambassa alternatives festival 1981.

In 1976, the Crown announced that it planned to develop Bastion Point by selling it to the highest bidder for high-income housing. Joe Hawke, members of his hapū Ngāti Whātua Ōrākei, and other activists, formed the Orakei Māori Action Committee, taking direct action to stop the subdivision. The government claimed that the land had been sold to the Crown, however Hawke claimed that, "This land was not sold – it was confiscated under the Public Works Lands Act".

From 1977 to 1978, the Orakei Māori Action Committee organised and maintained an occupation of the remaining Crown land. The occupation began on 5 January 1977, two days before construction of the housing was to start, to prevent its confiscation by the Muldoon Government. The occupiers constructed a marae and housing, and grew crops. A fire in a tent on 26 September 1977 caused the death of a young girl named Joanna Hawke, the niece of protest leader Joe Hawke.

The occupation lasted for 506 days; it ended on 25 May 1978, when 800 police and personnel of the New Zealand Army forcibly removed the occupiers and destroyed the temporary buildings—including vegetable gardens and the marae. Two hundred and twenty two protesters were arrested. The occupation and the use of force to end it played a part in highlighting injustices against Māori, and the occupation became a major landmark in the history of Māori protest.

In 1988, the New Zealand Labour Government returned Bastion Point and Ōrākei Marae to Ngāti Whātua Ōrākei, with compensation, as part of a Treaty of Waitangi settlement process. The 1991 Ōrākei Act was passed to recognise the rights of Ngāti Whātua Ōrākei under the treaty.

Joe Hawke died on 22 May 2022, aged 82 and was buried at Bastion Point.

== See also ==
- Māori protest movement
- Treaty of Waitangi
- Ngāti Whātua
- Ōrākei
- Coastal fortifications of New Zealand

== Gallery ==
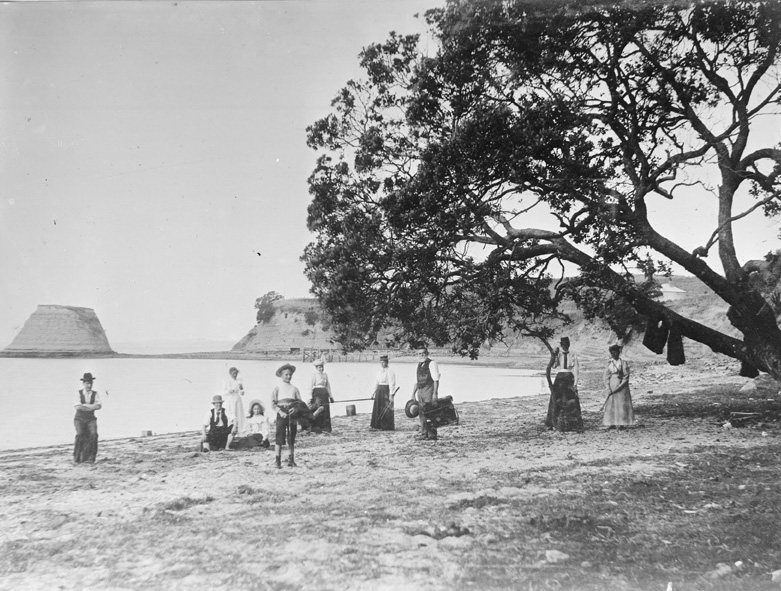
Looking east along Biddicks Bay towards Takaparawha showing Bastion Rock, since demolished, 1901.

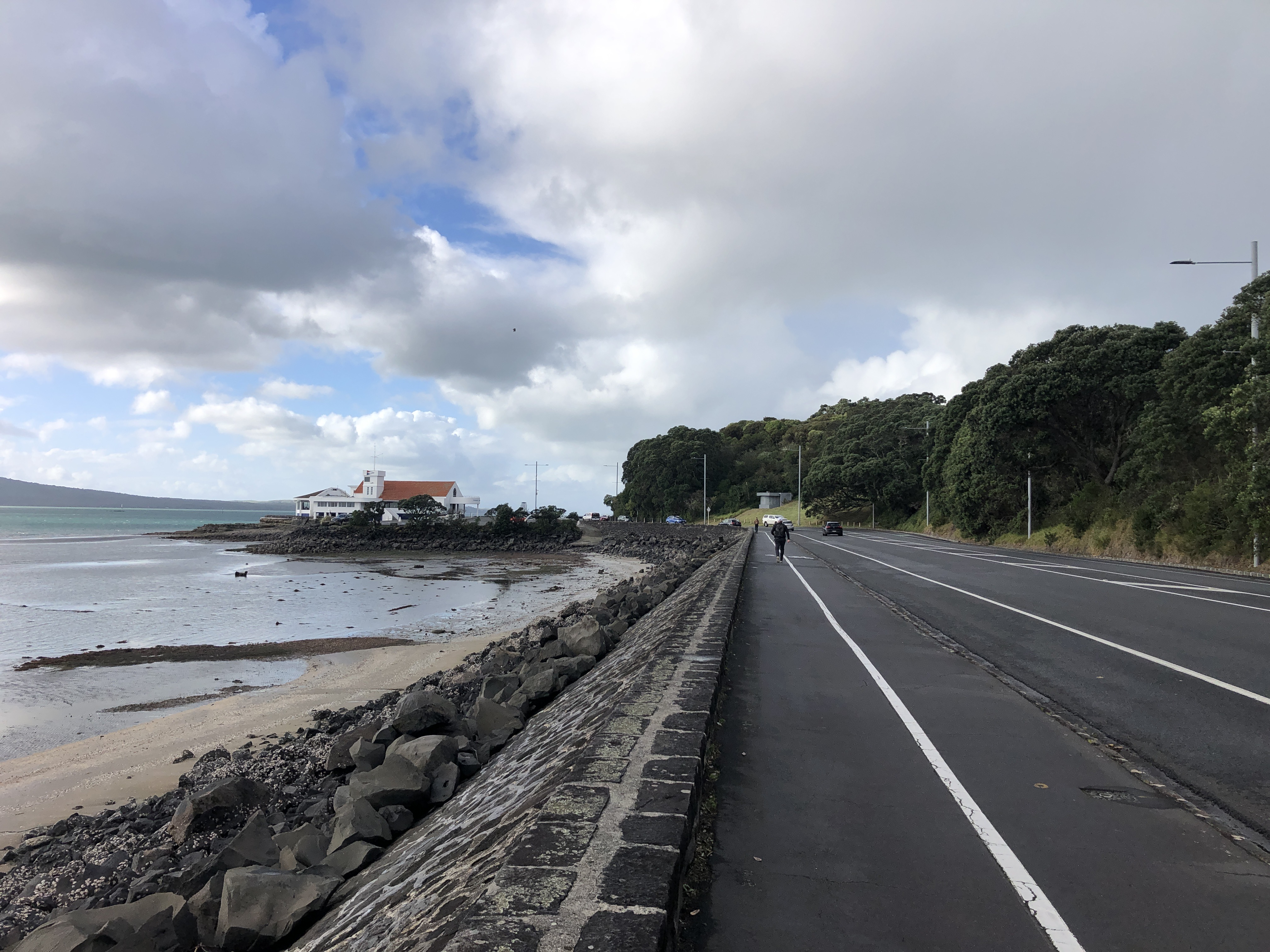
Looking east to Takaparawhau showing Tamaki Yacht Club where Bastion Rock was removed, 2022.

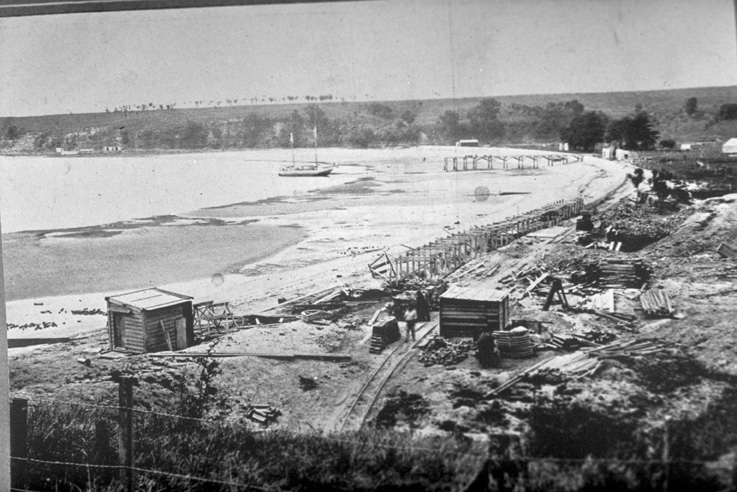
Looking north east along Ōkahu Bay towards Takaparawhau, showing the sewer line in course of construction, 1910.

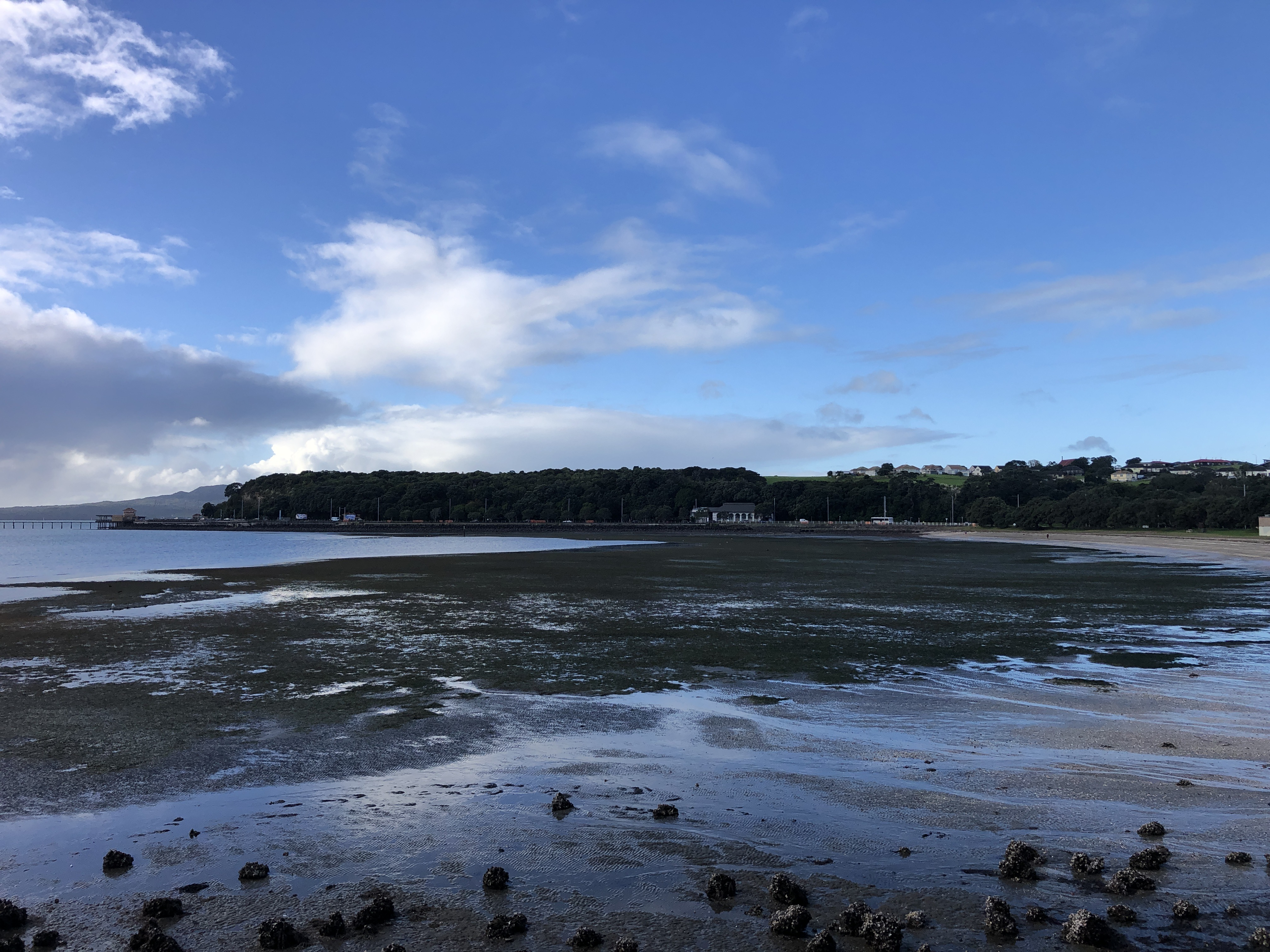
Looking north east along Ōkahu Bay towards Takaparawhau, with Tumutumuwhenua wharenui (meeting house) visible on the ridgeline, 2022.

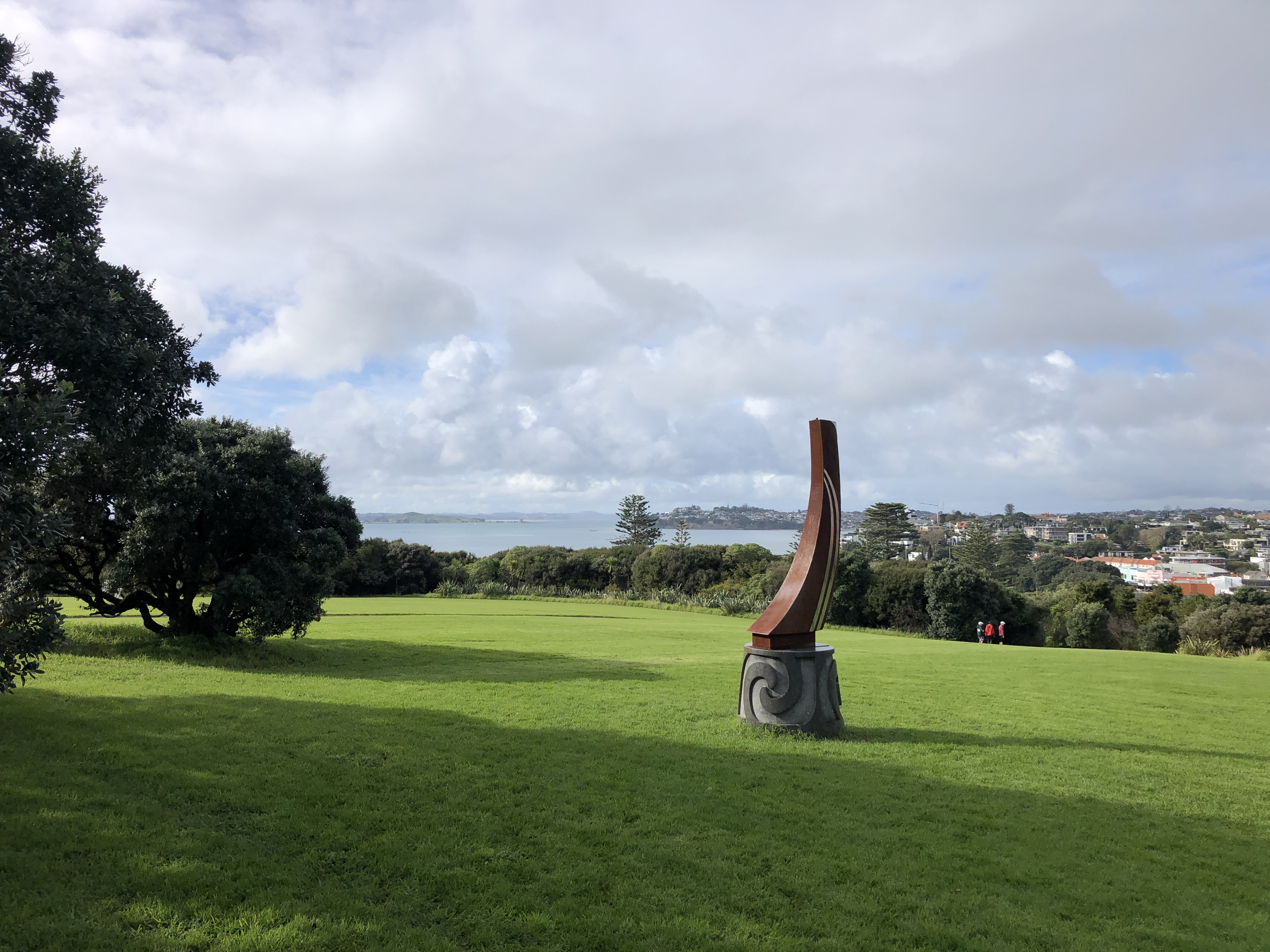
Takaparawha Pou (pole or column) installed at Takaparawhau (Bastion Point) in 2019, designed by Lenard Philips and Te Aroha Witika. The pou has the shape of a taurapa (the stern of a waka) standing on a concrete plinth representing the toka (rock) that acted as a beacon for waka, known as Bastion Rock.

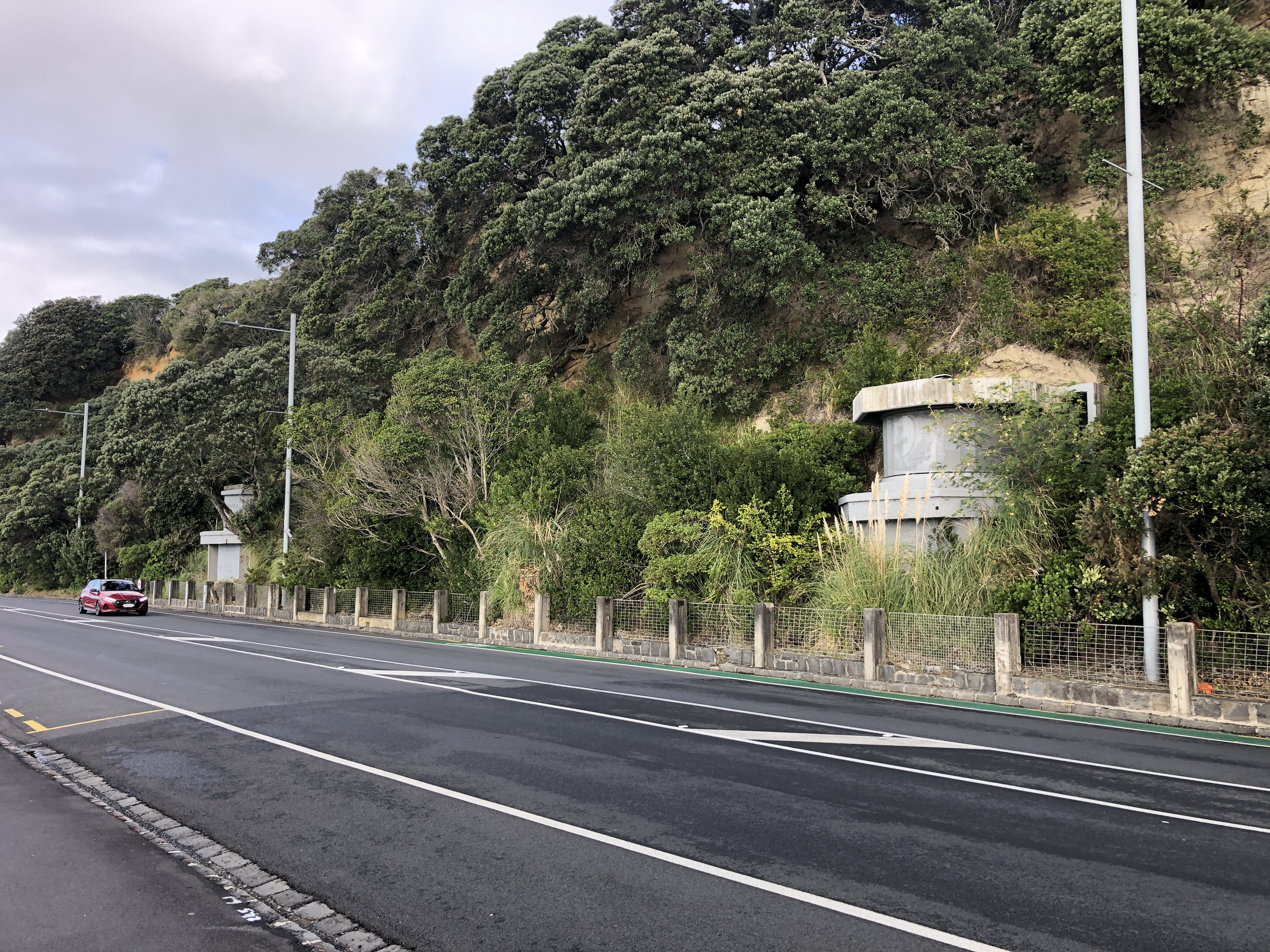
Takaparawhau searchlight emplacements, numbers one and two, completed in 1944.

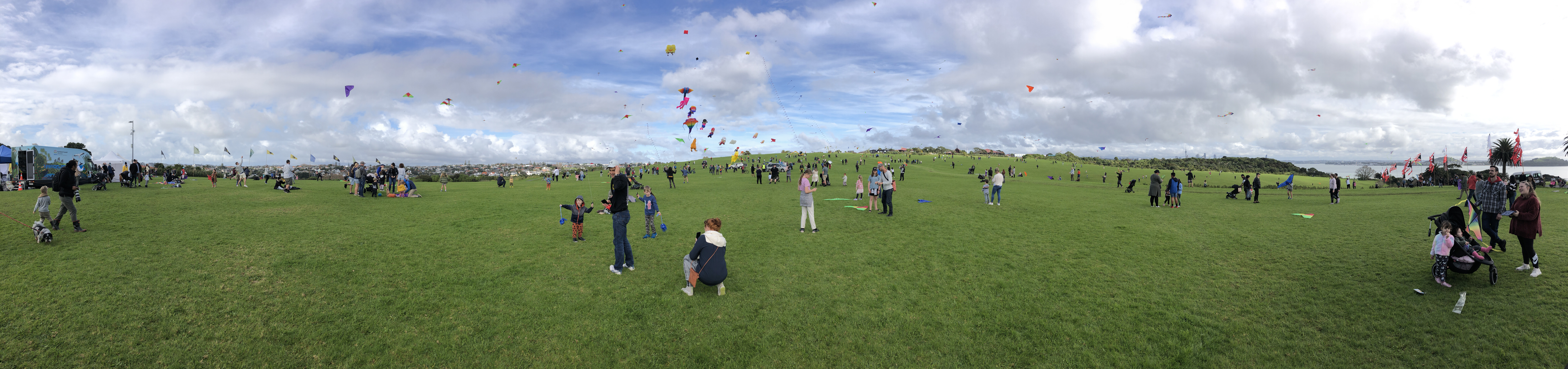
Panorama showing the annual Manu Aute Kite Day, held on Takaparawhau on the first Matariki long weekend, June 2022.

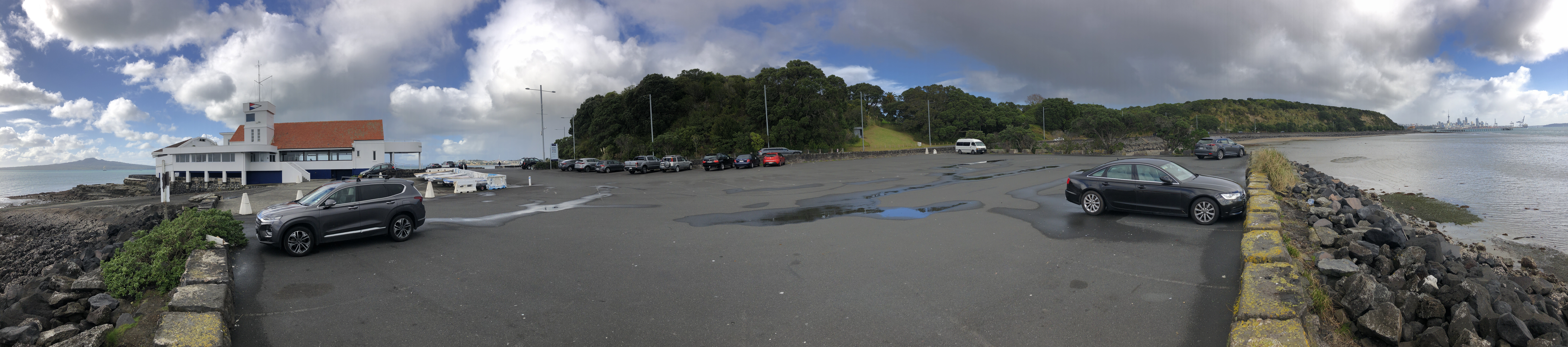
Panorama showing Tamaki Yacht Club, both Takaparawhau points and searchlight emplacement number three, 2022
