= Te Ara ki Uta ki Tai =

Shared path in Auckland, New Zealand

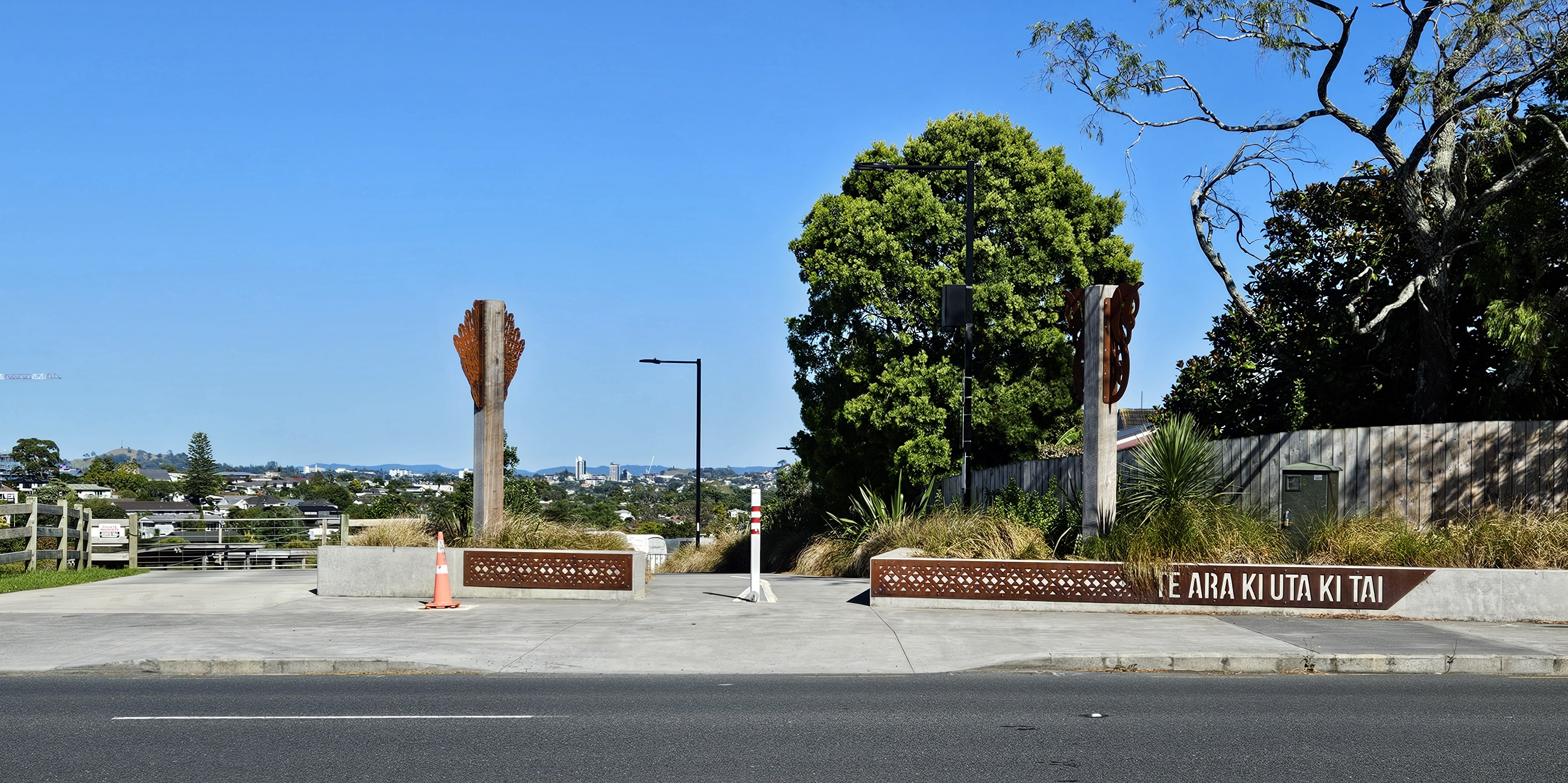
- Kohimarama Road entrance to the northwestern section of Te Ara ki Uta ki Tai
- Length: 7 kilometres (4.3 mi)
- Location: Auckland, New Zealand
- Established: 2016
- Trailheads: Tāmaki Drive (northwest) to; Merton Road, Glen Innes (southeast)
- Use: Cycling, pedestrian
- Difficulty: Easy
- Season: All seasons
- Surface: Asphalt

Trail map
- Map of Te Ara ki Uta ki Tai

Te Ara ki Uta ki Tai (English: The Path to Land and Sea), also known as the Glen Innes to Tamaki Drive shared path, is a shared pathway connecting the suburbs of Ōrākei and Glen Innes in Auckland, New Zealand. It runs through the Pourewa Valley and the Eastern Transport Corridor, and for most of its length is adjacent to the North Island Main Trunk railway line.

== History ==
=== Proposed motorway ===
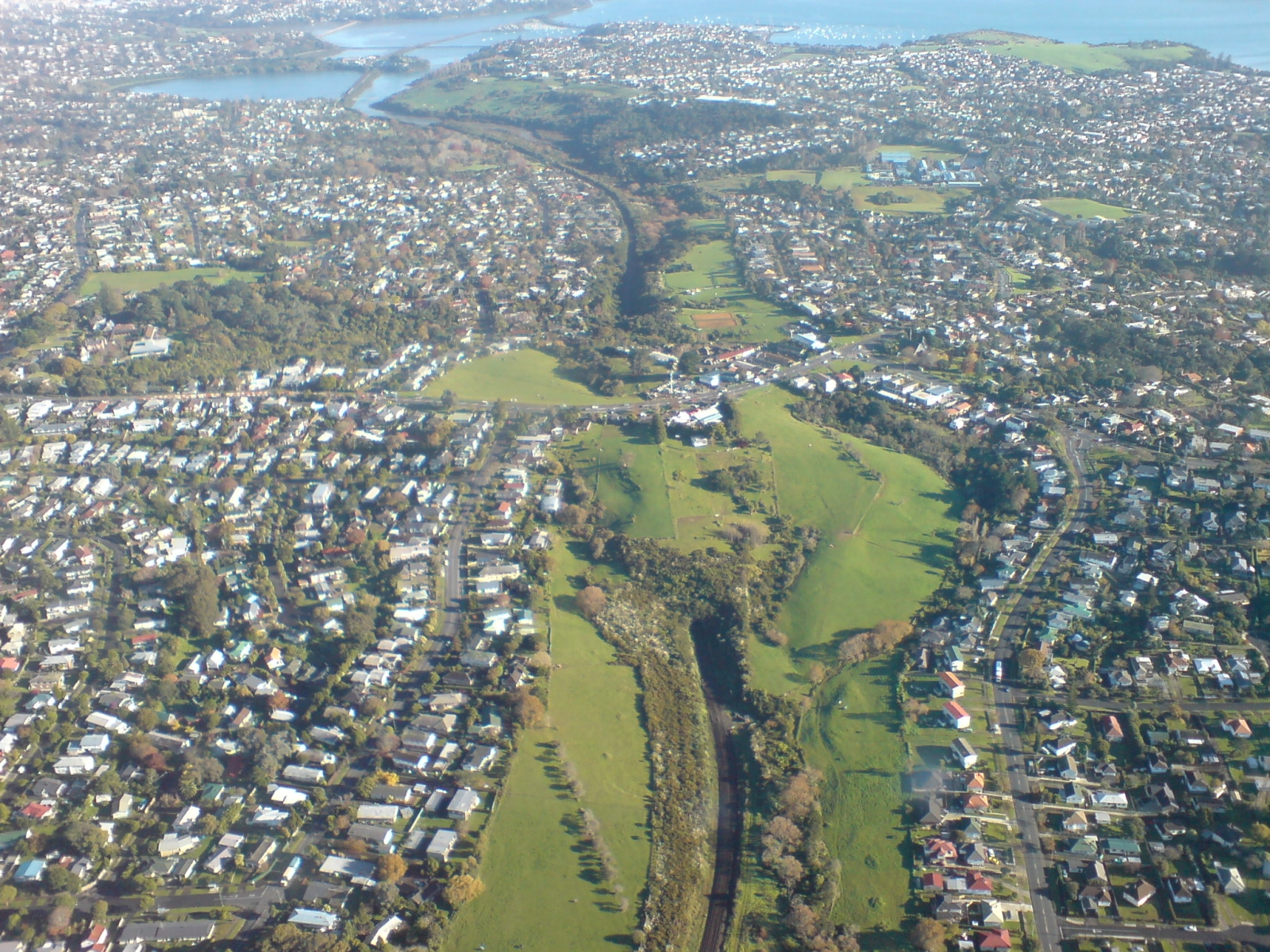
The Eastern Transport Corridor, from above Saint Johns

A strategy study in 2002 stated a need for a new motorway to be built in the corridor (as had been planned decades before) for a variety of reasons, including the need to make suburban streets safer and less polluted. In March 2004, Auckland City Mayor John Banks proposed a motorway scheme through Hobson Bay. There was substantial community and political resistance to the scheme, largely due to the cost of the proposal (equivalent to four years of the entire country's transport funding budget) and the impact it would have on a number of established neighbourhoods, as well as areas like Tamaki Drive, the Parnell Baths and several environmentally sensitive areas.

Even after revised designs, the impacts were still high, and with costs rising (with a worst case estimate of NZ$3.9 billion), the corridor was fast becoming a political boondoggle. The Auckland City Council transport and urban linkages committee decided on 10 December 2004 to scrap the planned motorway component in favour of improved public transport and increased capacity on existing local roads.

=== Shared path ===
In June 2014, Auckland Transport and Waka Kotahi announced plans for a shared pathway between Mechanics Bay and Glen Innes, to be completed in 5 stages, as part of their proposed Auckland Cycling Network. The pathway would be a 'Metro-style' path, providing total segregation from traffic along off-road routes. Stakeholder engagement was set to begin immediately, with construction starting in early 2015 and projected to be finished by 2019 at the latest.

By November of the same year, Auckland Transport had released more details of the project. The pathway construction was now projected to cost around $30 million, would stop at Tamaki Drive, not Mechanics Bay, and would be constructed in 4 sections, down from 5, between 2015 and 2018. The proposed route would have the path run from Glen Innes railway station, through Apirana Reserve to St Johns Rd, before entering the Pourewa Valley. Here, it would cross to the southern side of the tracks near Purewa Cemetery, and run as such until Orakei Rd, where it would cross one final time, before running along the northern side of the tracks across Hobson Bay and connecting to Tamaki Drive. An alternative route for Stage 4, between Orakei Rd and Tamaki Drive, was to cross the Pourewa Creek and run adjacent to Ngapipi Rd.

Section 1, between Merton Rd in Glen Innes and St Johns Rd, began construction in October 2015; at the time, the whole pathway was projected to be finished by late 2018. Section 1 was opened to the public on 9 December 2016, slightly later than its original opening date of mid-2016. By late May 2017, AT had released a short-list of 3 options for Stage 4 of the pathway, and by August, a preferred route was announced, moving the section from following the railway to following Ngapipi Rd. Adjustments to the width of the pre-existing Ōrākei Basin boardwalk began in March 2019, constituting the beginning of work on Section 3, and was opened on time in July of that year. Section 2, between Meadowbank railway station and St Johns Rd, and Section 4 were delayed due to funding constraints, but Section 2 began construction in mid-2020, after being delayed by the COVID-19 pandemic.

Section 2 was opened to the public in May 2022, allowing grade separated travel between Ōrākei railway station and Glen Innes for commuters. Work on Section 4 also began, in January 2022, and, subject to consent, was projected to open in early 2023.

Mana whenua gifted the name Te Ara ki Uta ki Tai to the pathway to act as its official name, at the same time as the opening of Section 1 in 2016.

== Connections ==
The pathway connects to many adjoining streets and facilities along its length. As of June 2022, they are: Merton Rd and Felton Mathew Avenue in Glen Innes, Glen Innes railway station, John Rymer Place in Kohimarama, Tahapa Crescent in Meadowbank, Meadowbank railway station, Orakei Rd, and Ōrākei railway station.

In the future, the path will also connect to Ngapipi Rd, as well as Tamaki Drive (which has its own separated cycling facilities) and the Glen Innes cycleways programme.

It has been suggested that the pathway could extend further south through the Eastern Transport Corridor in future, connecting to the cycleways and walkways of the Eastern Busway, as well as Panmure railway station and the busway itself.

== Gallery ==
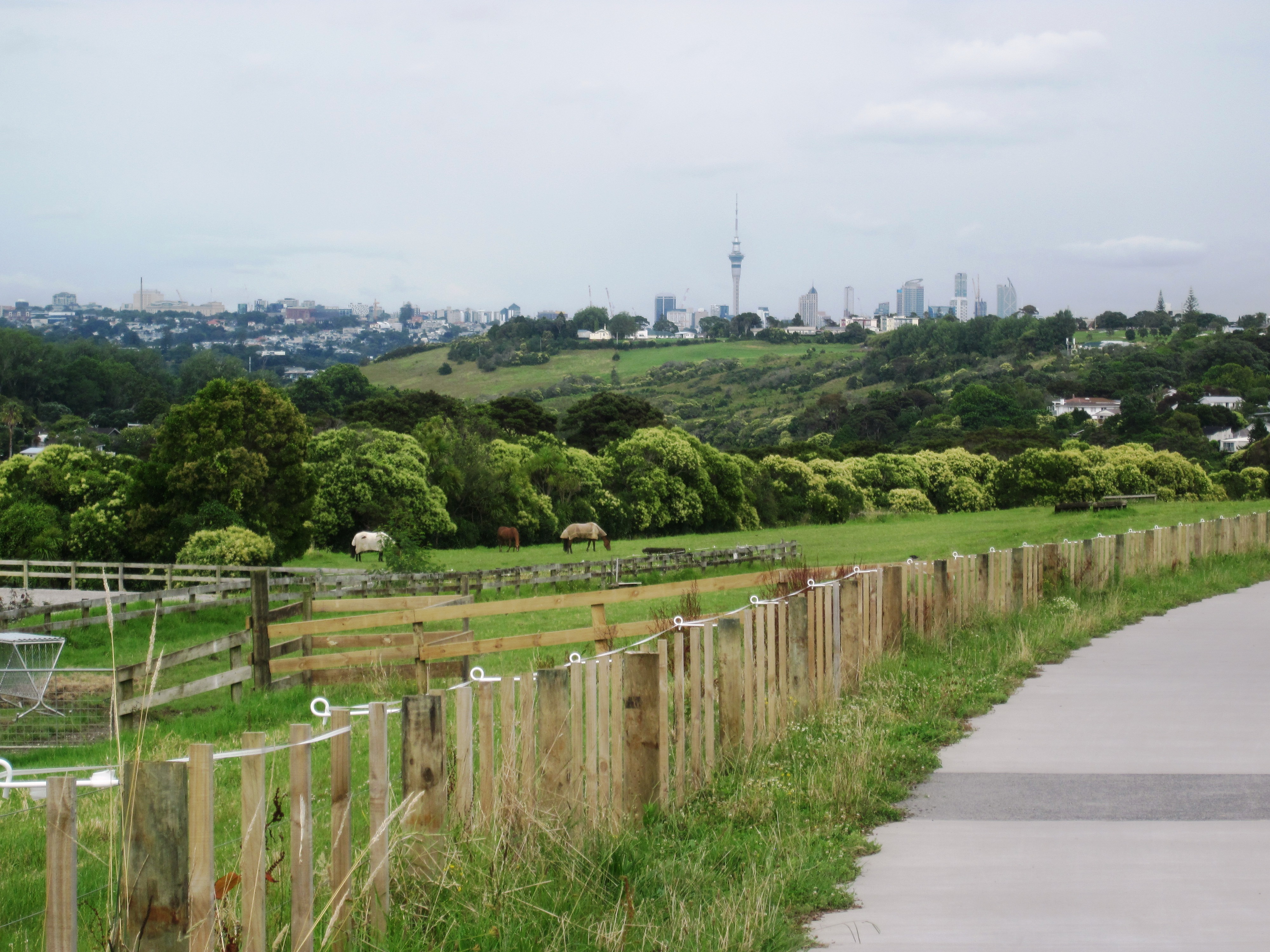
View of Meadowbank Pony Club and Auckland CBD from the pathway

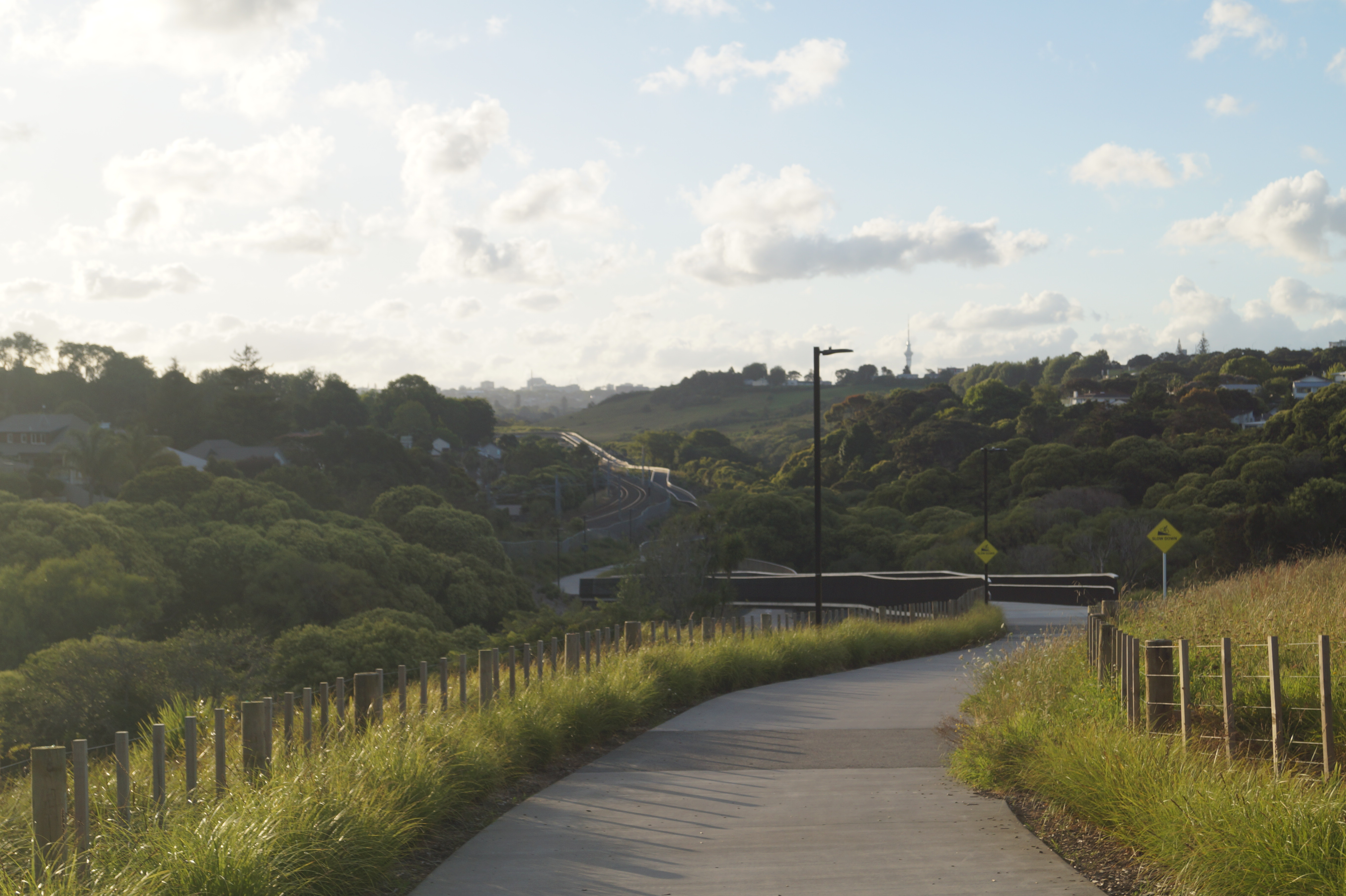
Te Ara ki Uta ki Tai, looking northwards from the Kohimarama Road entrance

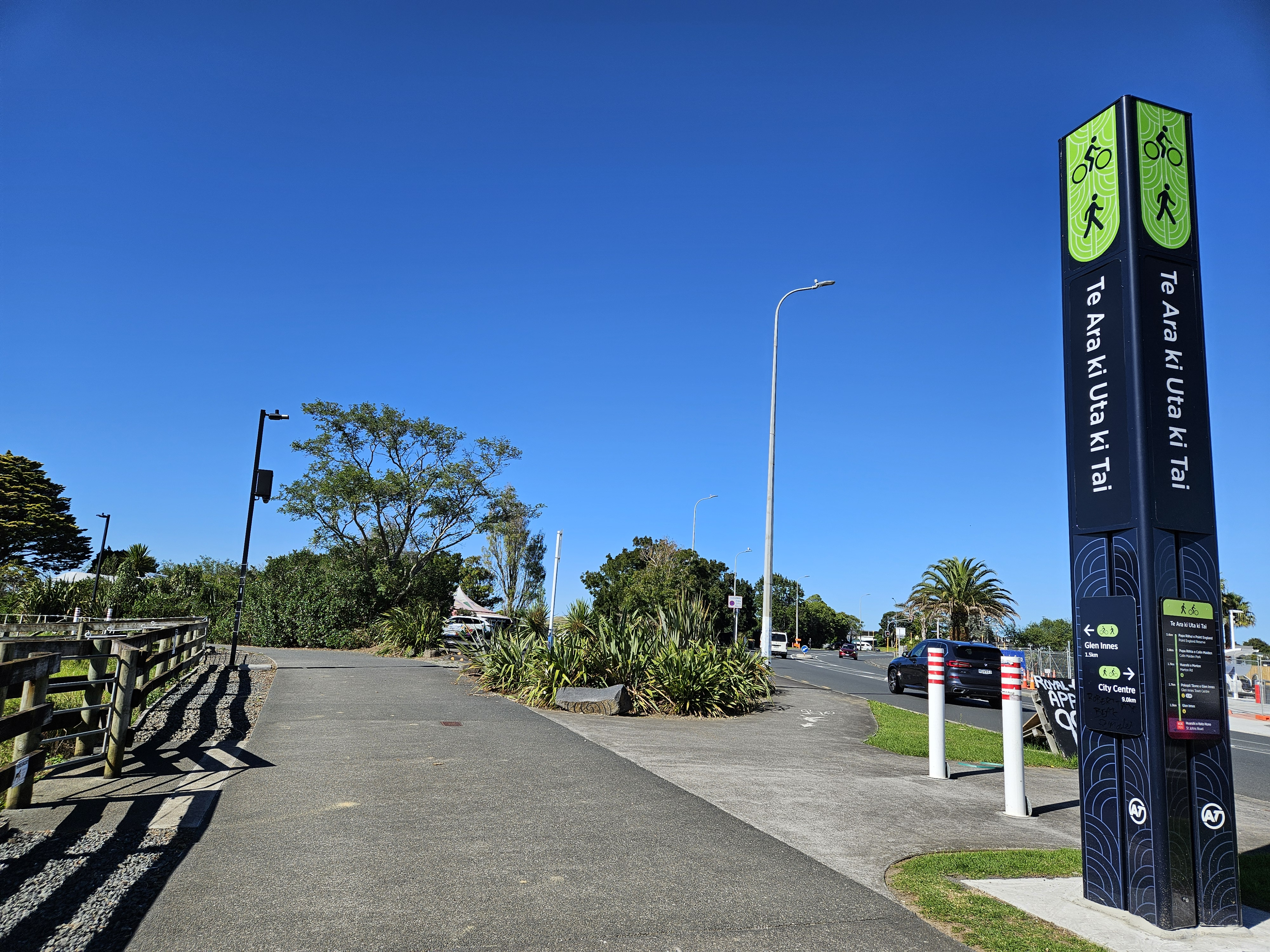
Saint Johns Road entrance to the southeastern section of Te Ara ki Uta ki Tai
