= Tamaki Drive =

Road in New Zealand

Coordinates: 36.849423°S 174.818484°E

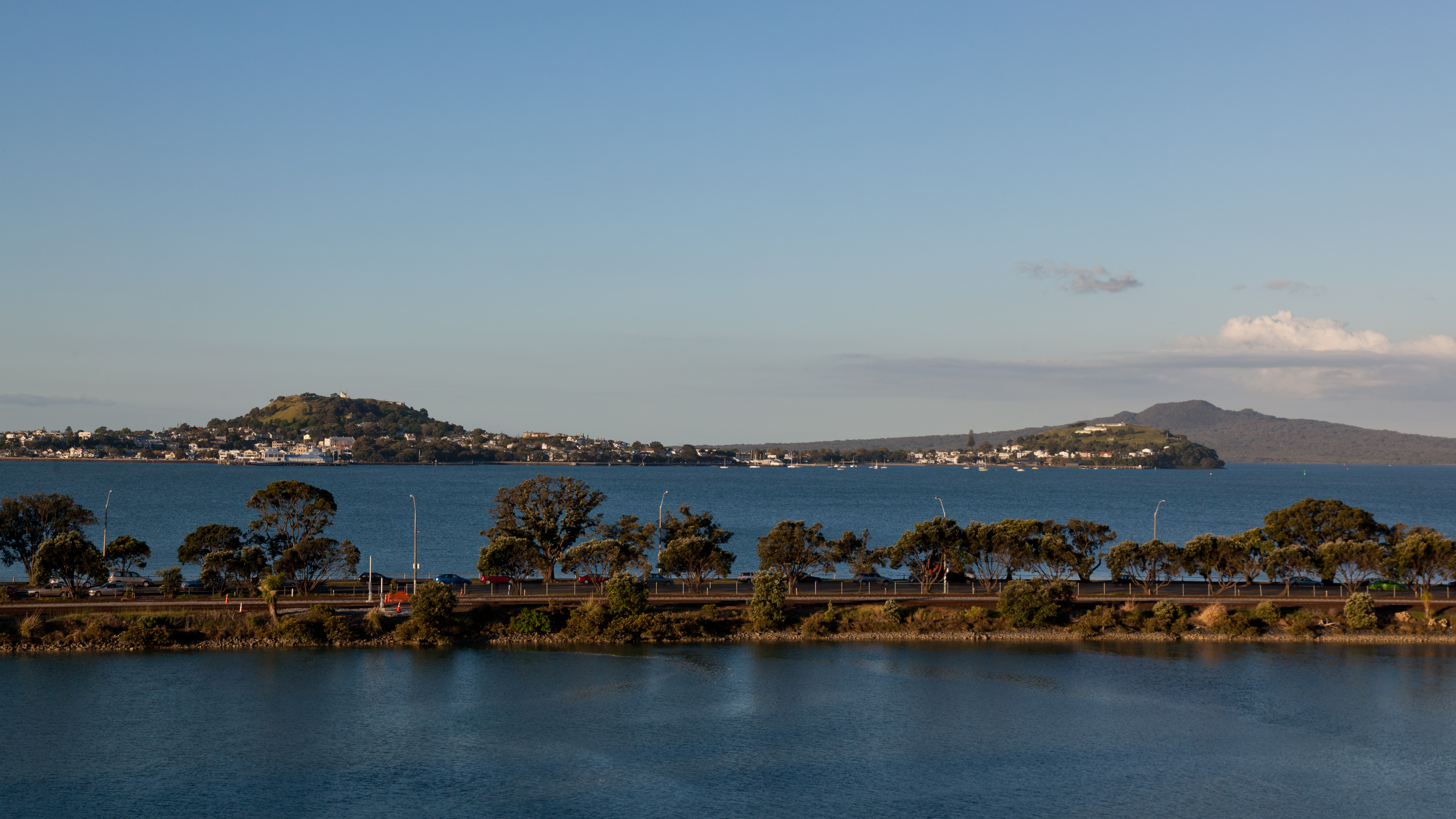
- View of Tamaki Drive from Hobson Bay, looking out towards North Head and Rangitoto Island

Route information
- Length: 5.1 mi (8.2 km)
- Existed: 1932–present

Location
- Country: New Zealand
- Districts: Ōrākei, Mission Bay, Kohimarama, Saint Heliers

Highway system
- New Zealand state highways; Motorways and expressways; List

Tamaki Drive is the coastal road which follows the contours of the Waitematā Harbour, Auckland, New Zealand. The road links the suburbs Ōrākei, Mission Bay, and Kohimarama ending in Saint Heliers providing easy access to the local beaches. Tamaki Drive was completed in 1932 and incorporates The Strand, Bice Esplanade and, what was once part of the old Kohimarama Road. It is also referred to as the Waterfront Road. Tamaki Drive is a flat road around 8 km (5 miles) long and popular with walkers, runners and roller skaters, and includes a dedicated cycle lane. Those travelling along Tamaki Drive can find scenic highlights and peaceful views across the harbour to the volcanic island Rangitoto. The cliffs backing onto Tamaki Drive are made of Waitematā Sandstone strata clothed in places with pōhutukawa. These trees seem to flower out of season, because these are actually Kermadec pōhutukawa with small distinctive roundish leaves.

== History ==
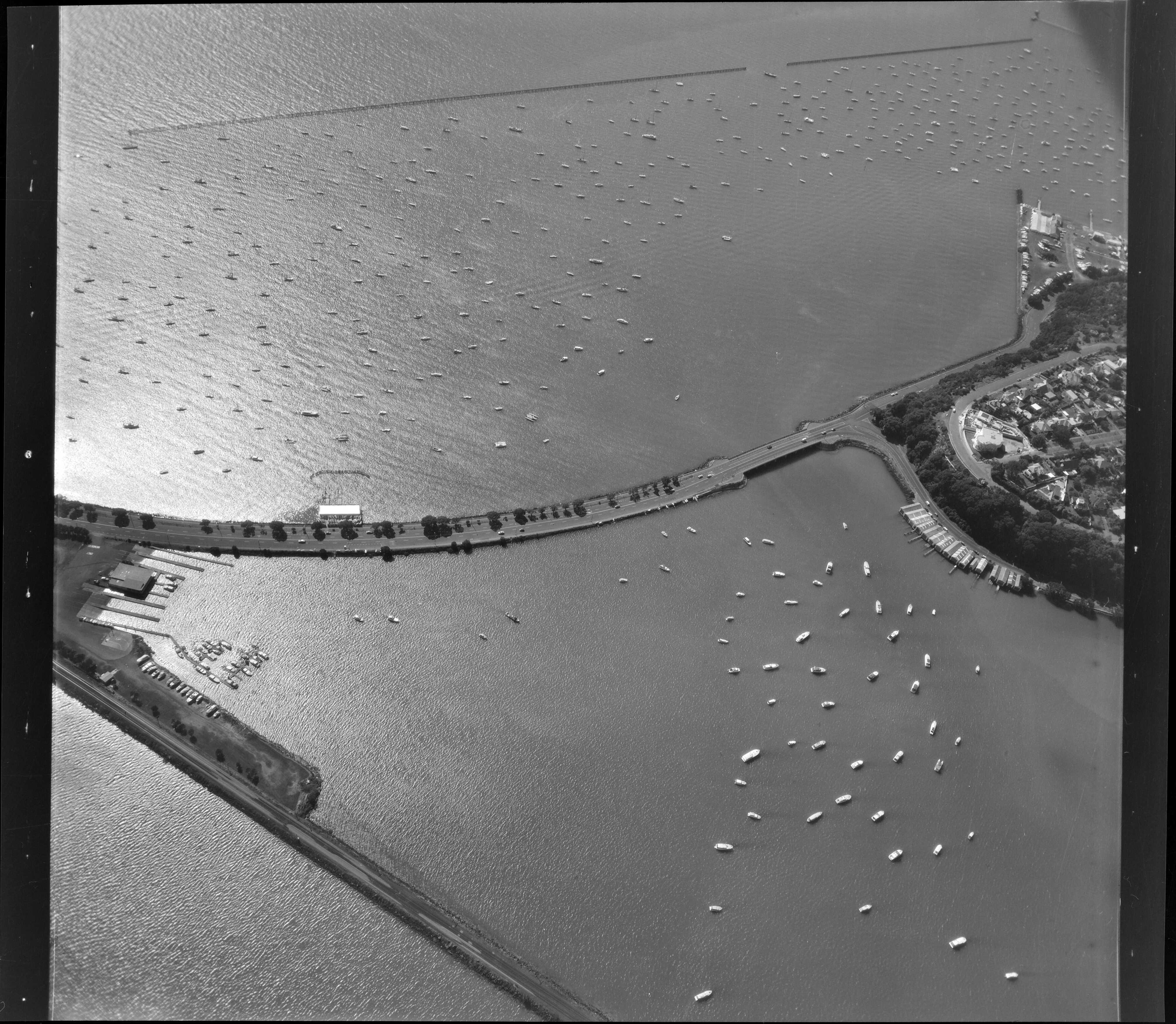
Aerial photo of Tamaki Drive and Hobson Point from 1988

The first Māori to settle on the foreshore found rich natural resources in and around the Waitematā Harbour, especially seafood. The seasonal fishing grounds brought many Māori here to fish, trade and socialise, making it a very desirable location, worth defending. Māori recognised early the strategic significance of Takaparawhau (Bastion Point), the cliff between Okahu Bay and Mission Bay with its panoramic outlook over the Waitematā Harbour.

Māori gave the area the name Tāmaki Makau Rau, meaning the isthmus desired by hundred lovers, this area is now encompassed by the City of Auckland. The name Tamaki Drive has since been given to the road which follows the coastline of the southern shore of the harbour. At the time when Europeans began to establish homes in the Auckland area, the Māori tribe (iwi), Ngāti Whātua Ōrākei controlled the area, with Okahu Bay serving as a key site, overlooked by Bastion Point. Ngāti Whātua continue to hold traditional authority (mana whenua) over this part of Auckland.

Though initially few European settlers lived on this part of the harbour, the colonial government sited their first infrastructure for the defence of Auckland here. Fort Bastion was built in 1886, to serve as a parallel installation to the establishment of batteries and submarine mining stations at North Head on the Harbour's northern entrance. This action was prompted by a rumoured threat of a Russian warship. Updated to defend the growing city in World War I, other guns were installed, but none were fired except in training. By World War II, this area was again an active military site, traces of which remain visible today.

After the War, the communities linked by Tamaki Drive became popular residential suburbs, and today locals and visitors are attracted to the popular beachfront walkway, water sports and café culture.

== Landmarks and features ==
Tamaki Drive is studded with several significant scenic landmarks, presented here from west to east.

=== Okahu Bay Reserve ===
The name Okahu Bay comes from the Māori Ōkahu, meaning "the dwelling place of Kahumatamomoe". It was the site of the home village of Ngāti Whātua, an important Māori iwi (tribe). The village was considered "a dreadful eyesore and potential disease centre" by the Auckland City Council, who forcibly evicted the inhabitants in 1952 under the Public Works Act, prior to the Queen Elizabeth II's Royal Tour of 1952-53. The marae and homes of evicted residents were burnt down and many residents were never able to return. Only the church and cemetery were left untouched. Ngāti Whatua elder Mihiata Taylor said that those who lived through the eviction "still carried that hurt with us."

Today, the reserve at Ōkahu Bay is a popular location for Aucklanders to relax and enjoy the waterfront. It is possible to go out onto the water with kayaks, which are available for rent at the west-side of the bay. Kelly Tarlton's Sea Life Aquarium on the east-side of the bay is one of New Zealand's favourite attractions. The Royal Akarana Yacht Club is located in the west-corner of the bay. The bay has a boat ramp, a jetty, picnic facilities and toilets.

=== Ōrākei Domain ===
When crossing Tamaki Drive to the landward side Okahu Bay borders onto the Ōrākei Domain. This park has a sports ground located beside the waterfront for sports such as soccer, rugby and cricket. An adventure playground for children is another feature. The Domain is home to the Teachers Eastern Rugby Club and the Ōrākei Bowling Club. The Ngake Reserve, a pleasant open green space, is located at the top of the Ōrākei Domain.

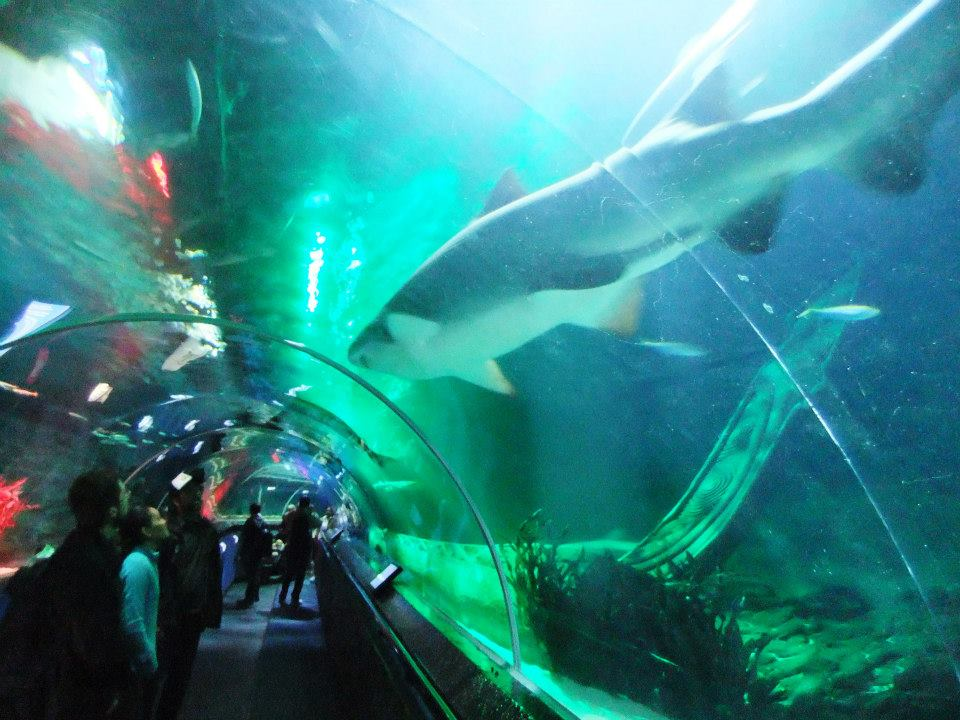
Kelly Tarlton Aquarium

=== Kelly Tarlton's Sea Life Aquarium ===
In 1985 diver Kelly Tarlton established Kelly Tarlton's Sea Life Aquarium in Auckland. His vision was to create an underwater facility where visitors could admire marine life by travelling on a moving platform around various tunnels. The redundant storm water and sewage tanks at Bastion Point provided the perfect site. The aquarium holds around 2,000 fish from some 40 species, including stingrays and sharks, most of which can be observed while walking through the underwater tunnel.

=== Bastion Point ===
Bastion Point, located at the west end of the Mission Bay, had strategic importance for both Māori and Pākehā. Its commanding view over the entrance to the Waitematā Harbour made it a key site for the defence of Māori settlements and later of Auckland City.

Traces of the colonial defences remain from the establishment of Fort Bastion here in 1886. Initially the Battery defending the harbour entrance had two 'disappearing guns', supplemented by two 6 pounders, with a magazine linked to covered passages and a search light mounted on Bastion Rock. At sea level, the submarine mining depot was set up at Biddick's Bay, opposite its northern equivalent across the harbour at Torpedo Bay. Fort Bastion covered the seaward approaches, the Motukorea and Rangitoto Channels.

The defence forces abandoned Fort Bastion by the 1920s, but the site was re-activated in World War II. With the Savage Memorial being built over the earlier Artillery storage tunnels from 1940–1943, the Battery was now sited on the cliff top above the Tamaki Yacht Club, initially with 12 pounders guns, later replaced by more efficient 6 pounders. At water-level, two guns were installed below the Tamaki Yacht Club on the by-now flattened Bastion Rock. A boom linking Torpedo Bay with Bastion Point across the harbour was designed to prevent enemy submarines reaching Auckland. An anti-aircraft battery, three searchlight emplacements, an observation post, radar station and a camp to house the expanding military personnel required to man these installations made this a vital installation.

Mission Bay and its neighbour, Ōrākei, achieved national attention in 1977 when Māori protestors occupied vacant land at Bastion Point. Land which had formerly belonged to the Ngāti Whātua iwi had been acquired cheaply for public works many decades before, and members of the iwi occupied the land for 507 days demanding its return. The site was largely returned to the iwi after a long and not entirely bloodless occupation. The occupation was a pivotal event in shaping the processes by which the Crown investigated breaches of the Treaty of Waitangi. The Waitangi Tribunal, set up in 1975, became empowered in 1985 to include historical grievances as far back as 1840.

Bastion Point is also the location of the Tomb and Memorial Garden for Michael Joseph Savage. He is one of New Zealand's most popular Prime Ministers and renowned as the architect of the welfare state. This Art Deco ensemble designed by Tibor Donner and Anthony Bartlett was officially opened in March 1943, and the whole memorial stands on consecrated ground.

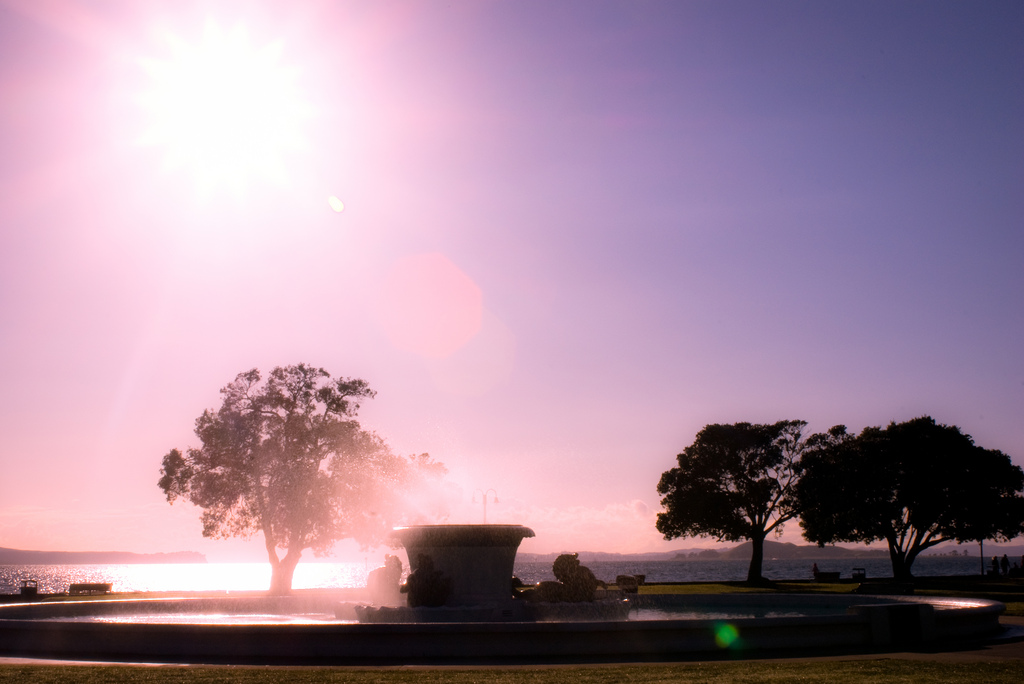
Trevor Moss Davis Memorial Fountain

=== Mission Bay Reserve ===
This is the open green space between Tamaki Drive and Mission Bay Beach. It is also called Selwyn Reserve, after the first Anglican bishop of New Zealand, George Augustus Selwyn. The centre piece of the Mission Bay Reserve is the Trevor Moss Davis Memorial Fountain. Trevor Moss Davis was director of the Auckland liquor firm Hancock and Company and died of a sudden heart attack in 1947 at the age of 45. His father Eliot Davis, nephew of Sir Ernest Davis, Auckland mayor from 1935 to 1945, gifted a memorial fountain at Mission Bay to keep the memory of his son alive. The fountain was designed by architect George Tole and created by Richard Gross. It is constructed of Sicilian marble fluted to catch the light and decorated with three bronze sea monsters gushing water. The memorial is a landmark on the city's waterfront, regularly, sending dancing jets of water as high as 12 m (40 ft) in the air and at night it features a spectacular light show. During the summer young children use it as a paddling pool.

=== Kohimarama Beach ===
Kohimarama Beach is the longest beach along Tamaki Drive and is mainly used for swimming. It is located east of the Kohimarama Yacht Club and many boat races are held there. There are boat ramps, bicycle stands and toilets present as services for visitors and locals.

=== St. Heliers Bay and Beach Reserve ===
This reserve is one of Auckland's premier waterfront destinations. The bay is popular for swimming and has a boat ramp, making it a busy location on sunny days. St. Heliers Bay was named by Major Walmsley in the late 1870s, who owned and managed Auckland's first stud farm at Glen Orchard in 1879. The bay supposedly reminded him of the fashionable holiday resort Saint Helier, in Jersey, one of Britain's Channel Islands.

== Events ==
Round The Bays – This annual event is the result of the international running boom of the 1970s and 1980s, during which millions of people took up running. The Auckland Round the Bays Fun Run is one of the largest in the world, and was initiated by the Auckland Joggers Club in the early 1970s. The run is 8.4 km along Tamaki Drive, and follows the contours of the Waitematā Harbour, past Hobson Bay, Okahu Bay, Mission Bay, Kohimarama Beach, and finishing in St Heliers Bay Reserve. Nowadays it is estimated that between 70,000 and 80,000 runners participate each year.

== Gallery ==
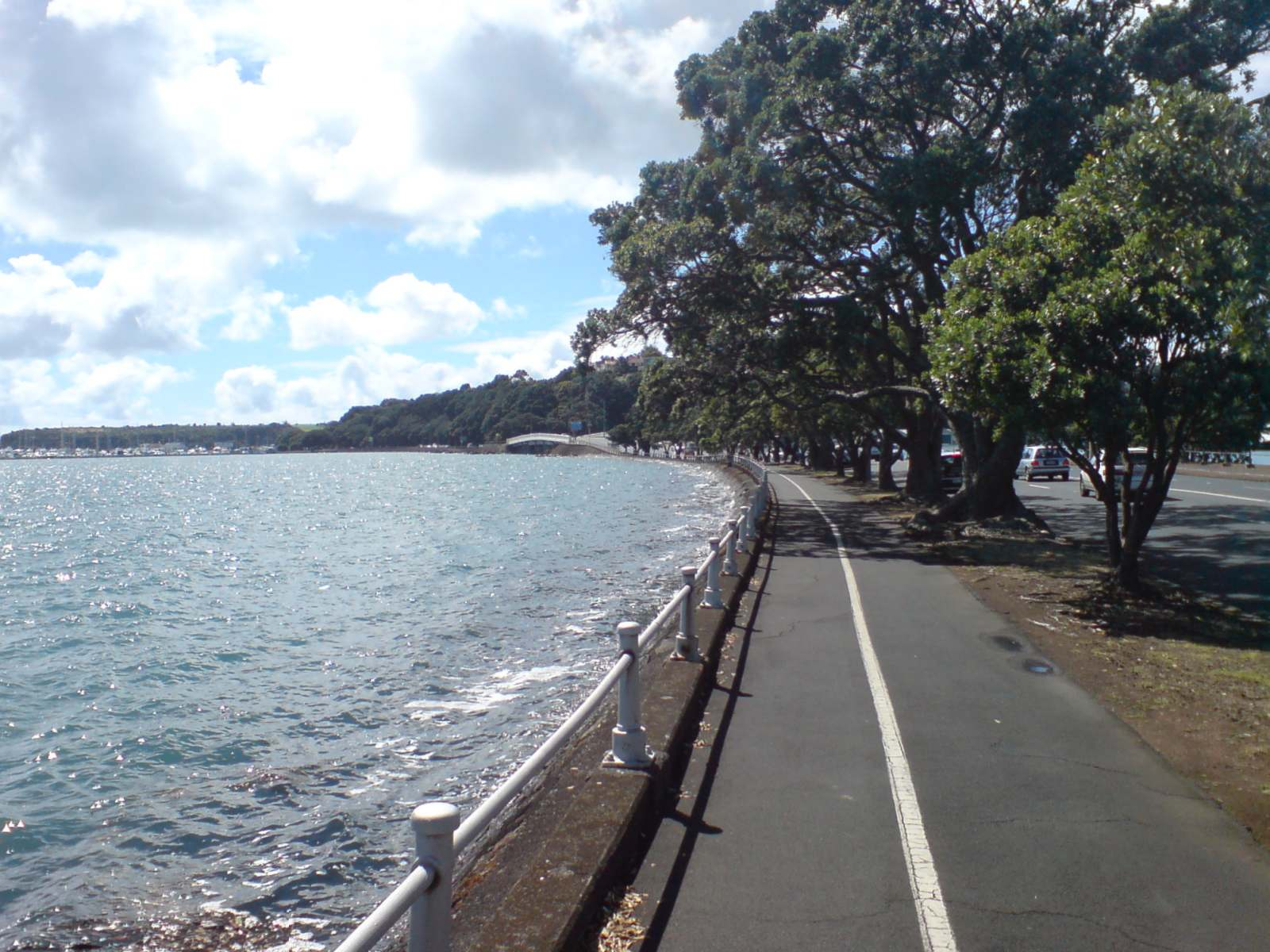
Tamaki Drive Sweeping Close to the Water

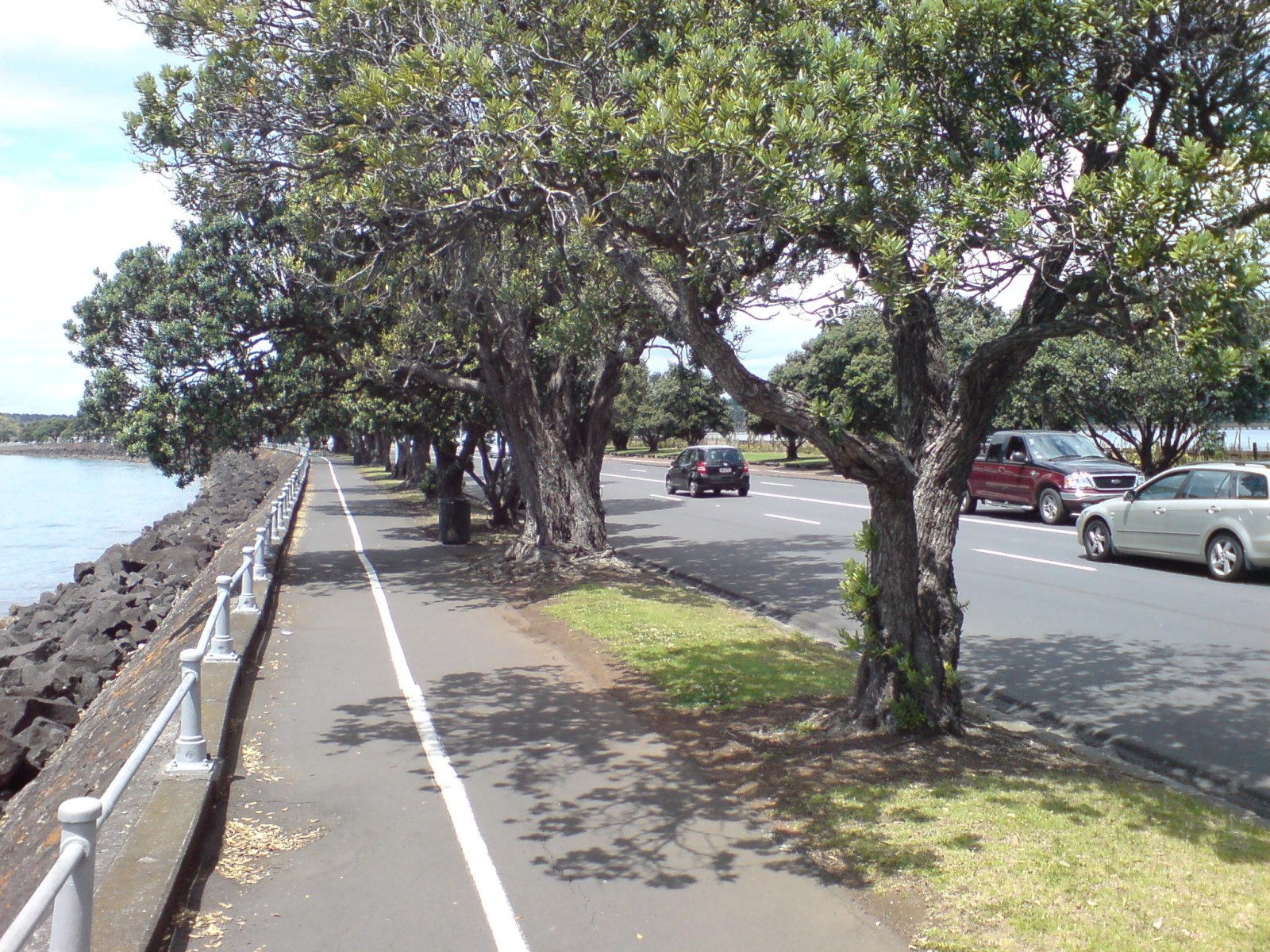
Tamaki Drive Cycleway on a Sunny Day

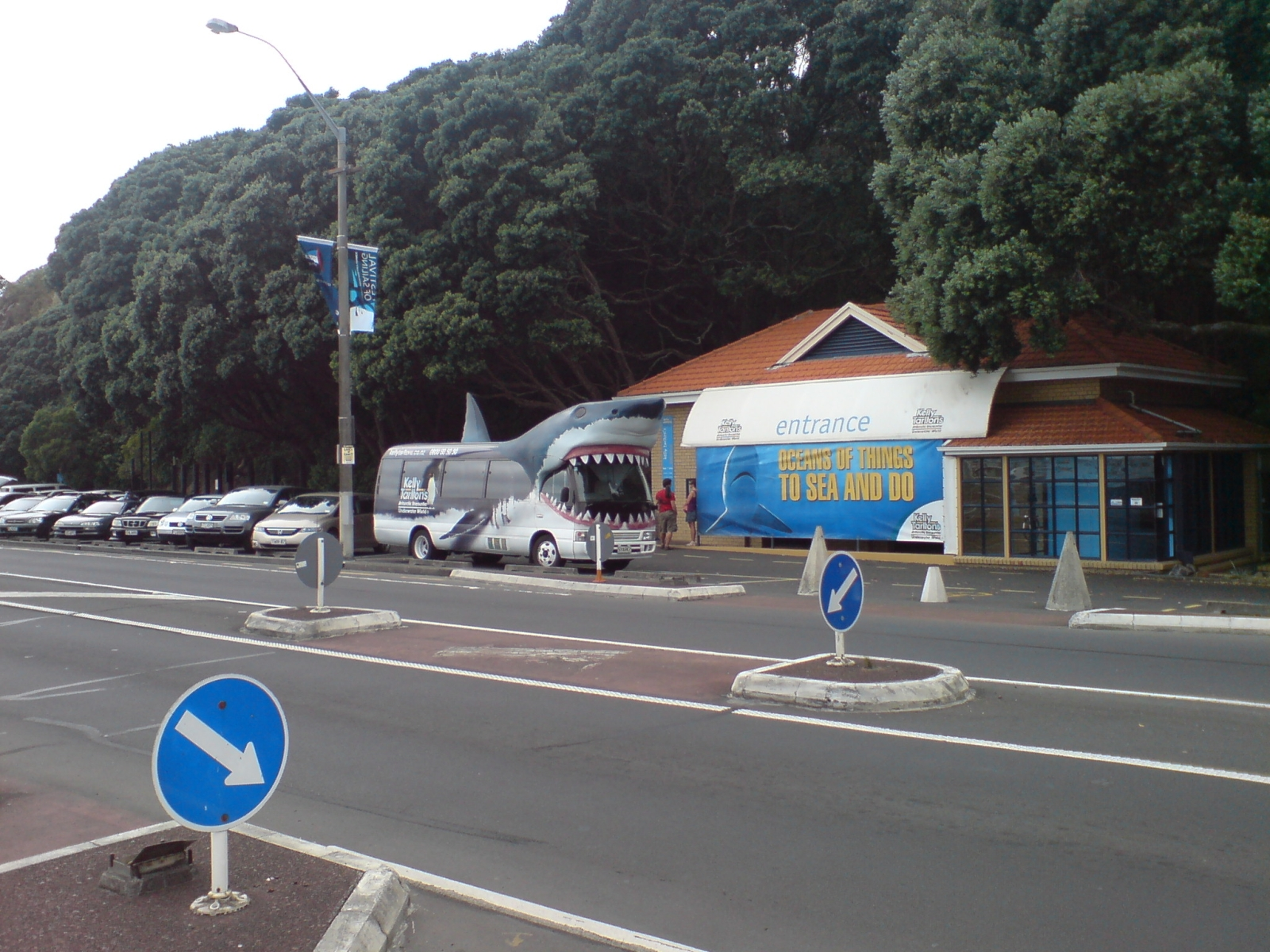
Kelly Tarlton's Entrance and Shark Bus

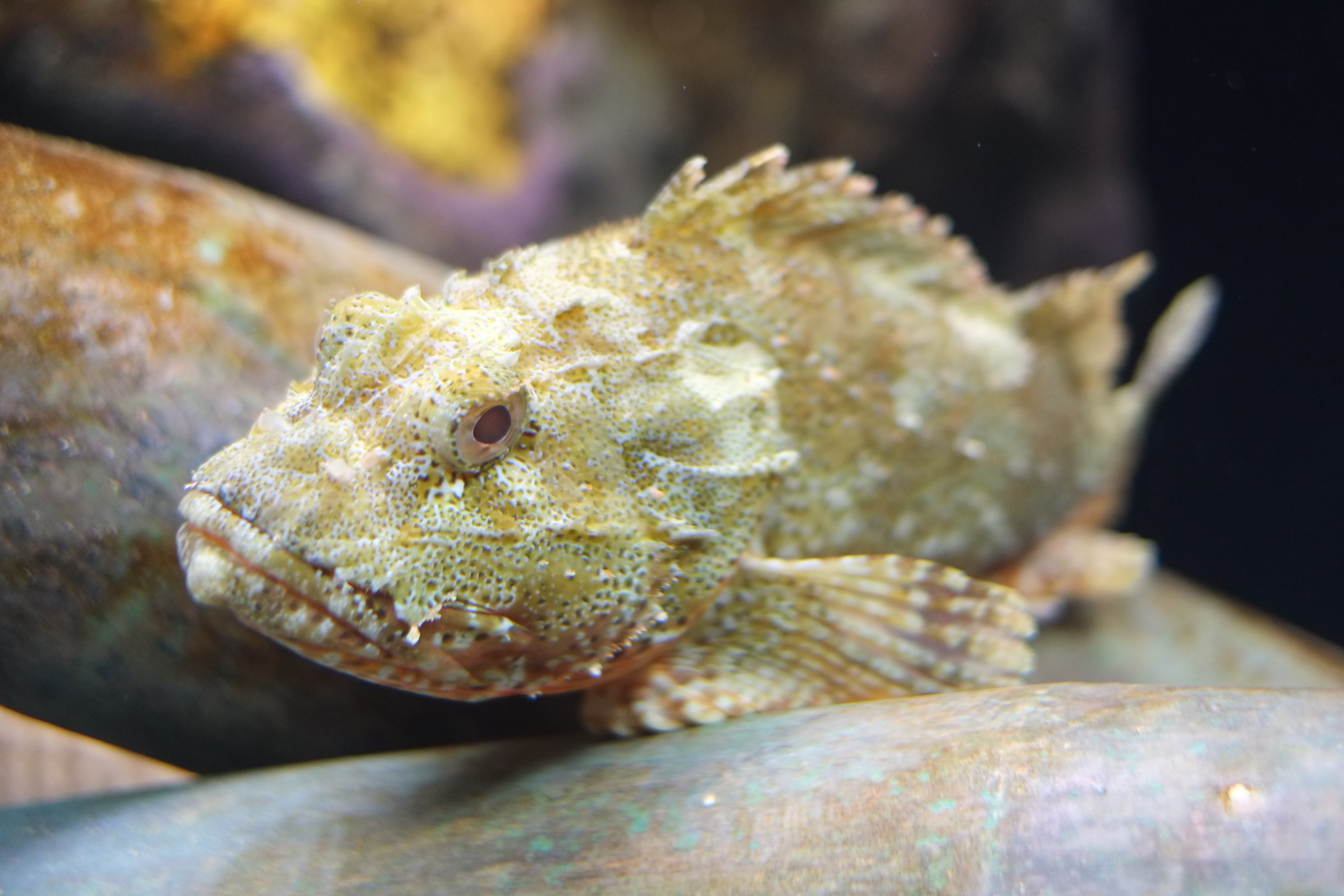
Scorpion Fish at Kelly Tarlton's

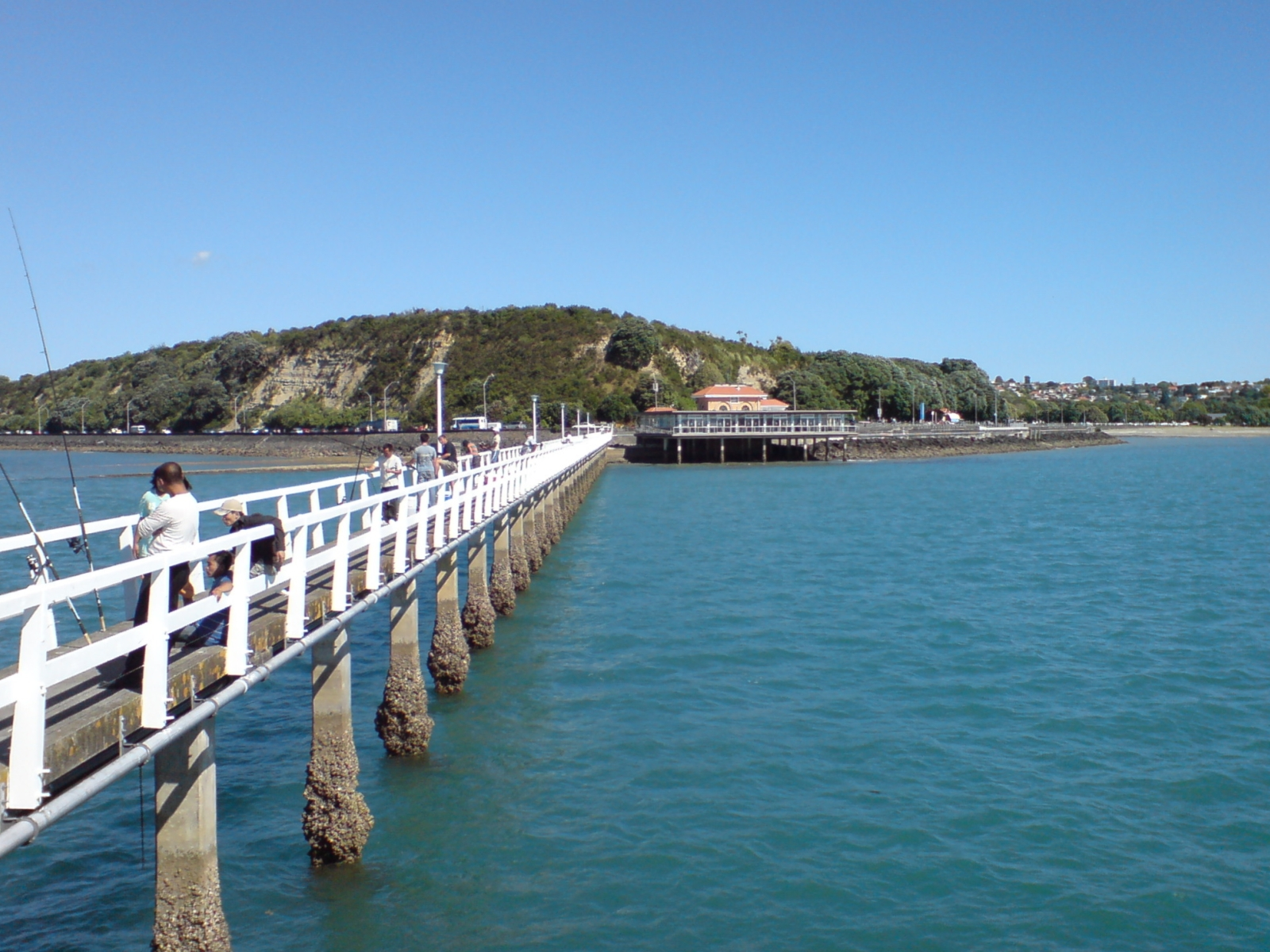
Fishing Fish Off Bastion Point

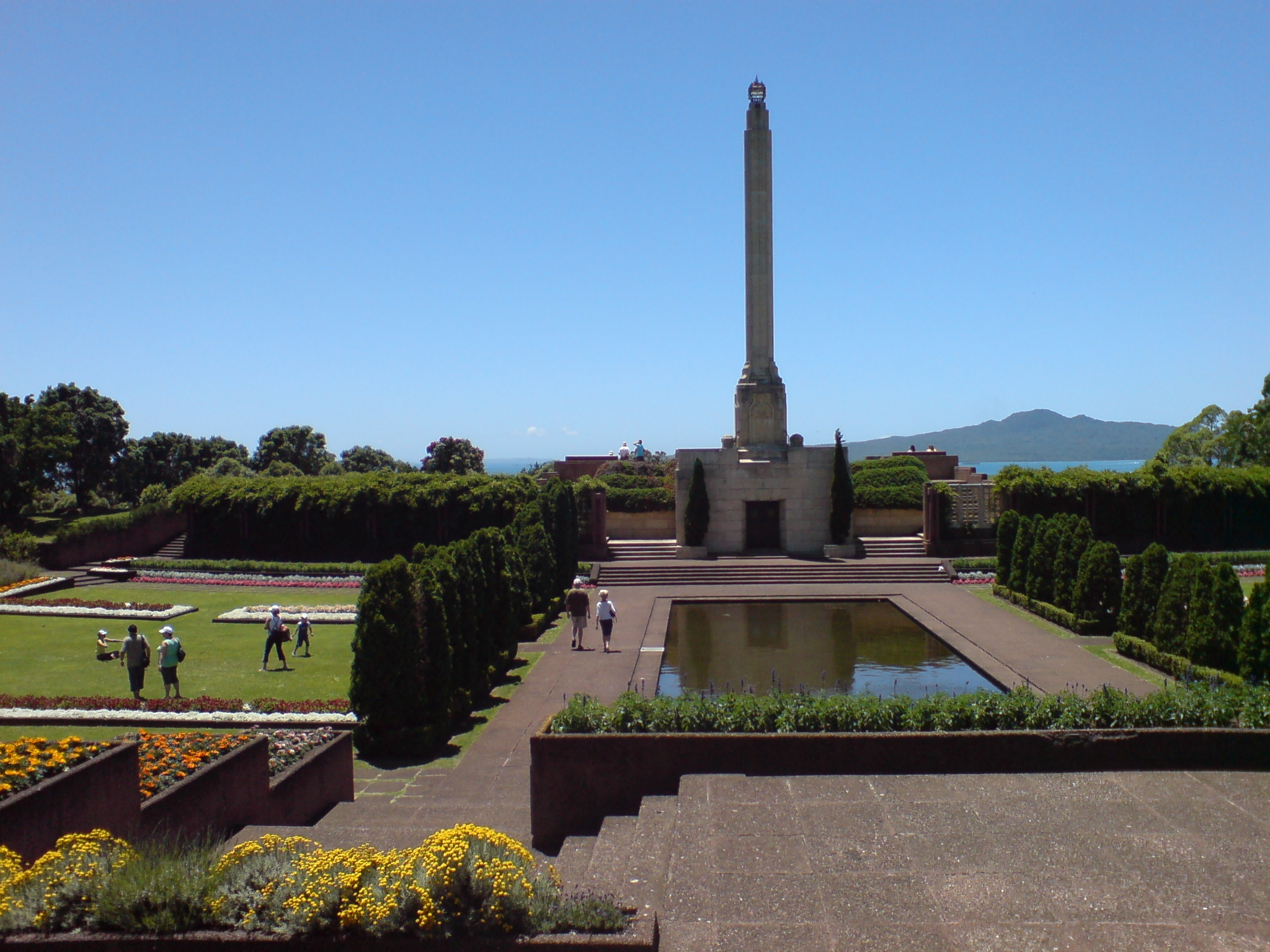
Michael Joseph Savage Memorial Park

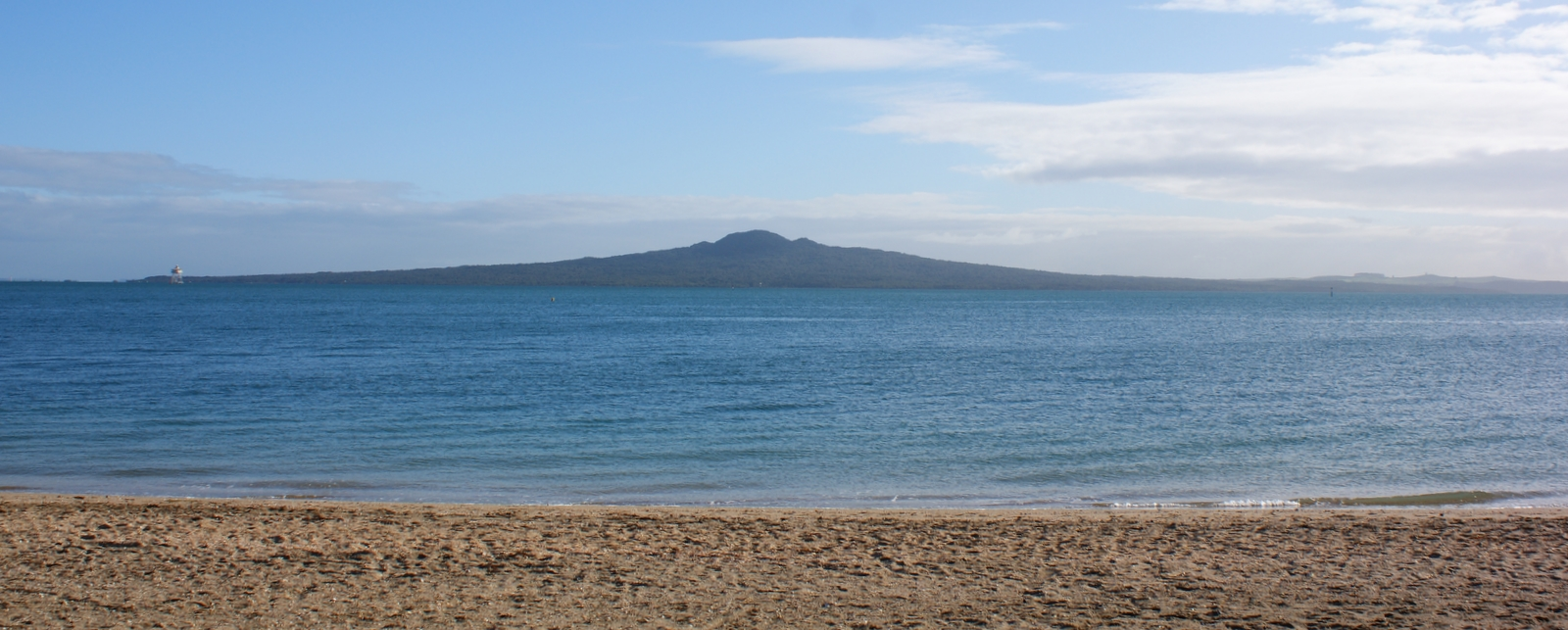
View of Rangitoto from Mission Bay

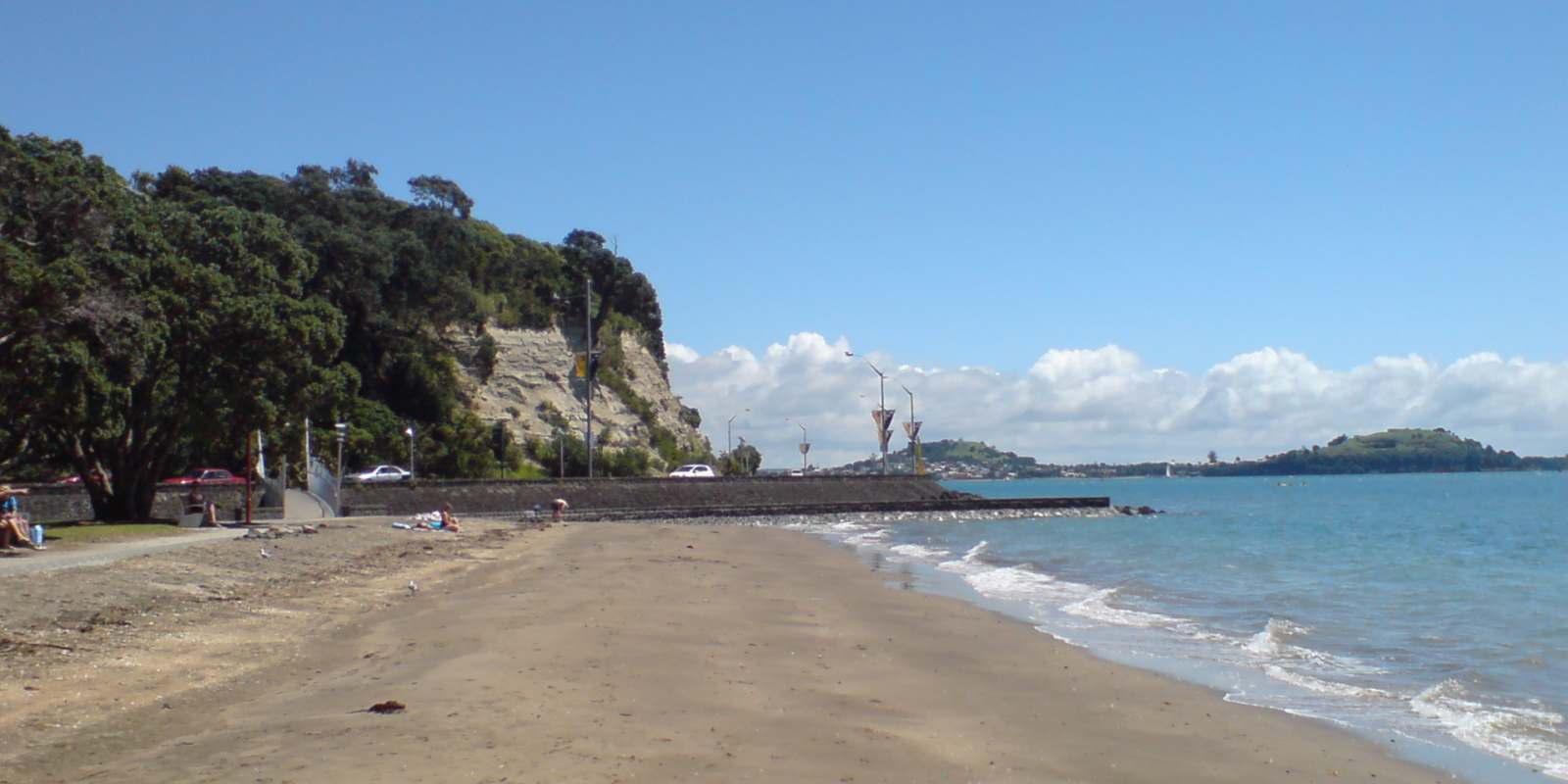
View of Mission Bay Beach looking west
