= Hobson Bay =

Bay in Auckland, New Zealand

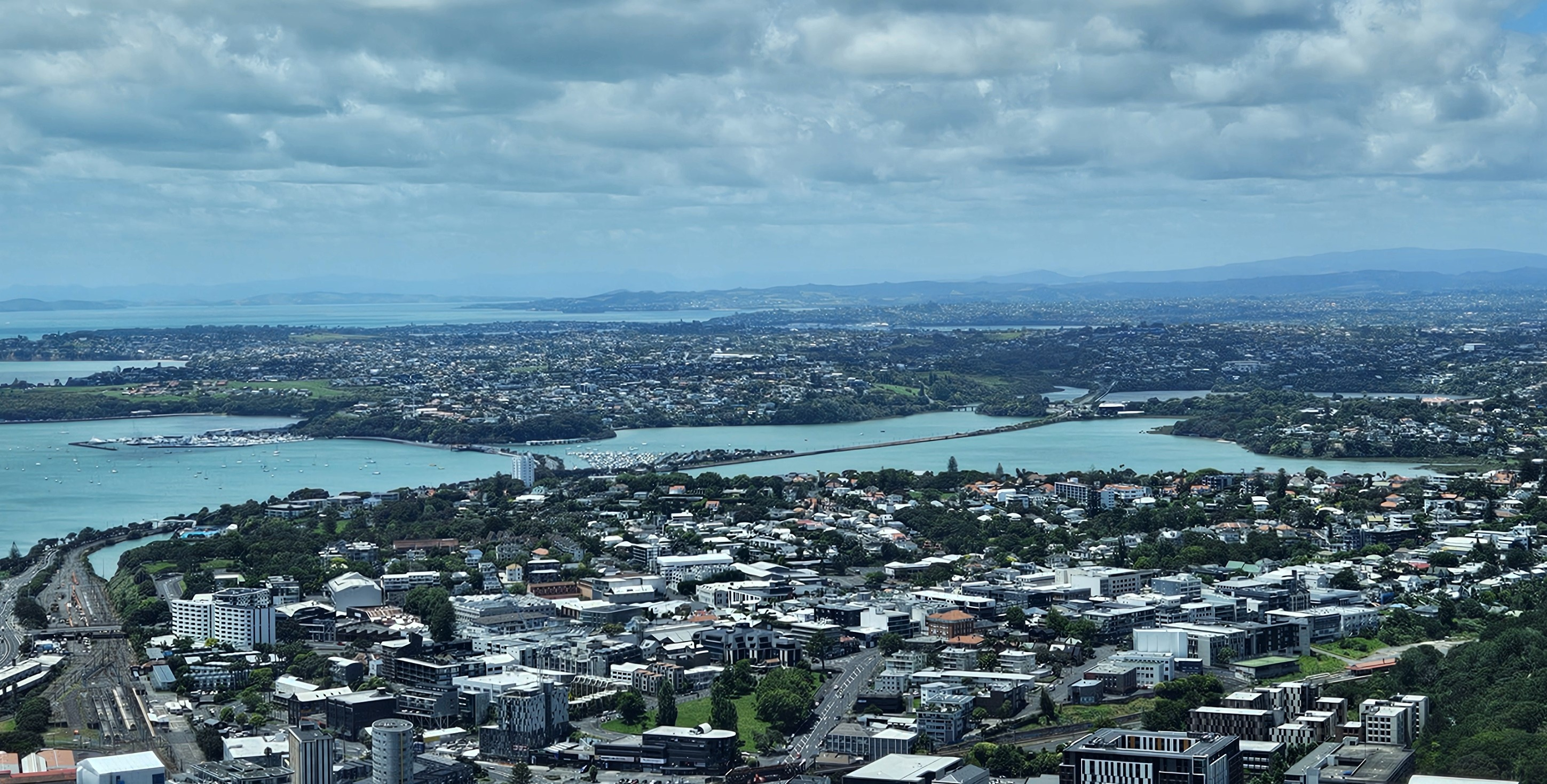
- View of Hobson Bay from the Sky Tower

- Location within the Auckland Region
- Location: Auckland Region, New Zealand
- Coordinates: 36.858°S 174.794°E
- Ocean/sea sources: Waitematā Harbour

Hobson Bay is a bay in the Auckland Region of New Zealand's North Island. It is located to the east of the Auckland City Centre, and is bisected by the Eastern Line and Tamaki Drive.

== Description ==
Hobson Bay is a tidal inlet of the Waitematā Harbour, surrounded by the suburbs of Parnell, Remuera and Ōrākei. The Pourewa Creek and Orakei Creek both flow into the bay. A 700-metre-wide (2,300 ft) volcanic maar, the Ōrākei Basin, is found to the south-east of the bay.

== Biodiversity ==
The bay is lined with mangroves.

== History ==
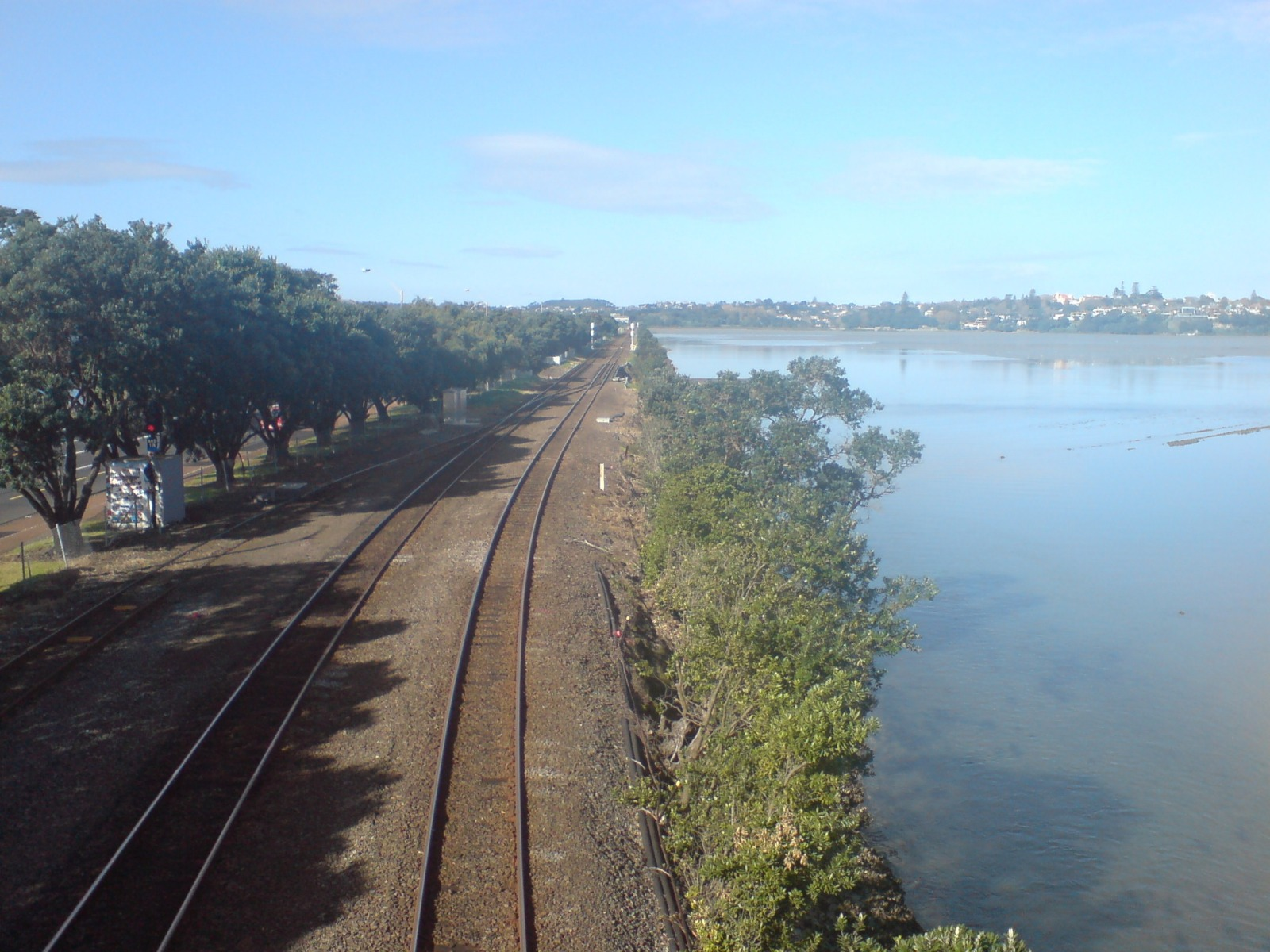
Tamaki Drive and Eastern Line at the entrance to Hobson Bay

The traditional Tāmaki Māori name for the bay is Te Waitaramoa, either meaning "the bay of the first rays of sun", or a reference to Rubus cissoides (tātarāmoa or bush lawyer). The bay was an important fishing resource for Tāmaki Māori. The headlands of the bay were home to two Waiohua pā, home to two twin brothers, Hupiku and Humataitai, in the early 1700s. To the east was Te Pokanoa a Tarahape Pā, a name which references Tarahape, a wife of Ika-maupoho, paramount chief of Waiohua. The western headland at Point Resolution was home to the Taurarua Pā. Both pā were taken by Ngāti Whātua in the 1700s.

Ngāti Whātua Ōrākei rangatira Te Tinana had a kāinga to the south of Hobson Bay. The area was included in the Ōhinerau Block sale to the Crown in 1851. During the early colonial era, the bay was named after the first Governor of New Zealand, William Hobson. In 1885, Fort Resolution was constructed at Point Resolution in response to fears of invasion by the Russian Empire. The fort led to the destruction of the Taurarua Pā site.

A sewage plant was opened at Ōkahu Bay, to the north-east of Hobson Bay, in 1908 (now the site of Kelly Tarlton's Sea Life Aquarium). The sewage plant caused significant pollution in the bay, including the Ngāti Whātua Ōrākei village found on the bay's shores. Over time, Hobson Bay became more silted and shallow due to the sewage plant.

In 1925, the Eastern Line was constructed in the middle of the bay, joined by Tamaki Drive in 1926, a road linking Parnell to Ōrākei at the mouth of the bay.

In the early 2000s, mayor John Banks proposed a new motorway for Auckland along the Eastern Transport Corridor to pass through Hobson Bay, either as a tunnel or above ground motorway.

In 2010, the ageing sewage tunnels underneath the bay were reconstructed.

== Amenities ==
The Hobson Bay Walkway can be found along the shores of the bay, and was constructed in 2006. Te Ara ki Uta ki Tai is an active shared path that extends from Hobson Bay to Glen Innes.
