= Eastern Motorway =

Eastern Motorway may refer to various motorways, including:

- Tauranga Eastern Motorway, Tauranga, New Zealand
- Eastern Transport Corridor, a planned but since cancelled new motorway in Auckland, New Zealand
- Ostautobahn, a motorway in the east of Austria
