= Kohimarama =

- Suburb
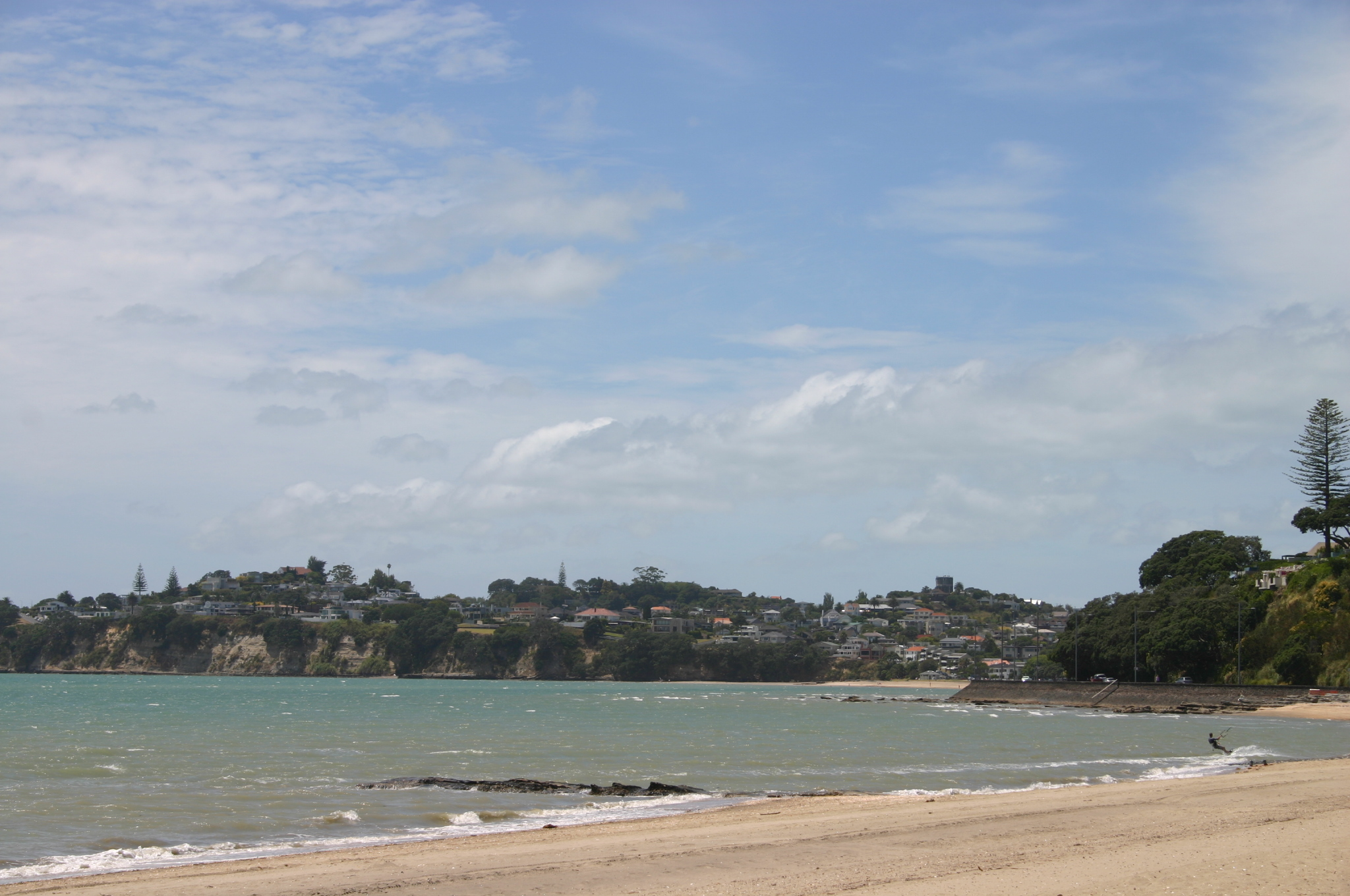
- View of Kohimarama Beach
- Interactive map of Kohimarama
- Coordinates: 36.859074°S 174.845808°E
- Country: New Zealand
- City: Auckland
- Local authority: Auckland Council
- Electoral ward: Ōrākei ward
- Local board: Ōrākei Local Board

Area
  - Land: 152 ha (380 acres)

Population (June 2025)
  - Total: 4,450
  - Density: 2,930/km^{2} (7,580/sq mi)

Waitematā Harbour, Devonport	Rangitoto Island, Tamaki Drive	Hauraki Gulf, Browns Island
Mission Bay, Ōrākei, Okahu Bay	Kohimarama	Saint Heliers
Meadowbank	St Johns	Glen Innes, Glendowie

Kohimarama is a coastal residential suburb of Auckland, New Zealand, located to the east of the city. Kohimarama is situated between Mission Bay and St Heliers and has an accessible beach with a boardwalk and green recreational spaces located amongst residential areas. Local government of Kohimarama is the responsibility of the Ōrākei Local Board, which also includes the suburbs of Ōrākei, Mission Bay, St Heliers, Glendowie, St Johns, Meadowbank, Remuera and Ellerslie.

== Demographics ==
Kohimarama covers 1.52 km^{2} (0.59 sq mi) and had an estimated population of 4,450 as of June 2025, with a population density of 2,928 people per km^{2}.

Historical population
Year	Pop.	±% p.a.
2006	4,035	—
2013	4,143	+0.38%
2018	4,350	+0.98%
2023	4,302	−0.22%

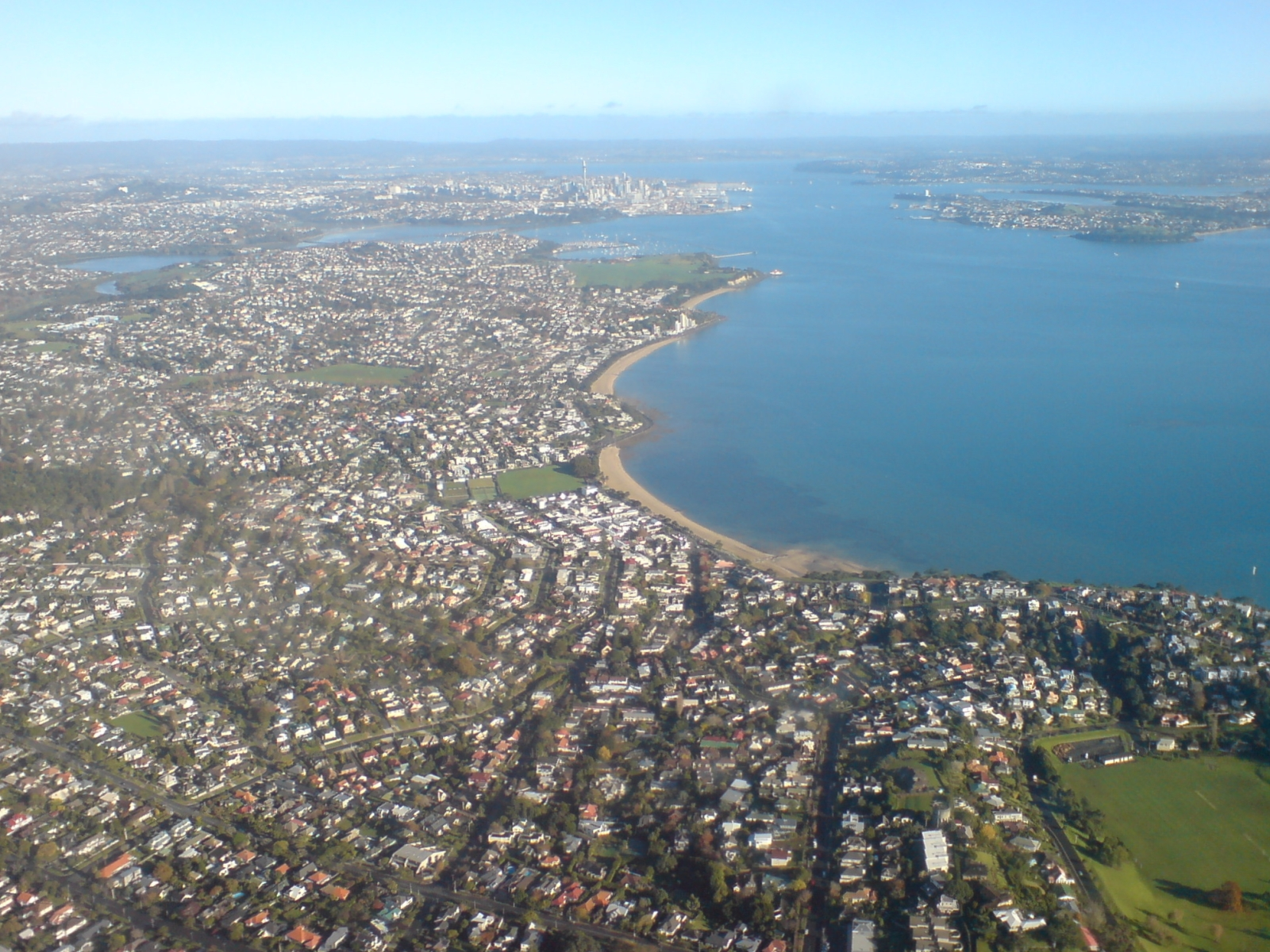
Looking west over the Eastern Beaches, Kohimarama in the middle distance. The three beaches are: in the foreground St Heliers, then Kohimarama, lastly Mission Bay.

Kohimarama had a population of 4,302 in the 2023 New Zealand census, a decrease of 48 people (−1.1%) since the 2018 census, and an increase of 159 people (3.8%) since the 2013 census. There were 2,067 males, 2,223 females and 15 people of other genders in 1,722 dwellings. 3.6% of people identified as LGBTIQ+. The median age was 45.2 years (compared with 38.1 years nationally). There were 720 people (16.7%) aged under 15 years, 606 (14.1%) aged 15 to 29, 2,034 (47.3%) aged 30 to 64, and 939 (21.8%) aged 65 or older.

People could identify as more than one ethnicity. The results were 82.1% European (Pākehā); 4.3% Māori; 1.4% Pasifika; 15.5% Asian; 2.6% Middle Eastern, Latin American and African New Zealanders (MELAA); and 2.6% other, which includes people giving their ethnicity as "New Zealander". English was spoken by 97.1%, Māori language by 0.8%, Samoan by 0.2%, and other languages by 20.8%. No language could be spoken by 1.5% (e.g. too young to talk). New Zealand Sign Language was known by 0.1%. The percentage of people born overseas was 36.5, compared with 28.8% nationally.

Religious affiliations were 39.3% Christian, 1.9% Hindu, 0.7% Islam, 0.1% Māori religious beliefs, 1.8% Buddhist, 0.3% New Age, 0.4% Jewish, and 1.5% other religions. People who answered that they had no religion were 48.8%, and 5.5% of people did not answer the census question.

Of those at least 15 years old, 1,761 (49.2%) people had a bachelor's or higher degree, 1,335 (37.3%) had a post-high school certificate or diploma, and 489 (13.7%) people exclusively held high school qualifications. The median income was $63,900, compared with $41,500 nationally. 1,170 people (32.7%) earned over $100,000 compared to 12.1% nationally. The employment status of those at least 15 was that 1,857 (51.8%) people were employed full-time, 507 (14.2%) were part-time, and 69 (1.9%) were unemployed.

Individual statistical areas
Name	Area (km^{2})	Population	Density (per km^{2})	Dwellings	Median age	Median income
Kohimarama Bay	0.74	2,340	3,161	1,002	48.7 years	$60,900
Kohimarama Stadium	0.77	1,965	2,552	717	42.1 years	$68,000
New Zealand					38.1 years	$41,500

== History ==
Kohimarama was the original Māori name for Bastion Point which is now named Takaparawhau by owners Ngāti Whātua Ōrākei.

Kohimarama’s former name was Waipārera, ‘duck water’, as the area was a breeding ground of the pārera, the wild grey duck. This name was used by Māori and by Pākehā until 1870.

Kohimarama used to be part of the 600-acre Kohimarama block of land sold by the Māori Ngāti Pāoa iwi (tribe) to the Crown in May 1841 for 200 pounds. The block was a large area, from Ōrākei-Mission Bay to the Tāmaki River and from the Waitematā Harbour to the outskirts of Panmure. As the iwi never received the advantages they expected from the sale, the price is considered "ridiculously low, even for the time".

Arriving in Auckland in 1841, William Field Porter, was a month too late for the first Government auction, but became the first settler in today’s Kohimarama after the second auction. Then the area consisted of a lagoon, a raupo swamp and the Kohimarama beach, the longest beach in the harbour. Porter sent men to clear, fence and drain the area. One of these men was Thomas Kemp, later to be a landowner of the neighbouring suburb, Mission Bay.

The Kohimarama Wharf was built in 1912 on the Pipimea Head between Kohimarama and Mission Bay. The first business in Kohimarama was a tearoom which catered to the people arriving at the newly built wharf. The access to the wharf was not easy; people had to walk around the rocks to and from the wharf which ultimately led to the building of the road now known as Tamaki Drive.

From 1892 to 1919, Kohimarama was also known as the ‘Jockey Bay’, since the area was used as a training ground for race horses. In 1919, the stables were moved to Ronaki Road, Mission Bay, and the land in Kohimarama was leased to W.H. Madill, a dairy farmer.

Today, Kohimarama is one of the quieter beaches along Tamaki Drive and has cafes along the beach front. The Kohimarama Yacht Club is located on Tamaki Drive. This club was set up in 1939 for young people and the construction of the club house at Gower’s Point, between the Kohimarama and Saint Heliers, was finished in 1957.

In 2009 the Auckland City Council spent $10,000,000 to preserve the pōhutukawa trees by protecting the eroding sea wall. A boardwalk was created and sand was shipped from the northern beach of Pākiri. Naturalistic rock headlands were built and were the first of their kind along the Eastern Suburb beaches. They have become a part of the Tamaki Drive coastal landscape. The solution diverted storm water to either end of the beach and piped it out to a rock shelf. The rock headland formations were hand shaped and coloured to match the surrounding cliffs and recede into the existing environment.

== Nature areas ==
Kohimarama has several nature reserves: Madills Farm Recreation Reserve, Mary Atkin Reserve, Kohimarama Beach Reserve, Sage Road Reserve and Speight Road Reserve. Madills Farm Recreation Reserve used to be part of W.H. Madill's dairy farm in 1919. There are four playing fields on the northern half of the reserve. Mary Aitkin Reserve, named after an early missionary daughter, is a green open space where people can walk dogs. Kohimarama Beach Reserve is used for swimming. It is located east of the Kohimarama Yacht Club and boat races are held there. It has boat ramps, bicycle stands and toilets. Sage Road Reserve and Speight Road Reserve each function as an access way to Madills Farm Recreation Reserve.

== Education ==
Selwyn College is a secondary school (years 9–13) with a roll of 1,588.

Kohimarama School and St Thomas's School are full primary schools (years 1–8) with rolls of 476 and 786 students, respectively.

All these schools are co-educational. Rolls are as of July 2026.

== Sports ==
The football (soccer) club Eastern Suburbs AFC, which competes in the Lotto Sport Italia NRFL Division 1 and was crowned champion in 2011, is based in Kohimarama. Other sports clubs are the Kohimarama Tennis Club, the Kohimarama Yacht Club and Kohimarama Bowling Club which was formerly known as the Mission Bay Women's Bowling Club. The club changed its name in October 2013 after changing the rules about allowing men to join the club.

== Gallery ==
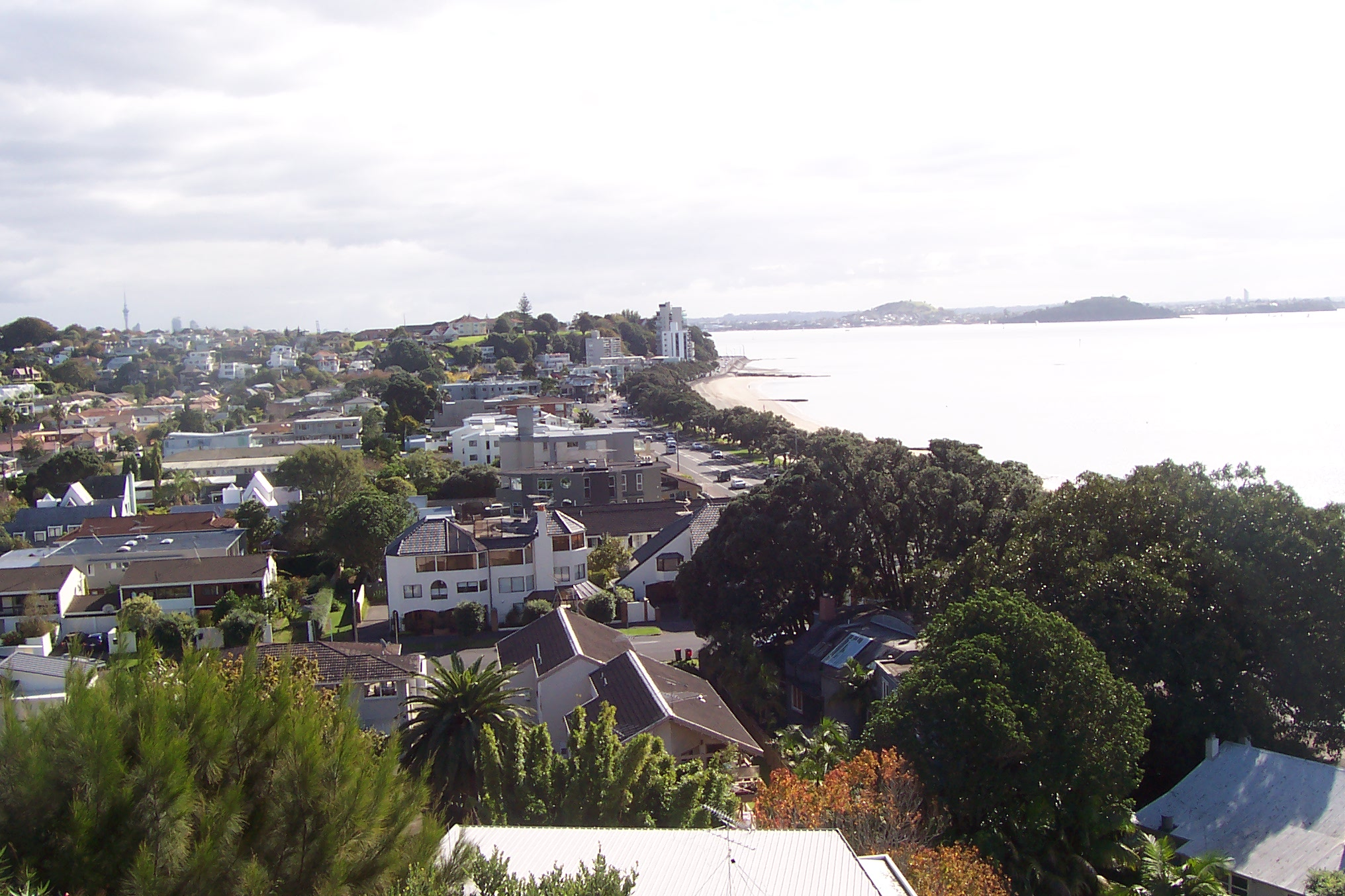
Kohimarama

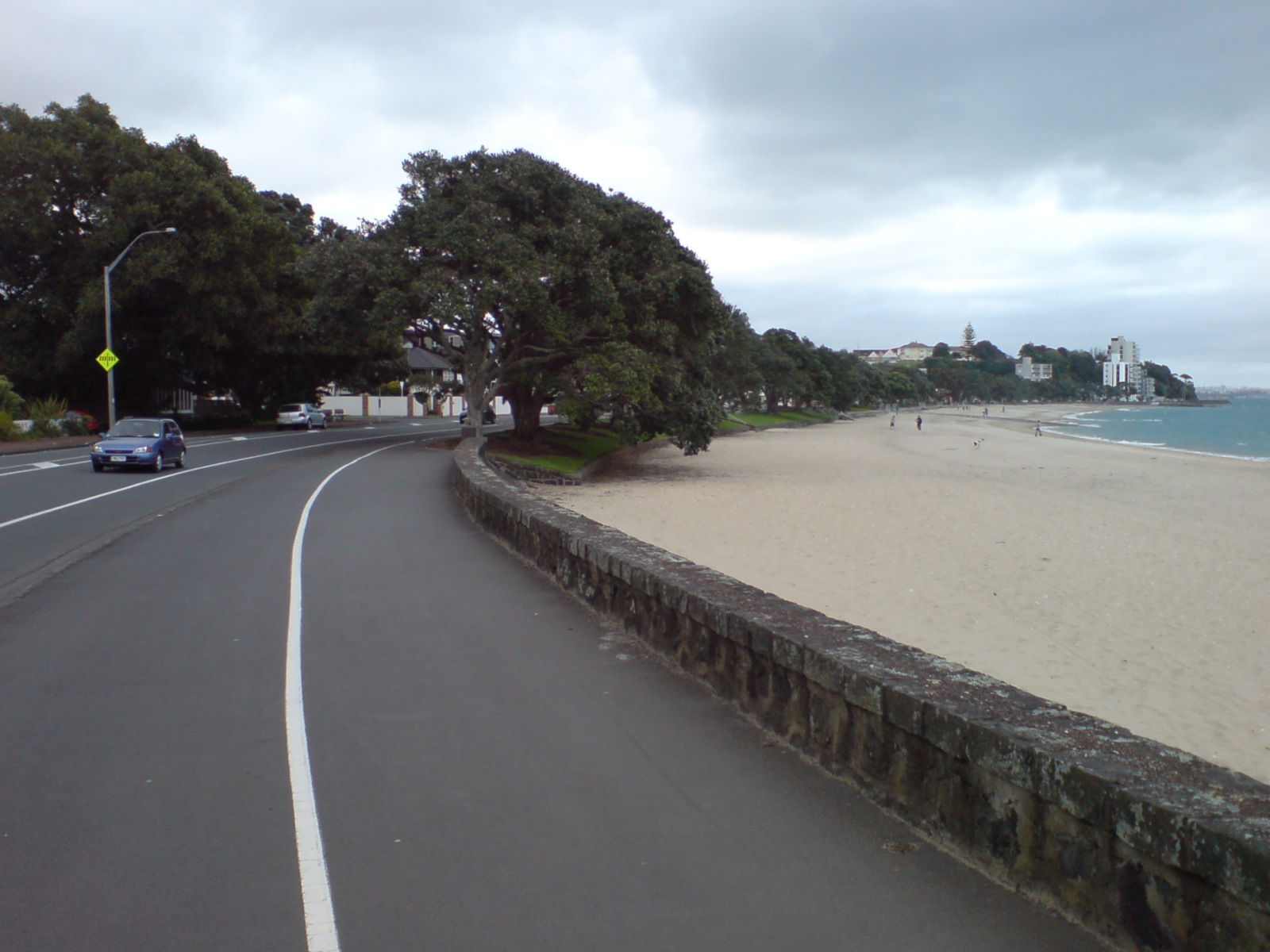
Kohimarama beach and Tamaki Drive

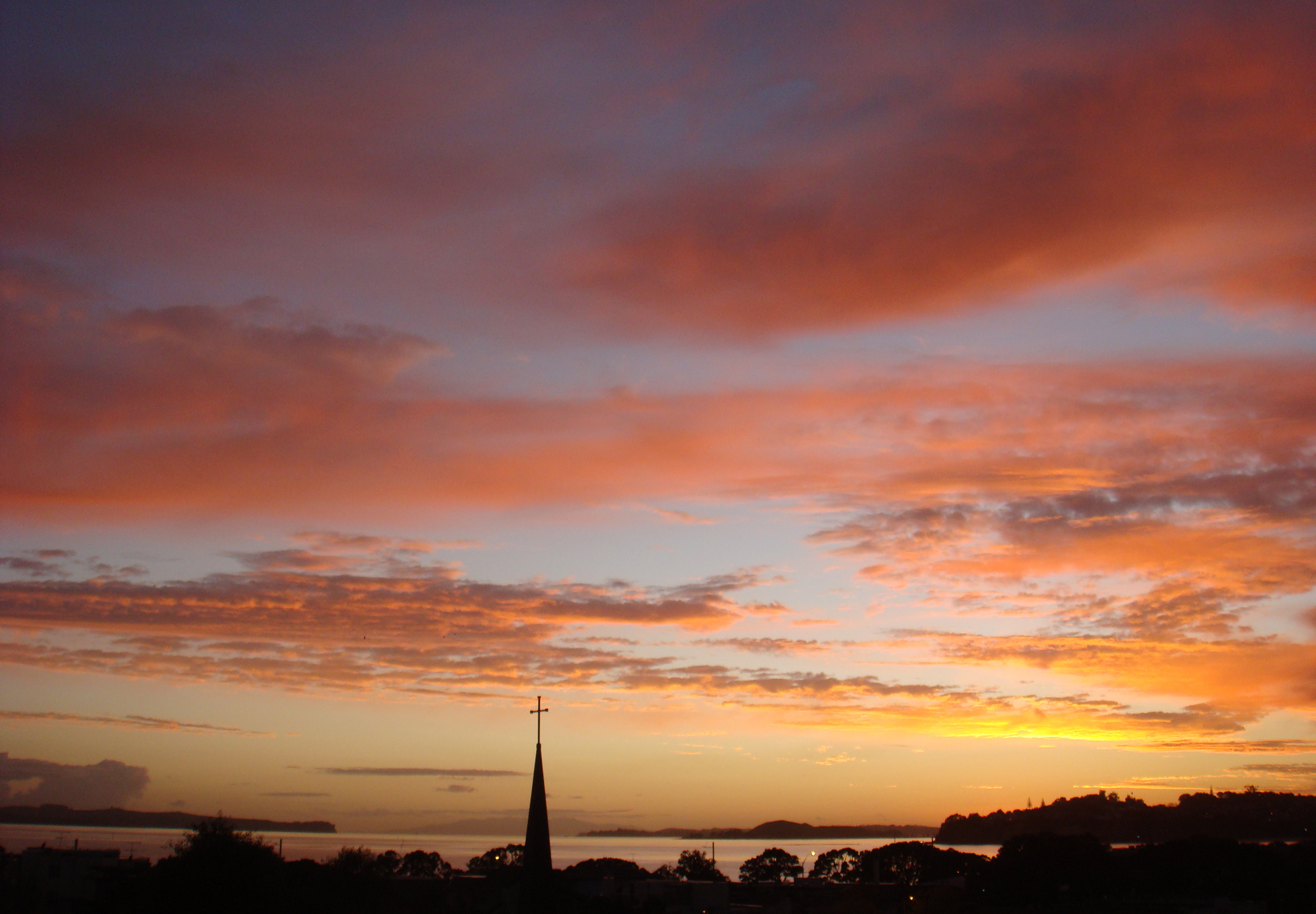
Sunrise on 1 May 2009

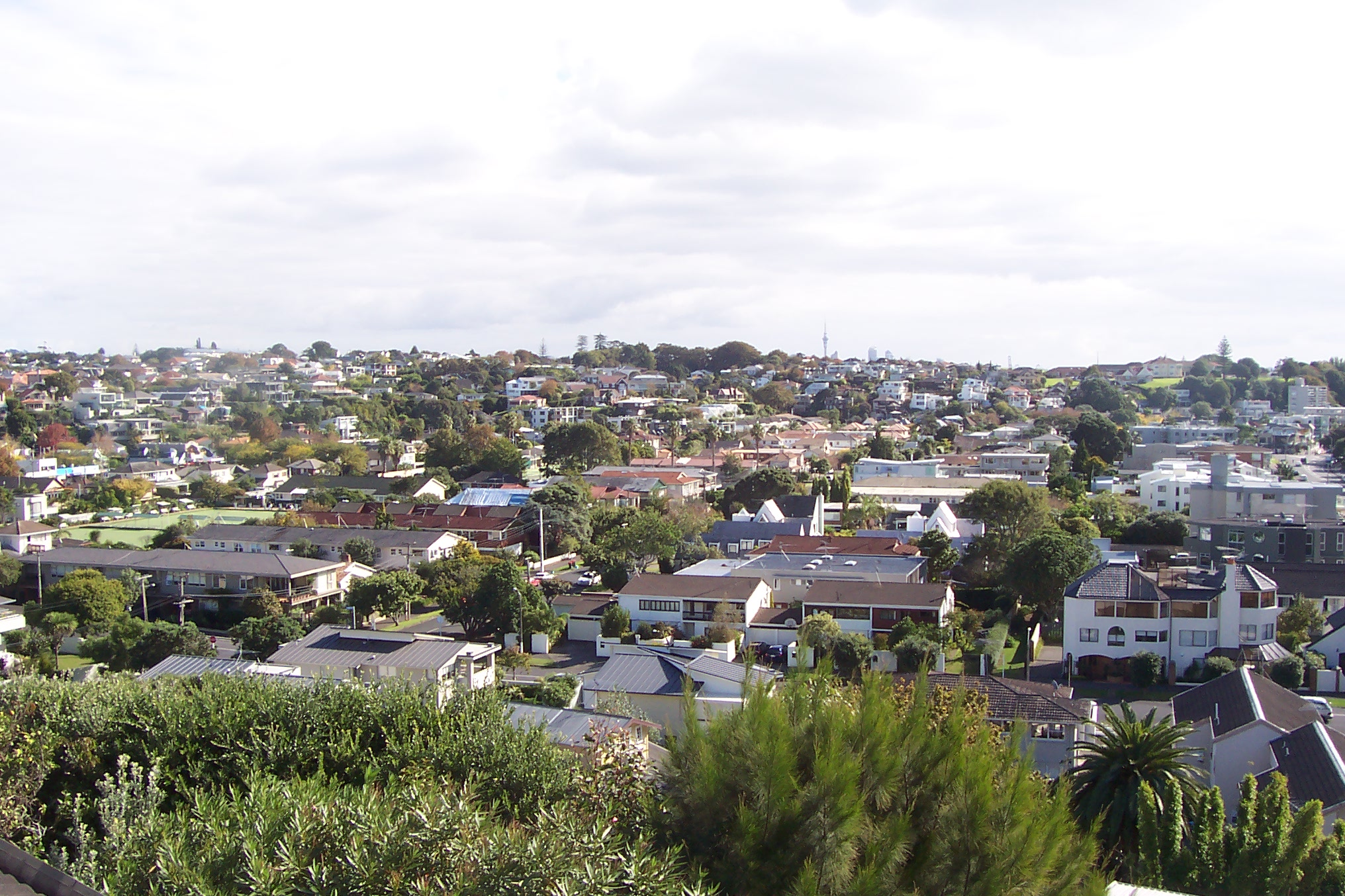
Kohimarama
