= Eastern Transport Corridor =

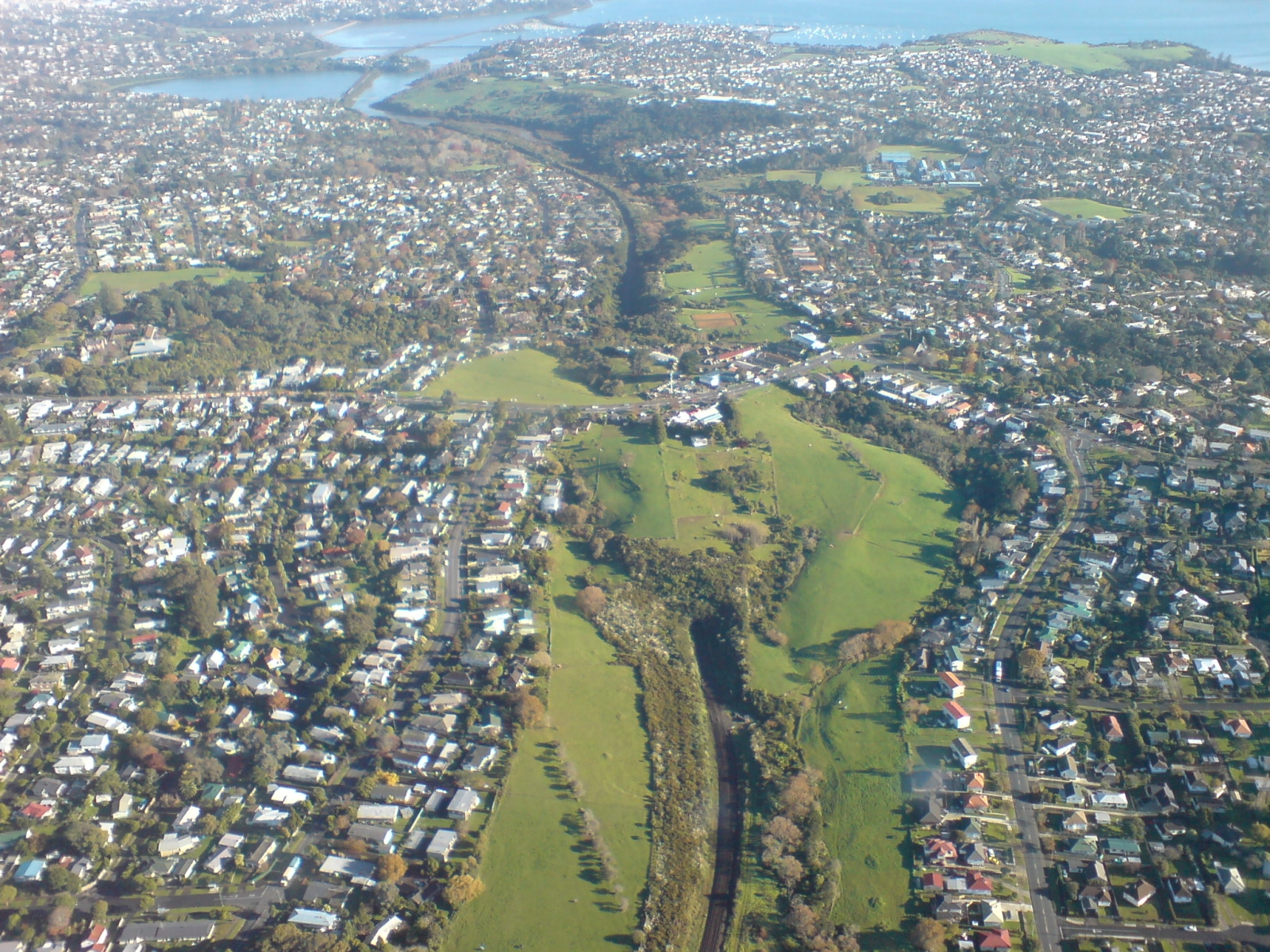
The Eastern Transport Corridor, from above Saint Johns.

The Eastern Transport Corridor. The green section is now Te Ara ki Uta ki Tai. The blue section is now Te Horeta Road. The red section will eventually become a 4-lane extension of Te Horeta Road

The Eastern Transport Corridor in Auckland, New Zealand, is a transport reserve along a strip of land and water some of which is occupied by housing, commerce, industry and local roads. It runs adjacent to the North Island Main Trunk freight and passenger railway line.

Historically, it was to provide the route for an additional motorway connecting through the isthmus from the east into the Auckland CBD, with an estimated cost of up to $4 billion, but political and local community resistance made the project fail in the 2000s. In 2022, Te Ara ki Uta ki Tai, a walking and cycling path between Glen Innes and Tamaki Drive, was built in this corridor; and the Eastern Busway is being built further south.

== Proposed motorway ==
=== Original designs ===
A strategy study in 2002 stated a need for a new motorway to be built in the corridor (as had been planned decades before) for a variety of reasons including the need to make suburban streets safer and less polluted. In March 2004, Auckland City Mayor John Banks proposed a motorway scheme through Hobson Bay. There was substantial community and political resistance to the scheme, largely due to the cost of the proposal (equivalent to four years of the entire country's transport funding budget) and the impact it would have on a number of established neighbourhoods, as well as areas like Tamaki Drive, the Parnell Baths and several environmentally sensitive areas. However, there were also groups that defended it, citing the projected economic gains, and the benefit it would have on the traffic volumes on Tamaki Drive. Banks proposed to underground large sections of the scheme (earning it the nickname 'tunnelway' amongst some commentators) and proposed to pay for the construction costs at least partly by selling Auckland City's 25% shareholding in Auckland International Airport, and by charging a $5 toll.

In 2002, Banks proposed that the Eastern Transport Corridor might link into a harbour tunnel starting north of Parnell, and linking to Ngataringa Bay near Devonport, for an estimated cost of $1 billion.

=== Revised designs ===
Many spoke out against the project, including former Auckland City Mayor Christine Fletcher, who argued that the proposed motorway barely featured in the statutory policy documents, that city councillors lacked the necessary information to make informed decisions, and that the intended growth areas of the city would not require the corridor, with a public transport route being preferable.

A revised plan published on 25 August 2004 reduced the number of lanes substantially (2-3 lanes + bus lane in each direction depending on the section), reducing the financial and ecological impact. Banks said he hoped the scheme would be acceptable to the opponents of the scheme, even though around 1,200 houses would still have to be demolished or otherwise affected. The Purewa Creek section was to be aligned on an elevated expressway to avoid damage to the environmentally sensitive area, while the motorway would be sunk into trenches in Glen Innes to reduce disruption. Depending on the connection to the CBD, the scheme would have either entered the city on a widened western Tamaki Drive section after crossing Hobson Bay, or gone through a tunnel under Parnell – which politicians promised would reduce much of the effects on Parnell residents.

However the impacts were still high, and the costs rising (with a worst case estimate of NZ$3.9 billion), and at that point the corridor was fast becoming a political boondoggle.

The proposed motorway was one of the principal points of contention in the 2004 local body elections and contributed to the defeat of Banks. It also led to the election of two candidates from the Action Hobson protest group who became councillors primarily on the promise to stop the new motorway.

The Auckland City Council transport and urban linkages committee decided on 10 December 2004 to scrap the planned motorway component in favour of improved public transport and increased capacity on existing local roads. However the transport reserve remains in place, allowing for the motorway to be undertaken at some point in the future if it becomes economically and politically feasible.

== Walking and cycling infrastructure ==
In 2022, Auckland Transport and Waka Kotahi built Te Ara Ki Uta Ki Tai (the path of land and sea) in this corridor.

== Alternative proposals ==
Based on this strong opposition to a major link through this area of eastern Auckland, the AMETI (Auckland-Manukau Eastern Transport Initiative) project was intended to improve the connections of this area towards the south-east (Manukau City), via less problematic routes. The new roads and public transport links were to serve intensified residential and mixed developments like the Mount Wellington Quarry area. In 2010, it was revealed that the updated AMETI plans now included much stronger bus priority proposals than before.

A significant part of AMETI emerged as the Eastern Busway project. Preliminary works for the busway began in 2018.

== Legal status ==
The designations for the Eastern Transport Corridor still exist as of 2020, and is currently held by Auckland Transport. Various proposals over the years (such as in 2006, initiated by Action Hobson) did not end in removal, partly because it was argued that the designations were needed for future proofing for the city's growth, and also because other transport links, such as another rail track, or busways, could be needed.
