= Ōrākei =

Suburb of Auckland

- Suburb
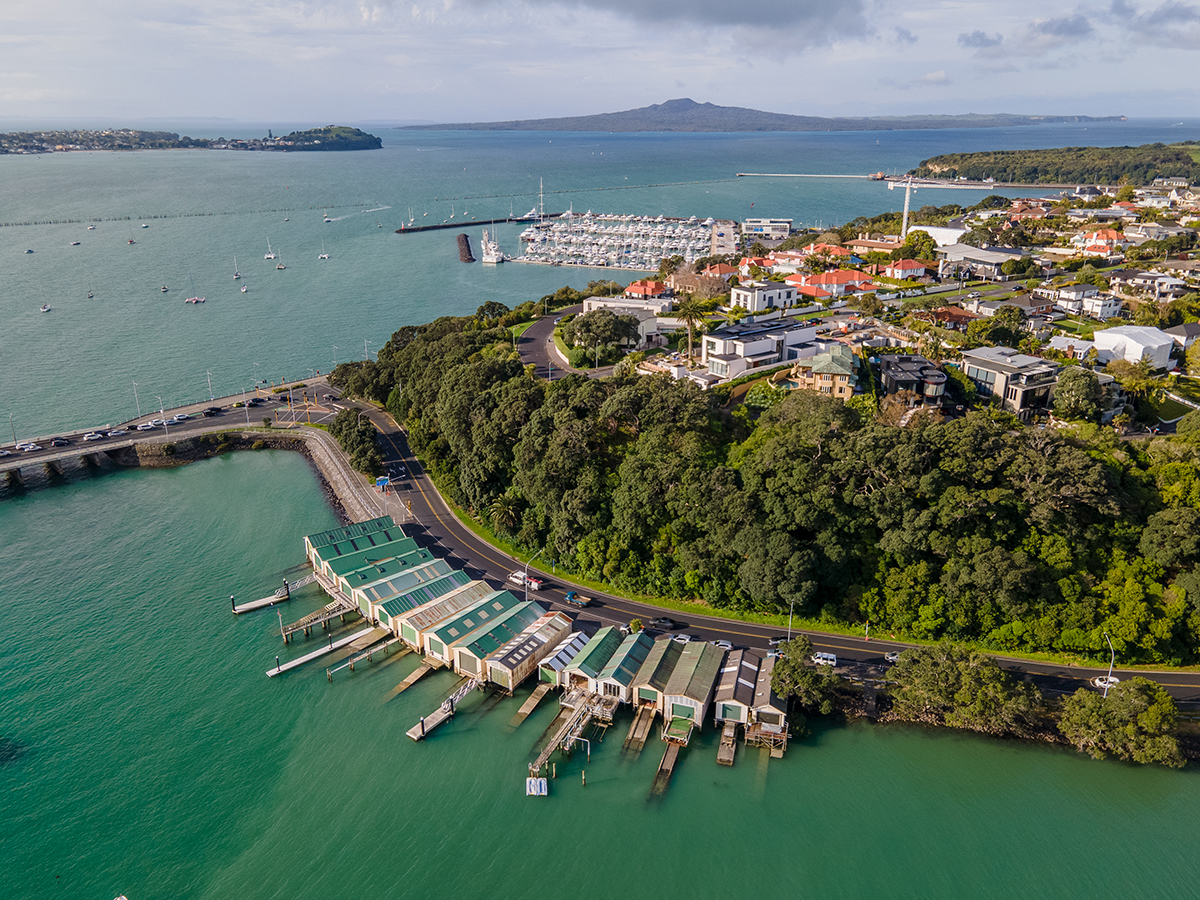
- View from Hobson Bay looking northeast over Ōrākei towards Rangitoto Island
- Interactive map of Ōrākei
- Coordinates: 36°51′11″S 174°48′41″E
- Country: New Zealand
- City: Auckland
- Local authority: Auckland Council
- Electoral ward: Ōrākei ward
- Local board: Ōrākei Local Board

Area
  - Land: 310 ha (770 acres)

Population (June 2025)
  - Total: 5,760
  - Density: 1,900/km^{2} (4,800/sq mi)
- Train stations: Ōrākei railway station

(Waitematā Harbour)	(Hauraki Gulf)	Mission Bay
Parnell	Ōrākei	Mission Bay
Remuera	Remuera	Kohimarama, Meadowbank

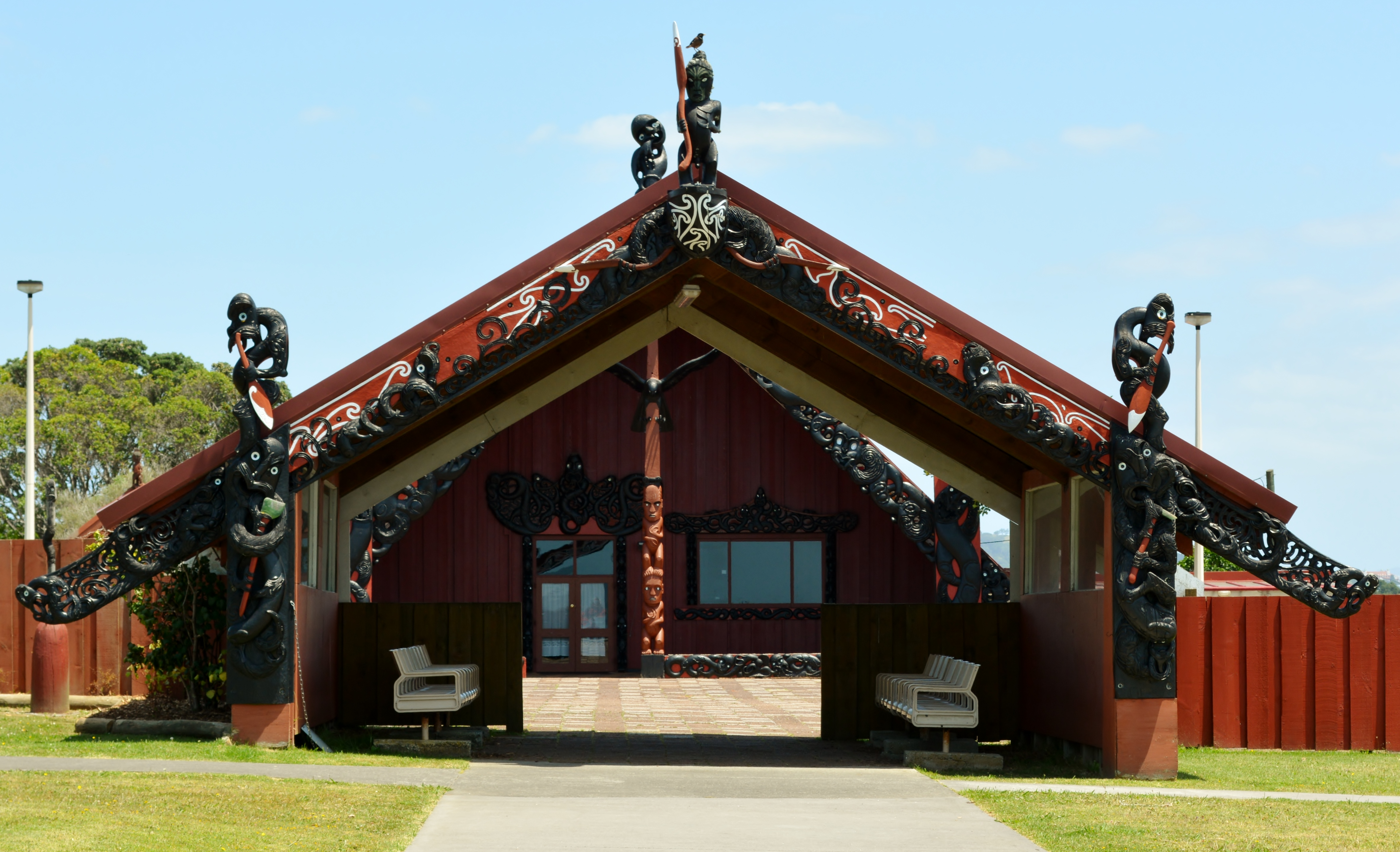
The entrance to Ōrākei Marae

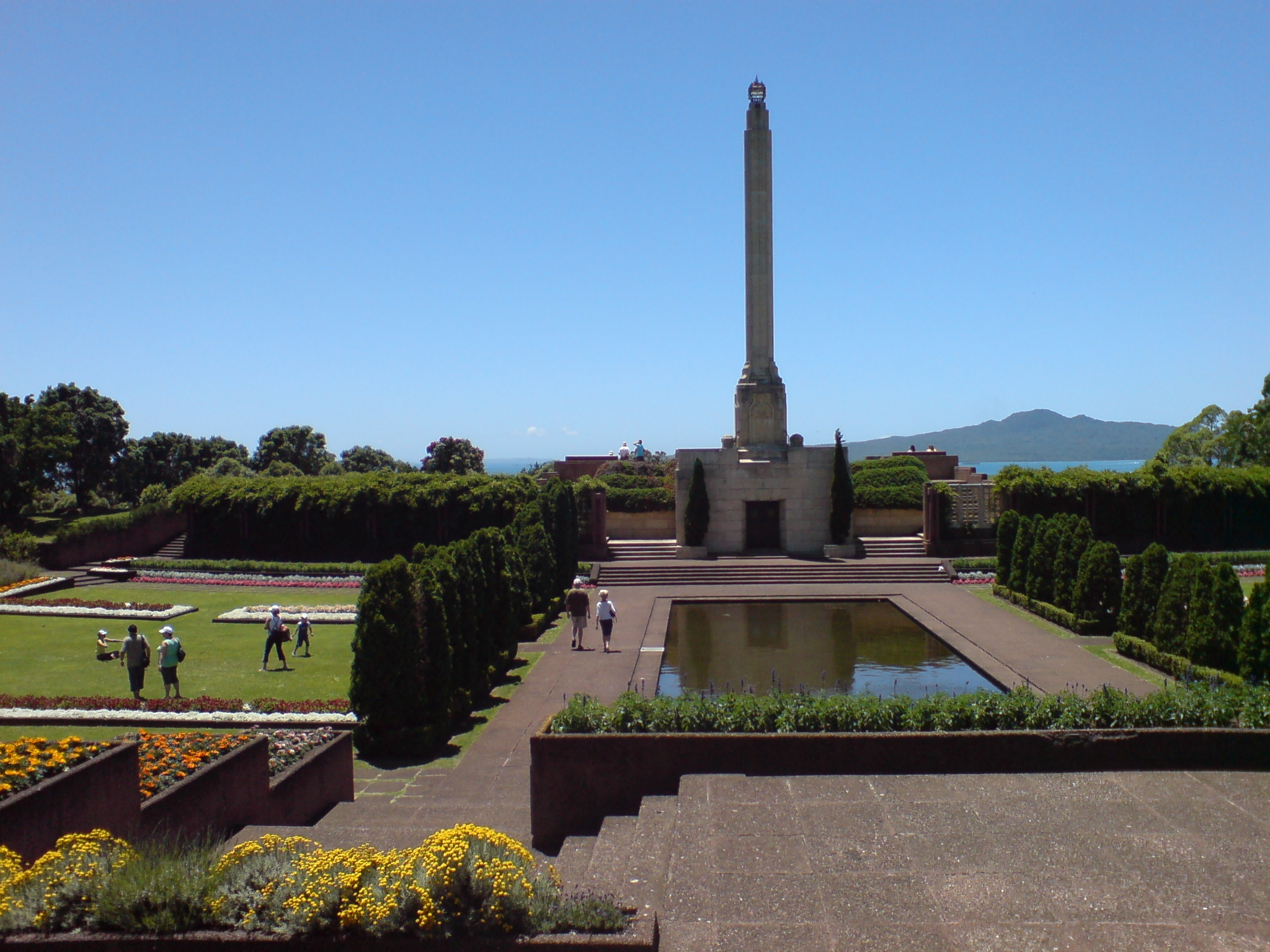
The Michael Joseph Savage Memorial

Ōrākei is a suburb of Auckland city, in the North Island of New Zealand. It is located on a peninsula five kilometres to the east of the city centre, on the shore of the Waitematā Harbour, which lies to the north, and Hobson Bay and Ōrākei Basin, two arms of the Waitematā, which lie to the west and south. To the east is the suburb of Mission Bay. Takaparawhau / Bastion Point is a coastal piece of land in Ōrākei. Between Takaparawhau and Paritai Drive is Ōkahu Bay and Reserve.

== Overview ==
The New Zealand Ministry for Culture and Heritage gives a translation of "place of adornment" for the Māori name of Ōrākei.

Takaparawhau / Bastion Point is the location of Ōrākei Marae and its Tumutumuwhenua wharenui (meeting house) is a traditional tribal meeting ground for the Ngāti Whātua iwi (tribe) and their Ngāti Whātua Ōrākei, Ngā Oho, Te Taoū and Te Uri hapū (sub-tribes). In the 1940s, the Ōrākei pā (village) was one of the last places where traditional pre-European kūmara cultivars (either hutihuti or rekamaroa) were grown.

Takaparawhau / Bastion Point is also the location of the Savage Memorial, the tomb and memorial garden for Michael Joseph Savage, the first Labour Party prime minister of New Zealand and one of the country's most popular prime ministers, who died in office in 1940. The Art Deco ensemble designed by Tibor Donner and Anthony Bartlett was officially opened in March 1943 and has expansive views of the Waitemata Harbour.

== History ==
The Orakei block was historically occupied by Ngāti Whātua Ōrākei, and before the colonisation of New Zealand it was part of important lands for the hapū, overlooking rich fishing and farming areas. The land was confiscated by the New Zealand Government for public works and development over a period stretching from the 1840s into the 1950s.

In 1900 the Orakei Road District was established from part of the Remuera Road District. The road board was responsible for local governance in Orakei until 1928 when it amalgamated with the City of Auckland.

Ōrākei was the first location where the New Zealand Flying School operated from between October and November 1915, before moving to Mission Bay, and a permanent location at Kohimarama in 1916.

In 1936-37 John A. Lee proposed to evict the 120 Māori living in the foreshore pā at Takaparawhau / Bastion Point and to include the land in the proposed Ōrākei state housing scheme; the proposal (seen as using Māori land as a park for white children) attracted many local objections (including Robin Hyde in No More Dancing at Orakei) and was reversed by Prime Minister Savage on his return from overseas. State houses were later constructed in 1937 in Ōrākei as a model for future state houses in Auckland.

In 1976 the Crown announced that it planned to develop Bastion Point by selling it to the highest bidder for high-income housing. Ngāti Whātua Ōrākei, and other activists, formed the Ōrākei Māori Action Committee, taking direct action to stop the subdivision. In 1977–1978 the Ōrākei Māori Action Committee organised an occupation of the remaining Crown land that lasted for 506 days. The occupation and the use of force to end it played a part in highlighting injustices against Māori, and the occupation became a major landmark in the history of Māori protest.

In 1988 the New Zealand Labour Government returned Takaparawhau / Bastion Point and Ōrākei Marae to Ngāti Whātua Ōrākei, with compensation, as part of a Treaty of Waitangi settlement process.

Under the 1991 Orakei Act, parts of Takaparawhau, including the marae, church, and now developed land, were reserved for Ngāti Whātua Ōrākei. The rest of Takaparawhau, Ōkahu Reserve and the foreshore land were set aside "as Maori reservation ... for the common use and benefit of the members of the hapu and the citizens of the City of Auckland". Collectively called the Whenua Rangatira (noble or chiefly land), these areas are administered by the Ngāti Whātua Ōrākei Reserves Board, equally represented by Ngāti Whātua Ōrākei and Auckland Council.

== Demographics ==
In 1901 the Orakei Road District had a population of 21, by 1926 this had climbed to 175.

Ōrākei covers 3.10 km^{2} (1.20 sq mi) and had an estimated population of 5,760 as of June 2025, with a population density of 1,858 people per km^{2}.

Historical population
Year	Pop.	±% p.a.
2006	5,352	—
2013	5,475	+0.33%
2018	5,625	+0.54%
2023	5,571	−0.19%

Ōrākei had a population of 5,571 in the 2023 New Zealand census, a decrease of 54 people (−1.0%) since the 2018 census, and an increase of 96 people (1.8%) since the 2013 census. There were 2,634 males, 2,928 females and 12 people of other genders in 2,157 dwellings. 3.6% of people identified as LGBTIQ+. The median age was 42.0 years (compared with 38.1 years nationally). There were 846 people (15.2%) aged under 15 years, 1,059 (19.0%) aged 15 to 29, 2,601 (46.7%) aged 30 to 64, and 1,065 (19.1%) aged 65 or older.

People could identify as more than one ethnicity. The results were 67.2% European (Pākehā); 19.5% Māori; 7.8% Pasifika; 17.0% Asian; 3.7% Middle Eastern, Latin American and African New Zealanders (MELAA); and 2.0% other, which includes people giving their ethnicity as "New Zealander". English was spoken by 95.2%, Māori language by 7.2%, Samoan by 1.0%, and other languages by 22.0%. No language could be spoken by 1.8% (e.g. too young to talk). New Zealand Sign Language was known by 0.5%. The percentage of people born overseas was 31.8, compared with 28.8% nationally.

Religious affiliations were 32.7% Christian, 1.1% Hindu, 2.4% Islam, 3.3% Māori religious beliefs, 1.1% Buddhist, 0.4% New Age, 0.8% Jewish, and 1.0% other religions. People who answered that they had no religion were 51.0%, and 6.5% of people did not answer the census question.

Of those at least 15 years old, 2,103 (44.5%) people had a bachelor's or higher degree, 1,788 (37.8%) had a post-high school certificate or diploma, and 837 (17.7%) people exclusively held high school qualifications. The median income was $55,400, compared with $41,500 nationally. 1,260 people (26.7%) earned over $100,000 compared to 12.1% nationally. The employment status of those at least 15 was that 2,436 (51.6%) people were employed full-time, 648 (13.7%) were part-time, and 141 (3.0%) were unemployed.

Individual statistical areas
Name	Area (km^{2})	Population	Density (per km^{2})	Dwellings	Median age	Median income
Orakei West	1.39	2,829	2,035	1,113	44.8 years	$61,000
Orakei East	1.71	2,742	1,604	1,044	39.8 years	$50,200
New Zealand					38.1 years	$41,500

== Education ==
Selwyn College is a secondary school (years 9–13) with a roll of 1378.

Ōrākei School is a full primary school (years 1–8) with a roll of 242.

St Joseph's School is a state-integrated Catholic full primary school (years 1–8) with a roll of 22.

All these schools are co-educational. Rolls are as of July 2026.

== See also ==
- Ngāti Whātua Ōrākei
- Takaparawhau / Bastion Point
- Ōrākei railway station
