= Ngāti Whātua Ōrākei =

Māori hapū in New Zealand

Ngāti Whātua-o-Ōrākei
- Iwi (tribe) in Māoridom
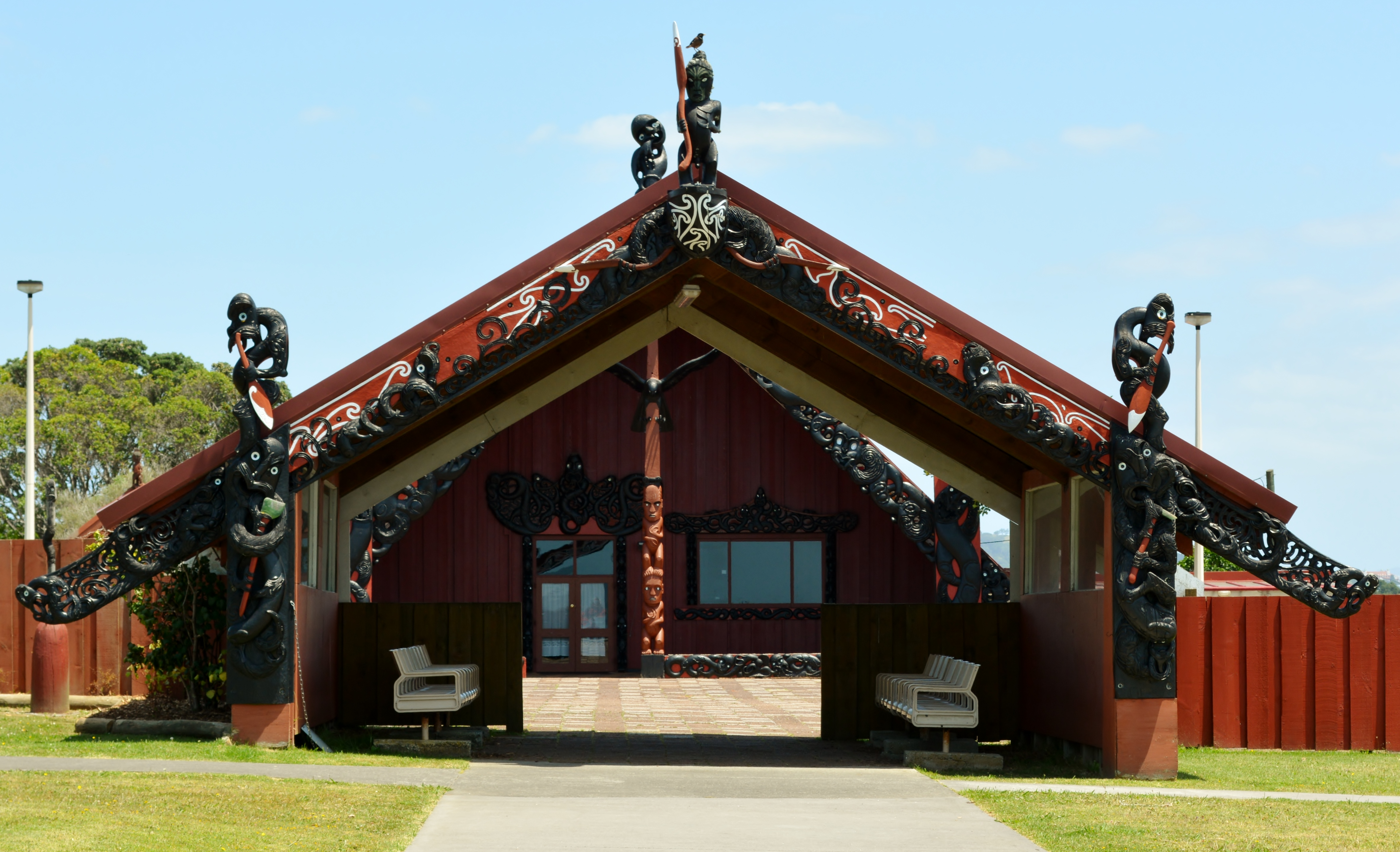
- The entrance to Ōrākei Marae, the cultural hub for Ngāti Whātua Ōrākei.

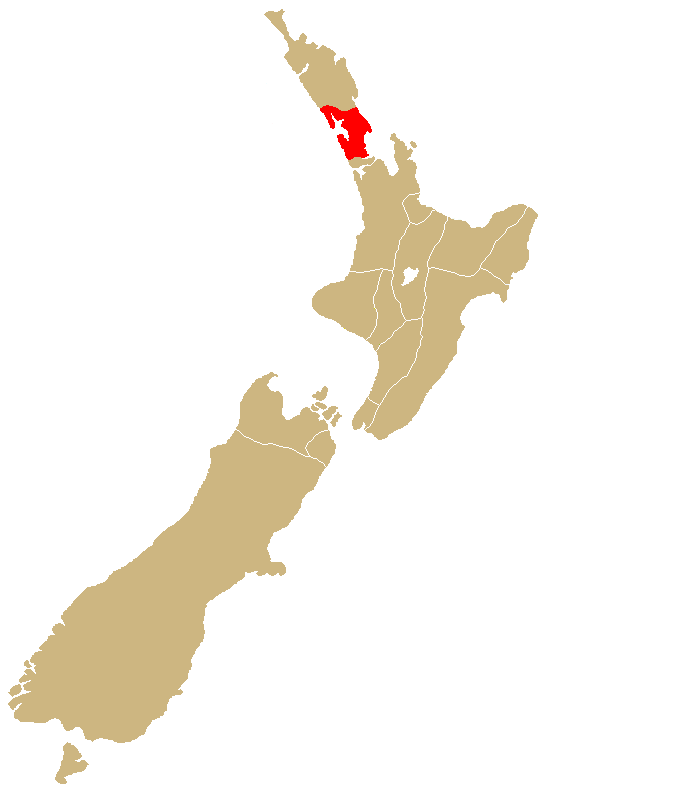
- Rohe (region): Auckland
- Waka (canoe): Māhuhu-ki-te-rangi
- Website: www.ngatiwhatuaorakei.com

Ngāti Whātua Ōrākei or Ngāti Whātua-o-Ōrākei is an Auckland-based Māori hapū (sub-tribe) in New Zealand. Together with Te Uri-o-Hau, Te Roroa and Te Taoū, it comprises the iwi (tribe) of Ngāti Whātua. These four hapū can act together or separately as independent tribes. The hapū's rohe (tribal area) is mostly in Tāmaki Makaurau, the site of present-day Auckland. Ngāti Whātua Ōrākei has around 6,000 members whose collective affairs are managed by the Ngāti Whātua Ōrākei Trust.

== History ==
Ngāti Whātua descends from the ancestor Tuputupuwhenua (also known as Tumutumuwhenua). The iwi traces its arrival in New Zealand to the Māhuhu-ki-te-rangi canoe, which landed north of the Kaipara Harbour. They also descend from ancestors who migrated from Muriwhenua in the Far North and intermarried with the tribes in Ngāti Whātua's territory.

Ngāti Whātua originally occupied the area between the Hokianga and Kaipara harbours. They later pushed south and came to control the area around the Kaipara Harbour. This led to tension with Te Wai-o-Hua, led by Kiwi Tāmaki, who were the main tribe in Auckland. Kiwi Tāmaki attacked Ngāti Whātua and ensuing conflict led to a battle near Laingholm in about 1741, where Ngāti Whātua chief Waha-akiaki killed Kiwi Tāmaki. In subsequent battles, Waha-akiaki and his cousin Tūperiri conquered all of central Auckland. Waha-akiaki returned to the Kaipara, leaving a section of Ngāti Whātua under Tūperiri who settled in Auckland. Tūperiri arranged peace marriages between his sons Tomoaure and Tarahawaiiki to important Waiohua women, Tahuri and Mokorua. The descendants of these marriages became known by the hapū name Ngāti Whātua Ōrākei.

During the early to mid-19th century Tūperiri's grandson Te Kawau (later baptised Apihai) became the leader of the hapū. On 20 March 1840 in the Manukau Harbour area where Ngāti Whātua farmed, now paramount chief Apihai Te Kawau signed Te Tiriti o Waitangi (the te reo Māori translation of the Treaty of Waitangi). Ngāti Whātua sought British protection from Ngāpuhi as well as a reciprocal relationship with the Crown and the Church. Soon after signing Te Tiriti, Ngāti Whātua Ōrākei, the primary hapū and landowner in Tāmaki Makaurau, made a strategic gift of 3,500 acres (1,400 hectares) of land on the Waitematā Harbour to Hobson, the new Governor of New Zealand, for the new capital.

By 1855, Ngāti Whātua Ōrākei, who had given two further land gifts of 13,200 acres (5,342 hectares) to the Crown, had lost most of their remaining land through speculators. The 700-acre Orakei Block was all that remained. Within a century, this too was compulsorily acquired by the Crown (apart from a cemetery).

== Takaparawhau / Bastion Point ==
In the 1970s Ngāti Whātua Ōrākei played a leading role in a dispute over vacant land at Takaparawhau / Bastion Point, east of the Auckland city centre, adjoining the suburb of Ōrākei. The land, which the New Zealand government had acquired cheaply for public works many decades before, largely reverted to the hāpu after a long occupation and passive resistance. In 1988 the New Zealand Government returned Takaparawhau / Bastion Point and Ōrākei Marae to Ngāti Whātua Ōrākei, with compensation, as part of a Treaty of Waitangi settlement process. The 1991 Ōrākei Act was passed to recognise the rights of Ngāti Whātua Ōrākei under the Treaty. In 2011 the hapū signed a Deed of Settlement with the Crown.

== Māhuhu-ki-te-rangi ==
As part of the 1990 Commemorations Ngāti Whātua Ōrākei made a large waka with the same name as the historical Māhuhu-ki-te-rangi or Māhuhu-ki-te-rangi waka. It led the 150th Auckland Anniversary celebrations in 1990 and the new millennium celebrations in 2000, both on the Waitematā Harbour.

== Memorial ==
In 2018 Ngāti Whātua Ōrākei and the Ports of Auckland created a memorial to Te Kawau for his gifting of land to Governor Hobson and commemorating his contributions to Auckland, while marking the place where the city was founded on 18 September 1840.
