= Leo Walsh =

Leo Walsh may refer to:

- Leo Austin Walsh (1881–1951), with his brother Vivian Walsh, pioneers of New Zealand aviation
- Leo Walsh (footballer) (1900–1981), Australian rules footballer
