= Walsh Brothers Flying Boats =

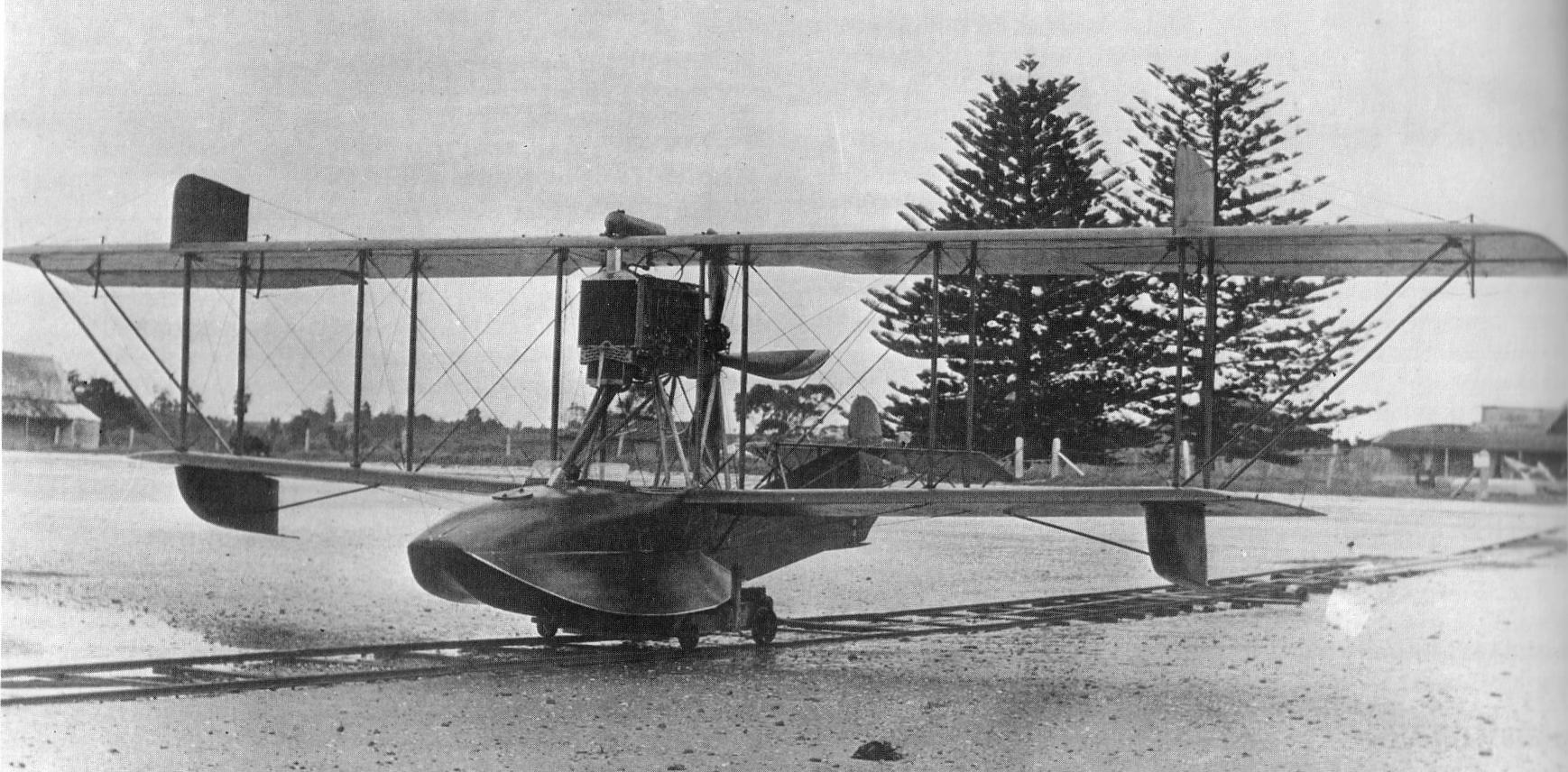
- Walsh Brothers type D flying boat

General information
- Type: Flying boats
- National origin: New Zealand
- Manufacturer: Walsh Brothers

The Walsh Brothers Flying Boats were aircraft that were used during World War I to provide training to pilots in New Zealand prior to their enlistment into the Royal Flying Corps.

== Walsh brothers ==
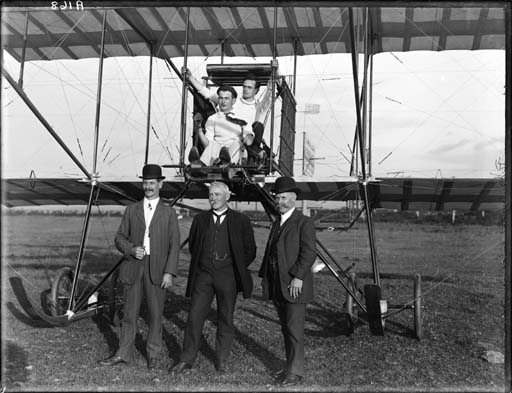
Financial backers and Leo and Vivian Walsh alongside the Manurewa No. 1 in 1911

Brothers Leo and Vivian Walsh built a Howard Wright biplane in 1910, named the Manurewa, and first successfully flew it in February 1911 at Glenora Park (modern-day Takanini). In August 1911, the aircraft crashed but it was later rebuilt by the brothers and converted into an entirely new aircraft, with a streamlined nacelle positioned between the wings, which had a swept outer bay, while the canard was replaced by a conventional tailplane.

== The New Zealand Flying School ==
During 1914 the Walsh brothers constructed a two-seat flying boat similar to a Curtiss design. The war broke out in August 1914, and the Curtiss-based design was modified with dual controls to become a trainer and first flown on 1 January 1915. By 14 March 1915, the sea planes had begun to fly their first passengers. In mid-1915, the brothers founded the New Zealand Flying School to train men for the Royal Flying Corps. The first class of three included the fighter ace, Keith Caldwell. Classes were always small but, in contrast to overseas training, comprehensive. The school began operating out of a shed in Ōrākei in October 1915, and by 28 November had moved to Mission Bay. By 1916, the school operated from their permanent location at Kohimarama. The flying school closed in September 1924, after training over 1,000 pilots.

== Evolution of the Curtiss design ==
Due to the difficulties in obtaining suitable training aircraft, the Walsh brothers decided to build their own trainers, initially based on the Curtiss pattern. Over the next four years they produced a series of four flying boat designs, evolved from, but bearing little resemblance to, the original Curtiss model. The last of the Walsh Brothers designs, the Type D of 1919, was an aerodynamically and hydrodynamically advanced machine, with a powerful Beardmore engine.

== Sale to NZPAF ==
The flying school struggled to gain clients after the war, and all assets of the flying school were acquired for the New Zealand Permanent Air Force (NZPAF) in 1924. All Walsh brothers flying boats had been made for the use of the school, not for sale, and were transferred to the NZPAF; however, the NZPAF had a landplane training programme based upon the Avro 504K and had no use for the flying boats. The survivors are believed to have been burnt on the Auckland waterfront, however there are "lost treasure" stories that these and some of the other machines used by the flying school are stored on a defence force base at Devonport in tunnels bricked up after the Second World War.
