= Ngapipi Reweti =

Ngāpipi Rēweti (1883–1957) was a land negotiator of the New Zealand Māori iwi (tribe) of Ngāti Whātua. He was born in Okahu Bay, Auckland, New Zealand in about 1883.
