= George Bolt =

New Zealand aviator

George Bruce Bolt OBE
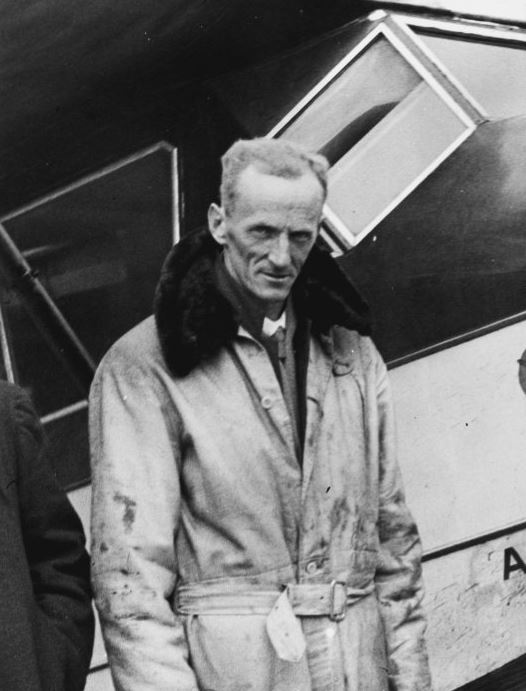
- George Bolt, 1943
- Born: 24 May 1893; Dunedin
- Died: 27 July 1963 (aged 70); Auckland, New Zealand
- Burial place: Purewa Cemetery, Meadowbank, Auckland
- Awards: Officer of the Civil Division of the Most Excellent Order of the British Empire

George Bruce Bolt OBE (24 May 1893 – 27 July 1963) was a pioneering New Zealand aviator.

== Biography ==
Bolt was born in Dunedin in 1893. He formed the Canterbury Aero Club in 1910, helping to make and fly gliders on the Cashmere Hills. He used these to take aerial photographs in 1912.

In 1916 Bolt was hired by pioneer pilot Vivian Walsh as a mechanic at the Walsh Brothers Flying School at Kohimarama. He learnt to fly the brothers' Curtiss flying boats and the machines of their own design, including the Walsh brothers Type D, as well as the two Boeing and Westervelt floatplanes which were the first machines made by that company.

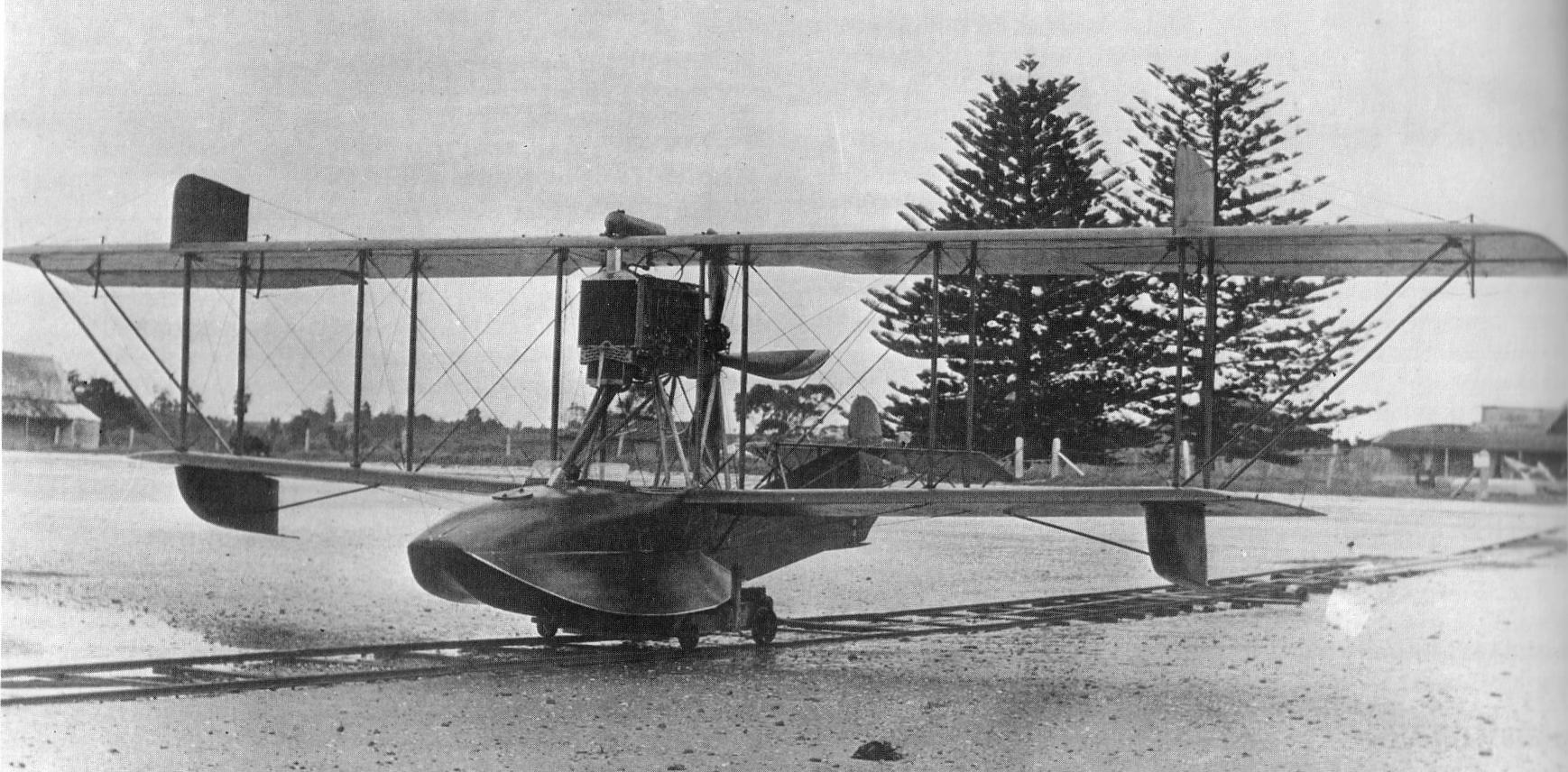
Walsh Brothers type D flying boat

In 1919 he flew New Zealand's first air mail and established an altitude record of 6,500 feet (2,000 m). In 1921 he flew from Auckland to Wellington in 5 hours and 16 minutes with stops at Kawhia and Wanganui with Leo Walsh as passenger.

He was a Royal New Zealand Air Force (RNZAF) and Royal Air Force (RAF) pilot during World War II, and Chief Engineer of Tasman Empire Airways Limited (TEAL), now known as Air New Zealand, from 1944 to 1960, where his experience with the Short Sandringham led him to play a role in the development of the Short Solent.

Several streets and aviation related facilities in various New Zealand cities are named after him, including George Bolt Memorial Drive, the main access road to Auckland International Airport.

Bolt performed initial research into the achievements of aviation pioneer and inventor Richard Pearse during the late 1950s and early 1960s.

In the 1953 Coronation Honours, Bolt was appointed an Officer of the Order of the British Empire, for services to aviation. His son Richard Bolt also served in the RNZAF and rose to the rank of air marshal.

Bolt died in Auckland in 1963. He was buried at Purewa Cemetery in the Auckland suburb of Meadowbank.
