= Mission Bay, New Zealand =

Mission Bay
- Suburb
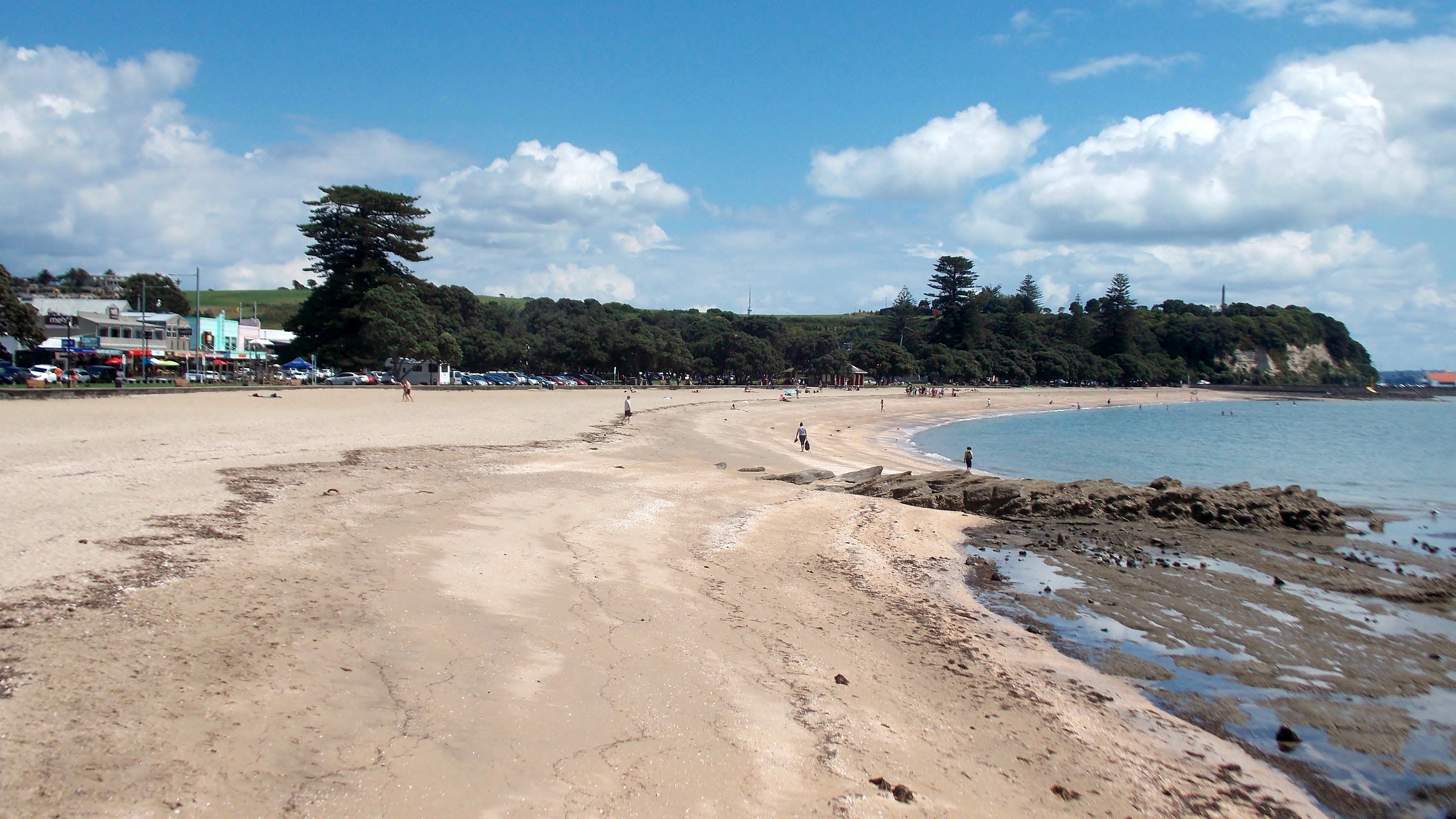
- View of Mission Bay Beach
- Interactive map of Mission Bay
- Coordinates: 36.84817°S 174.83059°E
- Country: New Zealand
- City: Auckland
- Local authority: Auckland Council
- Electoral ward: Ōrākei ward
- Local board: Ōrākei Local Board

Area
  - Land: 154 ha (380 acres)

Population (June 2025)
  - Total: 4,540
  - Density: 2,950/km^{2} (7,640/sq mi)

Waitematā Harbour, Devonport	Hauraki Gulf	Rangitoto Island
Okahu Bay	Mission Bay	Kohimarama, Saint Heliers, Glendowie
Ōrākei	Meadowbank	Kohimarama, St Johns

Mission Bay is a seaside suburb of Auckland city, on the North Island of New Zealand. The suburb's beach is a popular resort, located alongside Tamaki Drive. The area also has a wide range of eateries. Mission Bay is located seven kilometres to the east of the city centre, and east of the Waitematā Harbour, between Ōrākei and Kohimarama. It covers an area of 1.08 km2 (267 acres), about three quarters of which comprises low hills, surrounding the remaining quarter, which slopes down to the sea. Local government of Mission Bay is the responsibility of the Ōrākei Local Board, which also includes the suburbs of Ōrākei, Kohimarama, St Heliers, Glendowie, St Johns, Meadowbank, Remuera and Ellerslie.

== History ==
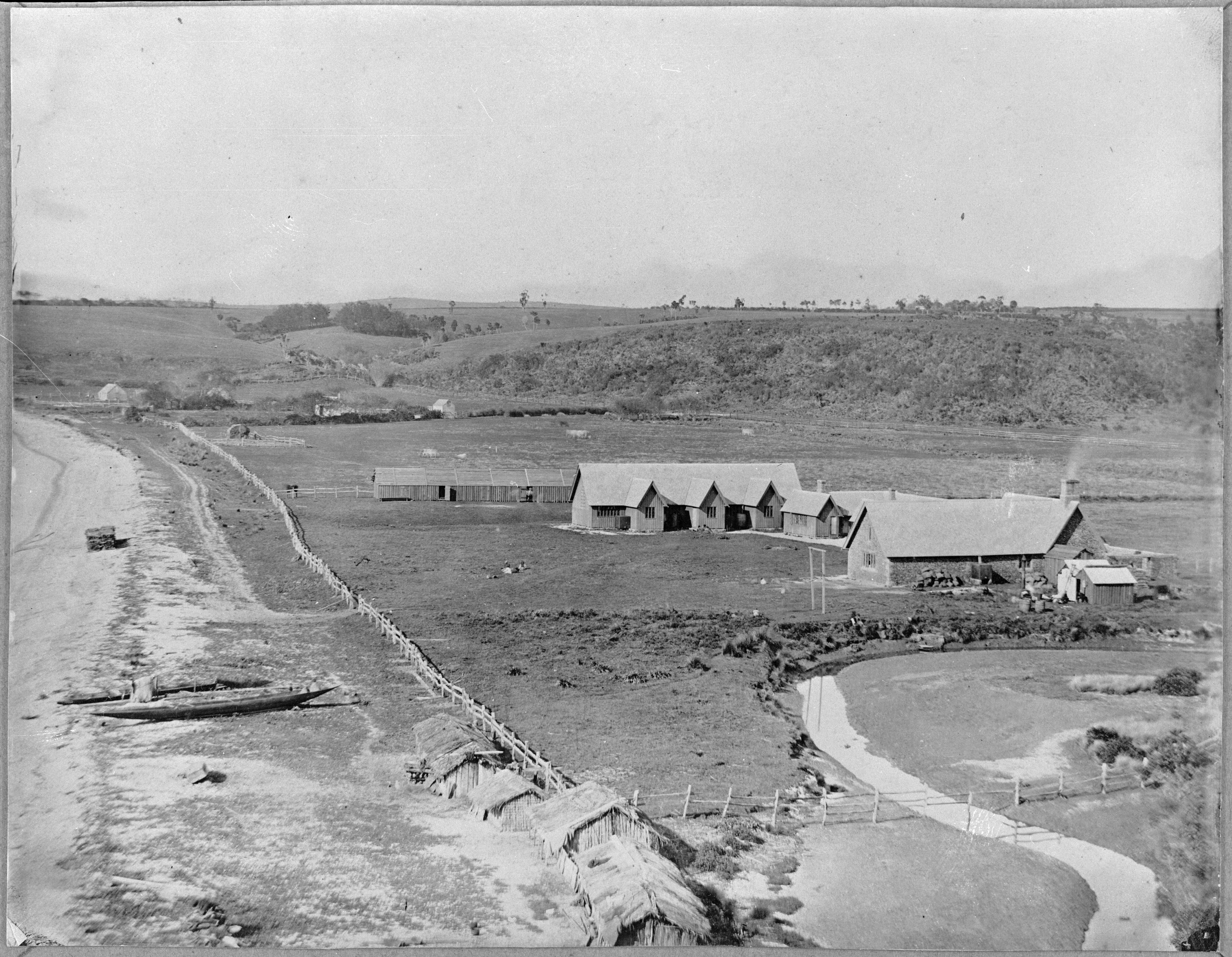
Mission Bay circa 1860

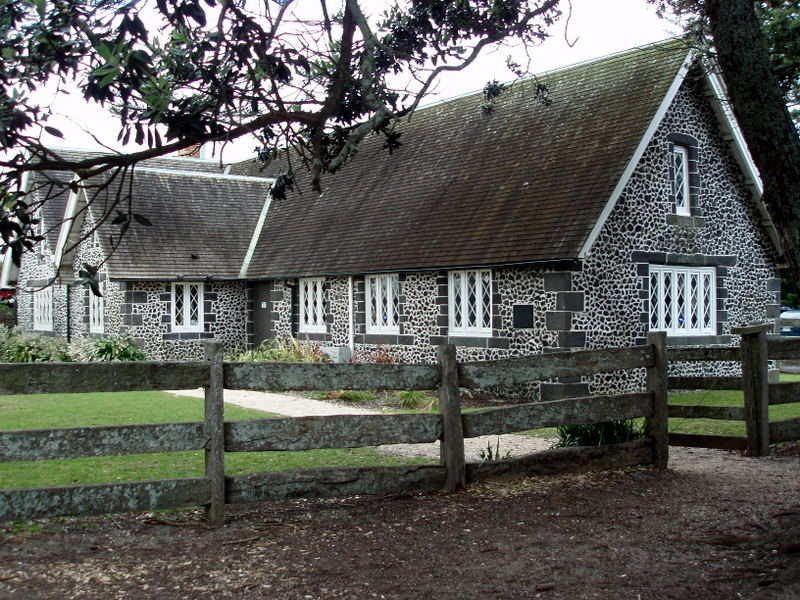
Mission buildings at Selwyn Reserve

Mission Bay sits on three parcels of land comprising part of the Kohimarama block bought from the Crown in the early 1840s. The area used to be referred to as ‘Kohimarama’, a name now given to a neighbouring suburb Kohimarama. Present-day Mission Bay takes its name from the Melanesian Mission, which was established by the Anglican Bishop George Augustus Selwyn at the bay at the end of the 1840s. The school also known as St Andrew's College, was an Anglican institution set up to provide Melanesian boys with a Christian education. The stone buildings, designed by Reader Wood, date from 1858 and are built of scoria rock quarried on the volcanic island of Rangitoto.

In the winter of 1860 the mission buildings were lent to the Governor, Colonel Thomas Gore Browne, who organised the historic Kohimarama Conference. The conference was attended by 200 rangatira from a large number of iwi throughout New Zealand and aimed at convincing Māori leaders to reject the Māori King Movement and justify the Government’s war in Taranaki, which had broken out over a disputed land transaction. The conference lasted a month. A wide range of issues were discussed. It gave southern Māori in particular an opportunity to gain a fuller understanding of the meaning of the treaty. In the last week Paora Tuarere (Ngati Whatua) proposed that the treaty should be endorsed by the conference as a "fuller ratification". Tuarere was one of the principal chiefs who gave and sold land to the government in Auckland on the Auckland isthmus. Māori then affirmed the treaty thus reassuring the government that Māori would, in general, support the government rather than the new Māori king. The kingite Wiremu Tamahana attended the conference. The Kohimarama Conference is said to be unique, since it was the first time Māori had been given the opportunity to hold a rūnanga with Pākehā officials, which was a first step towards representation in the Government of New Zealand.

The Anglican Mission was transferred to Norfolk Island in 1867, but St. Andrews College remained an educational institution, serving as a naval training school, industrial school, and institute for teaching work practices to ‘neglected’ boys.

Mission Bay, was the second location for the Walsh Brothers New Zealand Flying School after moving from Ōrākei in November 1915. For many years they used the bay as a landing area for their seaplanes. It is claimed that during this time they trained at least a third of the New Zealand’s pilots active during the First World War. Hence, Mission Bay was also known as ‘Flying School Bay’. The school closed in 1924, after training over 1,000 pilots.

In 1928, the mission building became a museum, but was found to be unsuitable for the display of artefacts. It was taken over as a heritage property by Heritage New Zealand in 1974 and the former St. Andrews College has since been leased out as a restaurant.

In 1919, the area started to be sub-divided with another subdivision of the lands held by the Melanesian Mission Trust occurring in 1925.

== Economy ==
=== Retail ===
The waterfront Mission Bay Shopping Precinct has about 44 retailers, including a four-screen Reading Cinema, with on-street parking.

Eastridge Shopping Centre, located on the upper side of the Mission Bay suburb, has 32 stores including a New World supermarket.

== Landmarks and features ==
=== Trevor Moss Davis Memorial Fountain ===
This fountain is the centre piece of the Mission Bay Reserve. Trevor Moss Davis was director of the Auckland liquor firm Hancock and Company and died of a sudden heart attack in 1947 at the age of 45. His father Eliot Davis, nephew of Sir Ernest Davis, Auckland mayor from 1935 to 1945, gifted a memorial fountain at Mission Bay to keep the memory of his son alive. The fountain was designed by architect George Tole and created by Richard Gross, it is constructed of Sicilian marble fluted to catch the light and decorated with three bronze sea monsters gushing water. The memorial is a landmark on the city’s waterfront, regularly sending dancing jets of water as high as 12 m (40 ft) in the air and at night it features a beautiful light show. During the summer young children use it as a paddling pool.

=== Parks ===
Selwyn Reserve - This is the open green space between Tamaki Drive and Mission Bay Beach, often referred to as Mission Bay Reserve. It is named after the first Anglican bishop of New Zealand, George Augustus Selwyn. The reserve and beach together are one of Auckland city’s most popular waterfront locations. During the summer months the reserve hosts music, arts and sports events.

Kepa Bush Reserve - In addition to Mission Bay’s prominence as a beach resort, the suburb is home to the Kepa Bush Reserve, situated on the banks of Purewa Creek, which flows past Ōrākei Basin into Hobson Bay. The reserve is a pocket of native bush bustling with bird life during the day and serene with glow-worms in the gully near the main entrance at night. The reserve honours the memory of Te Keepa Te Rangihiwinui, a Māori military commander and ally of the government forces during the New Zealand Wars. He is also known as Te Keepa, Major Keepa or Major Kemp. During the land wars of the 1860s he fought for government forces against Te Kooti and Tītokowaru.

== Demographics ==
Mission Bay covers 1.54 km^{2} (0.59 sq mi) and had an estimated population of 4,540 as of June 2025, with a population density of 2,948 people per km^{2}.

Historical population
Year	Pop.	±% p.a.
2006	4,134	—
2013	4,191	+0.20%
2018	4,341	+0.71%
2023	4,329	−0.06%

Mission Bay had a population of 4,329 in the 2023 New Zealand census, a decrease of 12 people (−0.3%) since the 2018 census, and an increase of 138 people (3.3%) since the 2013 census. There were 2,019 males, 2,292 females and 15 people of other genders in 1,800 dwellings. 3.5% of people identified as LGBTIQ+. The median age was 43.6 years (compared with 38.1 years nationally). There were 630 people (14.6%) aged under 15 years, 741 (17.1%) aged 15 to 29, 2,046 (47.3%) aged 30 to 64, and 912 (21.1%) aged 65 or older.

People could identify as more than one ethnicity. The results were 75.8% European (Pākehā); 5.5% Māori; 2.6% Pasifika; 20.0% Asian; 4.2% Middle Eastern, Latin American and African New Zealanders (MELAA); and 1.9% other, which includes people giving their ethnicity as "New Zealander". English was spoken by 96.1%, Māori language by 1.0%, Samoan by 0.4%, and other languages by 25.3%. No language could be spoken by 1.5% (e.g. too young to talk). New Zealand Sign Language was known by 0.2%. The percentage of people born overseas was 39.7, compared with 28.8% nationally.

Religious affiliations were 35.1% Christian, 1.7% Hindu, 1.2% Islam, 0.2% Māori religious beliefs, 1.5% Buddhist, 0.2% New Age, 0.5% Jewish, and 1.0% other religions. People who answered that they had no religion were 52.5%, and 6.0% of people did not answer the census question.

Of those at least 15 years old, 1,854 (50.1%) people had a bachelor's or higher degree, 1,314 (35.5%) had a post-high school certificate or diploma, and 537 (14.5%) people exclusively held high school qualifications. The median income was $62,100, compared with $41,500 nationally. 1,113 people (30.1%) earned over $100,000 compared to 12.1% nationally. The employment status of those at least 15 was that 1,965 (53.1%) people were employed full-time, 522 (14.1%) were part-time, and 78 (2.1%) were unemployed.

Individual statistical areas
Name	Area (km^{2})	Population	Density (per km^{2})	Dwellings	Median age	Median income
Mission Bay	0.92	2,712	2,948	1,140	46.8 years	$61,500
Mission Bay Eastridge	0.62	1,620	2,613	660	38.8 years	$63,100
New Zealand					38.1 years	$41,500

== Education ==
The local secondary schools are Selwyn College and Glendowie College.

== Gallery ==
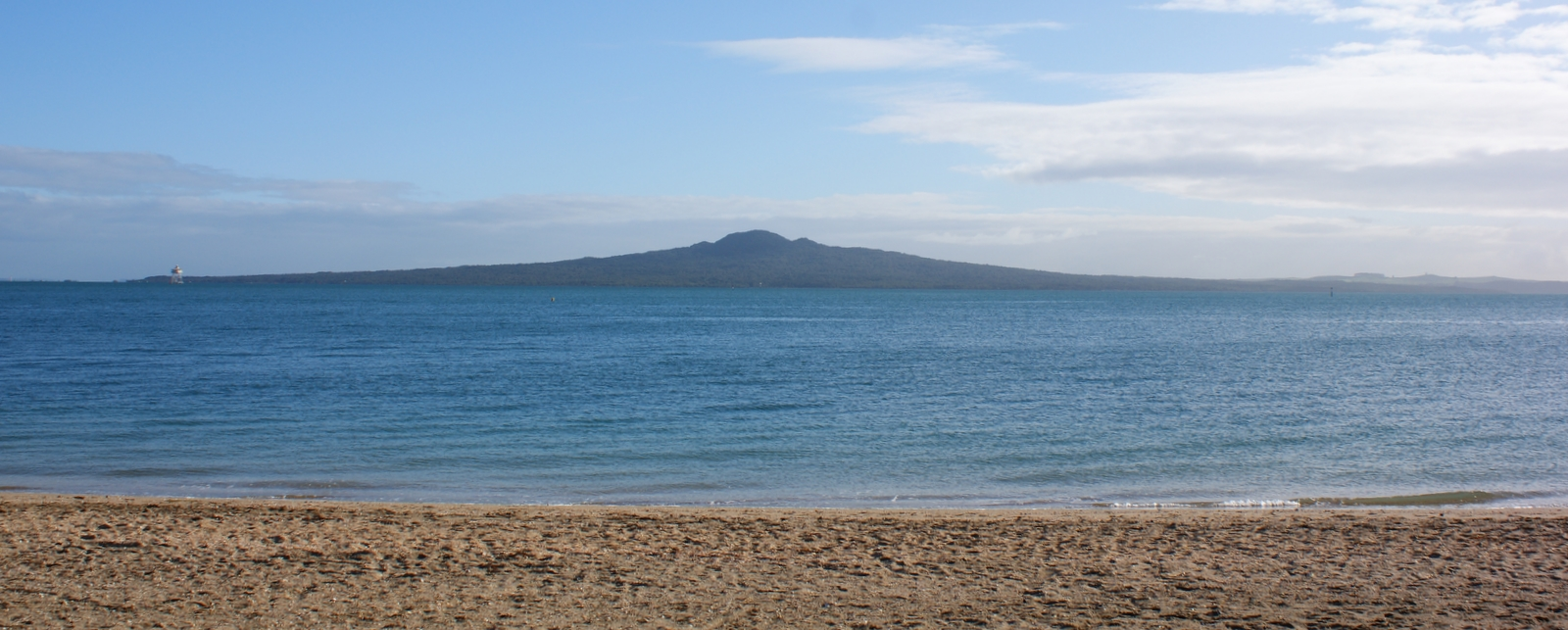
View of Rangitoto from Mission Bay

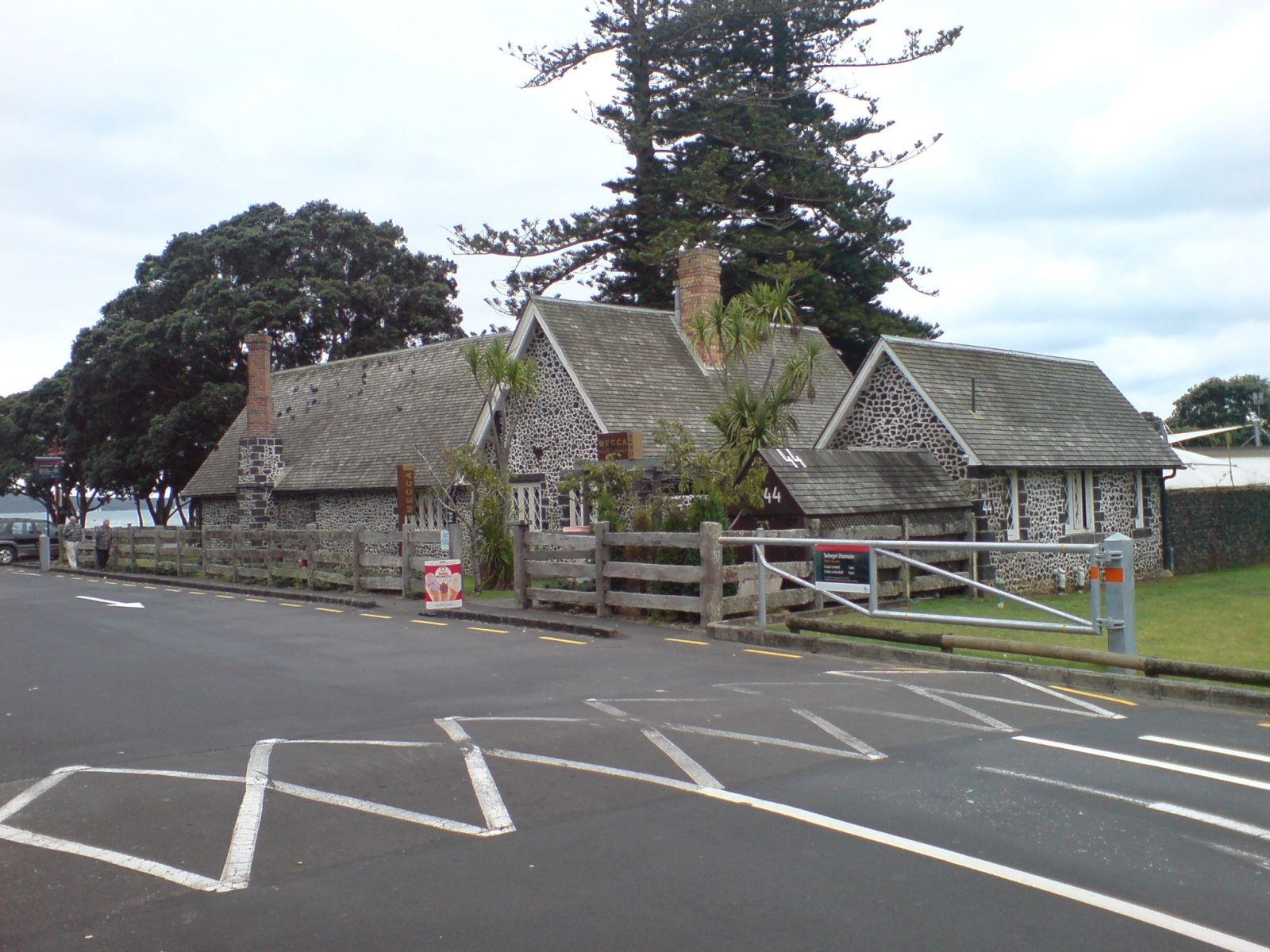
Melanesian Mission House

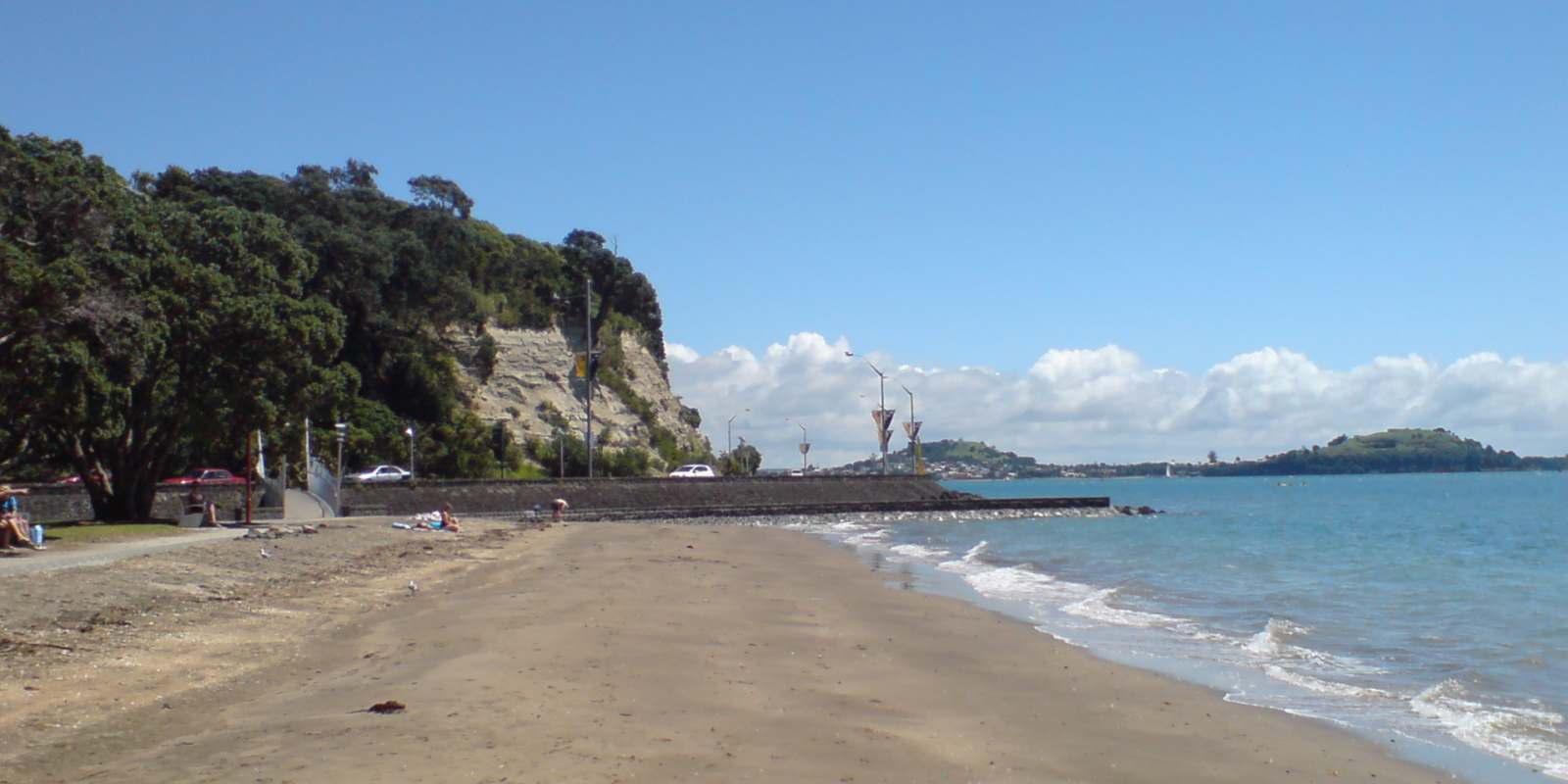
View of Mission Bay Beach looking west

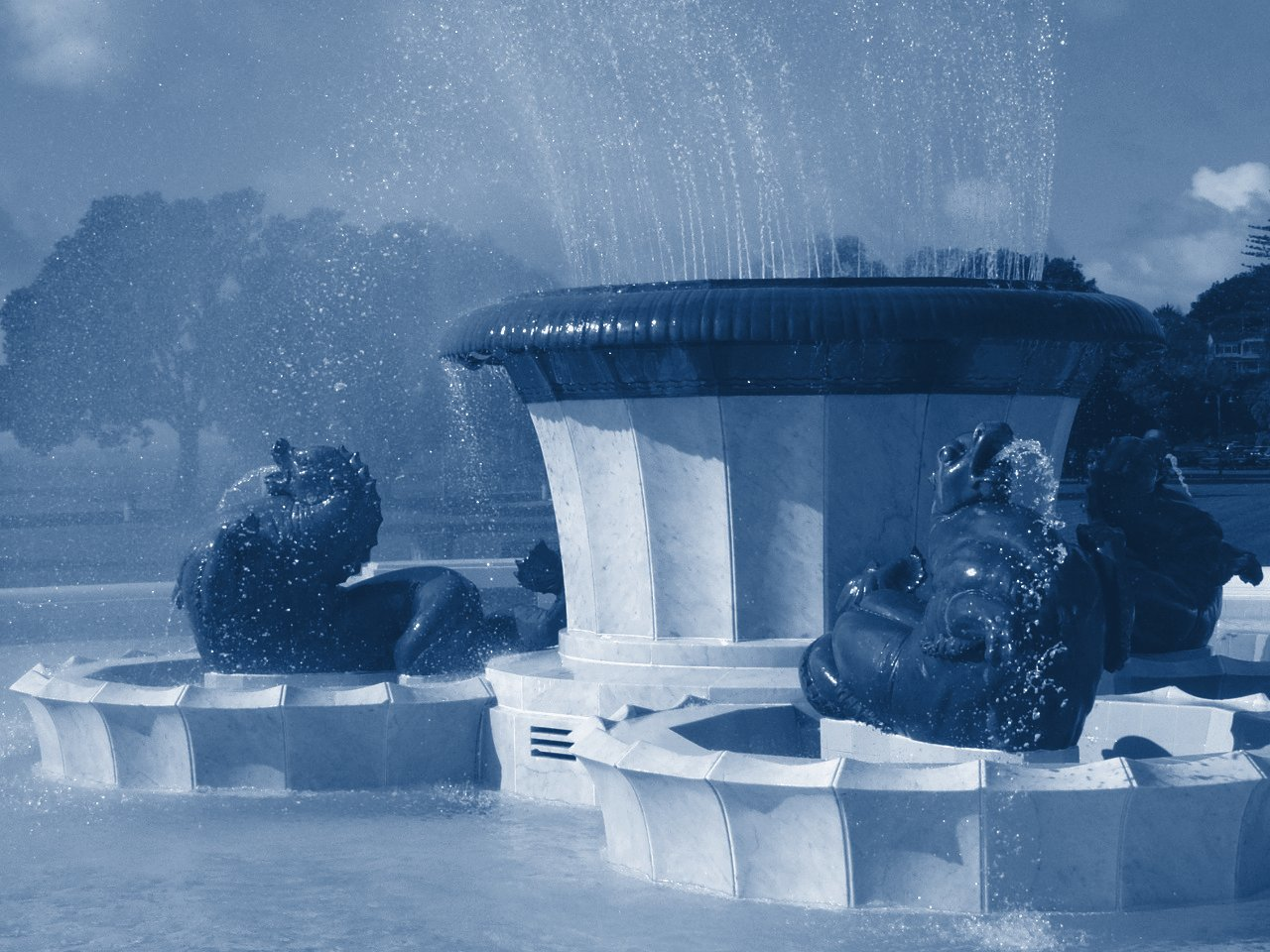
Mission Bay Fountain
