= Walsh brothers (aviation) =

New Zealand engineers

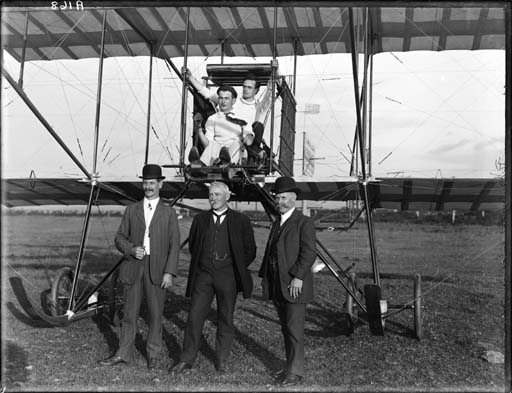
Leo and Vivian Walsh sitting in the Manurewa No. 1, with financial backers standing in front

The Walsh brothers of the New Zealand Flying School, Vivian Claude Walsh (6 November 1887–3 July 1950) and Austin Leonard (Leo) Walsh (5 February 1881–16 July 1951) were pioneers of New Zealand aviation. Vivian is most noted for being the first New Zealander to gain a pilot's certificate, and completing New Zealand's first recognised powered flight in 1911. The brothers opened the New Zealand Flying School in 1915 to train pilots for the Royal Flying Corps in the First World War.

== Childhood and early life ==
Leo Walsh was born on 5 February 1881 in Bradford, Yorkshire. He was the oldest of four children to James Austin (Austin) Walsh and Jane Mary Towler. Their second child, Veronica, was born in 1883. The following year the family emigrated to New Zealand and settled in Auckland. Their third child, Vivian, was born on 6 November 1887 in Auckland. Their final child, a daughter called Doreen, was born in 1895. Austin Walsh was a businessman and managed an Auckland tobacco manufacturing company. He was responsible for producing New Zealand's first machine-manufactured cigarettes, under the 'Atlas' brand. Their mother, Jane, died in 1904 from cancer.

Vivian and Leo were foundation students at King's College in Remuera. The Walshes were Roman Catholics, and Leo attended St. Patrick’s College, Wellington for a year. Their father, Austin Walsh recognised a strong interest in engineering at a young age, and did all he could to foster this. With their father, the brothers established a mechanical engineering and motor importing business, called the British-American Engineering Company, in Auckland. Leo and Vivian were also founding members of the Auckland Power Boat Association, and part of their business involved selling and servicing Kelvin marine engines.

== Early aviation ==
=== Aero Club ===
In 1910, the brothers were heavily involved in the formation and creation of the Aero Club of New Zealand. Fascinated by accounts of aviation experiments in Europe and America, they formed the Aero Club with other enthusiasts. There were originally 25 members, and Leo was the foundation president. By late 1910, members of the club had four aeroplane projects under way, which included the Walsh brothers’ venture.

=== Manurewa No. 1 ===
The Walsh Brothers, with support from other members of the Aero Club wished to build and fly an aeroplane. In early 1910, they obtained financial backing from Auckland businessmen A.N. & G.B. Lester and A.J. Powley. With this finance, they bought plans for a British Howard Wright biplane, with materials and an 8 cylinder engine for £750.

Though the initial impression was that the plane would arrive ready to assemble, this was not the case. The 8 cylinder 60-80h.p. E.N.V engine and 8ft 3 inch long propellor were the only parts ready when it arrived. Honduras mahogany for the wooden components arrived in rough bundles cut to approximate lengths. Construction and assembly of the Howard Wright biplane started on 13 August 1910, and took 5 1/2 months to complete. Their sisters, Doreen and Veronica, sewed 500 yards of fabric which alone took weeks.

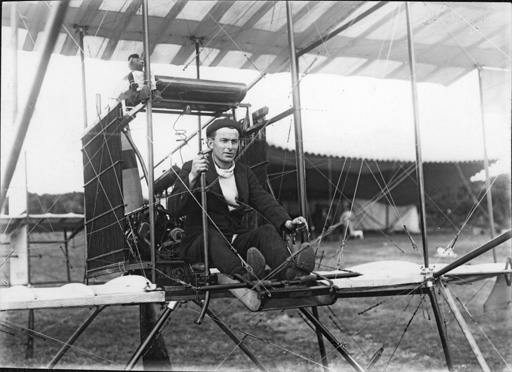
Vivian Walsh, sitting on the Manurewa No. 1

Once complete, the brothers sought out an ideal location for test flights. The brothers landed upon South Auckland as the idea place for test flights, due to relative flat land. They made an arrangement with a well-known farmer and horse trainer, William Walters, in Papakura. Walters owned a private racecourse called Glenora Park. In January 1911 the Walshes disassembled the plane, and sent all the aeroplane components to Takanini by rail.

The Prime Minister, Sir Joseph Ward, who was also vice-patron of the Aero Club, paid a special visit to inspect the plane. He christened it the Manurewa No. 1; meaning soaring bird. The Manurewa No. 1 had inscriptions of "The Walsh Aeroplane Co. Aeronautical Engineers Constructors Auckland" and "Aero Club New Zealand" on the tail.

==== First recorded flight ====
The first successful aeroplane flight recorded in New Zealand took place at Glenora Park, Papakura on the morning of 5 February 1911. The Manurewa No. 1 rose to a height of 60 feet, flew for approximately 400 yards, and then made a safe landing. The flight was witnessed by a small group of local residents, Aero Club members and family. This was the first recognised powered flight made in New Zealand. Vivian completed all flight trials. Leo never became a pilot because he feared his reactions were too slow.

Following a few more test flights, a private flight was arranged for newspaper reporters and photographers on 9 February 1911. A short flight was accomplished, which concluded with the brakeless Manurewa colliding with a fence. This feat was praised as an aviation milestone.

==== Crash ====
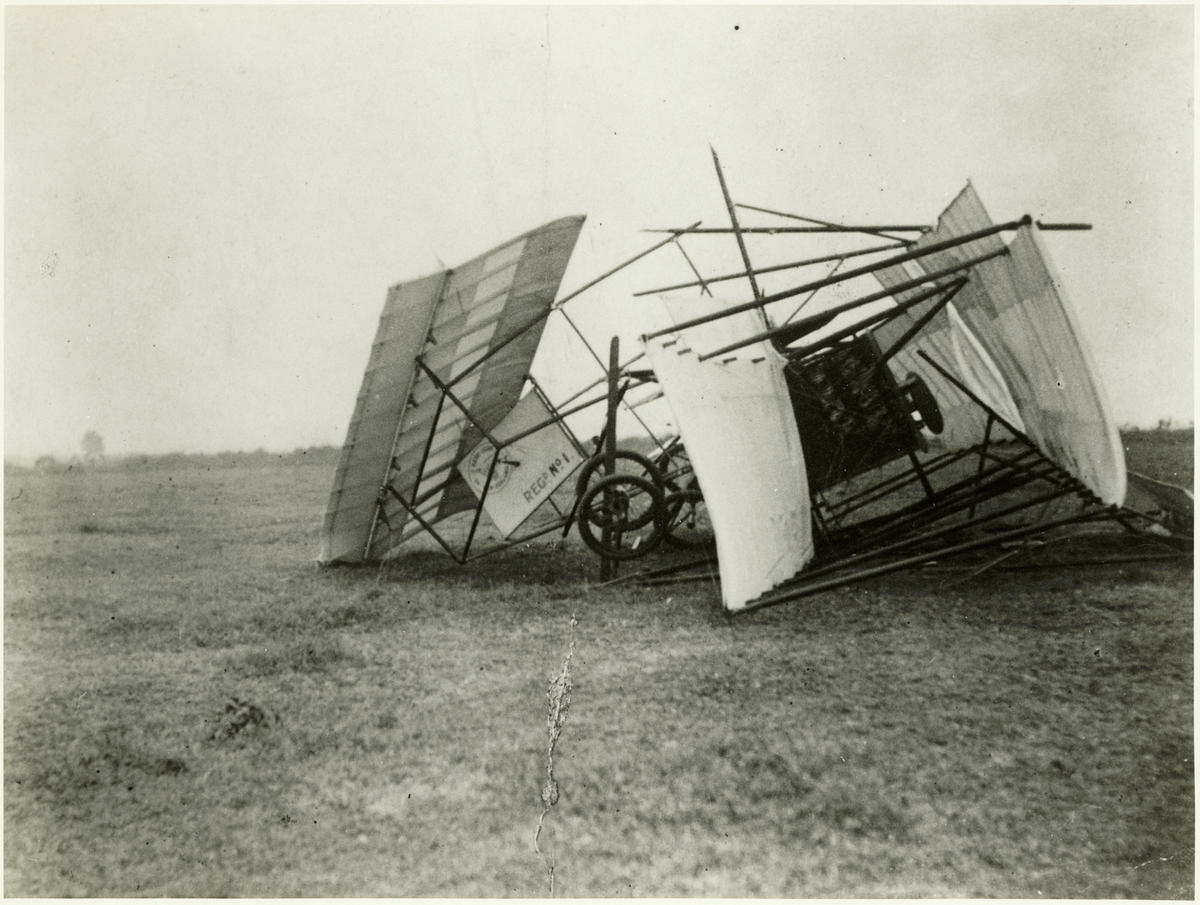
Damage to the Manurewa after crashing

After the success of the first flight, plans were put in place to continue flying, including a public demonstration at the Auckland Domain on 22 April 1911. However, during a practice flight on a different patch of grass at Glenora, one of the skids caught an unusual mound of Earth. The Manurewa No. 1 summersaulted and became a total wreck. Vivian miraculously managed to climb out with only a minor knee injury. The remains of the plane were wheeled back to the Walsh home in Remuera. They started completely rebuilding the plane, which took months.

==== Repossession ====
However, tensions started to build between the Walsh's and the financial syndicate backing them. After the accident, Vivian practiced caution and patience in the rebuilt plane. The financial syndicate funding the Walsh Brothers became unhappy with Vivian's "excessive caution". The syndicate were bent on the idea of a public demonstration from the Auckland Domain, and were unable to understand the hesitancy from the brothers. The Auckland Domain had many trees, hill and buildings, in comparison to the flat lands in Papakura. Conscious of his limited experience, Vivian did not wish to attempt this.

The syndicate sent the Walshes a written demand that the Manurewa No. 1 be flown in the domain, and from there, flown over Auckland City. However, the Walshes were adamant. By 3 votes to 2, the syndicate decided to exercise their legal right to repossess the Manurewa No. 1.

== Walsh Brothers Flying Boats ==
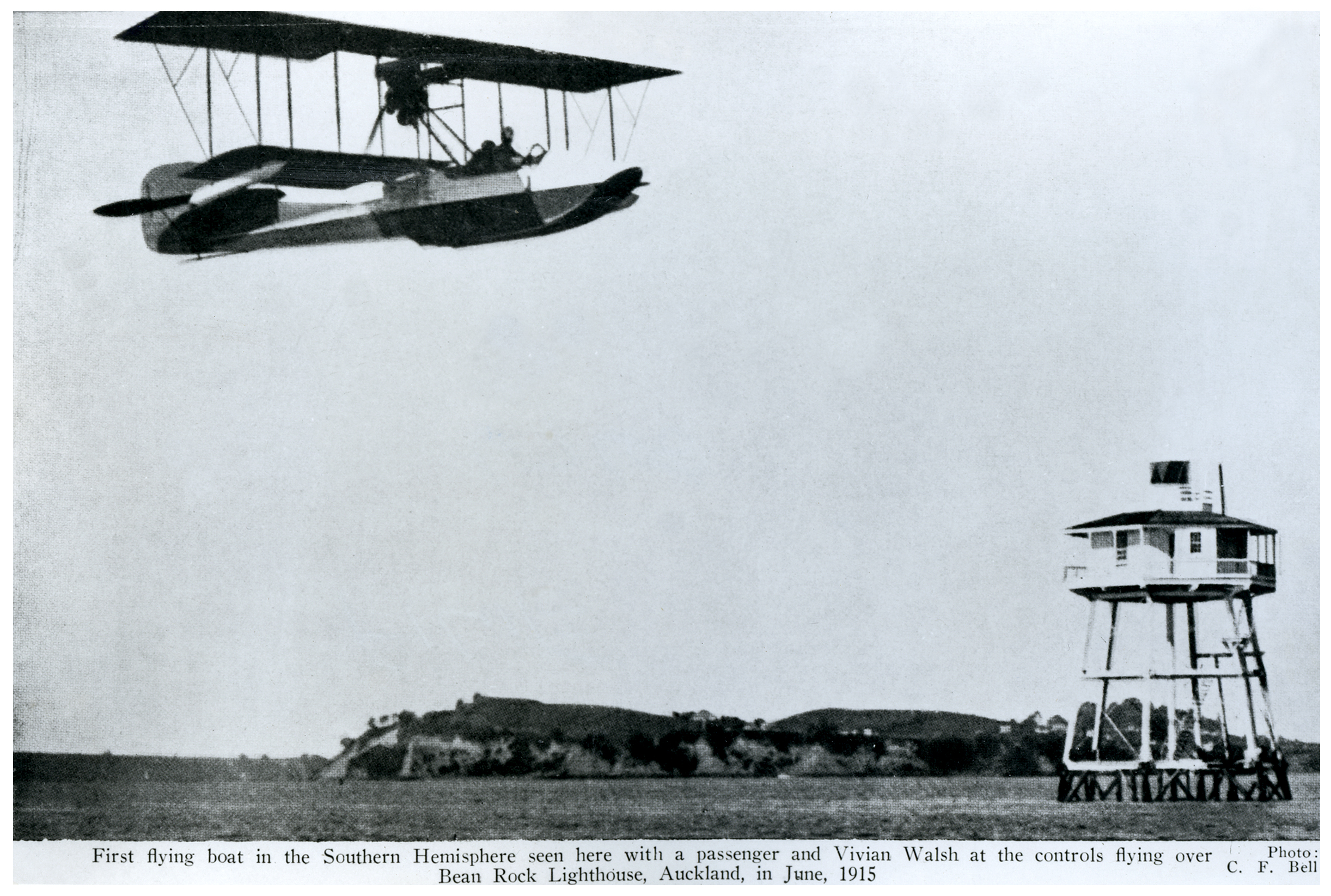
Vivian Walsh and Passenger, c.1915

Despite the setback of having the Manurewa No. 1 repossessed, the Walsh Brothers were determined to continue with aviation. In 1913, Leo worked out the design for a 'flying boat' of the Curtiss type. These were of interest to the United States Navy at the time. The brothers did not have any financial backing, until they won the support of Mr R.A. Dexter. Dexter was an American engineer and motor dealer who had recently migrated to New Zealand. He was an avid fan of aviation, and was a foundation member of the Aero Club of New Zealand, alongside the Walshes.

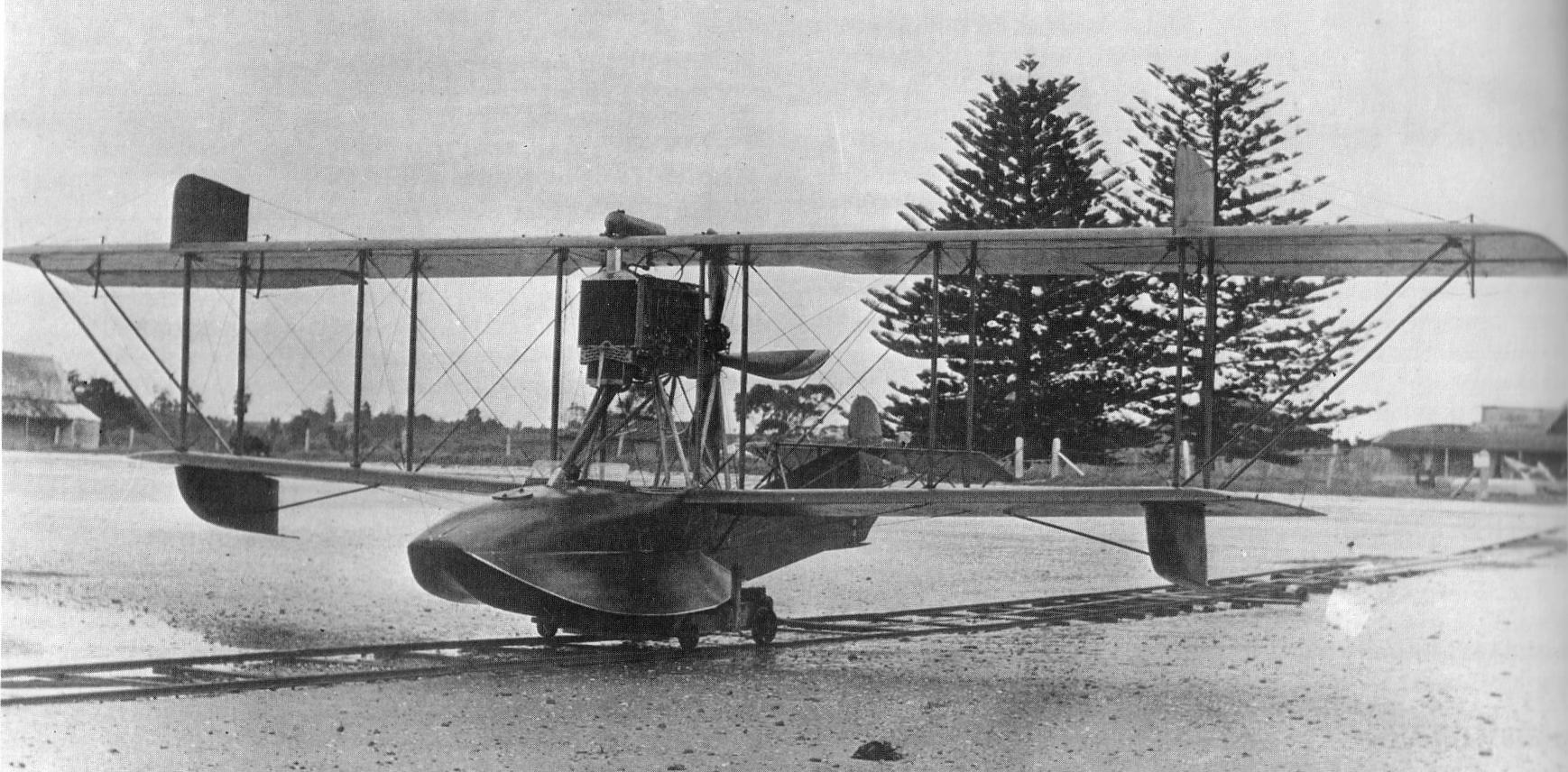
Walsh Brothers Type D Flying Boat of 1918

On 25 September 1913, the Walsh's began construction of a sea plane. Each piece was fashioned in a shed, and then assembled on the lawn of the Walsh's home. It total, it took 15 months of spare time work to complete the flying boat. Progress was necessarily slow, but when War broke out, efforts were made to speed up progress. In December 1914, the plane was ready.

The craft was disassembled, and transported under darkness to Bastion Point, Orakei. On New Years Day, 1915, the flying boat received its 'Salt Water baptism'. After taxiing on the water, Vivian was successful in making the seaplane airborne. In the New Zealand Yachtsman, published 9 January 1915, it noted the strange craft on the water, which turned out to be a flying board that could go over 50 mph. On 14 March 1915, Vivian completed the first successful passenger flight. A keen demand for flights grew after this. Upon payment of a fee, and weather permitting, passenger flights of 5 miles became regular.

== The New Zealand Flying School ==
With the outbreak of war in 1914, aviation was presented as a new opportunity in warfare. The New Zealand Government were initially very hesitant. By the middle of 1915, New Zealand was the only Commonwealth Dominion that had not sent qualified pilots to England to join the Royal Flying Corps as part of the Empires Forces.

The Walshes approached the government asking whether they could help with training pilots, but were refused. Following this, the brothers sent communications to the Imperial Government in England asking whether pilots trained in New Zealand would reach the required standards of the Royal Flying Corps (RFC), and what qualifications were required. The British Government responded that all candidates with the Royal Aero Club's certificate in New Zealand would be accepted, and that as many candidates as possible should be sent.

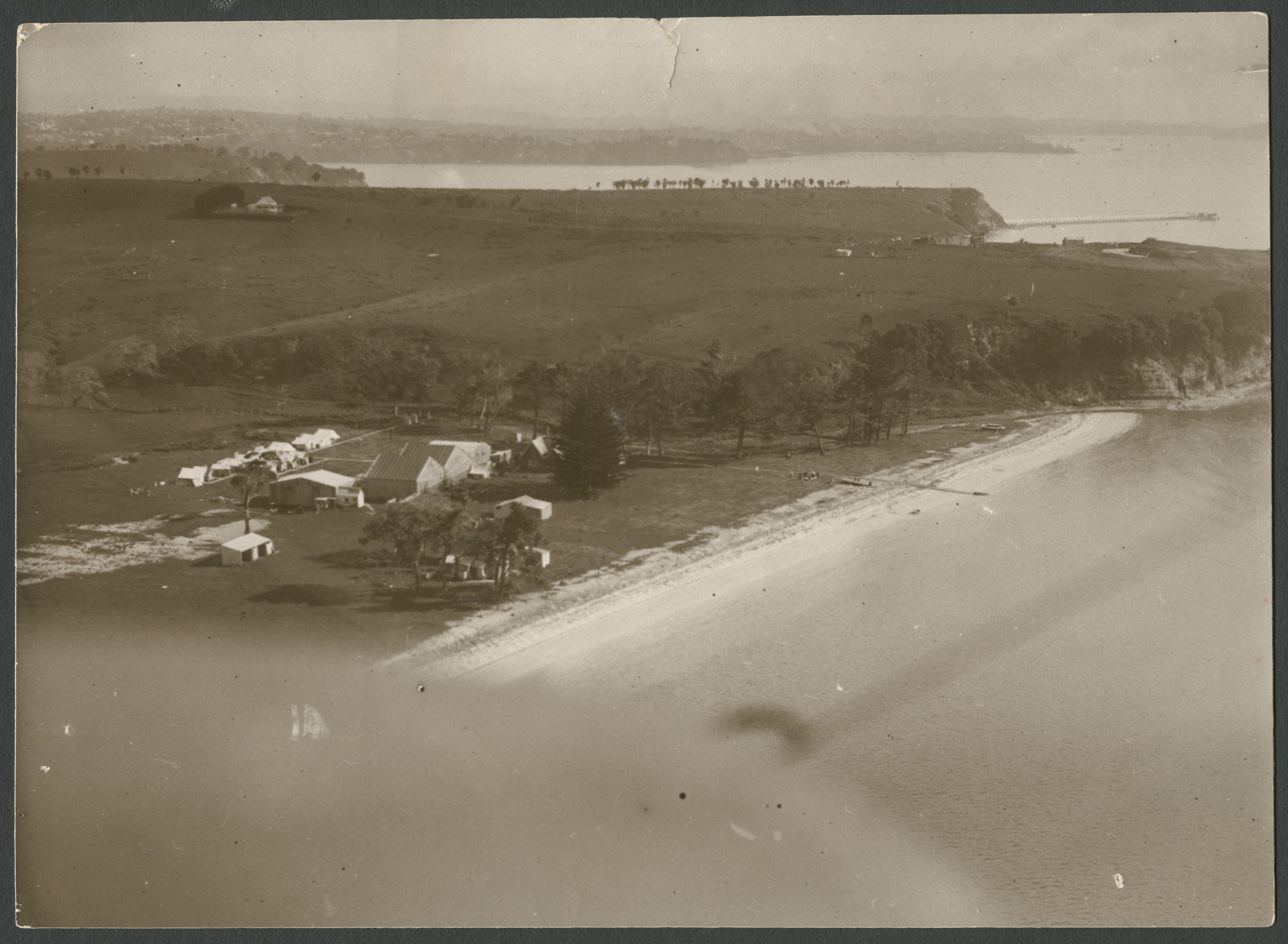
Aerial Photo of the School c.1920 photographed by George Bourne

The New Zealand Flying School was formed and started training pupils in October 1915, with admission costing £125. Leo Walsh was managing director and Vivian Walsh was superintendent and chief instructor. R. A. Dexter was also a director, and Austin Walsh acted as secretary. Both Walsh sisters were also involved in the practical running of the school. Other staff included engineers and mechanics to maintain the various aircraft. The Walsh family lived together in a house which overlooked the flying school.

The school was first established in Orakei, where it operated for the first 10 months. In August 1916, 5 acres (which was later extended to 7 acres) of land was leased in western Kohimarama (modern day Mission Bay) from the Melanesian Mission Trust. This allowed the school to expand its operations extensively.

The Walshes created a six month training course in their flying boats. 110 men did the course, and 68 qualified for the RFC, Royal Naval Air Service (RNAS) or Royal Air Force. Notable students included Keith Caldwell, who was one of the original three pupils.

== Post World War I ==
At the end of the war, it was unclear whether the Flying School would still be required. However, the 1919 Bettington Report on aviation recommended to the government that the school be maintained. In 1919, Vivian was forced to give up flying due to ill health, and turned to helping manage the school with Leo. The school imported new aeroplanes, including the first Boeing model, several American Boeing-Westervelt seaplanes. The school also received aeroplanes that had been gifted to the New Zealand Government. However, very soon the financial burden of operating the school became onerous. The brothers attempted to explore other routes to establish a commercial aviation industry in New Zealand.

=== Airmail ===
Leo Walsh worked extensively to interest the Post and Telegraph Department in the viability of using aeroplanes for mail delivery. In collaboration with Postmaster-General Gordon Coates, the first mail flight took place on 16 December 1919, from Auckland to Dargaville. Leo Walsh was the supervisor and George Bolt was the pilot of the successful flight. Despite the success, the Walshes failed to interest the New Zealand government in airmail services.

=== Air passenger flights ===
The acquisition of new aeroplanes allowed the Walshes to increase the number of passenger flights. These were conducted throughout the North Island, which gave many their first sight of an aeroplane. It was reported in the Waikato Independent on 1 March 1921 that the cost for a passenger flight was "...at the reasonable fee of £2 10/ each."

=== Air surveying ===
The Walshes were involved in early surveying flight projects. In 1921, the Fijian government sponsored the Walshes to conduct survey flights of the islands. A SuperMarine Channel flying boat was shipped to Suva. Leo Walsh and a pilot flew between the islands of Viti Levu, Vanua Levu, Taveuni and Ovalau. This was the first aeroplane seen in Fiji.

=== Closure ===
Despite all of these ventures, the Walshes failed to gain the interest of the New Zealand government in their commercial pursuits or for continuation of funding for the school. The school closed in 1923, and the government acquired all assets for £10,500 in 1924. This amount was insufficient to give shareholders any return. The Walshes gave up all involvement in the aviation industry due to the closure of the school and Vivian's inability to continue piloting.

== Death and commemoration ==
=== Death ===
After the closure of the school, the brothers returned to their engineering business. Vivian died on 3 July 1950, aged 62 at the family home in Mission Bay. Leo died a year later, at age 70 on 17 July 1951. They were survived by their two sisters, Veronica and Doreen. None of the Walsh siblings married or had children.

=== Walsh Memorial Air Pageant ===
While the brothers received no official recognition during their lives, in 1952 the Auckland Branch of the Royal Aeronautical Society, concerned to preserve the memory of the brothers' contribution, formed the Walsh Memorial Air Pageant Organisation. Several events raised significant monies for educational purposes – now administered via the New Zealand Aeronautical Trusts Ltd.

In October 1953, a major air show, the Walsh Brothers Memorial Air Pageant, was held at Whenuapai Airport in Auckland to raise funds. The exhibition included a British European Airways Vickers Viscount, an RAAF GAF Canberra A84-202, a Royal Air Force English Electric Canberra, three Vampires of No.75 Squadron RNZAF and several others. Whenuapai

=== Mission Bay Manurewa sculpture ===
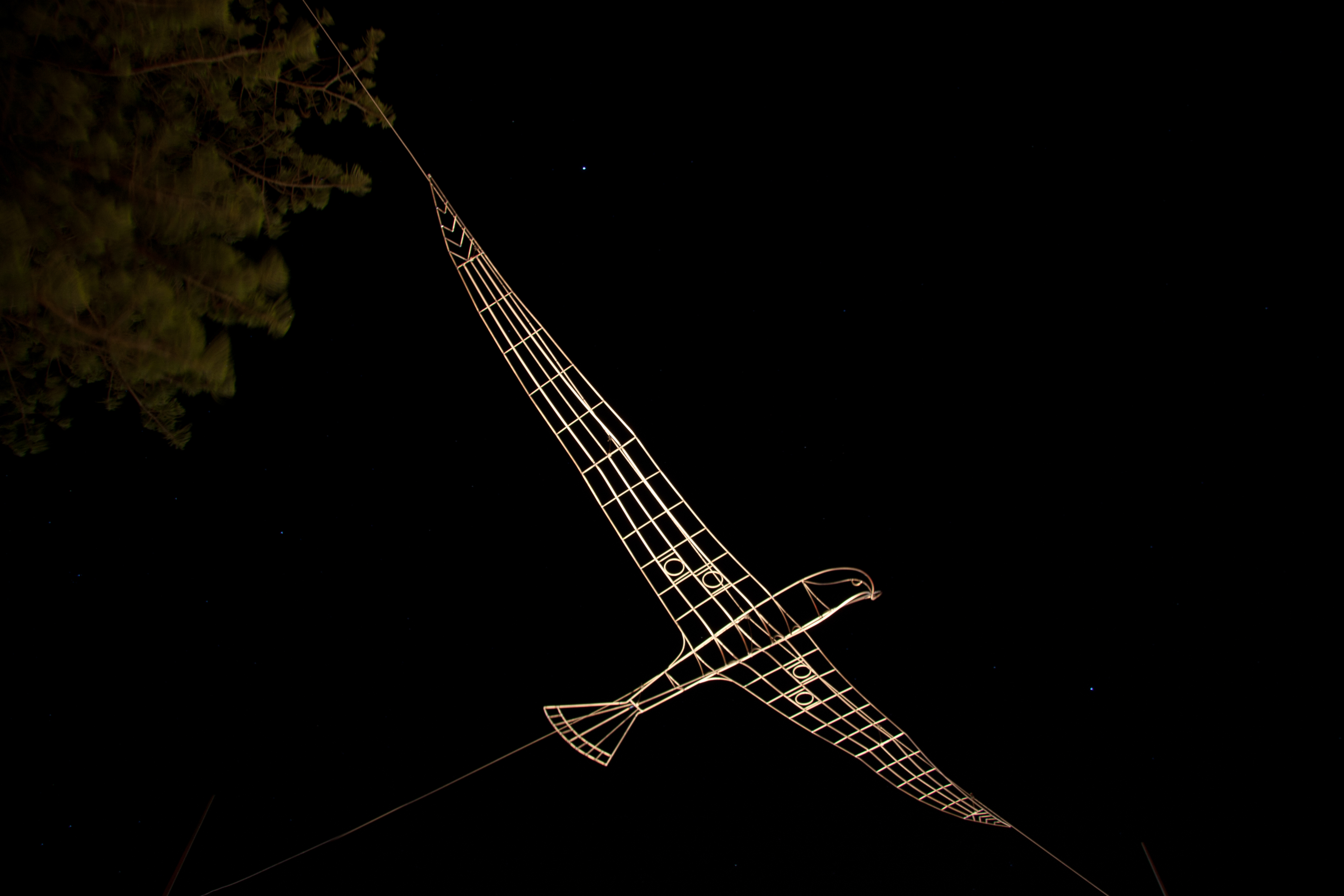
Fred Graham's 2007 sculpture titled Manurewa, located at Mission Bay's Selwyn Reserve

A sculpture by Fred Graham at Mission Bay, titled Manurewa to commemorate the Walsh brothers was erected in December 2007. Though originally part of Kohimarama at the opening of the New Zealand Flying School, Mission Bay was renamed as its own suburb in the late 1910s. The project was initiated by the Mission Bay-Kohimarama Residents Association, and predominantly funded by the Eastern Bays Community Board.

The sculpture, at Mission Bay's Selwyn Reserve depicts a gigantic bird with a wingspan of 6m, made from titanium rods, suspended 6m high by stainless steel wire. The Plaque attached to the sculpture reads "The artwork is inspired by the military and civilian aviation accomplishments of Leo and Vivian Walsh including their renowned flying school based [here] at Mission Bay".

=== Walsh Memorial Scout Flying School ===
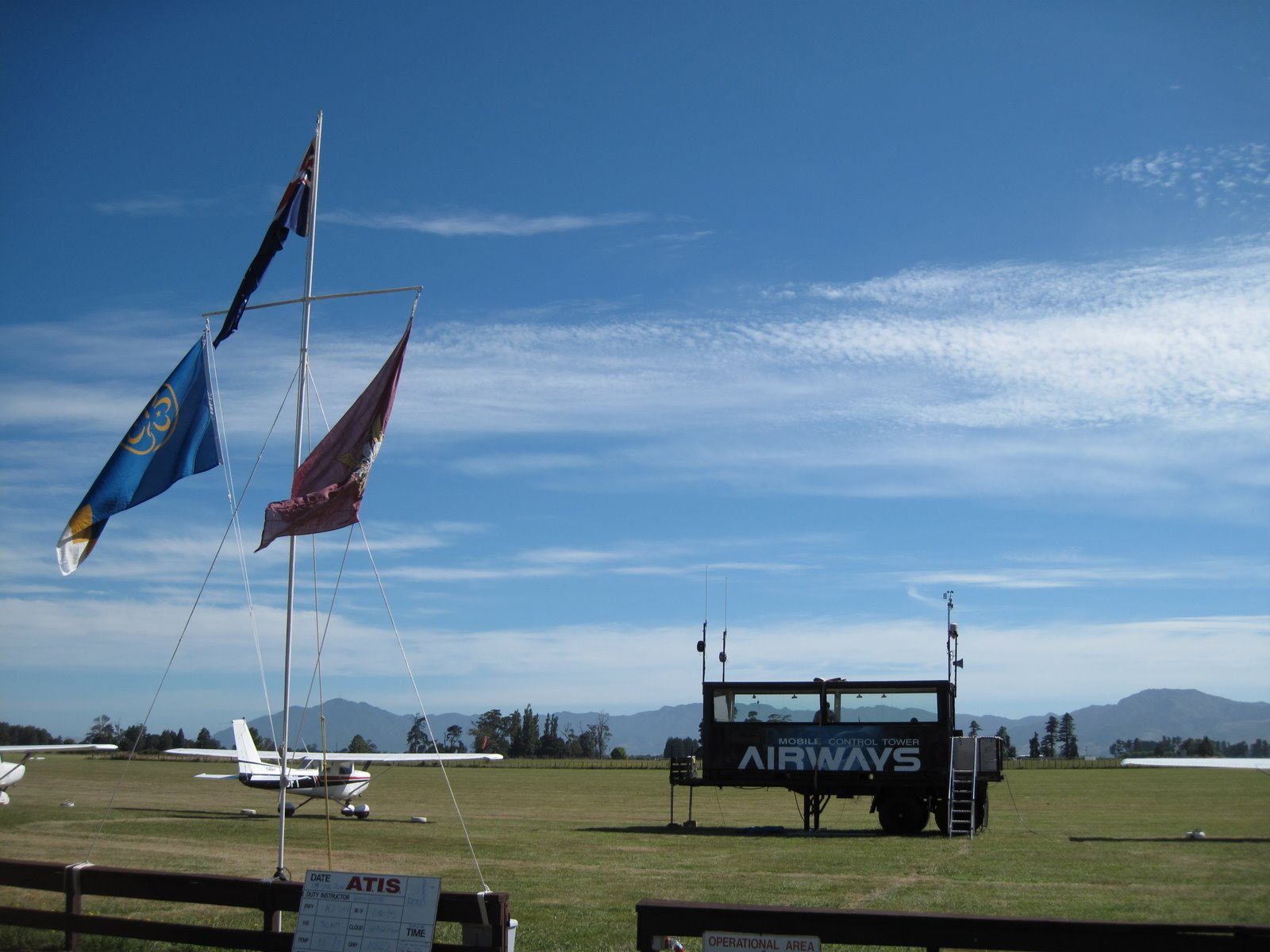
The Annual Walsh Memorial Scout Flying School 2010

The annual Walsh Memorial Scout Flying School for young people has been run annually by the Scout Association of New Zealand since 1967. Every January, approximately 70 students aged 16–19 from various backgrounds camp for two weeks at Matamata aerodrome.

The Walsh Trophy is presented at the end of each camp, with the recipient being "the best all round ab-initio student in flying, exam and leadership at the school".

=== Walsh Memorial Library ===
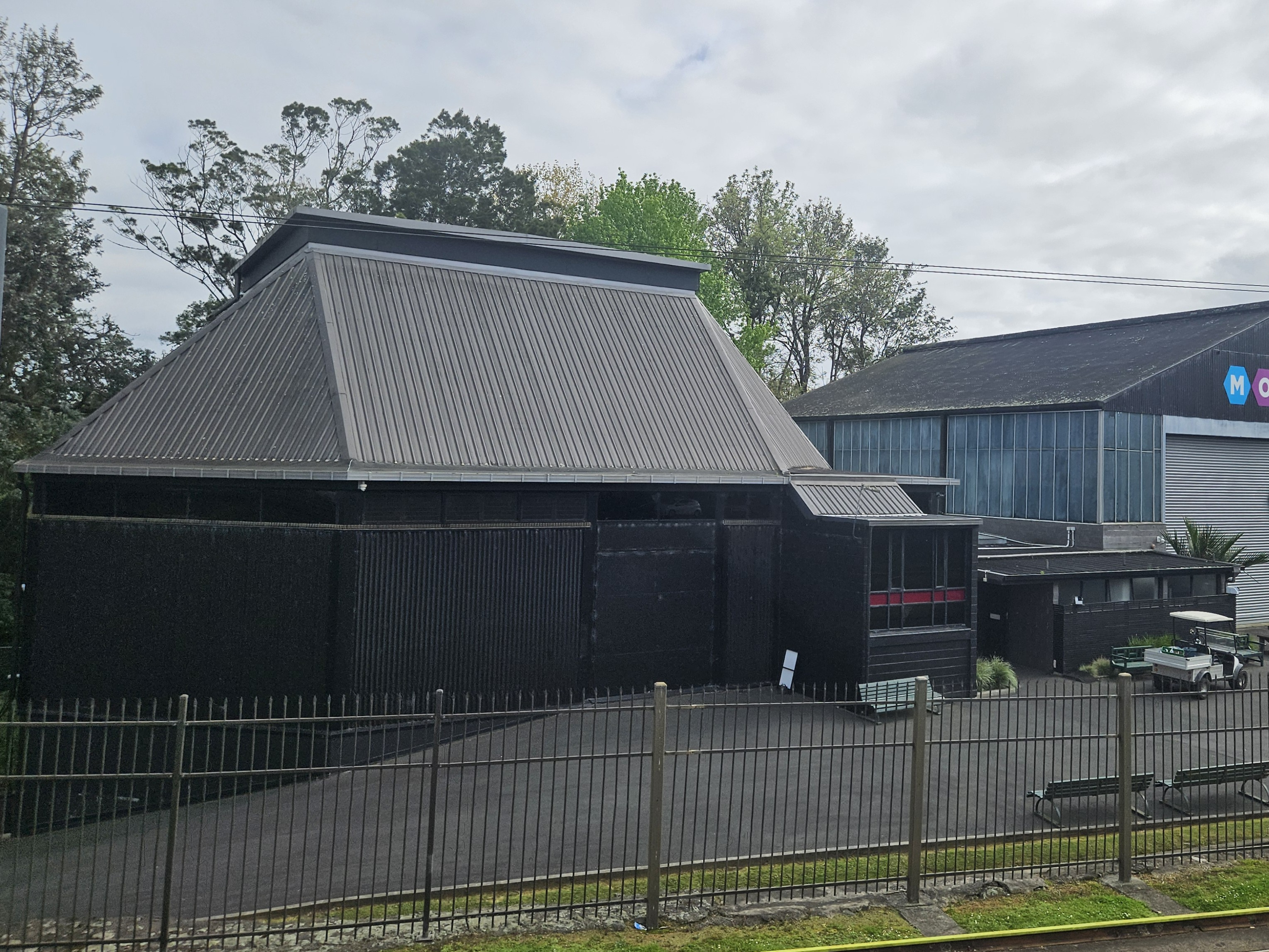
Walsh Memorial Library, MOTAT

The Walsh Memorial Library, named for the Walsh brothers at the Museum of Transport and Technology (MOTAT) in Auckland opened in 1964. It was set up with support from the Walsh Memorial Trust and the Royal Aeronautical Society. The Walsh Memorial Library is a reference library which houses collections of manuscript, pictorial, published, and oral history collections based on New Zealand aviation, transport and technology.

=== 75th anniversary plaque ===
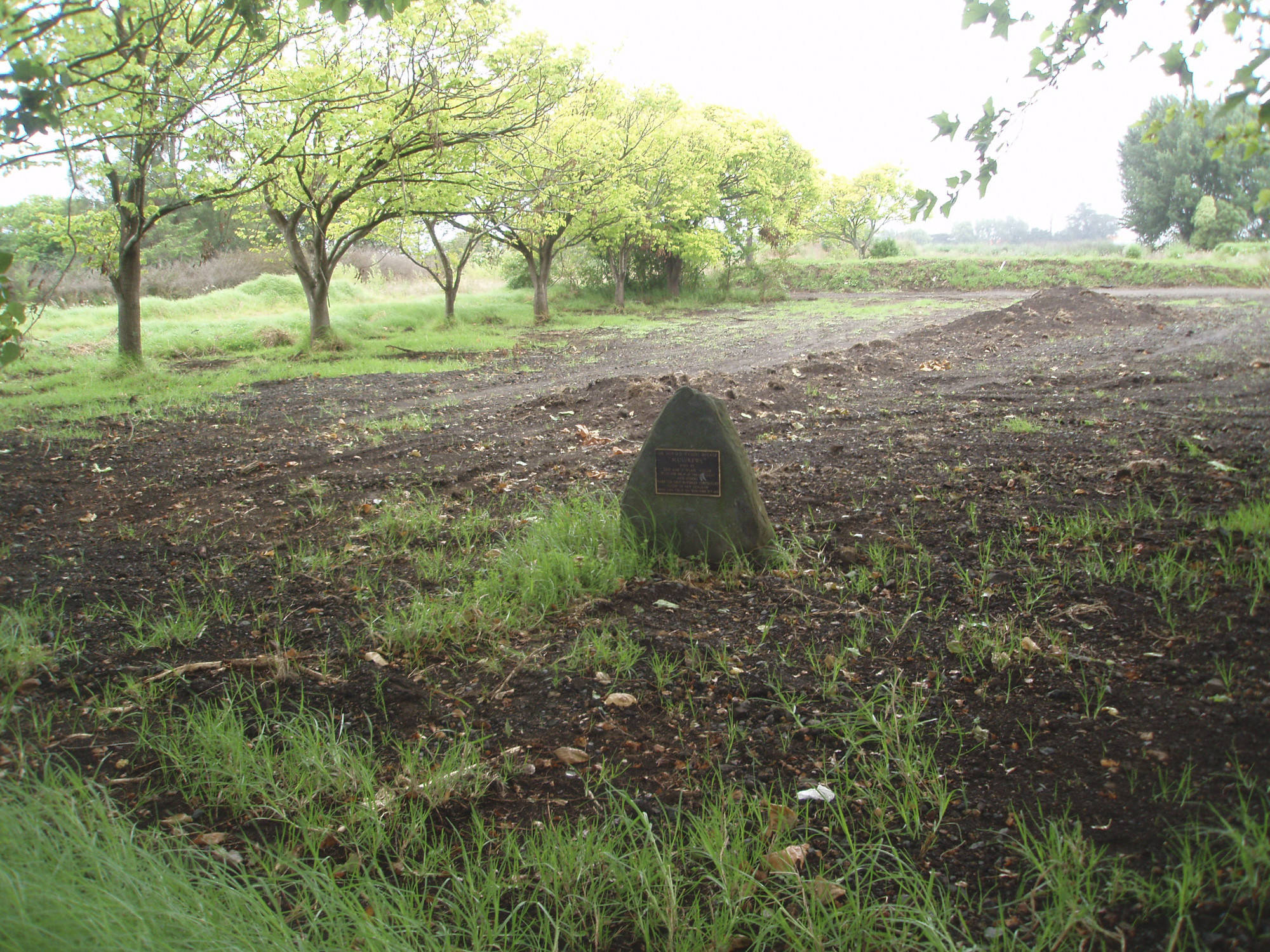
Memorial stone erected on the site of the first manned, powered flight in New Zealand, Airfield Road, Takanini

A Memorial stone was erected at the location of the first flight of the Manurewa, on modern day Airfield Road, Takanini. The memorial was unveiled in 1986, to commemorate the 75th anniversary of the flight.

The plaque reads: "The Howard Wright biplane, 'Manurewa', built by Leo and Vivian Walsh with the help of their sisters and others made the first powered controlled flight in New Zealand from this field on February 5th 1911".

=== Walsh Brothers Place ===
Walsh Brothers Place is a small, predominantly service road adjacent to the Auckland Airport Domestic Terminal. Walsh Brothers Pl. is connected to a series of roads named after other notable aviators, including Geoffrey Roberts Road, George Bolt Memorial Drive, Cyril Kay Road and Andrew McKee Avenue.

== See also ==
- Richard Pearse
- Herbert Pither
