= George Bourne (photographer) =

New Zealand photographer

- Born: 17 August 1873; Wellington, New Zealand
- Died: 10 March 1924 (aged 48); Auckland, New Zealand
- Occupation: Photographer

George Isaac Bourne (17 August 1873 – 10 March 1924) was a New Zealand photographer who worked for the Auckland Weekly News for over twenty years. He was considered a pioneer of press photography. Bourne was also known for his work with Māori portraiture and was the first European to be invited into the home of the Maori prophet Rua Kenana in 1908. Bourne was an adventurous photographer and travelled extensively throughout New Zealand during his time with the Auckland Weekly News. He photographed the Urewera region after the New Zealand Wars and in 1917 captured the eruption of the volcano Mount Ngauruhoe. In 1909 his first montage for the Auckland Weekly News was published and in 1920 Bourne took photos of the Walsh Brothers Flying School, becoming one of the first in the Southern Hemisphere to experiment with aerial photography.
