= Keith Caldwell =

New Zealand fighter pilot (1895–1980)

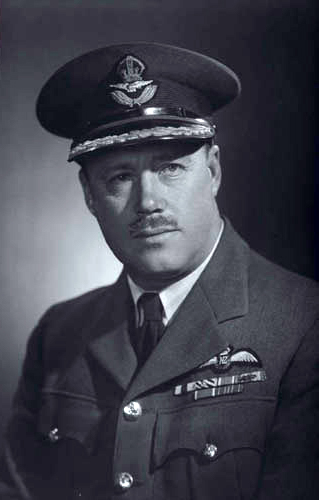
- Group Captain Keith Caldwell c. 1944
- Born: 16 October 1895; Wellington, New Zealand
- Died: 28 November 1980 (aged 85); Auckland, New Zealand
- Military career
- Allegiance: New Zealand
- Branch: New Zealand Army; Royal Flying Corps; Royal New Zealand Air Force
- Service years: 1914–1919; 1930–1946
- Rank: Air Commodore
- Nickname: Grid
- Units: No. 8 Squadron (1916); No. 60 Squadron (1916–1917); No. 74 Squadron (1918)
- Commands: No. 74 Squadron (1918); RNZAF Base Woodbourne (1939–1942); RNZAF Base Wigram (1942–1944)
- Conflicts: First World War; Western Front; Second World War
- Awards: Commander of the Order of the British Empire; Military Cross; Distinguished Flying Cross & Bar; Mentioned in Despatches (2); Croix de guerre (Belgium)

Air Commodore Keith Logan "Grid" Caldwell, CBE, MC, DFC & Bar (16 October 1895 – 28 November 1980) was a New Zealand fighter ace of the Royal Flying Corps in the First World War who also rose to the rank of air commodore in the Royal New Zealand Air Force during the Second World War.

== Early life ==
Born in Wellington on 16 October 1895, Keith Logan Caldwell was the son of David Robert Caldwell and his wife Mary Dunlop née McKerrow. His parents moved the family to Auckland when Caldwell was a child and he was educated at King's College and Wanganui Collegiate School. Interested in the military, he served in the Defence Cadet Corps while still at school. On completing his education, he worked as a bank clerk.

== First World War ==
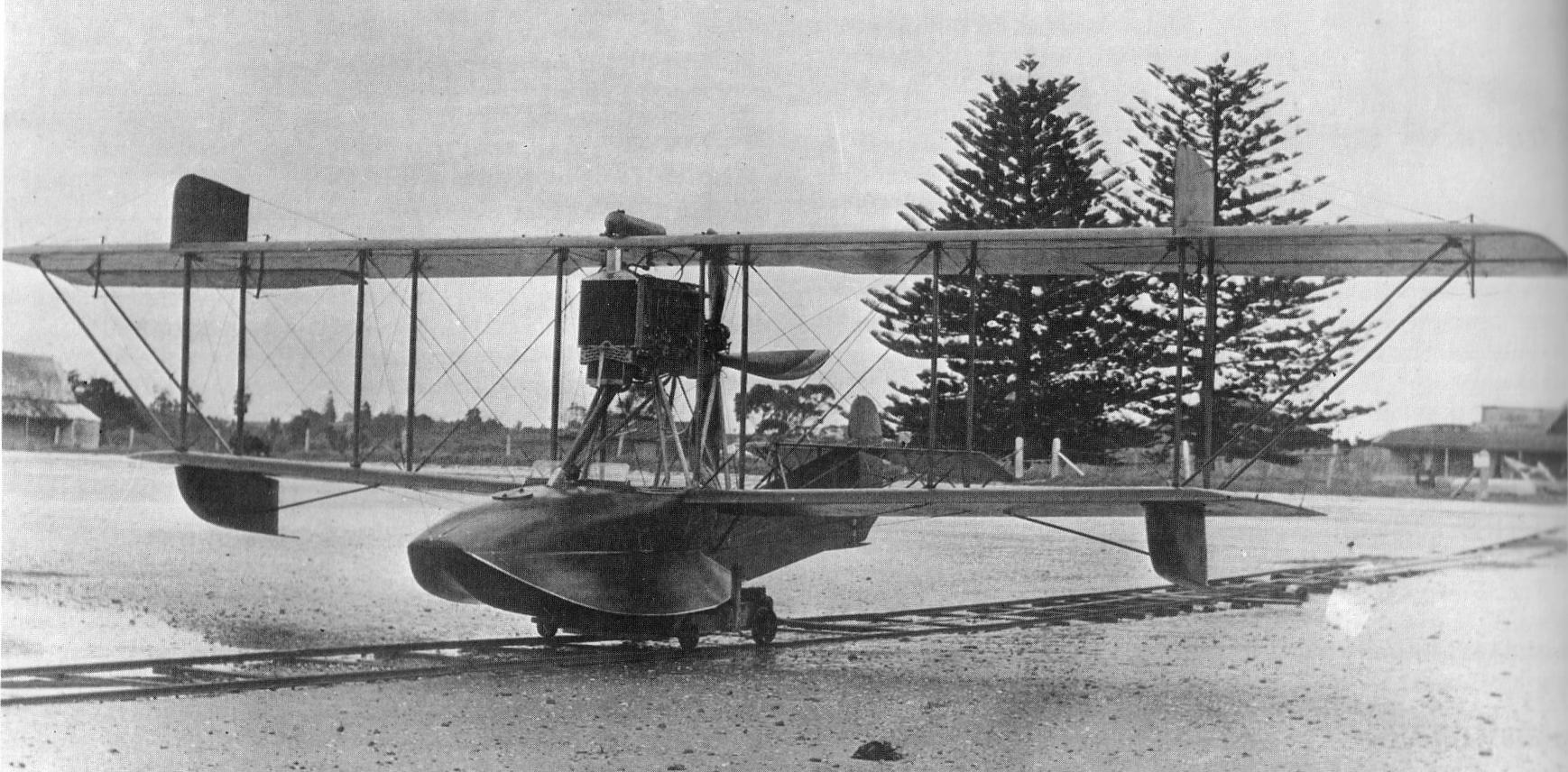
Walsh Brothers pilot training flying boat

On the outbreak of hostilities in August 1914, Caldwell attempted to enlist in the New Zealand Expeditionary Force, raised for service in the war, but was declined. He paid £100 to join the first class at the New Zealand Flying School, run by brothers Vivian and Leo Walsh, in October 1915, where he learned to fly on the Walsh Brothers Flying Boats. He referred to aircraft as "grids", or bicycles, a habit which earned him his nickname. A quick learner, he soloed on 28 November. However, bad weather meant he was not able to complete the Royal Aero Club tests required to graduate.

Despite this, Caldwell sailed for England in January 1916. He carried with him a letter from the Walsh brothers attesting to his flying competency. He was subsequently commissioned into the Royal Flying Corps. He was trained at Oxford, Norwich and Sedgeford. On 29 July he was posted to No. 8 Squadron, which operated Royal Aircraft Factory B.E.2s on observation duty near Arras. He flew extensively throughout the next four months and had at least seven encounters with German aircraft during this time. In one of these encounters, on 18 September, he and his observer shot down a Roland C.II.

=== No. 60 Squadron RFC ===
Towards the end of 1916, Caldwell was transferred to No. 60 Squadron, which flew Nieuport 17 fighters. By February 1917 he was a flight commander in the squadron, having been promoted to captain. By September, when the unit converted to Royal Aircraft Factory S.E.5s, Caldwell had scored further victories, all against Albatros scout aircraft. He received the Military Cross on 17 September, by which time he had added his first victory in an S.E.5. The citation, published in The London Gazette, read:

For conspicuous gallantry and devotion to duty when leading offensive patrols. On one occasion he led a patrol of five machines against twelve hostile aircraft, all of which he drove down out of control. He has personally destroyed five hostile machines, and has had over fifty contests in the air, in all of which he has displayed splendid skill and fearlessness, and has set an excellent example to his squadron.

— The London Gazette, No. 29328, 15 October 1915

In October 1917 Caldwell was posted back to England as an instructor.

=== No. 74 Squadron RAF ===
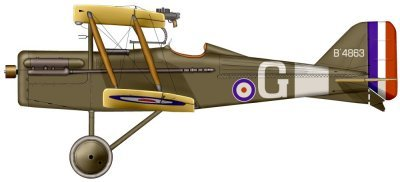
Se5a

In February 1918 Caldwell was elevated to the rank of major and appointed commander of No. 74 Squadron, which was equipped with the S.E.5. He took the squadron to France the following month and, based at Clairmarais, it flew its first sortie on 12 April.

Caldwell was awarded the Distinguished Flying Cross in December, the citation stating: "A fine fighting airman of courage and determination. On 4th September, when on offensive patrol, he, in company with another machine, attacked four Fokker biplanes; one of these was driven down by this officer. He has accounted for five enemy machines."

Although never shot down, Caldwell once survived a mid air collision with another pilot of No. 74 Squadron, Sydney Carlin, nursing his crippled aircraft to ground level before climbing out of the cockpit and jumping clear as it crashed. Caldwell fought inconclusive dogfights with German flying aces Werner Voss and Hermann Becker. A natural pilot with excellent eyesight and a talent for finding enemy aircraft, Caldwell's weakness was that, as a poor shot, he frequently was unable to destroy the aircraft he engaged—a flaw that stopped him joining the ranks of top Allied aces in which he moved.

One of the squadron's flight commanders was flying ace Mick Mannock, and Caldwell thought highly of his tactical skills when engaging opposing aircraft. He also criticised Mannock; after the Briton killed two German airmen who had crash landed behind Allied lines, Caldwell wrote: "The Hun crashed but not badly, and most people would have been content with this—but not Mick Mannock. He dived half a dozen times at the machine, spraying bullets at the pilot and observer, who were still showing signs of life ... On being questioned as to his wild behaviour after we had landed, he heatedly replied, 'The swines are better dead—no prisoners for me!'".

Under Caldwell's command, No. 74 Squadron claimed a creditable 140 aircraft destroyed and 85 'out of control' for 15 pilots killed or taken prisoner. Caldwell fought his last combat on 30 October, claiming a Fokker D.VII fighter, his ninth aerial victory over this type of aircraft. Altogether he is credited with 11 aircraft destroyed, 2 shared destroyed, 1 shared captured, and 10 and 1 shared 'out of control'. He was awarded a Bar to his Distinguished Flying Cross and, in addition to his Military Cross, was twice mentioned in despatches and received the Croix de Guerre from Belgium.

== Interwar period ==
Transferred to the Unemployed List of the Royal Air Force (RAF) on 17 July 1919, Caldwell returned to New Zealand in August. After a year working for his father he bought a farm at Glen Murray in the Waikato. On 16 May 1923 he married Dorothy Helen Gordon, the sister of fellow flying ace Frederick Stanley Gordon, and had two daughters and two sons.

Caldwell maintained his interest in aviation, being a founding member and first club captain of the Auckland Aero Club. In 1924, when the part-time New Zealand Air Force was formed alongside the New Zealand Permanent Air Force (PAF), Caldwell was the senior officer of the original 72 personnel, all of whom were ex-RAF pilots. The part-time force evolved into the Territorial Air Force (TAF) in 1930, and Caldwell, now holding the rank of wing commander, was its leader. His command consisted of four squadrons; two for army co-operation duties and two bomber units. However, the TAF lacked its own aircraft and relied on the PAF, soon to be renamed the Royal New Zealand Air Force (RNZAF), for equipment and groundcrew. In 1935, he was awarded the King George V Silver Jubilee Medal.

== Second World War ==
During the Second World War, Caldwell served in the RNZAF, as station commander at Woodbourne near Blenheim and later Wigram at Christchurch, before being posted to India in 1944 and England in 1945, where he was promoted to acting air commodore, achieving full rank in 1946. Caldwell was made a Commander of the Order of the British Empire (CBE) in the 1945 New Year Honours.

== Later life ==
Caldwell retired from the RNZAF in 1946 and resumed farming in South Auckland at Glen Murray. He retained an interest in military aviation and in 1960, along with Ronald Bannerman and Leonard Isitt, established the New Zealand 1914–1918 Airmen's Association. Members of the organisation met annually to reminiscence about their wartime experiences. Retiring to live in Auckland in 1970, he died of cancer there on 28 November 1980.
