= Boeing Model 1 =

Floatplane by Boeing

B & W Seaplane
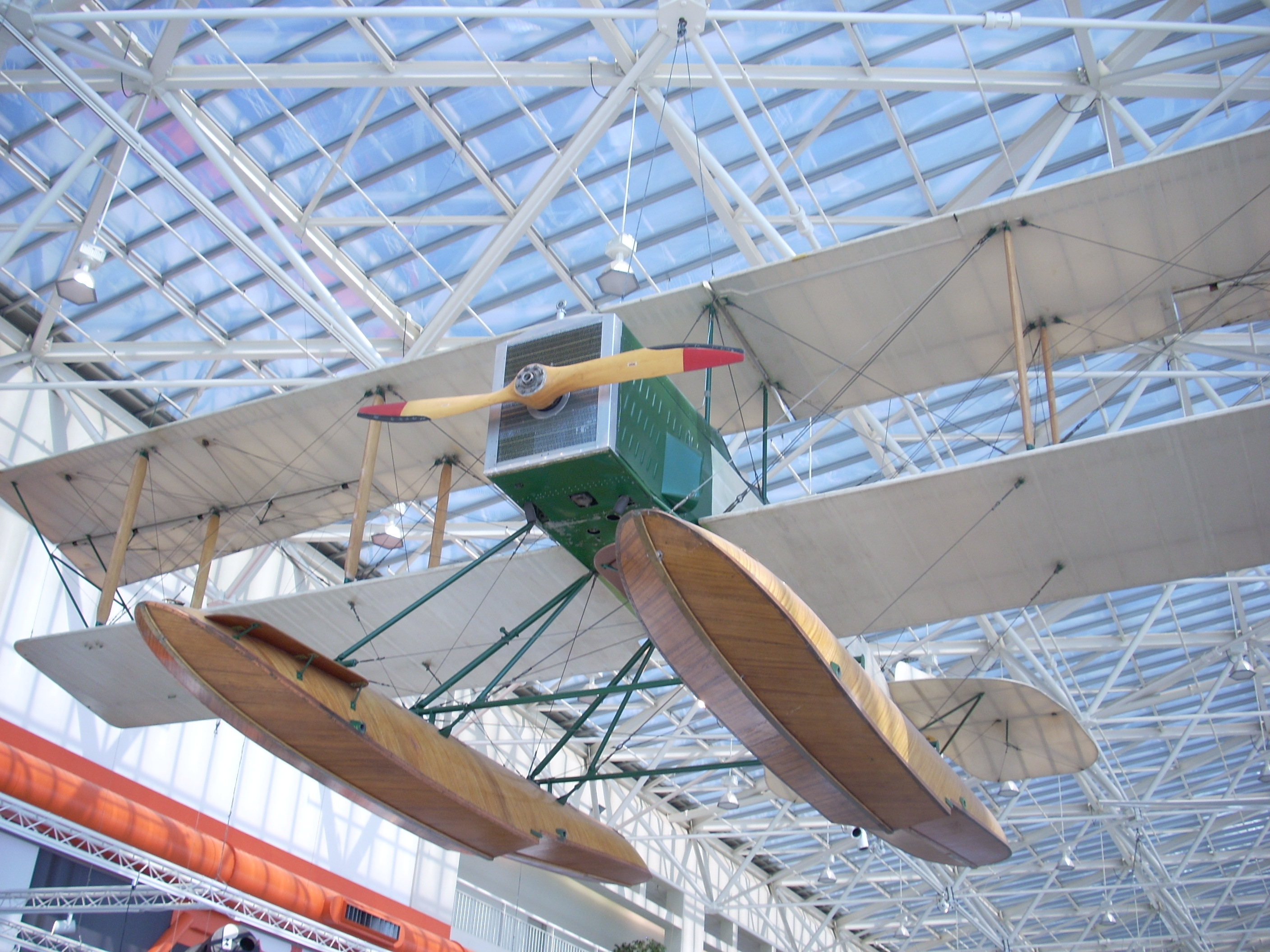
- Boeing Model 1A at the Museum of Flight

General information
- Type: Seaplane
- Manufacturer: Boeing
- Designer: William Edward Boeing; George Conrad Westervelt
- Primary user: New Zealand Flying School
- Number built: 3

History
- Manufactured: 1916
- First flight: June 15, 1916

The Boeing Model 1, also known as the B & W Seaplane, is a United States single-engine biplane seaplane aircraft. It was the first Boeing product and carried the initials of its designers, William Boeing and Lt. Conrad Westervelt USN.

== Design ==
The first B & W was completed in June 1916 at Boeing's boathouse hangar on Lake Union in Seattle, Washington. It was made of wood, with wire bracing, and was linen-covered. It was similar to the Martin trainer aircraft that Boeing owned, but the B & W had better pontoons and a more powerful engine. The first B & W was named Bluebill, and the second was named Mallard. They first flew on June 15, 1916, and in November, respectively.

== Operational history ==
The two B & Ws were offered to the United States Navy. When the Navy did not buy them, they were sold to the New Zealand Flying School and became the company's first international sale. On June 25, 1919, the B & W set a New Zealand altitude record of 6,500 feet. The B & Ws were later used for express and airmail deliveries, making New Zealand's first official airmail flight on December 16, 1919.

To commemorate the 50th anniversary of the company, Boeing built a third B & W Seaplane, designated Model 1A, in 1966. The Model 1A is a modernized replica of the original Model 1 with many structural improvements, including a welded steel tubing fuselage and tail construction. The aircraft also has modernized flight controls and instrumentation and is powered by a derated 170 hp (130 kW) Lycoming GO-435 engine. The Model 1A was originally built as a pure seaplane like the original, though it was later fitted with bolt-on wheels to allow it to operate on land.

== Former operators ==
New Zealand

- New Zealand Flying School

== Specifications (B & W Seaplane) ==
Data from Boeing: History

General characteristics

- Crew: 2
- Length: 27 ft 6 in (8.38 m)
- Wingspan: 52 ft 0 in (15.86 m)
- Wing area: 580 sq ft (53.9 m^{2})
- Empty weight: 2,100 lb (953 kg)
- Gross weight: 2,800 lb (1,272 kg)
- Powerplant: 1 × Hall-Scott A-5 Straight-6 piston engine , 125 hp (93 kW)

Performance

- Maximum speed: 75 mph (121 km/h, 65 kn)
- Cruise speed: 67 mph (109 km/h, 58 kn)
- Range: 320 mi (518 km, 280 nmi)
- Rate of climb: 700 ft/min (3.56 m/s)
