= New Zealand Flying School =

Coordinates: 36.84817°S 174.83059°E

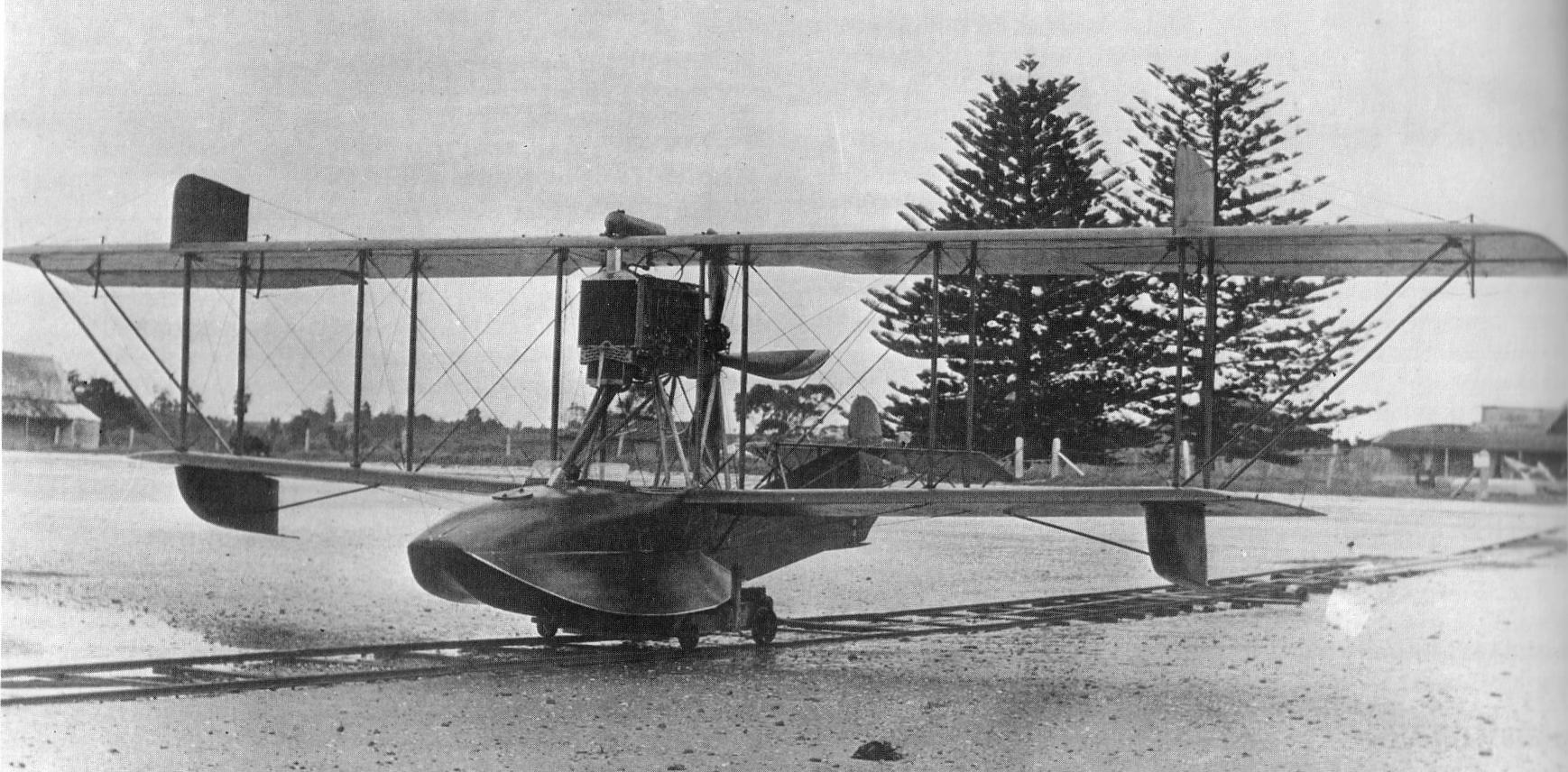
Walsh Brothers type D flying boat

The New Zealand Flying School was formed in 1915, by the Walsh Brothers, Leo and Vivian Walsh, to train pilots for the Royal Flying Corps. The school was also known as the Kohimarama Flying School. The school built, imported and flew flying boats from Mission Bay. 110 pilots trained in the school served in World War I, including notable pilot Keith Caldwell, one of the original three pupils.

The New Zealand Flying School was the first private flying school in the British Empire which trained pilots for military service.

The flying school was sold to the New Zealand Government in 1924 after struggling to survive after the end of the war. The school trained over 1000 pilots by the time the Walsh brothers sold it.

== History ==
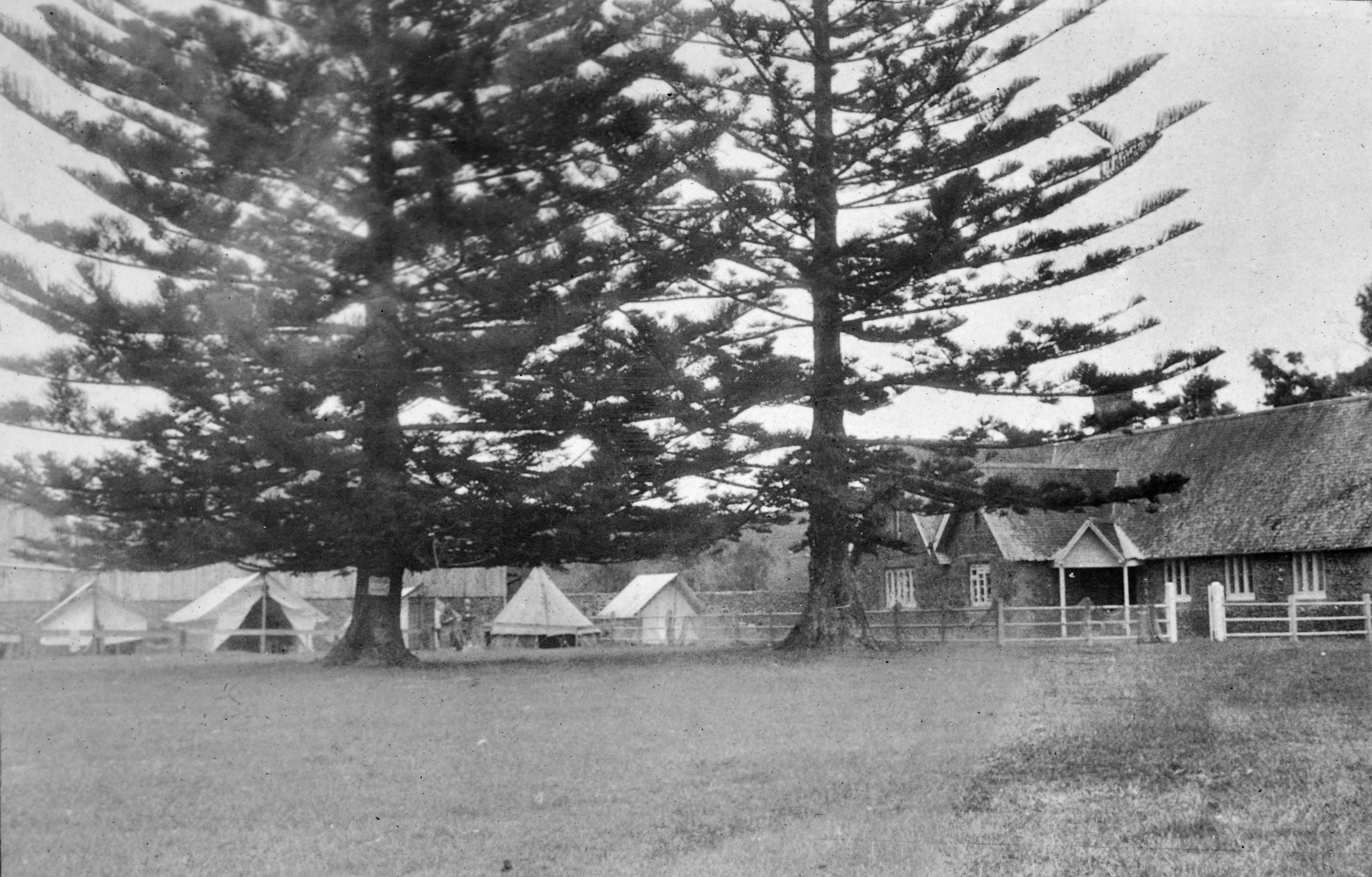
Accommodation tents and the Melanesian Mission building (right) at the New Zealand Flying School, Kohimarama, 1916

=== Inception ===
The Walsh brothers wanted to start a flying school when WW1 broke out to train New Zealand pilots for service. The New Zealand Government refused their request for help, and the brothers instead asked the British Government whether New Zealand trained pilots would be accepted into the Royal Flying Corps. The British Government confirmed that candidates who qualified for the Royal Aero Club's certificate in New Zealand would be accepted in the RFC, requesting that the brothers send candidates immediately.

The flying school first began operating from a shed in Ōrākei, taking the first three pupils on 2 October 1915. At first, Vivian was the only flying instructor. On 28 November 1915, the school moved to the five (and later seven) acres at the western end of Mission Bay, then called Kohimarama Bay. In the same month the school gained its second airplane. It leased buildings from the Melanesian Mission including a kitchen, which it turned into a dining room, and operated here until 1924 when the school was sold to the New Zealand Government.

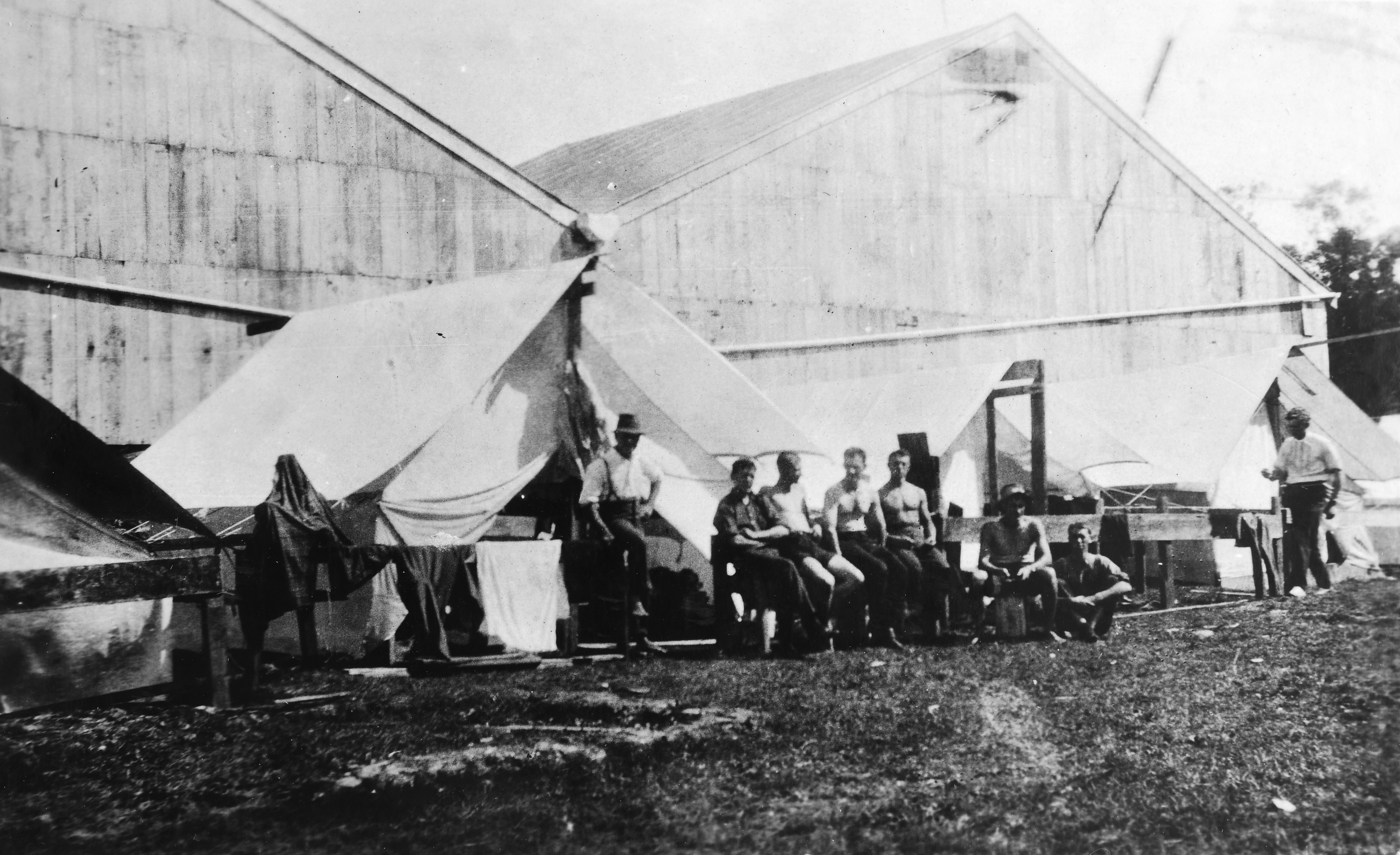
New Zealand Flying School students sitting in the sun outside their accommodation tents in Kohimarama, 1916

=== Management of the School ===
Leo Walsh was managing Director, Vivian Walsh chief pilot and superintendent, R. A. Dexter was director and Austin Walsh was secretary. Walsh sisters Doreen and Veronica were also involved in the running of the school.

The school also employed engineers and mechanics, and ex-students as flying instructors.

=== Development of training programme of further expansion ===
The school was able to expand considerably in 1916, and built hangars by the beach for launching flying boats. The Walsh brothers and their sisters lived in the 'captain's house' at the eastern end of the bay, and students lived in tents and later wooden huts.

The first regular student intake was in 1916. In the same year the school gained Imperial Recognition, which brought official involvement of the New Zealand Defence Department. Military training was incorporated into the programme.

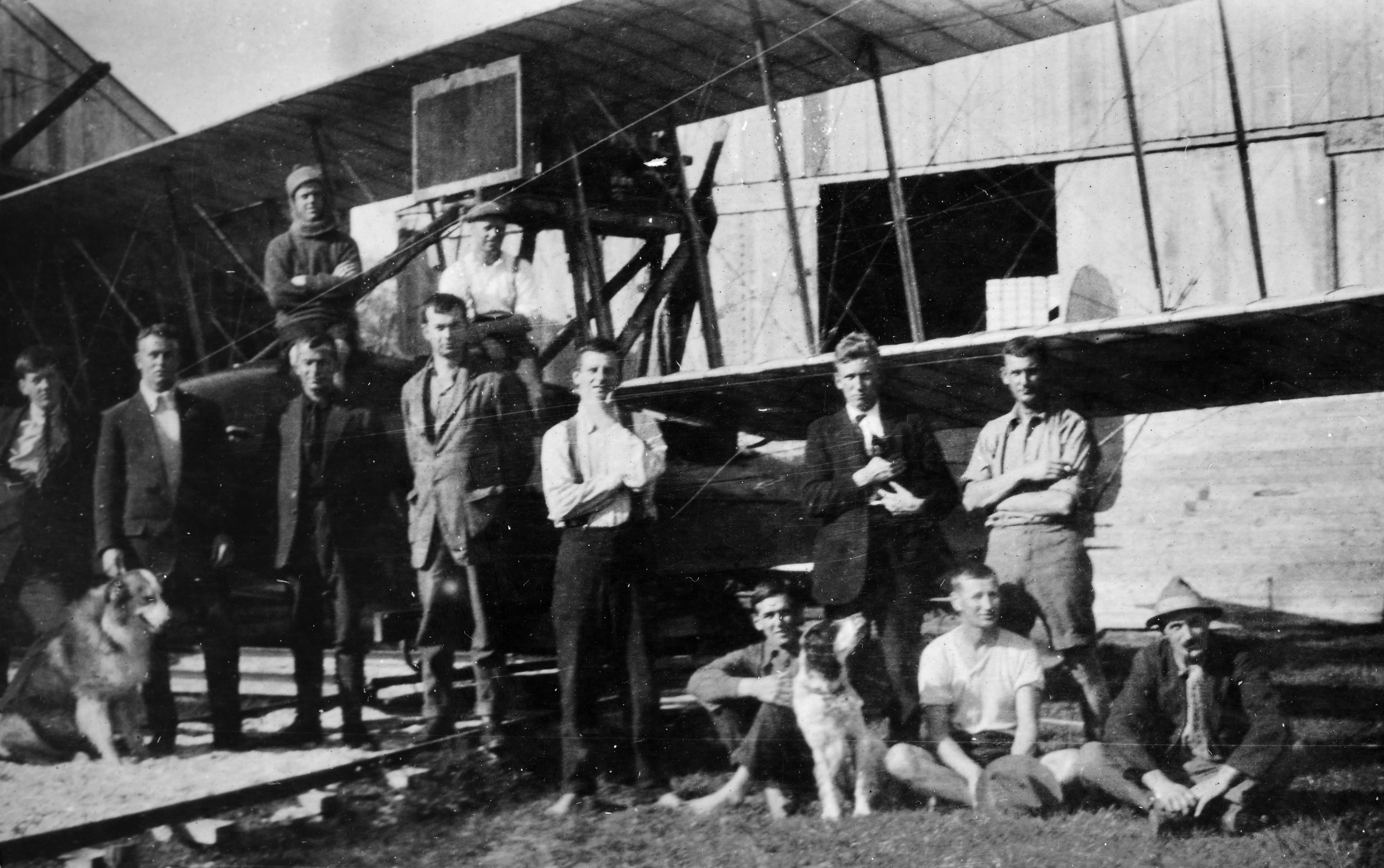
Informal group of New Zealand Flying School students with a Curtiss flying boat. Kohimarama.

On 13 July 1916 the first pilot's certificate was issued to Vivian Walsh, who began training pupils straight away Students were trained in groups of 12-25, and paid £100 each for a flying and engineering course, with £75 reimbursed by the British Government.

=== After the end of World War I ===
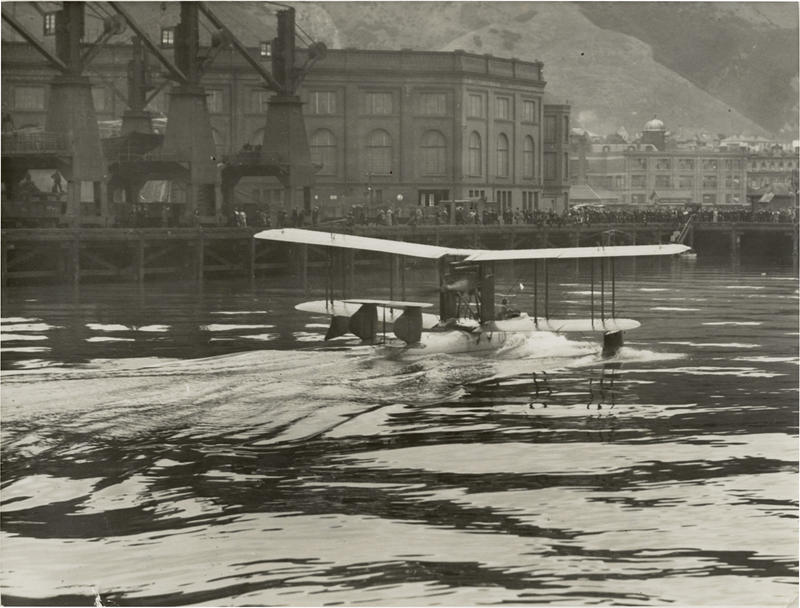
NZFS Supermarine flying boat arrives in Wellington after flight from Auckland on 4 October 1921.

After WWI ended, many more planes were made available for the School. The School purchased two Boeing float planes with 125 horse power Hall Scott Engines, which were originally built for the Russian Government. It also purchased a D.H.6, Vickers Super marine Channel type of seaplane. The New Zealand Government donated six Avro 504 K's (Gnome engines), three sets of sea plane floats, and two D.H.9s after the Armistice.

On 16 December 1919 the School ran the first official Air Mail in New Zealand from Auckland to Dargaville, with George Bolt as pilot and Leo Walsh as passenger.

The School also made the first flight from Auckland to Wellington in October 1921, again with George Bolt piloting and Leo Walsh as passenger.

Vivian Walsh's health worsened and by 1919 he gave up flying to run the school with brother Leo. With WWI over it seemed there was little need for the New Zealand Flying School, but the Bettington Report (1919) recommended that this school and the Canterbury Aviation Company's flying school remain be maintained. in 1920 the government voted to give £25,000 to keep the school open, approximately $3.1 million today, but the School saw little of that money.

Without the need for pilots for the Royal Flying Corp, and with little government funding, the financial burden became difficult to manage. The Walsh brothers offered pleasure and charter flights to fund the school but by 1923 were unable to maintain operation costs and asked the New Zealand government to purchase the school. In October 1924 the government bought the schools assets for £10,500 and transferred the school to Hobsonville, which did not give any return to investors. The disappointed Walsh brothers gave up aviation and returned to their engineering business upon sale of the school.

== Aircraft ==
- Avro 504 K & L
- Boeing Model 1 - 2 planes acquired in 1919; first product for Boeing
- Caudron Type F
- Curtiss Model F
- Airco DH.6 - one example, damaged by gale August 1920 and not repaired
- Supermarine Channel I
- Walsh Brothers Flying Boats

== In film ==
- Wings on the Waitemata (1993) is a documentary which includes historical footage of the Walsh brothers' flying school.
- Auckland from the Skies (1918) is a film that captures the action at the Walsh Brothers Flying School from the ground and with aerial footage.

== Gallery ==
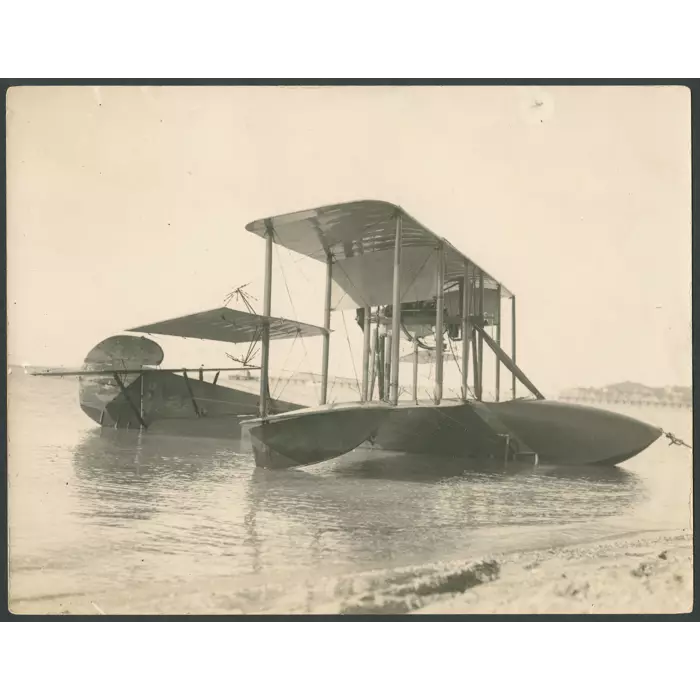
Walsh Brothers Seaplane

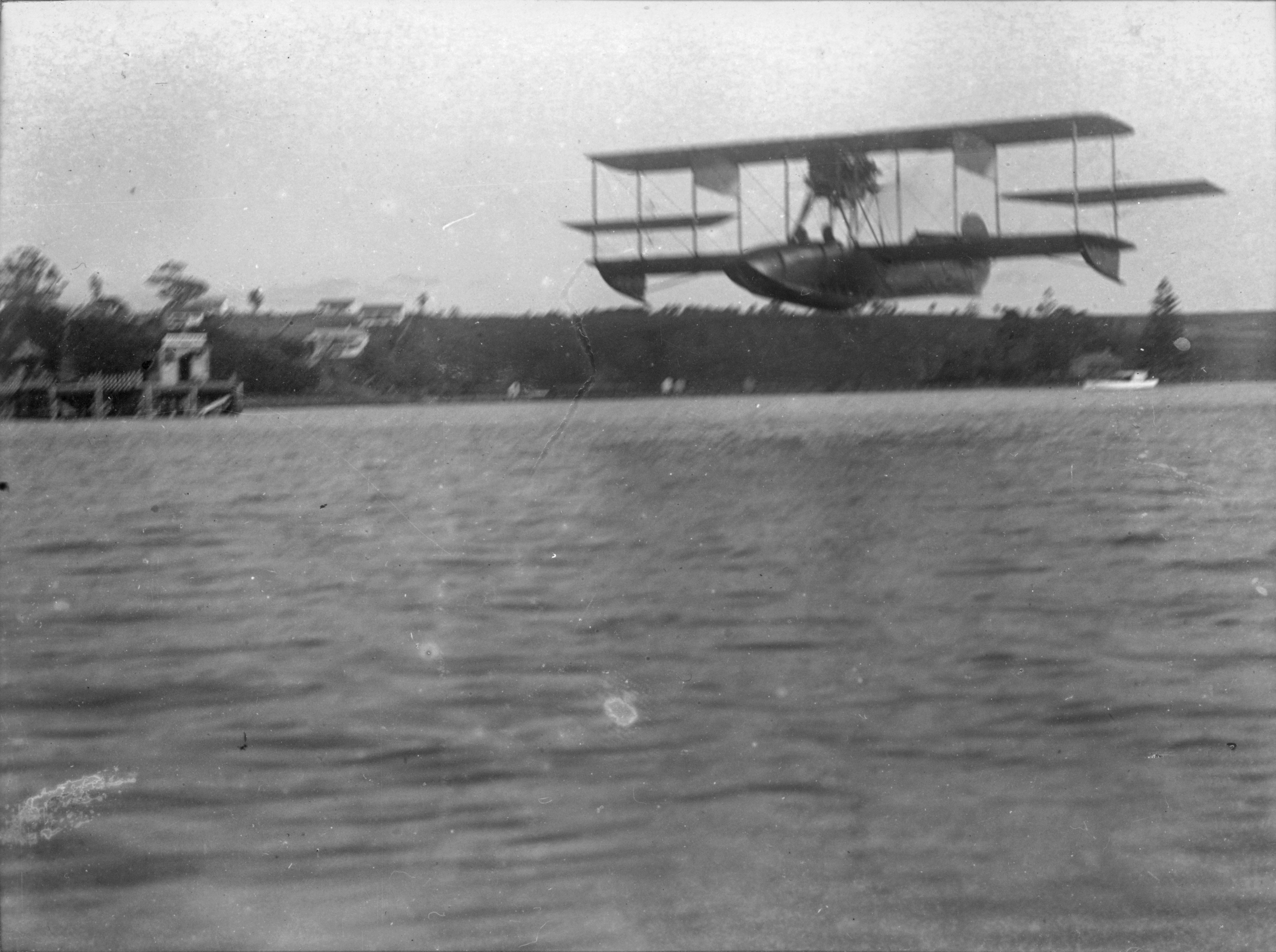
New Zealand Flying School Curtiss flying boat

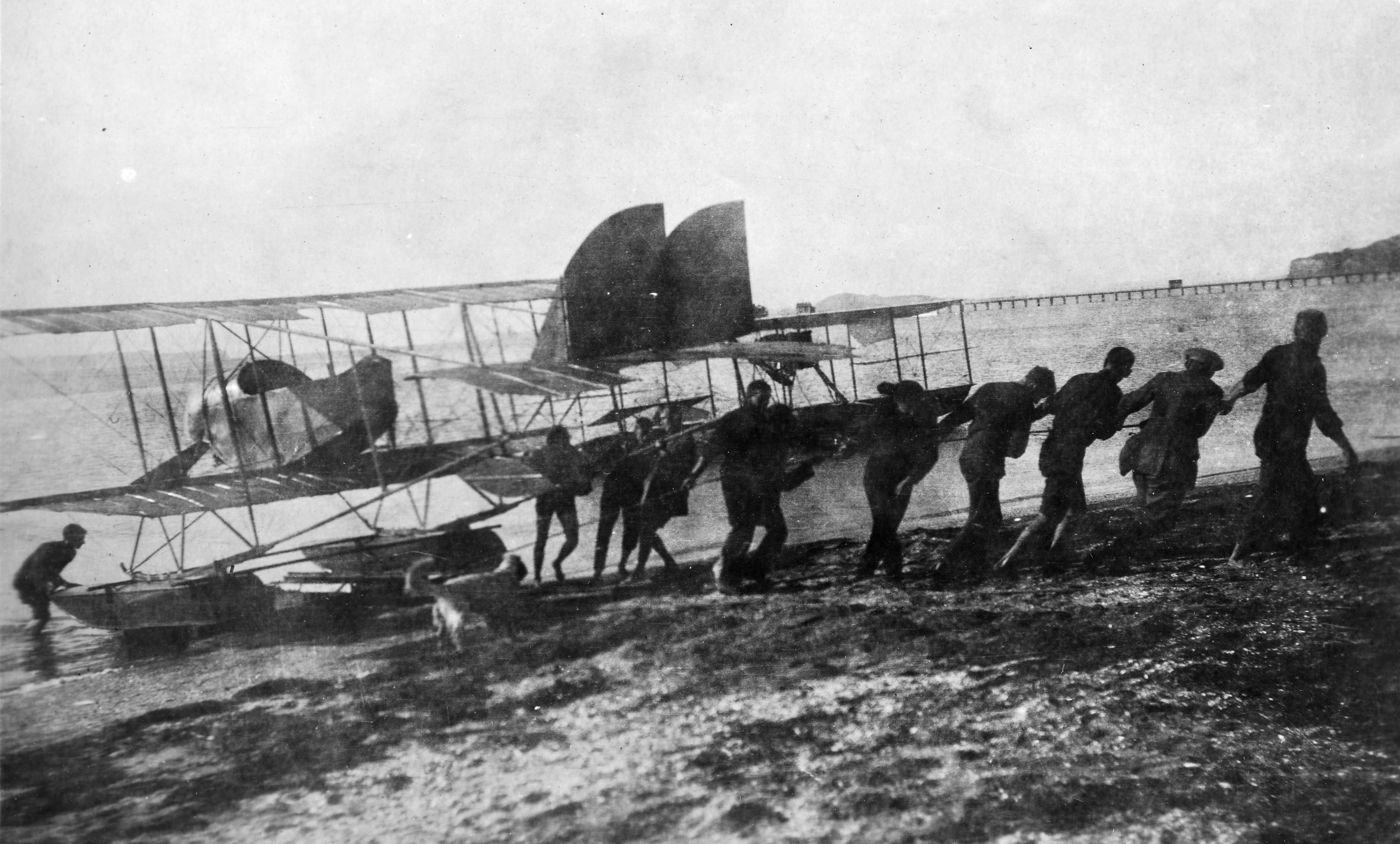
New Zealand Flying School staff and students hauling up the Caudron float plane. Kohimarama, 1916.

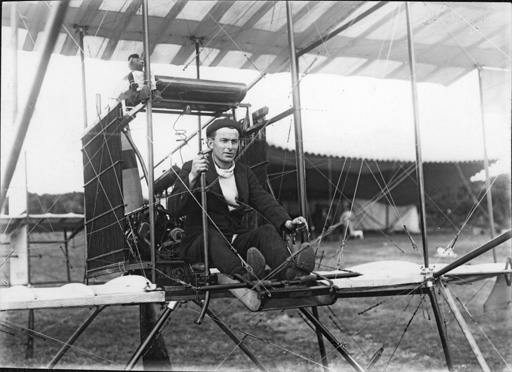
Manurewa No. 1, close up with Vivian Walsh at controls on ground

== See also ==
- George Bolt
- Keith Caldwell
- Henry Wigram
- Vivian Walsh (aviator)
- Walsh Brothers Flying Boats
