= Leo Walsh (footballer) =

Australian rules footballer

Personal information
- Full name: Leo Francis Walsh
- Born: 4 March 1900; Kensington, Victoria
- Died: 25 April 1981 (aged 81); Caulfield South, Victoria

Playing career^{1}
Years	Club	Games (Goals)
1920	St Kilda	3 (0)
- ^{1} Playing statistics correct to the end of 1920.

Leo Francis Walsh (4 March 1900 – 25 April 1981) was an Australian rules footballer who played with St Kilda in the Victorian Football League (VFL).
