= Ōkahu Bay =

Bay along Tāmaki Drive, Auckland, New Zealand

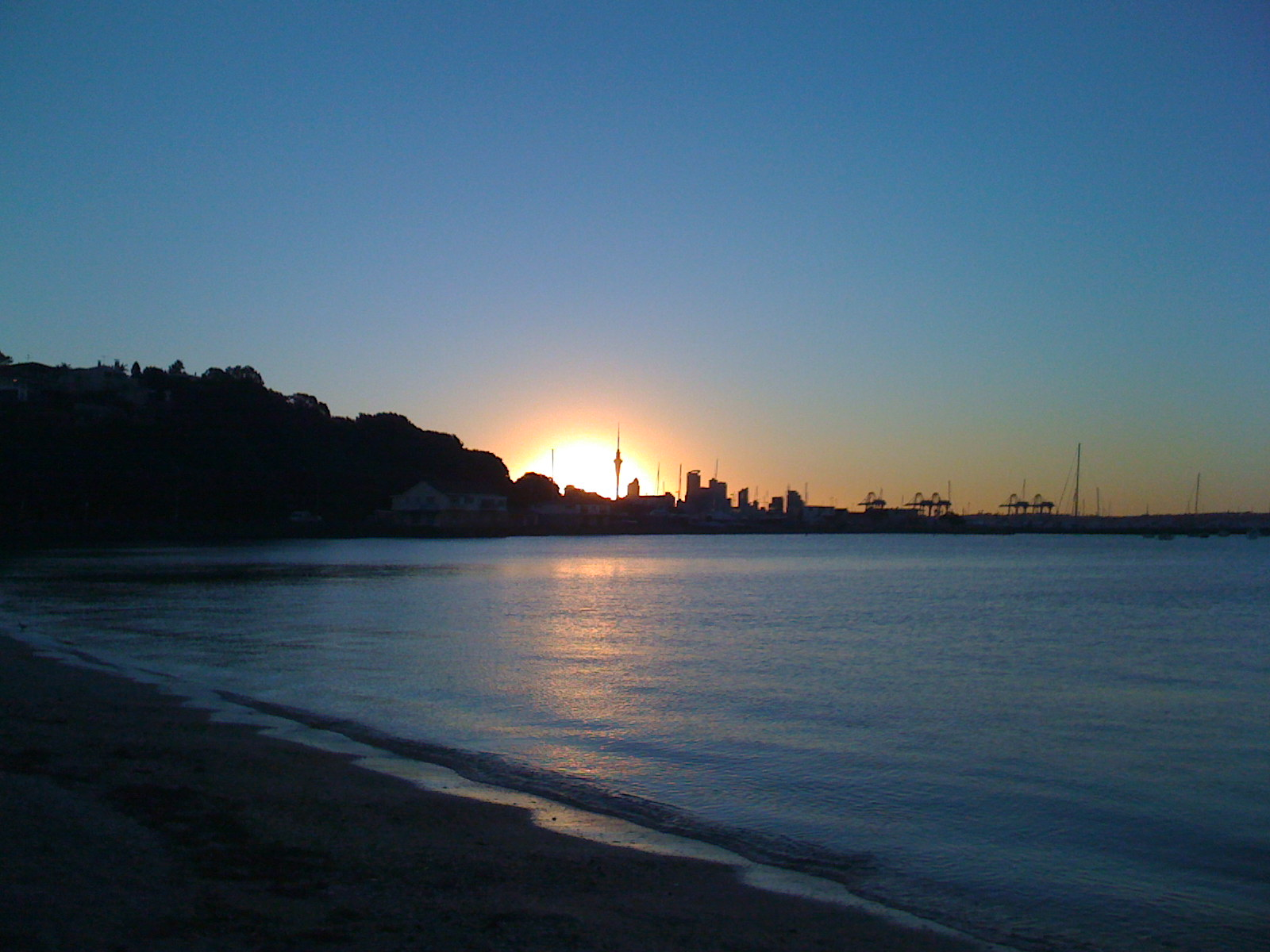
- View of Ōkahu Bay at sunset, looking towards the Sky Tower

- Location within the Auckland region
- Location: Auckland Region, New Zealand
- Coordinates: 36.848°S 174.813°E
- Ocean/sea sources: Pacific Ocean
- Settlements: Ōrākei

Ōkahu Bay is a bay along Tāmaki Drive, Auckland, New Zealand. It is the ancestral land of Ngāti Whātua Ōrākei and owned by Ngāti Whatua and co-managed by the Auckland Council.

== Naming ==
The name Okahu Bay comes from the Māori Ōkahu, meaning "the dwelling place of Kahumatamomoe".

== History ==
Ōkahu Bay is part of the Ōrākei ancestral land of Ngāti Whātua. In 1869 a Native Land Court Declaration alienated the land from all but thirteen owners, effectively stripping Ngāti Whātua of the land.
