= Achilles (disambiguation) =

Achilles is the name of a Greek mythological hero of the Trojan War.

Achilles or Achilleus may also refer to:

== Science and medicine ==
- Achilles tendon, the posterior tendon of the leg
- 588 Achilles, the first Trojan asteroid to be discovered

== Fiction ==
- Achilleis (trilogy), a trilogy of plays by Aeschylus
- Achilles (Marvel Comics), a member of the fictional group the Pantheon in the Marvel universe
- Olympian (character), whose second DC Comics incarnation is that of the Greek hero Achilles
- Achilles de Flandres, a villain in Orson Scott Card's Ender's Game novel series
- Achilles, Phoebus' horse in the animated film The Hunchback of Notre Dame

== Music ==
- Achilles (opera), a 1733 ballad opera by John Gay
- Achilleus a 1886 secular oratorio by Max Bruch
- Achilles (band), an American hardcore band
- "Achilles", song by Jag Panzer from the album Casting the Stones, 2004

== Places ==
- Achilles, Kansas, US, a ghost town
- Achilles, Virginia, US, an unincorporated community
- Achilles Peak, a mountain in New Zealand
- Achilles Point, a headland in Auckland, New Zealand

== People ==
- Saints Nereus and Achilleus, 2nd century Christian saints and martyrs
- Achilles Tatius of Alexandria, 2nd century Greek writer
- Felix, Fortunatus, and Achilleus (died 212), Christian saints and martyrs
- Achilles or Achillius of Larissa (died 330), Christian saint
- Achilleus (Roman usurper), the ruler of Egypt for a short time in the late 3rd century AD
- Achilles (judge royal) (died after 1201), Hungarian noble
- Achilles Alferaki (1846–1919), Russian-Greek composer and mayor
- Achilleus Kewanuka (1869–1886), Ugandan Christian saint and martyr
- Frederick Achilles, Duke of Württemberg-Neuenstadt (1591–1631)
- Achilles Schucan, (died 1927) Swiss engineer
- Kullervo Achilles Manner (1880–1939), Finnish politician and journalist
- Theodore Achilles (1905–1986), American diplomat

== Transport ==
- Achilles (automobile), a British automobile maker, 1903–1908
- Achilles (1906–1912 motorcycle), a Czechoslovak motorcycle manufacturer
- Achilles (1873–1892), one of the ten South Devon Railway Buffalo class steam locomotives
- Achilles, one of the GWR 3031 Class locomotives that were built for and run on Great Western Railway between 1891 and 1915
- SS Achilles (1866) was one of the first steamships that were fuel efficient enough to trade between the UK and China.

== Military ==
- HMS Achilles, seven Royal Navy ships
- HMNZS Achilles, New Zealand Navy cruiser, 1932–1948
- USS Achilles, two US Navy ships
- 17pdr SP M10C Achilles and 3in SP M10 Achilles, British variants of the M10, a World War II tank destroyer
- Chilean ship Aquiles, four ships of the Chilean Navy with the name in Spanish
- The "Achilles" drone battalion of Ukraine's 92nd Assault Brigade

== Sport ==
- Achilles '29, a Dutch football club based in Groesbeek
- Achilles F.C., an English football club based in Ipswich
- Achilles Athletics Club, a club in Mombasa, Kenya, founded and run by coach Ray Batchelor in the 1950s
- Achilles Club, an English a track and field club
- Achilles International, an international non-profit organization which provides support to athletes with disabilities

== See also ==
- Acanthurus achilles, commonly known as Achilles tang or Achilles surgeonfish, a species of tropical marine fish
- Achille (disambiguation)
- Achillea, the yarrows, a genus of flowering plants in the family Asteraceae
- Achilles' heel, a weakness or vulnerability
- Achilles number, a powerful number which is not a perfect power
- Achilleos, a surname
- †Archicebus achilles, an extinct species of primate
- Borgå Akilles, a Finnish sports club based in Provoo
- Morpho achilles, the Achilles morpho, blue-banded morpho, or banded blue morpho, a species of Neotropical butterfly
- Phyllonorycter achilleus, a species of moth from the family Gracillariidae
- Z Achilles and Turbo Achilles, "Beyblades" from the anime and toyline Beyblade Burst Turbo
