= Achilli =

Achilli is an Italian surname. Notable people with the surname include:

- Camillo Achilli (1921–1998), Italian footballer
- Giacinto Achilli (1803–1860), Italian discharged priest
- Justin Achilli, writer associated with White Wolf, Inc. American games company
- Marco Achilli (1948–2009), Italian footballer
- Romain Achilli (born 1993), French footballer

== See also ==
- Achilles (disambiguation)
- Achille (disambiguation)
- Achillini
