= Achillini =

Achillini is an Italian surname. People with this surname include:

- Alessandro Achillini (1463–1512), Italian philosopher and physician; brother of Giovanni and great-uncle of Claudio
- Claudio Achillini (1574–1640), Italian philosopher, theologian, mathematician, poet, and jurist; great-nephew of Alessandro and Giovanni
- Giovanni Filoteo Achillini (1466–1538), Italian philosopher and antiquarian; brother of Alessandro and great-uncle of Claudio

== See also ==
- Achilli
