= St Heliers =

- Suburb
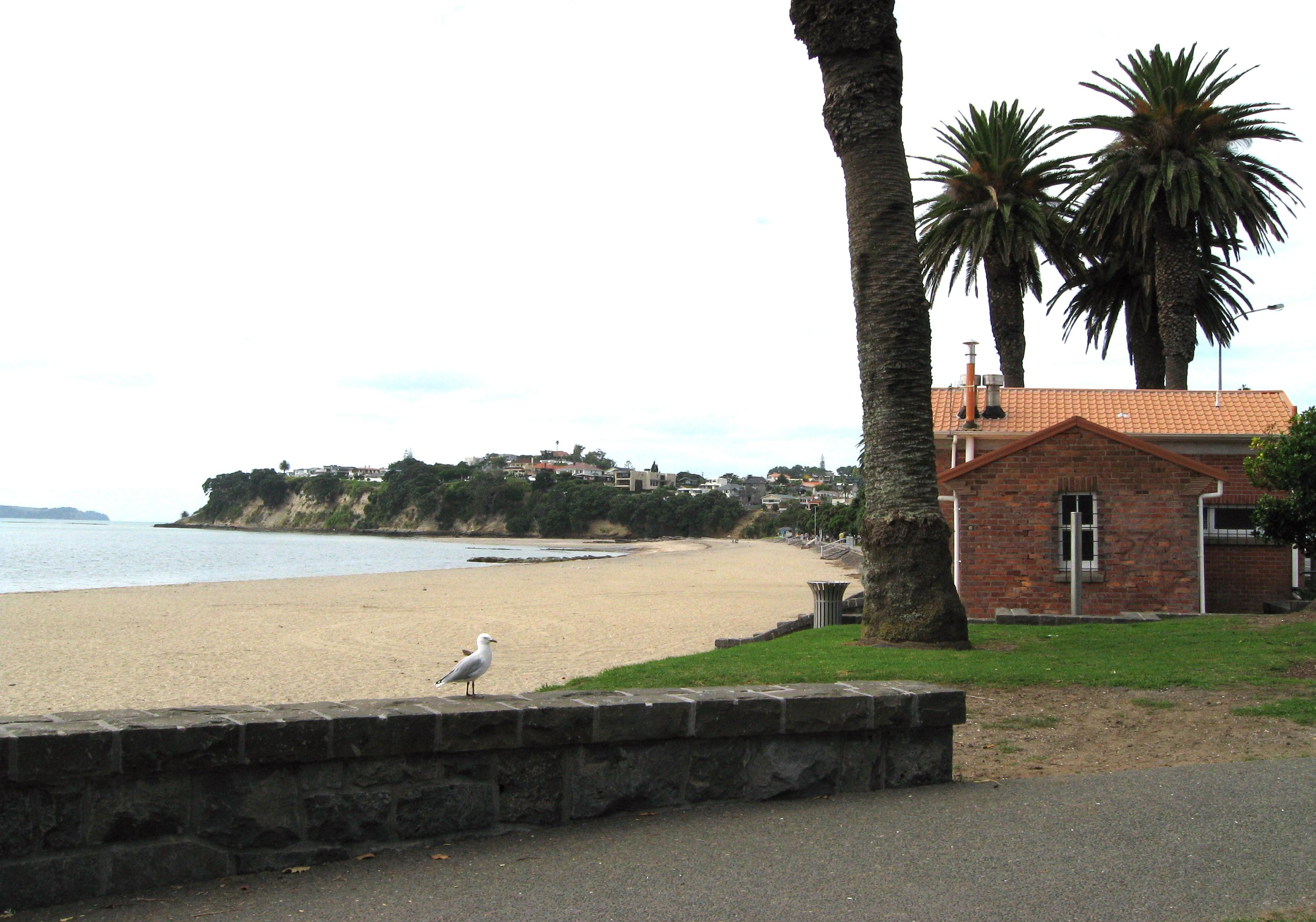
- View of St Heliers Beach towards Achilles Point
- Interactive map of St Heliers
- Coordinates: 36°51′S 174°52′E
- Country: New Zealand
- City: Auckland
- Local authority: Auckland Council
- Electoral ward: Ōrākei ward
- Local board: Ōrākei Local Board

Area
  - Land: 375 ha (930 acres)

Population (June 2025)
  - Total: 11,760
  - Density: 3,140/km^{2} (8,120/sq mi)

Ōrākei	(Hauraki Gulf); Rangitoto Island	Motukorea
Kohimarama; Mission Bay	St Heliers	Glendowie
Saint Johns	Glen Innes	Wai o Taiki Bay

St Heliers is a seaside suburb of Auckland with a population of 11,760 as of June 2025.

St Heliers is located at the eastern end of Tamaki Drive, and used to be the place where the Tamaki estuary formally divided Auckland from Manukau City, until the entire Auckland region was amalgamated under a single city authority, the Auckland Council, in 2010. Local government of St Heliers is the responsibility of the Ōrākei Local Board, which also covers the suburbs of Ōrākei, Kohimarama, Mission Bay, Glendowie, St Johns, Meadowbank, Remuera and Ellerslie.

== Demographics ==
Saint Heliers (the name used by Stats NZ) covers 3.75 km^{2} (1.45 sq mi) and had an estimated population of 11,760 as of June 2025 with a population density of 3,136 people per km^{2}.

Historical population
Year	Pop.	±% p.a.
2006	10,584	—
2013	10,998	+0.55%
2018	11,526	+0.94%
2023	11,436	−0.16%

Saint Heliers had a population of 11,436 in the 2023 New Zealand census, a decrease of 90 people (−0.8%) since the 2018 census, and an increase of 438 people (4.0%) since the 2013 census. There were 5,430 males, 5,979 females and 27 people of other genders in 4,392 dwellings. 2.6% of people identified as LGBTIQ+. The median age was 45.7 years (compared with 38.1 years nationally). There were 1,956 people (17.1%) aged under 15 years, 1,785 (15.6%) aged 15 to 29, 5,211 (45.6%) aged 30 to 64, and 2,481 (21.7%) aged 65 or older.

People could identify as more than one ethnicity. The results were 80.6% European (Pākehā); 4.5% Māori; 2.4% Pasifika; 16.1% Asian; 3.2% Middle Eastern, Latin American and African New Zealanders (MELAA); and 1.7% other, which includes people giving their ethnicity as "New Zealander". English was spoken by 96.9%, Māori language by 0.7%, Samoan by 0.2%, and other languages by 22.4%. No language could be spoken by 1.2% (e.g. too young to talk). New Zealand Sign Language was known by 0.2%. The percentage of people born overseas was 37.0, compared with 28.8% nationally.

Religious affiliations were 38.8% Christian, 1.2% Hindu, 0.7% Islam, 0.1% Māori religious beliefs, 1.2% Buddhist, 0.2% New Age, 0.7% Jewish, and 1.0% other religions. People who answered that they had no religion were 50.2%, and 5.9% of people did not answer the census question.

Of those at least 15 years old, 4,578 (48.3%) people had a bachelor's or higher degree, 3,603 (38.0%) had a post-high school certificate or diploma, and 1,299 (13.7%) people exclusively held high school qualifications. The median income was $60,100, compared with $41,500 nationally. 2,856 people (30.1%) earned over $100,000 compared to 12.1% nationally. The employment status of those at least 15 was that 4,725 (49.8%) people were employed full-time, 1,494 (15.8%) were part-time, and 186 (2.0%) were unemployed.

Individual statistical areas
Name	Area (km^{2})	Population	Density (per km^{2})	Dwellings	Median age	Median income
Saint Heliers North	1.34	3,810	2,843	1,527	48.4 years	$60,500
Saint Heliers West	1.19	3,627	3,048	1,380	45.6 years	$62,100
Saint Heliers South	1.22	4,002	3,280	1,485	43.1 years	$58,000
New Zealand					38.1 years	$41,500

== History ==
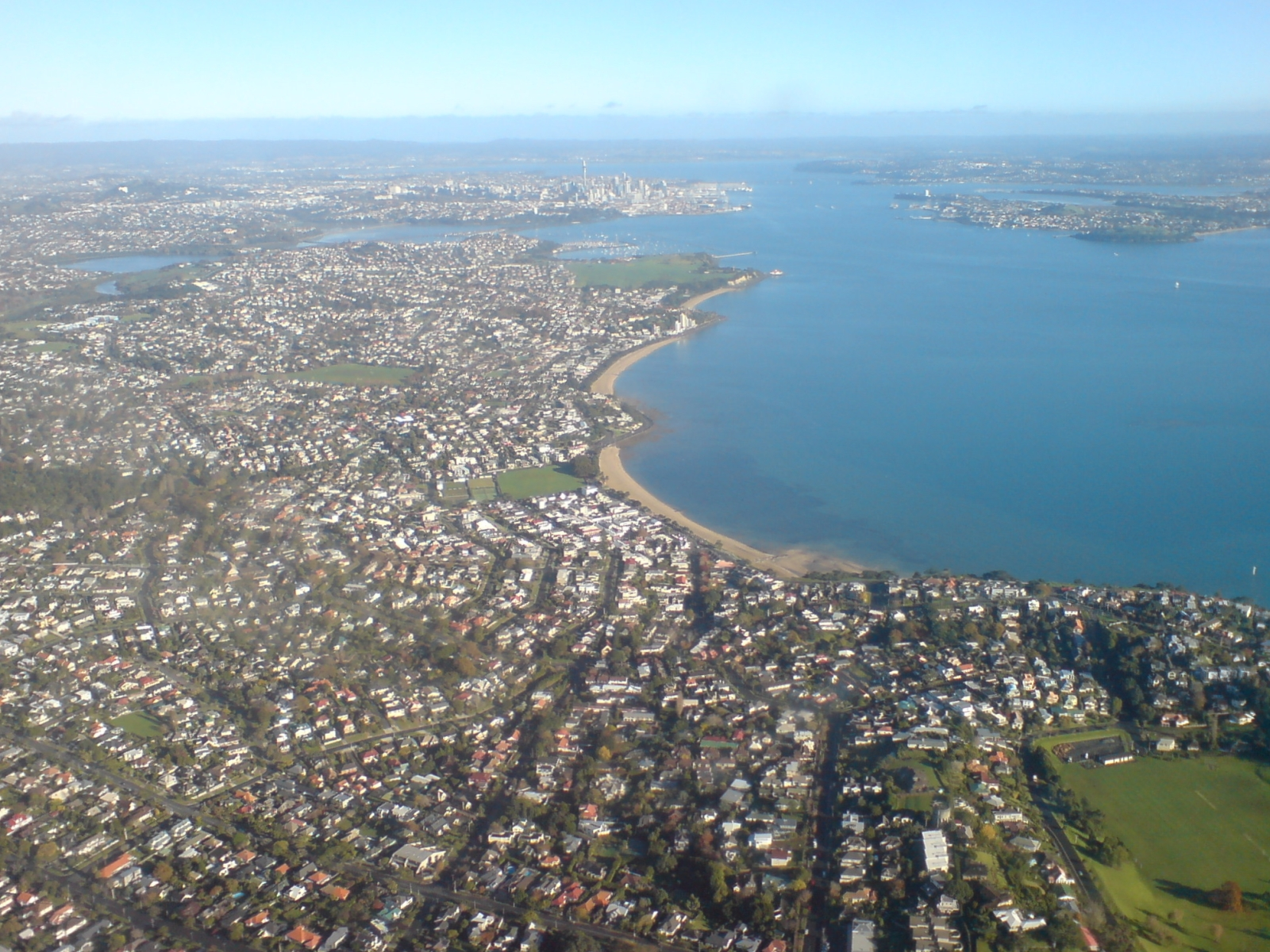
Looking westwards over St Heliers (foreground) and the other eastern beaches to the CBD in the distance

=== Pre-European history ===
The area around Glover Park and Achilles Point was named Te Pane o Horoiwi ("The Head of Horoiwi") by Tainui iwi. The name refers to the place where Horoiwi, one of the migrants aboard to Tainui waka, settled with his family in approximately the 13th century. Te Pane o Horoiwi pā was located at the end of The Rise, at the high point of the tuff ring of Whakamuhu / Glover Park, an extinct volcano. Te Waiohua iwi traces its origin to a mingling of the people who first inhabited the area with members of Tainui who settled the area, such as Horoiwi. Around 1750, Ngāti Whātua expanded their territory further into Tāmaki Makaurau, displacing Te Waiohua. Ngāti Whātua gifted the land to Ngāti Pāoa in the late 1700s. The area was abandoned in the 1820s due to raids by Ngāpuhi during the Musket Wars, however people returned to the area by the late 1830s.

=== European settlement ===
The area around St Heliers was a part of the Kohimarama Block, which was purchased by the British crown from Ngāti Pāoa in 1841. European settlement began on the north-facing slopes of St Heliers bay, with the establishment of the Glen Orchard homestead, believed to have been built in the 1850s. The building was recognised as a place of historic, architectural and social significance by Heritage New Zealand in October 2010. This Regency-style residence incorporates Italianate influences, and has a grand and elegant appearance. Glen Orchard is a historic example of a prosperous rural homestead, and is linked to the settlers who comprised Auckland's early elite. It is known as the residence of Lieutenant-General William Taylor (1790–1868), and his son Charles John Taylor, who married into the family of the fourth New Zealand Premier, Alfred Domett. William Taylor was a retired senior officer of the East India Company’s Madras Army.

In 1879 Glen Orchard became Auckland’s first stud farm, managed by Major Walmsley, who suggested the name St Heliers Bay, supposedly because it reminded him of the fashionable holiday resort Bay of Saint Helier in Jersey, one of Britain’s Channel Islands. In the mid-1880s the homestead became the centre piece of a planned model seaside suburb that was the foundation of present day St Heliers.

=== Residential development ===
In November 1881 St Heliers Bay was bought by the St Heliers and Northcote Land Company. The aim of this company was to make the land available for residential development. The company realised the area would be more attractive for potential future buyers if St Heliers’ connections to the Auckland's town centre were improved. At that time St Heliers was usually reached by boat, the trip from Auckland taking only 30 minutes, whereas the 13 kilometres (8.1 mi) land route via Newmarket, Remuera and Meadowbank was usually much more onerous. During this period St Heliers was a centre for local farmers and the location of the villas of a few rich business people. Despite advertisements in The New Zealand Herald land sales were poor and the company's scheme failed.

The advertisement indicates the need for better transport links. The St Heliers and Northcote Land Company built a 460m (1500 foot) pier at St Heliers in 1882 before becoming insolvent. However, the tramway connection to Auckland was never realised . By 1890 St Heliers had become a popular waterfront destination for day trippers, with excursions running from Auckland and Thames. Moonlight excursions from Auckland were especially popular. For this particular excursion the Eagle and Osprey boats were used, since they allowed dancing on board.

After Tamaki Drive was opened in 1932, St Heliers became a commuter suburb and a destination for Sunday drives.

== Landmarks and features ==
=== Achilles Point ===
Achilles Point is regarded as the rocky promontory on the east side of Ladies Bay, but the name can also indicate the whole headland between St Heliers and the Tamaki River estuary. It offers great views of the Waitematā Harbour, and the Gulf Islands. In 1940 it was named Achilles Point in honour of the New Zealand battleship HMS Achilles and her crew. The Achilles opened fire on the German cruiser Admiral Graf Spee in the South Atlantic on 13 December 1939. In doing so she became the first New Zealand unit to strike a blow at the enemy in World War II, and the first New Zealand warship to take part in a naval battle. This confrontation off Argentina was later called Battle of the River Plate,

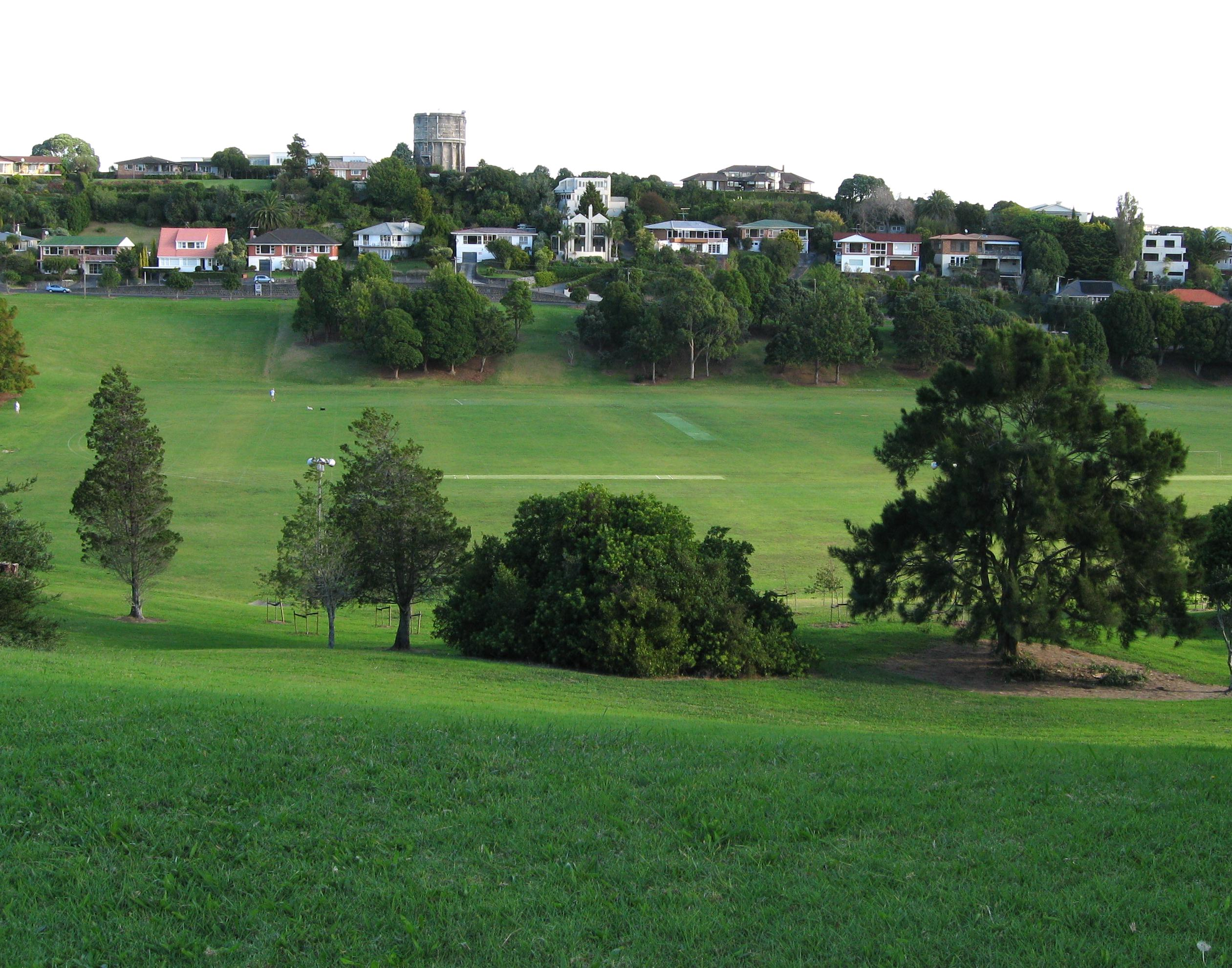
Glover Park

the first major naval engagement of World War II, during which the Achilles, defeated the Admiral Graf Spee.

=== Parks ===
==== Dingle Dell Reserve ====
Dingle Dell was first established as a reserve in the 1880s. Dingle Dell was part of Major Thomas Bunbury's four farms, which he bought in 1842. It became a public reserve in 1930 and is now owned and managed by the Auckland Council, after which native trees were planted in the reserve. By the 1950s, Dingle Dell Reserve was described as the forgotten "Cinderella of Auckland's Parks" in The New Zealand Herald. Today it is still a peaceful area located in the heart of St. Heliers, where people can enjoy a picnic or bush walk. The park hosts, amongst others, the native plants kohekohe and tanekaha.

==== Glover Park ====
St Heliers has one relatively unknown volcano, a maar of unknown age. Its crater had formed a swamp by the time European settlers arrived in the area. On the seaward side, a Māori defended settlement pā once stood, and the landward side is marked by the water tower at its highest point. The Auckland City Council acquired the land in the 1930s and in 1953 half the area was drained and consolidated. In the same year the Tamaki Ex-Servicemen's Women's Auxiliary planted trees to commemorate the men of the district who had lost their lives during World War I and II. Unfortunately the drainage project of 1953 proved a failure because the area remained unstable and susceptible to flooding. Additional drainage in 1959 made the park safe, and allowed the area to be converted into the sports fields of Glover Park. It is unclear whether the trees that were planted in 1953 are still the same trees present in Glover Park today.

== Statues, Memorials and Sculptures ==
- St Heliers Memorial Fountain
- St Heliers War Memorial

== Events ==
Weet-Bix Kids TRYathlon Park – New Zealand's first triathlon for children was held at St Heliers in 1992 and attracted approximately 500 participants. Children compete over distances starting with a 50-metre swim, 4-kilometre cycle and 1-kilometre run. Since 1992 this event has grown considerably with 20,000 children competing in one of the 13 TRYathlons around the country in 2013.

Round The Bays Fun Run – This annual event is the result of the international running boom of the 1970s and 1980s, during which millions of people took up running. The Auckland Round the Bays Fun Run is one of the largest in the world, and was initiated by the Auckland Joggers Club in the early 1970s. The run is 8.4 km long over Tamaki Drive, the flat road following the contours of the Waitematā Harbour, passing Hobson Bay, Okahu Bay, Mission Bay, Kohimarama Beach, and finishing in St Heliers Bay Reserve. Nowadays it is estimated that between 70,000 and 80,000 runners participate each year.

== Education ==
St Heliers School is a full primary school (years 1–8) with a roll of 608.

St Ignatius Catholic School is a state-integrated contributing primary school (years 1–6) with a roll of 203.

Both these schools are coeducational. Rolls are as of March 2026.

== Gallery ==
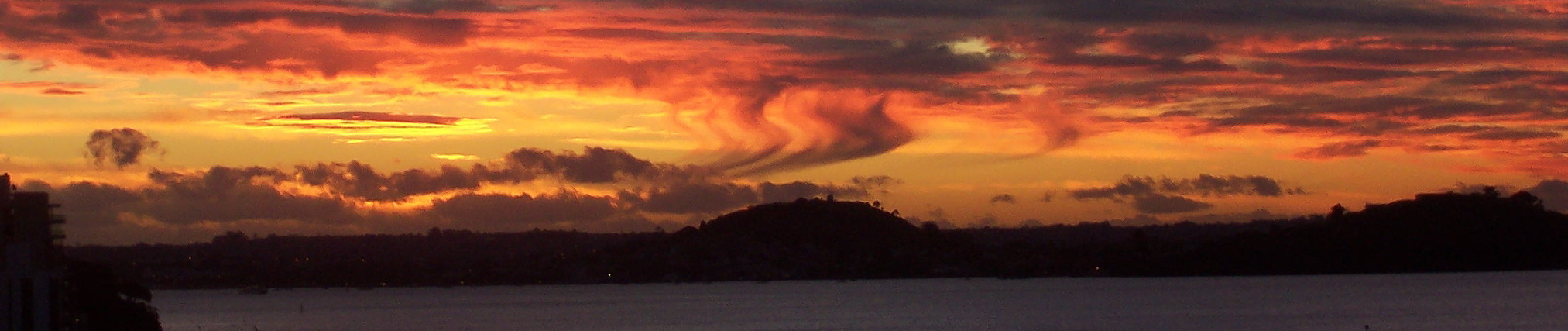
Waitematā Harbour at sunset, taken from the point between Kohimarama and St Heliers Beaches

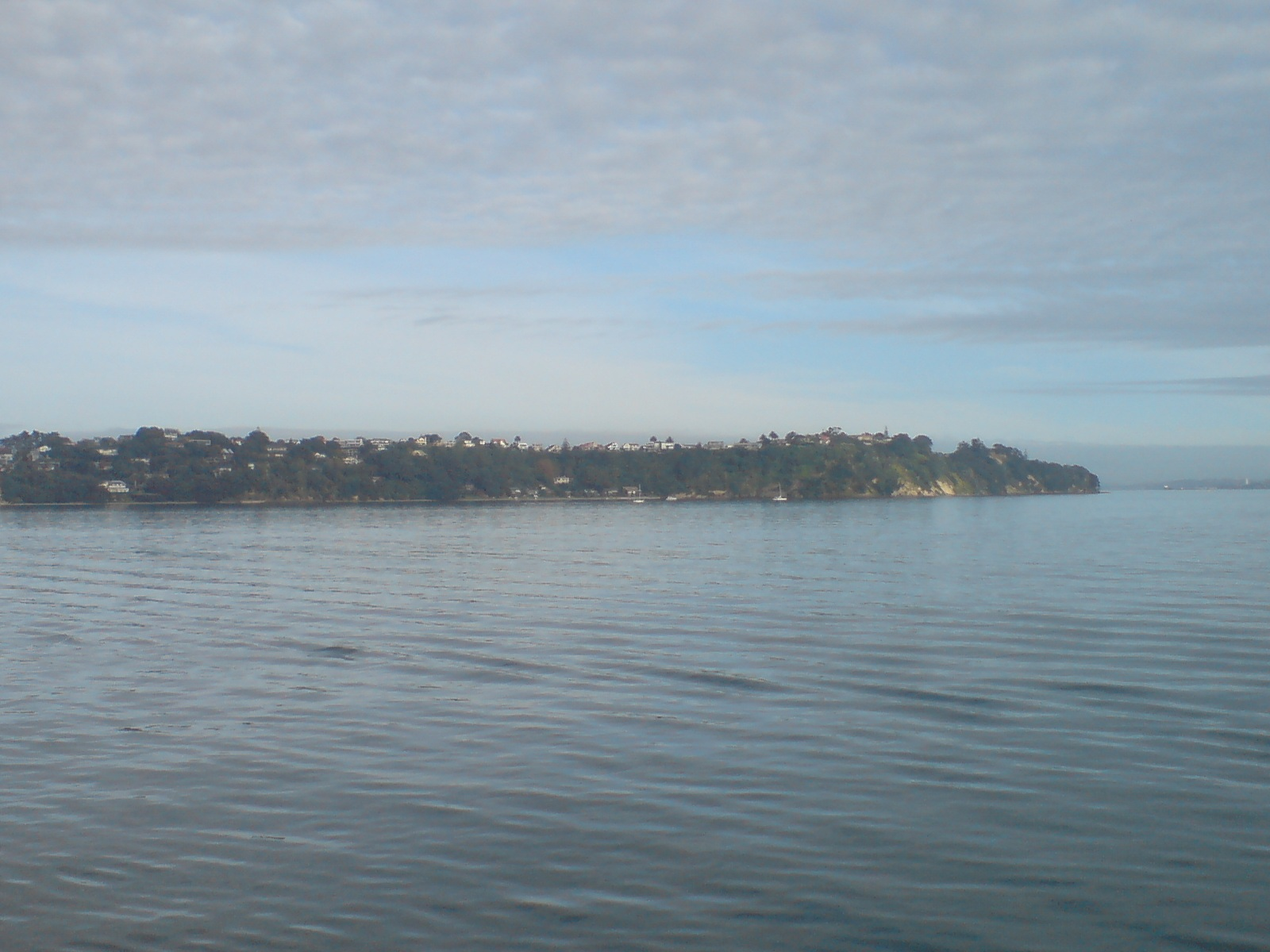
Waterview of St Heliers

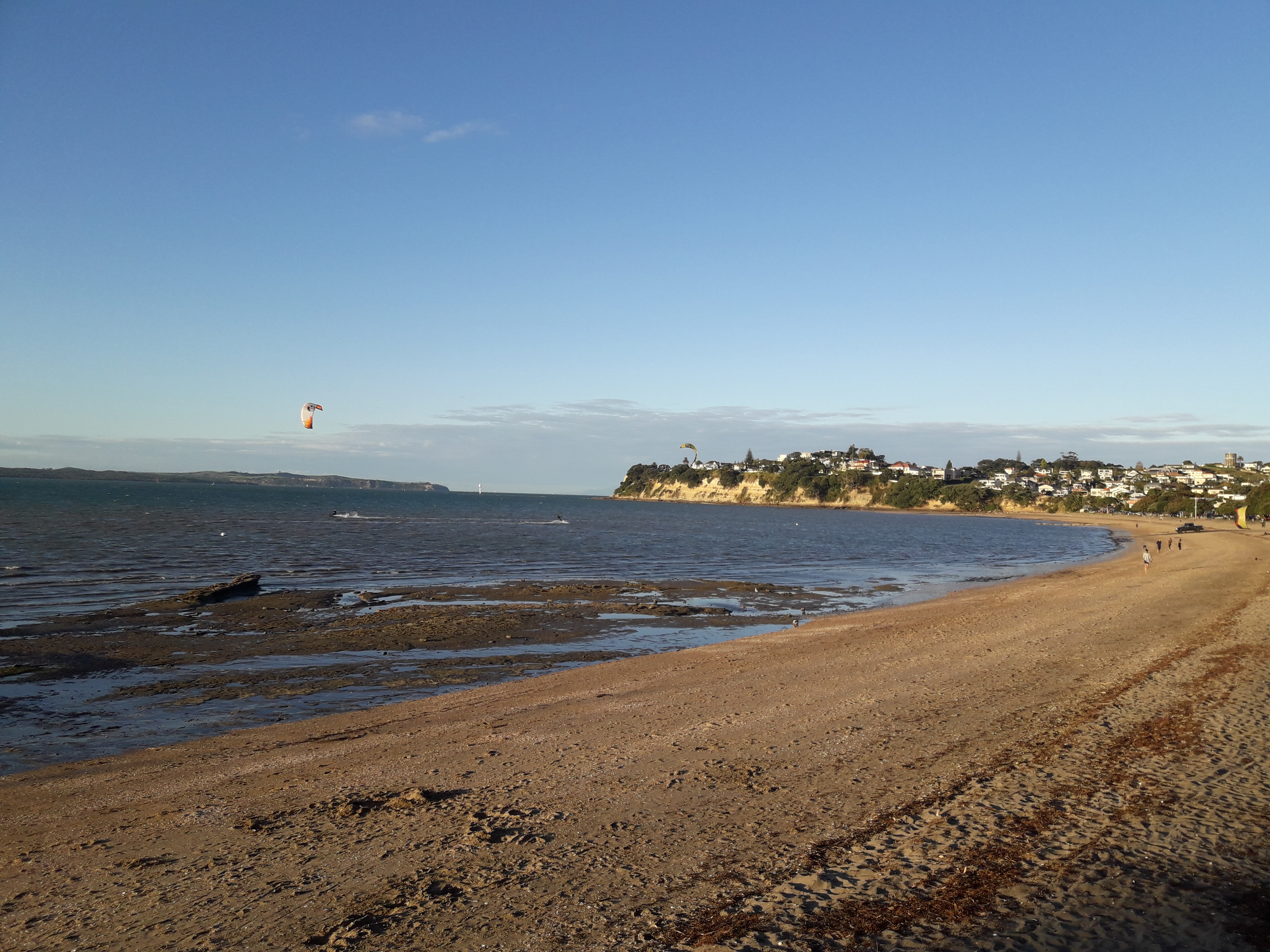
St Heliers Beach in Auckland

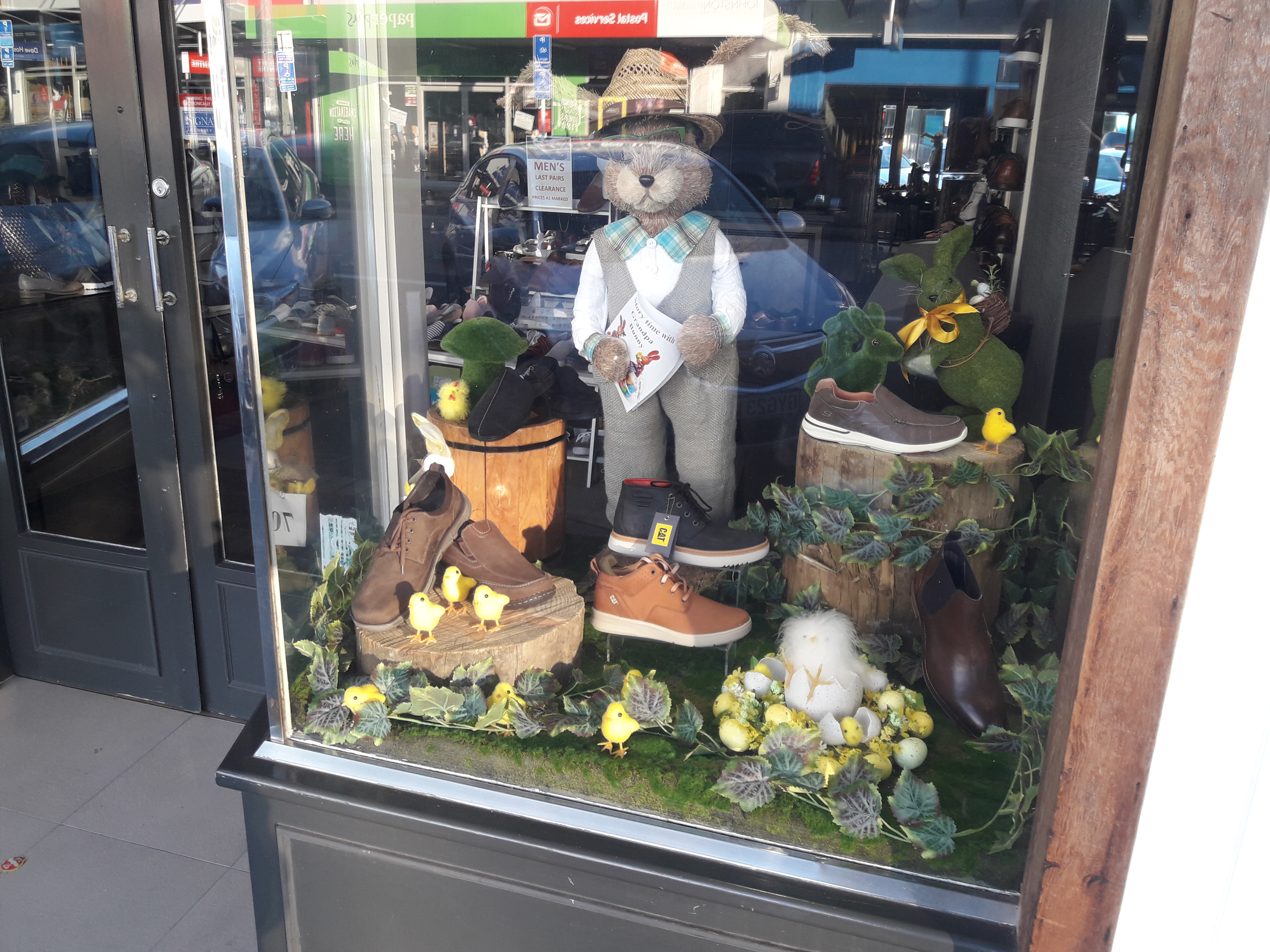
Shop window display of a shoe shop in St Heliers in Auckland

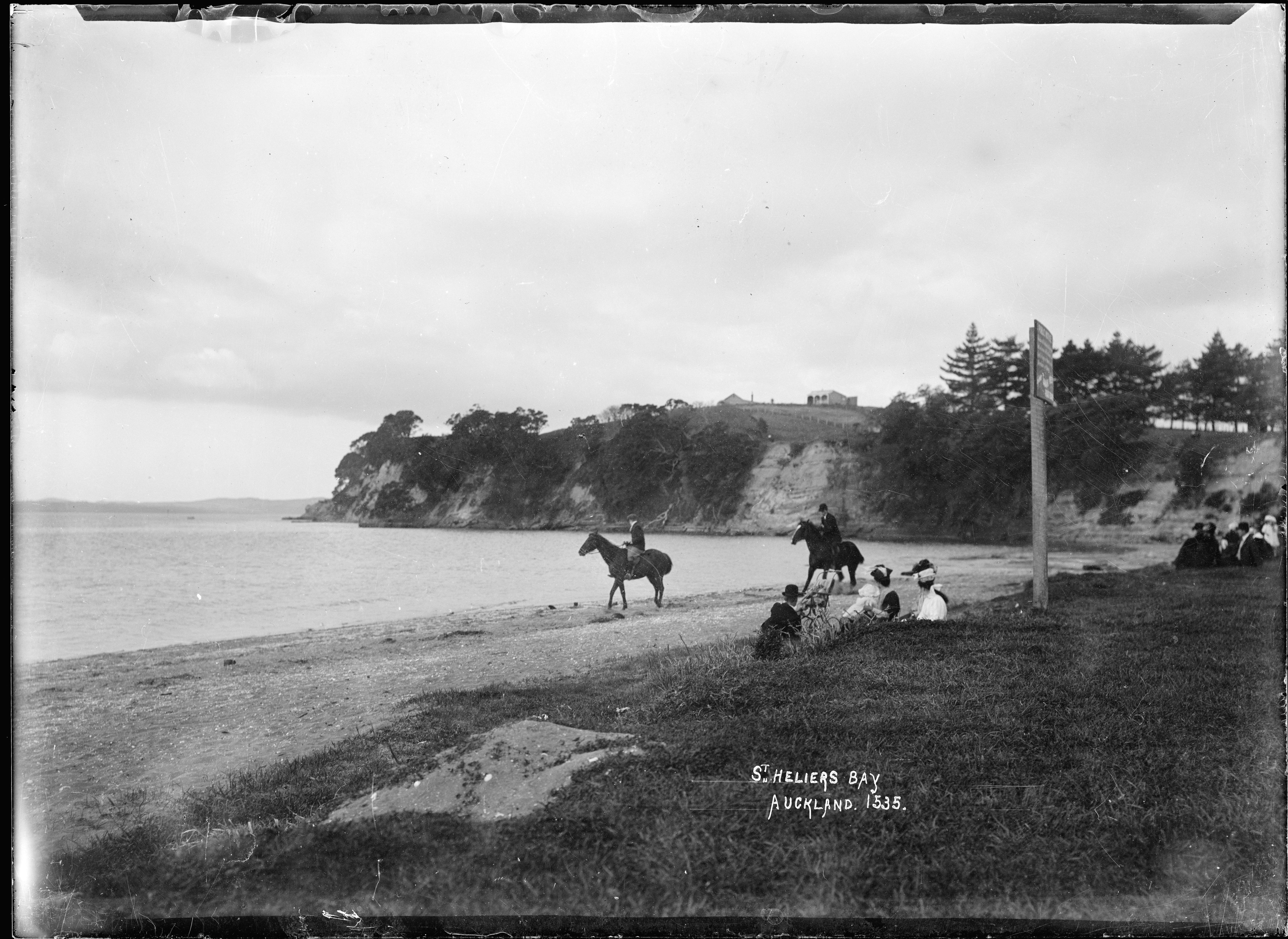
View of the eastern end of St Heliers Bay. Photographed by William Archer Price between 1910 and 1930.

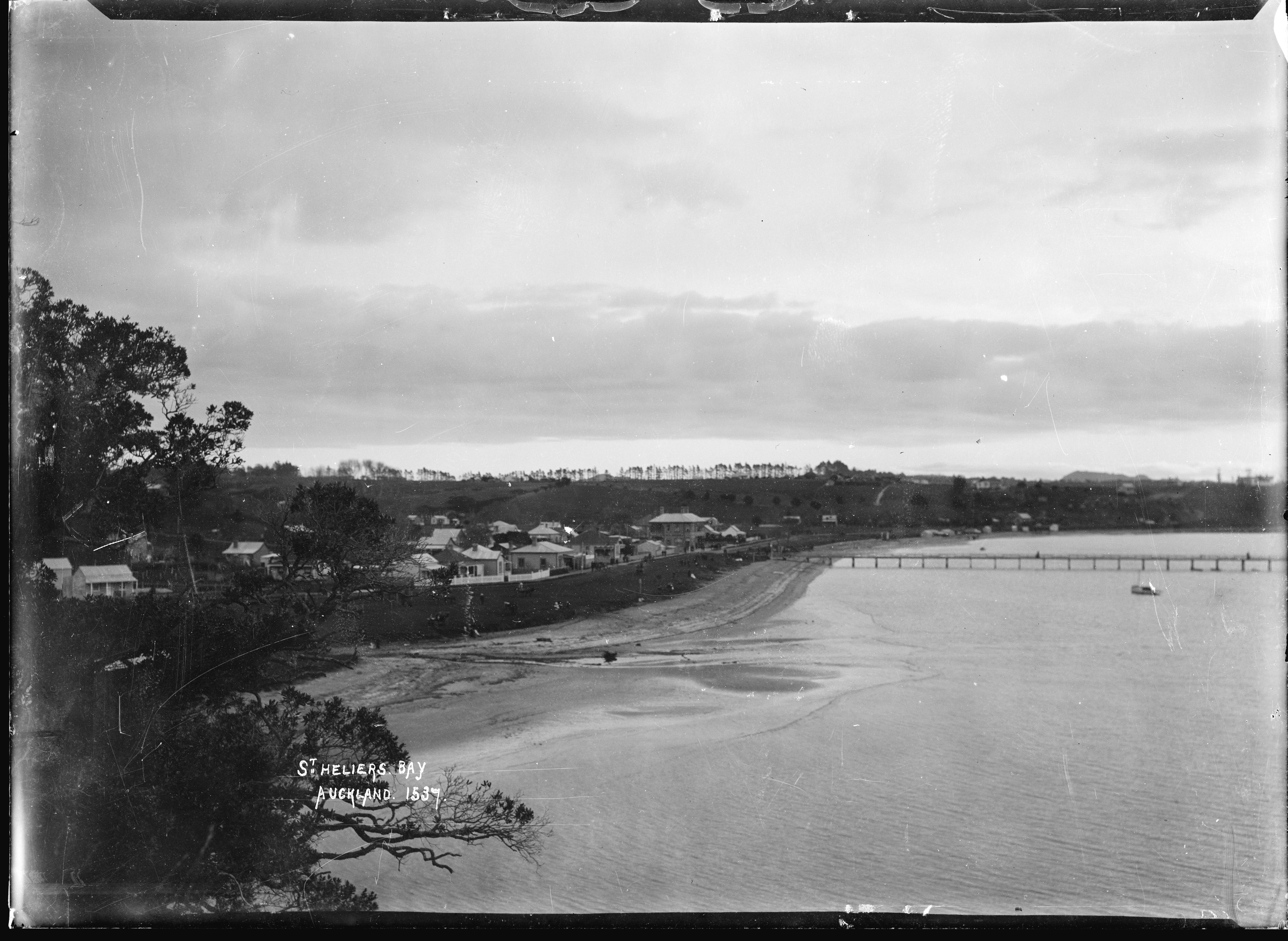
View of St Heliers Bay, Auckland, looking west. The wharf is in the middle distance. Photographed by William Archer Price between 1910 and 1930.
