= Achille (disambiguation) =

Achille is a masculine given name and occasionally a surname.

Achille may also refer to:

- HMS Achille, four ships of the Royal Navy
- French ship Achille, ten ships of the French Navy
- Achille, Oklahoma, United States, a town
- Philip Achille, 21st century UK harmonica player
- Achille (opera), an 1801 opera by Ferdinando Paer

== See also ==
- Achilles (disambiguation)
