= Chilean ship Aquiles =

Four ships of the Chilean Navy have been named Aquiles, in honour of the hero of Greek mythology Achilles:

- Aquiles (1825), originally a 20-gun brigantine acquired for the Spanish Navy at Bordeaux, France in 1819. She was captured by Chilean naval officer Pedro Angulo Novoa in 1825 and turned over to the Chilean government. Sank in a gale in Valparaíso in 1839.
- Aquiles (1890), port tugboat built in 1890 that served in Talcahuano until 1929, later being scrapped.
- Aquiles (1967), originally a transport built by Aalborg Shipyard, Denmark in 1952 for a Faroese company. She was acquired in 1967 and entered service in 1968. Decommissioned in 1988 and then sold to a private company in 1989.
- Aquiles (1987), transport built by the Chilean shipyard ASMAR in 1987 and commissioned in 1988, which is currently in service.

== See also ==
- Achilles (disambiguation)

== Bibliography ==
- Saunders, Stephen, ed. (2004). Jane's Fighting Ships 2004–2005. Coulsdon, UK: Jane's Information Group. ISBN 0-7106-2623-1.
