= St Heliers Memorial Fountain =

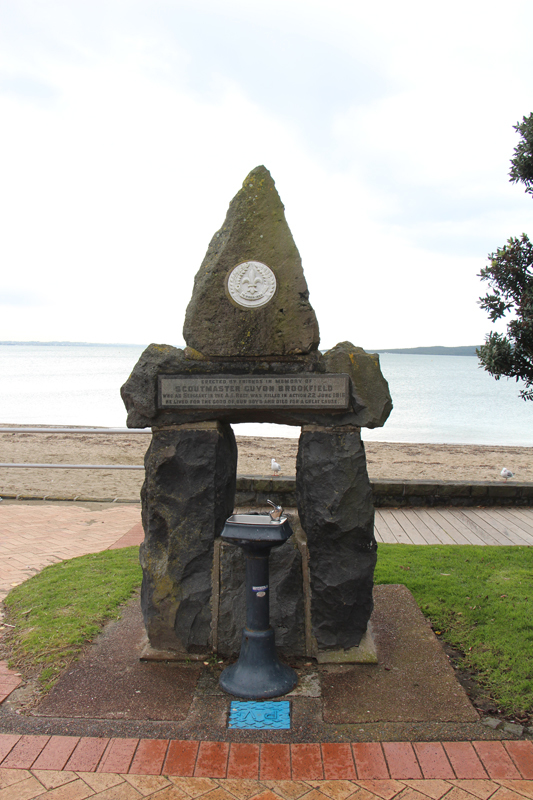
- St Heliers Memorial Fountain 2013
- Interactive map of St Heliers Memorial Fountain
- Location: Saint Heliers, Auckland, New Zealand
- Coordinates: 36°51′01″S 174°51′27″E
- Material: Granite rocks
- Opening date: 1917
- Dedicated to: Arthur Guyon Purchas Brookfield

St Heliers Memorial Fountain is a drinking fountain and war memorial located in St Heliers, Auckland. It honours local St Heliers scoutmaster Guyon Brookfield who died in World War I in 1916. The memorial Fountain was unveiled in 1917, six months after Brookfield's death. It was unveiled in St Heliers Bay along Tāmaki Drive, facing east/west, before being later turned to its current position of north–south facing St Heliers Bay. The memorial was originally a water fountain, not a drinking fountain, which was a later addition.

Chief Scoutmaster Reverend Stanton spoke at the unveiling, encouraging young people to emulate Brookfield's values. The memorial has appeared in lists of Auckland War Memorials, including on The New Zealand Herald.

== Guyon Brookfield ==
=== Life before World War I ===
Brookfield was born in 1882 to Mr Frederic William Brookfield and Mrs Sarah Edith Brookfield, in Auckland. He attended Tamaki West Public School, which would later be renamed St Heliers School, followed by St Johns College School and Auckland Grammar School. At school he was an accomplished sportsman, playing hockey and football.

After leaving school he gained an apprenticeship in oil and steam engines and became an engineer, including patenting an oil engine at his and his brother Arthur's shop in St Heliers. He became the Scout Master of the St Heliers District in 1913, after its establishment in 1912. Under his leadership, the membership of the troop grew quickly. Brookfield lived at Glen Orchard at the time of his enlistment, a notable historical home in Saint Heliers.

=== Service and Death ===
Brookfield entered service on 12 July 1915, three weeks before his brother George was killed in Gallipoli. He departed on 13 November 1015 as part of the 8th Reinforcements, in the Auckland Infantry Regiment. He first served in Egypt, where he was promoted to Lance Corporal on 9 March 1916 at Moascar Camp. During his time in Egypt, Brookfield sent a silk flag back to the St Heliers Scout group as a memento of his time there.

He later served in Northern France, where he was promoted to Corporal on 23 April 1916 and Sergeant on 14 May 2–16 in the Second Battalion of the Auckland Infantry Regiment. on 22 June 1916 Brookfield was shot in the head by a German sniper, and died the next day on 23 June 1916. He was buried in the Cite Bonjean Military Cemetery in France.

Brookfield was 34 years old at the time of his death. His obituary in the Auckland Grammar Chronicle described that "all the good he did for the lads of his district was very great."

== Composition ==
The Memorial is composed of rough granite rocks stacked upon each other, with a metal memorial plaque inset. The marble roundel above the inscription is a scout emblem, the fleur-de-lis, with silver ferns on either side. The scout motto of "be prepared" is inscribed upon the roundel. The shape of the stone at the top of the memorial is designed to be the general shape of a scout's hat of the time in 1916.

=== Inscription ===
Image of Inscription	Inscription Text
	WE PREPARE
	ERECTED BY FRIENDS IN MEMORY OF SCOUTMASTER GUYON BROOKFIELD WHO AS SERGEANT IN THE A.I REGT WAS KILLED IN ACTION 22 JUNE 1916 HE LIVED FOR THE GOOD OF OUR BOYS AND DIED FOR A GREAT CAUSE

== Gallery ==
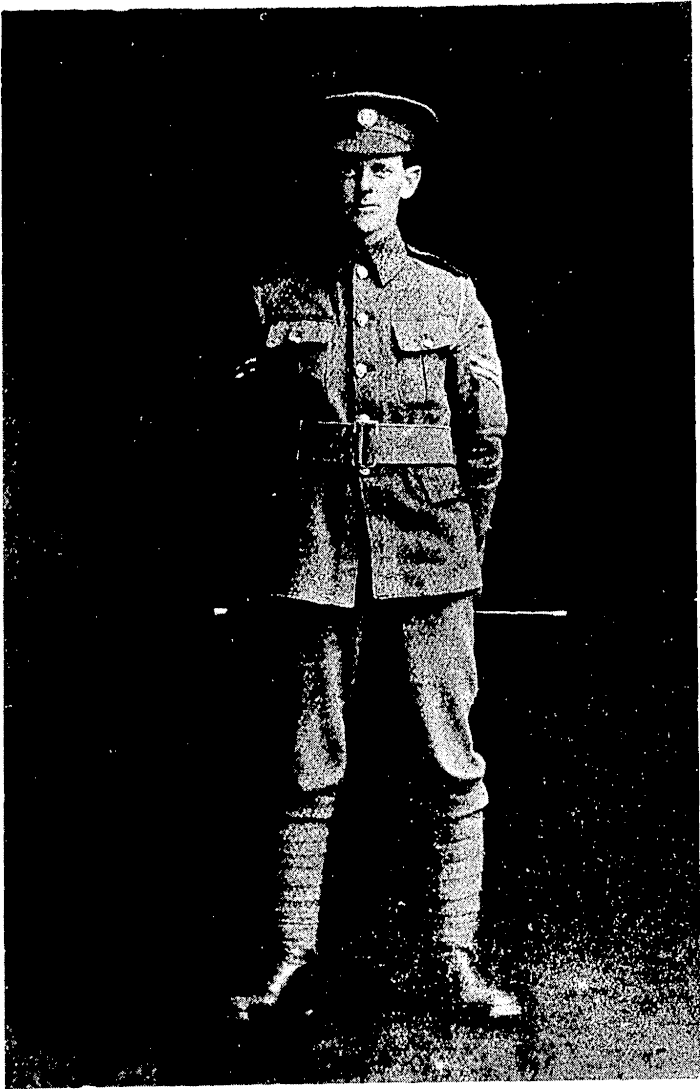
Guyon Brookfield obituary photograph 1916

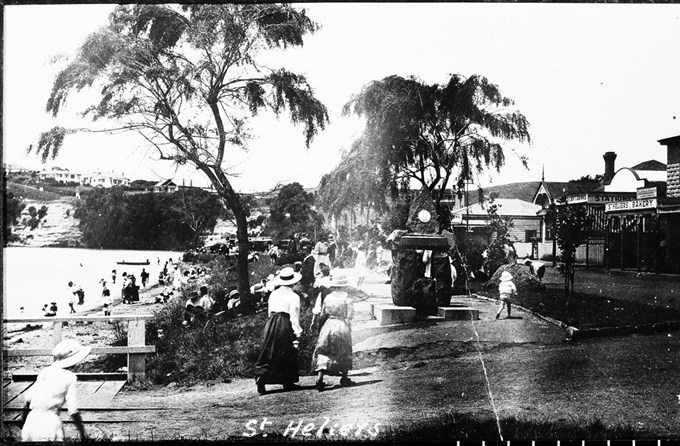
St Heliers Memorial Fountain in original position, 1917

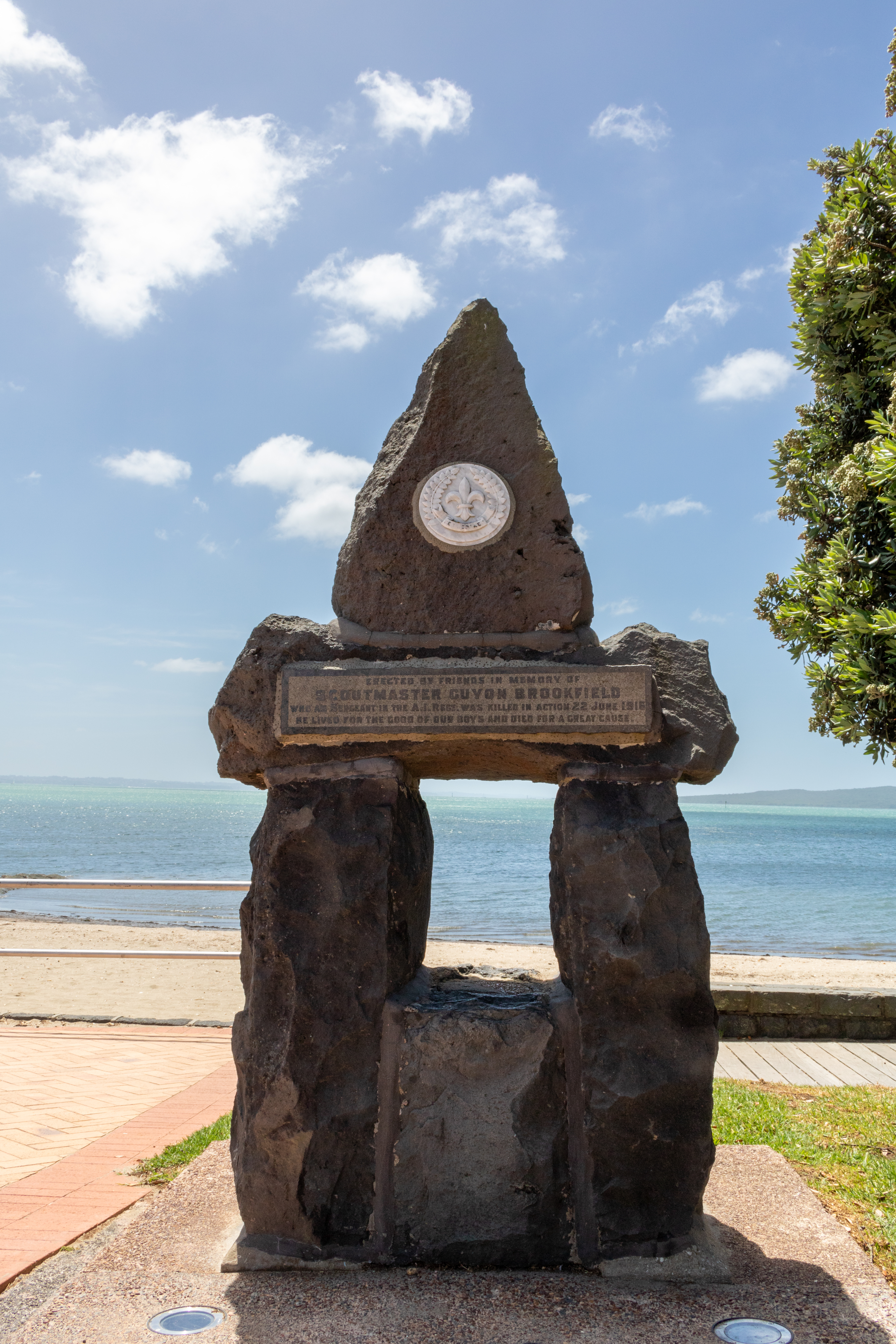
St Heliers Memorial Fountain in January 2025 (without fountain)
