= Achilles (1906–1912 motorcycle) =

The Achilles was a motorcycle manufactured between 1906 and 1912 in the former Czechoslovakia. The bikes were powered by 3.5 hp single-cylinder and 5 hp V-twin engines built by Fafnir and Zeus.
