= Giovanni Filoteo Achillini =

Italian philosopher

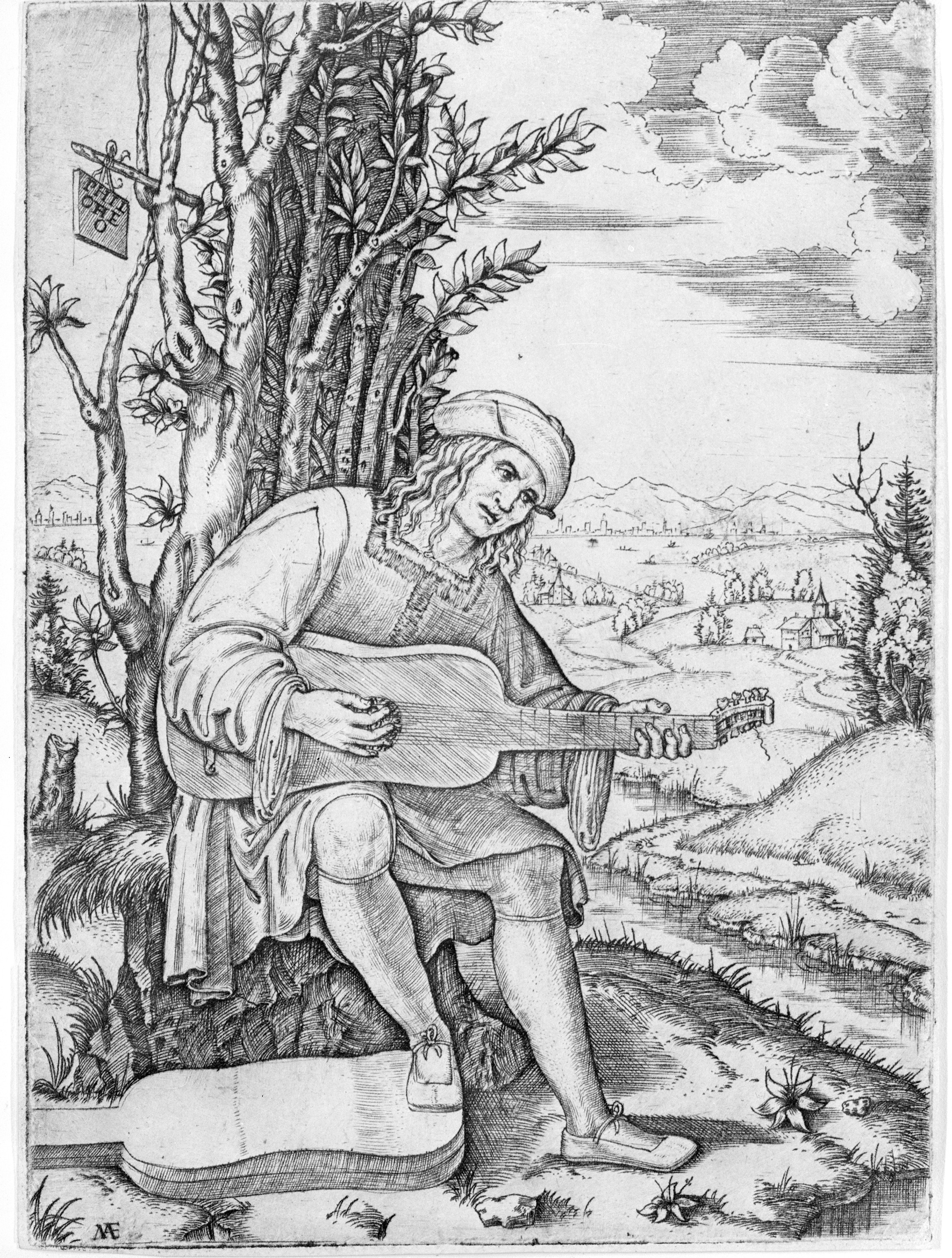
A well-known engraving of Giovanni Filoteo Achillini; Suonatore di viola da mano, by Marcantonio Raimondi, ca. 1510. It was produced from a lost original painting by Francesco Francia.

Giovanni Filoteo Achillini (Latin Joannes Philotheus Achillinus; 1466–1538) was an Italian philosopher.

Born in Bologna, he was the younger brother of philosopher Alessandro. He studied Greek, Latin, theology, philosophy, music, antiquities, jurisprudence, poetry, etc., but did not excel in any specific field. He accumulated ample collections of antiquities.

His poetry is the most noteworthy of his work, written in what has since been considered the bad taste that prevailed at the end of the 15th century; however, most of his works have left little memory of their existence apart from their titles. One of the principal works was titled Viridario and contained a eulogy of many of his contemporaries in literature, with lessons of morality. He also wrote some remarks on Italian to the disparagement of the Tuscan dialect and the praise of the Bolognese dialect (which he had used in his poems).

== Works ==
- Achillini, Giovanni Filoteo (1536). Annotazioni della Lingua Volgare (8 vols. ed.). Bologna.
- Achillini, Giovanni Filoteo (1513). Viridario de Gioanne Philotheo Achillino Bolognese (in Italian). Bologna: Hieronymo di Plato.

== See also ==
- Claudio Achillini, his grandson
