= HMS Achille =

Four ships of the Royal Navy have been named HMS Achille, after the Greek hero Achilles. The French spelling celebrates the capture of ships of this name from the French.

- HMS Achille (1745) was an 8-gun French sloop captured in 1745 during the War of the Austrian Succession and later captured by the Spanish.
- HMS Achille (1794) was a 78-gun third-rate ship of the line, originally launched as the French Annibal in 1778. She was renamed Achille in 1786, and was captured at the Glorious First of June in 1794. She was broken up in 1796.
- HMS Achille (1780) was a storeship purchased in 1780 and sold in 1784.
- HMS Achille (1798) was 74-gun third rate launched in 1798. She fought at the Battle of Trafalgar and was sold in 1865.

== See also ==
- HMS Achilles
