= Achilleos =

Achilleos (Greek: Αχιλλέως) is a surname. Notable people with the surname include:

- Chris Achilléos (1947–2021), Cypriot-born British painter and illustrator
- Georgios Achilleos (born 1980), Cypriot sport shooter
- Stelios Achilleos (born 1980), Cypriot footballer
