= USS Achilles =

At least two United States Navy ships have borne the name Achilles, in honor of the Greek hero Achilles:

- The first USS Achilles (1869) was the name briefly given to the monitor USS Modoc (1865) on 15 June 1869.
- The second USS Achilles (ARL-41) was an LST-1-class tank landing ship converted into an Achelous-class repair ship. Initially commissioned on 30 January 1943 and decommissioned on 19 July 1946, she was sold to the Chinese. The ship received three engagement stars for her World War II service: one as LST-455 and two as Achilles (ARL-41).
