= HMS Achilles =

Several ships of the Royal Navy have been named Achilles, after the Greek hero Achilles. Four others, two of them prizes, had the French spelling of the name, Achille.

- HMS Achilles (1747) was an 8-gun schooner purchased in 1747. She was captured in 1748 by the Spanish.
- HMS Achilles (1757) was a 60-gun fourth rate launched in 1757, hulked in 1780 and sold in 1784.
- HMS Achilles (1863) was a broadside ironclad frigate launched in 1863. She became a base ship in 1902 and was renamed HMS Hibernia. She was renamed HMS Egmont in 1904, HMS Egremont in 1916 and HMS Pembroke in 1919. She was sold in 1923.
- HMS Achilles (1905) was a Warrior-class armoured cruiser launched in 1905 and sold in 1921.
- Achilles II was an armed trawler, hired in 1914 and sunk by a mine on 26 June 1918.
- HMS Achilles (70) was a Leander-class light cruiser launched in 1932. She was transferred to the Royal New Zealand Navy as HMNZS Achilles in 1941, but was returned in 1946. She was transferred to the Royal Indian Navy in 1948 as HMIS Delhi, eventually becoming INS Delhi. She was scrapped in 1978.
- HMS Achilles (F12) was a Leander-class frigate launched in 1968. She was sold to Chile in 1990 and renamed Ministro Zenteno.
- HMS Achilles (S125) is an Astute-class submarine that is under construction and due to enter service in late 2026.

== Battle honours ==
Ships named Achilles have earned the following battle honours:

- Belle Isle, 1761
- Leopard, 1917
- River Plate, 1939
- Guadalcanal, 1942−43
- Okinawa, 1945

== See also ==
- HMS Achille
