= Alessandro Achillini =

Italian philosopher and physician

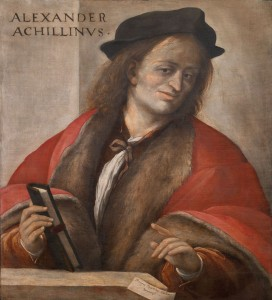
Alessandro Achillini

Alessandro Achillini (Latin Alexander Achillinus; 20 or 29 October 1463 (or possibly 1461) – 2 August 1512) was an Italian philosopher and physician. He is known for the anatomic studies that he was able to publish, made possible by a 13th-century edict putatively by Emperor Frederick II allowing for dissection of human cadavers, and which previously had stimulated the anatomist Mondino de Luzzi (c. 1270 – 1326) at Bologna.

== Biography ==
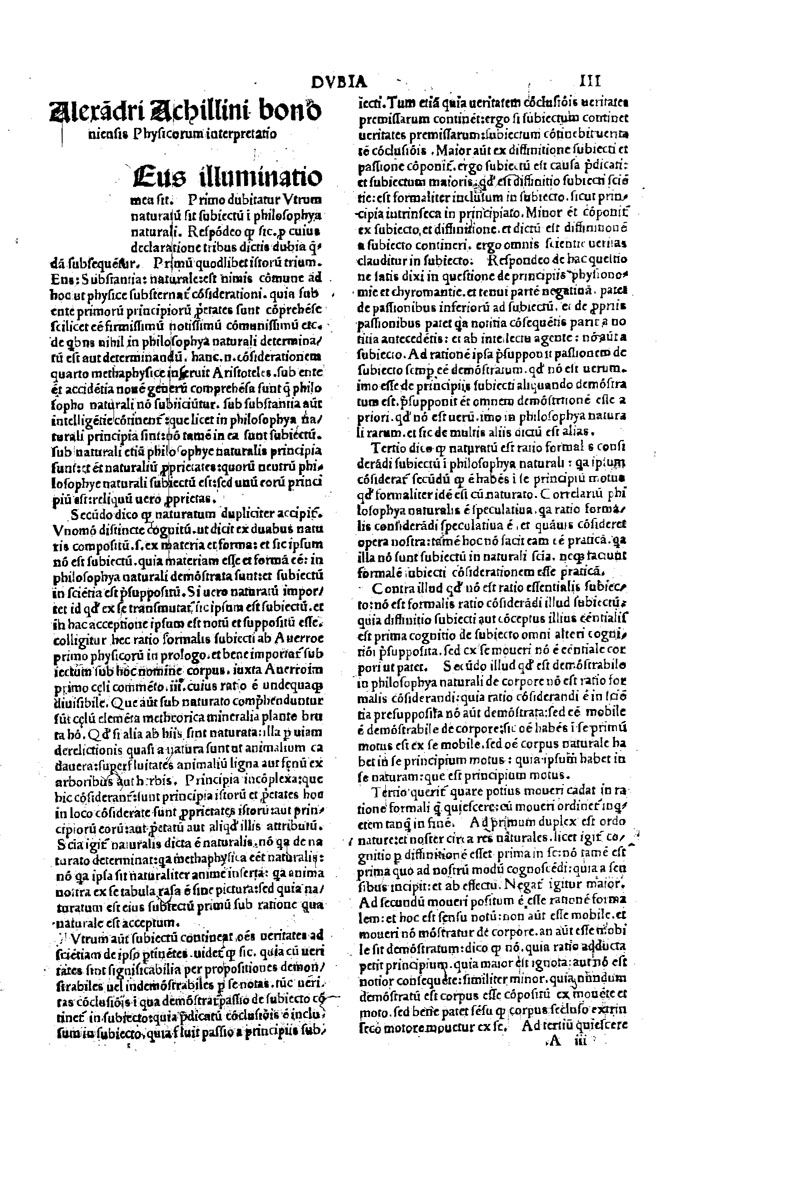
Expositio primi physicorum, 1512

Achillini was born in Bologna and lived the majority of his life there. He was the son of Claudio Achillini, member of an old family of Bologna. He was celebrated as a lecturer both in medicine and in philosophy at Bologna and Padua, and was styled the second Aristotle.

He was of a very simplistic nature. He was unskilled in the arts of adulation and double-dealing to such a degree that his most witty and imprudent students often regarded him as an object of ridicule, even though they honored him as a teacher. He also possessed quite a lively disposition. According to a colleague's description, he was handsome, tall but well proportioned, cheerful, happy, often smiling, and affable. Achillini never married. His reputation among his colleagues was admirable and he was highly respected. And although Achillini was well-read and formidable in debate, he was said to be somewhat rigid and stiff in his lecturing. After his death, many people were extremely devastated. His philosophical works were printed in one volume folio, at Venice, in 1508, and reprinted with considerable additions in 1545, 1551 and 1568.

He died in Bologna on 2 August 1512 and was buried the following day in the church of San Martino. Among his notable discoveries, he is known as the first anatomist to describe the two tympanal bones of the ear, termed malleus and incus. In 1503 he showed that the tarsus (middle part of the foot) consists of seven bones, he rediscovered the fornix and the infundibulum of the brain. He also described the ducts of the submaxillary salivary glands.

His brother was the author Giovanni Filoteo Achillini, and his grandnephew, Claudio Achillini (1572-1640), was a lawyer.

In 1506, he was obliged to leave Bologna owing to the expulsion of the powerful Bentivoglio family of whom he was a partisan. He then went to Padua where he was appointed teacher of philosophy.

== Career ==
Alessandro Achillini began teaching when he was 21 years old. From the years 1484-1512, except 1506-1508, he was a professor of Medicine and/or Philosophy in the University of Bologna. During the 2-year period between 1506-1508 Achillini was a professor at the University of Padua. Achillini taught at Bologna for twenty-eight years, which is longer than anyone who has ever taught at Bologna in medicine or philosophy.

The University of Padua had a statute, that if a professor failed to read on any assigned day, or failed to have a certain number students it would be documented and then later there would be a diminution of salary per occurrence. During the months of December–March 1506 – 1507 Achillini did not meet the requirement for reading, to which he was penalized 351 Bolognese Lire. Achillini also received two strongly-worded letters in August and September 1507 from the Commune of Bologna stating that his absence was unauthorized, and if it continued he would be penalized severely (500 ducats of gold for the first offense).

Achillini attended many doctoral committees as a member for the examination and approval of candidates. There are records of him attending at least ninety times to these proceedings. The proceedings are doctoral examinations or elections of new members to the Company of Collegiate Doctors.

In addition, Achillini's was well versed in theology. His initial designs indicate an interest in entering the priesthood. He appears to have begun his seminar studies prior to 1476; the year he entered the tonsure at the Cathedral of Bologna. And though he later shifted his focus to academia, he remained an active theologian throughout his life and contributed to two General Congresses of the Franciscan Order; one in Bologna in 1494 and another held in Rome between 1505 and 1506.

While in residence at Bologna, Achillini is credited as being instrumental in generating interest in William of Ockham. The extent of Achillini's endorsement is difficult to discern, but it is believed he and his contemporaries at the university instigated a brief Ockhamistic revival as reflected by his students' later works.

== Publications ==
The “Anatomical Notes by the Great Alexander Achillinus of Bologna” demonstrate a detailed description of the human body. Achillini compares what he has found during his dissections to what others like Galen and Avicenna have found and notes their similarities and differences. Achillinus states there are seven features when examining the body instead of the believed six given in Galen's book On Sects. These seven features are size, number, location, form, substance as in thin or thick, substance as in fleshy or bony, and complexion. In this work, Achillinus also gives directions as how to proceed with certain dissections and procedures such as castration, extraction of stone, and removal of the rib cage to further examine the heart and lungs.

He was also distinguished as an anatomist, among his writings being De humani corporis anatomia (Venice, 1516–1524), and Annotationes anatomicae (Bologna, 1520). Achillini's Annotationes Anatomicae was first published by his brother, Giovanni Filoteo, on 24 September 1520. It was published in a small format of eighteen folios with a pair of poems of six and two lines each.
