= Phyllonorycter achilleus =

Scientific classification
- Domain: Eukaryota
- Kingdom: Animalia
- Phylum: Arthropoda
- Class: Insecta
- Order: Lepidoptera
- Family: Gracillariidae
- Genus: Phyllonorycter
- Species: P. achilleus

Binomial name
- Phyllonorycter achilleus de Prins, 2012

Species of insect

Phyllonorycter achilleus is a moth of the family Gracillariidae. It is found in the Albertine Rift and the Kakamega Forest in western Kenya. The habitat consists of tropical rainforests where Guineo-Congolian flora intermixes with savannah plants at altitudes above 1,500 meters.
