= Achilles Point =

Point in New Zealand

Coordinates: 36.843390°S 174.863800°E

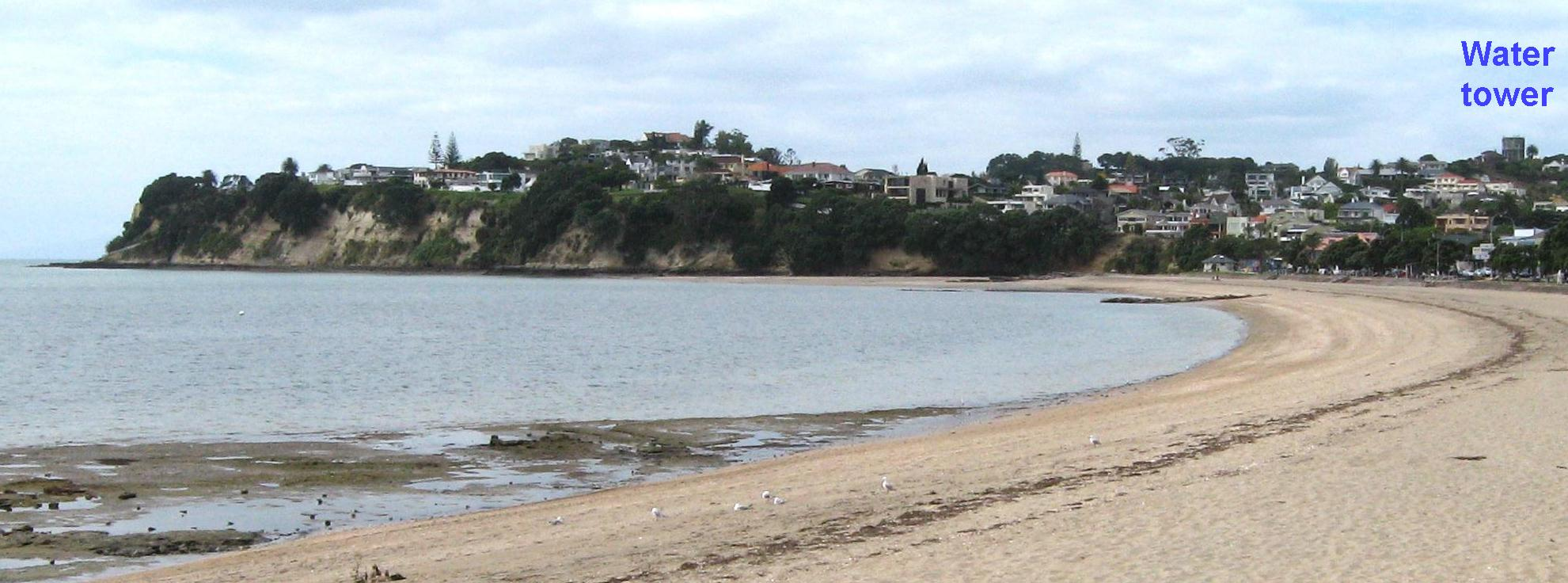
Looking east from St Heliers Bay towards Achilles Point

Achilles Point (Te Pane o Horoiwi – The head of Horoiwi) is a rocky point on the headland at the eastern end of the small sandy beach named Ladies Bay, in Auckland, New Zealand. The name Te Pane o Horoiwi can also refer to the entire headland between St Heliers and the Tāmaki River estuary. Achilles Point is named after HMNZS Achilles (70), which defeated the German pocket battleship Admiral Graf Spee in 1939. The headland, from the point round to the Tāmaki heads, was previously known as Te Pane o Horoiwi, named after Horoiwi who arrived in New Zealand on the Tainui canoe (waka).

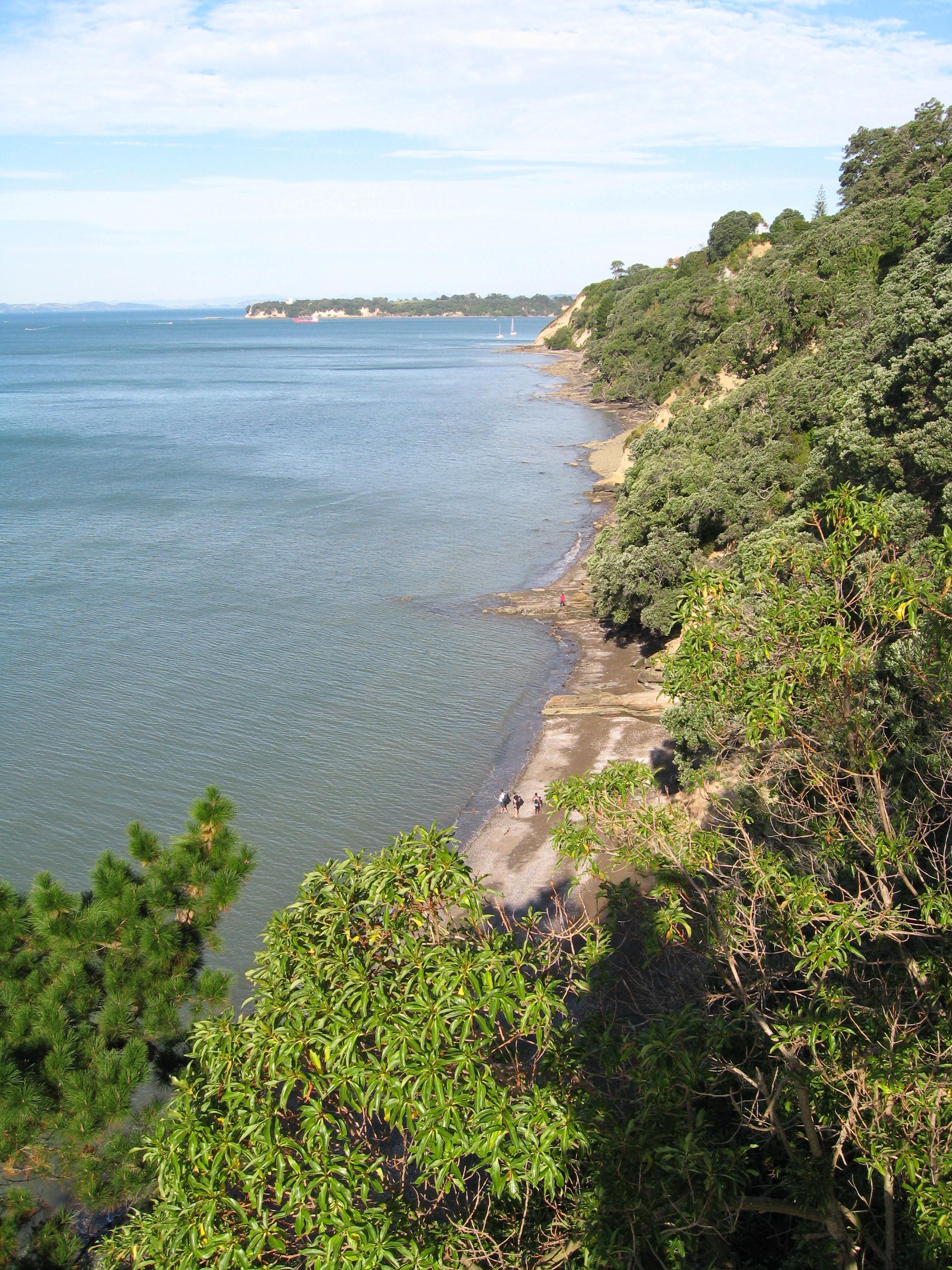
View from the lookout, looking east over Gentleman's Bay towards Tāmaki point, the entrance to the Tāmaki River estuary, then on the horizon Musick Point

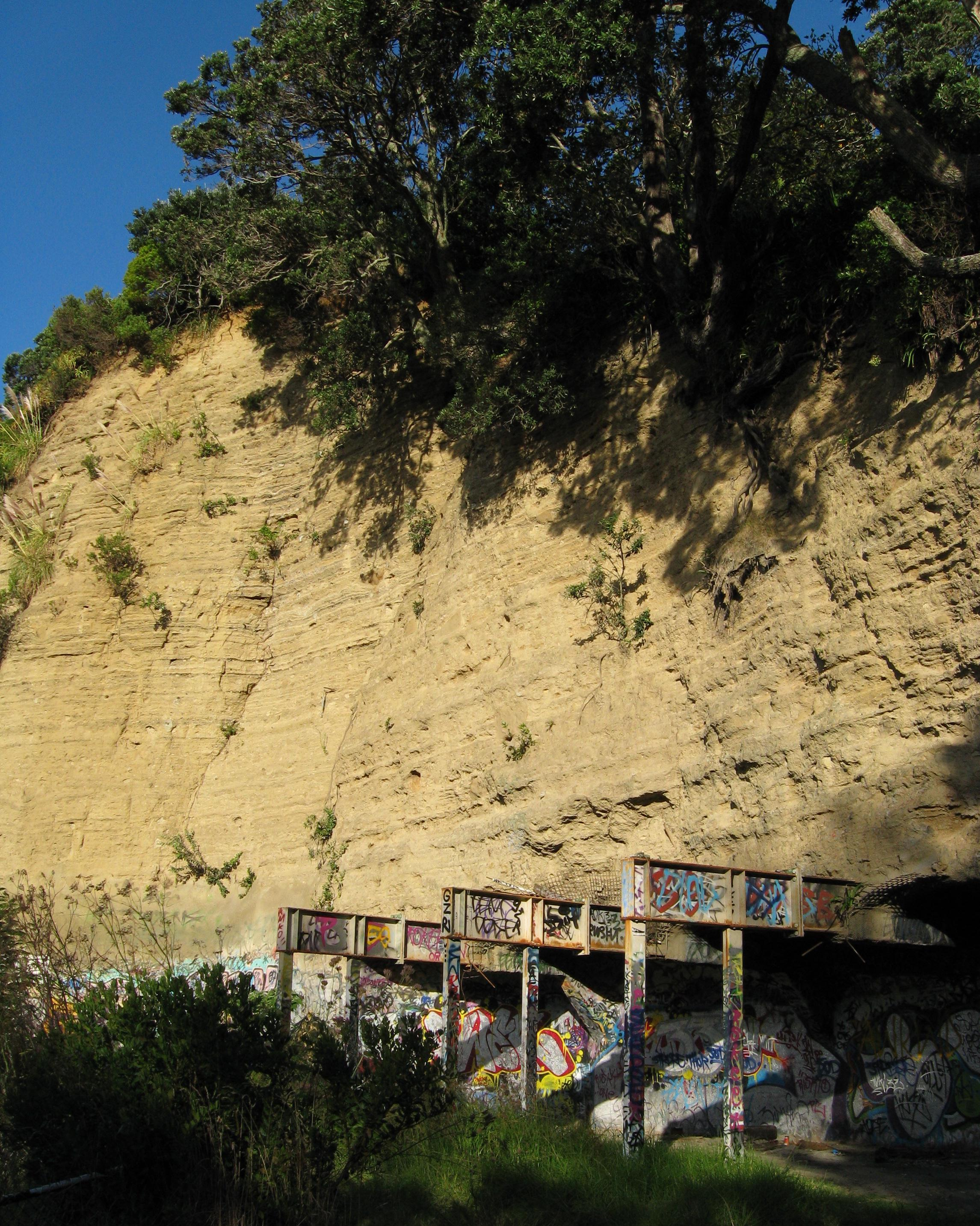
High above Gentleman's Bay, an abandoned building site with crumbling cliffs

The seaward side of the tuff crater is falling down the coastal cliffs towards Gentleman's Bay below. The tuff ring is made from ash and ejected material. The cliffs were there before the volcano erupted, so the volcanic rock draped over the clay hill that existed before sealevels rose and began eroding it away to become steep cliffs. Some volcanic rocks can be found on the beach below – some fragments ejected from deep in the earth, or blocks of tuff ring that were once perched atop the cliff. Rangitoto Island is directly to the north. Rangitoto is a recent eruption (600 to 550 years ago) and was not always there to shelter the cliffs from powerful wave action. An old concrete water tower built on the tuff ring formed around the edge of the crater opposite the seaward side.

== Geology ==
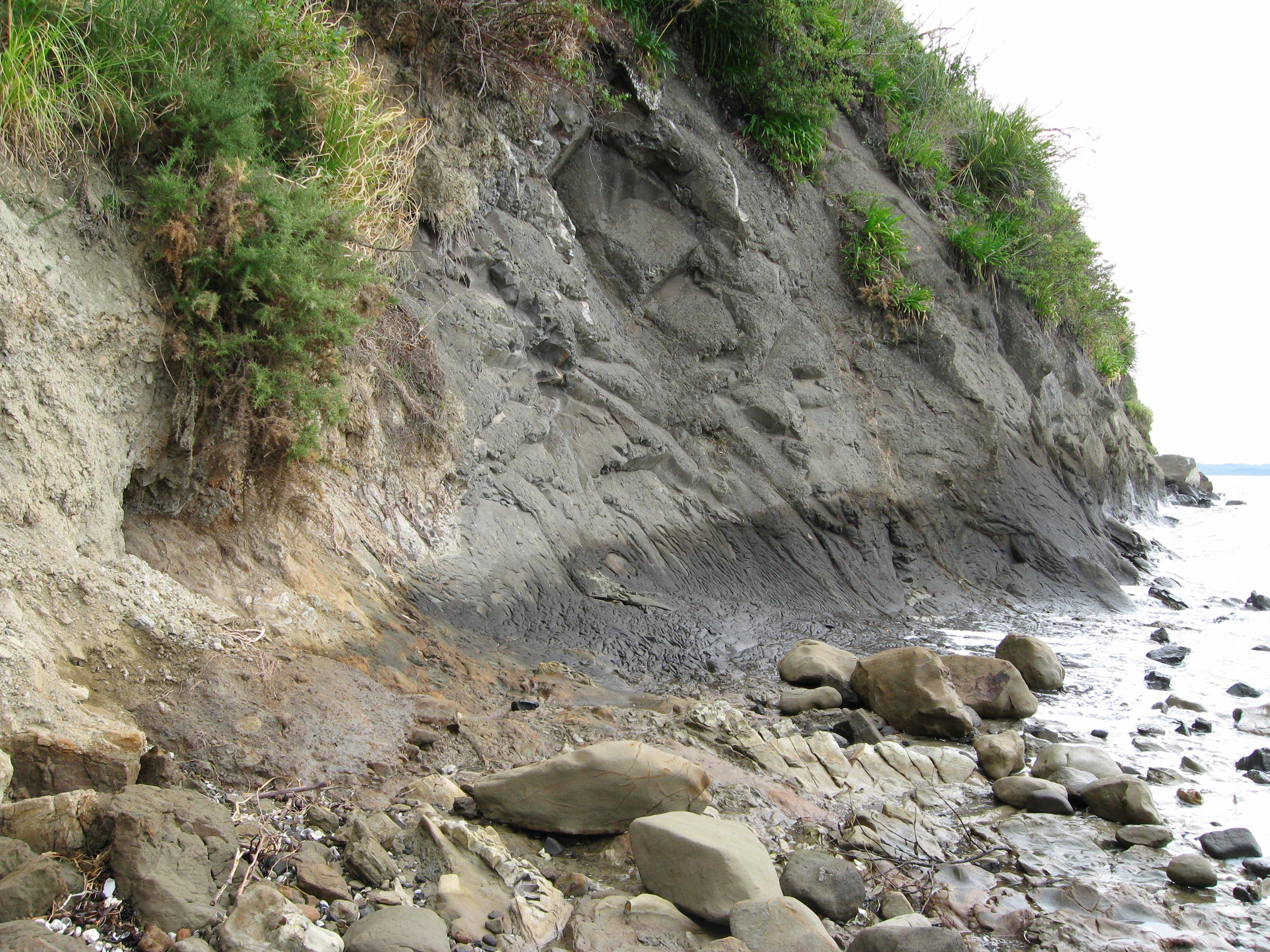
Looking north from Karaka Bay towards Tāmaki Point (1 km from Achilles Point)

Glover Park volcano formed from a phreatomagmatic eruption, leaving a basaltic monogenetic volcanic crater up to 300 m (980 ft) in diameter, surrounded except to the north-east by tuff deposits that extend about 500 m (1,600 ft) to the east and south. The presence of overlying Rotoehu tephra on a drill core means the volcano last erupted more than 45,000 years ago, but the age is uncertain. The cliff retreat with rising sea levels implies that the tuff deposits 30 m (98 ft) up the cliffs, as they erode, fall onto the sea rock platform. This has resulted in the discovery that a distinctive lithic clast in the tuff that contained shell fragments was strong evidence that the erupted magma traversed the eastern border of the ophiolitic Dun Mountain–Maitai terrane.
