= 2004 New Zealand local elections =

Local elections in New Zealand

- 9 October 2004
- 86 of 86 councils
| Party | Councils | +/– |
|---|---|---|
| missing info | | |
This lists parties that won seats. See the complete results below.
- 74 mayors, ?? local councillors, and 12 regional councillors
| Party | Seats | +/– |
Mayors
| missing info | | |
Local councillors
| missing info | | |
Regional councillors
| missing info | | |
This lists parties that won seats. See the complete results below.

The 2004 New Zealand local elections (Māori: Nga Pōtitanga ā-Rohe 2004) were triennial elections that were held ending 9 October 2004 to elect local mayors and councillors, regional councillors, and members of local boards.

== Key dates ==
The deadline for the elections happened on Saturday, 9 October 2004. The most of the elections successfully happened around 9-10 October 2004.

== Background ==
=== Voting system ===
All district health boards and ten district or city councils (Kaipara, Papakura, Matamata-Piako, Thames-Coromandel, Kāpiti Coast, Porirua, Wellington, Marlborough, Dunedin, and the Chatham Islands) used the single transferable vote (STV) method for the 2004 local elections. All other councils used first past the post (FPP).

A private company, elections.com and its subsidiary Datamail, had been engaged by seven councils, eighteen DHBs, and one licensing trust with operating the STV elections. During the weekend of the elections, it was discovered that when voting papers were transferred to computer-readable data, not all data were correctly recorded. The Office of the Auditor-General became involved and tasked with confirming the election results. The final results for these elections became available in early November, nearly one month after the local election. The government initiated a select committee inquiry.

== Elections ==
=== Regional councils ===
The regional level of government in New Zealand is organised into areas controlled by regional councils.

| Council | Electoral System | Seats | Councillors | | Turnout | Details | Sources |
| Council | Electoral System | Seats | 2001 | Result | Turnout | Details | Sources |
|---|---|---|---|---|---|---|---|
| Northland | FPP | 8 | 8 Independents | 8 missing info | 40,942 (43.2%) | Details | |
| Auckland | FPP | 13 | 6 Independents; 3 Citizens & Ratepayers; 2 Advancing Auckland; 2 Team West | 5 Independents; 3 Citizens & Ratepayers; 2 Team West; 1 City Vision; 1 Advancing Auckland; 1 Residents Action Movement | 351,833 (41.9%) | Details | |
| Waikato | FPP | 14 | 13 Independents; 1 Hamilton First | 14 Independents | 100,640 (40.0%) | Details | |
| Bay of Plenty | FPP | 14 | 12 Independents | 14 Independents | 66,421 (39.0%) | Details | |
| Hawke's Bay | FPP | 9 | 9 Independents | 9 Independents | 21,628 (21.7%) | Details | |
| Taranaki | FPP | 10 | 10 Independents | 10 Independents | 29,378 (39.7%) | Details | |
| Manawatu-Wanganui | FPP | 11 | 11 Independents | 11 missing info | 68,491 (44.7%) | Details | |
| Wellington | FPP | 13 | 11 Independents; 1 Hutt 2020; 1 City Vision – Terris' Team | 11 Independents; 1 Hutt 2020; 1 Labour | 109,026 (34.9%) | Details | |
| West Coast | FPP | 6 | 6 Independents | 6 Independents | 15,337 (68.1%) | Details | |
| Canterbury | FPP | 14 | 7 Independents; 3 Labour for Christchurch 2021; 3 Independents for Christchurch 2021; 1 Independent Citizens | 14 missing info | 155,756 (43.0%) | Details | |
| Otago | FPP | 12 | 12 Independents | 12 Independents | 62,096 (45.4%) | Details | |
| Southland | FPP | 12 | 12 Independents | 12 Independents | 31,406 (47.5%) | Details | |
| All 12 councils | | 136 | | | | | |

=== Territorial authorities ===
The city and district level of government in New Zealand is organised into areas controlled by territorial authorities. Some of these also have the powers of regional governments and are known as unitary authorities. The Chatham Islands have their own specially legislated form of government.

| Council | Electoral System | Seats | Councillors | | Turnout | Details | Sources |
| Council | Electoral System | Seats | 2001 | Result | Turnout | Details | Sources |
|---|---|---|---|---|---|---|---|
| Far North | FPP | 9 | 6 Independent; 3 The Proven Team; 1 Community First | 9 Independents | 15,354 (45.3%) | | |
| Whangarei | FPP | 13 | 13 Independents | 13 Independents | 25,612 (52.1%) | | |
| Kaipara | STV | 10 | 9 Independents; 1 Residents & Ratepayers | 10 Independents | 6,073 (51.1%) | | |
| Rodney | FPP | 12 | 12 Independents | 9 Independents; 3 Taking Action Team | 27,086 (45.5%) | | |
| Auckland City | FPP | 19 | 9 Citizens & Ratepayers; 4 City Vision; 3 Independents; 2 Labour; 1 Team Auckland | 6 Citizens & Ratepayers; 6 City Vision; 3 Labour; 2 Action Hobson; 2 Independents | 132,505 (49.2%) | | |
| North Shore | FPP | 15 | 15 Independents | 15 missing info | 49,226 (35.2%) | | |
| Waitakere | FPP | 14 | 9 Team West; 3 Independents; 2 Independent Ratepayers and Residents | 4 Team West; 4 Residents & Ratepayers; 4 Independents; 2 Massey Community Team | 42,391 (35.7%) | | |
| Manukau | FPP | 17 | 4 Independents; 4 Labour; 4 Manurewa Residents; 3 Howick Community Spirit; 3 Papatoetoe Independents; 1 Independent Ratepayers; 1 PR&RT | 7 Independents; 4 Labour; 4 Manurewa Residents; 1 Peoples Choice; 1 Papatoetoe Independents | 79,095 (39.8%) | | prev source= }} |
| Papakura | STV | 8 | 4 Independents; 3 Papakura Vision; 1 Your Team | 7 Independents; 1 Papakura Vision | 11,354 (40.2%) | | |
| Franklin | FPP | 12 | 14 Independents | 12 Independents | 16,883 (45.9%) | | |
| Thames-Coromandel | STV | 9 | 9 Independents | 8 Independents; 1 vacant | 10,144 (50.2%) | | |
| Hauraki | FPP | 13 | 13 Independents | 13 Independents | 4,569 (38.3%) | | |
| Waikato | FPP | 13 | 13 Independents | 13 Independents | 7,869 (29.1%) | | |
| Matamata-Piako | STV | 11 | 11 Independents | 11 Independents | 8,663 (42.2%) | | |
| Hamilton | FPP | 13 | 7 Independents; 3 Hamilton First; 3 Proudly Independent | 12 Independents; 1 Hamilton Citizens & Ratepayers Assoc. Inc. | 37,852 (45.1%) | | |
| Waipa | FPP | 12 | 12 Independents | 10 Independents; 2 missing info | 9,942 (35.1%) | | |
| Otorohanga | FPP | 7 | 6 Independents; 1 vacant | 7 Independents | 1,824 (33.4%) | | |
| South Waikato | FPP | 10 | 13 Independents | 10 Independents | 5,535 (37.3%) | | |
| Waitomo | FPP | 6 | 6 Independents | 6 Independents | 3,167 (55.8%) | | |
| Taupo | FPP | 12 | 10 Independents; 2 Taupo Concerned Citizens | 12 Independents | 9,853 (44.6%) | | |
| Western Bay of Plenty | FPP | 12 | 9 Independents; 2 Resource Users Association; 1 Democracy Network in Action | 12 Independents | 7,833 (27.2%) | | |
| Tauranga | FPP | 10 | 12 Independents; 1 Ratepayers Action | 10 missing info | 32,727 (46.4%) | | |
| Rotorua Lakes | FPP | 12 | 12 Independents | 12 Independents | 21,037 (48.8%) | | |
| Whakatane | FPP | 11 | 13 Independents | 10 Independents; 1 vacant | 10,465 (48.3%) | | |
| Kawerau | FPP | 8 | 8 Independents | 8 Independents | 1,343 (31.6%) | | |
| Opotiki | FPP | 6 | 10 Independents | 6 missing info | 1,482 (26.7%) | | |
| Gisborne | FPP | 14 | 13 Independents; 1 Rates Reform | 14 Independents | 13,451 (47.2%) | | |
| Wairoa | FPP | 9 | 9 Independents | 9 missing info | 3,001 (56.2%) | | |
| Hastings | FPP | 15 | 15 Independents | 15 Independents | 17,774 (37.9%) | | |
| Napier | FPP | 12 | 12 Independents | 12 Independents | 18,645 (47.8%) | | |
| Central Hawke's Bay | FPP | 10 | 10 Independents | 10 Independents | 4,751 (54.8%) | | |
| New Plymouth | FPP | 14 | 16 Independents | 14 Independents | 27,579 (55.2%) | | |
| Stratford | FPP | 10 | 10 Independents | 10 Independents | 2,922 (46.4%) | | |
| South Taranaki | FPP | 12 | 12 Independents | 12 Independents | 7,840 (43.5%) | | |
| Ruapehu | FPP | 11 | 11 Independents | 11 Independents | 3,402 (40.1%) | | |
| Wanganui | FPP | 12 | 12 missing info | 6 Vision Wanganui; 5 Independents; 1 Wanganui Ratepayers Association | 20,154 (66.8%) | | |
| Rangitikei | FPP | 11 | 11 Independents | 11 Independents | 5,438 (53.5%) | | |
| Manawatu | FPP | 10 | 10 Independents | 10 Independents | 6,143 (31.1%) | | |
| Palmerston North | FPP | 15 | 15 Independents | 15 missing info | 25,679 (49.8%) | | |
| Tararua | FPP | 8 | 8 Independents | 8 Independents | 6,200 (51.5%) | | |
| Horowhenua | FPP | 10 | 10 missing info | 10 missing info | 11,336 (53.3%) | | |
| Kapiti Coast | STV | 10 | 14 Independents | 9 Independents; 1 Affordable Kapiti | 17,111 (51.2%) | | |
| Porirua | STV | 13 | 7 Independents; 6 Labour | 8 missing info; 5 Labour | 13,426 (42.7%) | | |
| Upper Hutt | FPP | 10 | 10 Independents | 10 Independents | 11,933 (45.4%) | | |
| Lower Hutt | FPP | 11 | 5 City Vision – Terris' Team; 4 Independents; 1 Hutt 2020 – Labour; 1 Hutt 2020 | 5 Independents; 3 City Vision – Terris' Team; 2 Our City, Our Future; 1 Hutt 2020 | 26,018 (38.9%) | | |
| Wellington | STV | 14 | 12 Independents; 3 Three 4 North; 2 Labour; 1 Alliance; 1 Green | 10 Independents; 1 Alliance; 1 1-2-3 for North; 1 Labour; 1 Green | 53,483 (42.2%) | Details | |
| Masterton | FPP | 10 | 10 missing info | 10 Independents | 10,480 (65.2%) | | |
| Carterton | FPP | 8 | 8 Independents | 8 Independents | 3,197 (61.0%) | | |
| South Wairarapa | FPP | 9 | 9 Independents | 9 Independents | 2,478 (38.7%) | | |
| Tasman | FPP | 13 | 13 missing info | 13 Independents | 15,156 (49.0%) | | |
| Nelson | FPP | 12 | 12 Independents | 12 Independents | 15,253 (48.5%) | | |
| Marlborough | STV | 13 | 13 Independents | 13 Independents | 19,185 (62.4%) | | |
| Buller | FPP | 11 | 11 missing info | 11 Independents | 4,915 (69.7%) | | |
| Grey | FPP | 8 | 8 Independents | 8 Independents | 4,133 (42.4%) | | |
| Westland | FPP | 12 | 12 Independents | 12 Independents | 3,276 (57.0%) | | |
| Kaikoura | FPP | 7 | 7 Independents | 7 Independents | 1,672 (65.2%) | | |
| Hurunui | FPP | 9 | 9 missing info | 9 Independents | 3,034 (40.7%) | | |
| Waimakariri | FPP | 10 | 14 Independents | 10 Independents | 11,309 (39.1%) | | |
| Christchurch | FPP | 12 | 8 Labour for Christchurch 2021; 7 Independent Citizens; 4 Ind. for Christchurch 2021; 4 Independents; 1 Alliance for Christchurch 2021 | 9 Independents; 2 Independent Citizens; 1 Labour for Christchurch 2021 | 91,572 (38.8%) | | |
| Banks Peninsula | FPP | 7 | 7 Independents | 4 Positive Future; 3 missing info | 3,271 (51.9%) | | |
| Selwyn | FPP | 10 | 11 Independents | 10 Independents | 6,405 (30.5%) | | |
| Ashburton | FPP | 12 | 12 Independents | 12 Independents | 9,579 (49.8%) | | |
| Timaru | FPP | 12 | 12 Independents | 12 Independents | 18,878 (58.6%) | | |
| Mackenzie | FPP | 6 | 10 Independents | 6 Independents | 1,811 (66.3%) | | |
| Waimate | FPP | 8 | 8 Independents | 8 Independents | 2,852 (53.4%) | | |
| Waitaki | FPP | 10 | 15 Independents | 10 missing info | 9,555 (62.9%) | | |
| Central Otago | FPP | 13 | 13 Independents | 13 Independents | 4,655 (39.0%) | | |
| Queenstown-Lakes | FPP | 11 | 11 Independents | 11 Independents | 7,262 (50.3%) | | |
| Dunedin | STV | 14 | 14 Independents | 14 missing info | 34,961 (41.4%) | | |
| Clutha | FPP | 14 | 14 Independents | 14 Independents | 3,548 (29.3%) | | |
| Southland | FPP | 12 | 12 Independents | 12 Independents | 3,966 (19.8%) | | |
| Gore | FPP | 11 | 11 Independents | 11 Independents | 650 (7.1%) | | |
| Invercargill | FPP | 12 | 12 Independents | 12 Independents | 20,311 (54.8%) | | |
| Chatham Islands | STV | 8 | 8 Independents | 8 Independents | 253 (67.8%) | | |
| All 74 councils | | 819 | | | | | |

=== Mayors ===
All territorial authorities (including the one unitary authority) directly elected mayors.

| Territorial authority | Incumbent | Elected | Runner-up | Details | Sources |
|---|---|---|---|---|---|
| Far North | Yvonne Sharp (Ind) | | Danny Simms (Ind) | | |
| Whangarei | Craig Brown (Ind) | Pamela Peters (Ind) | Phil Halse (Ind) | | |
| Kaipara | Graeme Ramsey (Ind) | Peter King (Ind) | Pauline Rose (Ind) | | |
| Rodney | John Law (Ind) | | Larry Mitchell (Ind) | | |
| Auckland City | John Banks (Ind) | Dick Hubbard (Ind) | John Banks (Ind) | Details | |
| North Shore | George Wood (Ind) | | Tony Holman (Ind) | | |
| Waitakere | Bob Harvey (Ind) | | Vanessa Neeson (Ind) | | |
| Manukau | Barry Curtis (Ind) | | Len Brown (Ind) | | |
| Papakura | David Buist (Ind) | John Robertson (Ind) | Rick Pickard (Ind) | | |
| Franklin | Heather Maloney (Ind) | Mark Ball (Ind) | Graeme Deighton (Ind) | | |
| Thames-Coromandel | Chris Lux (Ind) | Phillipa Barriball (Ind) | Sally Christie (Ind) | | |
| Hauraki | Basil Morrison (Ind) | | Michael Hayden (Ind) | | |
| Waikato | Peter Harris (Ind) | | Lesley Syme (Ind) | | |
| Matamata-Piako | Hugh Vercoe (Ind) | | Noel Harvey-Webb (Ind) | | |
| Hamilton | David Braithwaite (Ind) | Michael Redman (Ind) | Martin Elliott (Ind) | | |
| Waipa | Alan Livingston (Ind) | | Stephen Lee (Ind) | | |
| Otorohanga | Eric Tait (Ind) | Dale Williams (Ind) | Sonya Hetet (Ind) | | |
| South Waikato | Gordon Blake (Ind) | Neil Sinclair (Ind) | Frances Campbell (Ind) | | |
| Waitomo | Allan Andrews (Ind) | Mark Ammon (Ind) | Christine Chaplow (Ind) | | |
| Taupō | Clayton Stent (Ind) | | Christine McElwee (Ind) | | |
| Western Bay of Plenty | Graeme Weld (Ind) | | Margaret Murray-Benge (Ind) | | |
| Tauranga | Jan Beange (Ind) | Stuart Crosby (Ind) | Jan Beange (Ind) | | |
| Rotorua | Grahame Hall (Ind) | Kevin Winters (Ind) | Trevor Maxwell (Ind) | | |
| Whakatane | Colin Hammond (Ind) | Colin Holmes (Ind) | Colin Hammond (Ind) | | |
| Kawerau | Malcolm Campbell (Ind) | | unopposed | | |
| Opotiki | John Forbes (Ind) | | ? (Ind) | | |
| Gisborne | Meng Foon (Ind) | | Tony Evans (Ind) | | |
| Wairoa | Les Probert (Ind) | | Gordon McIntyre (Ind) | | |
| Hastings | Lawrence Yule (Ind) | | unopposed | | |
| Napier | Barbara Arnott (Ind) | | Robin Gwynn (Ind) | | |
| Central Hawke's Bay | Tim Gilbertson (Ind) | | unopposed | | |
| New Plymouth | Peter Tennent (Ind) | | ? (Ind) | | |
| Stratford | Brian Jeffares (Ind) | | Milan Vukovich (Ind) | | |
| South Taranaki | Mary Bourke (Ind) | Ross Dunlop (Ind) | Jeffrey Ward (Ind) | | |
| Ruapehu | Sue Morris (Ind) | | Weston Kirton (Ind) | | |
| Wanganui | Chas Poynter (Ind) | Michael Laws (Ind) | John Martin (Ind) | | |
| Rangitikei | Bob Buchanan (Ind) | | John Vickers (Ind) | | |
| Manawatu | Ian McKelvie (Ind) | | ? (Ind) | | |
| Palmerston North | Mark Bell-Booth (Ind) | Heather Tanguay (Ind) | Mark Bell-Booth (Ind) | | |
| Tararua | Maureen Reynolds (Ind) | | ? (Ind) | | |
| Horowhenua | Tom Robinson (Ind) | | ? (Ind) | | |
| Kapiti Coast | Iride McCloy (Ind) | Alan Milne (Ind) | Nigel Wilson (Ind) | | |
| Porirua | Jenny Brash (Ind) | | Gregory Fortuin (Ind) | | |
| Upper Hutt | Wayne Guppy (Ind) | | Nicholas Kelly (Ind) | | |
| Lower Hutt | John Terris (Ind) | David Ogden (Ind) | John Terris (Ind) | Details | |
| Wellington | Kerry Prendergast (Ind) | | Bryan Pepperell (Ind) | Details | |
| Masterton | Bob Francis (Ind) | | Rod McKenzie (Ind) | | |
| Carterton | Martin Tankersley (Ind) | Gary McPhee (Ind) | Martin Tankersley (Ind) | | |
| South Wairarapa | John Read (Ind) | Adrienne Staples (Ind) | ? (Ind) | | |
| Tasman | John Hurley (Ind) | | Richard Johns (Ind) | | |
| Nelson | Paul Matheson (Ind) | | Gary Watson (Ind) | | |
| Marlborough | Tom Harrison (Ind) | Alistair Sowman (Ind) | Tom Harrison (Ind) | | |
| Buller | Pat O'Dea (Ind) | Martin Sawyers (Ind) | ? (Ind) | | |
| Grey | Kevin Brown (Ind) | | Kevin Brown (Ind) | | |
| Westland | John Drylie (Ind) | Maureen Pugh (Ind) | Margaret Moir (Ind) | | |
| Kaikoura | Jim Abernathy (Ind) | Kevin Heays (Ind) | Jim Abernathy (Ind) | | |
| Hurunui | Tony Arps (Ind) | Garry Jackson (Ind) | Tony Arps (Ind) | | |
| Waimakariri | Jim Gerard (Ind) | | unopposed | | |
| Christchurch | Garry Moore (Ind) | | Aaron Keown (Ind) | Details | |
| Banks Peninsula | Bob Parker (Ind) | | Jo Rolley (Ind) | | |
| Selwyn | Michael McEvedy (Ind) | | unopposed | | |
| Ashburton | Murray Anderson (Ind) | Bede O'Malley (Ind) | Murray Anderson (Ind) | | |
| Timaru | Wynne Raymond (Ind) | Janie Annear (Ind) | ? (Ind) | | |
| Mackenzie | Stan Scorringe (Ind) | Joel O'Neill (Ind) | John Gallagher (Ind) | | |
| Waimate | David Owen (Ind) | John Coles (Ind) | David Owen (Ind) | | |
| Waitaki | Alan McLay (Ind) | | ? (Ind) | | |
| Central Otago | Malcolm MacPherson (Ind) | | Edna McAtamney (Ind) | | |
| Queenstown-Lakes | Cleve Geddes (Ind) | | ? (Ind) | | |
| Dunedin | Sukhi Turner (Ind) | Peter Chin (Ind) | Malcom Farry (Ind) | Details | |
| Clutha | Juno Hayes (Ind) | | Bryan Cadogan (Ind) | | |
| Southland | Frana Cardno (Ind) | | ? (Ind) | | |
| Gore | Owen O'Connor (Ind) | Tracy Hicks (Ind) | Jeffrey Cunningham (Ind) | | |
| Invercargill | Tim Shadbolt (Ind) | | Alan Swallow (Ind) | Details | |
| Chatham Islands | Patrick Smith (Ind) | | ? (Ind) | | |

=== District health boards ===
Elections for the 21 district health boards (DHBs) were first held alongside the 2001 local elections. The government had hoped to use the STV voting method from the start but this could not be achieved and in 2001, first-past-the-post voting (FPP) was used based on local wards. For the 2004 elections, the STV method was used. From 2004 onwards, DHB candidates have been elected at large (i.e. across the whole voting area).
