= 2007 Auckland City mayoral election =

New Zealand mayoral election

- 13 October 2007
- Turnout: 111,759
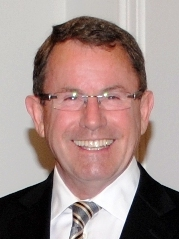

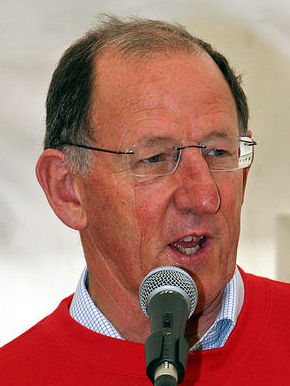
Candidate	John Banks	Dick Hubbard
Party	Independent	Independent
Popular vote	45,387	35,314
Percentage	40.6%	31.6%
Mayor before election
Dick Hubbard
Elected mayor
John Banks

The 2007 Auckland City mayoral election was part of the New Zealand local elections held that same year. In 2007, elections were held for the Mayor of Auckland plus other local government positions including nineteen city councillors. The polling was conducted using the standard first-past-the-post electoral method.

== Background ==
The election saw one-term Mayor Dick Hubbard defeated by his predecessor John Banks. Hubbard was the third consecutive mayor voted out after only one term and Banks became the first former mayor of Auckland to reclaim the position since Dove-Myer Robinson in 1968.

This was to be the last election for municipal offices to the Auckland City Council. By 2010 it had merged to become part of the new Auckland Council. Banks stood for the newly created office of Mayor of Auckland but lost to former mayor of Manukau City Len Brown.

== Mayoralty results ==
The following table gives the election results:

2007 Auckland mayoral election
Party	Candidate	Votes	%	±%
Independent	John Banks	45,387	40.61	+4.23
Independent	Dick Hubbard	35,314	31.59	−19.19
Independent	Alex Swney	10,677	9.55	
Independent	John Hinchcliff	5,151	4.60	
Independent	Steve Crow	5,101	4.56	
Independent	Elaine West	2,286	2.04	
Independent	Lisa Prager	2,183	1.95	
Christians Against Abortion	Phil O'Connor	1,087	0.97	+0.17
Independent	Glen Snelgar	836	0.74	
Communist League	Felicity Coggan	735	0.65	+0.30
Independent	Coralie Van Camp	716	0.64	
Independent	Scruff Ralph	712	0.63	
Independent	Raymond Presland	497	0.44	
Direct Democracy	Steve Taylor	438	0.39	
Independent	Susan Roberts	299	0.26	
Informal votes		340	0.30	+0.09
Majority		10,073	9.01	
Turnout		111,759		

== Ward results ==
Candidates were also elected from wards to the Auckland City Council.

Party/ticket	Councillors
Citizens & Ratepayers	11
City Vision	3
Labour	2
Independent	3

== Aftermath ==
Banks was mayor for one term. At the 2010 Auckland mayoral election, the first election after the Auckland Supercity was formed, he lost to Len Brown.
