= Stephen Berry (politician) =

New Zealand politician (born 1983)

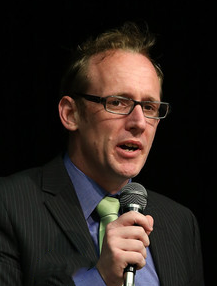
- Berry speaking in 2017
- Born: 14 February 1983 (age 43); Auckland, New Zealand
- Years active: 2002–2020 (as a political candidate)
- Political party: ACT New Zealand, formerly Libertarianz

Stephen Berry (born 14 February 1983) is a politician, YouTuber and perennial candidate in New Zealand national and local politics, who is known on running on right-wing positions.

== Biography ==
Berry calls himself a "Manurewa native". He attended St. Annes Primary School. He then attended Manurewa Intermediate and spent year 9 and 10 at James Cook High School, where he played cricket for Weymouth.

He ran as an independent candidate in the 2002 Mount Roskill general election and the 2011 Tāmaki general election. He served as spokesman of minor political party Libertarianz, running for Libertarianz in the 2004 Auckland City mayoral election. He also ran in the 2013 Auckland mayoral election for right-wing group Affordable Auckland, coming third with 13,650 votes.

He was leader of Affordable Auckland and criticised money spent on a private bathroom and dressing room hidden behind a bookcase being built behind Auckland Mayor Len Brown's new office. He called it "highly inappropriate and a really bad look". He demanded Len Brown's donors be made public, following a $273,375.22 donation from the New Auckland Council Trust. He criticised Auckland Transport for $41,500 spent on a party for 1700 staff and family at The Cloud, including entertainment from The X Factor winner Jackie Thomas. He said Auckland Transport wasn't hearing the clear message at the local body elections on responsible spending of ratepayers' money "when they throw enormous parties like this".

With Berry as leader, Affordable Auckland organised a "Stand Down Len Brown" march up Queen Street in February 2014, following Len Brown's sex scandal and a report that found he failed to declare more than $39,000 in free hotel rooms and upgrades. He and spokesman Will Ryan said the march was not so much about Mr Brown's private life as his undeclared activities and poor financial management. The protest attracted 300 people.

In the 2014 New Zealand general election, he ran for ACT in the Upper Harbour electorate and was 6th on the party list. He said "In 21st century New Zealand politics, homosexuality is so acceptable as to hardly be an issue at all." He also ran in the 2016 Auckland mayoral election. At the first Auckland mayoral debate, he said groups such as Auckland 2040 were "neighbourhood busybodies... artificially inflating the cost of property". He pulled out of the race and endorsed centre-right candidate John Palino.

In the 2017 New Zealand general election, he stood for ACT in the East Coast Bays electorate and was 5th on the party list. He said he would abolish the Rural Urban Boundary and open up space for 600,000 homes to impact the price of housing. He also said he would scrap the Resource Management Act. He served as ACT's 2017 spokesperson for Health and LGBT issues. During the election, he defended hate speech against transgender people as a right. Following these comments, he was booed and laughed at by the audience at an election forum in Wellington, hosted by Rainbow Wellington. He said a colleague had told him it was easier to come out as gay in the ACT Party than it was to come out as an ACT supporter amongst gay friends.

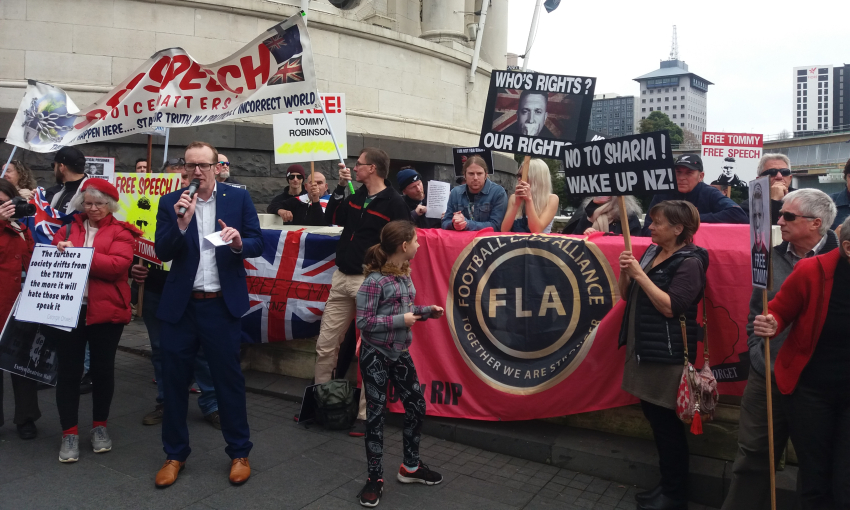
Berry speaking at the Free Speech Coalition protest, Auckland 2018

He spoke at the Free Speech Coalition protest in July 2018, following far-right Canadian activists Stefan Molyneux and Lauren Southern being denied an Auckland Council venue and unable to secure a venue for their New Zealand tour. He said "Look the thing about free speech is that we've all got that in common. We've got different reasons for it being in common."

He ran for ACT in the 2018 Northcote by-election, achieving fourth place. Berry's dream for Northcote was a new six-lane motorway over the harbour at Point Chevalier, revived from a 1972 Ministry of Works plan, to fix the Onewa Road congestion. This would be funded by using $58 billion raised by putting up the age to receive superannuation to 67. Tackling traffic congestion in Northcote was a priority for Berry in this race.

In the 2020 New Zealand general election, he contested the Pakuranga electorate for ACT and was ninth on the party list, but resigned from running in September 2020, citing "physical exhaustion". He was the only openly gay representative of ACT at the time. He was ninth on the ACT Party list and ACT New Zealand got 10 seats, which means if he had stayed in the race and ACT got the same result, then he would have been elected as Member of Parliament. After resigning as a candidate in the 2020 general election, he has finished with politics and now hosts the Mr Berry Mr Berry show on YouTube, where he shares political commentary and clips from his stand-up comedy routines. The show last screened in 2022 to 98 viewers, 1/3 of his subscriber base.

In January 2021, he was permanently suspended from Twitter. This was part of the culling of more than 70,000 "QAnon-related accounts", including President Donald Trump, following the 2021 storming of the United States Capitol. He said he did not approve of what Twitter was doing, but he said Twitter owns the platform and has the right to do as it wishes, even if it's something he disagrees with.

In 2025, Berry spoke against his former high school James Cook High School changing its name to Te Haikura a Kiwa. He called it "window dressing."

== Personal life ==
Berry is gay and an atheist. In 2018, he lived in Forrest Hill on Auckland's North Shore with his husband. He was also a manager for a supermarket chain.

== Electoral history ==
=== 2002 Mount Roskill general election ===
2002 general election: Mount Roskill
Notes:	Blue background denotes the winner of the electorate vote. Pink background denotes a candidate elected from their party list. Yellow background denotes an electorate win by a list member, or other incumbent. A ✓ or ✗ denotes status of any incumbent, win or lose respectively.						
Party	Candidate	Votes	%	±%	Party votes	%	±%
Labour	✓ Phil Goff	18,702	64.40	+6.13	14,866	49.73	+3.98
National	Brent Trewheela	4,987	17.17		5,126	17.15	−10.50
ACT	Kenneth Wang	1,494	5.14		2,351	7.86	+1.17
NZ First	Dawn Mullins	1,301	4.48		2,329	7.79	+4.49
United Future	Bernie Ogilvy	1,253	4.31		2,162	7.23	
Christian Heritage	Ewen McQueen	582	2.00		425	1.42	−2.19
Alliance	Brendon Lane	337	1.16		357	1.19	−5.11
Progressive	Trevor Lance Barnard	229	0.79		446	1.49	
Independent	Stephen Berry	157	0.54				
Green					1,577	5.28	+1.53
ORNZ					121	0.40	
Legalise Cannabis					109	0.36	−0.12
One NZ					12	0.04	+0.01
Mana Māori					10	0.03	−0.04
NMP					4	0.01	−0.01
Informal votes		354			124		
Total valid votes		29,042			29,895		
Labour hold	Majority	13,715	47.23	+16.61			

=== 2004 Auckland City mayoral election ===
2004 Auckland mayoral election
Party	Candidate	Votes	%	±%
Independent	Dick Hubbard	62,751	50.78	
Independent	John Banks	44,964	36.38	−7.22
Independent	Christine Fletcher	12,501	10.11	−19.26
Christians Against Abortion	Phil O'Connor	990	0.80	−0.36
Libertarianz	Stephen Berry	952	0.77	
Anti-Capitalist Alliance	Daphna Whitmore	706	0.57	
Communist League	Felicity Coggan	441	0.35	−0.21
Informal votes		262	0.21	+0.03
Majority		17,787	14.39	
Turnout		123,567		

=== 2011 Tāmaki general election ===
2011 general election: Tamaki
Notes:	Blue background denotes the winner of the electorate vote. Pink background denotes a candidate elected from their party list. Yellow background denotes an electorate win by a list member, or other incumbent. A ✓ or ✗ denotes status of any incumbent, win or lose respectively.						
Party	Candidate	Votes	%	±%	Party votes	%	±%
National	Simon O'Connor	24,837	67.67	+1.93	24,338	64.42	+4.19
Labour	Nick Iusitini Bakulich	7,051	19.21	−1.53	6,642	17.58	−3.58
Green	Richard Leckinger	2,861	7.80	+1.94	3,314	8.77	+3.48
ACT	John Boscawen	887	2.39	−2.06	893	2.36	−5.56
Conservative	Litia Simpson	567	1.54	+1.54	575	1.52	+1.52
Independent	Wayne Young	358	0.98	+0.98			
Independent	Stephen Berry	152	0.41	+0.41			
NZ First					1,421	3.76	+1.29
Māori Party					193	0.51	−0.01
United Future					156	0.41	−0.35
Legalise Cannabis					107	0.28	+0.11
Mana					102	0.27	+0.27
Libertarianz					30	0.08	+0.03
Alliance					6	0.02	-0.002
Democrats					5	0.01	+0.01
Informal votes		755			255		
Total valid votes		36,703			37,782		
Turnout		38,037	77.50				
National hold	Majority	17,786	48.46	+3.45			

=== 2013 Auckland mayoral election ===
2013 Auckland mayoral election
Party	Candidate	Votes	%	±%
Independent	Len Brown	164,338	47.78	−1.46
Independent	John Palino	108,928	31.67	—
Affordable Auckland	Stephen Berry	13,650	3.97	—
Independent	Penny Bright	11,723	3.41	+2.85
Mana	John Minto	11,591	3.37	—
Independent	Uesifili Unasa	8,040	2.34	—
Working for the Homeless	Wayne Young	3,943	1.15	+1.03
Independent	Reuben Shadbolt	3,152	0.92	—
None	Paul Duffy	3,083	0.90	—
Christians Against Abortion	Phil O'Connor	3,032	0.88	+0.61
Independent	Emmett Hussey	2,974	0.86	—
Independent	Susanna Susara Kruger	2,173	0.63	—
None	Matthew Goode	2,116	0.62	—
Roads First	David Willmott	1,647	0.48	+0.37
None	Jesse Butler	1,465	0.43	—
None	Tricia Cheel	1,214	0.35	—
Communist League	Annalucia Vermunt	856	0.25	+0.16
Majority		55,410	16.11	+2.44
Total valid votes		343,925	99.54	
Informal votes		1,584	0.46	
Turnout		345,509	34.72	−15.45
Registered electors		995,206		

=== 2013 Auckland local elections (Waitemata and Gulf ward) ===
Affiliation (if any)	Name	Votes
Independent	Mike Lee	8886
Independent	Greg Moyle	4061
Independent	Rob Thomas	3155
Affordable Auckland	Stephen Berry	1435
Independent	Charlotte Fisher	1055
Independent	Aleksandar Zivaljevic	398
	Informal/blank	1578

=== 2014 Upper Harbour general election ===
2014 general election: Upper Harbour
Notes:	Blue background denotes the winner of the electorate vote. Pink background denotes a candidate elected from their party list. Yellow background denotes an electorate win by a list member, or other incumbent. A ✓ or ✗ denotes status of any incumbent, win or lose respectively.						
Party	Candidate	Votes	%	±%	Party votes	%	±%
National	Paula Bennett	18,315	55.95	—	20,853	54.25	—
Labour	Hermann Retzlaff	8,623	26.34	—	4,965	23.36	—
Green	Nicholas Mayne	2,619	8.00	—	2,329	6.97	—
Conservative	Callum Blair	1,839	5.61	—	1,613	4.82	—
ACT	Stephen Berry	549	1.67	—	450	1.34	—
Māori Party	Hinurewa Te Hau	246	0.75	—	119	0.35	—
Mana Party	Makelesi Ngata	204	0.62	—			
NZ First					2,311	6.91	—
Internet Mana					432	0.85	—
Legalise Cannabis					129	0.38	—
United Future					69	0.20	—
Civilian					14	0.04	—
Ban 1080					13	0.03	—
Independent Coalition					7	0.02	—
Focus					4	0.01	—
Democrats					4	0.01	—
Informal votes		338			130		
Total valid votes		32,733			33,403		
Turnout		33,420	73.42	—			
National win new seat	Majority	9,692	29.61				

=== 2017 East Coast Bays general election ===
2017 general election: East Coast Bays
Notes:	Blue background denotes the winner of the electorate vote. Pink background denotes a candidate elected from their party list. Yellow background denotes an electorate win by a list member, or other incumbent. A ✓ or ✗ denotes status of any incumbent, win or lose respectively.						
Party	Candidate	Votes	%	±%	Party votes	%	±%
National	Erica Stanford	22,731	65.53	+3.61	22,006	62.78	−0.60
Labour	Naisi Chen	6,441	18.57	+3.30	8,130	23.20	+11.05
Green	Nicholas Mayne	2,306	6.65	−3.30	1,660	4.74	−3.49
Opportunities	Teresa Moore	1,289	3.72	—	673	1.92	—
NZ First	Ilja Ruppeldt	1,254	3.62	—	1,886	5.38	−0.58
ACT	Stephen Berry	389	1.12	—	347	1.00	−4.96
Conservative					95	0.27	−6.43
Legalise Cannabis					58	0.17	−0.12
Māori Party					55	0.16	+0.12
United Future					34	0.10	−0.11
People's Party					18	0.05	—
Outdoors					14	0.04	—
Democrats					6	0.02	−0.03
Mana Party					5	0.01	—
Ban 1080					5	0.01	−0.13
Internet					4	0.01	—
Informal votes		277			154		
Total valid votes		34,687			35,050		
National hold	Majority	16,290	46.96	+0.30			

=== 2018 Northcote by-election ===
The following table shows final by-election results:

2018 Northcote by-election
Notes: Blue background denotes the winner of the by-election. Pink background denotes a candidate elected from their party list prior to the by-election. Yellow background denotes the winner of the by-election, who was a list MP prior to the by-election. A ✓ or ✗ denotes status of any incumbent, win or lose respectively.
Party	Candidate	Votes	%	±%
National	Dan Bidois	10,566	50.67	
Labour	Shanan Halbert	9,256	44.39	+9.14
Green	Rebekah Jaung	615	2.94	−3.79
ACT	Stephen Berry	166	0.79	
Independent	Kym Koloni	97	0.46	−3.27
Legalise Cannabis	Jeff Lye	89	0.42	
Democrats	Tricia Cheel	31	0.14	−0.11
Not A Party	Liam Walsh	5	0.02	
Informal votes		25	0.11	
Majority		1,310	6.28	
Turnout		20,850	43.59	−33.98
