= 2004 Auckland City mayoral election =

New Zealand mayoral election

- 10 October 2004
- Turnout: 123,567
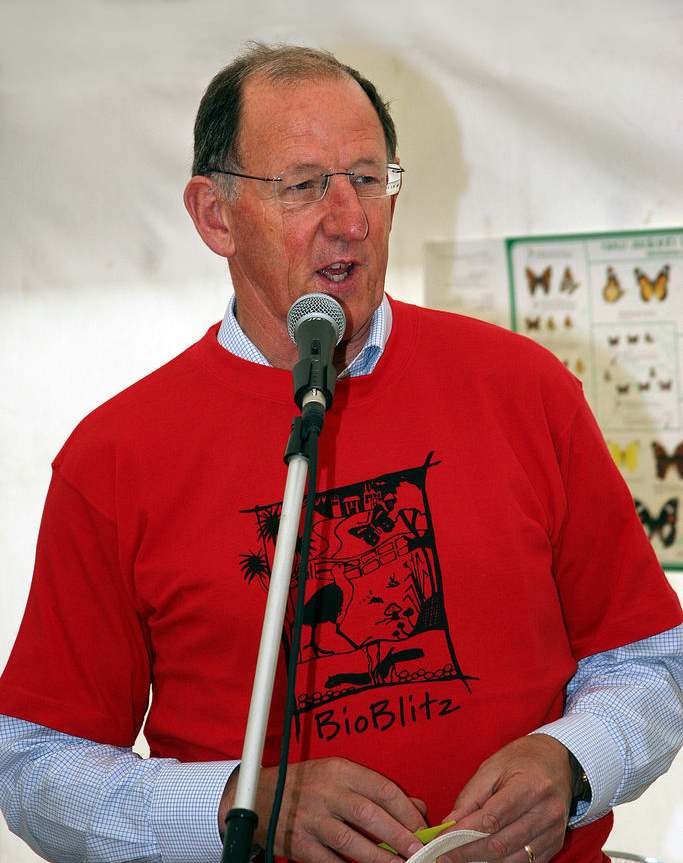

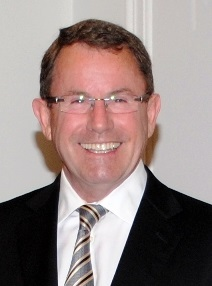
Candidate	Dick Hubbard	John Banks
Party	Independent	Independent
Popular vote	62,751	44,964
Percentage	50.78	36.38
Mayor before election
John Banks
Elected mayor
Dick Hubbard

The 2004 Auckland City mayoral election was part of the New Zealand local elections held that same year. In 2004, elections were held for the Mayor of Auckland plus other local government positions including nineteen city councillors. The polling was conducted using the standard first-past-the-post electoral method.

== Mayoralty results ==
The following table gives the election results:

2004 Auckland mayoral election
Party	Candidate	Votes	%	±%
Independent	Dick Hubbard	62,751	50.78	
Independent	John Banks	44,964	36.38	−7.22
Independent	Christine Fletcher	12,501	10.11	−19.26
Christians Against Abortion	Phil O'Connor	990	0.80	−0.36
Libertarianz	Stephen Berry	952	0.77	
Anti-Capitalist Alliance	Daphna Whitmore	706	0.57	
Communist League	Felicity Coggan	441	0.35	−0.21
Informal votes		262	0.21	+0.03
Majority		17,787	14.39	
Turnout		123,567		

== Ward results ==
Candidates were also elected from wards to the Auckland City Council.

Party/ticket	Councillors
City Vision	6
Citizens & Ratepayers	6
Labour	3
Action Hobson	2
Independent	2
