= Graham McCready =

- Occupation: retired accountant
- Known for: successfully taking private prosecutions against MPs

Graham McCready is a retired New Zealand accountant, known for successfully taking a private prosecution against MP Trevor Mallard.

== Early life ==
McCready is the youngest of four children, and the son of an Irish wharf worker.

== Career ==
Among other things, McCready has worked as an engineer in the Royal New Zealand Air Force, as a computer technician for a Canadian airline, and as a clerk at Wellington City Council.

== Private prosecutions ==
=== Trevor Mallard prosecution ===
In November 2007 he took a private prosecution against Labour Party MP Trevor Mallard for fighting in a public place. The prosecution arose after Mallard had a fight with National Party MP Tau Henare in Parliament. Mallard eventually pleaded guilty to a charge of fighting in a public place and was ordered to donate $500 to charity. McCready said he was happy with the outcome.

=== John Banks prosecution ===
McCready took a private prosecution against ACT Party MP John Banks over filing a false electoral return in the 2010 Auckland mayoral election, after the New Zealand police decided there wasn't sufficient evidence to prosecute Banks. McCready's prosecution was taken over by the Crown before it went to trial.

In June 2014, Banks was found guilty by a judge of filing a false electoral return. McCready said he was ecstatic with the outcome. He said that he pursued Banks as a matter of principle, because he believes that everyone in a democracy should be accountable for their actions.

In February 2014, before the outcome of the case was known, McCready applied to the court for $10,000–$20,000 in costs for almost a year's work on the case. He wanted either Banks or the Crown to pay the bill, with the proceeds going to himself and charity.

In June 2014, McCready filed further charges in relation to the Banks case, this time targeting Prime Minister John Key, a police officer, and Banks again. His contention is that Key "conspired to defeat the course of justice by ensuring Banks was not prosecuted by the police" and that he was an accessory by being wilfully blind to the contents of the police report. McCready rejected suggestions that his prosecutions were a waste of time, saying "that's what the courts are there for. I'm not a serial litigant, I'm New Zealand's private prosecutor who is representing the public".

In November 2014, the Court of Appeal set aside the original guilty verdict and ordered a retrial. The reason for the verdict being set aside was due to new evidence being made aware to the court regarding the money under question. A retrial date had been set for July 2015 but the case was ultimately quashed by the Court of Appeal on 19 May 2015 when it was revealed a memorandum setting out evidence by some witnesses was subsequently contradicted by themselves had been held back from Banks' legal team and that this evidence meant the new trial was untenable.

=== John Key and others ===
In July 2014, McCready filed a private prosecution in Auckland's District Court. Court documents name 10 defendants and 22 proposed charges. The defendants include Prime Minister John Key, as well as four police officers including Detective Inspector Mark Benefield, a QC, and a judicial officer.

=== Other prosecutions ===
In December 2013, McCready announced that he was planning a private prosecution for manslaughter against former head of Pike River Mine Peter Whitall. He planned to go ahead with the prosecution after talking to the families of the mine workers who died in the Pike River Mine disaster. In February 2013, McCready set up a private prosecution service called the New Zealand Private Prosecution Service, which he intended to be a watchdog for consumers.

== Convictions ==
In 2006, McCready was sentenced to 75 hours community service after he traded while bankrupt.

In 2009, McCready was convicted on charges on charges of making false tax returns involving $183,155. He was sentenced to six months' home detention.

In 2013, McCready was convicted of blackmailing a company director and sentenced to six months' community detention. He wrote in an apology to the victim that: "My conduct was criminal, unnecessary, and I am sure caused you some considerable distress." Although he escaped jail time, he was unable to pay the court costs and as a consequence was bankrupted.

== Involvement in local government ==
In the Wellington 2013 local government elections, McCready stood as an independent candidate for the Eastern Ward. His campaign centred on extending Wellington airport's runway, upgrading council housing, and extending free public transport for Super Gold card holders. He was not elected, receiving 239 votes.

== Personal life ==
While working at the Wellington City Council he claimed to have developed chronic occupational overuse syndrome. He has been on a benefit since 1995, and lives in a council-subsidised flat in Miramar.
