= Caughey =

Caughey is a surname. Notable people with the surname include:

- Catherine Caughey (née Harvey, 1923–2008), Colossus computer operator at Bletchley Park during World War II
- Christine Caughey, former City Councillor in Auckland City, New Zealand, for the Action Hobson ticket
- Mark Caughey (born 1960), former Northern Irish association football striker
- Seán Caughey (died 2010), Northern Ireland politician

== See also ==
- Caughey Western History Association Prize, given annually to the best book published the previous year on the American West
- Smith & Caughey's, mid-sized department store chain in New Zealand
- Thomas K. Caughey Dynamics Award, award given annually by the Applied Mechanics Division, of American Society of Mechanical Engineers (ASME)
