= Action Hobson =

Action Hobson was a centrist council ticket in the Hobson Ward of Auckland City, New Zealand. The ticket was formed to combat the proposed Eastern Transport Corridor being proposed by Mayor of Auckland City, John Banks, and his supporting Citizens and Ratepayers Now (centre-right) bloc.

== History ==
In the October 2004 election, Action Hobson were successful in electing two councillors, Christine Caughey and Richard Simpson and a majority on the local Hobson Community Board.

After the 2004 election, Action Hobson's two councillors came under significant criticism for breaking their promises on council rates. In the leadup to the election, they had promised to be conservative and cap rates to inflation. However, Action Hobson's support for City Vision saw rates increases of 9.7% in 2005 and 13.2% in 2006, causing a backlash with voters.

Action Hobson also placed an emphasis on heritage policy as a part of their broad direction.

In the October 2007 election, Action Hobson's candidates were all defeated, as part of a broad swing to the centre-right.
