= Hubbard Foods =

New Zealand breakfast cereal maker

Coordinates: 36.94887°S 174.79589°E

Hubbard Foods Ltd
- Type: Private
- Industry: Food
- Founded: 1990
- Headquarters: Auckland, New Zealand
- Key people: Dick Hubbard, Founder
- Products: Fruitful Breakfast; Berry Berry Nice; Big Breakfast
- Number of employees: 150
- Website: hubbards.co.nz

Hubbard Foods Ltd is a manufacturer of breakfast cereals based in Auckland, New Zealand. It operates under the Hubbard brand as well as producing for private labels. Hubbard Foods Ltd was founded by Dick Hubbard, who temporarily stepped down as CEO from 2004 to 2007 to serve as the mayor of Auckland.

As reported by The Sunday Star-Times in July 2010. The company is noted as the third significant player in the New Zealand 'ready-to-eat' cereal market, following Sanitarium and Kellogg's. Currently employs approximately 150 people.

== History ==
Established in 1989 as Winner Foods, the company underwent a name change after two years, with the founder opting to use the family name on cereal boxes and renaming it Hubbard Foods Ltd. In 2008, there was contemplation of selling the company, but the decision was made to retain ownership.

In 2010, a notable initiative took place as Hubbard Foods, in collaboration with Vector Limited, installed the largest commercial thin-film solar PV panel system in New Zealand on the roof of its South Auckland building.

Subsequently, in 2018, the company transitioned ownership to HFG Group, later rebranded as Walter & Wild under the ownership of Harry Hart and his father Graeme Hart.
