= 2004 Lower Hutt mayoral election =

- 9 October 2004
- Turnout: 24,736 (37.00%)
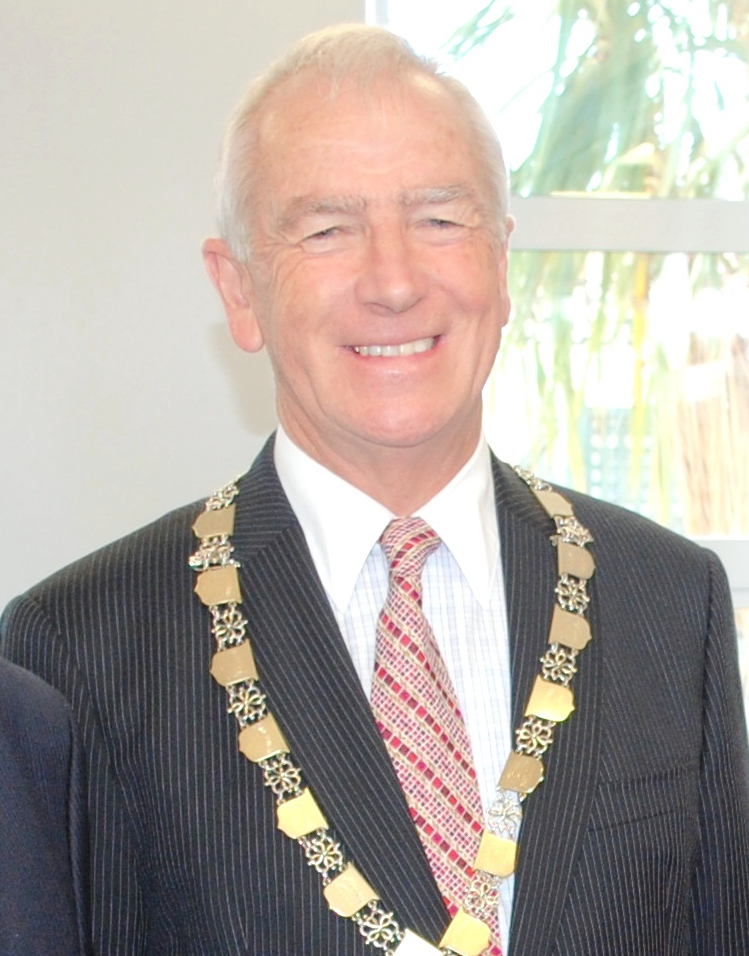

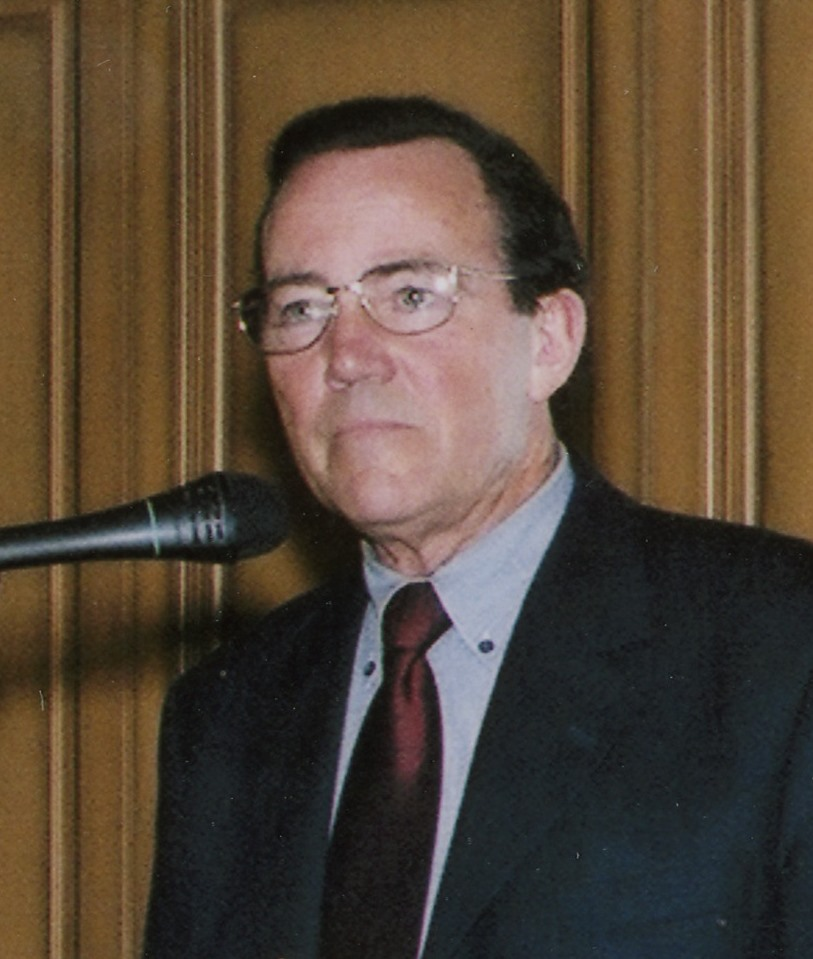

Candidate	David Ogden	John Terris	Scott Dalziell
Party	Independent	Independent	Hutt 2020 - Labour
Popular vote	10,272	8,409	3,718
Percentage	41.52	33.99	15.03
Mayor before election
John Terris
Elected mayor
David Ogden

The 2004 Lower Hutt mayoral election was part of the wider 2004 New Zealand local elections. The elections were held for the role of Mayor of Lower Hutt plus other local government positions including eleven city councillors, also elected triennially. The polling was conducted using the standard first-past-the-post electoral method.

== Background ==
The incumbent Mayor, John Terris, stood for a fourth term. He was opposed by Eastern Ward councillor Scott Dalziel and former councillor David Ogden. Ogden and Terris were previously political allies though came to differ on policy issues, particularly over council debt and rates. Terris' campaign suffered greatly when was hospitalised with blood poisoning at the start of the election leaving him little time or energy to campaign.

== Mayoral results ==
2004 Lower Hutt mayoral election
Party	Candidate	Votes	%	±%
Independent	David Ogden	10,272	41.52	
Independent	John Terris	8,409	33.99	−23.22
Hutt 2020 - Labour	Scott Dalziel	3,718	15.03	−22.84
Independent	Stu Carlson	2,254	9.11	
Informal votes		83	0.33	−4.58
Majority		1,863	7.53	
Turnout		24,736	37.00	−8.76

== Ward results ==
Eleven candidates were also elected from wards to the Hutt City Council.

Party/ticket	Councillors
Independent	7
City Vision	3
Hutt 2020 - Labour	1
