= Manurewa Intermediate =

Location
- 76 Russell Rd, Manurewa, Auckland, New Zealand; 37.0227°S 174.8847°E

Information
- Type: Year 7 & 8 Intermediate School
- Motto: All the time, Everytime, all of us, Everywhere!
- Established: 1961
- Ministry of Education Institution no.: 1353
- Principal: Mr Iain Taylor
- Enrolment: 929 (July 2026)
- Socio-economic decile: 1
- Website: manurewaint.school.nz

Manurewa Intermediate School is a multicultural school, located in central Manurewa, a suburb of Auckland's Manukau City, New Zealand.

== History ==
Manurewa Intermediate School opened in February 1961, and was the first intermediate school in the Manurewa area. The school won the Prime Minister's Education Excellence Awards in the Leadership Team category in 2017.

== Culture ==
The school draws from a large range of cultural and socio-economic backgrounds. This has led to the formation of several cultural groups within the school.

The Music Technology complex was opened in October 2000 by The Prime Minister of New Zealand Helen Clark.

Manurewa Intermediate also has a Morning Live school News, called MITV. It has useful information for students at the school (for example: fitness, meetings, and trips). It is hosted and mainly run by students of the school.

== Notable alumni ==
- Stephen Berry (born 1983), politician and political commentator
