= Gustavia Lui =

New Zealand businesswoman (born c.1998)

Gustavia Nia Lui (born c. 1988) is a New Zealand businesswoman of Samoan and Tuvaluan descent. She is the founder and owner of Staavias, a footwear company specialising in plus-sized shoes for women.

== Early life ==
Lui was born in Wellington and grew up in South Auckland, New Zealand, with nine brothers and two sisters. She attended James Cook High School, leaving when she was 14 years old, had her first child when she was 16 years old, and got married when she was 19.

== Career ==
After working in office jobs, including for Work and Income New Zealand, and struggling to find professional footwear in her size, Lui decided to start a shoe design business. In 2013, she applied for and received the AMP Scholarship People's Choice Award, and used the prize money to travel to China, Las Vegas and New York City, and to buy equipment and supplies. Lui launched her company as an online store in January 2016.
