= Andromeda (2015 yacht) =

Luxury expedition yacht

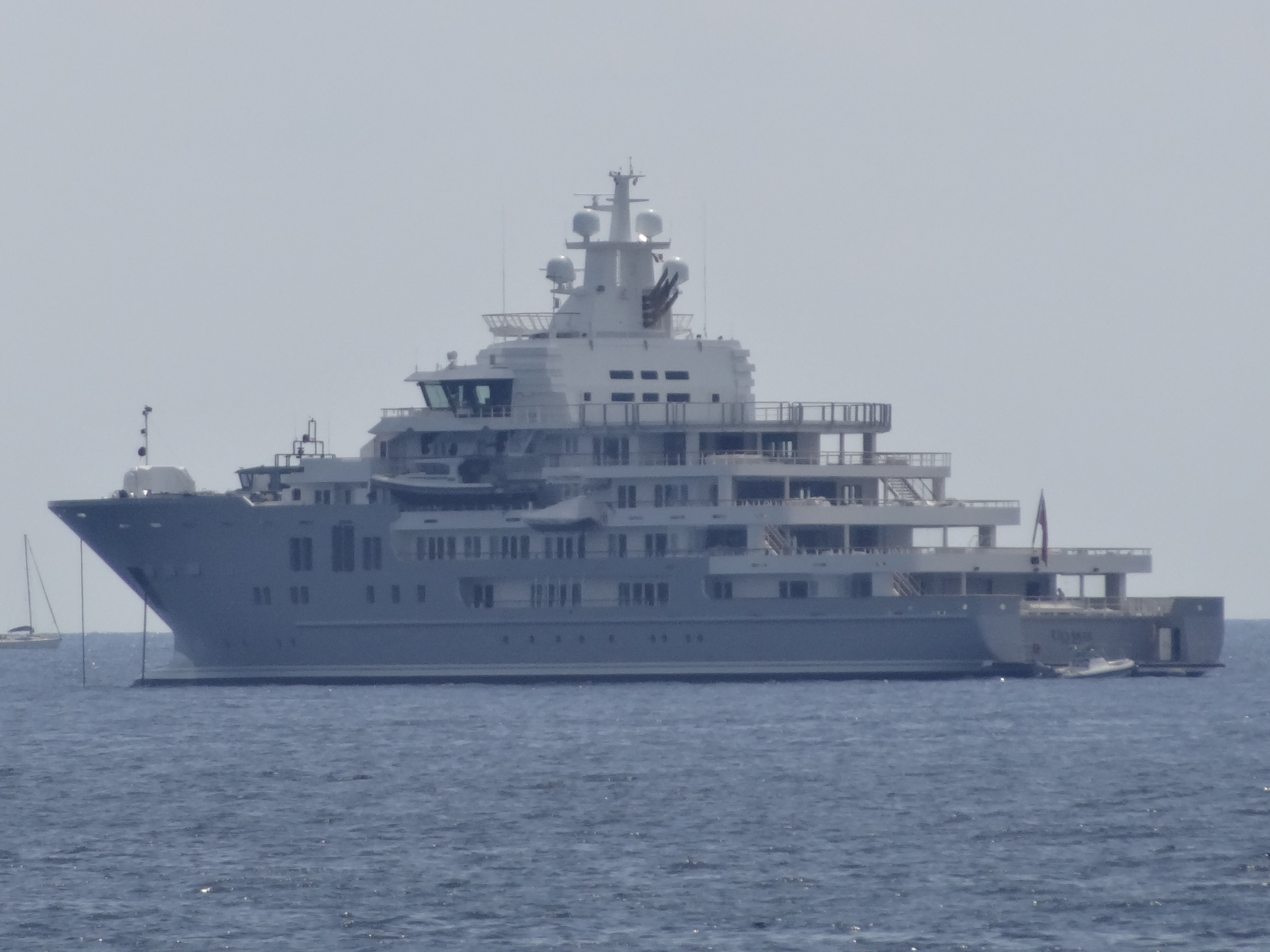
- As Ulysses while off the coast of Antibes in August 2016

History
- Name: Ulysses (2015–2018); Andromeda (2018–present)
- Owner: see Ownership
- Port of registry: Cayman Islands
- Builder: Kleven Maritime AS
- Yard number: 366
- Launched: 2015
- In service: 2016
- Identification: IMO number: 9692545; MMSI number: 319879000; Callsign: ZGES2

General characteristics
- Class & type: Motor yacht
- Tonnage: 5,937 GT
- Length: 107.39 m (352 ft 4 in)
- Beam: 18.01 m (59 ft 1 in)
- Draft: 5.011 m (16 ft 5.3 in)
- Propulsion: 6 × Caterpillar DE 3516 diesel engines
- Speed: 16 knots (30 km/h; 18 mph) (max)
- Capacity: 30 passengers
- Crew: 43

Andromeda is a 107.39-metre (352 ft 4 in) luxury expedition yacht constructed for the New Zealand billionaire Graeme Hart. Launched in 2015 and completed in 2016, the vessel was initially named Ulyssess by Hart. The vessel was reportedly sold in 2017 to Yuri Milner and renamed Andromeda.

== Description ==
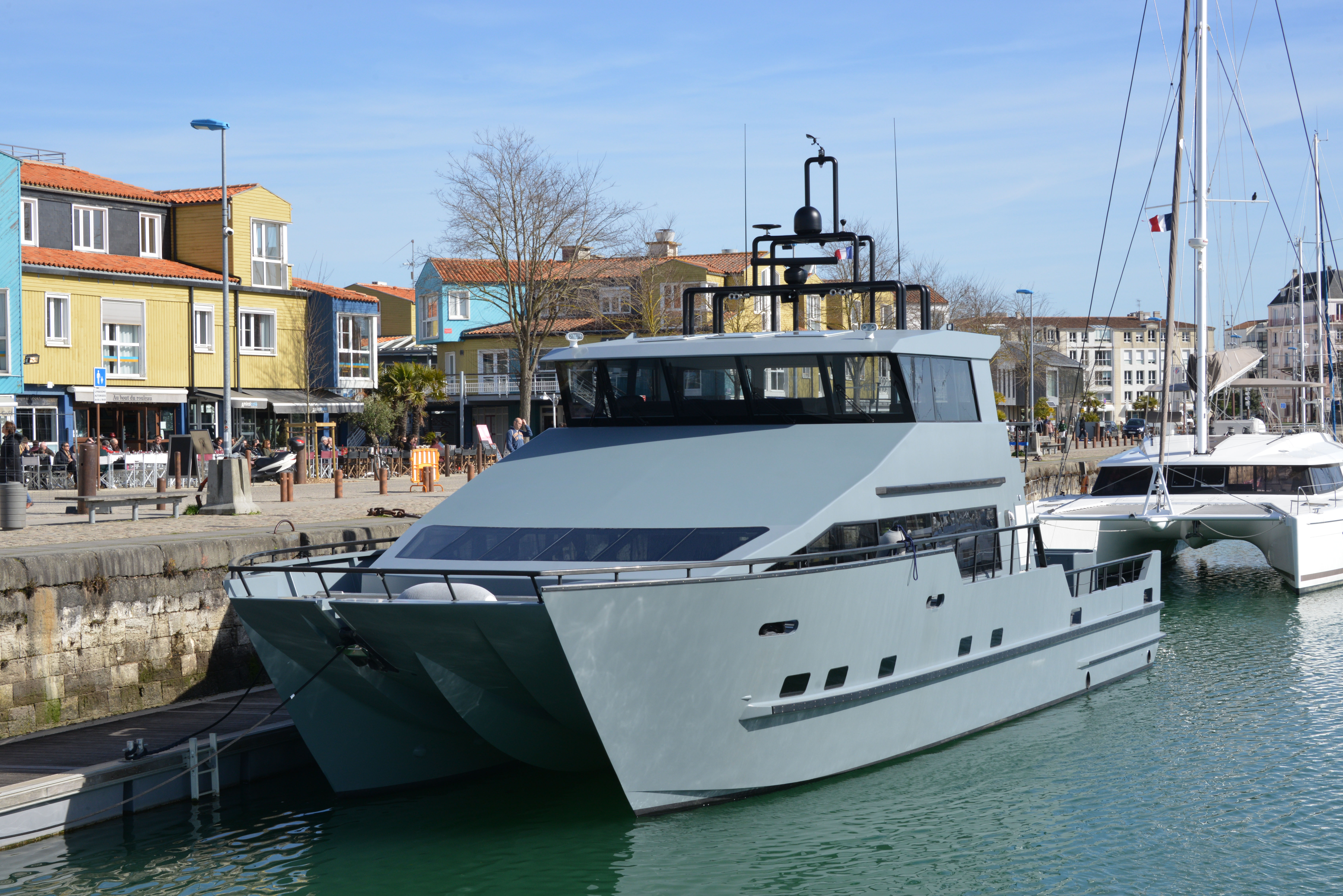
One of the large tenders of Andromeda

Andromeda is a luxury expedition yacht with a 5,937 gross tonnage (GT). The yacht measures 107.39-meter (352 ft 4 in) long with a Beam of 18.01 m (59 ft 1 in) and a draft of 5.011 m (16 ft 5.3 in). The vessel is powered by six Caterpillar DE 3516 diesel engines giving the yacht a maximum speed of 16.4 knots (30.4 km/h; 18.9 mph) and an economical range of 8,500 nautical miles (15,700 km; 9,800 mi). The ship is equipped with three 550 kW Caterpillar C18 electric generators for power generation. Andromeda is equipped with a helipad and hangar for a helicopter.

The vessel has a crew of 43, has 15 staterooms and capacity for 30 passengers.

== Construction and career ==
The yacht was constructed by Kleven Maritime AS with the yard number 366 for New Zealand billionaire Graeme Hart, under the name Ulysses. The vessel was launched in 2015 and was completed in 2016. The 107-metre Ulysses arrived in Bremerhaven, Germany in August 2015, where she was finished at Stahlbau Nord, under supervision of Dörries Maritime Services.

The yacht was sold to an unnamed buyer in October 2017 by Fraser Yachts. In March 2018, her name was changed to Andromeda. During 2017-2018, the vessel spent the winter months of the northern hemisphere completing sea trials, then set sail across the Pacific, arriving in Singapore on 6 March.

Andromeda's builder, Kleven, built a second expedition yacht for Hart, 116 m (380 ft 7 in) in length. It is named Ulysses, for an estimated cost of 275 millions $, and was delivered in late 2017.

== Ownership ==
When Hart sold Andromeda, it was widely reported that Yuri Milner purchased her. While some sources maintain, with evidence, that Milner is the owner, a spokesperson for him has denied it. In March 2022, Forbes reported Andromeda as owned by Milner, that she was registered in the Cayman Islands, and she was valued at US$129 million. On 13 April 2022, she was recorded in the Seychelles.

== See also ==
- List of motor yachts by length
