= Christine Caughey =

New Zealand politician

Christine Caughey is a former City Councillor in Auckland City, New Zealand, for the Action Hobson ticket. She was successful on gaining election in the 2004 local body elections on an anti-motorway platform.

She was awarded Metro Magazine's Aucklander of the Year in 2004, primarily for the role she played in politically defeating the Eastern Transport Corridor roading element that was proposed for Hobson Bay by the Waitematā Harbour.

Caughey had unsuccessfully stood for City Vision in a community board by-election in 2003. Caughey stood again in the Hobson ward for the 2007 local body elections, but was defeated along with all other members of her Action Hobson team.

In July 2008, Caughey was appointed by the Government to the board of the NZ Transport Agency.

She is also an Auckland Waterfront Development Agency Board Member.
