= 2004 Wellington City Council election =

Local election in New Zealand

- 9 October 2004
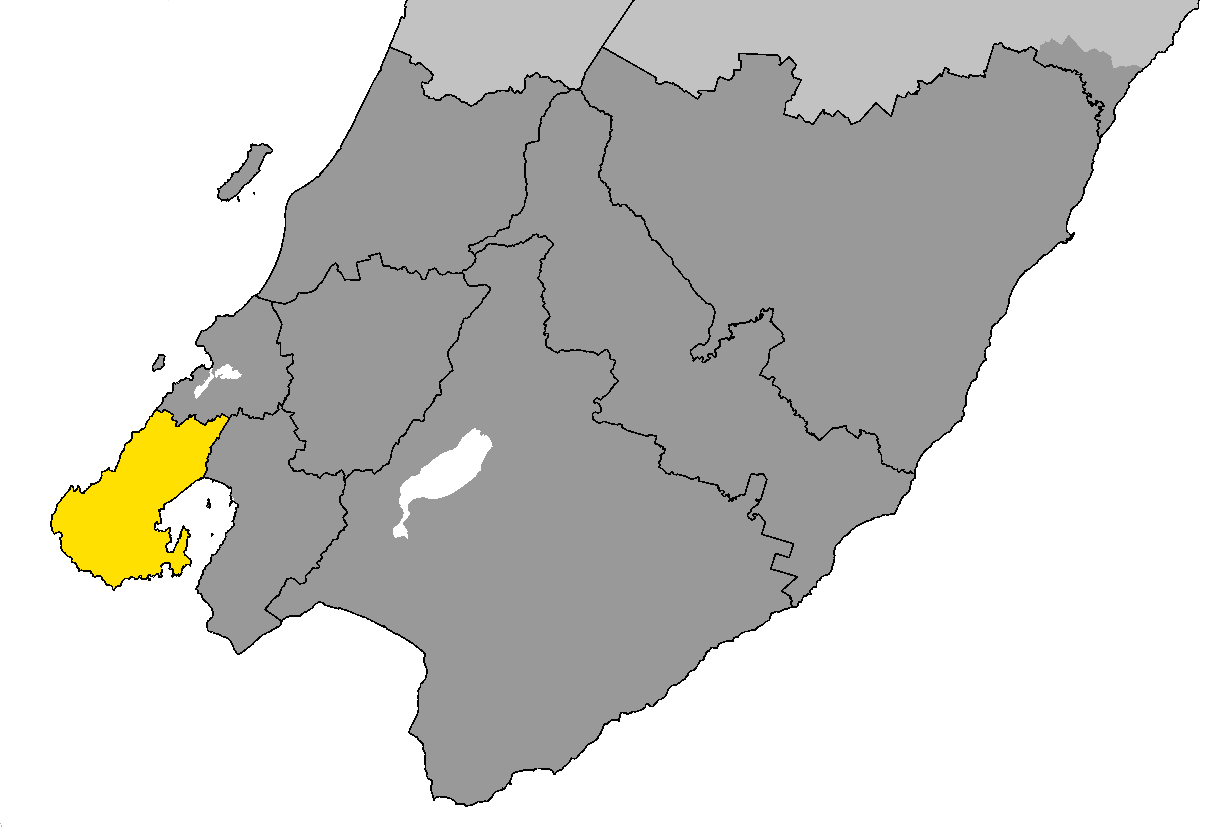
- Position of Wellington City within Wellington Region

The 2004 Wellington City Council election was part of the 2004 New Zealand local elections, to elect members to sub-national councils and boards.

== Council ==
The Wellington City Council consists of a mayor and fourteen councillors elected from five wards (Northern, Onslow-Western, Lambton, Eastern, Southern) using the Single Transferable Vote system.

=== Mayor ===
2004 Wellington mayoral election
Party	Candidate	FPv%	Count				
Party	Candidate	FPv%	1	2	3	4	5
Independent	Kerry Prendergast	42.39	22,069	22,200	23,170	23,926	27,002
Independent	Bryan Pepperell	15.35	7,993	8,274	10,448	14,220	18,115
Independent	Rob Goulden	14.79	7,703	7,868	9,334	10,388	
Independent	Timothy O'Brien	12.60	6,560	6,778	7,537		
Independent	Jack Ruben	12.57	6,547	6,724			
Anti-Capitalist Alliance	Stephen Hay	2.30	1,195				
Valid: 52,067 Spoilt: 268 Quota: 22,559

=== Eastern ward ===
The Eastern ward returns three councillors to the Wellington City Council. The final iteration of results for the ward were:

Eastern Ward (3 vacancies)
Party	Candidate	Votes	%	±%
Independent	Ray Ahipene-Mercer	2,858		
Labour	Leonie Gill	2,616		
Independent	Rob Goulden	2,471		
Independent	David Major	1,978		
Independent	Chris Anastasiadis	1,334		
Independent	Phil Sprey	208		
Informal votes		168		
Turnout		10,502		

=== Lambton ward ===
The Lambton ward returns three councillors to the Wellington City Council. The final iteration of results for the ward were:

Lambton Ward (3 vacancies)
Party	Candidate	Votes	%	±%
Alliance	Stephanie Cook	3,530		
Independent	Ian McKinnon	2,875		
Independent	Alick Shaw	2,871		
Green	Iona Pannett	2,778		
Labour	David Zwartz	1,847		
Independent	John Macalister	782		
Legalise Cannabis	Michael Appleby	469		
Independent	Rosamund Averton	269		
Informal votes		96		
Turnout		12,296		

=== Northern ward ===
The Northern ward returns three councillors to the Wellington City Council. The final iteration of results for the ward were:

Northern Ward (3 vacancies)
Party	Candidate	Votes	%	±%
Independent	Robert Armstrong	2,669		
Independent	Helene Ritchie	2,954		
Independent	Hayley Wain	2,580		
Independent	Ian Hutchings	2,297		
Independent	James Candiliotis	1,361		
Independent	Ngaire Best	1,248		
Independent	Ashok Bhasin	663		
Independent	Kent Clark	550		
Independent	Ron England	198		
Informal votes		84		
Turnout		11,011		

=== Onslow-Western ward ===
The Onslow-Western ward returns three councillors to the Wellington City Council. The final iteration of results for the ward were:

Onslow-Western Ward (3 vacancies)
Party	Candidate	Votes	%	±%
Independent	Andy Foster	4,453		
Independent	John Morrison	3,008		
Independent	Jack Ruben	2,919		
Independent	Judy Siers	2,338		
Independent	Makao Bowkett	1,173		
Independent	Kelly Buchanan	642		
Informal votes		100		
Turnout		12,293		

=== Southern ward ===
The Southern ward returns two councillors to the Wellington City Council. The final iteration of results for the ward were:

Southern Ward (2 vacancies)
Party	Candidate	Votes	%	±%
Independent	Bryan Pepperell	2,467		
Green	Celia Wade-Brown	2,102		
Labour	Sue Piper	1,965		
Independent	Tafaleulua'iali'i Max To'o	1,423		
Independent	Benjamin Knight	566		
Independent	Linda Hobman	467		
Independent	Silvia Zonoobi	200		
Independent	Lagi Fatatoa Sipeli	107		
Informal votes		115		
Turnout		7,381		
