= James Cook High School =

School in New Zealand

James Cook High School (Te Haikura a Kiwa)

Location
- Dr Pickering Avenue, Manurewa, Manukau, New Zealand; 2102; 37.0358°S 174.8856°E

Information
- Type: State, co-educational, secondary (Years 9–13)
- Motto: Endeavour
- Established: 1968
- Ministry of Education Institution no.: 100
- Principal: Ms Tina Filipo
- Enrolment: 1,867 (July 2026)
- Houses: Rūaumoko; Tane Mahuta; Tangaroa; Tāwhirimātea
- Colors: Blue and Gold
- Website: jchs.school.nz

James Cook High School is a state co-ed secondary school in the South Auckland suburb of Manurewa, New Zealand. At the end of 2026, James Cook High School will be changing its name to Te Haikura A Kiwa.

== History ==
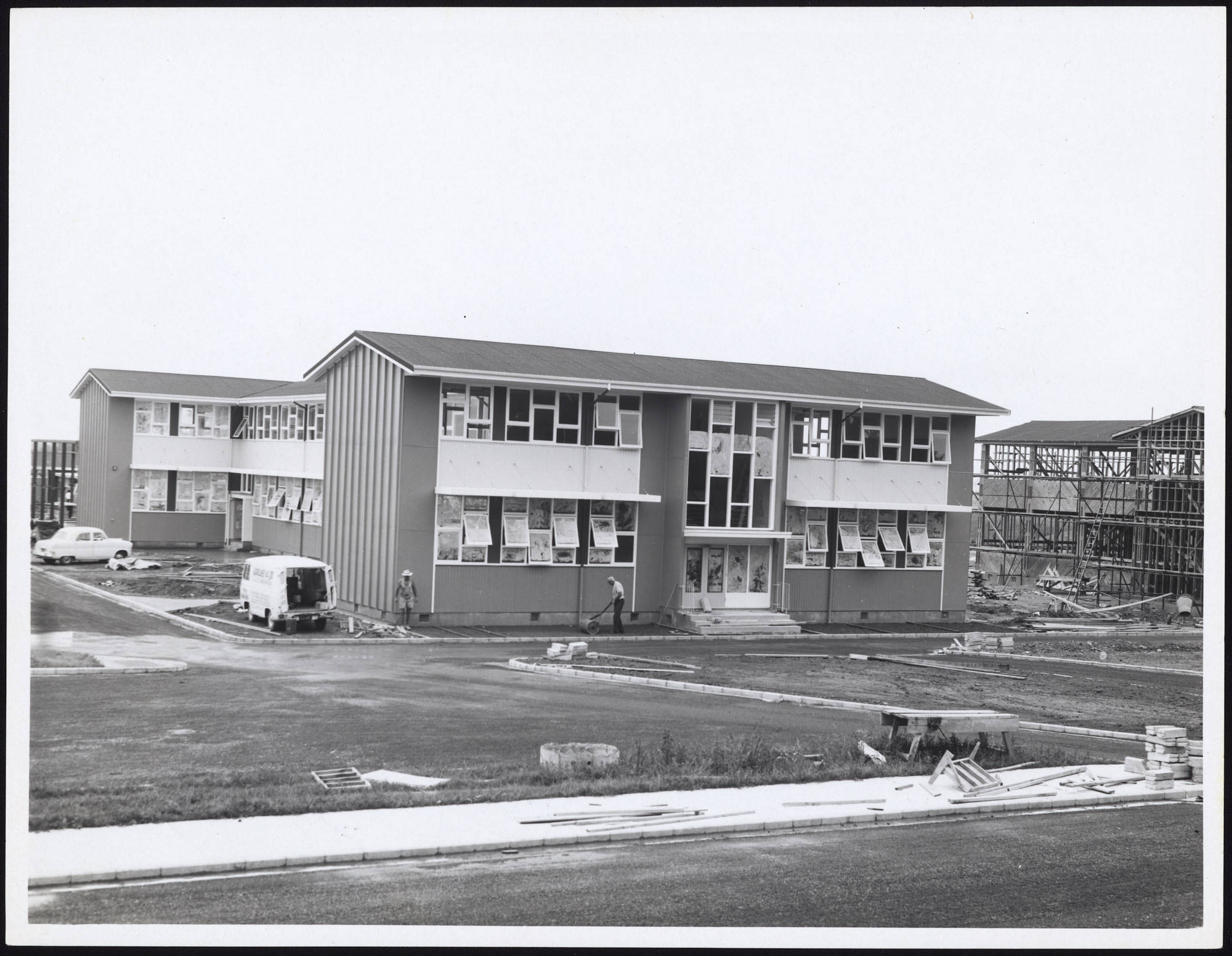
James Cook High School under construction in January 1968

James Cook High School opened in February 1968. Like most New Zealand state secondary schools of the era, the school was constructed to the Nelson Two-Storey standard plan, characterised by its two-storey H-shaped classroom blocks.

The name chosen for the school was met with widespread interest and approval, as 1968 was the bicentennial of the commencement of Captain Cook's voyage on the Endeavour into the south seas of the Pacific.

The James Cook High School crest was originally a broad shield design with a gold heraldic ship with full white sails and red pennants in the centre. The ship is sailing through two waves. The four gold stars are in the form of the Southern Cross. The school's insignia and uniform were modernised in 2013 and 2014. Both the crest and motto were inspired by the name 'James Cook.'

The James Cook High School School colours are Royal Blue and Gold. The motto 'Endeavour' was the name of James Cook's ship. 'Endeavour' implies: a goal to be striven for, strength of character, a determined, unrelenting effort which never slackens in spite of initial failures, the hope and faith to face new challenges, to surmount new obstacles, and above all, the giving of our best in all the activities of life, whether they be moral, social, cultural or academic.

Officially by 2027, James Cook will fully transition into Te Haikura a Kiwa. Te Haikura a Kiwa technically translates to Kiwa Highschool. A whole new direction has been marked for Kiwa where everything will be rebranded from 2027 onwards.

== Enrolment ==
According to a 2021 ERO report, the school's ethnic composition includes over 40% who identify as Māori and 45% who are from Pacific heritage. Samoan, Tongan and Cook Islands Māori students make up the largest Pacific nation groups.

As of July 2026, James Cook High School has a roll of 1,867 students, of which 692 (37.1%) identify as Māori.

As of 2026, the school has an Equity Index of 529, placing it amongst schools whose students have the most socioeconomic barriers to achievement (roughly equivalent to deciles 1 and 2 under the former socio-economic decile system).

== History of Principals ==
Name	From	To
Ms. Tina Filipo	January 2024	Present
Mr Grant McMillan	May 2016	October 2023
Mr Vaughan Couillault	June 2012	February 2016
Mr Bryan Smith	1994	2012

== Notable alumni ==
- Stephen Berry – politician and political commentator
- Peta Hiku – rugby league player
- Kenny Bromwich – rugby league player
- Mavina Davis, Maybelle Galuvao, and Lavina Williams – singers, members of Ma-V-Elle
- Scott Dixon – motor racing driver
- Joe Galuvao – rugby league footballer
- Gustavia Lui – businesswoman
- Lelia Masaga – rugby union player
- Joe Rokocoko – rugby union player
- J Williams – singer and entertainer
