= Graeme Hart =

New Zealand businessman

Graeme Richard Hart
- Born: 6 June 1955 (age 71); New Zealand
- Education: Mount Roskill Grammar School
- Alma mater: University of Otago
- Occupation: Businessman
- Years active: 1985–present
- Spouse: Robyn Jessie Hart
- Children: 2

Graeme Richard Hart (born 6 June 1955) is a New Zealand billionaire businessman and is among the country's richest persons. As of June 2024, his net worth was estimated at NZD$12.1 billion. He was the first New Zealander to be worth NZD$10 billion, topping the NBR Rich List for 20 years.

Much like other leveraged buyout (LBO) private equity investors, Hart has a preference for buying underperforming and undervalued companies with steady cash flows which can be turned around through better cash management, cost-cutting and restructuring with other businesses. Since his 2006 purchase of Carter Holt Harvey he has focused his acquisitions on the paper packaging sector. His largest acquisition to-date was for Alcoa's Packaging & Consumer group in 2008 for US$2.7 billion, later renamed Reynolds Packaging Group. He does not directly manage his businesses, and is focused mostly on the financing related to re-capitalisation of the companies.

Forbes stated that Hart was the 274th richest person in the world as of March 2022. In 2022, Hart was inducted into the New Zealand Business Hall of Fame.

== Early years ==
The son of a radiographer, Hart attended Mount Roskill Grammar School in Auckland. After leaving school at 15, he worked as a tow-truck driver and as a panel beater before starting his first business at the age of 18 with the help of a loan from his father.

In 1987, Hart completed an MBA from the University of Otago. His research thesis, as part of the MBA, outlined his strategy to grow Rank Group Limited, at the time a small "party hire" company servicing the greater Auckland area by integrating multiple acquired companies.

Hart gained a big break when he purchased the Government Printing Office for less than its capital value in 1990. The purchase was 1.4x earnings and Hart was provided generous payment terms. Then New Zealand Prime Minister David Lange initially refused to sign off on the transaction. The following year he bought Whitcoulls Group, which at that time included a retail chain of bookstores as well as office and stationery concerns. Within two years of the acquisition, Whitcoulls controlled 40% of the book and stationery market in New Zealand. He has since sold off these interests.

== Current interests ==
=== Rank Group ===
Rank Group Ltd is Hart's private investment company. It was the 100% owner of Reynolds Consumer Products until a public share offer in 2020, and is the owner of Burns Philp and Carter Holt Harvey. Rank had assets of approximately NZ$3 billion in cash after selling the assets of Burns Philp and floating Goodman Fielder in 2004.

In December 2006 he agreed to purchase International Paper's drinks packaging business Evergreen Packaging for NZ$725 million. In May 2007 he bought Swiss packaging company SIG for NZ$3.2 billion. The SIG division Combibloc is the second largest food and drink carton packaging company in the world after Swedish giant Tetra Laval. In August 2007 Hart completed his US$450 million purchase of US paper packaging company Blue Ridge Paper Products of North Carolina which he intends to merge with Evergreen Packaging of Arkansas. These acquisitions make Rank Group the world's second biggest company in the paper products business.

In March 2015 Reynolds Group Holdings completed the sale of SIG to Onex Corporation.

Hart's company vehicle is a Gulfstream G700, registered N71Z.

=== Burns Philp ===
Burns Philp and Company Limited was an Australian and New Zealand food manufacturing company dual listed on the ASX and NZX. Hart has been the chairman since September 2004 and a member of the board of directors since September 1997. In 2003 Burns Philp performed a A$2.4 billion hostile takeover of the much larger food group Goodman Fielder before relisting it through an IPO.

Following the sale of its yeast and spices business to UK firm Associated British Foods, Uncle Toby's to Nestlé for NZ$1.1 billion and Bluebird Foods to PepsiCo for NZ$245 million the company became largely a cashed up shell.

In December 2006, Hart completed a AU$1.6 billion takeover of the 42 per cent of Burns Philp he did not already own. After the successful takeover Burns Philp was delisted from the ASX and NZX. The deal gave him total control of A$2.9 billion of Burns Philp cash, net of debt, which he could then use to further build on his Carter Holt Harvey empire.

Hart sold Burn Philp's 20% stake in Goodman Fielder for NZ$675.8 million in October 2007.

=== Carter Holt Harvey ===
In 2006 Hart paid NZ$3.3 billion for Carter Holt Harvey (CHH), a New Zealand timber and paper business. Soon after completing the purchase he began restructuring the struggling company starting with the sale of CHH's forests to US-based Hancock Timber Group for up to NZ$2 billion. Hart has also sold CHH's head office property, various sawmills and packaging plants for over NZ$300 million.

In 2007 he announced the sale of CHH's building supplies business which some estimate could fetch NZ$2.3bn, but was unsuccessful in the selling of it.

Hart had also been seeking a purchaser for the packaging side of CHH since October 2010. In April 2014, CHH announced the sale of its Pulp, Paper & Packaging business to a Japanese consortium for NZ$1.037 billion, with the deal closing in the second half of 2014.

As at 2021, CHH controlled nearly half of New Zealand's structural timber trade.

=== Reynolds Packaging Group ===
In 2008 Hart paid US$2.7 billion for Alcoa (AA) Packaging & Consumer group. He spun off the company and renamed it Reynolds Packaging Group, which is now headquartered in Lake Forest, Illinois, USA. While this business is within the packaging industry, it is not paper packaging related, being mostly in the aluminium foil and plastic closure business. Since the purchase from Alcoa, Hart has cut more than 20% of the workforce within Reynolds, mostly through plant shutdowns, including the flagship Reynolds Wrap Foil Plant in Richmond, Virginia and restructuring efforts. This has resulted in significant savings and profit margin jump for the company, allowing him to issue more debt on behalf of the company in October 2009 and get a high return on his initial investment.

In November 2009 and May 2010, Hart, through additional debt financing has combined the packaging groups he owns into Reynolds Group Holdings Limited. RGHL is the combination of four operating segments: SIG (a beverage packaging manufacturer headquartered in Zurich), Closure Systems International (a plastic bottle cap manufacturer headquartered in Indianapolis), Evergreen Packaging (a beverage packaging manufacturer headquartered in Memphis), and Reynolds Consumer Products (an aluminium foil and other packaging materials manufacturer) located in Lake Forest, Illinois. While the operations are spread around the world, the RGHL corporate headquarters are located in the same office building as Reynolds Consumer Products in Lake Forest, Illinois.

On 17 June 2011, Reynolds Group Holdings announced its intention to acquire all of the outstanding stock of Graham Packaging Company, Inc, headquartered in York, Pennsylvania. The acquisition was completed on 8 September 2011 for $25.50 per share (in cash), for a total enterprise value, including net debt, of approximately US$4.5 billion. This acquisition increased Rank's growing profile in the US. Earlier in 2011, it agreed to buy the automotive consumer business of Honeywell International (the FRAM group) for US$950 million. In March 2015 Reynolds Group Holdings completed the sale of SIG to Onex Corporation.

=== Walter & Wild ===
Since 2018, Hart and his son Harry have been the majority shareholders in Walter & Wild, a holding company specialising in New Zealand food brands including Alfa One, Aunt Betty's, Greggs, Hansells, Hubbard Foods, Thriftee, Teza and Vitafresh.

== Personal life ==
Graeme Hart has multiple residences in New Zealand, including in Auckland, Queenstown, and Waiheke Island. Hart also owns an island in Fiji, as well as two properties in Aspen, Colorado in the US.

Hart says he lacks interest in making money for its own sake. He describes his personal wealth as a "by-product" of what he does.

While Hart prefers to keep a low profile in the general media, he was notable for the launch of his 58 metres (190 ft) luxury motor yacht Ulysses at Auckland's Viaduct Harbour in January 2006. The yacht was valued at nearly $100 million and took five years to complete due to it being gutted by a fire during refit at a New Orleans shipyard. In 2012 the Ulysses was put up for sale for $49 million.

Hart had a 89m yacht named Here Comes The Sun, launched in 2016 at 83m, and transformed in 2021, adding 6 more metres to increase the length to 89m. It was listed for sale in April 2023 for $195,000,000.

Hart has a new 107-metre (351 ft) long yacht under construction at Kleven Verft in Ulstein Municipality in Norway. The yacht will also include a helicopter deck, a hangar, and accommodation for up to 60 persons. Hart's latest 107-metre (351 ft) "expedition yacht," formerly named Ulysses, was completed and eventually launched on 3 September 2014, in Ulsteinvik, north of Oslo, at the Kleven Verft shipyard.

In 2017 it was reported that he purchased a new 116 metres (381 ft) explorer yacht, which was named "Ulysses", after his 107 metres (351 ft) yacht, formerly of the same name, had been sold.

In December 2018, the Hart Family made a $10 million donation to the University of Otago to go towards opening their $28.2 million dental teaching facility in South Auckland.

In February 2022, Hart donated eight tractors, 30 fishing boats and a container of food to the people of Tonga following the 2022 Hunga Tonga–Hunga Ha'apai eruption and tsunami.

=== Politics ===
Hart donated over $58,000 to the mayoral campaign of Wayne Brown in the 2022 local body elections. He has also made donations to the New Zealand First and ACT parties.

During the 2023 New Zealand general election, Radio New Zealand reported that Hart had donated a total of NZ$700,000 to centre-right to right-wing parties including National, ACT and New Zealand First. Of this amount, National had received NZ$400,000, ACT NZ$200,000 and New Zealand First NZ$100,000 from Hart and his company, Rank Group Limited.

Hart donated another total of NZ$700,000 through Rank Group Ltd in the lead-up to the 2026 general election, with $500,000 going to the National Party and $200,000 to the ACT Party.
