= Dick Hubbard =

New Zealand businessman and politician

Dick Hubbard ONZM
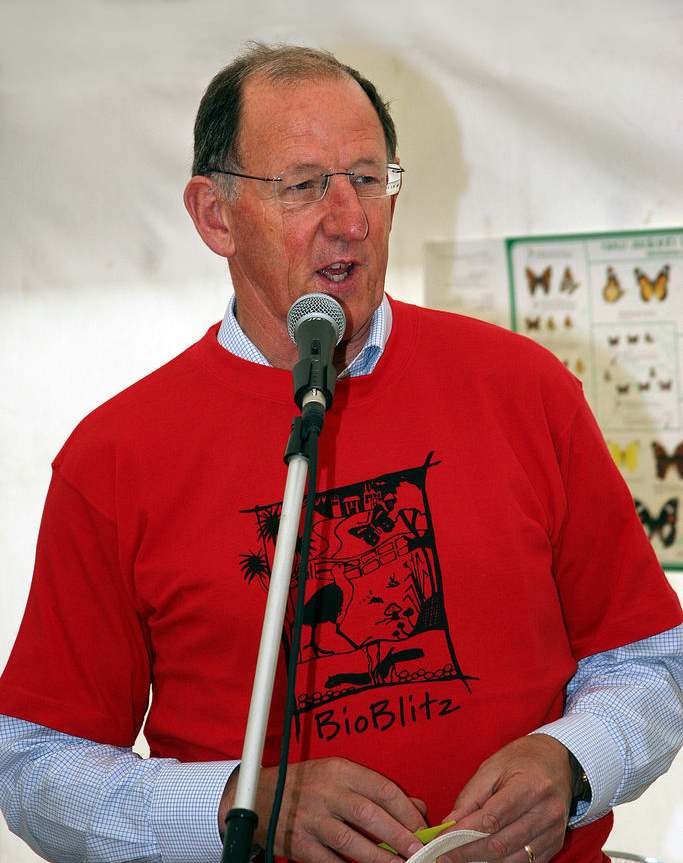

39th Mayor of Auckland City
- In office 2004–2007
- Preceded by: John Banks
- Succeeded by: John Banks

Personal details
- Born: Richard John Hubbard; 18 December 1946 (age 79) Paeroa, New Zealand
- Spouse: Diana Reader (m. 1970)
- Children: 2, including Laurel Hubbard

Richard John Hubbard ONZM (born 18 November 1946) is a New Zealand businessman and politician, founder and former principal of Hubbard Foods in Auckland, and mayor of Auckland City from 2004 to 2007. He was elected mayor of Auckland City on 9 October 2004, succeeding John Banks, who in turn succeeded Hubbard as mayor on 13 October 2007.

== Early life and family ==
Born in Paeroa on 18 December 1946, Hubbard is the son of Colin Hubbard and Margaret Hubbard (née Syme). He was educated at Paeroa College from 1960 to 1964, and then studied at Massey University from 1965 to 1969, graduating with a Bachelor of Technology (Food).

In 1970 Hubbard married Diana Reader, and the couple went on to have two children, including weightlifter Laurel Hubbard.

== Business interests ==
Hubbard is the founder of Hubbard Foods. His management of Hubbard Foods gained some prominence for its participation in and promotion of socially responsible business perspectives. Hubbard also spent a few years managing the Food Processing Factory in Niue, processing mainly lime, passionfruit and papaya. He was the principal until he sold the business in 2018 to Harry and Graeme Hart.

Hubbard founded New Zealand Businesses for Social Responsibility (BSR) (now the Sustainable Business Network) and became chairman of the New Zealand National Parks & Conservation Foundation. He has been a supporter of Outward Bound in New Zealand.

== Mayoral term ==
Hubbard was elected as part of a broad swing to the centre-left in the 2004 Auckland City local government elections, predicated on concerns about the style of the previous mayor, and proposals to construct a major new multi-laned road through the city's relatively affluent eastern suburbs. Although formally independent, Hubbard's support on Auckland's council was derived from the centre-left leaning City Vision, Labour, and Action Hobson tickets.

=== Re-election bid, 2007 ===
Hubbard was defeated by John Banks in the 2007 local body elections, by a margin of 10,000 votes. Hubbard won 35,314 of the votes compared to Banks' 45,387 votes in an election marked by low voter turn-out.

== Political positions ==
Hubbard endorsed the Labour Party prior to the 2017 general election, appearing in a series of promotional videos and donating $15,000 to the campaign. He stated that he regarded himself as a swing voter and had voted for both National and Labour previously, but was "very concerned about our slow progress on climate" under the incumbent government. Hubbard donated $240,000 to the Labour Party between 2023 and 2026.

== Honours and awards ==
In 1984 Hubbard was elected a Fellow of the New Zealand Institute of Food Science and Technology. Hubbard was conferred an honorary Doctor of Science degree by Massey University in 1999. In the 2001 New Year Honours, he was appointed an Officer of the New Zealand Order of Merit, for services to business and the community.

Political offices
Preceded by John Banks	Mayor of Auckland City; 2004–2007	Succeeded by John Banks
