= Len Brown =

1st mayor of Greater Auckland

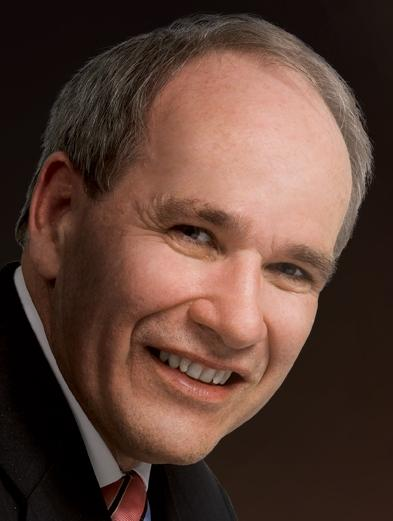

1st Mayor of Auckland
- In office October 2010 – 14 October 2016
- Deputy: Penny Hulse
- Preceded by: Office created Himself (as Mayor of Manukau City); John Banks (as Mayor of Auckland City); Bob Harvey (as Mayor of Waitakere City); Andrew Williams (as Mayor of North Shore City); Calum Penrose (as Mayor of Papakura District); Penny Webster (as Mayor of Rodney District); Mark Ball (as Mayor of Franklin District)
- Succeeded by: Phil Goff
- Majority: 65,945

Mayor of Manukau City
- In office October 2007 – 31 October 2010
- Deputy: William Sio
- Preceded by: Barry Curtis
- Succeeded by: Office abolished
- Majority: 14,777

Personal details
- Born: Leonard Charles Brown; 1 October 1956 (age 70) Taumarunui, New Zealand
- Party: Labour
- Spouse: Shirley Inglis
- Children: 3
- Education: University of Auckland
- Profession: Lawyer

Leonard Charles Brown (born 1 October 1956) is a former mayor of Auckland, New Zealand, and former head of the Auckland Council. He won the 2010 Auckland mayoral election held on 9 October 2010 and was sworn in as Mayor of Auckland on 1 November 2010, being the first to hold that title for the amalgamated Auckland "Super City", and was re-elected in 2013. Brown had previously been elected mayor of Manukau City in October 2007, the second time he ran for that office. Brown is married to Shirley Anne "Shan" Inglis, and has three daughters. As Mayor of Auckland, Brown was a vocal advocate for the City Rail Link and helped pass the city's first Unitary Plan.

== Early years ==
Brown was born in Taumarunui, a small town in the King Country of the central North Island of New Zealand. His family moved to Ōtara, South Auckland when he was seven years old. He attended Mayfield Primary School, Papatoetoe Intermediate School and De La Salle College.

He remembers his youth in prosperous small-town New Zealand fondly, remarking on them as "generous, generous days". His life growing up has been described as revolving around family, church, school and community. His parents, Tom and Ngaire, were described as strong believers in social equity and social justice as well as active in the community life. While not having grown up fully in Auckland, his family often travelled to see relatives there, his parents having originally moved to Taumarunui from South Auckland.

A lawyer by profession, Brown was a partner at law firm Wynyard Wood, and co-founded the Howick Free Legal Service. In 1990, Brown was awarded the New Zealand 1990 Commemoration Medal.

== Political career ==
He was first elected to the Manukau City council in 1992, and continued as councillor until 2004 when he did not run for re-election. He was also the chairperson of the Counties Manukau Health Council from 1998. Brown first ran for mayor of Manukau City in 2004, and narrowly lost to long serving mayor Sir Barry Curtis by fewer than 600 votes. Brown had considered requesting a re-count due to the closeness of the vote, but decided that he had not been close enough to warrant it. Despite his affiliation with the New Zealand Labour Party since age 17, Brown did not run for election in the 2005 general election, and instead returned to working for Wynyard Wood.

=== Mayor of Manukau City ===
Brown announced his candidacy for the Manukau City mayoralty in 2006, Barry Curtis announced that he would not be running for re-election, and Brown's main opposition were former Olympic runner Dick Quax and radio personality Willie Jackson. Brown resigned from Wynyard Wood in 2007 to focus on his candidacy full-time. In August 2007, both Quax and Brown were polling "neck and neck". Brown ran on several policies, including; capping rates at the cost of inflation, increasing public transport, and working with youth in the region.

Brown won the election in October 2007 with more than 32,000 votes; his next closest rival Dick Quax had less than 18,000, and the election was humorously termed a 'Lenslide' by some. He was sworn in on 26 October 2007 at the Manukau City Council hall.

On 31 May 2008 he suffered a heart attack, while at a music awards ceremony. The condition arose from a previously unrecognised congenital heart problem and Brown was admitted to Auckland Hospital. Brown had successful coronary artery bypass surgery two days later and made a full recovery, returning to mayoral duties after a few months. His wife acknowledged that the attack was not stress-related, but rather a family issue, with Len's mother having died from a heart attack at 47.

=== Mayor of Auckland campaign ===
In August 2009, Brown announced that he would run for the mayoralty of the combined Auckland "super-city" in the 2010 Auckland mayoral election. His campaign speech focused on delivering public transport, public ownership of the region's public assets, environmental protection, economic and social development. He won the position by a majority of 65,945 votes over main rival candidate, Auckland City mayor John Banks, on 9 October 2010, spending approximately $390,000.

==== Credit-card and expense issues ====
In June 2010, Brown came under media attention for matters relating to his spending on his council credit card and other council expense claims, which included items of a personal nature like toys, groceries and insect repellant. His subsequent explanations for these purchases were also scrutinised at a council meeting, where Brown repeatedly slapped his face and got emotional. An advisor later explained that Brown's emotional behaviour was attributable to his use of a Maori tradition, which Brown subsequently denied. Another council expense claim included an $810 dinner at a restaurant, which Brown has refused to discuss who was in attendance. He noted that the event was a fundraiser for a local singer for which the Council bought a table, an explanation later supported by the artist.

=== Mayor of Auckland ===
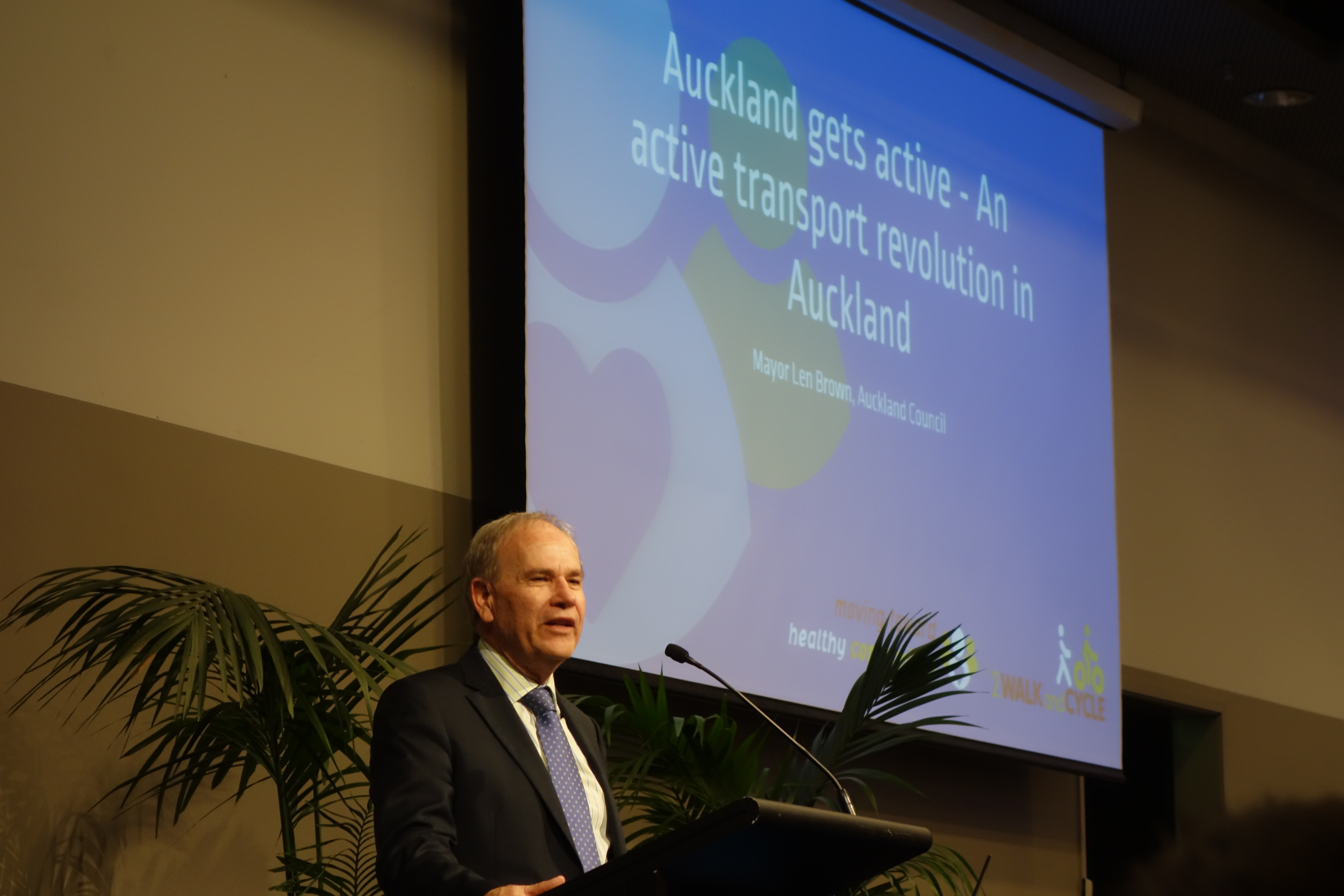
Brown speaking at the 2016 2WALKandCYCLE Conference

As Mayor of Auckland, Brown was an advocate for the proposed City Rail Link, to boost public transport usage. In June 2013, the National Government agreed to financially support construction of the rail project, and construction began in late-2015.

Brown was re-elected to the mayoralty in 2013, gaining 46.6% of the vote. In response to the low voter turnout (at 34% the lowest ever recorded in Auckland), Brown said the next election should include electronic voting and take place on one day, instead of being spread out over three weeks. In late 2015, he stated he would not contest the mayoralty at the 2016 election, and was succeeded as mayor by Phil Goff as a result of that election.

==== Extramarital affair ====
Days after his October 2013 re-election, stories broke regarding Brown having a two-year extramarital affair with Bevan Chuang, a younger woman who served on an Auckland Council advisory board, and having sex with Chuang in the mayoral office and town hall. Brown released a statement confirming the affair, though not the details on where they had sex. Later in the week, Chuang claimed to have been pressured to go public by a member of mayoral rival John Palino's election team, which she later regretted doing.

The Auckland Council launched an investigation into spending by the mayor, which backed up his insistence that he never spent council money on Chuang. The report did find that he had received undisclosed upgrades from hotels around the city. The Serious Fraud Office determined that the matter did not require further investigation or prosecution, and leave to bring a private prosecution for corruption was denied by the Solicitor-General for lack of proper evidence.

Libertarian politician Stephen Berry and organisation Affordable Auckland organised a "Stand Down Len Brown" protest on 22 February 2014 in response to this controversy. Berry said "If I, you, or anyone else engaged in sexual relations with one of their staff during work time on work premises, they would quite deservedly lose their job. That same standard should be held to the most senior staff in an organisation as well as the most junior. Mayor Brown isn’t going to be allowed to get away with a duck and cover until the controversy subsides; I am determined to see public opinion prevail and Len Brown resign." The protest attracted around 300 people.

Veteran protester Richard Cuthbert protested Brown at a Greenlane intersection from 11am to 2pm every Saturday for over 70 Saturdays, making it one of the longest-standing street protests in Auckland's history. Cuthbert became notorious for holding controversial signs, such as "Toot if Len Brown Sux". Cuthbert had bananas and bottles thrown at him, but said he still got "over 1000 toots a day."

In 2022 the story of Len Brown's affair has been made into a dramedy 'Princess of Chaos' at a cost of 2.6 million dollars. It screened on TVNZ 2 on 6 December, after that year's Auckland mayoral elections had finished.

Political offices
Preceded by Barry Curtis	Mayor of Manukau City; 2007–2010	Office abolished
New office	Mayor of Auckland; 2010–2016	Succeeded by Phil Goff
