= 2010 Auckland mayoral election =

New Zealand mayoral election

- 9 October 2010
- Turnout: 487,703 (50.17%)
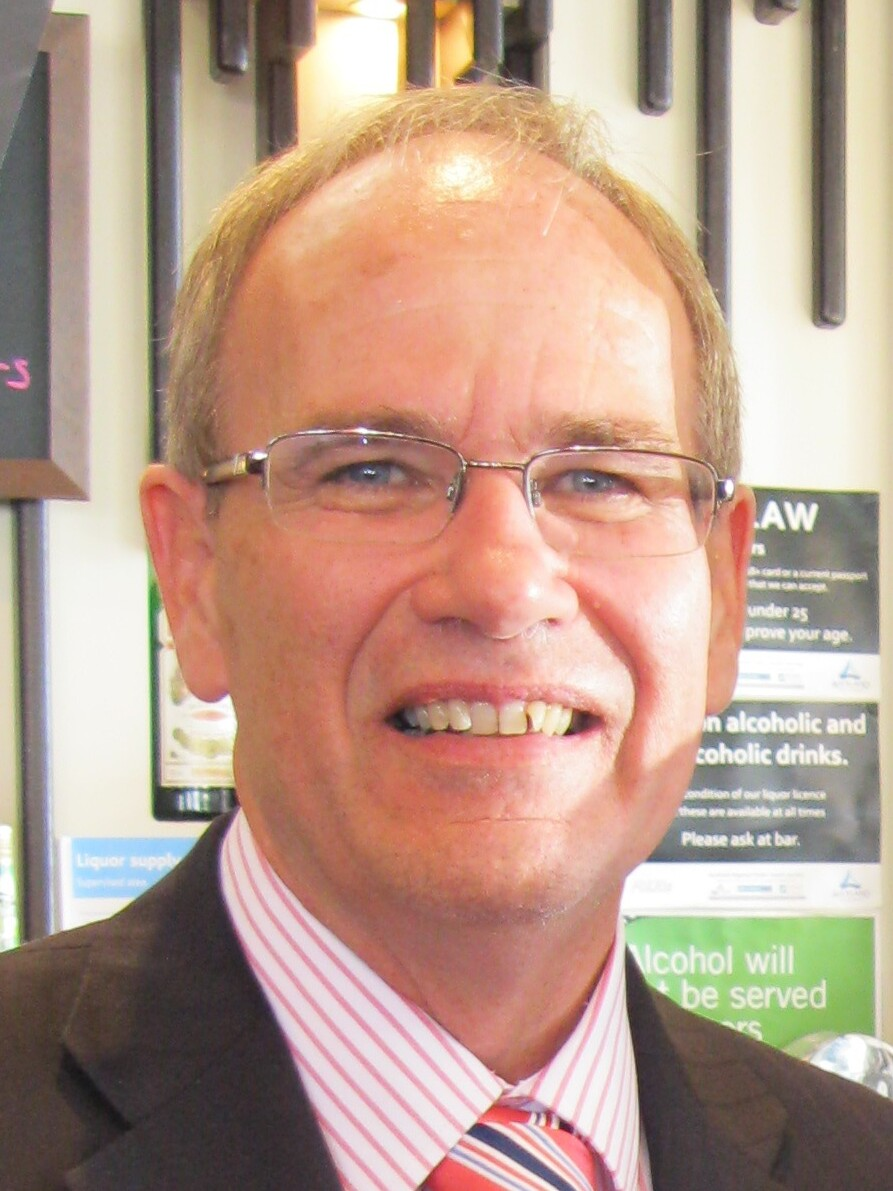

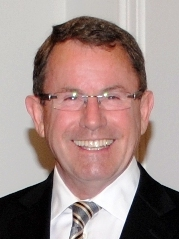

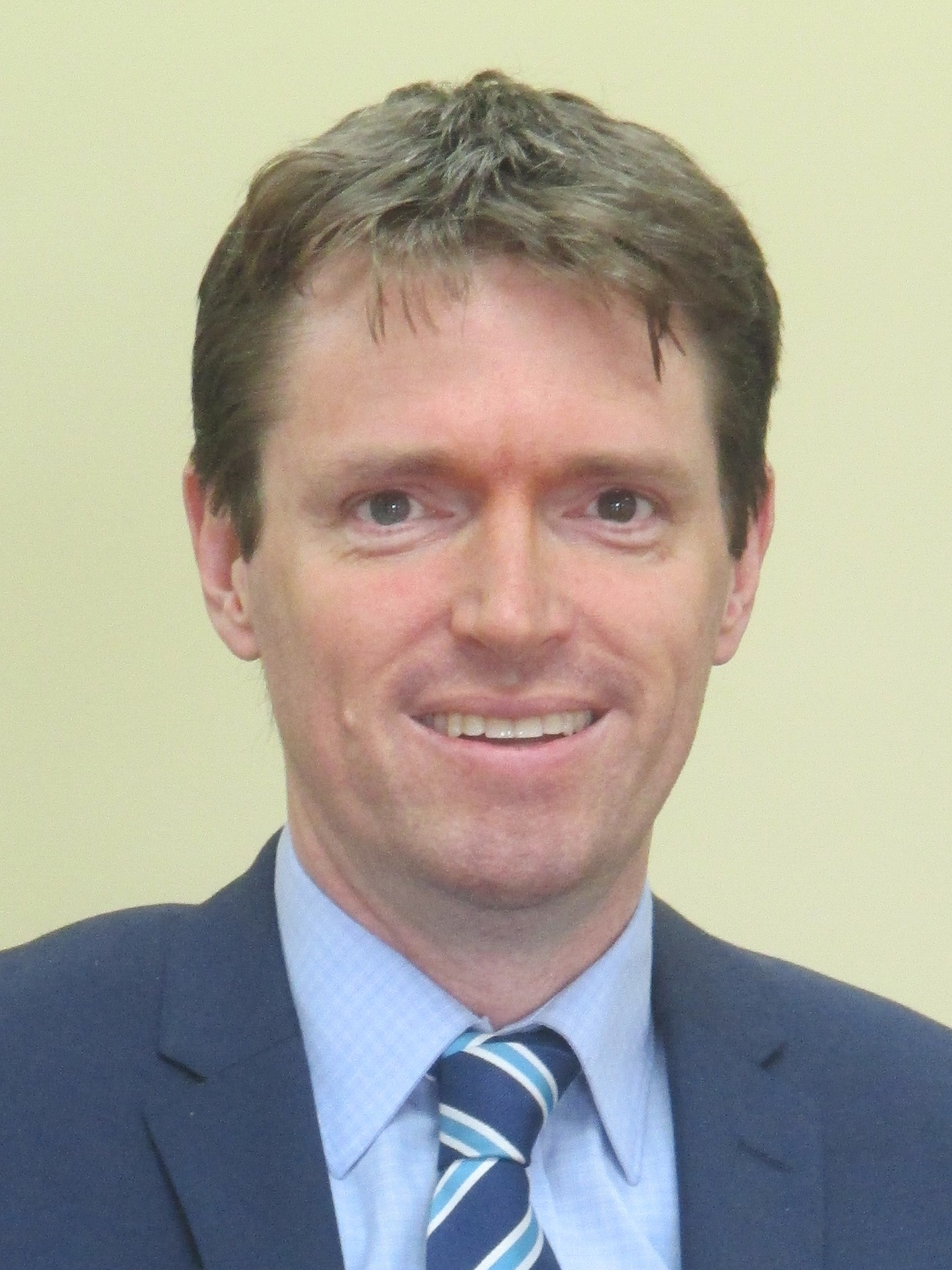
Candidate	Len Brown	John Banks	Colin Craig
Party	Independent	Independent	Independent
Popular vote	237,487	171,542	42,598
Percentage	49.24%	35.57%	8.83%
Mayor before election
Position created
Elected mayor
Len Brown
Independent

The 2010 Auckland mayoral election was part of the 2010 New Zealand local elections. It was the first election of a mayor for the enlarged Auckland Council, informally known as the "super-city". The election was won by sitting mayor of Manukau City Len Brown with 49.24% votes, over sitting mayor of Auckland City John Banks with 35.57% and first-time candidate Colin Craig with 8.83%. The sitting mayor of North Shore City Andrew Williams polled fourth and actor/director Simon Prast fifth.

The election occurred on Saturday 9 October 2010, as per the Local Electoral Act 2001. Like the majority of New Zealand mayoral elections, the election was held by postal voting using the first-past-the-post system. It was the largest election of the 2010 local elections, with some 961,536 eligible voters (32.5% of all registered voters nationally) able to vote in the election.

== Candidates ==
Several candidates announced their intentions to run for mayor of Auckland before official nominations opened.

- Manukau City mayor Len Brown announced his candidacy on 30 August 2009.
- Auckland City mayor John Banks announced his candidacy on 10 November 2009. He was later found guilty of filing a false electoral return after the election.
- Actor/director Simon Prast announced his candidacy on 25 June 2010.
- Direct democracy campaigner Colin Craig announced his candidacy on 28 June 2010.
- North Shore City mayor Andrew Williams announced his candidacy on 10 July 2010.

Nominations opened on 23 July 2010, and closed at 12 noon NZST (UTC+12) on 20 August 2010. At the close of nominations, 23 candidates had put their name forward.

== Opinion polls and campaigns ==
Source	Date (published)	Banks	Brown	Williams	Lee	Tindall	Margin of error
UMR - New Zealand Herald	April 2009	17%	6%		1%		
UMR - New Zealand Herald	23 July 2009	34%	35%				4.5%
UMR - New Zealand Herald	November -December, 2009	31%	42%				4.5%
Herald on Sunday/Buzz Channel	December, 2009	8.2%	23.8%		5.7%	11.6%	
Curia	February, 2010	42.5%	38.1%		1.3%	4.8%	
UMR - New Zealand Herald	30 April and 12 May	37%	48.4%				3.6%
Digipoll - New Zealand Herald	(14 August 2010)	28.7%	29.6%	3.9%			3.5%
Digipoll - New Zealand Herald	(16 September 2010)	27.8%	29.8%	1%			3.5%

Mike Lee and Stephen Tindall did not stand for mayor (though Lee stood as a councillor) but they were included in several opinion polls on a "what if" basis only.

Because Len Brown is generally associated with Labour, and John Banks with National, some analysts remarked that the election was likely to involve more party politics than usual in Auckland.

The two front-running candidates Brown and Banks were estimated to have spent around $1 million each on their campaigns, most from bigger donors. It was commented that the fact that Banks' advertising concentrated too much on the old Auckland City area, missing out other parts of the new council areas, and especially the south, may have played a role in his poorer than expected showing.

== Results ==
2010 Auckland mayoral election
Party	Candidate	Votes	%
Independent	Len Brown	237,487	49.24
Independent	John Banks	171,542	35.57
Independent	Colin Craig	42,598	8.83
Independent	Andrew Williams	4,023	0.83
Independent	Simon Prast	3,841	0.80
Independent	Mark Ross	3,246	0.67
Independent	Vanessa Neeson	3,051	0.63
Independent	Penny Bright	2,706	0.56
Independent	Hugh Chapman	2,015	0.42
Independent	Aileen Austin	1,632	0.34
Independent	Alan McCulloch	1,589	0.33
Independent	Harry Fong	1,487	0.31
Christians Against Abortion	Phil O'Connor	1,297	0.27
Independent	Vinnie Kahui	1,177	0.24
Independent	Nga Dave	893	0.19
Independent	Marlene Barr	718	0.15
Independent	Steve McDonald	677	0.14
Independent	Wayne Young	574	0.12
Roads First	David Willmott	542	0.11
Independent	Shannon Gillies	486	0.10
Communist League	Annalucia Vermunt	451	0.09
Independent	Raymond Presland	294	0.06
Total valid votes		482,326	
Rejected ballots		5,377	
Turnout		487,703	50.17
Independent win			

== See also ==
- 2010 Auckland Council election
