= John Banks (New Zealand politician) =

New Zealand politician (born 1946)

The Honourable John Banks CNZM QSO JP
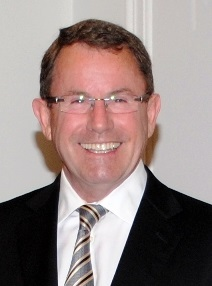

Leader of ACT New Zealand
- In office 16 February 2012 – 1 March 2014
- Preceded by: Don Brash
- Succeeded by: Jamie Whyte

38th Mayor of Auckland City
- In office 1 November 2007 – 31 October 2010
- Preceded by: Dick Hubbard
- Succeeded by: Office abolished Len Brown (as Mayor of Auckland)
- In office 1 November 2001 – 31 October 2004
- Preceded by: Christine Fletcher
- Succeeded by: Dick Hubbard

29th Minister of Police
- In office 2 November 1990 – 2 March 1994
- Prime Minister: Jim Bolger
- Preceded by: Richard Prebble
- Succeeded by: John Luxton

Member of the New Zealand Parliament for Whangarei
- In office 28 November 1981 – 27 November 1999
- Preceded by: John Elliott
- Succeeded by: Phil Heatley

Member of the New Zealand Parliament for Epsom
- In office 12 December 2011 – 8 June 2014
- Preceded by: Rodney Hide
- Succeeded by: David Seymour

Minister for Small Business
- In office 12 December 2011 – October 2013
- Prime Minister: John Key
- Preceded by: Maurice Williamson
- Succeeded by: Steven Joyce

Minister for Regulatory Reform
- In office 12 December 2011 – October 2013
- Prime Minister: John Key
- Preceded by: Rodney Hide
- Succeeded by: Bill English

Personal details
- Born: John Archibald Banks; 2 December 1946 (age 79) Wellington, New Zealand
- Party: ACT New Zealand
- Other political affiliations: National Party (until 2011)
- Spouse: Amanda Medcalf
- Children: 4

John Archibald Banks CNZM QSO JP (born 2 December 1946) is a New Zealand former politician. He was a member of Parliament for the National Party from 1981 to 1999, and for ACT New Zealand from 2011 to 2014. He was a Cabinet Minister from 1990 to 1996 and 2011 to 2013. He left Parliament after being convicted of filing a false electoral return – a verdict which was later overturned.

In between his tenures in Parliament, he served as Mayor of Auckland City for two terms, from 2001 to 2004 and from 2007 to 2010. When seven former smaller councils were combined into one to run the Auckland 'supercity' in 2010, Banks unsuccessfully ran for mayor again. The electoral return that he filed after that campaign, detailing donations received and campaign expenses, was the subject of Banks' conviction and eventual acquittal. After new evidence came to light, it was decided in May 2015 that there would be no retrial.

== Early life ==
Banks was born in Wellington in 1946. When he was a young child, his parents Archibald (Archie) and Kitty were imprisoned for procuring abortions. His father was a career criminal and his mother an alcoholic. From the age of two he was raised by an aunt and uncle, alongside "many foster children". When John was 14, Archie was released from prison. They moved to Auckland and John attended Avondale College.

He grew up in poverty. In a 2014 speech to Parliament he recalled

[G]oing to school every day in an ex-army uniform with no shoes; [...] stealing other kids' lunches; going home to bread and milk – at best – at night, cooked over an open fire with sugar on top; if I am very lucky, taking WeetBix covered in dripping to school each day; and living in a very dark hole. That is child poverty.

== Before politics ==
In his career before entering politics, Banks worked as a market researcher in the pharmaceutical industry, as a commercial property developer, and as a restaurant owner. He served for a time as Chairman of the New Zealand Licensed Restaurant and Cabaret Association.

Banks began his political career in local-body politics with election to the Birkenhead Borough Council in 1977. In 1980 he was elected a member of the Auckland Regional Authority for Birkenhead.

== Member of Parliament ==
New Zealand Parliament
Years	Term	Electorate	List	Party
1981–1984	40th	Whangarei		National
1984–1987	41st	Whangarei		National
1987–1990	42nd	Whangarei		National
1990–1993	43rd	Whangarei		National
1993–1996	44th	Whangarei		National
1996–1999	45th	Whangarei	16	National
2011–2014	50th	Epsom	4	ACT

In the 1978 general election, Banks stood as the National Party candidate for the Roskill electorate, but was unsuccessful. Banks ran against Labour Party incumbent Arthur Faulkner, seeing the electorate as an opportunity to enter parliament, due to Faulkner's small majority in 1975 and the electorate's newly redrawn boundaries. Banks campaigned full-time in the Roskill electorate, driving a Holden HQ during his campaign (instead of his Jaguar), and caused major controversies when making comments about Polynesian New Zealanders. In the 1981 election, he stood in a different seat, Whangarei, and won. He would retain this seat for the remainder of his parliamentary career with the National Party.

=== Cabinet minister ===
When National won the 1990 election, Banks entered Cabinet, becoming Minister of Police, Minister of Tourism, and Minister of Sport.

Banks said in 2019 after the Christchurch mosque shootings that he was "haunted" by not being able to persuade his cabinet colleagues to ban semi-automatic guns after the Aramoana massacre in 1990.

While Minister of Police, he was fined $750 for answering his cellular phone on a commercial flight in 1991.

=== Stance on homosexual law reform and gay marriage ===
On the final reading of New Zealand's 1986 Homosexual Law Reform, Banks said: "This day will be remembered as a sad and sickening day for New Zealand. A very black cloud tonight and those members who[...]vote for legalised sodomy at the age of 16 should be thoroughly ashamed of themselves." He subsequently voted against the Bill.

When debating New Zealand's 1993 Human Rights Act, which would prohibit discrimination against gays and lesbians based on sexuality, Banks said that "The problem with this homosexual business we've now made legal in his [sic] country...and parliament is soon going to legislate... to allow sexual deviants or people with sexual alternatives to work... with immunity."

In 2013, Banks voted in favour of the Marriage (Definition of Marriage) Amendment Bill, which legalised gay marriage. At the Third Reading debate on the Bill, Banks said that "After three decades and 10 Parliaments, I have had time to reflect—to reflect on what I said and to reflect on what I did. If I knew then what I have since learnt, I would have acted differently."

=== Radio Pacific talkback host ===
Banks gained a position as the host of a talkback radio programme on Radio Pacific in August 1992, taking over the Sunday afternoon timeslot from former Prime Minister Sir Robert Muldoon, for whom he had occasionally substituted during 1991 and 1992. In 1995, his fellow National Party Member of Parliament John Carter rang his programme impersonating a workshy Māori called Hone, which caused widespread offence. He left the station in 2007 when it reformatted to a sports talkback format.

=== Leaving Cabinet and Parliament ===
In 1996, he resigned from Cabinet, becoming a backbencher, after he refused to be in the same cabinet as New Zealand First leader and coalition partner Winston Peters.

Banks retired from Parliament at the 1999 election, returning in 2011.

== Mayor of Auckland City ==
=== First term 2001–2004 ===
In 2001, he contested and won the Auckland City mayoralty, defeating the incumbent Christine Fletcher (herself also a former National MP). Banks remained controversial in his new role, although often regarding financial and management issues rather than social policy. He governed with the support of the traditional incumbent ticket at Auckland City, Citizens and Ratepayers Now. Banks brought in a streamlined decision making process at council, kept spending increases within inflation, sold half of the Auckland International Airport shares to pay off Auckland City's increasing debt, and proposed massive transport projects such as the Eastern Transport Corridor. Banks' personal style, coupled with his mayoral agenda, polarised many Aucklanders. In 2001 he was caught speeding on a jet ski close to the beach, not long after criticising boy racers.

He also said Asian immigrants had filthy habits such as spitting on footpaths.

==== 2004 mayoralty campaign ====
A serious and ultimately successful challenge to Banks' mayoralty came from cereal-maker Dick Hubbard in late August 2004. Six weeks before the election, Hubbard was the more popular candidate in opinion polls.

The mayoral campaign gained notoriety as one of the "nastiest" and hardest-fought in memory. In September 2004, Banks's campaign manager, Brian Nicolle, resigned amidst allegations of "gutter politics" after he ordered distribution of copies of a National Business Review article highly critical of Hubbard to hundreds of letterboxes in Auckland. Nicolle at first denied ordering the article distribution, but eventually admitted it. That he'd acted without the authorisation of Banks as the candidate made the story even more controversial during the campaign.

On 9 October 2004, Hubbard was elected as Mayor of Auckland. In early interviews after his election loss, Banks stated that he would look after his varied business interests, both in New Zealand and Australia.

=== Post-2004 election ===
For a time, rumours suggested that he might return to national politics, standing as a candidate either for the National Party or ACT New Zealand. Several meetings took place between Banks and senior ACT members. In the end, however, Banks declined to become an ACT candidate.

In February 2005, Banks returned to talkback radio reprising his "Breakfast with Banksie" early morning radio show on Radio Pacific.

While on the talkback show, a caller said that "six inches of barbed wire shoved up gay mens arses" which John Banks retorted, would be a waste of "good barbed wire." In 2006, Banks said on his talk back radio show that he had "...never seen so many dead beat losers in one photograph in all my life, that is outside a Labour Party conference, as these Māori Warriors for Safe Sex." This was in relation to a safe sex advertisement that was targeted at Māori men who have same-sex relations.

=== Re-election in 2007 ===
In October 2006, Banks announced he was giving serious consideration to standing for the Auckland mayoralty again. He indicated that if he did become mayor again, he would practise a more inclusive style of leadership with a firmer focus on financial matters. He also indicated qualified support for the proposed 2007 "Hero Parade", which was an annual gay parade held in the 1990s prior to his becoming mayor. Banks ditched the controversial Eastern Corridor proposal that caused a split in his voting base.

In July 2007 Banks announced his intention to stand for mayor in the October 2007 local body election, running on a platform of "affordable progress" and transparency in council meetings. Polls soon showed him in a clear lead. In 2010, Banks campaigned for and negotiated with the government to help owners of 'leaky homes' meet the costs of repairs.

On 13 October 2007, Banks was re-elected as Mayor of Auckland, becoming only the second mayor in Auckland City's history to have come back to the mayoralty after defeat, after Dove-Myer Robinson in 1968.

=== Second term 2007–2010 ===
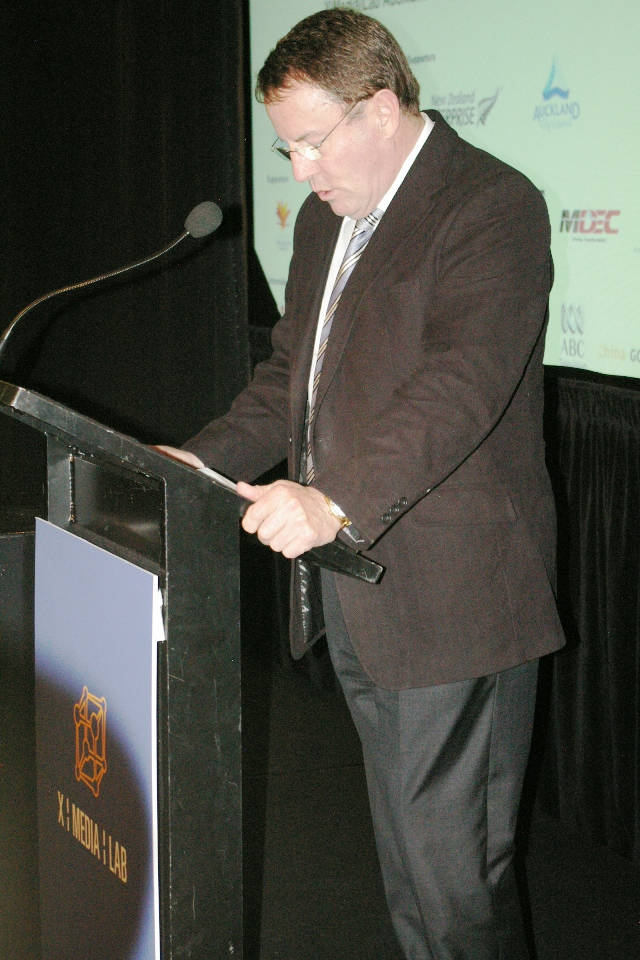
Banks speaking in 2009 at an X Media Lab event "Commercialising Ideas"

Upon his successful re-election, Banks indicated a number of initial changes and spending cuts in order to meet his goal of keeping future rates increases at affordable levels. Banks and the Citizens and Ratepayers council majority re-introduced a streamlined council structure, bringing in five super-committees instead of the previous 14 committees.

Banks has also campaigned on job creation and economic development initiatives, such as a film friendly policy for Auckland, to attract television, movie and commercial filming. The benefits of the film industry was reported as almost $900 million in GDP activity for Auckland region.

His personality, especially during his first mayoral term, has been called that of a bully, "raised by Sir Robert Muldoon in the ways of the bear pit". However, it has been commented that his leadership style became much less brusque and confrontative in his second term, something he himself ascribes to the "long, cold shower" he received in being defeated by political newcomer Dick Hubbard in the 2004 elections.

=== Auckland Council ===
Banks supported the creation of a unitary authority or a "supercity". After the Royal Commission on Auckland Governance recommended and the Government confirmed it would introduce a single council for the Auckland region, Banks stood in the 2010 Auckland mayoral election for the new Auckland Council. Banks has been critical of some of the aspects of the new supercity, favouring increased powers to the local boards that would represent people at the grassroots level.

Banks was unsuccessful, with Len Brown elected the first "supercity" mayor. Brown's margin over Banks was more than 65,000 votes. Banks declared as "anonymous" donations to his campaign that had been made by Kim Dotcom. He is accused of knowing that Dotcom had made them, leading to ongoing court action – see false electoral return accusation.

== Return to Parliament ==
On 18 May 2011, Mr Banks moved back to national politics by joining the ACT New Zealand Party. He stood in the Epsom electorate in that year's general election, becoming the sole MP for the party, and subsequently its leader. In parliament, he supported the National Government and was appointed as a Minister. Before the end of the parliamentary term, he was found guilty of filing a false electoral return in 2010. In 2013 John Banks voted in favour of the Marriage (Definition of Marriage) Amendment Act 2013, which allowed same sex couples to marry within New Zealand. He resigned as an MP on 13 June 2014.

=== Teapot tapes ===
Two weeks before the 2011 election, Banks and Prime Minister John Key had a very public cup of tea together in a cafe in Newmarket. This was seen as an endorsement of Banks by Key as the pseudo-National candidate for Epsom. Numerous members of the media covered the meeting but were eventually asked to leave so Banks and Key could talk in private. Journalist Bradley Ambrose left a recording device on the table, and subsequently gave the recording of the politicians' conversation to the Herald on Sunday newspaper. The recording allegedly contained comments about the leadership of ACT and disparaging remarks about elderly New Zealand First supporters. There was intense media interest in what was on the recording but the Herald refused to publish the recording – which became known as the Teapot Tape.

=== Election results ===
The ACT Party attracted only 1.07% of the party vote in the election. However, Banks won the Epsom electorate and become the party's sole MP. Party leader Don Brash resigned shortly thereafter and in February 2012, Banks was unanimously voted ACT party leader by the ACT board.

=== Minister in Fifth National Government ===
Banks served as Minister of Regulatory Reform, Minister for Small Business, Associate Minister of Commerce and Associate Minister of Education in the Fifth National Government until resigning the ministerial portfolios on 16 October 2013.

=== Resignations ===
When Banks was committed to trial in October 2013 over his false 2010 electoral return (for the Auckland mayoralty), he resigned his Ministerial positions. He remained as an MP and leader of the Act Party. In December 2013, he announced his intention to step down as Act leader (his replacement, Jamie Whyte, was elected by the party in February 2014). After being found guilty in June 2014, he resigned from Parliament.

== False electoral return accusation ==
Banks was accused of filing a false electoral return after the 2010 Auckland mayoralty campaign. A High Court trial in 2014 found him guilty, but new evidence saw the Court of Appeal overturn his conviction later that year. A retrial was initially ordered by the Solicitor-General, but after new evidence came to light the Court of Appeal ruled against a retrial.

=== High Court verdict (2014, since overturned) ===
The High Court found that Banks knew that two donations of $25,000, both declared as anonymous, were from Kim Dotcom. Dotcom had offered a single $50,000 donation, but Banks requested two cheques of $25,000 – this being the maximum amount allowed as an anonymous donation at the time under the Local Electoral Act 2001. Banks resigned from Parliament on 13 June, ahead of sentencing on 1 August 2014.

=== Sequence of events ===
This sequence of events is drawn from the judgement in Banks' 2014 trial.

==== Dotcom meetings and donation ====
Kim Dotcom and John Banks first met in April 2010, when Dotcom flew Banks to his mansion in a helicopter. They "discussed ... Mr Dotcom’s goals. He hoped to undertake venture capital investment in this country. There was also a short discussion about Mr Dotcom’s residence application and Mr Banks offered to assist in this regard". Banks, with his wife Amanda, visited the mansion again on 5 June. Over lunch, they discussed fundraising for his campaign. Dotcom offered $50,000 towards the campaign.

Kim, his wife Mona Dotcom, and their head of security Wayne Tempero all gave evidence that Banks asked for the donation to be split and remain anonymous. All three told the court that Banks explained this would make it easier for him to "help" Dotcom in the future. Justice Wylie found each of them to be "reliable and credible" witnesses.

Amanda Banks initially denied any discussion of the campaign or donations at the same lunch, but this changed under cross-examination. John Banks' evidence was different again, suggesting that they discussed donations of amounts up to $200,000, or even funding for the entire campaign, but not in great detail. Banks claimed to have suggested a single $25,000 donation, which could remain anonymous.

Later, Banks thanked Dotcom for his support over the phone. He never discussed Dotcom's donation with his campaign team.

==== Mayoral results and filing of election return ====
Results were declared on 14 October, confirming Banks' loss to Len Brown. After the campaign Lance Hutchison, JP, a volunteer member of Banks' campaign team, completed the electoral return. Hutchison decided which donations to record as anonymous, including all five of the $25,000 donations the campaign received. Unlike Banks, Hutchison had no way of knowing about Dotcom's donations. Banks signed the return on 9 December without reading the listed donations.

==== 2011 Parliamentary election ====
Having failed in his bid to become Mayor of Auckland, Banks returned to national politics, re-entering Parliament as the Member for Epsom in the November 2011 general election. He was ACT's only MP. Dotcom had refused to support the ACT Party's campaign.

==== Dotcom arrest ====
In January 2012, police raided Kim Dotcom's mansion, seized a range of assets, and arrested him on suspicion of copyright violation. He was held in Mt Eden Prison, in John Banks' Epsom electorate. The bedding aggravated his bad back and he wanted his own mattress from his mansion. He had his solicitor, Gregory Towers, contact Mr Banks for help.

Towers and Banks spoke on the phone for half an hour. Notes that Towers made at the time showed that Banks was unwilling to publicly support Dotcom in case "it b/comes known about election support etc". This note became an important piece of evidence, being accepted by Justice Wylie to refer to the $50,000 given by Dotcom, and to show that Banks knew it was not public knowledge.

==== 2012 investigation ====
In April 2012, allegations surfaced about donations to Banks' 2010 mayoral campaign. Labour MP Trevor Mallard laid a complaint about a $15,000 donation from SkyCity, listed as anonymous by Banks. Days later, Dotcom himself told The New Zealand Herald and TV3's Campbell Live programme about his own donations, saying that the $50,000 was split at Banks' request, that the cheques were written out in the presence of Banks, and that Banks called him a few days later to thank him. Two complaints, including another from Mallard, were made to the police about the Dotcom donations. (Like Mallard, the second complainant had also raised the SkyCity donations.)

The Police subsequently investigated, interviewing a number of people including Banks and Dotcom. In July 2012, Assistant Commissioner Malcolm Burgess announced that there was insufficient evidence to prosecute Banks and that the complaint was laid outside the statutory six month time limit.

==== Private prosecution ====
After the Police declined to charge Banks in relation to the donations, retired accountant Graham McCready brought a private prosecution against him instead. This went to court in December 2012. In April 2013 the judge found in favour of McCready, ruling that there was "sufficient evidence" for the case to go to trial. Banks subsequently resigned as a Minister of the Crown, but not as an MP. About a week after the ruling, the Solicitor General took over the prosecution from McCready. Banks then sought and lost a judicial review of the judge's decision.

The trial began on 19 May 2014, with the guilty verdict delivered on 5 June.

==== Conviction, sentence, appeal and exoneration ====
Justice Edwin Wylie convicted Banks on 1 August 2014. He was sentenced to two months' community detention and 100 hours of community work. The community detention essentially works as a curfew from 7pm to 7am on Thursday, Friday, Saturday and Sunday nights during which he must remain in his residence.

Within a week, Banks filed an appeal, claiming that new "watertight" evidence would exonerate him. His sentence was placed on hold and the Court of Appeal heard his appeal on 29 October. Signed affidavits from two new witnesses, American businessmen David Schaeffer and Jeffery Karnes, stated that they were at the lunch on 5 June 2010, and that there was no discussion about splitting the $50,000 donation into two parts. Kim and Mona Dotcom had both denied that the men were at the lunch in question. The Court of Appeal reserved its decision until late November, when it overturned Banks' conviction and ordered a retrial so the American businessmen's affidavits could be considered. In May 2015, the Court of Appeal reversed its decision to order a retrial when a new document was disclosed. The document included the affidavits from the two witnesses, confirming that Kim Dotcom and his then-wife Mona had fabricated their version of the events when giving evidence.

=== Local Electoral Amendment Bill ===
An amendment to local electoral laws nicknamed the 'John Banks bill' passed its first reading in November 2012. It tightens restrictions on campaign donations, and was directly inspired by the 'anonymous' donations to Banks' 2010 mayoralty campaign. The Local Electoral Amendment Bill passed its third reading and became law in June 2013. Local Government Minister Chris Tremain said "The Bill limits anonymous donations that a candidate can keep to $1500, clarifies and tightens the definition of 'anonymous donation', increases disclosure obligations and requires electoral officers to publish candidate returns of their donations and expenses." The bill also increased penalties for non-compliance.

== Honours and awards ==
In 1990, Banks was awarded the New Zealand 1990 Commemoration Medal. He was appointed a Companion of the Queen's Service Order for public services in the 2000 New Year Honours, and a Companion of the New Zealand Order of Merit, for services to local-body affairs, in the 2011 Queen's Birthday Honours.

== Personal life ==
In 2014, Banks had an apartment in central Auckland, having previously lived in Remuera.

He married Amanda Medcalf in December 1987. They adopted three children from a Saint Petersburg orphanage in 1995, a girl and two boys. They separated over the stress created by Mr Banks' 2014 trial and Amanda moved to central Otago.

He holds a private pilot's licence, for fixed-wing aircraft and helicopters. He is also an avid motorcar and motorcycle enthusiast, owning a Harley Davidson motorbike.

Banks has stated that he believes the first chapters of the Book of Genesis, describing the creation of the world in six days, are literally true.

In late January 2021, Banks was sacked as a talkback host from the MagicTalk radio network, after agreeing with a racist caller that Māori were a "stone age" people

=== Paternity case ===
In 2016 Antony Shaw, an English language teacher living in Japan, launched legal proceedings against Banks as a paternity claim.

In the High Court proceedings, Shaw said his mother Pamela Mayes told him he was conceived during a relationship she had with Banks in 1969, and that when she told Banks she was pregnant that he had ended the relationship. In a sworn affidavit, Mayes alleged that Banks procured drugs that would make her miscarry, and pressured her into taking the necessary dosage, which she refused to do.

In 1999 Mayes told Shaw his real father was John Banks. First Mayes and later Shaw contacted Banks to request confirmation of paternity but this was denied. Banks also denied the request for a DNA test.

After hearing evidence in the High Court case, Judge Courtney declared that Banks is the birth father of Antony Brett Shaw.

== Biographies ==
- Paul Goldsmith: John Banks: A Biography: Auckland: Penguin: 2001: (Updated. Originally published 1997): ISBN 0-14-301819-1
- Noel Harrison: Banks: Behind the Mask: Wellington: Estate of Lyndsay Rae Gammon: 2002: ISBN 0-476-00990-1

New Zealand Parliament
Preceded by John Elliott	Member of Parliament for Whangarei; 1981–1999	Succeeded by Phil Heatley
Preceded by Rodney Hide	Member of Parliament for Epsom; 2011–2014	Succeeded by David Seymour
Political offices
Preceded by Richard Prebble	Minister of Police; 1990–1994	Succeeded by John Luxton
Preceded by Christine Fletcher	Mayor of Auckland City; 2001–2004; 2007–2010	Succeeded by Dick Hubbard
Preceded by Dick Hubbard	Mayor of Auckland City; 2001–2004; 2007–2010	Succeeded by Len Brown new title, Mayor of Auckland
Party political offices
Preceded by Don Brash	Leader of the ACT Party; 2012–2014	Succeeded by Jamie Whyte
