= 2019 Auckland mayoral election =

New Zealand mayoral election

- 12 October 2019
- Registered: 1,065,383
- Turnout: 367,796 (34.52%)
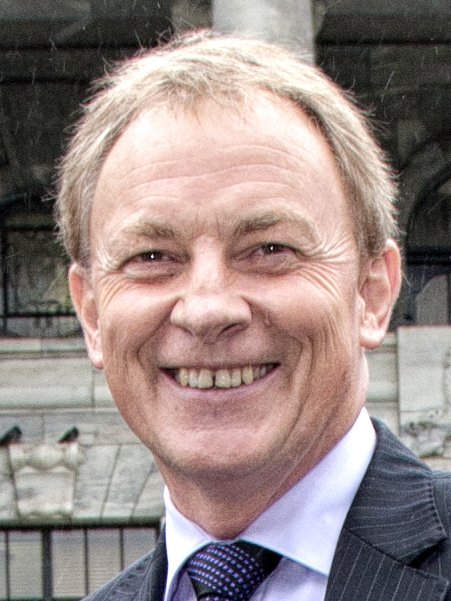

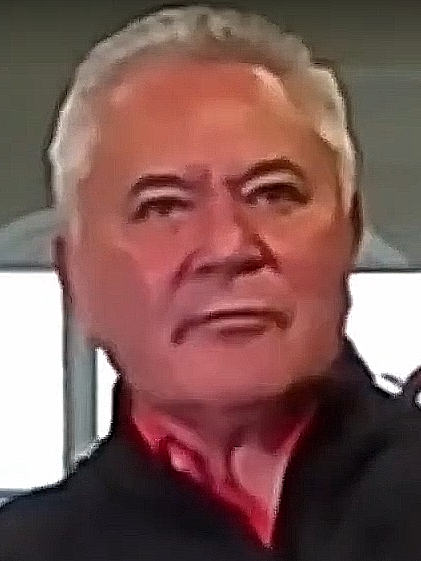

| Candidate | Phil Goff | John Tamihere | Craig Lord |
| Party | Independent | Independent | Independent |
| Popular vote | 180,146 | 80,903 | 29,577 |
| Percentage | 48.97% | 21.99% | 8.04% |
- Margin of victory in local board subdivisions
Mayor before election
Phil Goff
Independent
Elected mayor
Phil Goff
Independent

The 2019 Auckland mayoral election was held on 12 October 2019 to determine who would serve as Mayor of Auckland for the next three years. Nominations opened on 19 July 2019 and closed on 16 August 2019. Incumbent Mayor Phil Goff won the election with 48% of the vote to secure a second term.

== Background ==
Phil Goff was the incumbent mayor of Auckland. Goff became mayor at the 2016 election in which the previous mayor, Len Brown, did not stand. Goff announced in March 2019 that he would stand again.

The election was conducted by postal vote, and used the first past the post vote system.

== Key dates ==
Key dates for the election were:

- 1 July: Electoral Commission enrolment campaign began.
- 19 July: Nominations opened for candidates. Rolls opened for inspection.
- 16 August: Nominations closed at 12 noon. Rolls closed.
- 21 August: Election date and candidates' names announced.
- 20 to 25 September: Voting documents delivered to households. Electors could post the documents back to electoral officers as soon as they had voted.
- 12 October: Polling day. Voting documents had to be at council before voting closed at 12 noon. Preliminary results were to be available as soon as all ordinary votes were counted.
- 17 to 23 October: Official results, including all valid ordinary and special votes, declared.

== Candidates ==
The 21 candidates for the mayoralty were:

| Name | Affiliation | Notes |
|---|---|---|
| Tricia Cheel | STOP Trashing our Planet | Cheel had previously run for mayor, and had stood for Parliament for the Ban 1080 Party and the Democrats for Social Credit. She has opposed fluoride, vaccinations, glyphosate, and 1080 drops. |
| Michael Coote | Independent | |
| David John Feist | LiftNZ | |
| Genevieve Forde | none | Forde's main issues were addressing climate change and regenerating nature. |
| Phil Goff | Independent | The incumbent mayor, in the role since 2016. Goff was a Labour Party Member of Parliament 1981–1990 and 1993–2016, and was leader of the party for three years. He resigned as an MP after being elected as mayor and ran as an independent in this election. |
| Alezix Heneti | none | |
| Jannaha Henry | none | A 21-year old candidate. |
| John Hong | Independent | Also known as Hong Cheng Chen, he immigrated from China in 2003 and ran for mayor for the first time. A right-wing candidate, he had previously worked for Panuku Development Auckland, and was the chair of the New Zealand promotion committee for China's Belt and Road Initiative and a government relations adviser for the Chao San General Association of New Zealand. |
| Ted Johnston | none | A 59-year-old criminal barrister from South Auckland and former parliamentary candidate for The Opportunities Party. Policies included helping the poor and disadvantaged, stopping "secret meetings", protecting parks and the environment and building fast rail. |
| Susanna Kruger | Justice for Families | |
| Craig Lord | Independent | A media operator, this was Lord's first time standing in an election. Lord stated that he had no policies and that he considered the mayor to be a 'token' job, given the role of the 20 other councillors. |
| Brendan Bruce Maddern | Independent | |
| Thanh Binh Nguyen | Independent | |
| Phil O'Connor | Christians Against Abortion | |
| Tom Sainsbury | Independent | A comedian running under an alter-ego of Fiona (though the name on the ballot was Tom Sainsbury). Fiona claimed in a video that running for mayor was a mistake she made when drunk. |
| Glen Snelgar | Old Skool | A right-wing candidate who sought to remove fuel taxes and lower rates. |
| Tadhg Tim Stopford | The Hemp Foundation | Stopford is the founder of The Hemp Foundation, which seeks to promote cannabinoids for medicine and industrial uses. |
| John Tamihere | JT for Mayor | Tamihere was a Labour Party Member of Parliament from 1999 to 2005, and held Cabinet positions. He was not affiliated with Labour in this election. |
| Peter Vaughan | none | A numerologist, Vaughan stated that pollution is the biggest issue facing Auckland, particularly landfills. |
| Annalucia Vermunt | Communist League | |
| Wayne Young | Virtual Homeless Community | |

=== Prospective candidates who did not stand ===
The following people indicated they might, or would, run for mayor in this election, but ultimately did not.

- Mike Lee, councillor
- John Lehmann, president of the Government Accountability League – announced intention to run but did not appear in the list of candidates when nominations closed
- Joshua Love, hospitality entrepreneur – announced intention to run but did not appear in the list of candidates when nominations closed
- Simon O'Connor, MP for Tamaki
- John Palino, restaurateur and 2013 and 2016 candidate – announced intention to run on 25 November 2018 but withdrew on 12 August 2019, intending to run for Auckland Council instead.

== Policies and campaigning ==
The campaign included a number of debates. One debate between Goff, Tamihere, Lord, and Henry discussed issues such as infrastructure, public transport, climate change, parking, and inequality, among other topics. The last debate was on 1 October. Candidate Phil Goff compared the campaign to the previous one saying: "It's a lot different from last time, we had a lot of meetings last time, it's been a more aggressive campaign from his [John Tamihere's] side."

Candidate John Tamihere faced controversy for using the term "Sieg Heil" during a debate. After Goff stated "We won't put up with the sort of nonsense that we get from racists coming into this country to tell us that multiculturalism doesn't work," Tamihere responded, "I say sieg heil to that." After the debate, Tamihere initially denied using the term, then stated his comments were a criticism of Goff's actions around a decision to bar controversial Canadian speakers Stefan Molyneux and Lauren Southern from using an Auckland Council venue in 2018, calling Goff "a dictator".

Tamihere made a complaint over three social media posts posted by Phil Goff, but the complaints were rejected by the Advertising Standards Authority.

Some voting booklets contained two incorrect photographs, including showing mayoral candidate Tricia Cheel as a man.

== Endorsements ==
Phil Goff

- New Zealand Labour Party – political party
- David Tua – professional boxer

John Tamihere

- Christine Fletcher – current councillor
- John Banks – former Mayor of Auckland City

== Results ==
2019 Auckland mayoral election
| Party | Candidate | Votes | % | ±% |
|---|---|---|---|---|
| Independent | Phil Goff | 180,146 | 48.97 | +1.68 |
| Independent | John Tamihere | 80,903 | 21.99 | |
| Independent | Craig Lord | 29,577 | 8.04 | |
| Independent | John Hong | 16,211 | 4.40 | |
| Independent | Ted Johnston | 15,637 | 4.25 | |
| Independent | Peter Vaughan | 6,214 | 1.68 | |
| Independent | Michael Coote | 5,611 | 1.52 | |
| STOP Trashing Our Planet | Tricia Cheel | 4,116 | 1.11 | +0.60 |
| Christians Against Abortion | Phil O'Connor | 3,984 | 1.08 | +0.55 |
| Independent | Genevieve Forde | 2,923 | 0.79 | |
| Justice For Families | Susanna Kruger | 2,894 | 0.78 | +0.36 |
| Independent | Tom Sainsbury | 2,853 | 0.77 | |
| Old Skool | Glen Snelgar | 2,608 | 0.70 | |
| The Hemp Foundation | Tadhg Stopford | 2,445 | 0.66 | |
| Independent | Jannaha Henry | 2,417 | 0.65 | |
| LiftNZ | David Feist | 2,301 | 0.62 | |
| Independent | Brendan Maddern | 1,446 | 0.39 | |
| Virtual Homeless Community | Wayne Young | 1,412 | 0.38 | −0.03 |
| Communist League | Annalucia Vermunt | 1,055 | 0.28 | |
| Independent | Thanh Binh Nguyen | 954 | 0.25 | ±0.00 |
| Independent | Alezix Heneti | 514 | 0.13 | −0.02 |
| Total valid votes | | 366,221 | 99.57 | |
| Informal votes | | 1,575 | 0.43 | +0.06 |
| Majority | | 99,243 | 26.98 | +7.85 |
| Turnout | | 367,796 | 34.52 | −3.37 |
| Registered electors | | 1,065,383 | | |

=== By local board ===
Local board subdivisions won by Goff
Local board subdivision won by Lord

| | | Phil Goff | | John Tamihere | | Craig Lord | | John Hong | | Ted Johnston | | Others (Note: Excludes informal votes) | | Total |
| Board | Subdivision (Note: Not all local boards are subdivided) | # | % | # | % | # | % | # | % | # | % | # | % | # |
|---|---|---|---|---|---|---|---|---|---|---|---|---|---|---|
| Albert-Eden | Owairaka | 7,980 | 63.31 | 2,058 | 16.33 | 622 | 4.93 | 386 | 3.06 | 369 | 2.93 | 1189 | 9.43 | 12,604 |
| Albert-Eden | Maungawhau | 7,561 | 58.36 | 2,630 | 20.3 | 495 | 3.82 | 762 | 5.88 | 423 | 3.27 | 1084 | 8.37 | 12,955 |
| Aotea/GreatBarrier | —N/a | 200 | 47.73 | 93 | 22.2 | 30 | 7.16 | 1 | 0.24 | 9 | 2.15 | 86 | 20.53 | 419 |
| Devonport-Takapuna | —N/a | 8,568 | 50.89 | 3,647 | 21.66 | 1,103 | 6.55 | 814 | 4.83 | 825 | 4.9 | 1,880 | 11.17 | 16,837 |
| Franklin | Waiuku | 1,530 | 39.28 | 770 | 19.77 | 737 | 18.92 | 44 | 1.13 | 222 | 5.7 | 592 | 15.2 | 3,895 |
| Franklin | Pukekohe | 3,714 | 43.54 | 1,738 | 20.37 | 1,458 | 17.09 | 87 | 1.02 | 447 | 5.24 | 1,087 | 12.74 | 8,531 |
| Franklin | Wairoa | 3,027 | 45.77 | 1,509 | 22.82 | 899 | 13.59 | 98 | 1.48 | 326 | 4.93 | 755 | 11.42 | 6,614 |
| Henderson-Massey | —N/a | 10,240 | 42.83 | 6,480 | 27.1 | 2,100 | 8.78 | 1,095 | 4.58 | 808 | 3.38 | 3,185 | 13.32 | 23,908 |
| Hibiscus and Bays | Hibiscus Coast | 6,536 | 40.37 | 4,039 | 24.94 | 2,075 | 12.81 | 305 | 1.88 | 968 | 5.98 | 2,269 | 14.01 | 16,192 |
| Hibiscus and Bays | East Coast Bays | 5,731 | 44.01 | 2,825 | 21.7 | 1,176 | 9.03 | 786 | 6.04 | 823 | 6.32 | 1,680 | 12.9 | 13,021 |
| Howick | Pakuranga | 4,866 | 43.53 | 2,442 | 21.85 | 786 | 7.03 | 1,273 | 11.39 | 547 | 4.89 | 1,264 | 11.31 | 11,178 |
| Howick | Howick | 5,525 | 43.77 | 2,878 | 22.8 | 1,061 | 8.4 | 1,118 | 8.86 | 678 | 5.37 | 1,364 | 10.8 | 12,624 |
| Howick | Botany | 5,989 | 45.29 | 2647 | 20.02 | 669 | 5.06 | 1762 | 13.32 | 566 | 4.28 | 1,592 | 12.04 | 13,225 |
| Kaipātiki | —N/a | 10,066 | 48.94 | 3,990 | 19.4 | 1,802 | 8.76 | 1,194 | 5.8 | 780 | 3.79 | 2,738 | 13.31 | 20,570 |
| Māngere-Ōtāhuhu | —N/a | 6,578 | 54.37 | 2,855 | 23.6 | 388 | 3.21 | 156 | 1.29 | 403 | 3.33 | 1,719 | 14.21 | 12,099 |
| Manurewa | —N/a | 7,454 | 48.58 | 3,886 | 25.32 | 795 | 5.18 | 341 | 2.22 | 646 | 4.21 | 2,223 | 14.49 | 15,345 |
| Maungakiekie-Tāmaki | Maungakiekie | 4,157 | 57.95 | 1,361 | 18.97 | 399 | 5.56 | 249 | 3.47 | 298 | 4.15 | 710 | 9.9 | 7,174 |
| Maungakiekie-Tāmaki | Tāmaki | 4,491 | 51.97 | 1,803 | 20.87 | 410 | 4.74 | 318 | 3.68 | 348 | 4.03 | 1,271 | 14.71 | 8,641 |
| Ōrākei | —N/a | 13,799 | 52.9 | 6,602 | 25.31 | 1,296 | 4.97 | 848 | 3.25 | 1,247 | 4.78 | 2,295 | 8.8 | 26,087 |
| Ōtara-Papatoetoe | Papatoetoe | 4,136 | 53.73 | 1,674 | 21.75 | 296 | 3.85 | 215 | 2.79 | 312 | 4.05 | 1,065 | 13.83 | 7,698 |
| Ōtara-Papatoetoe | Otara | 2,527 | 51.81 | 1,304 | 26.74 | 80 | 1.64 | 78 | 1.6 | 188 | 3.85 | 700 | 14.35 | 4,877 |
| Papakura | —N/a | 5,285 | 47.91 | 2,575 | 23.34 | 992 | 8.99 | 207 | 1.88 | 498 | 4.51 | 1,474 | 13.36 | 11,031 |
| Puketāpapa | —N/a | 8,427 | 60.49 | 2,490 | 17.87 | 605 | 4.34 | 844 | 6.06 | 416 | 2.99 | 1,150 | 8.25 | 13,932 |
| Rodney | Wellsford | 308 | 20.37 | 365 | 24.14 | 570 | 37.7 | 16 | 1.06 | 58 | 3.84 | 195 | 12.9 | 1,512 |
| Rodney | Warkworth | 2,499 | 36.2 | 1,793 | 25.97 | 1,256 | 18.19 | 53 | 0.77 | 359 | 5.2 | 943 | 13.66 | 6,903 |
| Rodney | Kumeu | 2,792 | 33.42 | 2,103 | 25.17 | 1,785 | 21.36 | 112 | 1.34 | 425 | 5.09 | 1,138 | 13.62 | 8,355 |
| Rodney | Dairy Flat | 609 | 34.48 | 509 | 28.82 | 226 | 12.8 | 79 | 4.47 | 130 | 7.36 | 213 | 12.06 | 1,766 |
| Upper Harbour | Upper Harbour | 5,831 | 39.7 | 3,307 | 22.52 | 1,544 | 10.51 | 1,380 | 9.4 | 727 | 4.95 | 1,898 | 12.92 | 14,687 |
| Waiheke | —N/a | 1,799 | 54.88 | 608 | 18.55 | 218 | 6.65 | 13 | 0.4 | 178 | 5.43 | 462 | 14.09 | 3,278 |
| Waitākere Ranges | —N/a | 7,231 | 51.33 | 2,771 | 19.67 | 1,698 | 12.05 | 201 | 1.43 | 437 | 3.1 | 1,749 | 12.42 | 14,087 |
| Waitematā | —N/a | 11,342 | 61.46 | 3,535 | 19.16 | 678 | 3.67 | 374 | 2.03 | 658 | 3.57 | 1,867 | 10.12 | 18,454 |
| Whau | —N/a | 9,348 | 52.75 | 3,616 | 20.4 | 1,328 | 7.49 | 1,002 | 5.65 | 518 | 2.92 | 1,910 | 10.78 | 17,722 |
| Total | | 180,146 | 49.19 | 80,903 | 22.09 | 29,577 | 8.08 | 16,211 | 4.43 | 15,637 | 4.27 | 43,747 | 11.95 | 366,221 |

== Turnout ==
Turnout was expected to be lower than in previous elections. Initial counts, while voting was still open, showed turnout to be lower compared with the same time in the 2016 election. The final turnout for Auckland was 34.8%.

== See also ==
- 2019 Auckland local elections
