= Keven Mealamu =

NZ international rugby union player (born 1979)

Keven Mealamu MNZM
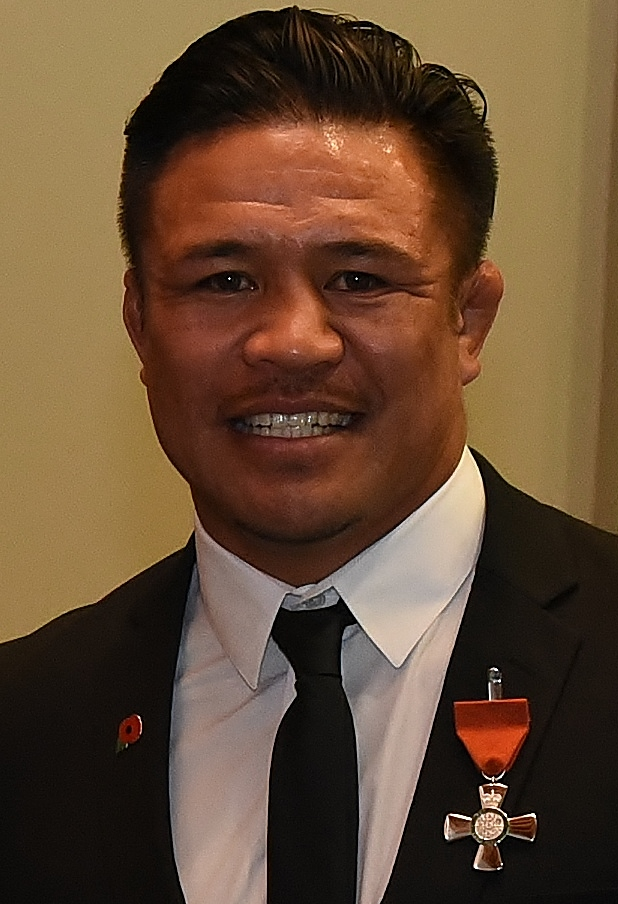
- Born: Keven Filipo Mealamu; 20 March 1979 (age 47) Tokoroa, New Zealand
- Height: 1.81 m (5 ft 11 1/2 in)
- Weight: 111 kg (17 st 7 lb)
- School: Aorere College

Rugby union career
- Position: Hooker
Provincial / State sides
Years	Team	Apps	(Points)
1999–2015	Auckland	65	(70)
Super Rugby
Years	Team	Apps	(Points)
2000–2015	Blues	164	(55)
2002	Chiefs	11	(5)
International career
Years	Team	Apps	(Points)
2002–2015	New Zealand	132	(60)
Medal record
Men's rugby union
Representing New Zealand
Rugby World Cup
Gold medal – first place	2011 New Zealand	Squad
Gold medal – first place	2015 England	Squad

Keven Filipo Mealamu MNZM (born 20 March 1979) is a former New Zealand rugby union footballer. He played at hooker for the Blues in Super Rugby, Auckland in the National Provincial Championship, and the New Zealand national team. He was part of the Blues team that won the 2003 Super 12 title, the third for the franchise. He was a key member of 2011 and 2015 Rugby World Cup winning teams, becoming one of only 21 players who have won the Rugby World Cup on multiple occasions.

In a Bledisloe Cup test match against Australia on 20 October 2012, Mealamu became the third All Black to reach 100 test appearances.

== Early life ==
The grandson of Samoan immigrants, Mealamu was raised in Tokoroa where his father, a body building champion, worked at the local timber mill. The family eventually moved to Auckland due to the decline of the timber industry. He is a former student of Aorere College, where his brother and former Manu Samoa player Luke Mealamu currently works as a social worker. As a schoolboy he played as a flanker for New Zealand Under-16s and New Zealand Schools before switching to hooker in 1998. After finishing school he worked as an apprentice signwriter in case his rugby career did not work out.

== Career ==
Mealamu made his provincial debut for Auckland in 1999 against North Harbour. He first played for the Blues in 2000, but had a stint with the Chiefs in 2002 – the same year he debuted for the All Blacks. Mealamu also made a fine contribution to the start of the All Blacks' 2006 Tri Nations campaign with two tries against the Wallabies during the first match. Mealamu captained the Blues through their 2006 Super 14 campaign, but was forced to relinquish the captaincy in 2007 due to his commitments to the All Blacks. In 2014, he made his 150th appearance for the Blues, becoming the first player in Super Rugby history to make 150 appearances for one team.

=== International ===
Mealamu made his debut for the All Blacks on 23 November 2002, against Wales at Millennium Stadium in Cardiff. He was made test captain in the test match against Scotland during the All Blacks 2008 Grand Slam tour, as regular captain Richie McCaw was a reserve for that match. He was a part of New Zealand's 2011 Rugby World Cup winning squad.

Mealamu was known for his hard-tackling approach to the game.

The 2015 Rugby World Cup final on 31 October was his last match as an All Black. He was one of six senior players who retired from International rugby after the competition.

In the 2016 New Year Honours, Mealamu was appointed a Member of the New Zealand Order of Merit for services to rugby.

==== Leading of the haka ====
Mealamu became an important part of the leadership team of the national side and led the haka for the All Blacks 31 times. He led the Ka Mate version 23 times and the newer Kapa o Pango version 8 times. He first led the team in September 2007 against Italy. In his final international test he led the Kapa o Pango haka before the final against Australia during the 2015 Rugby World Cup.

== Local politics ==
Mealamu was elected to the Papakura Local Board in 2019. In the 2022 Auckland local elections, Mealamu ran for the position of Franklin ward councillor, losing to Andy Baker.

== Personal life ==
Mealamu is a skilled artist and has illustrated several books to raise money for the Starship Children's Hospital. He was appointed to the board of Creative New Zealand in December 2024.

A practising Catholic, Mealamu and his wife Latai, whom he married in 2003, have two children.
