= Bill Cashmore (politician) =

New Zealand politician

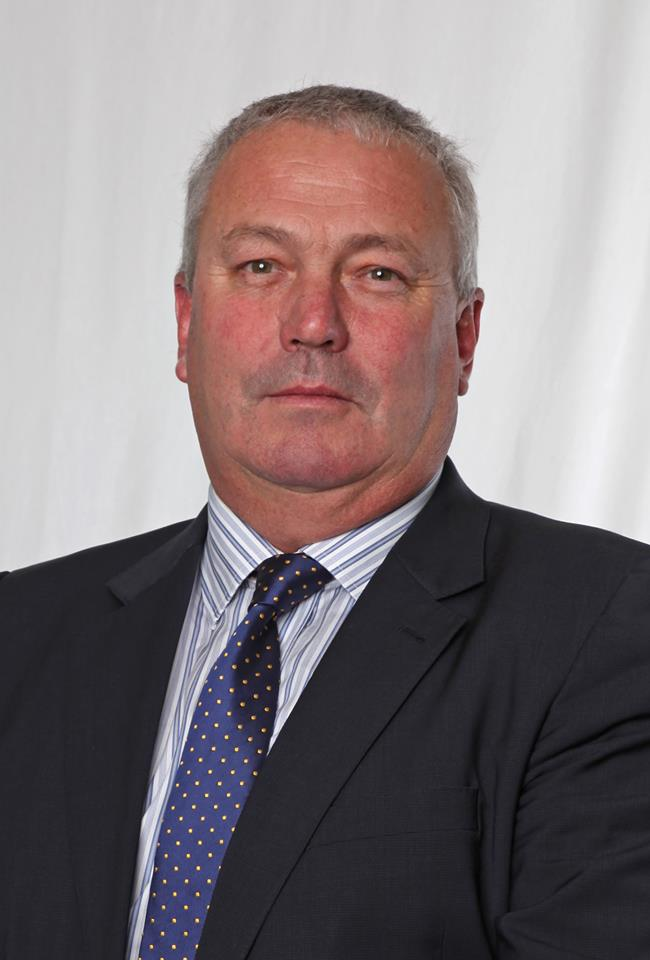

2nd Deputy Mayor of Auckland
- In office 1 November 2016 – 8 October 2022
- Mayor: Phil Goff
- Preceded by: Penny Hulse
- Succeeded by: Desley Simpson

Franklin Ward Councillor
- In office 2013–2022
- Preceded by: Des Morrison
- Succeeded by: Andy Baker

Personal details
- Party: National
- Spouse: Lynnette Cashmore
- Children: 2
- Education: King's College
- Profession: Farmer

Bill Cashmore is a New Zealand local government politician, the former deputy mayor of Auckland, and represented the Franklin ward on the Auckland Council from 2013 to 2022. He retired following the 2022 local elections.

== Personal life ==
Educated at Orere School and King's College, Cashmore with his father and brother on their family farm until taking over as owner and manager in 1989. He is married to Lynnette Cashmore and has two sons.

== Political career ==
Cashmore's political career began when he was elected as a member of the Clevedon community board in 1991. He would go on to become the Chairman between 1992 and 1994. Between 1994 and 2000 he was a member of the Auckland Regional Council Environmental Management Committee and in 2009 and 2010 he was a member of the Auckland Regional Council Rural Liaison group. In 2010 he became the Federated Farmers executive for the Auckland Province and a representative to the Animal health board.

He is a member of the New Zealand National Party.

=== Auckland Council ===
Auckland Council
Years	Ward	Affiliation
2013–2016	Franklin	C&R Team Franklin
2016–2019	Franklin	Team Franklin
2019–2022	Franklin	Team Franklin

Following the amalgamation of councils and community boards in 2010 into the Auckland Council, Cashmore ran for, and was elected as a member of, the Franklin Local Board. He then went on to become Deputy chair of the board in 2011. In 2013 he was elected as an Auckland Councillor, replacing the incumbent, Des Morrison, who had retired. He was appointed chair of the Auckland Council's rural advisory panel. In 2015 he became the chair of the Audit and Risk Committee and a member of the Political steering group for the Auckland Transport Alignment Project. He was re-elected unopposed in 2016, and re-elected unopposed again in 2019.

==== Deputy mayor ====
Following Phil Goff's election as mayor of Auckland in 2016, Cashmore was picked as deputy mayor. As a result of his appointment, Cashmore was appointed to the Appointments and Performance Review, Civil Defence & Emergency Management, Community Development and Safety, Regulatory, and Auckland Domain Committees, as an ex-officio member. Cashmore did not stand for re-election at the 2022 local elections.
