= Hauraki =

Hauraki (Māori for 'north wind') may refer to the following in New Zealand:

- Hauraki, Auckland, a suburb of North Shore, Auckland
- Hauraki District, a municipality in the Waikato Region
- Hauraki Plains, a flatland in the Waikato Region
- Hauraki Gulf, a coastal feature of the northern North Island
- Hauraki iwi, a group of iwi around the Hauraki Gulf
- Radio Hauraki, a radio network
- Hauraki (general electorate), 1928 to 1996
- Hauraki (Māori electorate), 1999 to 2002
- Hauraki-Waikato, a Māori electorate since 2008
