= Franklin ward =

- Ward of Auckland
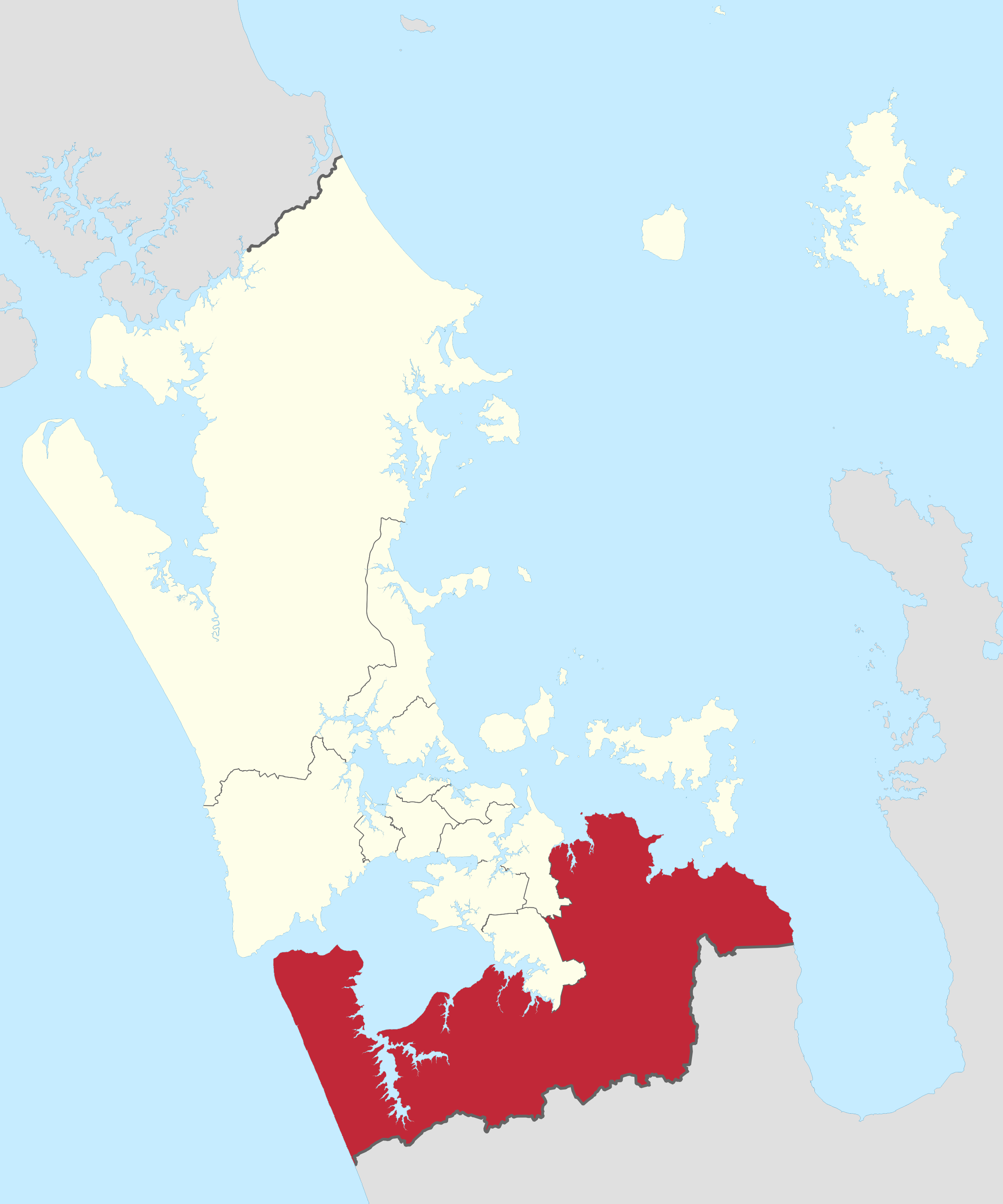
- Country: New Zealand
- Island: North Island
- Region: Auckland Region

Area
  - Land: 1,199.39 km^{2} (463.09 sq mi)

Population (June 2025)
  - Total: 89,900
  - Density: 75.0/km^{2} (194/sq mi)

The Franklin ward is the southernmost ward on the Auckland Council. The Franklin ward has one local board, also called Franklin; the Franklin Local Board has three subdivisions - Wairoa, Pukekohe and Waiuku. Franklin is currently represented by Andy Baker.

== Demographics ==
Franklin ward covers 1,199.39 km^{2} (463.09 sq mi) and had an estimated population of 89,900 as of June 2025, with a population density of 75 people per km^{2}.

Historical population
Year	Pop.	±% p.a.
2006	58,605	—
2013	65,319	+1.56%
2018	74,838	+2.76%
2023	84,357	+2.42%

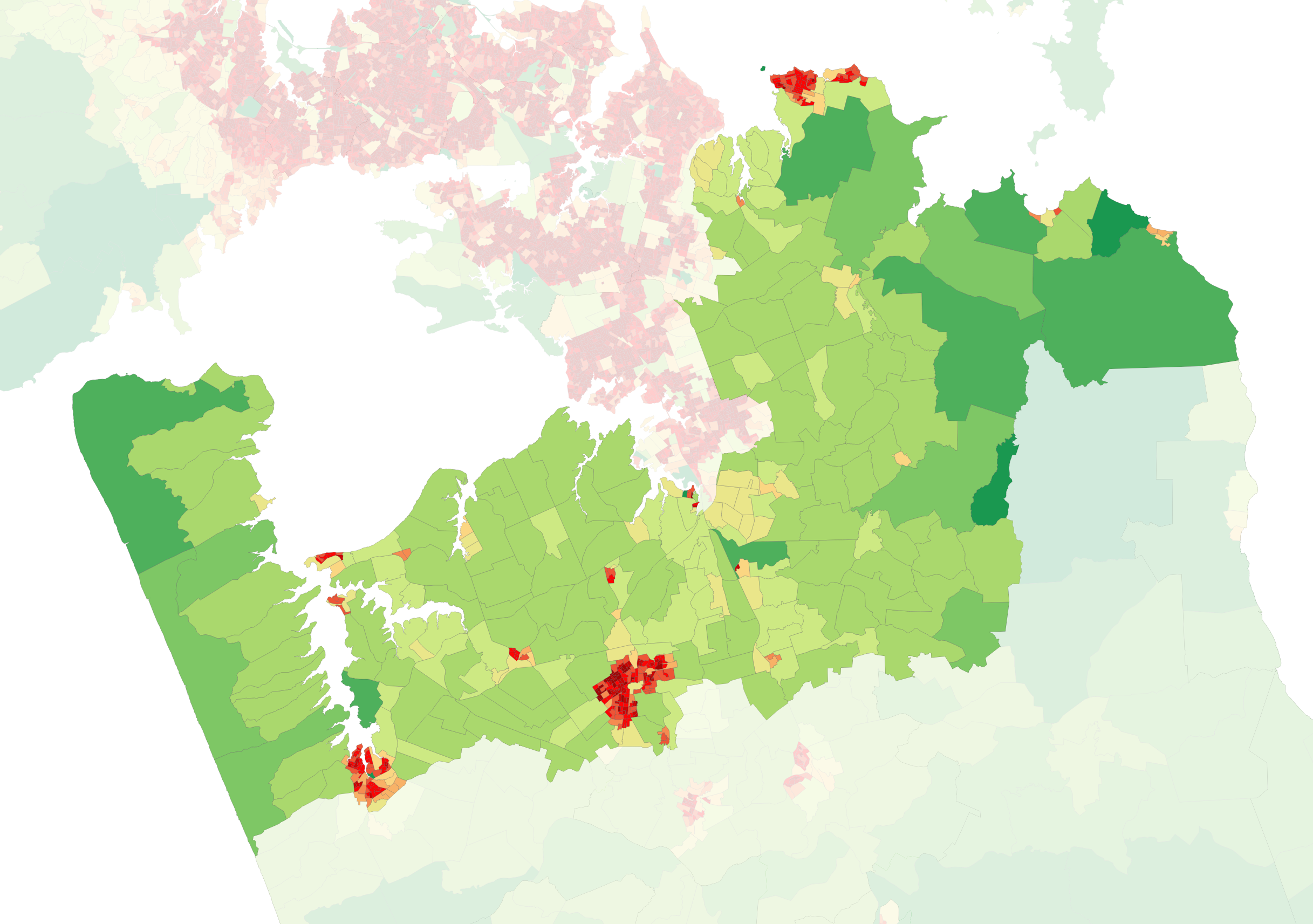
Population density in the 2023 census

Franklin ward had a population of 84,357 in the 2023 New Zealand census, an increase of 9,519 people (12.7%) since the 2018 census, and an increase of 19,038 people (29.1%) since the 2013 census. There were 41,865 males, 42,252 females and 243 people of other genders in 28,884 dwellings. 2.4% of people identified as LGBTIQ+. The median age was 40.1 years (compared with 38.1 years nationally). There were 16,929 people (20.1%) aged under 15 years, 14,274 (16.9%) aged 15 to 29, 39,231 (46.5%) aged 30 to 64, and 13,923 (16.5%) aged 65 or older.

People could identify as more than one ethnicity. The results were 77.0% European (Pākehā); 16.6% Māori; 7.3% Pasifika; 12.5% Asian; 1.1% Middle Eastern, Latin American and African New Zealanders (MELAA); and 2.3% other, which includes people giving their ethnicity as "New Zealander". English was spoken by 96.2%, Māori language by 2.8%, Samoan by 0.8%, and other languages by 14.0%. No language could be spoken by 2.0% (e.g. too young to talk). New Zealand Sign Language was known by 0.4%. The percentage of people born overseas was 25.6, compared with 28.8% nationally.

Religious affiliations were 31.7% Christian, 2.4% Hindu, 0.9% Islam, 1.0% Māori religious beliefs, 0.6% Buddhist, 0.3% New Age, 0.1% Jewish, and 2.6% other religions. People who answered that they had no religion were 53.0%, and 7.5% of people did not answer the census question.

Of those at least 15 years old, 14,595 (21.6%) people had a bachelor's or higher degree, 36,210 (53.7%) had a post-high school certificate or diploma, and 16,632 (24.7%) people exclusively held high school qualifications. The median income was $47,300, compared with $41,500 nationally. 11,331 people (16.8%) earned over $100,000 compared to 12.1% nationally. The employment status of those at least 15 was that 36,495 (54.1%) people were employed full-time, 8,811 (13.1%) were part-time, and 1,698 (2.5%) were unemployed.

== Councillors ==
Franklin Ward Councillor of Auckland
- Incumbent; Andy Baker since 2022
- Term length: Three years
- Inaugural holder: Des Morrison
- Formation: 1 November 2010
- Website: www.aucklandcouncil.govt.nz

Election	Councillor elected	Affiliation	Votes	Notes
2010	Des Morrison	C&R Team Franklin	10,651	
2013	Bill Cashmore	C&R Team Franklin	8,178	
2016	Bill Cashmore	Team Franklin	elected unopposed	Appointed Deputy Mayor of Auckland by mayor Phil Goff after Goff won the 2016 Auckland mayoral election.
2019	Bill Cashmore	Team Franklin	elected unopposed	
2022	Andy Baker	Team Franklin	14,187	
2025	Andy Baker	Team Franklin	10,912	

== Election results ==
Election Results for the Franklin Ward:

=== 2025 ===
Franklin ward
Affiliation	Candidate	Votes	%
Team Franklin	Andy Baker^{†}	10,912	56.82
ACT Local	Dene Green	4,395	22.89
Independent	Les Thomas	3,341	17.40
Informal		21	0.11
Blank		534	2.78
Turnout		19,203	31.88
Registered		60,244	
Team Franklin hold			
^{†} incumbent

=== 2022 ===
Franklin Ward
Affiliation		Candidate	Votes	%
#40BDF2	Team Franklin	Andy Baker	14,187	58.39
	Independent	Keven Mealamu	9,279	38.19
Informal			10	0.04
Blank			820	3.38
Turnout			24,296	
