= Des Morrison =

Des Morrison may refer to:

- Des Morrison (politician)
- Des Morrison (boxer)
