= Penny Bright =

- Born: 8 September 1954
- Died: 4 October 2018 (aged 64)
- Occupation: Activist

Penelope Mary Bright (8 September 1954 – 4 October 2018) was a New Zealand activist who protested for increased government transparency, against the 1981 Springbok tour, and for other left-wing issues.

== Biography ==
Bright studied at Kuranui College, and organised Halt All Racist Tours while she was a high school student. Following high school, Bright worked as a sheet-metal welder and as a welding tutor at Manukau Polytechnic.

In 1998, Bright and others founded the Water Pressure Group. The Water Pressure Group was formed to challenge Auckland City Council's water company Metrowater and its use of user pays charges. In 2000, Bright and the Water Pressure Group attempted to hose the Bolivian embassy in Remuera using a vintage firetruck in protest against locked-out workers in Bolivia.

Bright was arrested multiple times during her time as an activist, and by 2010 she had been arrested 22 times. Two notable arrests were when she was forcibly removed from two different Auckland City Council meeting by then mayors John Banks and Dick Hubbard.

Bright received considerable media coverage for her use of the Privacy Act and Official Information Act, under which she filed many requests, particularly about how the different Auckland territorial and unitary authorities (e.g., Auckland Council) spent money, and about their relationship with private business.

In 2007, Bright stopped paying the rates on her house in Kingsland as a protest against what she perceived to be corruption in Auckland Council. In 2018, the Auckland High Court ordered the sale of Bright's house to recoup the missing rates and legal fees of $90,000. In 2018, Bright resolved the outstanding debts by agreeing to a rates postponement.

In 2010, 2013 and 2016, Bright was a candidate for the Auckland mayoralty. Bright was also a candidate for the 2017 Mount Albert by-election. Her best electoral showing was in a 2000 by-election for the Avondale/Roskill Ward of the Auckland City Council, in which Bright finished a close second with 31.61% of the vote, beating the City Vision candidate into third place.

In May 2018, Bright announced she had inoperable and incurable ovarian cancer. Bright died on 4 October 2018, aged 64.
