= Andy Baker (politician) =

New Zealand politician

Councillor Andy Baker

Franklin ward Councillor
- Incumbent
- Assumed office 2022
- Preceded by: Bill Cashmore

Personal details
- Party: Team Franklin

Andy Baker is a New Zealand politician who is an Auckland Councillor. In 2022, Baker was elected as a councillor for the Franklin ward.

== Early life ==
Baker was born and raised in Drury. Before entering local body politics, Baker worked as a policeman, as a dairy farmer, and as a restaurateur, opening the Two Fat Cows bar and restaurant in Drury.

== Political career ==
Auckland Council
Years	Ward	Affiliation
2022–present	Franklin	Team Franklin

Baker became an Franklin Local Board member in 2010, serving as the board's chair.

In the 2022 local body elections, Baker ran against former All Black Keven Mealamu, and was elected as the councillor for the Franklin ward.

Baker ran for and won re-election as a councillor in the 2025 elections.
