= Mayor of Auckland =

Head of the Auckland Council

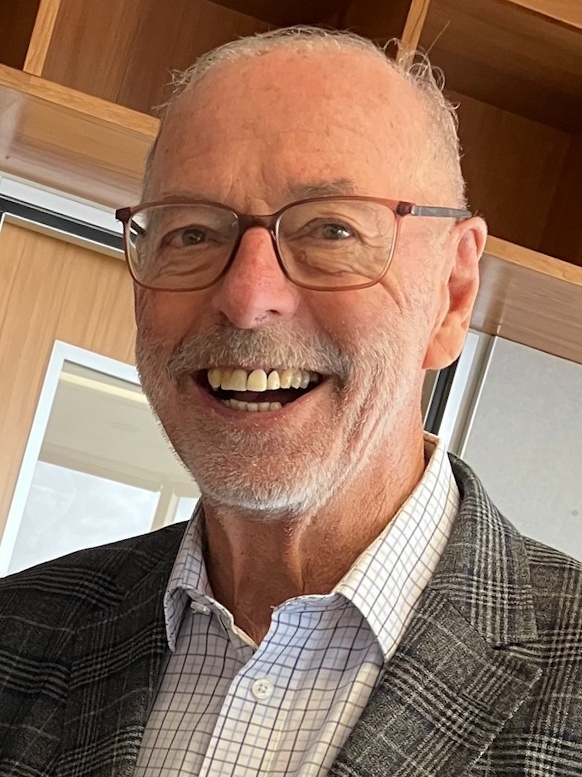
- Incumbent; Wayne Brown since 28 October 2022
- Auckland Council
- Style: His Worship
- Type: Council leader
- Member of: Auckland Council
- Seat: Auckland Town Hall
- Appointer: Electorate of Auckland
- Term length: Three years, renewable
- Inaugural holder: Len Brown
- Formation: 1 November 2010
- Deputy: Desley Simpson
- Salary: $269,500 p.a.
- Website: Official website

The mayor of Auckland is the elected head of local government in the Auckland Region of New Zealand's North Island; one of 67 mayors in the country. The principal city of the region is Auckland. The mayor presides over the Auckland Council and is directly elected using the first-past-the-post method.

The position has existed since 2010 when the previously existing authorities in the region were merged into one region-wide authority.

== Background ==
The position was first filled by election on 9 October 2010 for the establishment of the Auckland Council on 1 November 2010. The Council replaced seven territorial authority councils, including the Auckland City Council, and also the Auckland Regional Council. Before 2010, "Mayor of Auckland" was an informal term applied to the Mayor of Auckland City, head of the Auckland City Council.

Until October 2013, when new mayoral powers set out in the Local Government Act 2002 Amendment Act 2012 came into effect, the Mayor of Auckland had more powers compared to other mayors in New Zealand.

== Role of mayor ==
The mayor has the powers to establish their own office, create and dissolve governing body committees and appoint the chairpersons of the council's committees. The mayor chairs the governing body and may exercise a casting vote if a tie arises during a vote.

== History of mayoral contests ==
During the first mayoral election for Auckland Council in 2010, outgoing Mayor of Manukau City Len Brown was elected, defeating outgoing Mayor of Auckland City John Banks, outgoing Mayor of North Shore City Andrew Williams and prominent Christian businessman Colin Craig, amongst others. The mayoral office had a budget of $4.1 million and a staff of 18 in 2011. Brown preferred not to use the honorific "His Worship".

Contenders in the 2013 Auckland mayoral election included Brown, John Minto and John Palino. Brown was re-elected.

Brown announced in November 2015 that he would not contest the 2016 mayoral election. There were 19 contenders for the position, and Phil Goff won with 49% of the vote, against Victoria Crone, John Palino, and Chlöe Swarbrick.

In the 2019 mayoral election, Goff won re-election against 21 contenders with 49% of the vote. Other contenders who received a high share of the vote include John Tamihere (22%), Craig Lord (8%), John Hong (4%) and Ted Johnston (4%).

In February 2022, Goff announced he would not stand in the October 2022 mayoral election. The election was won by Wayne Brown, with 45% of the vote.

== List of mayors ==
| # | Name | Portrait | Elections | Entered office | Left office | Deputy |
|---|---|---|---|---|---|---|
| 1 | Len Brown | | 2010; 2013 | October 2010 | 14 October 2016 | Penny Hulse |
| 2 | Phil Goff | | 2016; 2019 | 15 October 2016 | 15 October 2022 | Bill Cashmore |
| 3 | Wayne Brown | | 2022; 2025 | 16 October 2022 | Incumbent | Desley Simpson |

== Role of deputy mayor ==
The deputy mayor is the second highest elected official in the Auckland Council. The deputy mayor acts in support of the Mayor of Auckland. It is the second highest elected position in the council. However, like the position of Deputy Prime Minister, this seniority does not necessarily translate into power. They are appointed by the mayor from the elected ward councillors. The current deputy mayor is Desley Simpson, who represents the Ōrākei ward on the Auckland Council. Simpson was selected to be deputy by incoming mayor Wayne Brown.

Beyond committees of the whole council, the deputy mayor is an ex-officio member of the following Auckland Council committees:

- Performance and Appointments Committee
- Audit and Risk Committee
- Civil Defence & Emergency Management Committee
- Community Development and Safety Committee
- Council-Controlled Organisation Direction and Oversight Committee
- Expenditure Control and Procurement Committee
- Regulatory and Safety Committee
- Auckland Domain Committee

Like any other councillor, the deputy mayor may be appointed to additional committees which the mayor wishes to appoint them to.

== List of deputy mayors ==
| Mayor | | Deputy mayor | | Ward represented | Affiliation | Assumed office | Left office |
|---|---|---|---|---|---|---|---|
| 1 | Len Brown | 1 | Penny Hulse | Waitākere Ward | Independent | 1 November 2010 | 8 October 2016 |
| 1 | Len Brown | 1 | Penny Hulse | Waitākere Ward | West at Heart | 1 November 2010 | 8 October 2016 |
| 2 | Phil Goff | 2 | Bill Cashmore | Franklin Ward | Team Franklin | 1 November 2016 | 8 October 2022 |
| 3 | Wayne Brown | 3 | Desley Simpson | Ōrākei ward | Communities & Residents | 28 October 2022 | |
