= Ka Mate =

Ngāti Toa haka

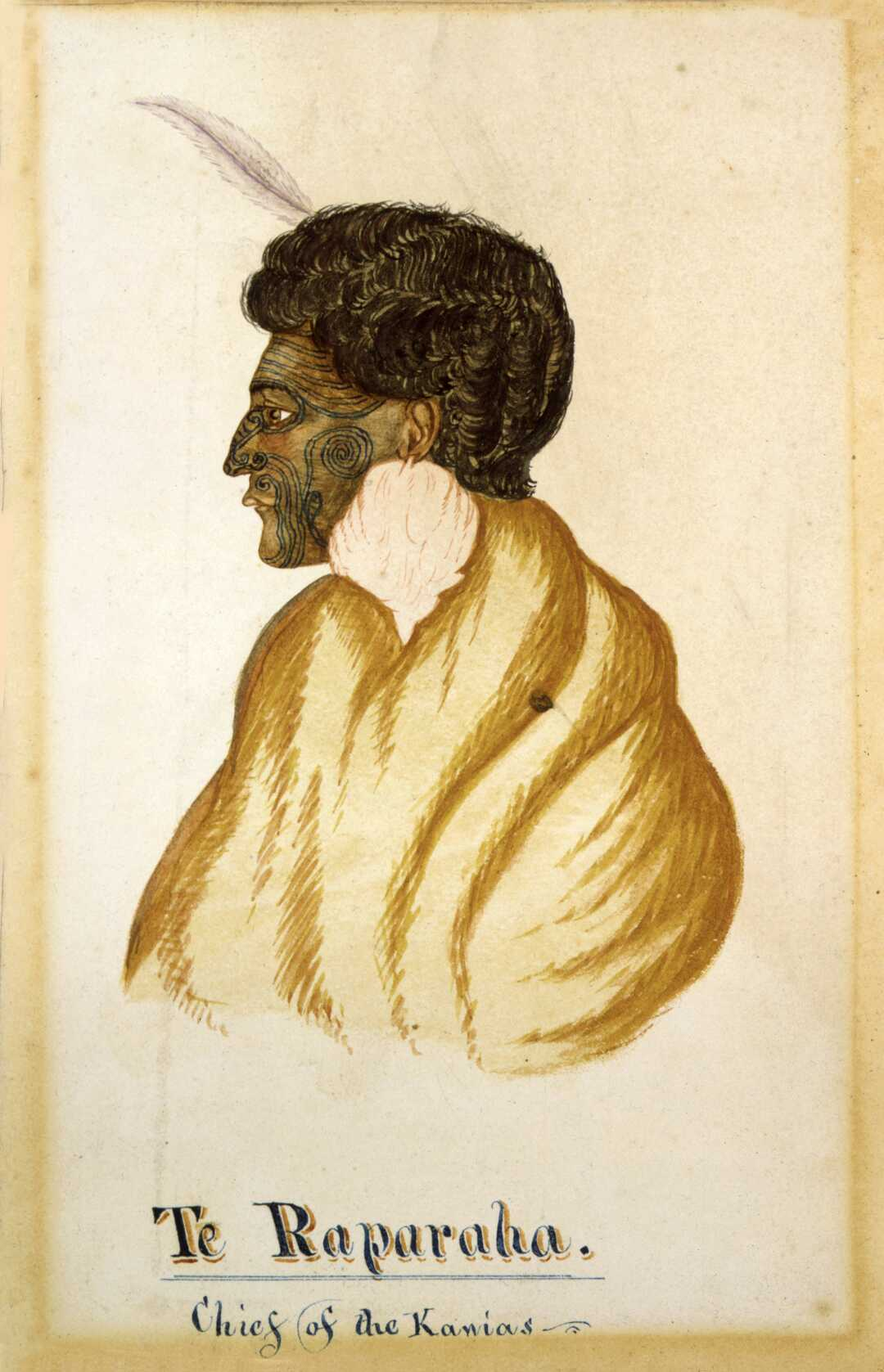
Te Rauparaha, Ngāti Toa chief, 1840s

Ka Mate ([ˈkaˌmatɛ]) is a Māori haka composed by Te Rauparaha, the historic leader of the iwi of Ngāti Toa of the North Island of New Zealand during the Musket Wars.

== Composition ==
Te Rauparaha composed Ka Mate around 1820 as a celebration of life over death after his lucky escape from pursuing Ngāti Maniapoto and Waikato enemies. He had hidden from them, on Motuopihi Island in Lake Rotoaira, in a kūmara storage pit while a woman (wāhine) by the name of Rangikoaea straddled the pit to hide and protect him. Upon emerging from the pit and into the sun he was grateful to Rangikoaea and her husband Te Wharerangi, composing the Ka Mate haka as a result.

The haka as composed by Te Rauparaha begins with a chant:

Kikiki! Kakaka!
Kauana kei waniwania taku tara
kei tarawahia, kei te rua i te kerokero!
He pounga rahui te uira
ka rarapa ketekete kau ana
To peru kairiri mau au e koro e!
Hi! Ha! – Ka wehi au ka matakana,
ko wai te tangata kia rere ure tirohanga
ngā rua rerarera
ngā rua kuri kakanui i raro! Aha ha!

Translation:

Let your valor rise! Let your valor rage!
Let us ward off these haunted hands
to protect our wives and children!
For thee, I defy
the storms of hell
while my enemies stand there unknowingly!
To think I would tremble
to a pack of wolves either seeing fear or running away,
because they would surely fall into the pit of shame
as food for the hounds to chow down on in delight!!

Then follows the main body of the haka:

Ka mate, ka mate! Ka ora, ka ora!
Ka mate, ka mate! Ka ora, ka ora!
Tēnei te tangata pūhuruhuru
Nāna nei i tiki mai whakawhiti te rā
Ā, upane! Ka upane!
Ā, upane, ka upane, whiti te rā!

Translation:

It is death, it is death, it is life, it is life
It is death, it is death, it is life, it is life
Or do I see a hairy man
who brought back the Sun so it can shine on me once more?
Then I will put one foot in front of the other—
One foot, then the other—until the Sun shines on me!

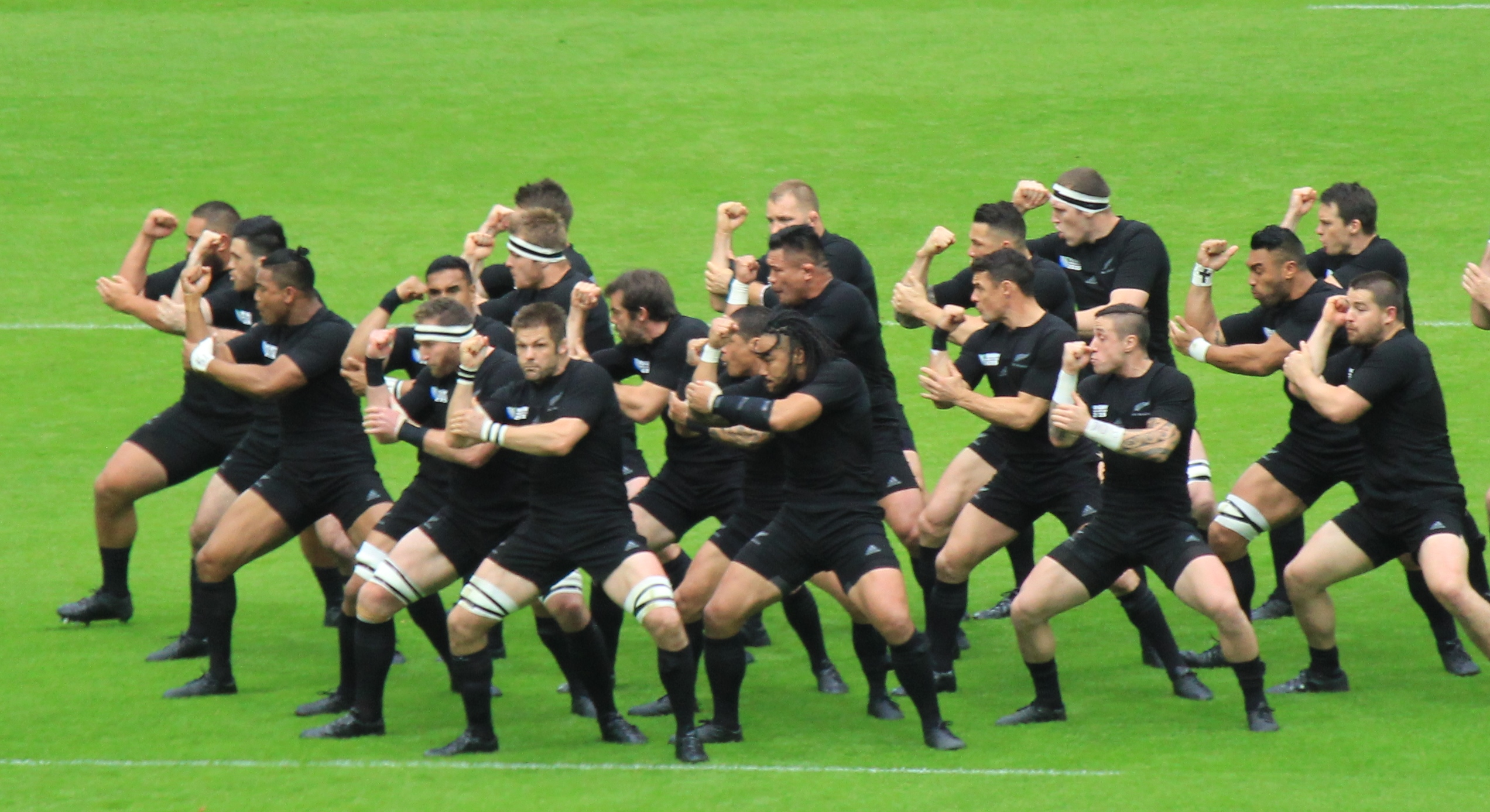
The All Blacks performing the Ka Mate haka

Ka Mate was conceived as a brief energising haka of the ngeri type, where, in the absence of set movements, the performers are free to extemporise their chanting and movement as they feel fit, without any need for synchronisation.

== Use in rugby ==
External videos
- "Ka Mate", accompanied by a translation — via YouTube

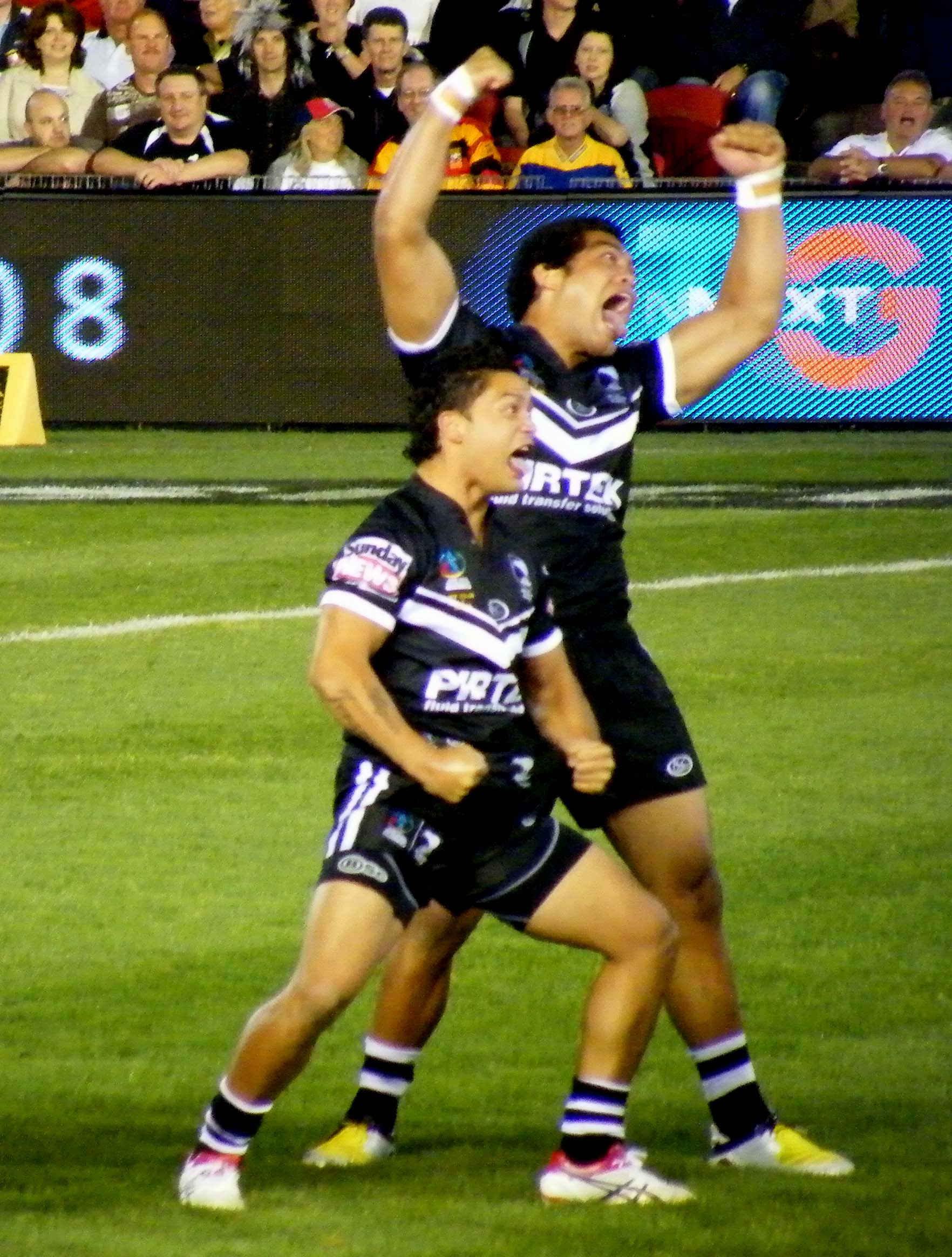
Issac Luke and Adam Blair of the New Zealand national rugby league team performing "Ka Mate"

"Ka Mate" is the most widely known haka both New Zealand and worldwide because a choreographed and synchronised version of the chant has traditionally been performed by the All Blacks, New Zealand's international rugby union team, as well as the Kiwis, New Zealand's international rugby league team, immediately prior to test (international) matches until 2013, when a specific haka, "Te Iwi Kiwi", was used instead. Since 2005 the All Blacks have occasionally performed another haka, "Kapa o Pango". Since the introduction of "Kapa o Pango" the longest sequence of "Ka Mate" performances by the All Blacks is nine, which has occurred twice between 22 August 2009 and 12 June 2010 and also between 13 August 2022 and 19 November 2022. Before the end of the 2003 Rugby World Cup, the performance of the Ka Mate by the All Blacks usually ended with a mid-air leap.

Prior to 1985 the All Blacks haka was not performed with the usual performance, as most players of European ancestry had no full training on the ceremony. It took two Māori during this time (Buck Shelford and Hika Reid) to revolutionise the way it was delivered, culminating in a style close to the original haka. The non-Māori players from this point on learnt how to perform.

In an interview with ESPN shortly before the 2019 Rugby World Cup, All Blacks scrum-half TJ Perenara, the team's designated haka leader at the time and a Māori who was raised in the region where Te Rauparaha lived, explained the process of selecting which haka will be performed before a given match:

There's Ka Mate and there's Kapa O Pango. When we're in Wellington we perform Ka Mate, we're paying respects to Te Rauparaha and the lands that he walked on. And then outside of that Reado [captain Kieran Read] and myself will usually talk [on match eve] or earlier in the week about what we'll do; what haka we'll do for that week. And it's usually just a vibe thing; how we feel; how we feel like our footy's going and who we're playing against. There's no massive reason for doing either one except for when we're in Wellington we always do Ka Mate.

=== List of players that have led Ka Mate ===
Incomplete list of All Blacks players that have led the Ka Mate version of the haka:

- Piri Weepu (26)
- TJ Perenara (26)
- Keven Mealamu (23)
- Aaron Smith (21)
- Richie McCaw (11)
- Liam Messam (9)
- Rico Gear (6+)
- Carl Hayman (5)
- Hosea Gear (4)
- Dane Coles (4)
- Aaron Mauger (2)
- Kieran Read (1)
- Mils Muliaina (1)
- Tawera Kerr-Barlow (1)
- Nehe Milner-Skudder (1)
- Sam Cane (1)
- Codie Taylor (1)
- Ardie Savea (1)
- Tana Umaga
- George Nēpia
- Buck Shelford
- Taine Randell
- John Timu
- Carlos Spencer
- Zinzan Brooke
- Norm Hewitt (3)
- Hika Reid
- Frank Shelford
- Jamie Joseph (1995 Rugby World Cup, vs Wales and Ireland)
- Sid Going
- Steve McDowall
- Daryl Gibson (2000, vs France)
- Caleb Ralph (2002, vs South Africa)
- Bill Bush (1978, vs Ireland)
- Stu Wilson (1979, vs England)
- Kees Meeuws (2001, vs Argentina)
- Bryan Williams (1978, vs England)
- Greg Feek (2001, vs Ireland)
- Brian Lochore (1967, vs Wales and vs England)
- Eddie Dunn (1979, vs Scotland)
- Andy Dalton (1979, vs Northern Division)

Numbers in brackets indicate how many times each player has led the "Ka Mate" haka. (correct as of 8 July 2023)

=== Teams who have faced Ka Mate ===
In total all 22 international rugby union sides that have played the All Blacks have faced "Ka Mate" at least once before a test match. There are ten teams that have faced either "Ka Mate", "Kapa o Pango", another haka or no prematch haka:

- Australia
- South Africa
- England
- France
- Wales
- Ireland
- British & Irish Lions
- Scotland
- Argentina (29)
- Namibia (2)

There are 12 international rugby union sides who have always faced "Ka Mate" before a match against the All Blacks:

- Italy (16)
- Fiji (7)
- Samoa (7)
- Tonga (7)
- Canada (6)
- Japan (5)
- United States (4)
- World XV (3, 1 win)
- Romania (2)
- Pacific Islanders (1)
- Portugal (1)
- Georgia (1)

All of the above 60 games were won by the All Blacks except for one against the World XV on 18 April 1992. (Note: This does not include their 2 1949 matches against Rhodesia as the All Blacks refused to perform a haka due to no Māori players being on the team, The All Blacks lost one and drew the other.) Numbers in brackets indicate how many times each team has faced the "Ka Mate" haka.

== Use in politics ==
On 14 November 2024, lawmaker Hana-Rawhiti Maipi-Clarke — representing Te Pāti Māori as a Member of Parliament since 2023 — protested a first reading of the Treaty Principles Bill that attempts to clarify interpretations of an 1840 Treaty of Waitangi between the Māori and The Crown by tearing a copy of the bill in half while leading "Ka Mate" with the rest of her party, along with other opposition MPs and even the public gallery. Following this, the Speaker, Gerry Brownlee, suspended Parliament for 20 minutes and called for the gallery to be cleared, as well as naming Maipi-Clarke for her actions, suspending her from Parliament for 24 hours and docking her pay.

== Ownership ==
Between 1998 and 2006, Ngāti Toa attempted to trademark "Ka Mate" to prevent its use by commercial organisations without their permission. In 2006, the Intellectual Property Office of New Zealand declined their claim on the grounds that "Ka Mate" had achieved wide recognition in New Zealand and abroad as representing New Zealand as a whole and not a particular trader. In March 2011, New Zealand Rugby Union came to an amicable agreement with the iwi not to bring the mana of the haka into disrepute.

In 2009, as a part of a wider settlement of grievances, the New Zealand government agreed to:

"...record the authorship and significance of the haka Ka Mate to Ngāti Toa and ... work with Ngāti Toa to address their concerns with the haka... [but] does not expect that redress will result in royalties for the use of Ka Mate or provide Ngāti Toa with a veto on the performance of Ka Mate...".

== In popular culture ==
In 2021, Glen Osborne turned the body of the haka into a ballad in C major.

In the 2019 DLC for Civilization VI, Gathering Storm, the main theme for the added Māori civilisation is "Ka Mate" and "Pōkarekare Ana". The theme has four renditions, each corresponding to a different era in the game. These renditions were composed by Geoff Knorr and Phill Boucher.

== See also ==
- Haka in sports
- Kapa haka
- Kapa o Pango
- Māori music
