= Kapa o Pango =

Haka used by the New Zealand All Blacks

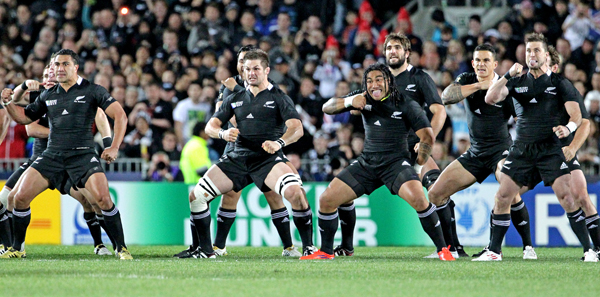
The All Blacks performing "Kapa o Pango" in 2011

Kapa o Pango is a pre-match haka, or challenge, composed by Derek Lardelli, which is unique to the New Zealand national rugby union team, the All Blacks. Since 2005, the "Kapa o Pango" haka has been performed a total of 98 times before rugby test matches by the All Blacks as an alternative to the usual "Ka Mate" haka. "Kapa o Pango" is a Māori phrase which translates to "Team in Black" in English.

In all the eleven tests against an international rugby team "Kapa o Pango" has been performed for the first time the All Blacks have gone on to win the match. Only six sides have ever beaten the All Blacks in a match in which "Kapa o Pango" occurred. They are: South Africa (2006), Australia (2007), England (2012), Ireland (2016), France (2023) and Wales (2026). The year in brackets is the first time a loss occurred against this team with this version of the haka.

When "Kapa o Pango" has been performed the All Blacks have won 75 tests, lost 20 tests and have drawn three times. The biggest winning margin to the All Blacks for a test involving the "Kapa o Pango" haka was 57 points and occurred on 16 September 2017 against South Africa at North Harbour Stadium Albany, Auckland, New Zealand where the score was 57–0.

The biggest losing margin involving the All Blacks for a test with the "Kapa o Pango" haka is 28 points which occurred in a test against South Africa at Twickenham Stadium on 25 August 2023, final score 35–7. The longest sequence of "Kapa o Pango" performances is seven, which occurred during 2023. In every Rugby World Cup knockout match since 2011 (and including) the version of the haka performed has been "Kapa o Pango" Ten players have led "Kapa o Pango" with eight being of Māori descent and two of Samoan descent.

== History ==
=== 2005–2009 ===
In August 2005, before the Tri-Nations test match between New Zealand and South Africa at Carisbrook stadium in Dunedin, the All Blacks performed a new haka, "Kapa o Pango", specially composed by Derek Lardelli and "...designed to reflect the multi-cultural make-up of contemporary New Zealand – in particular the influence of Polynesian cultures". This new haka was to be reserved for special occasions and was not intended to replace "Ka Mate".

John Smit, the Springbok captain who faced the debut performance of "Kapa o Pango", said after the match: "To stand there and watch it for the first time was a privilege." The Daily Telegraph columnist Mick Cleary criticised the new haka as "unmistakably provocative", adding: "There is a fine line and the All Blacks crossed it. Carisbrook is a rugby field not a back-street alley."

England became the second team to face "Kapa o Pango" when it was performed before a test match at Twickenham on 19 November 2005. The All Blacks performed "Kapa o Pango" on 8 July 2006 in Christchurch against Australia, making the Wallabies the third team to face this version of the haka. The first time the All Blacks went on to lose a match after performing "Kapa o Pango" was on 2 September 2006 in a game against South Africa in Newlands, Cape Town, which the Springboks won 22–16.

France's head coach Bernard Laporte requested New Zealand not to perform "Kapa o Pango" during their November 2006 tour of France, claiming "It's no good for the promotion of our sport." Despite this complaint, the following year in Auckland on 2 June 2007, France faced "Kapa o Pango" for the first time and became the fourth rugby side to do so.

At the 2007 Rugby World Cup, the All Blacks did not perform "Kapa o Pango" before their quarter-final against France. This remains the only world cup knockout stage match to not feature the new haka since its inception. The only time "Kapa o Pango" was performed at the 2007 tournament was in a pool match against Scotland on 23 September 2007, making the Scottish national team the fifth to face "Kapa o Pango" before a match for the first time.

"Kapa o Pango" was performed for the first time against Ireland in Dublin on 15 November 2008, making them the sixth side to witness this version of the pre-match haka. One week later, Wales became the seventh side to experience "Kapa o Pango" for the first time when it was performed before a test match at Millennium Stadium. The Welsh players stood stationary and stared down the All Blacks during and after the haka, with the New Zealand team eventually losing the stare off but winning the match.

=== 2010–2019 ===
On 24 September 2011, the All Blacks performed "Kapa o Pango" before their Pool A match against France at Eden Park, which included the act of drawing the thumb across the throat at the end. At the knockout stage of the previous World Cup, the French team had eliminated New Zealand in the quarter-finals. The new haka became a fixture during the 2011 World Cup knockout stage, before the All Blacks met France again (and defeated them) in the final. Argentina were the eighth national team to witness their first "Kapa o Pango" when the All Blacks performed it before the World Cup quarter-final in Auckland on 9 October 2011.

Video of "Kapa o Pango" being performed in 2016

The All Blacks performed "Kapa o Pango" eight times during 2014, the highest number of performances in any one year since its inception. Also in 2014, there occurred the longest streak of four consecutive "Kapa o Pango" performances. At the 2015 Rugby World Cup, the All Blacks performed the new haka before all of their knockout round matches; however, following their victory in the final against Australia, an additional "Ka Mate" haka was performed post match.

As a mark of respect for Anthony Foley, the Ireland team formed a 'Figure 8' response when they faced the "Kapa o Pango" on 5 November 2016 at Soldier Field stadium in Chicago. The Irish team went on to win the match. When the British & Irish Lions toured New Zealand in 2017, the All Blacks performed "Kapa o Pango" ahead of the first and third tests, making the Lions the ninth side to face the new haka.

For the 2019 Rugby World Cup, "Kapa o Pango" was used against South Africa in the pool stages and Ireland in the quarter-finals, as well as Wales in the bronze play-off match. When performed against Ireland, the sounds of the haka were drowned out by Irish fans singing the song “The Fields of Athenry”. In New Zealand's semi-final match against England at the World Cup, the English players stood in a 'V' formation when the All Blacks performed "Kapa o Pango". England won the match but were later fined for crossing the halfway line.

=== 2020–2023 ===
In a test against Argentina on 28 November 2020, the All Blacks presented a shirt before the "Kapa o Pango" haka in honour of Diego Maradona, who had just died.

In 2022, "Kapa o Pango" was only performed once, which is the least in a season since its inception (the game was against South Africa on 6 August 2022 in Nelspruit).

In the test against Australia at the MCG on 29 July 2023, Australia captain Allan Alaalatoa presented a boomerang before the "Kapa o Pango" haka. Australia wore their First Nations jerseys for the match. After the haka, the All Blacks captain Ardie Savea accepted the gift and picked it up.

In a rare non-match "Kapa o Pango" haka, the All Blacks performed one at Caterpillar Valley Cemetery in honour of the fallen New Zealand soldiers there, before the start of the 2023 Rugby World Cup. They also placed a jersey in honour of a fallen All Black Stanley Black.

For the duration of the 2023 Rugby World Cup the leader held a hoe (canoe paddle), which according to Aaron Smith was something special for the group during their time in France that added to the performance of the haka. It was first displayed against France in the first game of the cup, in which the All Blacks lost. This was the first time France had beaten the All Blacks in a match which involved the "Kapa o Pango" haka.

On 15 September 2023, in a pool match of the Rugby World Cup 2023, the All Blacks performed "Kapa o Pango" versus Namibia, which was the first so-called tier 2 nation to witness it. In doing so Namibia became the tenth side to see it; New Zealand won the match 71–3.

On 5 October 2023, in a pool match of the Rugby World Cup 2023, the All Blacks performed "Kapa o Pango" against Uruguay. This made them the eleventh side to face it, however, Uruguay is unique in that they are the only team to not have Ka Mate performed before any match.

== Players who have led performances ==
For each New Zealand test match, one All Blacks player is assigned to lead the haka, kaea in Māori. Although the leader is often of Māori descent, this is not compulsory as two players, Keven Mealamu & Tana Umaga have Polynesian heritage.

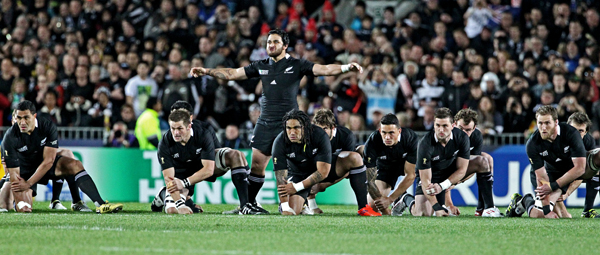
Piri Weepu leading "Kapa o Pango" in 2011

Since the introduction of "Kapa o Pango" in 2005, the following ten players have led the performance a total of 98 times:

- Piri Weepu (25)
- TJ Perenara (30)
- Aaron Smith (14)
- Liam Messam (12)
- Keven Mealamu (7)
- Rico Gear (3)
- Carl Hayman (2)
- Tana Umaga (2)
- Hosea Gear (1)
- Codie Taylor (2)

Numbers in brackets indicate how many times each player has led the "Kapa o Pango" haka. (correct as of 28 September 2024)

== Teams who have faced Kapa o Pango ==
Two sides Argentina and the British and Irish Lions are yet to beat the All Blacks in a "Kapa o Pango" test match while three sides Scotland, Namibia and Uruguay are yet to beat them in any of the test matches they have played. Uruguay are unique in that they are the only team to have faced "Kapa o Pango" and never Ka Mate.

In total eleven international rugby sides have faced "Kapa o Pango" before a test match:

- Australia (28, 4 wins, 2 draws)
- South Africa (26, 10 wins)
- England (10, 2 wins)
- Argentina (9)
- France (7, 2 wins)
- Wales (7, 1 win)
- Ireland (6, 3 wins)
- British & Irish Lions (2, 1 draw)
- Scotland (2)
- Namibia (1)
- Uruguay (1)

Numbers in brackets indicate how many times each team has faced "Kapa o Pango" as well as wins and draws for the opposition team.

On August 12, 2026 (NZT), The All Blacks faced a solo Kapa O Pango reply by Ma'a Nonu of The Sharks. He was a former All Black, in response to their performance of the Ka Mate haka.

== Controversy ==
"Kapa o Pango" concludes with a gesture which, according to Lardelli, represents "drawing vital energy into the heart and lungs". The gesture has been interpreted as a "throat slitting" gesture that has led to accusations that "Kapa o Pango" encourages violence and sends the wrong message to All Blacks fans.

The All Blacks opted not to perform "Kapa o Pango" in their opening test of 2006 against Ireland. It was requested that they perform their usual "Ka Mate" haka while a review was conducted into "Kapa o Pango". The action at the end of "Kapa o Pango" had drawn many complaints in the lead-up to the Irish test, with members of the public complaining about it to the NZRU. The NZRU said that it was not because of public pressure that it was not performed against Ireland.

In the run-up to the first All Blacks test of the 2006 Tri Nations at Jade Stadium in Christchurch against Australia, the NZRU completed their review, and concluded that the gesture had a radically different meaning within Māori culture and haka traditions, indicating the drawing of "hauora", the breath of life into the heart and lungs. As a result, "Kapa o Pango" was performed, complete with the final gesture, before the Australia test.

The controversial gesture was withdrawn in 2007, with a modified action (raking the right arm from the left hip to over the right shoulder) when "Kapa o Pango" was performed in test matches against France and South Africa.

During the 2008 Tri Nations series, the All Blacks appear to have reverted to the original action of drawing the hand across the throat.

The motion was again withdrawn when it was performed at the 2019 Rugby World Cup against South Africa and Ireland in Japan.

== Outside rugby ==
Part of "Kapa o Pango" is performed by the character Maui (voiced by Dwayne Johnson) in Walt Disney Animation Studios' 2016 film Moana.

== See also ==
- Haka in sports
- Ka Mate
