= 2016 Auckland mayoral election =

New Zealand mayoral election

- 8 October 2016
- Turnout: 37.89% (▲3.17 pp)
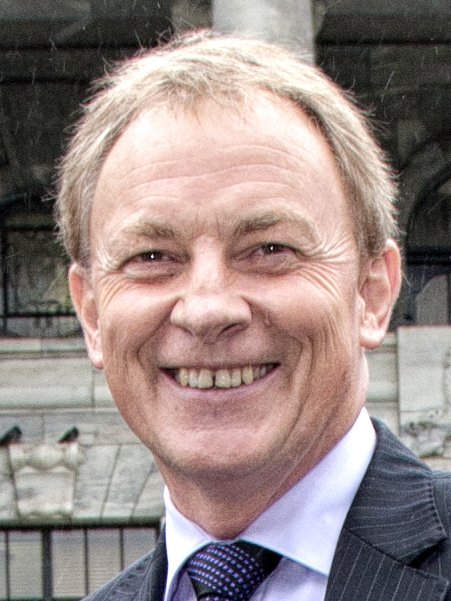

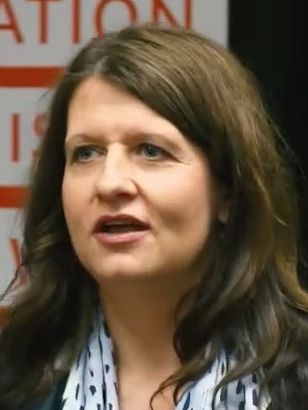

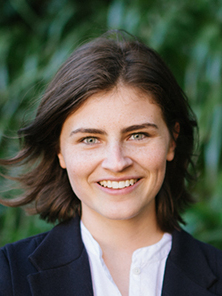

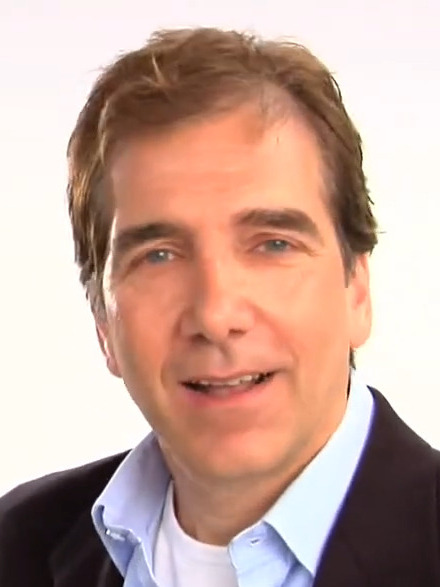
Candidate	Phil Goff	Victoria Crone
Party	Independent	Independent
Popular vote	187,622	111,731
Percentage	47.29%	28.16%
Candidate	Chlöe Swarbrick	John Palino
Party	Independent	Independent
Popular vote	29,098	22,387
Percentage	7.33%	5.64%
- Margin of victory in local boards
Mayor before election
Len Brown
Independent
Elected mayor
Phil Goff
Independent

An election was held for the Mayor of Auckland in September and October 2016, closing on 8 October, as part of the 2016 Auckland local government elections. Phil Goff was elected.

== Background ==
Len Brown, previously the Mayor of Manukau City, was elected to two three-year terms as Mayor of Auckland in 2010 and 2013, following the merger of several councils, including Manukau City Council, to form Auckland Council in 2010. He did not stand in 2016.

== Candidates ==
- Mario Alupis.
- Aileen Austin (Independent).
- Penny Bright (Independent), activist and 2013 mayoral candidate.
- Patrick Brown (Communist League).
- Tricia Cheel (STOP).
- Victoria Crone (Independent), New Zealand managing director of Xero; announced candidacy on 14 December 2015.
- Phil Goff (Independent), Labour MP for Mount Roskill; announced candidacy on 22 November 2015.
- David Hay (Independent), former Green parliamentary candidate for Rodney and Epsom and former policy analyst for Manukau City and Auckland Council; announced candidacy on 20 November 2015.
- Alezix Heneti.
- Adam Holland (Auckland Legalise Cannabis), perennial candidate
- Susanna Kruger
- Stan Martin (Independent).
- Bin Thanh Nguyen (Independent).
- Phil O'Conner (Christians Against Abortion).
- John Palino (Independent), entrepreneur and 2013 mayoral runner-up; confirmed candidacy on 29 February 2016.
- Tyrone Raumati (Greater Auckland), West Auckland based community leader.
- Chlöe Swarbrick (Independent), University of Auckland double graduate, journalist, and entrepreneur; announced candidacy on 4 July 2016.
- Mark Thomas (Independent), deputy chair of the Ōrākei Local Board; announced candidacy on 24 September 2015. During September he asked to withdraw from the race, conceding that it was "inevitable" that Phil Goff would win the election. Although he could not be removed from the ballot papers, Thomas refocused his campaign on Goff.
- Wayne Young.

=== Prospective candidates who did not stand ===
- Len Brown, incumbent mayor
- John Banks, former Mayor of Auckland City, former National MP for Whangarei, ACT MP for Epsom and 2010 mayoral candidate
- Michael Barnett, CEO of the Auckland Chamber of Commerce
- Stephen Berry (Affordable Auckland), second runner-up in 2013 mayoral election and ACT candidate for parliamentary electorate of Upper Harbour in 2014 general election; announced candidacy on 11 April 2015 for the mayor as well as council seat for the Albany ward. Withdrew from mayoral race on 21 March 2016 and endorsed John Palino.
- Cameron Brewer, Auckland councillor for the Ōrākei ward
- Colin Craig, founder and former leader of the Conservative Party
- Tex Edwards, co-founder of mobile telecommunications company 2degrees
- Theresa Gattung, former CEO of Telecom New Zealand
- Paul Henry, broadcaster
- Penny Hulse, incumbent deputy mayor of Auckland
- Maurice Williamson, National MP for Pakuranga

== Debates ==
A debate held on 15 February was attended by Goff, Crone, Bright, Thomas, Berry and Hay. Goff promoted the public-private partnership construction of a light rail network in Auckland, while Berry described the idea as fiscally irresponsible and out of date. Maria Slade of Stuff.co.nz opined the debate outcome as a victory for Goff.

Goff, Crone and Thomas participated in a 17 June debate, in which traffic congestion was discussed, and Goff lamented the late commitment to the City Rail Link as an example of poor investment in public infrastructure. A debate was scheduled for 8 September at the University of Auckland's School of Architecture and Planning, to be chaired by journalist Rod Oram.

== Opinion polling ==
Poll source	Date(s)	Sample size	Margin of error	Len Brown	Phil Goff	Victoria Crone	John Palino	Chlöe Swarbrick	Penny Bright	Mark Thomas	David Hay	Other	Don't know/won't vote
Horizon Research	19–26 March 2015	591	±4.1%	5%	20%	—	—	—	—	—	—	28%	—
The Spinoff/Survey Sampling International	17–19 August 2016	760	±3.6%	—N/a	31.2%	8.0%	7.9%	—	2.4%	1.7%	1.4%	2.9%	48.3%
Aera Foundation/Horizon Research	8–12 September 2016	748	±3.6%	—N/a	38%	11%	6%	5%	4%	4%	2%	8%	27%

== Results ==
2016 Auckland mayoral election
Party	Candidate	Votes	%	±%
Independent	Phil Goff	187,622	47.29	—
Independent	Victoria Crone	111,731	28.16	—
Independent	Chlöe Swarbrick	29,098	7.33	—
Independent	John Palino	22,387	5.64	−26.03
Independent	Mark Thomas	9,573	2.41	—
Independent	Penny Bright	7,022	1.77	−1.64
Independent	David Hay	2,845	0.72	—
Greater Auckland	Tyrone Raumati	2,387	0.60	—
Christians Against Abortion	Phil O'Connor	2,095	0.53	−0.35
STOP	Tricia Cheel	2,024	0.51	+0.14
Communist League	Patrick Brown	1,826	0.46	+0.21
None	Mario Alupis	1,800	0.45	—
Legalise Cannabis	Adam John Holland	1,772	0.45	—
Independent	Susanna Kruger	1,670	0.42	−0.21
None	Wayne Young	1,629	0.41	−0.62
Independent	Aileen Austin	1,577	0.40	—
Independent	Binh Thanh Nguyen	979	0.25	—
Independent	Stan Martin	836	0.21	—
Independent	Alezix Heneti	599	0.15	—
Majority		75,891	19.13	
Total valid votes		389,472	99.63	
Informal votes		1,427	0.37	−0.09
Turnout		390,899	37.89	+3.17
Registered electors		1,031,667		

=== By local board ===
Local boards and wards won by Goff
Local boards and wards won by Crone

		Phil Goff		Victoria Crone		Chlöe Swarbrick		John Palino		Others (Note: Excludes informal votes)		Total
Board	Ward	#	%	#	%	#	%	#	%	#	%	#
Albert–Eden	Albert–Eden–Roskill	14,650	51.94	6,387	24.24	3,640	12.91	1,123	3.98	2,403	8.52	28,203
Devonport–Takapuna	North Shore	7,447	39.59	7,581	40.31	1,338	7.11	981	5.22	1,461	7.77	18,808
Franklin	Franklin	7,576	38.83	7,329	37.56	1,751	8.97	913	4.68	1,942	9.95	19,511
Great Barrier	Waitematā and Gulf	213	47.02	64	14.13	71	15.67	27	5.96	78	17.22	453
Henderson–Massey	Waitākere	12,603	51.92	4,819	19.85	1,875	7.72	1,637	6.74	3,341	13.76	24,275
Hibiscus and Bays	Albany	11,045	36.79	12,534	41.75	1,848	6.16	1,924	6.41	2,669	8.89	30,020
Howick	Howick	17,052	44.75	12,511	32.84	1,867	4.90	3,042	7.98	3,630	9.53	38,102
Kaipātiki	North Shore	9,531	43.45	6,967	31.76	1,774	8.09	1,401	6.39	2,263	10.32	21,936
Māngere–Ōtāhuhu	Manukau	9,595	67.15	1,301	9.11	749	5.24	535	3.74	2,108	14.75	14,288
Manurewa	Manurewa–Papakura	8,806	57.97	2,138	14.08	763	5.02	1,120	7.37	2,363	15.56	15,190
Maungakiekie–Tāmaki	Maungakiekie–Tāmaki	9,072	53.33	3,808	22.38	1,368	8.04	818	4.81	1,946	11.44	17,012
Ōrākei	Ōrākei	11,054	36.93	13,329	44.52	2,058	6.87	1,281	4.28	2,214	7.40	29,936
Ōtara–Papatoetoe	Manukau	10,430	69.22	1,285	8.53	570	3.78	640	4.25	2,143	14.22	15,068
Papakura	Manurewa–Papakura	5,356	50.38	2,177	20.48	526	4.95	1,120	10.54	1,452	13.66	10,631
Puketāpapa	Albert–Eden–Roskill	11,591	69.89	2,629	15.85	922	5.56	544	3.28	898	5.41	16,584
Rodney	Rodney	6,803	35.32	7,924	41.14	1,323	6.87	1,112	5.77	2,099	10.90	19,261
Upper Harbour	Albany	5,078	36.88	5,555	40.34	891	6.47	1,056	7.67	1,189	8.64	13,769
Waiheke	Waitematā and Gulf	1,998	54.46	781	21.29	448	12.21	87	2.37	355	9.68	3,669
Waitākere Ranges	Waitākere	6,770	48.26	3,250	23.17	1,779	12.68	678	4.83	1,552	11.06	14,029
Waitematā	Waitematā and Gulf	9,385	46.87	5,858	29.25	3,014	15.05	538	2.69	1,230	6.14	20,025
Whau	Whau	11,567	61.85	3,054	16.33	1,361	7.28	911	4.87	1,809	9.67	18,702
Total		187,622	47.29	111,731	28.16	29,098	7.33	22,387	5.64	38,634	9.92	389,472

== See also ==
- 2016 Mount Roskill by-election
