= Hauraki (Māori electorate) =

Hauraki was a New Zealand parliamentary Māori electorate returning one Member of Parliament to the New Zealand House of Representatives. It existed for one parliamentary term from 1999 to 2002, and was held by John Tamihere. The electorate's area was formed from the northern portion of Te Tai Rawhiti as well as a small portion of Te Tai Hauāuru. Its area was expanded significantly westward to form the Tainui electorate for the 2002 election.

== History ==
Hauraki was the first Māori seat based exclusively around Auckland, and it was created at the time of the first review of Mixed Member Proportional (MMP) boundaries, ahead of the 1999 election. Hauraki was named after both the gulf at Auckland's eastern side, and Hauraki, a pan-tribal union based around an area including the Coromandel Peninsula, Thames Valley, and the Western Bay of Plenty. Hauraki's boundary stretched out of Auckland, down through the eastern Waikato to include Morrinsville and the Coromandel.

Population growth saw Māori electorates move north, and Hauraki was disestablished for the 2002 election. The area around Auckland now belongs to the Tāmaki Makaurau electorate, and the southern area went to the Tainui electorate.

Hauraki was also the name of a general electorate in use at various times between 1928 and 1996.

== Members of Parliament for Hauraki ==
Key

Labour Alliance

Election	Winner
1999 election	John Tamihere

=== List MPs ===
Members of Parliament elected from party lists in elections where that person also unsuccessfully contested the Hauraki electorate.

Election	Winner
1999 election	Willie Jackson

== Election results ==
=== 1999 election ===
1999 general election: Hauraki Māori
Notes:	Blue background denotes the winner of the electorate vote. Pink background denotes a candidate elected from their party list. Yellow background denotes an electorate win by a list member, or other incumbent. A ✓ or ✗ denotes status of any incumbent, win or lose respectively.						
Party	Candidate	Votes	%	±%	Party votes	%	±%
Labour	John Tamihere	9,532	60.30		8,986	56.07	
NZ First	Josie Marama Anderson	2,294	14.51		2,138	13.34	
Alliance	Willie Jackson	1,479	9.36		1,046	6.53	
National	George Tearoha Kahi	668	4.23		909	5.67	
Mauri Pacific	Amokura Panoho	471	2.98		401	2.50	
Te Tawharau	Rangi Mclean	468	2.96				
Mana Māori	Gareth Seymour	395	2.50		496	3.10	
Christian Heritage	Tuhi Vahaakolo	271	1.71		169	1.05	
Freedom Movement	Kororia Aperahama	143	0.90		51	0.32	
Natural Law	Selwyn Matia Austin	87	0.55		10	0.06	
Green					968	6.04	
Legalise Cannabis					532	3.32	
ACT					137	0.85	
Christian Democrats					82	0.51	
Animals First					37	0.23	
Libertarianz					16	0.10	
One NZ					13	0.08	
United NZ					12	0.07	
McGillicuddy Serious					9	0.06	
The People's Choice					6	0.04	
Republican					5	0.03	
NMP					1	0.01	
South Island					1	0.01	
Total valid votes		15,808			16,025		
Informal votes		461			244		
Labour hold	Majority	7,238	45.79				
