= John Tamihere =

New Zealand politician (born 1959)

The Honourable John Tamihere
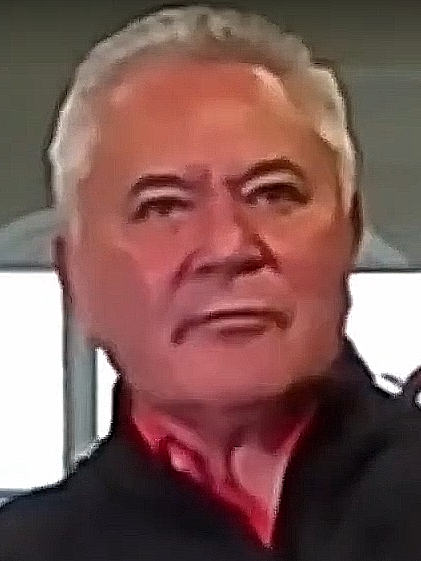
- Tamihere in 2023

6th President of the Māori Party
- Incumbent
- Assumed office 8 June 2022
- Preceded by: Che Wilson

5th Co-leader of the Māori Party
- In office 15 April 2020 – 28 October 2020 Co-leading with Debbie Ngarewa-Packer
- Preceded by: Te Ururoa Flavell
- Succeeded by: Rawiri Waititi

Member of the New Zealand Parliament for Tāmaki Makaurau
- In office 27 July 2002 – 17 September 2005
- Preceded by: Electorate created
- Succeeded by: Pita Sharples
- Majority: 9,444 (60.52%)

Member of the New Zealand Parliament for Hauraki
- In office 27 November 1999 – 27 July 2002
- Preceded by: Electorate created
- Succeeded by: Electorate abolished
- Majority: 7,238 (14.51%)

Personal details
- Born: 8 February 1959 (age 67) Auckland, New Zealand
- Party: Te Pāti Māori (since 2020); Labour (until 2019)
- Occupation: Lawyer

John Henry Tamihere (born 8 February 1959) is a New Zealand politician, media personality, and political commentator. He was a member of Parliament from 1999 to 2005, including serving as a Cabinet minister in the Labour Party from August 2002 to November 2004. Tamihere ran unsuccessfully for Auckland mayor in the 2019 election. He joined Te Pāti Māori (the Māori Party) in 2020 and from April to October 2020 was the party's co-leader. He became president of Te Pāti Māori in June 2022.

== Early life ==
Tamihere was born in Auckland on 8 February 1959, the 11th of 13 children of John Hamil Tamihere and Ruby Elaine Tamihere (née McEwen). Of Māori descent through his father, he affiliates to the Ngāti Porou ki Hauraki and Whakatohea iwi. His mother was from an Irish Catholic family, who ostracised her when she married his Māori father. He is a brother of David Tamihere.

John Tamihere attended St Mary's School in Avondale and St Peter's College where teacher Tom Weal, deputy leader of the Social Credit Political League 1970–1972, had a strong influence on him. Tamihere rated Weal as his most influential teacher, and said that Weal would link things to politics, in particular, to New Zealand's agricultural policies. Weal would emphasise that grass was the most important New Zealand crop, as it was the basis of the wool, meat, and dairy industries. Weal alerted Tamihere to the impact that Britain's joining the European Common market would have on New Zealand's economy and society. According to Weal, New Zealand would have to wake up quickly to the loss of the relationship with Britain, find new markets and new ways of doing things, and back itself. "The way Mr Weal brought education to life gave me a strong interest in what I call the Kiwi-isation of our society", wrote Tamihere.

Tamihere gained arts and law degrees from the University of Auckland, being the first person in his family to attend university. After graduating, he became a lawyer, eventually working for the Māori Land Court and the Department of Māori Affairs. In 1991, Tamihere became the chief executive of the Waipareira Trust, a trust that provides health and education services to Māori in the Auckland region. He also served as chairman of the New Zealand Māori Rugby League Board. Tamihere had a relatively high-profile before entering politics, having been selected as Person of the Year by The Sunday Star-Times, New Zealander of the Year by North & South magazine, and Man of the Year by Metro magazine.

== Member of Parliament ==
New Zealand Parliament
Years	Term	Electorate	List	Party
1999–2002	46th	Hauraki	none	Labour
2002–2005	47th	Tāmaki Makaurau	none	Labour

=== Election and roles ===
In the 1999 election, Tamihere stood as the Labour Party's candidate for the Māori electorate of Hauraki. He won the seat with 60 percent of the vote; his nearest rival gained only 15 percent. He became chairman of the Māori Affairs Select Committee and also served on the Finance and Expenditure Select Committee.

In the 2002 election, Tamihere contested the newly formed Tāmaki Makaurau electorate, which he won with 73 percent of the vote. He gained the second-highest majority in a Māori electorate, exceeded only by that of Parekura Horomia, the Minister of Māori Affairs. Tamihere was appointed to Cabinet in 2002. He served as Minister of Small Business, Minister of Youth Affairs, Minister of Statistics, and Minister for Land Information, as well as functioning as Horomia's deputy as Associate Minister of Māori Affairs until 2004.

Journalist Vernon Small said that "in the mid-2000s Tamihere was seen as a rising star, and even a potential prime minister".

=== Foreshore and seabed controversy ===
The foreshore and seabed controversy of 2004–2005 put considerable strain on the Labour Party's Māori MPs, with many showing dissatisfaction with the party's policy. Two Labour MPs, Tariana Turia and Nanaia Mahuta, chose to vote against Labour's legislation, and Turia elected to leave the party. Tamihere, however, eventually voted in favour of the legislation, and defended it from its critics. Tamihere also criticised the new Māori Party established by Turia and her supporters, saying that it would ultimately fail. According to Tamihere, the party's leaders belonged "to a relatively wealthy, educated elite", and did not represent ordinary Maori.

=== Resignation from Ministerial roles ===
In October 2004, Tamihere was accused of dishonest financial dealings, including accepting a "golden handshake" from the Waipareira Trust after stating that he would not take one, and failing to pay tax on this payment. On 15 October 2004, Tamihere requested leave from his Ministerial portfolios; he said that he had "done nothing to bring shame", but portrayed standing down from his Ministerial roles during the investigation as the "honourable" course. On 22 October, the Waipareira Trust accepted that it, not Tamihere, had the responsibility for tax on any payment, but other allegations relating to the financial management of the Trust persisted. On 3 November Tamihere resigned from his Ministerial portfolios, citing as untenable the retention of his responsibilities during on-going investigations. On 21 December, an official investigation cleared Tamihere of the tax charges, and on 14 March 2005, the Serious Fraud Office cleared him of the charges relating to his stewardship of the Waipareira Trust.

=== Other political controversies while in office ===
On 4 April 2005, the magazine Investigate published an interview in which Tamihere insulted the Prime Minister and Cabinet ministers. About Prime Minister Helen Clark he said, "But she's no good with emotions. She goes to pieces. She'll fold on the emotional side and walk away or not turn up. She knows it's going to get emotional and it upsets her. We've never had a great relationship". Tamihere also made comments regarded as derogatory about other members of the Labour Party: Steve Maharey was called "smarmy" and lacking in substance, and Michael Cullen was depicted as cunning and manipulative. Women were referred to as "front-bums" and the party's homosexual MPs were also criticised.

Tamihere denies that the interview he gave was on the record, a claim disputed by the journalist in question. Helen Clark speculated on Tamihere's having had a "liquid lunch", and indicated that a return to cabinet for Tamihere was no longer certain. Tamihere was advised to take leave to consider his position, and began attempting to mend relations with his colleagues.

A week later, however, more comments emerged from the interview. Tamihere was reported as being highly critical of women leaders, saying that they achieved their position through preferential treatment. He also stated that he was "sick and tired of hearing how many Jews got gassed" in the Holocaust, saying that while he found the Holocaust revolting, he believed that repeated mention of it was simply used to make people "feel guilty". He also alleged that Clayton Cosgrove, previously believed to be one of Tamihere's closest allies in the party, had conducted a "nasty" campaign of telephone harassment against Clark and her husband when Clark deposed Mike Moore as party leader in 1993. These latest revelations were regarded by many as the end of Tamihere's career within the Labour Party, and Clark indicated that she saw no chance of Tamihere being elected to Cabinet again. The revelation of these comments also ended talk of a potential move to another party, the National Party being frequently mentioned, and also ended attempts by opposition parties in New Zealand to portray Tamihere as a victim of the Labour Party and to use the comments to point out the flaws within the Labour Party. At the Labour Party caucus meeting on 12 April, Tamihere attended despite being placed on stress leave by Clark. He apologised for his comments and was censured by the meeting, but was not asked to resign from the party.

=== Loss of seat ===
In the 2005 election, Tamihere lost his electorate seat to Pita Sharples of the Māori Party and left Parliament. He had previously decided not to seek a list placement, stating that this decision was due to his desire to determine whether he had the "people's mandate."

== Career after Parliament ==
=== Return to Waipareira Trust ===
After his election loss, Tamihere sought re-election to the Waipareira Trust. He was voted back onto the board by members of the trust, but the board itself tried to remove him by changing the governance rules. This resulted in a legal case which Tamihere and the four other newly elected board members won. As of 2020 Tamihere is still chief executive of the trust.

In late September 2022, Charities Services general manager Natasha Weight confirmed that the agency was investigating two charities headed by Tamihere, the Waipareira Trust and the National Urban Māori Authority, for financing his 2019 Auckland mayoral and 2020 general election campaigns. Under existing legislation, charities are banned from donating or endorsing political parties or candidates and allowing them to use their resources. According to the Charities Register, Te Whānau o Waipareira Trust Group had provided NZ$385,307 in interest free loans to support Tamihere's 2020 election campaign while the National Urban Māori Authority had paid NZ$70,833 to support his 2019 Auckland mayoral campaign and NZ$82,695 payment to support his 2020 election campaign and Māori Party aspirations. In response, Tamihere accused the Charities Services of discriminating against Māori causes and the Māori Party. Tamihere and the Māori Party also confirmed that they would litigate against the Charities Service if the agency ruled against them. In addition, Tamihere criticised The New Zealand Herald journalist Matt Nippert's coverage of the two charities' donations to his election campaigns, which he described as racist. He announced that the Māori Party would be boycotting The Herald.

In May 2023, the Waipareira Trust agreed to cease making political donations and recover funds it had made in interest free loans to its chief executive and Te Pāti Māori (formerly the Māori Party) President Tamihere. By February 2024, Tamihere had repaid his loan to the Waipareira Trust. This loan had been used to fund his political campaigns. The Charities Service confirmed that it was still continuing its investigation into the Waipareira Trust's political donations.

In July 2024, the Charities Service concluded its four-year investigation into the Waipareira Trust's donations into Tamihere's political campaigns and referred the case to the peak charities regulator, the Charities Registration Board.

=== Radio career and the "Roast Busters" controversy ===
Tamihere previously co-hosted a talkback show, Willie & JT, on Radio Live with Willie Jackson. He is well known for his trenchant political commentaries on television, radio and through other media. Tamihere and Jackson also have a New Zealand current affairs debate-based TV show, "The world according to Willie and JT". In 2007, Tamihere and Jackson ran for the mayoralties in Waitakere City and Manukau City respectively. Both were unsuccessful, Tamihere finishing second behind the incumbent, Bob Harvey. From 2011 to 2012, he hosted the TV3 show Think Tank that dealt with issues affecting New Zealanders and particularly those of importance to Maori.

In November 2013, on RadioLive, Willie Jackson and John Tamihere interviewed a 'friend' of an alleged rape victim, "Amy". Amy discussed information she knew about an incident by a group called the "Roast Busters" that was under investigation in New Zealand. Jackson and Tamihere asked her why and how much the girls had been drinking, and why they were out late at night. "The other side comes to it, were they willing drinkers?" They also questioned why the girls, some as young as 13, had not made formal complaints to the police, asked "how free and easy are you kids these days?", and asked Amy what age she had lost her virginity. They also described the Roast Busters' actions as "mischief". Jackson and Tamihere also implied that some young girls who had consensual sex with the young men may now "line up and say they were raped as well". Amy said she believed those involved were rapists, which was met with a small laugh by the hosts, who then said: "Well if some of the girls have consented that doesn't make them rapists, right?" Many on social media were angry with the pair, calling for them to be fired or to step down from their positions. Vodafone, Telecom, Countdown and Briscoes suspended all RadioLive advertising due to the interview. Four other advertisers pulled their campaigns from the station earlier.

On 11 November, the pair stood down from their show for the rest of the year. Jackson returned in early 2014 with new co-host Alison Mau, replacing Tamihere, who did not return. This resulted in Tamihere launching legal action against Mediaworks alleging breach of his contract. Mediaworks eventually settled and apologised.

== Return to politics ==
=== 2014 general election ===
In October 2012, Tamihere made moves to resume his parliamentary career by indicating that he would like to stand again for the Labour Party in the 2014 election, but his name was not on Labour's list. On 17 November 2012, Tamihere was barred from the Labour Party Annual Conference after criticising the party for being "too focused on issues like gay marriage".

=== Local government ===
In the 2013 New Zealand local elections, Tamihere stood successfully for a seat on the board of the Waitakere Licensing Trust, which owns and operates a chain of wholesale liquor outlets and bars in West Auckland. He also stood, but narrowly missed out, for a seat on the Waitemata District Health Board, which also covers the North Shore and Rodney areas. Tamihere said that he did "very well in West Auckland but just could not carry the North Shore votes." He said that he did no campaigning for either post, such as attending public meetings, putting up placards or handing out pamphlets, preferring to "just put my name on the ballot to see what happens". Tamihere did not seek election to any local government positions in 2016.

Tamihere ran unsuccessfully for Auckland mayor in the 2019 election. Tamihere came second, with 22% of the vote. He used the term "Sieg Heil" during a debate. After Goff stated "We won't put up with the sort of nonsense that we get from racists coming into this country to tell us that multiculturalism doesn't work," Tamihere responded, "I say sieg heil to that." After the debate, Tamihere initially denied using the term, then stated his comments were a criticism of Goff's decision to bar Canadian visitors Stefan Molyneux and Lauren Southern from using an Auckland Council venue for an event in 2018, calling Goff "a dictator". Also during the campaign, Tamihere made a complaint over three social media posts posted by Phil Goff, but the complaints were rejected by the Advertising Standards Authority.

=== 2020 general election ===
In 2020, Tamihere joined the Māori Party, and in April 2020 he was announced as the party's co-leader along with Debbie Ngarewa-Packer. Tamihere was the Māori Party's candidate for the electorate of Tāmaki Makaurau and was seventh on the party list.

Tamihere said he would vote yes in the 2020 New Zealand cannabis referendum that was held alongside the 2020 general election, but would rather cannabis was only decriminalised rather than legalised. He narrowly failed to unseat incumbent Labour MP for Tamaki Makaurau Peeni Henare and did not enter Parliament. His son-in-law Rawiri Waititi won Waiariki and, as the only Maori Party MP who successfully contested an electorate in 2020, automatically replaced him as male co-leader of the party.

=== President of Te Pāti Māori ===
On 8 June 2022, Tamihere succeeded Che Wilson as president of the Māori Party (Te Pāti Māori).

=== 2023 general election ===
During the 2023 New Zealand general election, Tamihere contested the Te Atatū electorate for the Māori Party, which had renamed itself Te Pāti Māori. He came fifth place, with Labour's Phil Twyford winning the electorate. Though Tamihere was not elected into Parliament, the Māori Party won six of the seven Māori electorates.

In early June 2024, Stuff journalist Andrea Vance published two reports alleging that staff at the Manurewa Marea in the Tāmaki Makaurau electorate had illegally collected personal data obtained during the 2023 New Zealand census collection and COVID-19 immunisation drives for political campaigning purposes by Te Pāti Māori during the 2023 general election. Former marae workers also alleged that Census participants were given vouchers and gifts to encourage them to switch to the Māori roll. Manurewa Marae CEO Takutai Tarsh Kemp had successfully contested Tāmaki Makaurau as a Te Pāti Māori candidate during the 2023 election. In addition, the Labour Party complained that Tamihere's Waipareira Trust used a text code to encourage COVID-19 vaccine recipients to vote for Te Pāti Māori during the 2023 election. Statistics New Zealand launched an investigation into the alleged data breaches.

In response, Tamihere claimed that the census data misuse allegations were made by disgruntled former marae employees. Following second allegations, Tamihere denounced the allegations as baseless and claimed that the party was being targeted by opponents for speaking up for Māori. Tamihere also accused Destiny Church leader Brian Tamaki of attempting to take over Manurewa Marae. Former Māori academic Rawiri Taonui has disputed the allegations against Waipareira Trust, Te Pāti Māori and Manurewa Marae; arguing that photocopies of census data were taken solely for verification purposes and destroyed, highlighting that Statistics New Zealand had clarified that neither Tamihera, the Waipareira Trust and the Whanau Ora Commissioning Agency had access to their database, disputing that vouchers were used to encourage people to switch to the Māori electoral roll, and denying that Māori Party flyers were included in wellbeing packs. Taonui also claimed that the whistleblowers were connected to Destiny Church and had instigated the allegations against Manurewa Marae and Te Pāti Māori following a failed attempt by the church to take over the marae.

On 22 January 2025, a Statistics New Zealand investigation cleared the Whanau Ora Commissioning Agency of data breaches during the 2023 Census, finding that the agency increased Māori participation. The report made nine recommendations to improve Statistics NZ's procedures and referred allegations against Manurewa Marae to the Privacy Commissioner. The report also found no evidence that one of the alleged whistleblowers had attempted to contact Statistics NZ regarding allegations against the marae.

On 2 October 2025, the Police and Serious Fraud Office (SFO) halted their investigation into the Manurewa Marae electoral misconduct allegations after they found insufficient evidence of corruption. The SFO and Privacy Commissioner are still investigating potential privacy breaches at the time.

==== 2025 internal conflict ====
In March 2025, Tamihere faced calls to resign as the president of Te Pāti Māori in order to give the Whānau Ora Commissioning Agency a greater sense of political neutrality. The Government had announced plans to change Whānau Ora providers following an investigation into the Whānau Ora Commissioning Agency for allegedly using public funds for electioneering. Tamihere rejected calls to resign as the party's leader while also heading the Whānau Ora Commissioning Agency. On 24 March 2025, the party's deputy president Eru Kapa-Kingi resigned from his position following the Whānau Ora funding changes announcement and an unsuccessful motion to remove Tamihere as party president.

On 1 August 2025, Tamihere was informed that Mariameno Kapa-Kingi, the party's MP for Te Tai Tokerau, had drawn the attention of Parliamentary Services over allegations that she had exceeded her parliamentary budget of NZ$133,000 over contractual services to her son, Eru Kapa-Kingi. The following day, Tamihere contacted Kapa-Kingi to raise Te Pāti Māori's concerns that her financial mismanagement could affect the party's public image. On 11 September, Kapa-Kingi was stripped of her position as whip, with Tamihere alleging that she had become detached from her constituents. On 16 September, Tamihere defended racially charged remarks by Tākuta Ferris, the party's MP for Te Tai Tonga, objecting to the presence of non-Māori Labour Party volunteers canvassing during the 2025 Tāmaki Makaurau by-election. In response, Labour leader Chris Hipkins expressed disagreement with Ferris's remarks, warning that it could affect Te Pāti Māori's relationship with the Labour Party.

In early October 2025, Eru announced that the Toitū Te Tiriti protest movement would be severing ties with Te Pāti Māori, accusing the party's leadership of alleged "bullying" and "dictatorial behaviour." During an interview with Waatea News on 13 October, Tamihere described the Kapa-Kingi allegations as a "separate family issue" and said the party would take a "tikanga-based solution" to resolving the dispute. Later that night, Te Pāti Māori released a series of emails documenting several allegations against Mariameno and Eru Kapa-Kingi including financial mismanagement, bullying and intimidation. These emails were leaked to the New Zealand media and attracted significant coverage. Following the email's release, Ferris called for a vote of no confidence in Tamihere's presidency and the party's national board. On 31 October, former Te Pāti Māti executive member Amokura Panoho called on Tamihere to resign as party leader and for the party to return to its "collective kaupapa."

On 3 November 2025, Tamihere called on dissenting TPM MPs Kapa-Kingi and Ferris to resign, accusing the duo of "greed, avarice, and entitlement" and attempting to overthrow the party's co-leaders Rawiri Waititi and Debbie Ngarewa-Packer. On 9 November, the party's national council, consisting of electorate representatives from several Māori electorates except Te Tai Tokerau and Te Tai Tonga, voted to expel Kapa-Kingi and Ferris, alleging they had committed serious breaches of the party's constitution. In response, Kapa-Kingi and Ferris denounced their expulsions as unconstitutional and vowed to contest it. Following an interim injunction filed by Kapa-Kingi at the Wellington High Court challenging her expulsion, Justice Paul Radich reinstated Kapa-Kingi's membership of the party on 5 December. However, he declined Kapa-Kingi's request to remove Tamihere as the party's president, cancel the party's upcoming annual general meeting and to block the party's leadership hierarchy from passing further resolutions.

During TPM's AGM held on 7 December in Rotorua, Tamihere gave a speech describing the National-led coalition government as the party's enemy. During the proceedings, the former Kiingitanga spokesperson Ngira Simmonds raised the issue of infighting and challenged Tamihere, Waititi and Ngarewa-Packer's suitability to lead the party.

== Views and opinions ==
Tamihere has a high public profile, much of it derived from his beliefs on a number of issues. He has made a significant impact in Māori politics by campaigning on behalf of "Urban Māori", who often have no remaining links to their iwi or hapū (tribe or sub-tribal grouping). According to Tamihere, traditional structures such as iwi do not reflect the reality of modern Māori life, and have proven inadequate for solving today's problems. Tamihere has condemned modern iwi organisations as "new feudal tribal constructs", dominated by an elite group far removed from the majority of Maori. These comments have angered many prominent Māori leaders, but won him considerable popularity with ordinary Māori voters, as well as with a large measure of non-Māori supporters.

Tamihere has also attracted both criticism and praise for his views on Māori self-sufficiency. According to Tamihere, too many Māori "blam[e] others for our failure", and Māori need to "take responsibility for our own actions". This has placed him at odds with Māori politicians such as Willie Jackson, who accuse Tamihere of "victim-blaming". Tamihere, however, claims that the "victim mentality" holds Māori back, and that Māori need to abandon it if they wish to improve their living standards.

Tamihere has expressed concern that the National-led coalition government's boot camp programme would fail without long-term support. He said "the kids loved it because it wasn't about a boot camp. It was about the discipline of working out how discipline works within a structured environment these kids had never been part of. You've got to watch because as soon as they come out of that you've got to put them on a staircase. Unless you are micromanaging that staircase all the way through they fall off and they fall deeper."

== Other controversies ==
Tamihere was convicted for three drink driving and other driving offences between 1978 and 1995, according to the National Business Review.

In May 2005, Tamihere was cautioned by the New Zealand SPCA after he left two cats when he moved house. Neighbours said the cats had been left without food or water for eleven days and the New Zealand Herald reported that the two cats were discovered with feline immunodeficiency virus.

In April 2013, Tamihere made headlines when he removed a wheel clamp himself.

In April 2020, two doctors walked off the job at a COVID-19 testing clinic in West Auckland, after claims Tamihere told his staff to lie in order to meet the criteria to get tested for COVID-19. The clinic is operated by the Waipareira Trust, for which Tamihere is the chief executive. Tamihere refused an interview request and said it was an employment matter.

== See also ==
- List of alumni of St Peter's College, Auckland

New Zealand Parliament
New constituency	Member of Parliament for Hauraki; 1999–2002	Constituency abolished
New constituency	Member of Parliament for Tāmaki Makaurau; 2002–2005	Succeeded by Pita Sharples
Political offices
Preceded by Matt Robson	Minister for Land Information; 2002–2004	Succeeded by Paul Swain
Party political offices
Vacant Title last held by Te Ururoa Flavell	Co-leader of the Māori Party; 2020; Served alongside: Debbie Ngarewa-Packer	Succeeded by Rawiri Waititi
