= 2013 Auckland mayoral election =

New Zealand mayoral election

- 12 October 2013
- Registered: 995,206
- Turnout: 345,509 (34.72%)
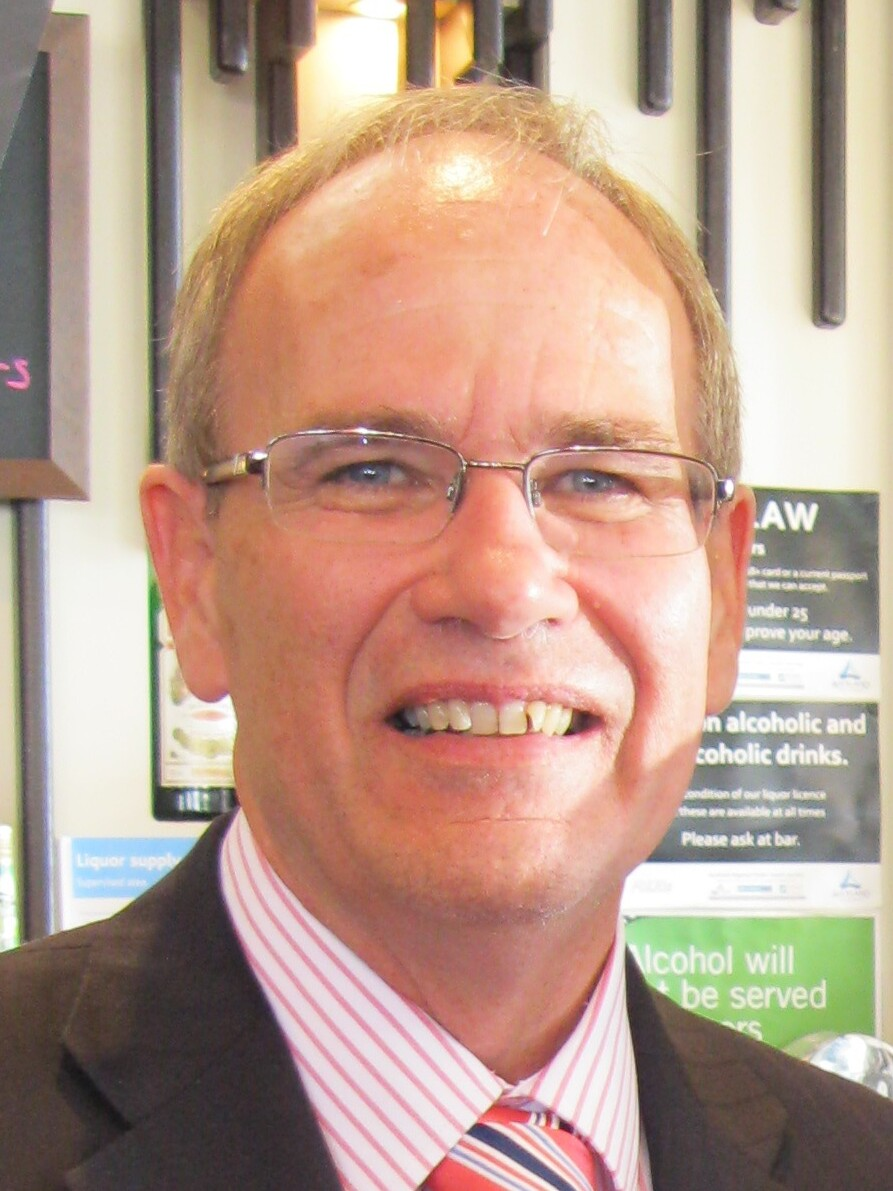

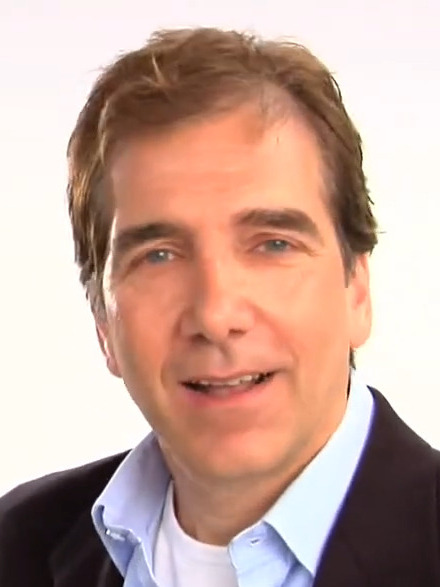
| Candidate | Len Brown | John Palino |
| Party | Independent | Independent |
| Popular vote | 164,338 | 108,928 |
| Percentage | 47.78% | 31.67% |
- Margin of victory in local boards
Mayor before election
Len Brown
Elected mayor
Len Brown

An election was held for the office of Mayor of Auckland on 12 October 2013. It was one of many triennial local elections that took place in Auckland and throughout New Zealand at the time.

== Background ==
Incumbent Len Brown appeared at number seven by the City Mayors Foundation's 2012 World Mayor list.

== Candidates ==
- Len Brown (independent), incumbent mayor
- John Palino (independent), restaurant manager and former host of television show The Kitchen Job
- John Minto (Mana Movement), activist
- Penny Bright (independent), activist
- Uesifili Unasa (independent), Christian minister
- David Willmott (Roads First), stood for mayor in 2010
- Stephen Berry (Affordable Auckland), also candidate for the Waitematā and Gulf ward
- Jesse Butler
- Paul Duffy
- Susanna Kruger (independent)
- Matthew Goode
- Annalucia Vermunt (Communist League)
- Emmett Hussey
- Phil O'Connor (Christians Against Abortion)
- Wayne Young, homeless man and protester, stood for mayor in 2010
- Reuben Shadbolt, son of Invercargill mayor Tim Shadbolt
- Julia Parfitt, chair of Hibiscus and Bays local board

=== Prospective candidates who did not stand ===
- Maurice Williamson (National), MP for Pakuranga
- Cameron Brewer (independent), councillor for the Orākei ward

== Campaign ==
Brown's priority for the city was the funding and commencement of the City Rail Link, which had 63% public support in June 2009.

Palino ran on a conservative policy platform, and his campaign was managed by Communities and Residents president and former National Party president John Slater. He opposed the urban intensification of some Auckland communities, including those on the North Shore, instead proposing a second central business district model based in Manukau.

Postal ballots were sent to voters from 20 September.

== Opinion polling ==
– Some polls were taken after voting began on 20 September.

| Poll source | Date(s) | Sample size | Margin of error | Len Brown | John Palino | John Minto | Uesifili Unasa | Other | None of these/Unsure/Refused |
|---|---|---|---|---|---|---|---|---|---|
| Horizon Research | 13–21 June 2013 | 1,106 | ±2.8% | 36.7% | 6.8% | 6.7% | — | 41.1% | 8.7% |
| Horizon Research | 13–21 June 2013 | 1,106 | ±2.9% | 57.4% | 42.6% | — | — | — | — |
| UMR Research | 19 August 2013 | 500 | ±4.4% | 47% | 14% | 5% | 1% | 4% | 29% |
| Horizon Research | 2 October 2013 | 1072 | ±2.9% | 38.2% | 24.1% | 2.8% | 1.3% | 10.0% | 23.6% |
| Herald on Sunday–Key Research | 6 October 2013 | 514 | ±4.9% | 66% | 21% | 2% | 1% | 9% | — |
| Horizon Research | 9 October 2013 | 1162 | ±2.8% | 38.5% | 24.4% | 3.5% | 1.4% | 9.8% | 22.6% |

== Results ==
2013 Auckland mayoral election
| Party | Candidate | Votes | % | ±% |
|---|---|---|---|---|
| Independent | Len Brown | 164,338 | 47.78 | −1.46 |
| Independent | John Palino | 108,928 | 31.67 | — |
| Affordable Auckland | Stephen Berry | 13,650 | 3.97 | — |
| Independent | Penny Bright | 11,723 | 3.41 | +2.85 |
| Mana | John Minto | 11,591 | 3.37 | — |
| Independent | Uesifili Unasa | 8,040 | 2.34 | — |
| Working for the Homeless | Wayne Young | 3,943 | 1.15 | +1.03 |
| Independent | Reuben Shadbolt | 3,152 | 0.92 | — |
| Independent | Paul Duffy | 3,083 | 0.90 | — |
| Christians Against Abortion | Phil O'Connor | 3,032 | 0.88 | +0.61 |
| Independent | Emmett Hussey | 2,974 | 0.86 | — |
| Independent | Susanna Susara Kruger | 2,173 | 0.63 | — |
| Independent | Matthew Goode | 2,116 | 0.62 | — |
| Roads First | David Willmott | 1,647 | 0.48 | +0.37 |
| Independent | Jesse Butler | 1,465 | 0.43 | — |
| Independent | Tricia Cheel | 1,214 | 0.35 | — |
| Communist League | Annalucia Vermunt | 856 | 0.25 | +0.16 |
| Majority | | 55,410 | 16.11 | +2.44 |
| Total valid votes | | 343,925 | 99.54 | |
| Informal votes | | 1,584 | 0.46 | |
| Turnout | | 345,509 | 34.72 | −15.45 |
| Registered electors | | 995,206 | | |

=== By local board ===
Local boards and wards won by Brown
Local boards and wards won by Palino

| | | Len Brown | | John Palino | | Stephen Berry | | Penny Bright | | John Minto | | Others (Note: Excludes informal votes) | | Total |
| Board | Ward | # | % | # | % | # | % | # | % | # | % | # | % | # |
|---|---|---|---|---|---|---|---|---|---|---|---|---|---|---|
| Albert–Eden | Albert–Eden–Roskill | 12,114 | 51.98 | 6,574 | 28.21 | 637 | 2.73 | 741 | 3.18 | 1,335 | 5.73 | 1,904 | 8.17 | 23,305 |
| Devonport–Takapuna | North Shore | 6,418 | 38.10 | 7,620 | 45.23 | 584 | 3.47 | 508 | 3.02 | 456 | 2.71 | 1,260 | 7.48 | 16,846 |
| Franklin | Franklin | 7,364 | 44.24 | 6,310 | 37.91 | 734 | 4.41 | 716 | 4.30 | 328 | 1.97 | 1,194 | 7.17 | 16,646 |
| Great Barrier | Waitematā and Gulf | 222 | 50.23 | 80 | 18.10 | 33 | 7.47 | 19 | 4.30 | 39 | 8.82 | 49 | 11.09 | 442 |
| Henderson–Massey | Waitākere | 10,309 | 45.26 | 6,168 | 27.08 | 1,154 | 5.07 | 991 | 4.35 | 906 | 3.98 | 3,250 | 14.27 | 22,778 |
| Hibiscus and Bays | Albany | 8,306 | 32.85 | 11,760 | 46.51 | 1,180 | 4.67 | 1,182 | 4.68 | 563 | 2.23 | 2,292 | 9.07 | 25,283 |
| Howick | Howick | 16,549 | 48.97 | 11,790 | 34.89 | 1,284 | 3.80 | 1,027 | 3.04 | 485 | 1.44 | 2,555 | 7.58 | 33,690 |
| Kaipātiki | North Shore | 7,673 | 38.94 | 7,609 | 38.61 | 1,081 | 5.49 | 727 | 3.69 | 658 | 3.34 | 1,959 | 9.94 | 19,707 |
| Māngere–Ōtāhuhu | Manukau | 9,369 | 66.55 | 1,155 | 8.20 | 399 | 2.83 | 269 | 1.91 | 721 | 5.12 | 2,166 | 15.38 | 14,079 |
| Manurewa | Manurewa–Papakura | 9,949 | 63.87 | 2,671 | 17.15 | 526 | 3.38 | 364 | 2.34 | 529 | 3.40 | 1,534 | 9.85 | 15,573 |
| Maungakiekie–Tāmaki | Maungakiekie–Tāmaki | 8,616 | 52.20 | 4,018 | 24.34 | 655 | 3.97 | 557 | 3.37 | 615 | 3.73 | 2,045 | 12.39 | 16,506 |
| Orākei | Orākei | 9,682 | 38.69 | 12,041 | 48.11 | 656 | 2.62 | 488 | 1.95 | 434 | 1.73 | 1,725 | 6.89 | 25,026 |
| Ōtara–Papatoetoe | Manukau | 10,285 | 68.24 | 1,539 | 10.21 | 464 | 3.08 | 310 | 2.06 | 568 | 3.77 | 1,906 | 12.65 | 15,072 |
| Papakura | Manurewa–Papakura | 5,476 | 54.08 | 2,762 | 27.28 | 356 | 3.52 | 342 | 3.38 | 302 | 2.98 | 887 | 8.76 | 10,125 |
| Puketāpapa | Albert–Eden–Roskill | 6,957 | 51.98 | 3,385 | 25.29 | 640 | 4.78 | 471 | 3.52 | 467 | 3.48 | 1,464 | 10.94 | 13,384 |
| Rodney | Rodney | 5,119 | 34.65 | 6,110 | 41.35 | 818 | 5.54 | 753 | 5.10 | 498 | 3.37 | 1,477 | 10.17 | 14,775 |
| Upper Harbour | Albany | 3,869 | 33.07 | 5,308 | 45.37 | 688 | 5.88 | 462 | 3.95 | 241 | 2.06 | 1,131 | 9.67 | 11,699 |
| Waiheke | Waitematā and Gulf | 2,098 | 59.00 | 677 | 19.04 | 108 | 3.04 | 154 | 4.33 | 234 | 6.58 | 285 | 8.01 | 3,556 |
| Waitākere Ranges | Waitākere | 6,179 | 49.95 | 3,239 | 26.18 | 517 | 4.18 | 545 | 4.41 | 629 | 5.08 | 1,261 | 10.19 | 12,370 |
| Waitematā | Waitematā and Gulf | 9,108 | 56.76 | 4,163 | 25.94 | 393 | 2.45 | 437 | 2.72 | 847 | 5.28 | 1,099 | 6.85 | 16,047 |
| Whau | Whau | 8,676 | 50.99 | 3,949 | 23.21 | 743 | 4.37 | 660 | 3.88 | 696 | 4.09 | 2,292 | 13.47 | 17,016 |
| Total | | 164,338 | 47.78 | 108,928 | 31.67 | 13,650 | 3.97 | 11,723 | 3.41 | 11,591 | 3.37 | 33,695 | 9.80 | 343,925 |
