= Des Morrison (politician) =

New Zealand politician

Des Morrison is a New Zealand politician who was an Auckland Councillor.

== Early years ==
Morrison was born in Hikurangi. He is of Ngāpuhi descent and attended Pukekohe High School.

== Political career ==
Auckland Council
Years	Ward	Affiliation
2010–2013	Franklin	Team Franklin C&R

Morrison was a Franklin District Councillor between 2004 and 2010.

In the 2010 Auckland Council elections, Morrison was elected as the member for the Franklin ward.

In 2012, he resigned from the renamed Communities and Residents, claiming that they were too urban-centric and he wanted to focus on rural issues before retiring in 2013.
