= Saint John's =

Saint John's or St. John's may refer to:

== Places ==
=== Antigua and Barbuda ===
- St. John's, Antigua and Barbuda, location of the Parliament of Antigua and Barbuda
- Saint John, Antigua and Barbuda, parish of which St. John's is a part

=== Australia ===
- St Johns, South Australia
- St Johns Wood, Queensland, a neighbourhood in Brisbane, Australia

=== Canada ===
- St. John's, Newfoundland and Labrador, the capital and largest city of the province
- St. Johns (electoral district), North Winnipeg, Manitoba
- Roman Catholic Archdiocese of St. John's, Newfoundland
- St. Johns, Ontario
- St. John's Island, British colony from 1763 to 1798, when it was renamed Prince Edward Island
- St. John's (electoral district), a federal riding in Quebec from 1867 to 1892
- St. Johns, now called Saint-Jean-sur-Richelieu, Quebec

=== Ireland ===
- St. Johns Point, County Donegal, a headland and lighthouse in County Donegal
- St. Johns, County Kildare, a civil parish in County Kildare
- St. Johns, County Roscommon, a civil parish in County Roscommon

=== New Zealand ===
- St Johns, New Zealand, a suburb of Auckland
- St Johns Bush, a reserve in Auckland

=== United Kingdom ===
- St John's, Crowborough, a village in Crowborough
- St Johns, London, a district of Lewisham
- St John's, Redhill, Surrey, a hamlet adjoining the town of Redhill
- St. John's, Surrey, England
- St John's, South Yorkshire, England
- St John's, Worcester, England
- St John's Ward, Ipswich, Suffolk
- St John's Chapel, County Durham
- St John's Lane, the home of Bristol City F.C. until 1904
- Saint John's Point, County Down, Northern Ireland, a cape at the end of the Lecale Peninsula
- St John's Rock, a 19th-century name for Dubh Artach, Scotland
- St John's Town of Dalry, Dumfries and Galloway, Scotland
- St John's Wood, a district of the city of Westminster

=== United States ===
- St. Johns, Arizona
- St. Johns, Maricopa County, Arizona
- St. John's River (California)
- St. Johns, Florida
- St. Johns County, Florida
- St. Johns River, Florida
- St. Johns, Illinois
- Saint Johns, Indiana
- St. Johns, Michigan
- Saint Johns, Ohio
- St. Johns, Portland, Oregon

=== Elsewhere ===
- St John's, Isle of Man
- St. Johns, Saba, a village on the Caribbean island of Saba, a special municipality of the Netherlands
- Saint John's Island, Singapore

== Education ==
- Saint John's College (disambiguation)
- Saint John's University (disambiguation)
- St. John's Preparatory School (disambiguation)
- St. John's School (disambiguation)
- St. John's Seminary (disambiguation)

== Other uses ==
- Saint John's Health Center, Santa Monica, California
- St. John's Mine, a cinnabar mine in Vallejo, California
- St. John's Red Storm, the athletic program of St. John's University in New York City
- St Johns railway station, in the southeast London borough of Lewisham
- Old St John's Buildings, historic site in Bournemouth, England
- Adela Rogers St. Johns (1894–1988), American writer
- HMCS St. John's (FFH 340), a Halifax-class frigate in the Canadian Navy
- Hypericum perforatum, St John's wort herb
- Leeds St Johns, a British rugby league football club today known as Leeds Rhinos
- Saint John's Arms, another name for the looped square (⌘)

== See also ==
- St. John's Cathedral (disambiguation)
- St. John's Church (disambiguation)
- St. Johns, Florida (disambiguation)
- St. John's Park (disambiguation)
- St. John's Regional Medical Center (disambiguation)
- Saint John's Eve
- Saints John, Colorado
- Saint John (disambiguation)
