= St. John's Seminary =

St. John's Seminary may refer to:

== India ==
- St. John's Regional Seminary in Ramanthapur, Hyderabad.
- St. John's Regional Seminary (Philosophate) in Kothavalasa, Vizianagaram District, Andhra Pradesh

== Ireland ==
- St. John's College, Waterford

== United Kingdom ==
- St. John's Seminary (Wonersh), Wonersh, Guildford, Surrey, England

== United States ==
- St. John's Seminary (California), Camarillo, California
- Saint John's Seminary (Massachusetts), Brighton, Boston, Massachusetts
- St. John's School of Theology-Seminary, College of Saint Benedict and Saint John's University in Collegeville, Minnesota
- St. John's College Seminary, an institution at what is now Fordham University
- Saint John Vianney Seminary (Minnesota), a college seminary in Saint Paul, Minnesota
- Saint John Vianney Seminary (Denver), a theological seminary in Denver, Colorado
- Saint John Vianney Seminary (Miami), a college seminary in Miami, Florida

== See also ==
- Saint John's College (disambiguation)
- Saint John's University (disambiguation)
- St. John's School (disambiguation)
- Saint John's (disambiguation)
