= SJH =

SJH may refer to:

== Hospitals ==
- Safdarjung Hospital, New Delhi, India
- St. James's Hospital, Dublin, Ireland
- St. John's Hospital (disambiguation)
- St. Joseph's Hospital (disambiguation)

== Other uses ==
- Sahja railway station, Punjab, Pakistan
- Shanghai Jiading Huilong F.C., a Chinese association football club
- Stephen Joseph Harper (born 1959), prime minister of Canada from 2006 to 2015
