= St. John's School =

St. John's School refer to:

== Canada ==
- Lower Canada College of Montreal, originally known as St. John's School
- St. John Catholic School (Garson, Ontario)
- St. John Catholic School, Toronto
- St. John's School (Quebec), St-Jean-sur-Richelieu, Quebec
- St. John's School (Vancouver), British Columbia
- Saint John's School of Alberta, Stony Plain
- St. John's-Ravenscourt School, Winnipeg, Manitoba
- St. John Community School, Holiday Park, Saskatoon, Greater Saskatoon Catholic Schools

== United Kingdom ==
- St John's Roman Catholic High School
  Dundee, Scotland
- St John Lloyd Catholic Comprehensive School, Llanelli, Wales
- St. John the Baptist School (Aberdare), Aberdare, Wales
- St John's Catholic Comprehensive School, Gravesend, Kent
- St John's Catholic School, County Durham, England
- St. John's Church of England Primary School, Croydon, England
- St John's Priory School, Banbury, Oxfordshire, England
- St John's Roman Catholic School, Essex, England
- St John's School and College, Bedfordshire, England
- St John's School and Community College, Marlborough, England
- St John's School, Billericay, Essex
- St John's School, Enfield
- St John's School, Leatherhead, Surrey, England

== United States ==
- St. John's Military School, Salina, Kansas
- Saint John's Catholic Prep (Maryland)
- St. John's School for Boys, former name of The Manlius School, Manlius, New York
- Saint John School (Ashtabula, Ohio)
- St. John's High School (Delphos, Ohio)
- St. John's Jesuit High School and Academy, Toledo, Ohio
- St. John's School (Texas), Houston, Texas
- St. John's Northwestern Military Academy, Delafield, Wisconsin

=== Insular areas ===
- St. John's School (Guam), Tumon, Guam
- Saint John's School (San Juan), a private school in Puerto Rico

== Other places ==
- St. John's School, a school in Martinez, Pilar, Argentina
- St. John's International School (Belgium), Waterloo, Belgium
- Saint John's School, San Pedro de la Paz, Concepción, Chile
- St. John's School, Cyprus
- St. John's School, Sekondi, Ghana
- St. John's Institution, Kuala Lumpur, Malaysia
- St John's School, Mairangi Bay, New Zealand
- St. John's Diocesan School for Girls, Pietermaritzburg, KwaZulu-Natal, South Africa
- Saint John's International School (Thailand), Bangkok, Thailand

== See also ==
- Saint John's College (disambiguation)
- St. John's High School (disambiguation)
- St. John's Preparatory School (disambiguation)
- St. John's Primary School (disambiguation)
