= Doinall Dhu O'Connor =

Doinall Dhu O'Connor (1894–1975) or Dan, was a New Zealand theatrical manager, concert impresario and businessman. He was born in Auckland, New Zealand in 1894.

O'Connor is most well known for being the impresario who brought the Old Vic Theatre Company to Australia and New Zealand (1948–49), which included players Laurence Olivier and Vivien Leigh.

O'Connor died on 22nd March, 1975, aged 80. He is buried at Purewa Cemetery, Auckland.
