= St. John's Academy =

St. John's Academy may refer to:

== Canada ==
- St. John's Academy, Shawnigan Lake, British Columbia

== Philippines ==
- St. John's Academy of Bataan, Dinalupihan, Bataan
- St. John's Academy, Onse, San Juan, Metro Manila

== United Kingdom ==
- St. John's Academy, an 18th-century school, now St John's House Museum, Warwick
- St. John's Academy, in Marlborough, Wiltshire
- St John's Academy, Perth, Scotland

== United States ==
- St. John's Military Academy, now part of Chaminade College Preparatory School in Chatsworth, Los Angeles, California
- St. John's Academy, associated with Church of St. John the Baptist in Burlington, Iowa
- A former part of St. John's College in Winfield, Kansas
- St. John's Academy, in Hillsdale, New Jersey
- A former name of The Manlius School, Manlius, New York
- A school in the former St. James Basilica in Jamestown, North Dakota
- A former name of Seton Catholic High School in Pittston, Pennsylvania
- A former school in Darlington, South Carolina
- St. John's Academy (Alexandria, Virginia)
- St. John's Northwestern Military Academy, Delafield, Wisconsin

== See also ==
- Saint John's College (disambiguation)
- St. John's High School (disambiguation)
- St. John's School (disambiguation)
