= St John's Theological College =

Several institutions are known as St John's Theological College:

- St John's College, Auckland (formally The College of St John the Evangelist ), New Zealand
- St John's Theological College, Melbourne
- St John's Theological College, Perth
- St John's Theological College, Suva, Fiji
- St John's Theological College, Mthatha, South Africa

See also:

- Saint John's College (disambiguation)
