= Purewa Cemetery =

Cemetery in Auckland, New Zealand

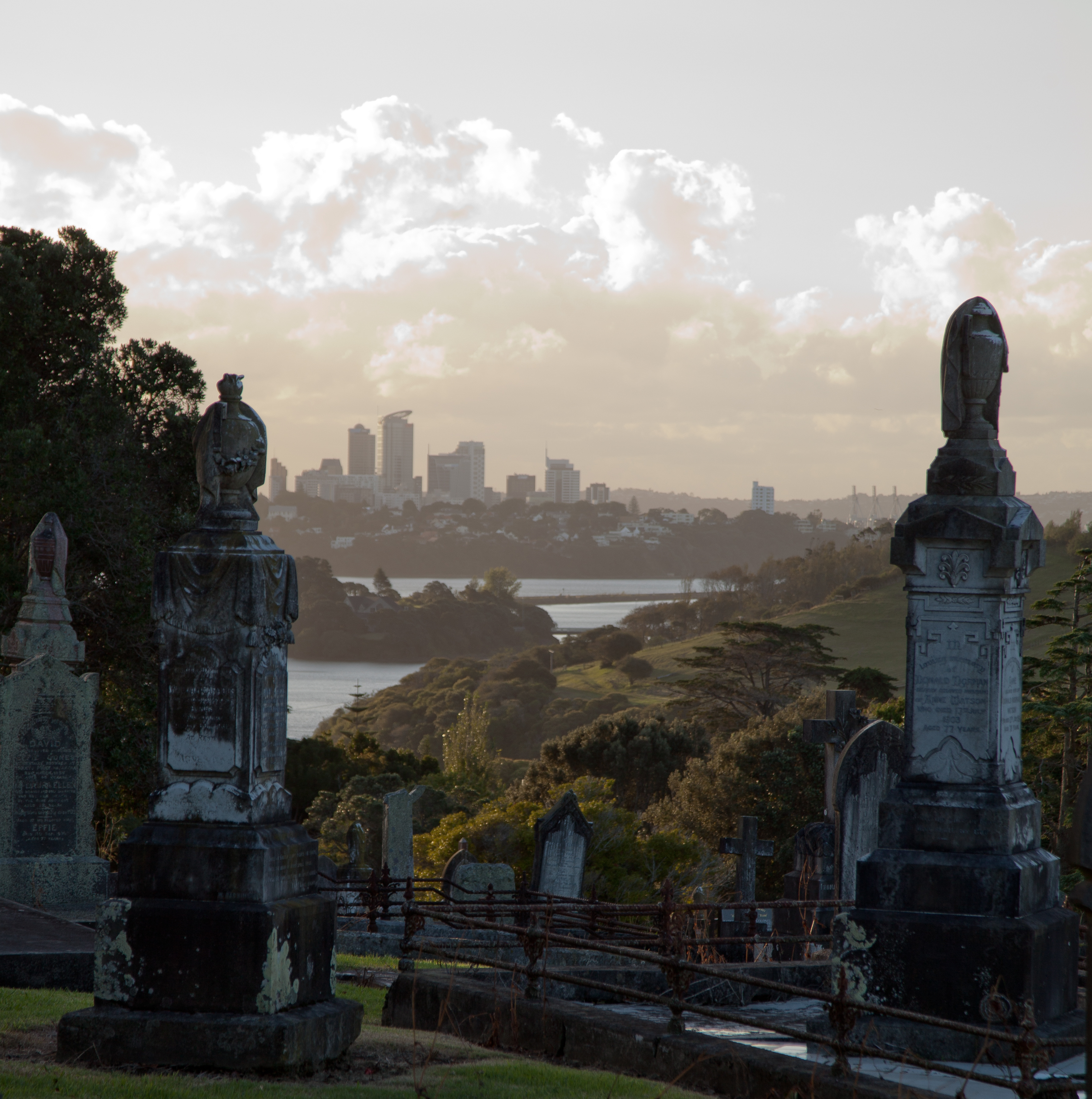
- Purewa Cemetery, with the Auckland city centre in the background
- Interactive map of Purewa Cemetery

Details
- Established: 1889
- Location: Meadowbank, Auckland, New Zealand
- Country: New Zealand
- Coordinates: 36°52′01″S 174°49′44″E
- Owned by: Purewa Cemetery Trust Board (Anglican Diocese of Auckland)
- Size: 45 acres (18 ha)
- Website: Official website

Purewa Cemetery is a privately run cemetery located in Auckland, New Zealand, on the southern banks of the Pourewa Creek. Established on part of the grounds of the St John's Theological College in 1889, the Purewa is one of the few privately run cemeteries in Auckland. It occupies a site of 45 ha (110 acres) and contains two chapels and a crematorium. Notable burials at the cemetery include Prime Minister Robert Muldoon and actor Kevin Smith, and figures including Sir Edmund Hillary and broadcaster Paul Holmes have been cremated at the cemetery.

== Geography and biodiversity ==
Purewa Cemetery is described as being either in the suburb of Meadowbank or St Johns, in Auckland, New Zealand. It is located on the southern banks of the Pourewa Creek on northeastern Auckland isthmus. It is bordered to the north by mangroves growing in the creek. The name 'Purewa' is a corruption of Pourewa, the traditional Tāmaki Māori name for the valley. The name means "raised platform", and refers to a lookout post located at a high point on the north side of the valley. Across the Pourewa Creek valley is the Kepa Bush Reserve, a nature reserve and native bush remnant.

The cemetery has a mix of native vegetation and introduced trees, some of which were planted in the 19th century. The major common exotic species include Liquidambar styraciflua, Quercus palustris, Betula pendula, Syzygium smithii, popular and Cryptomeria japonica. Pōhutukawa is the most common native tree found in the cemetery, which forms avenues and creates a canopy of up to 12 m (39 ft) in height. Other native trees include Vitex lucens and Podocarpus totara. Notable older plantings include English oaks, which were planted along the old cart track from the old wharf to St John's Road, one of the largest Crataegus monogyna trees in Auckland, and likely one of the first Kermadec pōhutukawa trees to be naturalised on mainland New Zealand.

== History ==
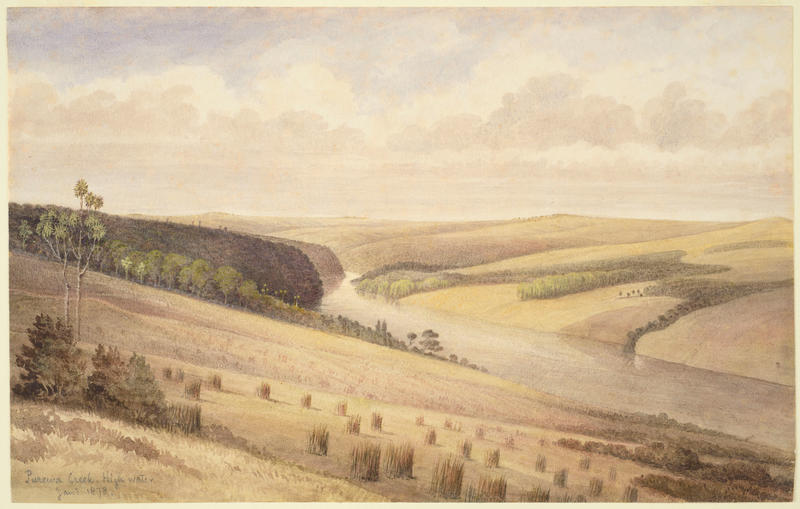
1878 watercolour by John Kinder showing the future site of Purewa Cemetery (right)

The land that later became the Purewa Cemetery was the western edge of the Kohimarama Block, a block of land purchased by the Crown in 1841 from Ngāti Whātua. The Crown then sold land in the Kohimarama Block to George Selwyn, the first Anglican bishop of New Zealand in 1844, who established St John's Theological College to the southeast. Selwyn landed at the future site of the cemetery in mid-to-late 1844, when the Pourewa Creek was navigable by yachts and canoes, and established a temporary settlement at the site. As the permanent site of St John's Theological College became established, the temporary settlement remained as the landing site for vessels accessing the college, operating until at least 1849.

By 1886, there was a growing need for a new cemetery in Auckland, after the Symonds Street Cemetery had become too crowded, and the recently opened Waikumete Cemetery was too far away for many people. The Anglican Synod asked the St John's Trust for land for a cemetery, and the trust set aside 50 acres (20 ha) for the establishment of a cemetery. The first burial was held on 17 January 1889.

The Commonwealth War Graves Commission maintain and record the war graves of 69 Commonwealth services personnel buried here, 50 from World War I and 19 from World War II

In 1930, Purewa railway station was opened adjacent to the cemetery, later closing in 1947.

The cemetery was run directly by the Auckland Anglican Diocesan Synod until 1937, when the Purewa Cemetery Trust Board was established. The members of the trust board are appointed by the Anglican Diocese of Auckland.

In November 1957, the Purewa crematorium was opened, alongside the All Saints Chapel, a venue that can seat 208 people. This was followed be a second cremator in 1982 and the All Souls Chapel, a smaller space allowing for services of up to 56 people. By 2003, catering facilities had been added.

In 2013, an ash-interment trail called the Walk of Memories was established in the cemetery, and in 2017 a mosaic walkway designed by artist Joy Bell was constructed, which focuses on the remembrance of newborn and stillborn babies who have died.

By 2016, more than 50,000 burials and almost 90,000 cremations had been performed at Purewa.

== Burials ==
Some of the notable people buried at the cemetery include:

- Alfred Averill
- Bernard Charles Beale
- Allen Curnow
- George Dare Dowell
- William Fox
- C. F. Goldie
- Henry Goulstone
- John Francis Kavanagh
- Winston McCarthy
- William Pollock Moat
- Horace Moore-Jones
- Robert Muldoon
- Thea Muldoon
- Arthur Purchas
- Kevin Smith
- Yvette Williams

== Cremations ==
Some of the notable people cremated at the cemetery crematoria include:

- John Allum
- Harold Barrowclough
- Annie Mona Burgin
- Edmund Hillary
- Paul Holmes
- John A. Lee
- Dick Smith
- Violet Walrond

== Gallery ==
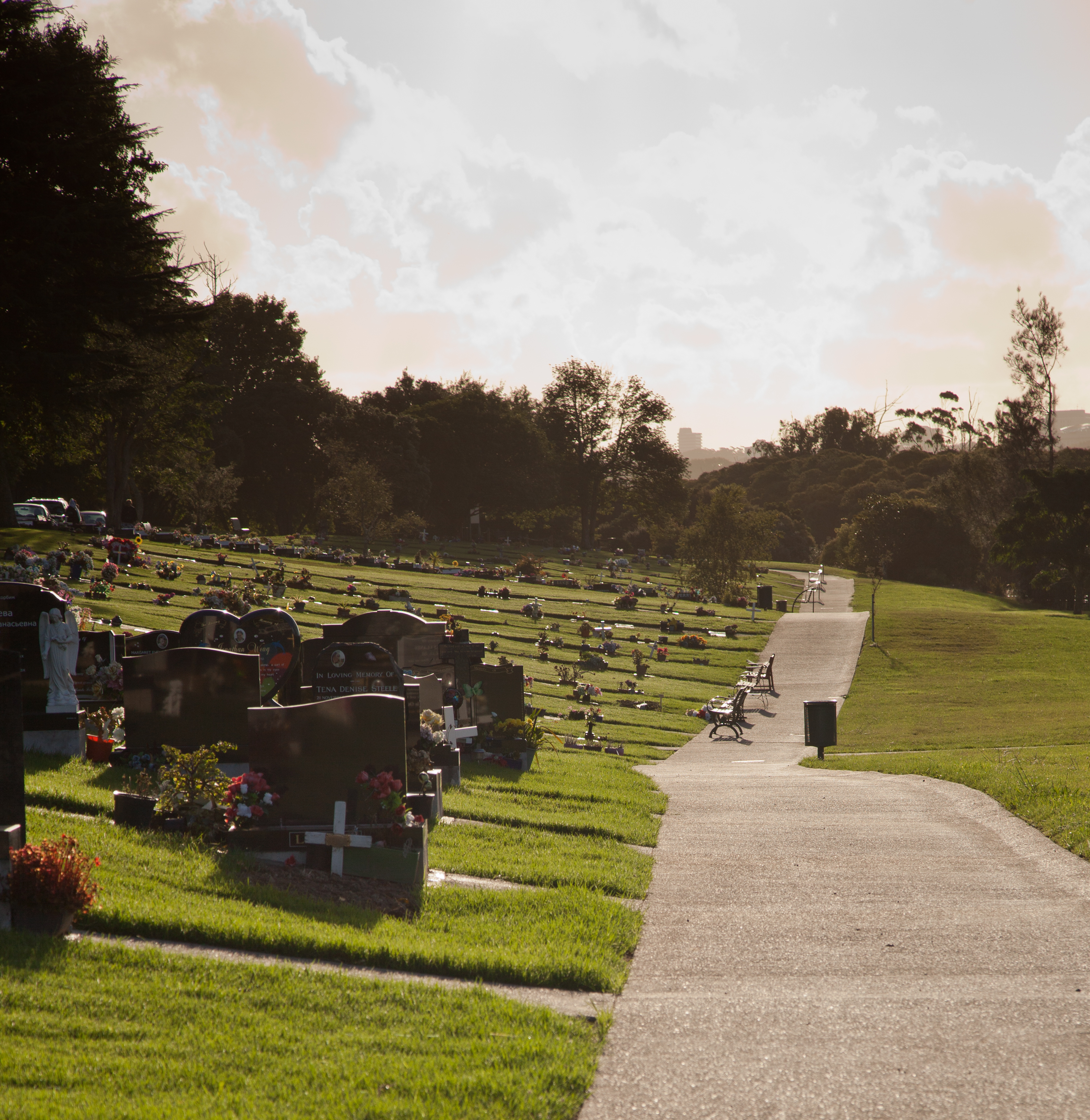
View of Purewa Cemetery

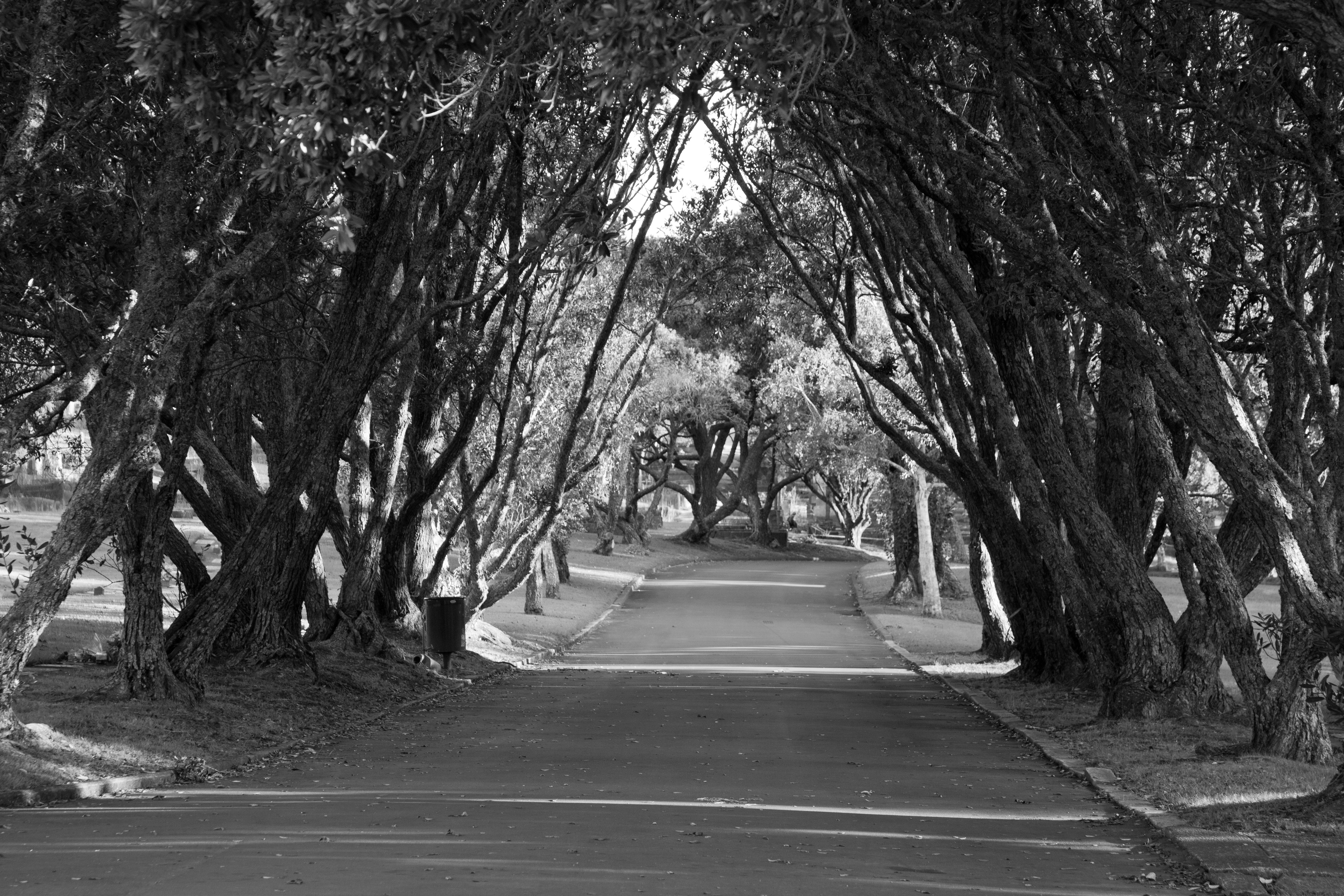
Pōhutukawa tree canopy above an avenue in the cemetery

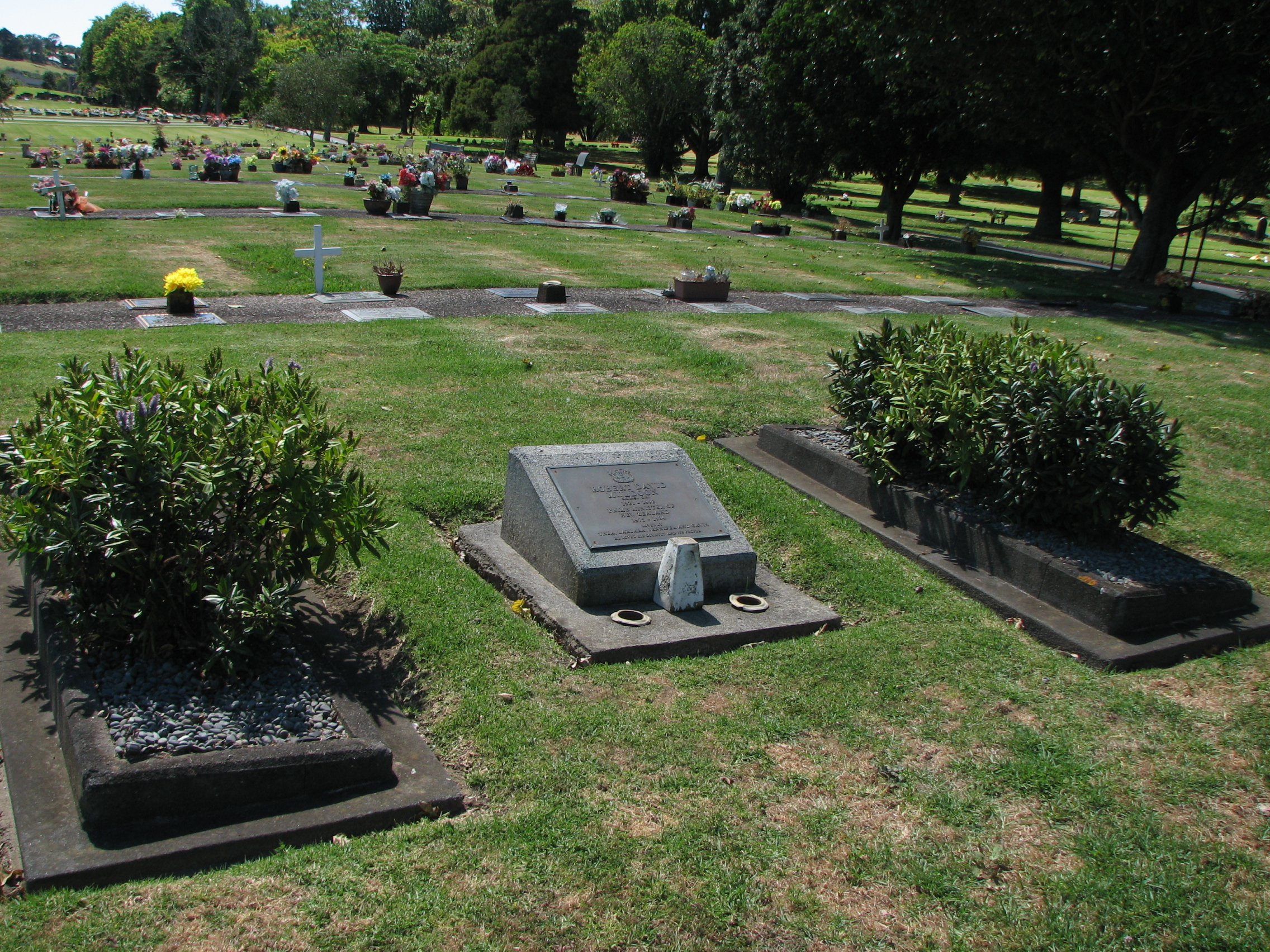
Grave of Robert Muldoon

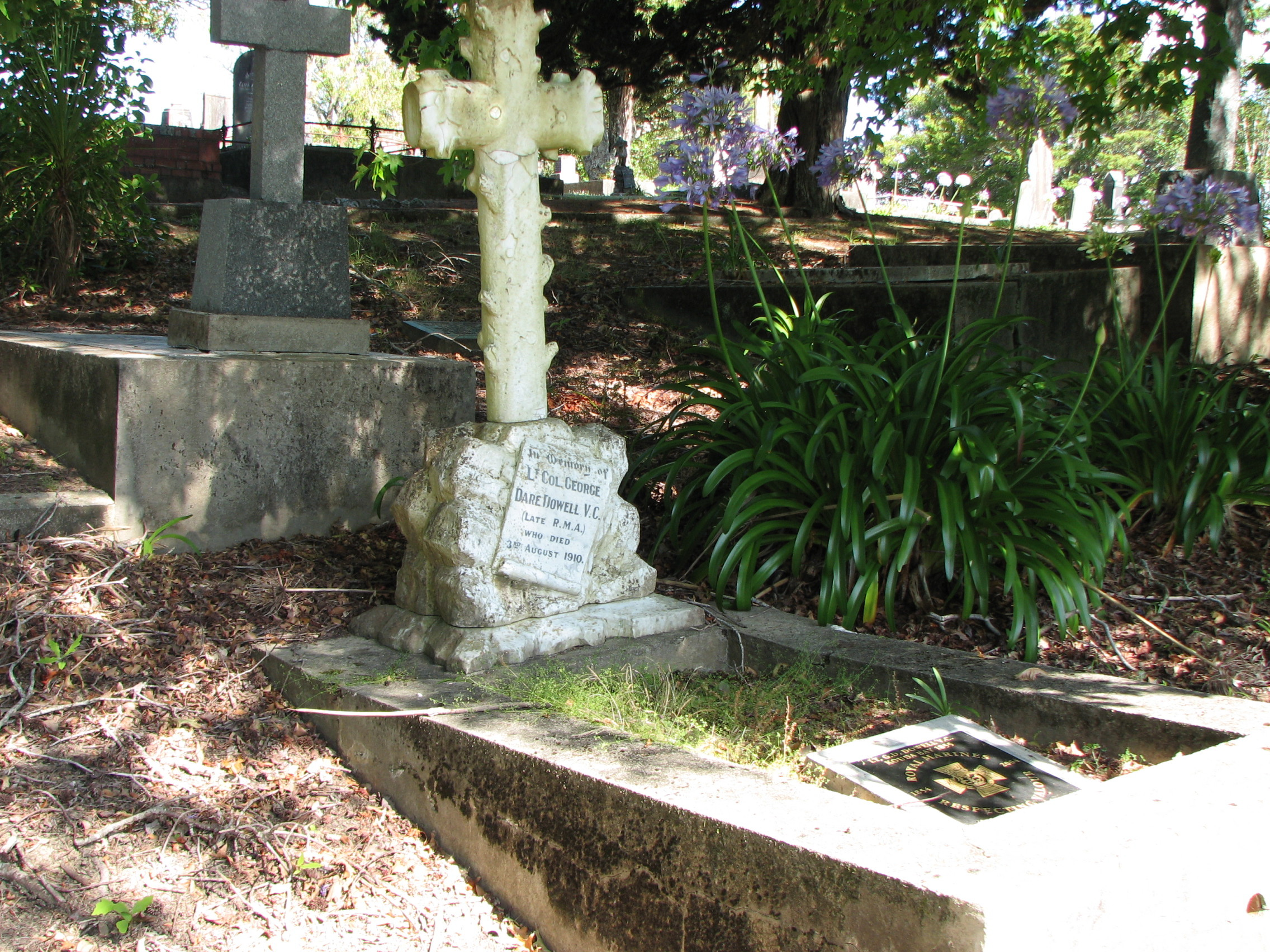
Grave of George Dare Dowell
