= St. John's High School =

Schools named St. John's High School include:

== Bahamas ==
- St John's College High School (Nassau, Bahamas); see Burton P. C. Hall

== Canada ==
- St. John's High School (Winnipeg), North End, Winnipeg

== India ==
- St. John's High School, Amalapuram
- St. John's High School, Bangalore
- St. John's High School, Chandigarh
- St. John's High School, Ranchi
- St. John's High School, Nagpur

== United Kingdom ==
- St John's RC High School, Dundee, Scotland

== United States ==
- St. Johns High School (Arizona) in St. Johns, Arizona
- St. John High School (Plaquemine, Louisiana)
- Saint John's High School (Massachusetts) in Shrewsbury
- St. Johns High School (Michigan) in St. Johns, Michigan
- St. John's High School (Delphos, Ohio)
- St. John's High School, the original name of Seton Catholic High School (Pittston, Pennsylvania)
- St. John's High School (South Carolina) in John's Island, Charleston County
- St. John's College High School in Washington, DC

== Zimbabwe ==
- St. John's High School (Harare), Zimbabwe

== See also ==
- St. John's College High School, Belize
- St. John's Jesuit High School and Academy in Toledo, Ohio
- St. John's Academy (disambiguation)
- Saint John's College (disambiguation)
- St. John's School (disambiguation)
