= Kepa Bush Reserve =

Protected area in New Zealand

Coordinates: 36°51′46.82″S 174°49′49.52″E

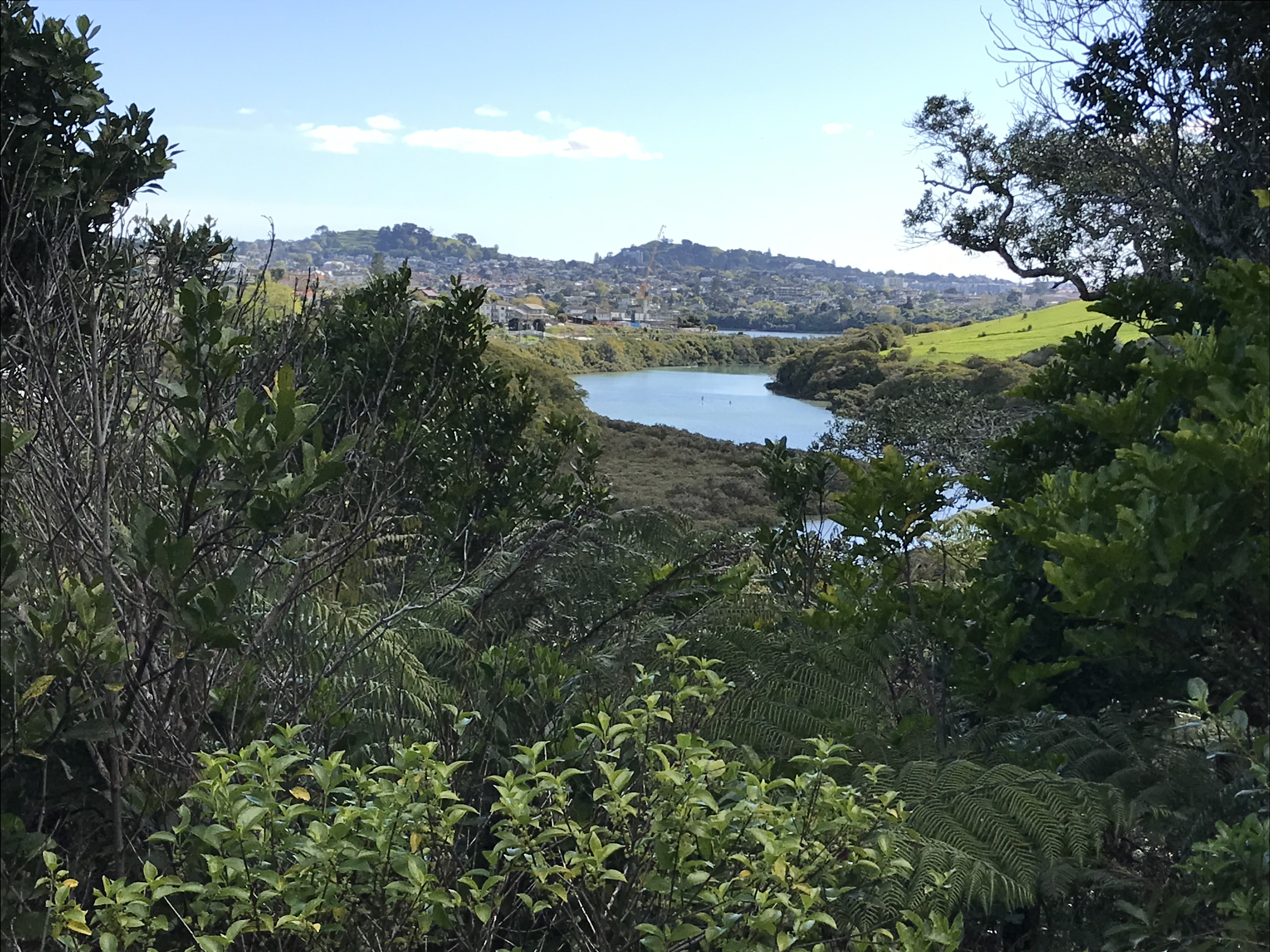
- West facing view from the Kepa Bush Reserve, featuring the Pourewa Creek, and in the background Mount Saint John and Ōhinerau / Mount Hobson
- Interactive map of Kepa Bush Reserve
- Type: Public park
- Location: Auckland, New Zealand
- Area: 13 ha (32 acres)
- Created: 1962
- Operator: Auckland Council
- Status: Open year round

Kepa Bush Reserve is an ecological reserve on the Auckland isthmus in New Zealand, south of Mission Bay. It is situated near the smaller St John's Bush and is also known as the Pourewa Valley.

== Geology and biodiversity ==
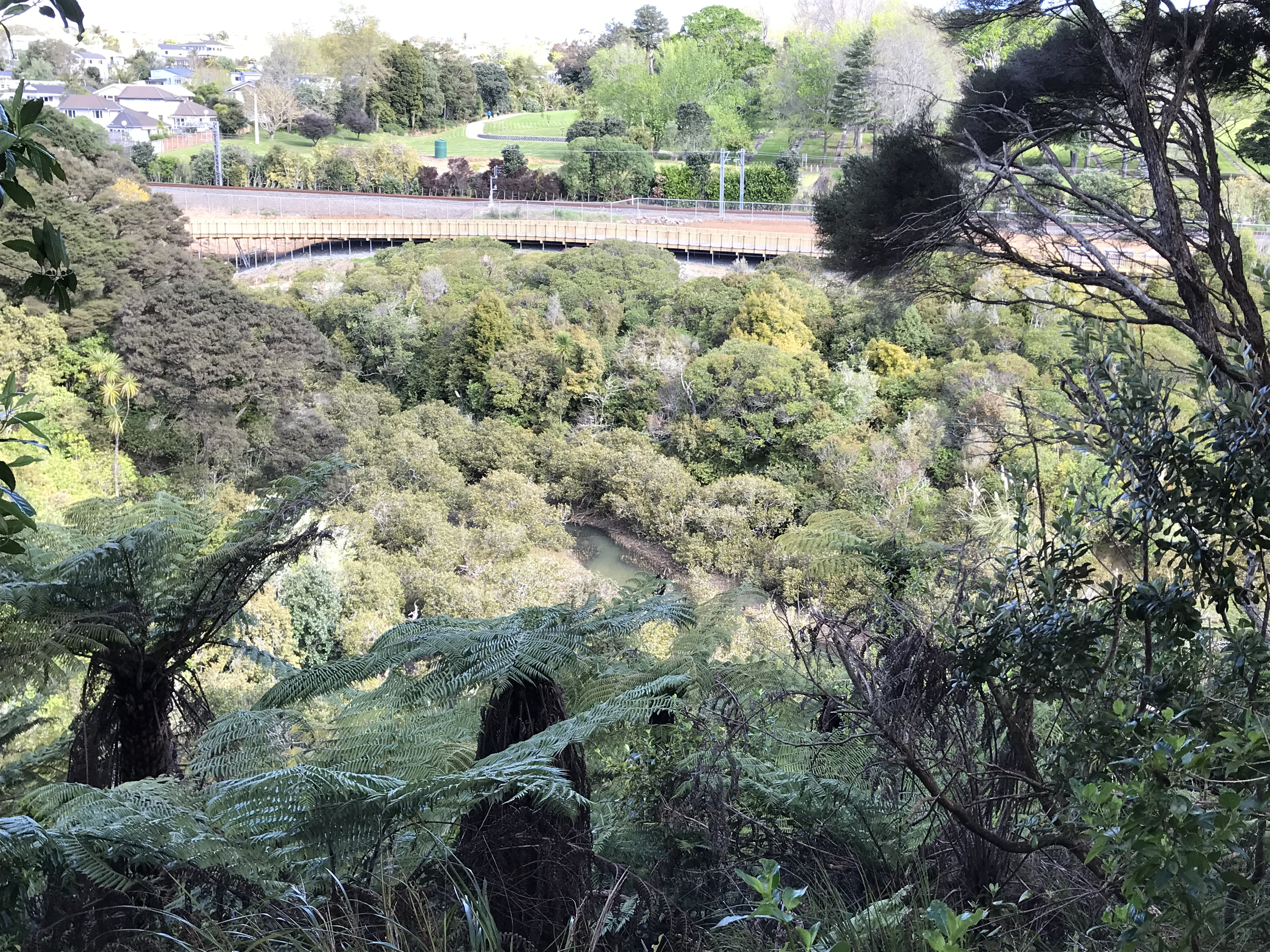
View south from the Kepa Bush Reserve, featuring the Purewa Creek, Eastern Line and the Purewa Cemetery.

The Kepa Bush Reserve is the largest native bush remnant on the Auckland isthmus. The reserve is formed by the slopes of a sandstone ridge, between Kepa Road and the Pourewa Creek. The Pourewa Creek at the south of the reserve flows westwards towards the Ōrākei Basin. The forest ecosystem of the upper ridge transitions into the mangrove ecosystem of the Pourewa Creek, something very rarely seen in the reserves of the Waitematā Harbour catchments.

The flora in Kepa Bush is diverse and the most common plants and trees include Totara, Rimu, Kanuka, and Manuka. Fuchsia excorticata can be found in the forest; often rare as it is often eaten by possums. Fauna is very common, with Tūī, Pigeon, Grey warbler, Silvereye and Morepork being the most common. Tomtit and Kaka are occasional.

== History ==
The reserve honours the memory of Te Keepa Te Rangihiwinui, a Māori military commander and ally of the government forces during the New Zealand Wars. He is also known as Te Keepa, Major Keepa or Major Kemp. During the land wars of the 1860s he fought for government forces against Te Kooti and Tītokowaru. Besides that, Kepa Bush was used by Maori pre-colonisation as a place to find food and make weapons. It was probably a strategic location to take as it had a view out into the Orakei Basin.

The land was purchased by Bishop Selwyn in 1844, as a part of the grounds of the St John's College. In 1962, the reserve was established after the Auckland City Council purchased the site.
