= St Johns Park =

St Johns Park or St. John's Park may refer to:

== Australia ==
- St Johns Park, New South Wales, a suburb of Sydney
  - St Johns Park High School, a high school in Sydney
- St Johns Park, Tasmania, a locality in Hobart

== Ireland ==
- St John's Park, home ground of O'Loughlin Gaels GAA, Kilkenny

== United Kingdom ==
- St. John's Park (stadium), ground of Heather St John's F.C. in Heather, Leicestershire, England

== United States ==
=== New York City ===
- St. John's Park, a former park, square, and neighborhood of Manhattan, New York City
- St. John's Park Terminal, demolished freight terminal of the Hudson River Railroad's West Side Street-Running Freight Trains, which was replaced by the High Line and St. John's Terminal in 1934
- St. John's Terminal, the Google-owned ex-freight-terminal of the New York Central Railroad High Line
- James J. Walker Park or St. John's Park, a park in Manhattan, New York City

=== Other ===
- St. Johns Park, Flagler County, Florida, a community in Flagler County, Florida
- St. Johns Park (Portland, Oregon), a park

== See also ==
- Hudson Square, a nearby Manhattan neighborhood
