= SJU =

SJU may refer to:

== Education ==
- Saint John's University (disambiguation), the name of several institutions
- Saint Joseph's University, a private university in Philadelphia, Pennsylvania, United States
- Sejong University, a private university in Seoul, South Korea
- Shanghai Jiao Tong University, a public university in Shanghai, China
- Southwest Jiaotong University, a public university in Chengdu, Sichuan, China
- St. Jerome's University, a public university in Waterloo, Ontario, Canada

== Other uses ==
- Luis Muñoz Marín International Airport, in Carolina, Puerto Rico, IATA airport code SJU
- Sju Hundred, a former subdivision of Uppland, Sweden, Northern Europe
- Ume Sámi, the ISO 639-3 language code sju
