= St. Johns, Florida (disambiguation) =

St. Johns, Florida may refer to:

- St. Johns, Florida, an unincorporated community
- St. Johns County, Florida
- St. Johns River in Florida
- St. John's Cathedral, Jacksonville
