= Saint John's International School (Thailand) =

Coordinates: 13.809378°N 100.562732°E

- โรงเรียนนานาชาติเซนต์จอห์น
- 1110/3, Vibhavadi Rangsit Road Lat Yao Subdistrict, Chatuchak District Bangkok, Thailand, 10900

Information
- Type: Private International school
- Motto: Sapientia Scientia Sanctitas (Wisdom Knowledge Holiness)
- Established: November 30, 1991
- Closed: June 29, 2017
- Head of school: Tony Atkinson
- Gender: Co-educational
- Affiliation: Saint John's Group of Schools and University
- Website: www.stjohn.ac.th/international

Saint John's International School (Thai: โรงเรียนนานาชาติเซนต์จอห์น, RTGS: Rong Rian Nana Chat Sen Chon) (SJIS) was an international school located in Chatuchak District, Bangkok, Thailand. It was established in 1991 by Ajarn Samai Chinnapa within Saint John's Group of Schools and University (established in 1961). The school closed in June 2017.

The school offered students an international education from Nursery to Year 13 (Kindergarten to grade 12). The school was divided into three phases : Infants (nursery and Key Stage 1), Junior / Middle School (Key Stage 2 and 3) and High School (Key Stages 4 and 5). The school followed the British Curriculum (See Education in England) to Year 11 where students took IGCSE; students in Senior High School undertook a university preparation programme. Students who successfully completed Year 13 (grade 12) were awarded with a High School Diploma. St. John's International School was a founding member of the International School Association of Thailand (ISAT). It was also the first school in Thailand to be designated under the Safe School Community International Accreditation Programme (SSCIAP) by the Safe Communities Foundation New Zealand.

== Curriculum ==
Saint John's International School operated within the framework of the National Curriculum for England and Wales. With full provision made for study in Thai language and culture (including Thai Dancing) as required by the Thai Ministry of Education.

Junior High School Students (Year 10 and 11) undertook IGCSE courses, which was followed by a university preparation programme in Year 12 and 13 (grades 11 and 12). Students graduating from the school received a high school diploma which permitted entry to university throughout the world. For Thai students they also received Mathayom 6 high school leaving equivalency, and therefore enabled a smooth transition to Thai public and private universities.

Classes were taught by expatriate teachers of various nationalities, giving the school a true international feel. Additional support was provided by EAL (English as an additional language) qualified teachers, classroom assistants and, when appropriate, SEN (Special Education Needs) assistants.

=== Levels/Classes ===
- Pre-School: On Thursdays throughout term time, the school hosted a playgroup for pre-school children. During the school holidays they offered Little Saints Holiday Club.
- Early Years: Nursery and Reception (Kindergarten 1 - Kindergarten 2)
- Infants - Key Stage 1 : Year 1 and 2 (Kindergarten 3 and Grade 1)
- Juniors - Key Stage 2 : Year 3 and 4; Year 5 and 6 + Year 7 (Grade 2 - Grade 6)
- Middle School - Key Stage 3 : Year 8 and 9 Grade 7 and 8)
- High School - Key Stage 4 and 5 : Year 10 - 13 (Grades 9 - 12).

== Headmasters ==
- 1991-2000: The school opened under the leadership of Mr Alun Thomas as Founding Headmaster who was instrumental in securing the school's first accreditation with WES World-wide Education Service of CfBT Education Trust (now CfBT Education Trust) and planning for the new campus.
- 2000-2004: Mr Bruce Gamwell became Headmaster and led the school through its transition from being part of the Saint John's Thai School complex to its own separate campus.
- 2004-2007: Mr Martin Scott took over as Headmaster.
- 2007-2009: Mr John Boakes was appointed as the 4th Headmaster of Saint John's International School having been the Head of Primary at the school.
- 2009–2012: Mr David Lowder.
- 2012–29 June 2017 : Mr Tony Atkinson.

== Campus and facilities ==
The school was located in Chatuchak District, Bangkok, Thailand, about halfway between the central business district and Don Mueang International Airport.

The school had air-conditioned classrooms and science, drama, music, and ICT rooms. It had an extremely well resourced library. The school was positioned around one playground, a 200m all-weather running track, a football pitch, an athletics field, a gymnasium and a 25m swimming pool with 270 seat stand.

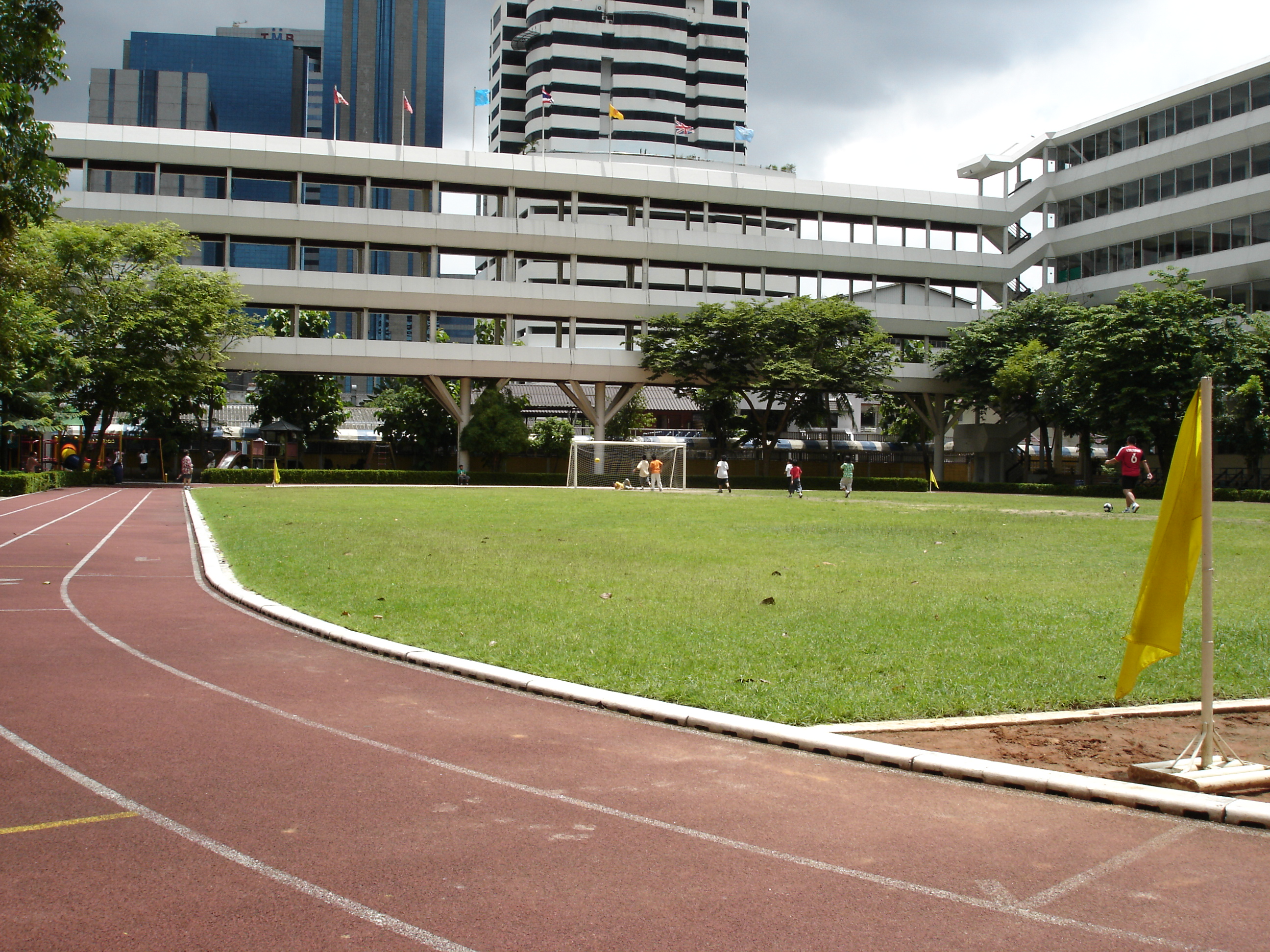

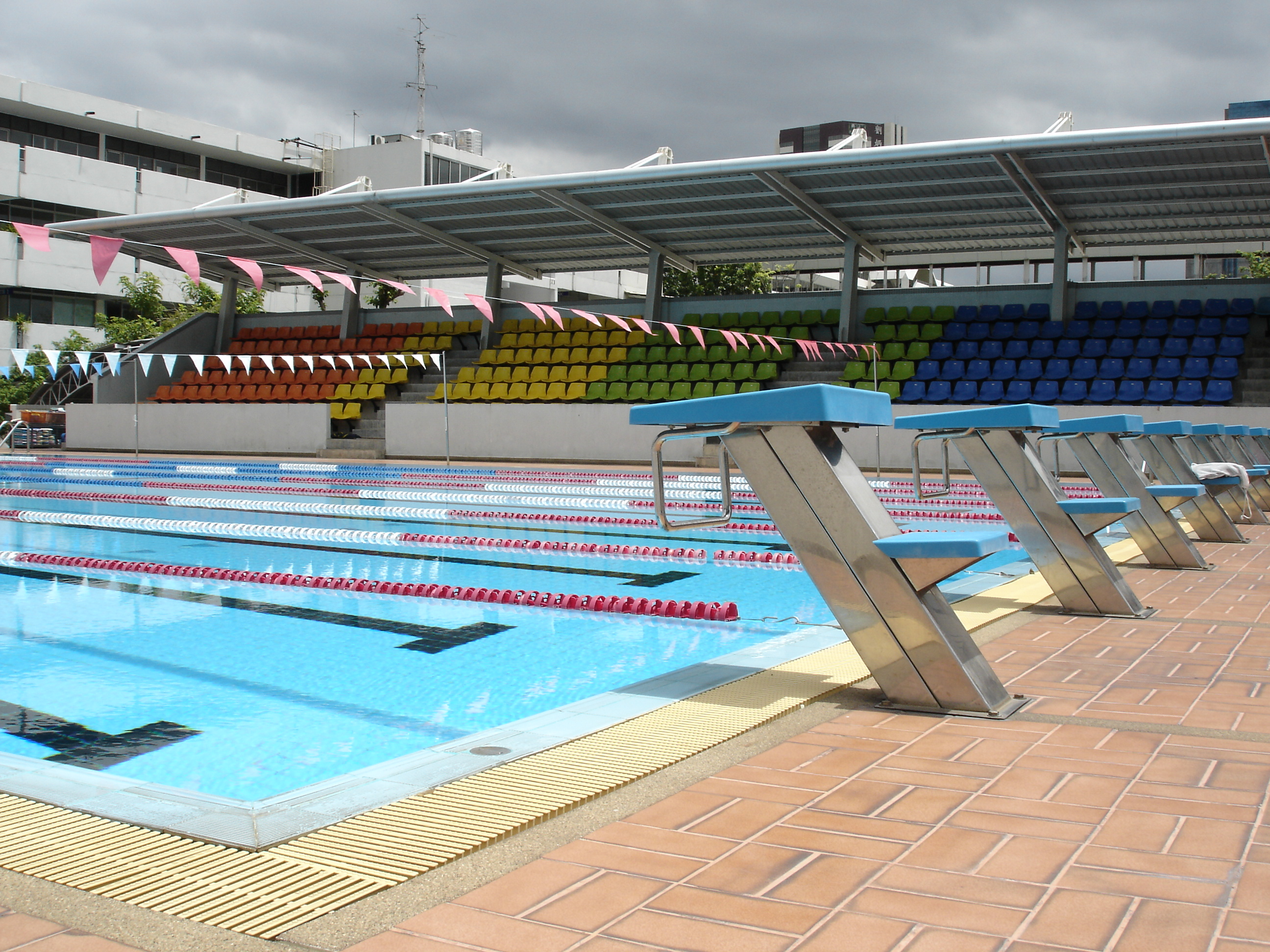

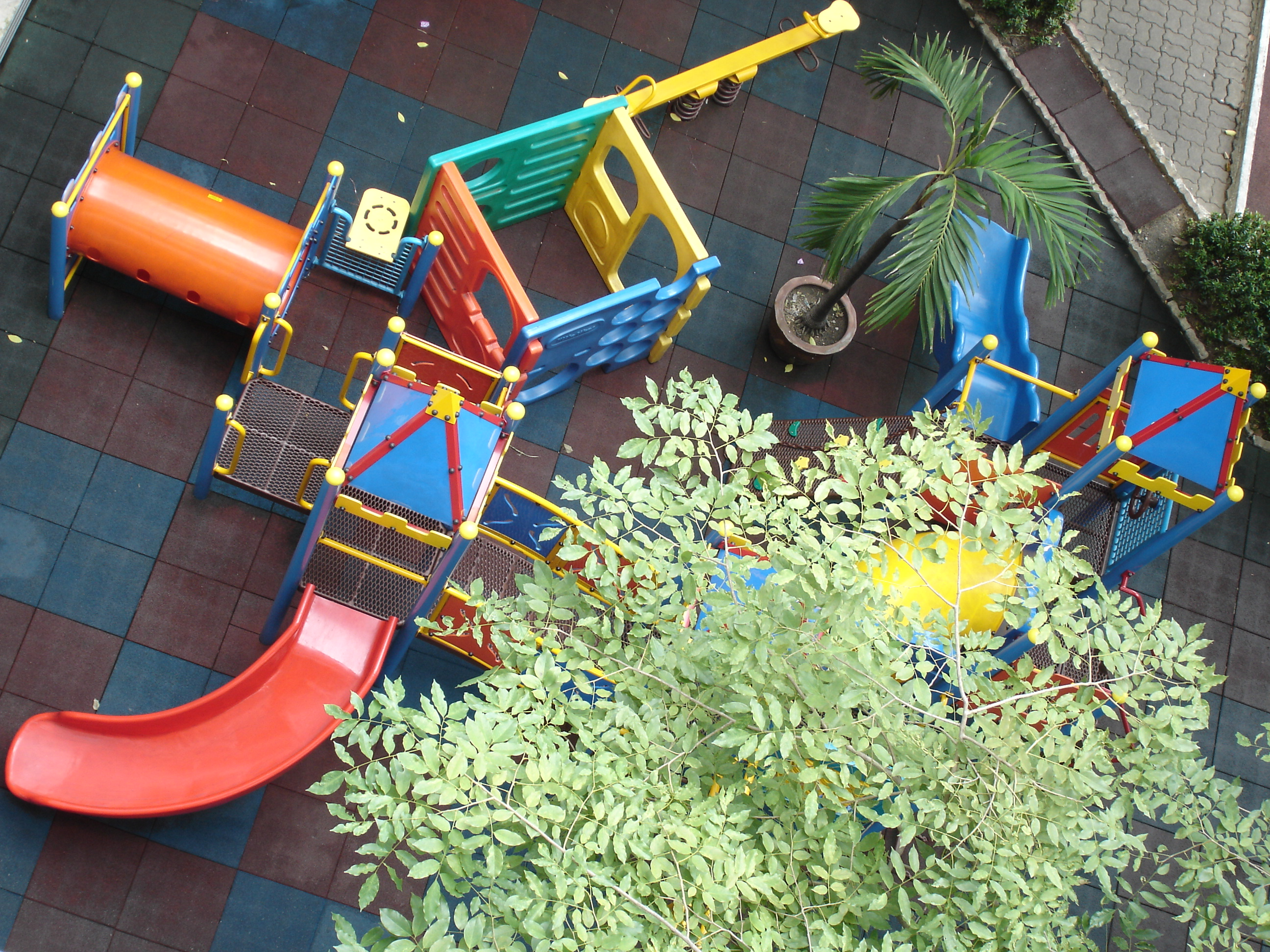

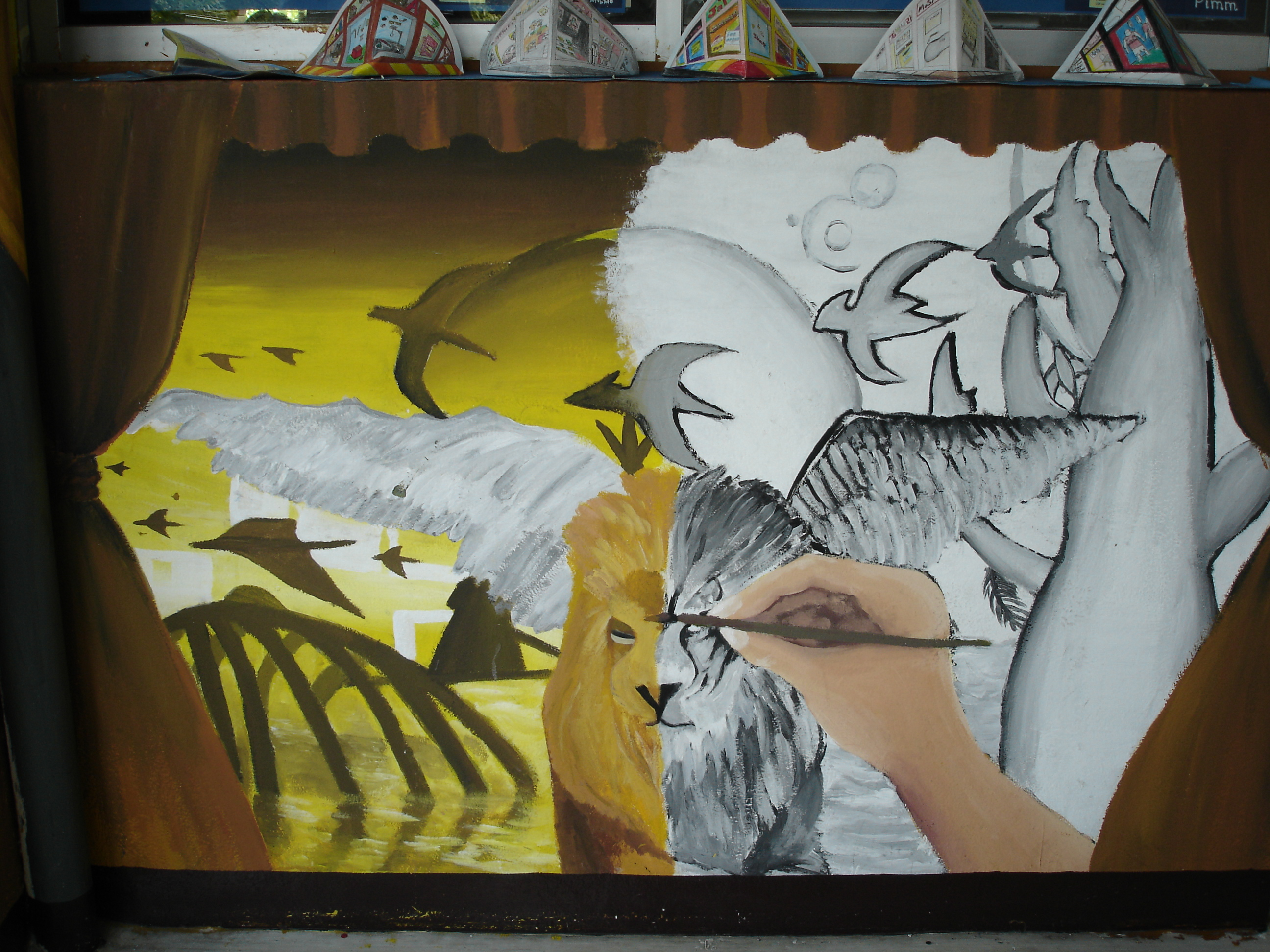
