= St. John's Primary School =

St. John's Primary School may refer to:

- St. John's Primary School, Knaresborough, England
- St. John's Primary School, Ayr, Ayrshire, Scotland
- St. John's Primary School, Coalisland, Coalisland, County Tyrone, Northern Ireland
- St. John's Primary School, Euroa, Euroa, Victoria, Australia
- St. John's Primary School, Gilford, Gilford, County Down, Northern Ireland
- St. John's Primary School, Harare, Harare, Zimbabwe
- St. John's Primary School, Middletown, Middletown, County Armagh, Northern Ireland
- St. John's Primary School, Moy, Moy, County Tyrone, Northern Ireland
- St. John's Primary School, Newry, County Down, Northern Ireland
- St. John's Primary School, Portadown, Portadown, County Armagh, Northern Ireland
- St. John's Primary School, Stevenston, Stevenston, Ayrshire, Scotland
- St John's Roman Catholic Primary School, Banbury, Oxfordshire, England
- St. John's Church of England Primary School, Croydon, England
- St. Johns Primary School, Worksop, Nottinghamshire, England
