= St Johns Bush =

Nature reserve in Auckland, New Zealand

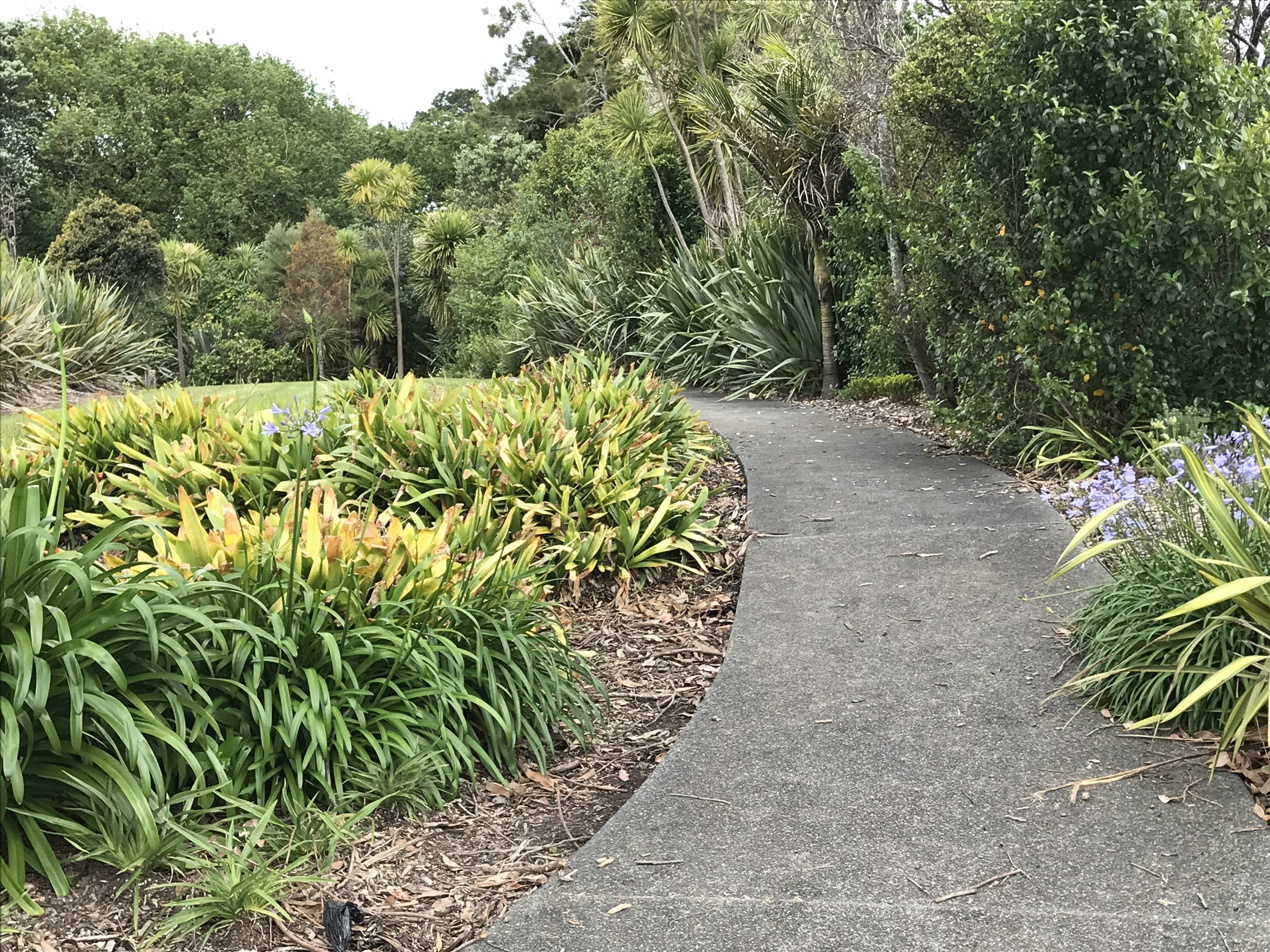
- St Johns Bush in 2021
- Interactive map of St Johns Bush
- Type: Public park
- Location: Auckland, New Zealand
- Coordinates: 36°52′19.01″S 174°50′28.42″E
- Area: 5 ha (12 acres)
- Operator: Auckland Council
- Status: Open year round

St Johns Bush is a reserve in central Auckland in New Zealand. It is situated in a small valley near the larger Kepa Bush Reserve. It is named after the nearby suburb St Johns.

== Flora and fauna ==
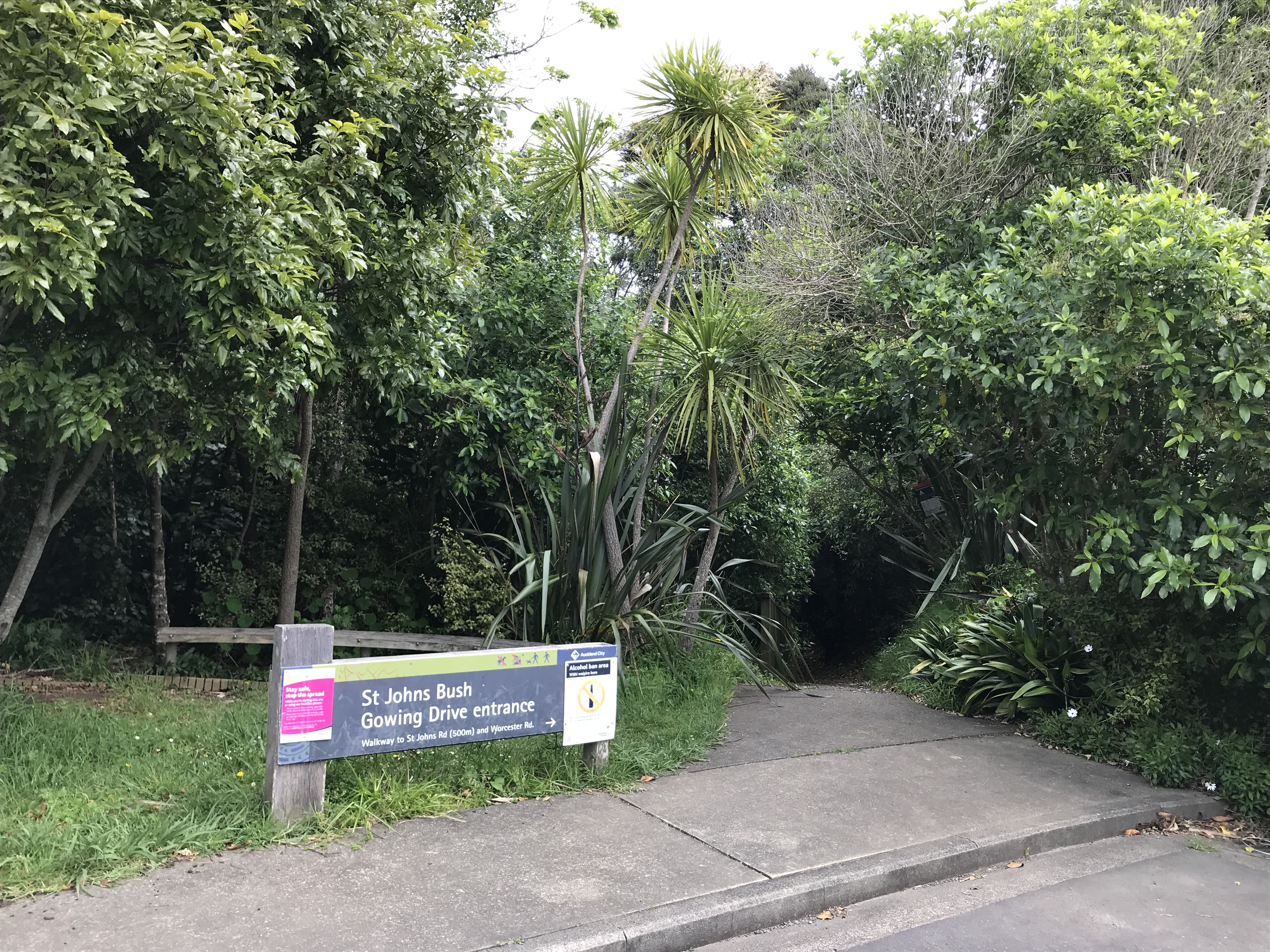
Gowing Drive entrance to St Johns Bush in 2021

Flora and fauna inside the reserve include a large kauri tree which is almost in the middle of the reserve, estimated to be around 150 years old. Other trees include kānuka, karaka, kōwhai, pōhutukawa and rimu.

A small wetland system that runs through the reserve is home to longfin eel. Whitebait and freshwater bivalves are also present.

The native birds of the reserve include tūī, New Zealand pigeons, grey warblers, silvereyes and New Zealand fantails. Introduced species including eastern rosella and Australian magpies are occasionally seen.

Kākā sometimes stop off at St Johns Bush on their way to the Whangaparāoa Peninsula on the North Shore. Kaka feed off berries and fruit.

== History ==
St Johns Bush was set aside as a reserve by Bishop George Selwyn and his wife Sarah in the mid-19th Century. In 1994 Auckland Council initiated a plan to rezone a considerable part of St Johns Bush. Forest & Bird became involved and this was ceased. In 2000 Auckland Council acquired St Johns Bush. In 2004 Auckland Council purchased another hectare of land.
