= Saint John's University =

St John's University may refer to:

- St. John's University (New York City)
  - St. John's University School of Law
  - St. John's University (Italy), overseas campus in Rome, Italy
- College of Saint Benedict and Saint John's University, St. Joseph, Minnesota and Collegeville, Minnesota
  - St. John's University, Minnesota (CDP), a census-designated place in Minnesota
- St. John's University (1887–1952), in Shanghai, China
- St. John's University (Taiwan), successor institution of the St. John's University in Shanghai
- St. John's University (Springfield, Louisiana), an unaccredited institution later based in Temecula, California
- St. John's University of Tanzania, in Dodoma, Tanzania, East Africa
- St. John's University School of Medicine, unaccredited medical school supposedly based in Montserrat
- Saint John's Group of Schools and University, in Bangkok, Thailand

== See also ==
- Sju (disambiguation)
- Saint John's College (disambiguation)
