= St Johns Park, Tasmania =

St Johns Park is a locality in the Hobart suburb of New Town, Tasmania. Buildings including St John's Anglican Church, New Town and a watch-house located on the road leading to the precinct are listed on the Tasmanian Heritage Register.

In 1828, the orphan schools "King's Orphan Schools" were established in New Town near the New Town Rivulet and "Queen's Orphan Schools" in Davey Street. They were later relocated to St Johns Park in 1833. The infants and older children in the orphan school were often children of Tasmanian convicts.

In the early 20th century, the St Johns Park precinct was the location of some tuberculosis chalets.

In May 2023, the St Johns Park precinct was announced to be an adjunct facility of the Royal Hobart Hospital.
