= Saint John's Group of Schools and University =

Catholic private educational institutions

Saint John's Group of Schools & University
- Motto: Sapientia Scientia Sanctitas (Wisdom Knowledge Holiness)
- Type: Thai, International
- Established: 1961; 65 years ago
- Location: Bangkok, Thailand
- Nickname: SJU
- Website: www.stjohn.ac.th

Saint John's Group of Schools and University (Thai: กลุ่มโรงเรียนเซนต์จอห์น) is a group of private Catholic educational institutions run by the Vincentian located in Thailand. It was organized in 1961.

The group consists of:

- Saint John's Kindergarten
- Saint John's School (primary and secondary)
- Saint John's School, Thabom (secondary)
- St. John's International School (British and North American curriculum)
- Saint John's Polytechnic School
- Saint John's Technology School
- Saint John's College of Commerce (English programme)
- Saint John's University

It is possible for a child to enter Saint John's kindergarten at age 2 and finish with a PhD without ever leaving the group. Many of Saint John's staff are alumni of one of Saint John's eight schools.

== Saint John's choir ==
Saint John's School is the home of Saint John's Choir.

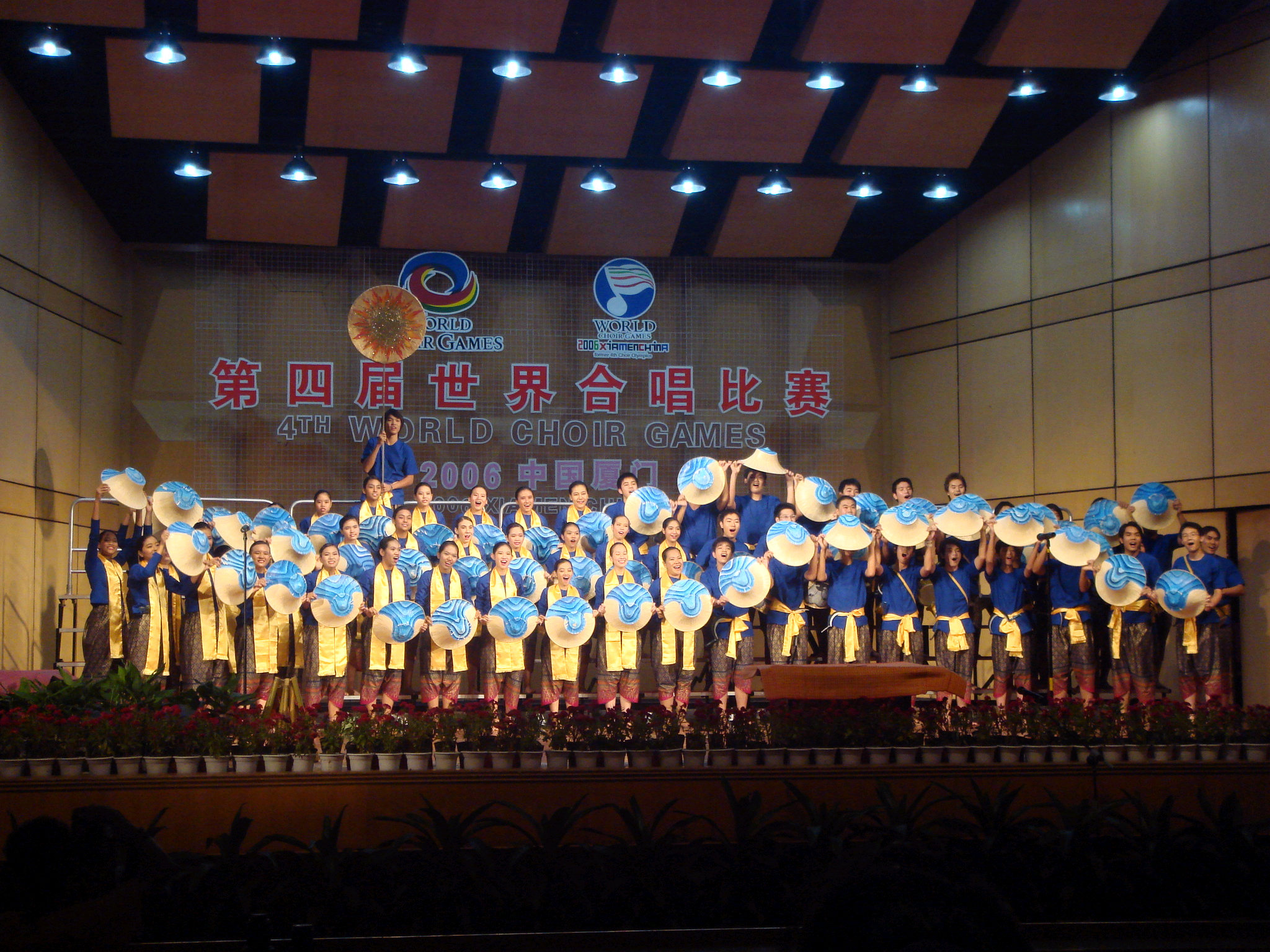

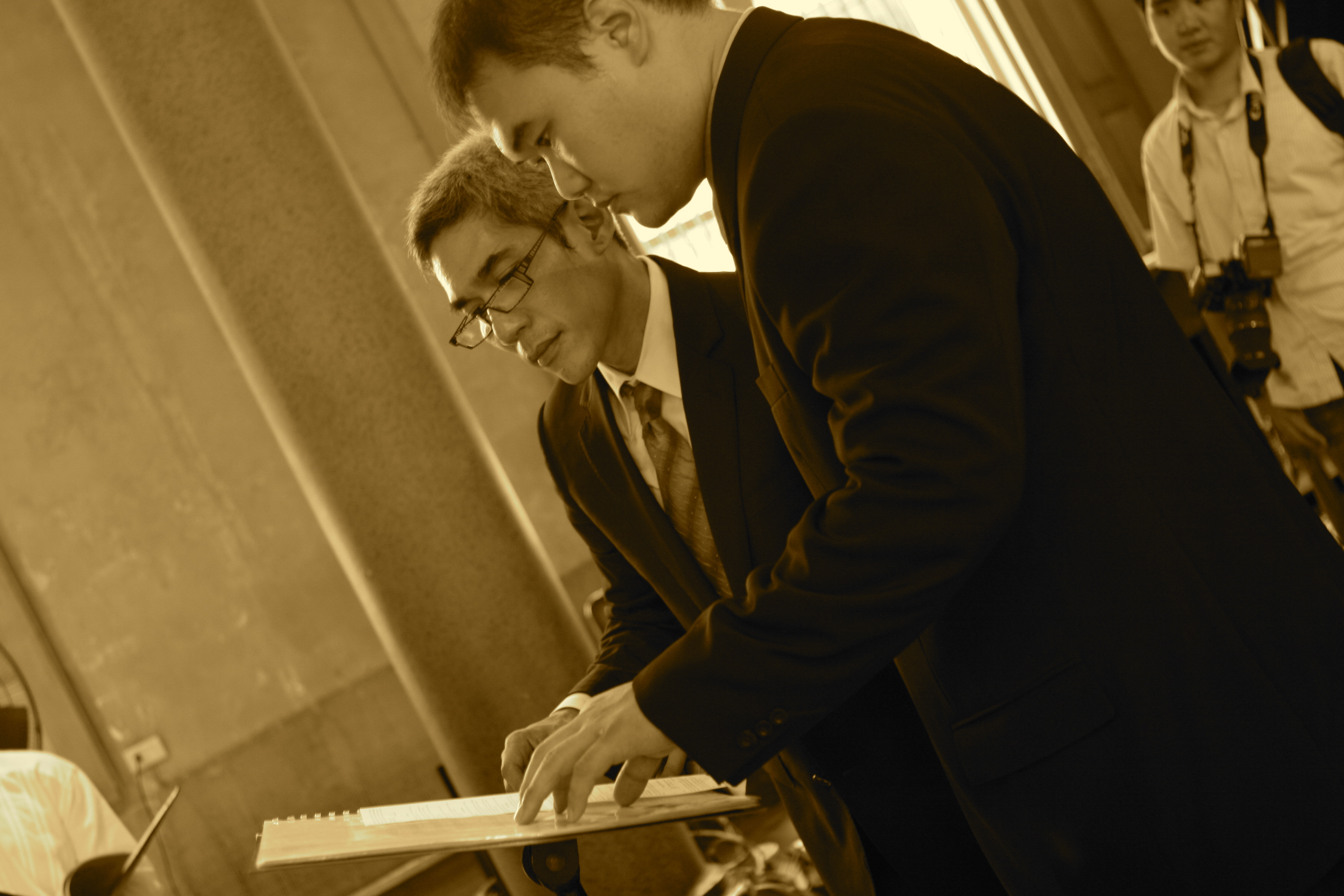

== Gallery ==
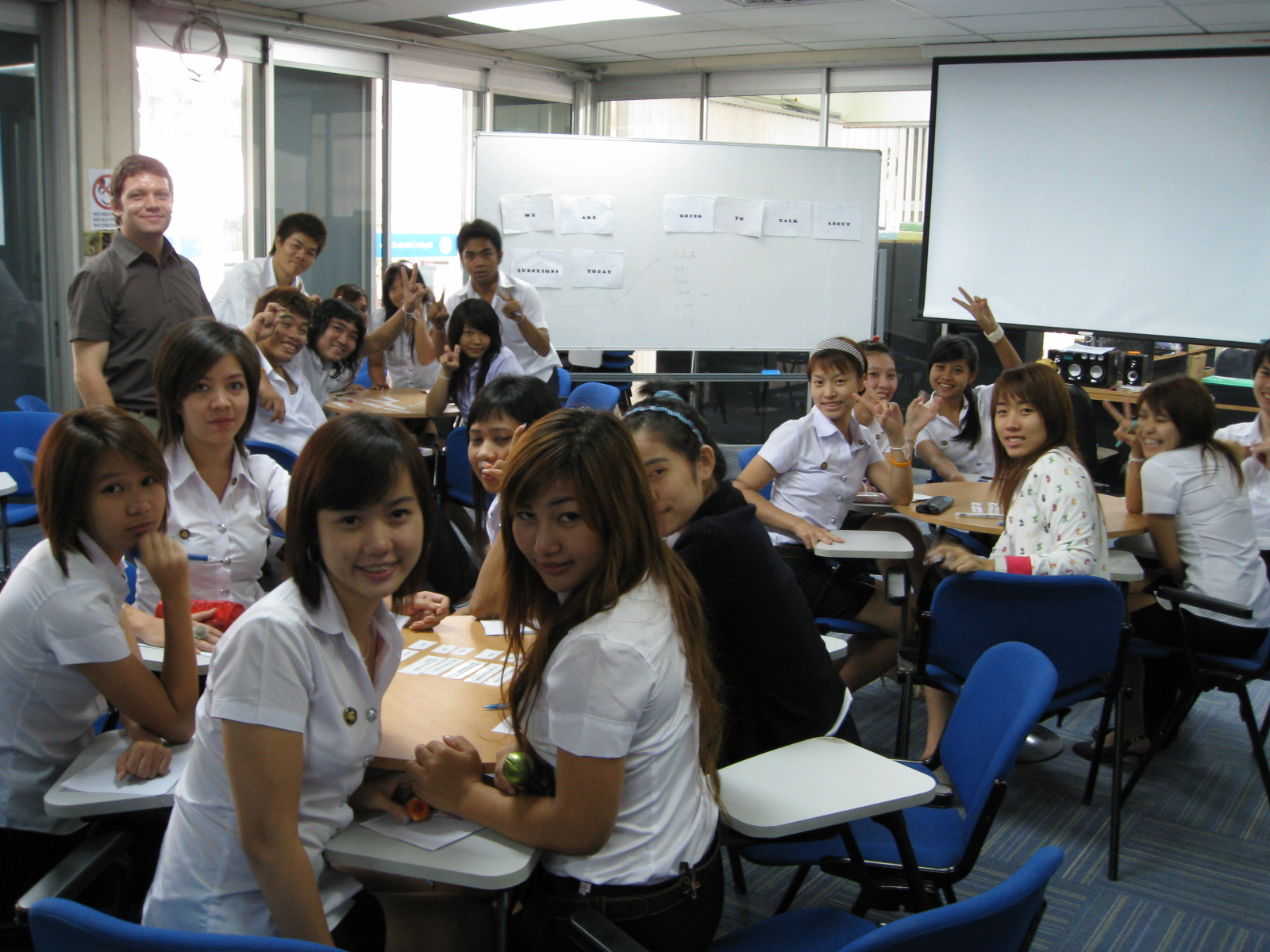

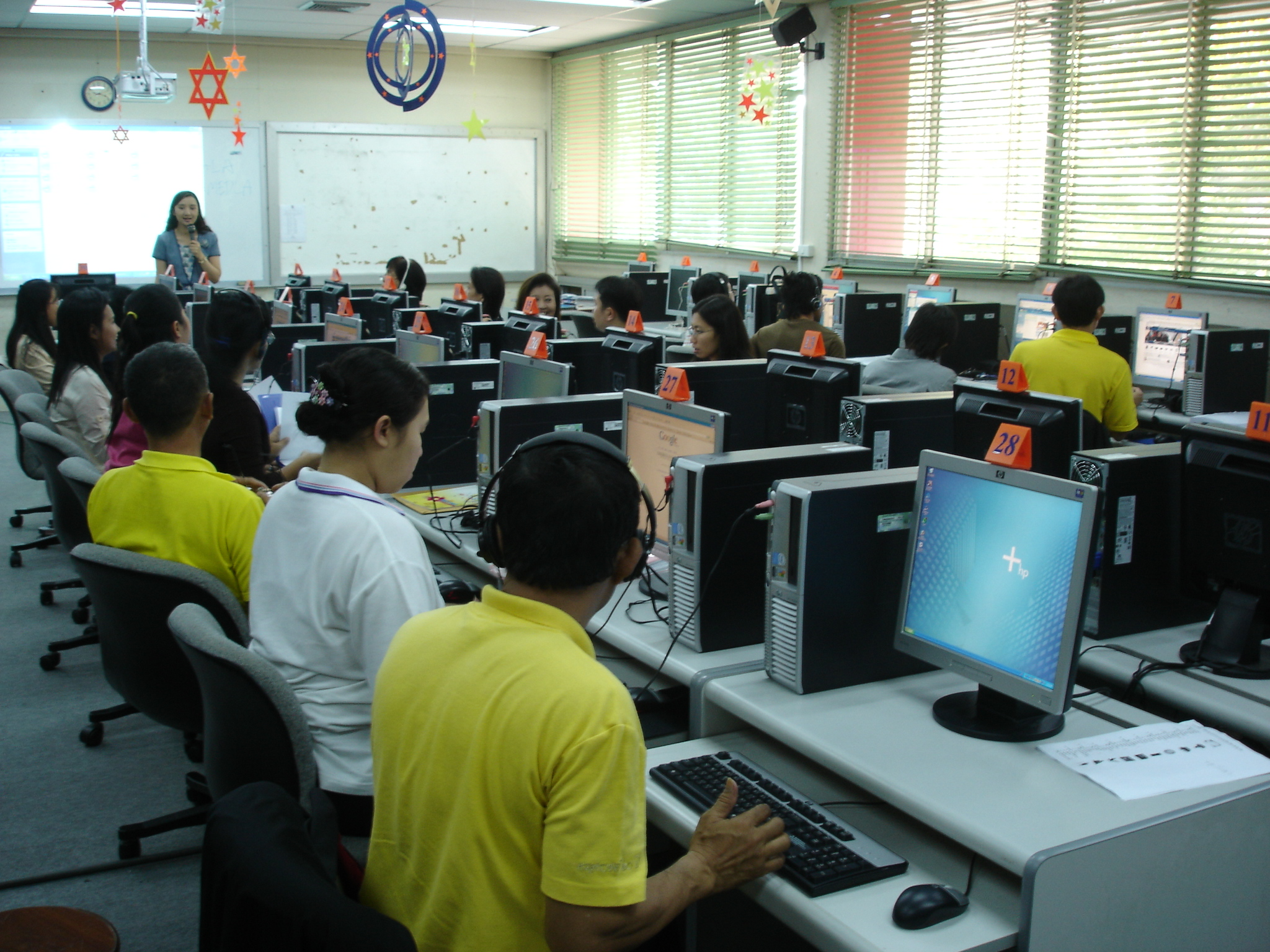

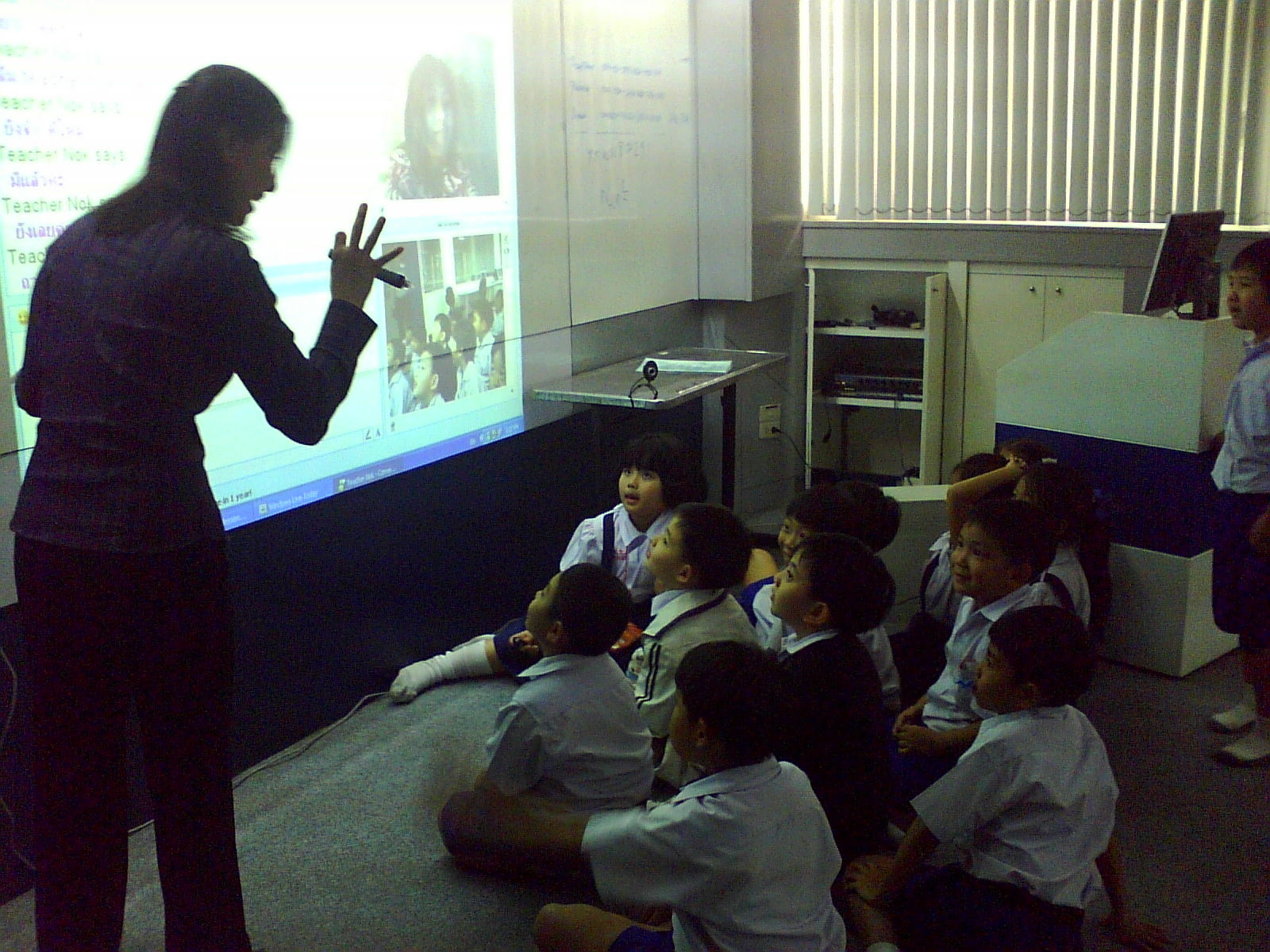

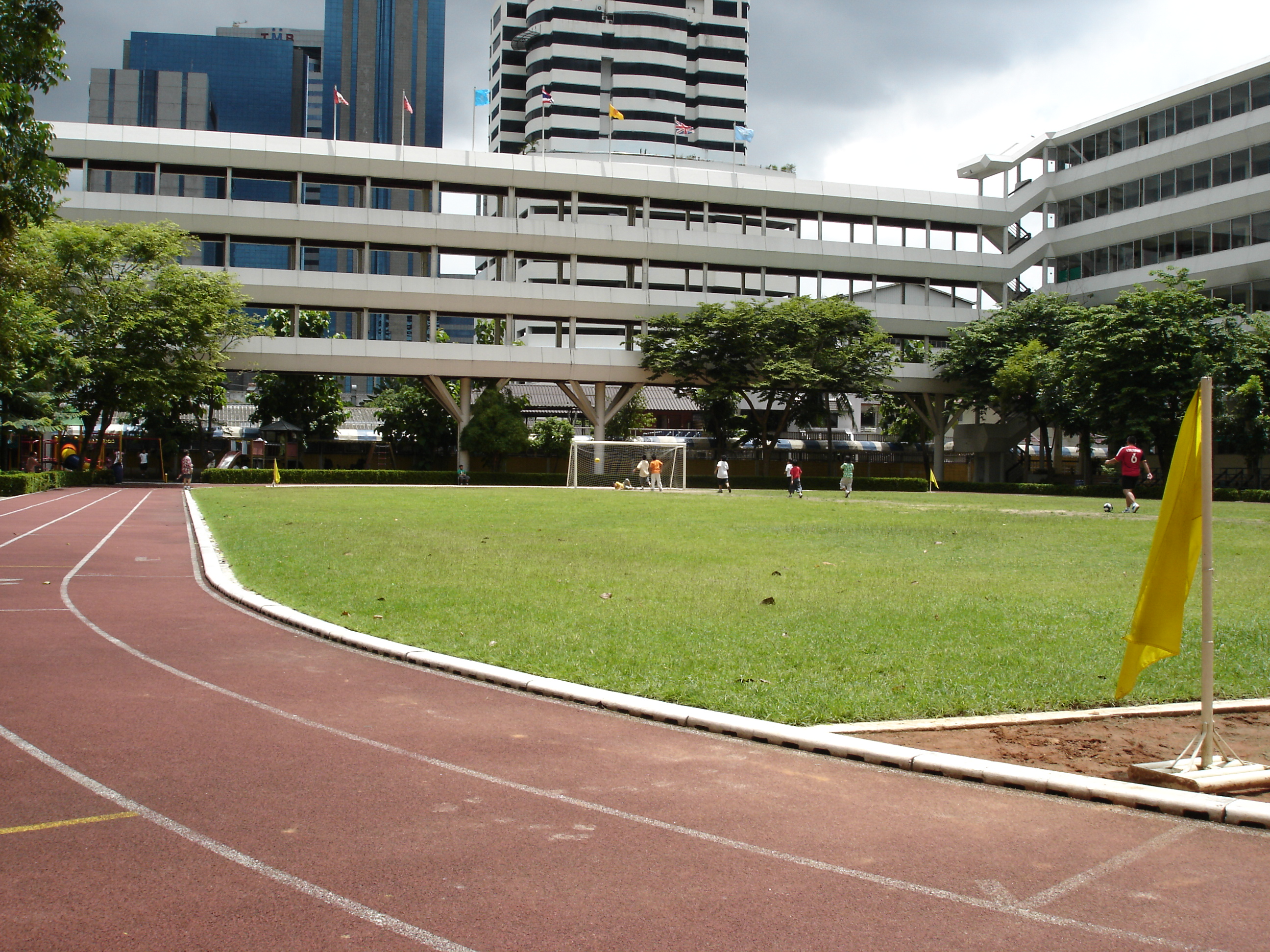

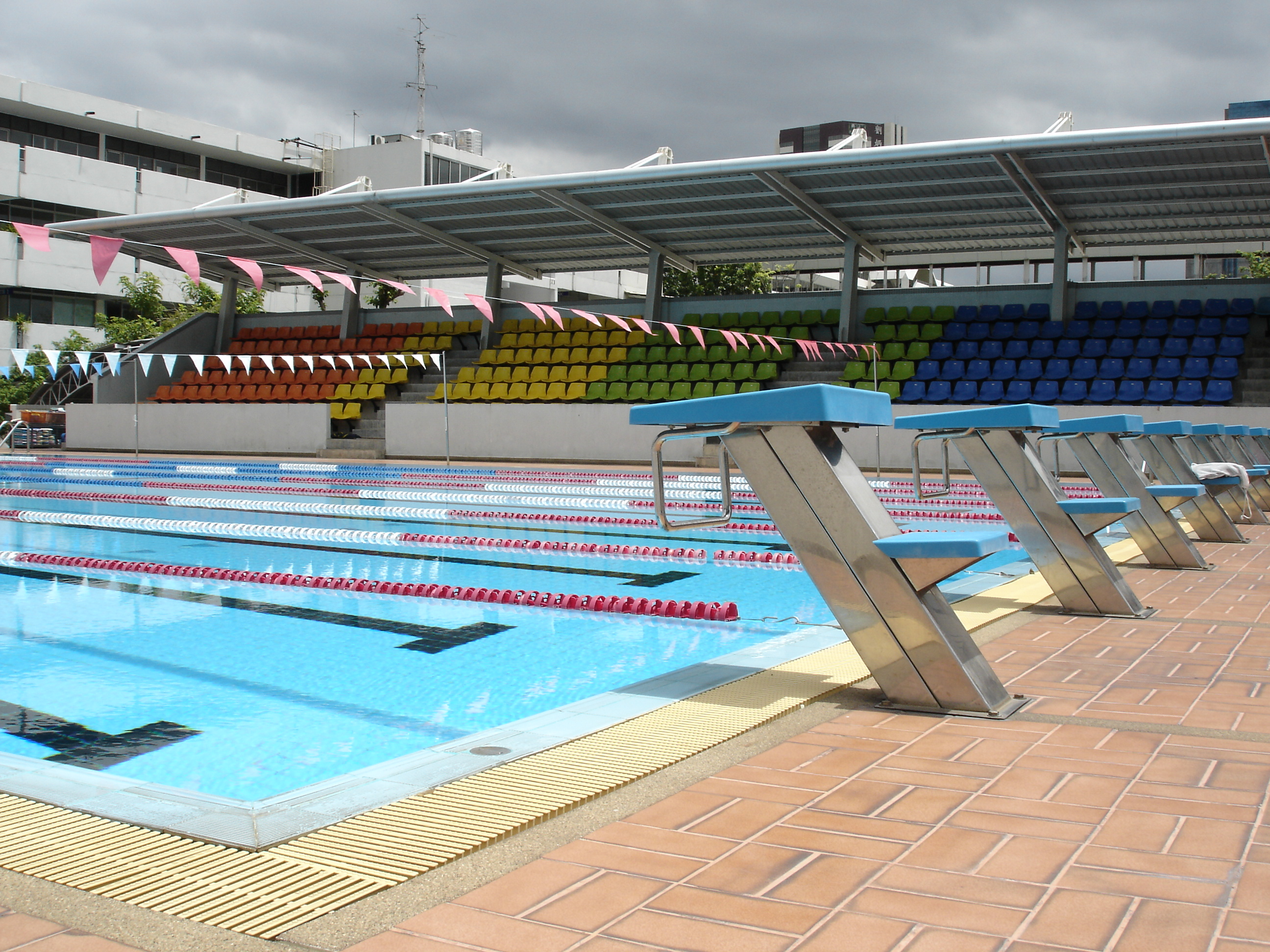

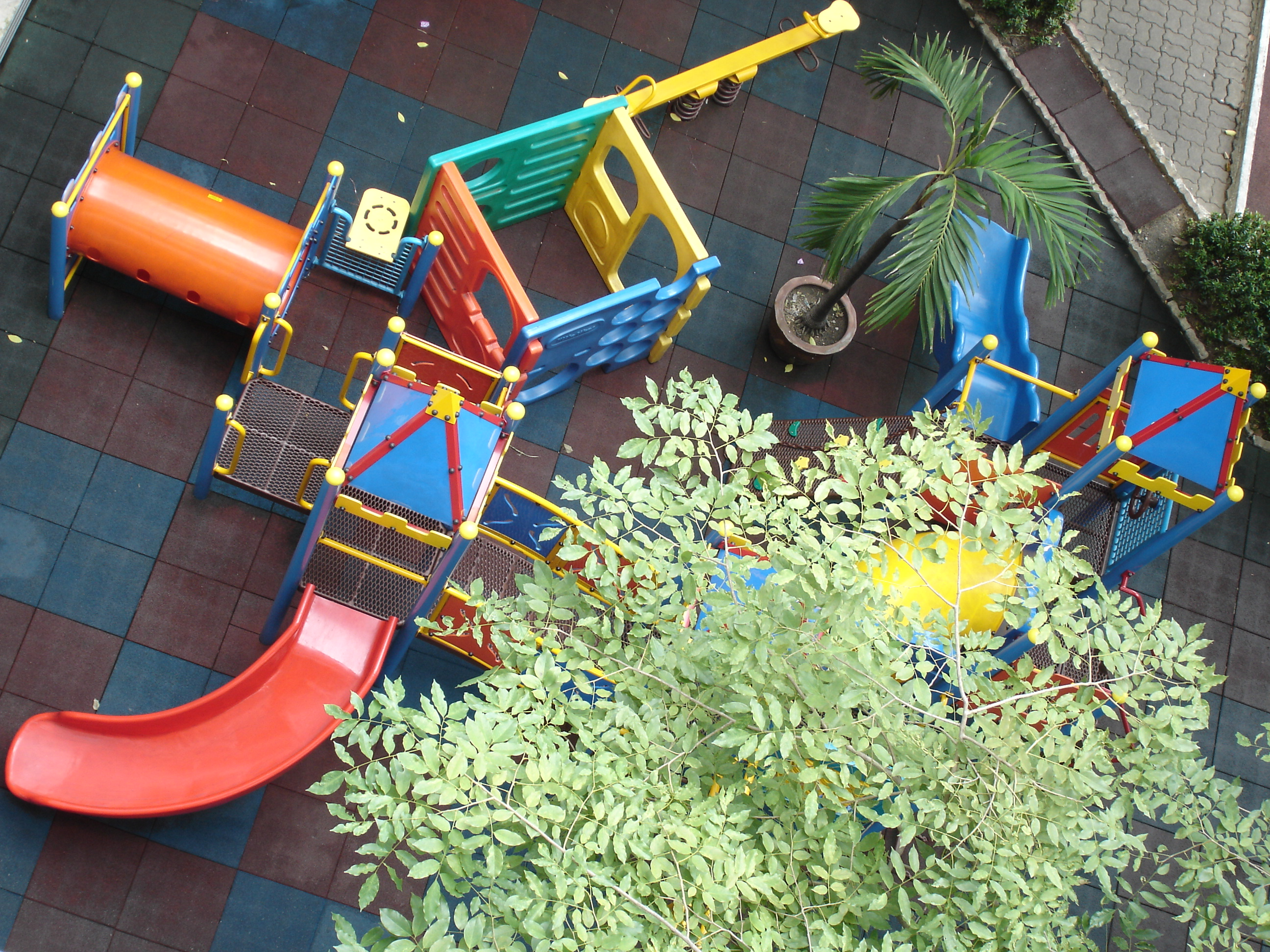
