= Saint John's College =

Saint John's College or variations may refer to:

== Australia ==
- St John's College, University of Queensland, a residential college on the St Lucia campus of the university
- St John's College, University of Sydney, a Roman Catholic residential college of the university
- St John's College, Darwin, a Roman Catholic secondary school in the Northern Territory
- Saint John's College, Whyalla, formerly a Roman Catholic secondary school in South Australia
- St John's College, Woodlawn, a Roman Catholic secondary school, near Lismore, New South Wales
- St John's Anglican College, Brisbane, an Anglican primary and secondary school in the Forest Lake suburb, Queensland
- St John's Regional College, is a Roman Catholic secondary school in Dandenong, Victoria
- St John's Theological College, Melbourne, a former Anglican theological college in Melbourne, Victoria
- St John's College, Morpeth, a former Anglican theological college originally in Armidale and then Morpeth, New South Wales
- St John's Theological College, Perth, a former Anglican theological college in Perth, Western Australia

== Canada ==
- St. John's College (Brantford), a Roman Catholic high school in Ontario
- St. John's College, Manitoba, an Anglican college of the University of Manitoba
- St. John's College, University of British Columbia, a residential college of the university

== India ==
- St John's College, Anchal, a college affiliated to the University of Kerala
- St. John's College, Agra, a college affiliated to Dr. Bhim Rao Ambedkar University
- St. John's Medical College, a private college and hospital in Bangalore

== Ireland ==
- St. John's College, Waterford, formerly a Roman Catholic seminary for the diocese of Waterford and Lismore
- St. John's Central College, a further education college in Cork
- St John's College De La Salle, a Roman Catholic secondary school in Ballyfermot, Dublin

== New Zealand ==
- St John's College, Auckland, an Anglican theological college
- St John's College, Hamilton, a Catholic school
- St John's College, Hastings, a Catholic school

== South Africa ==
- St John's College (Johannesburg), in Houghton, Johannesburg

== Sri Lanka ==
- St. John's College, Colombo, a provincial council school
- St. John's College, Jaffna, a private secondary school in Jaffna
- St. John's College, Nugegoda, a boys' school
- St. John's College, Panadura, a national school

== United Kingdom ==
- St John's College, Battersea, (1840 until 1923), a teacher training college in Battersea, London
- St John's College, Cambridge, a college at Cambridge University, England
- St John's College, Cardiff, an independent co-educational day school in Cardiff, Wales
- St John's College, Durham, a college at Durham University, England
- St John's College, Nottingham, a Church of England theological college in Bramcote, Nottingham, England
- St John's College, Oxford, a college at Oxford University, England
- St John's College, Portsmouth, an independent day and boarding school in Southsea, Hampshire, England
- St John's College, St Andrews, original foundation of St. Mary's College of the University of St. Andrews, Scotland, 1418–1527
- St John's College, York, now part of York St John University

== United States ==
- St. John's College (Annapolis/Santa Fe), one college with campuses in Annapolis, Maryland and Santa Fe, New Mexico, noted for its "Great Books" curriculum
- St. John's College, Cleveland, (known as the Sisters' College, 1928–1947), a Catholic school for teachers and nurses operating until 1975; also
- St. John's College (Cleveland), another school of the same name founded in Cleveland, Ohio, in 1854; defunct
- St. John's College High School, in Washington, DC, known as St. John's College from 1887 until 1921
- St. John's College (Kansas), a four-year college in Winfield, Kansas that closed in 1986
- St. John's College, in New York, now St. John's University (New York City)
- St. John's College (or Seminary), now the College of Saint Benedict and Saint John's University in Collegeville, Minnesota
- St. Johns' College (Arkansas) (1859–1882) in Little Rock, Arkansas
- St. John's Seminary (California), in Camarillo, California
- Saint John's Seminary (Massachusetts), in Brighton, Massachusetts
- St. John's College (1841 until 1907) in the Bronx, New York; the progenitor of Fordham University
- St. John's College (Toledo, Ohio), Toledo, Ohio (1898–c. 1935)

== Other locations ==
- St. John's College, Belize, five educational institutions under the same management in Belize City, Belize
- St John's College, Fiji, a Roman Catholic secondary school in Cawaci
- St. John's University, Shanghai, founded as St. John's College
- St. John's College, University of Hong Kong, a residential college at the University of Hong Kong
- St. John's College (Harare), a private high school in Harare, Zimbabwe

== See also ==
- Saint John's University (disambiguation)
- St. John's Academy (disambiguation)
- St. John's High School (disambiguation)
- Saint John's (disambiguation)
- St. John's Seminary (disambiguation)
