= St. John's Preparatory School =

St. John's Preparatory School may refer to:

- St. John's Preparatory School (Harare), Zimbabwe
- St. John's Preparatory School (Massachusetts)
- Saint John's Preparatory School (Minnesota)
- St. John's Preparatory School (Queens), New York
