= St. John's Hospital =

St. John's Hospital, or St. John's Medical Center, or similar, may refer to:

== Belgium ==
- Old St. John's Hospital, Bruges

== China ==
- St. John Hospital (Hong Kong), Cheung Chau, Hong Kong

== India ==
- St. John's Medical College, Bangalore

== Ireland ==
- St. John's Hospital, Limerick, County Limerick
- St. John's Hospital (Sligo), County Sligo
- St. John's Hospital (Enniscorthy), County Wexford

== Israel ==
- Saint John Eye Hospital Group, Jerusalem

== Portugal ==
- St John's Hospital (Hospital de São João), Porto

== United Kingdom ==
- St John's Hospital, Livingston, Scotland
- St John's Hospital, Bracebridge Heath, Lincolnshire, England
- St John's Hospital, Bath, Somerset, England
- Hospital of St John and St Elizabeth, St John's Wood, London
- St John's Hospital, Stone, Buckinghamshire, England
- Hospital of St John Baptist without the Barrs, Lichfield, England

== United States ==
- Saint John's Health Center, Santa Monica, California
- St. John's Episcopal Hospital South Shore, Queens, New York
- St. John's Hospital Camarillo, Camarillo, California
- St. John's Regional Medical Center (California), Oxnard, California
- St. John's Riverside Hospital, Yonkers, New York
- St. John's Hospital (Springfield, Illinois)
- Ascension St. John Hospital, Detroit, Michigan
- St. John's Hospital (Maplewood, Minnesota)
- St. John's Regional Medical Center (Missouri), Joplin, Missouri
- University Hospitals St. John Medical Center, Westlake, Ohio
- St. John Medical Center, Tulsa, Oklahoma
- St. John's Health, Jackson, Wyoming

=== Defunct ===
- St. John's Episcopal Hospital, Brooklyn, New York
- St John's Queens (Elmhurst, Queens, NY), New York City. Closed in 2009
