= St Johns, New Zealand =

St Johns
- Suburb
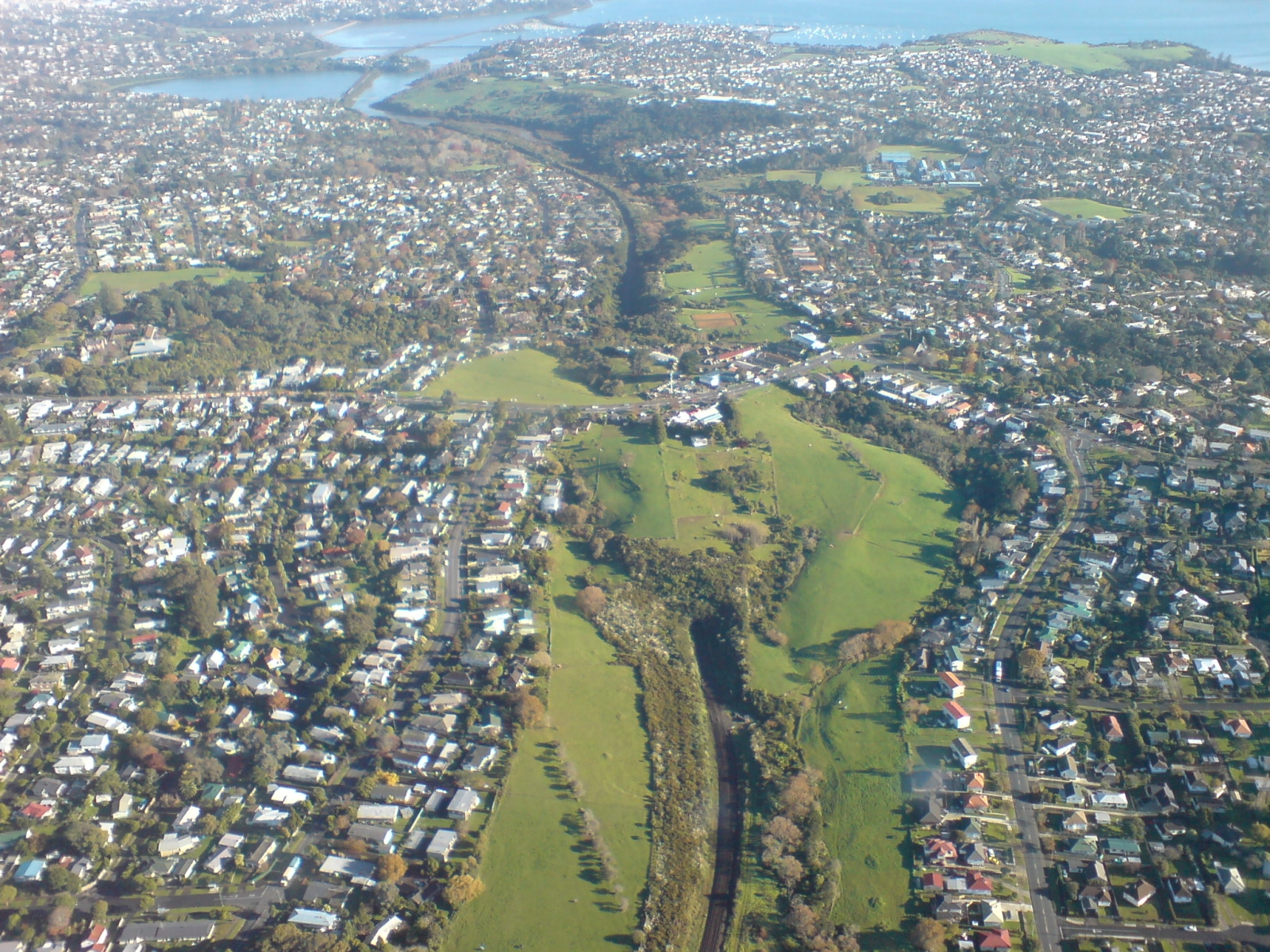
- St Johns, in the foreground and left.
- Interactive map of St Johns
- Coordinates: 36°52′28″S 174°50′33″E
- Country: New Zealand
- City: Auckland
- Local authority: Auckland Council
- Electoral ward: Ōrākei ward; Maungakiekie-Tāmaki ward
- Local board: Ōrākei Local Board

Area
  - Land: 165 ha (410 acres)

Population (June 2025)
  - Total: 6,160
  - Density: 3,730/km^{2} (9,670/sq mi)

Meadowbank (1.9 km)	Kohimarama (2.0 km)	St Heliers (3.0 km)
Remuera (3.9 km)	St Johns	Glen Innes (1.8 km)
Ellerslie (3.6 km)	Stonefields (1.5 km)	Panmure-Glen Innes industrial area (1.5 km)

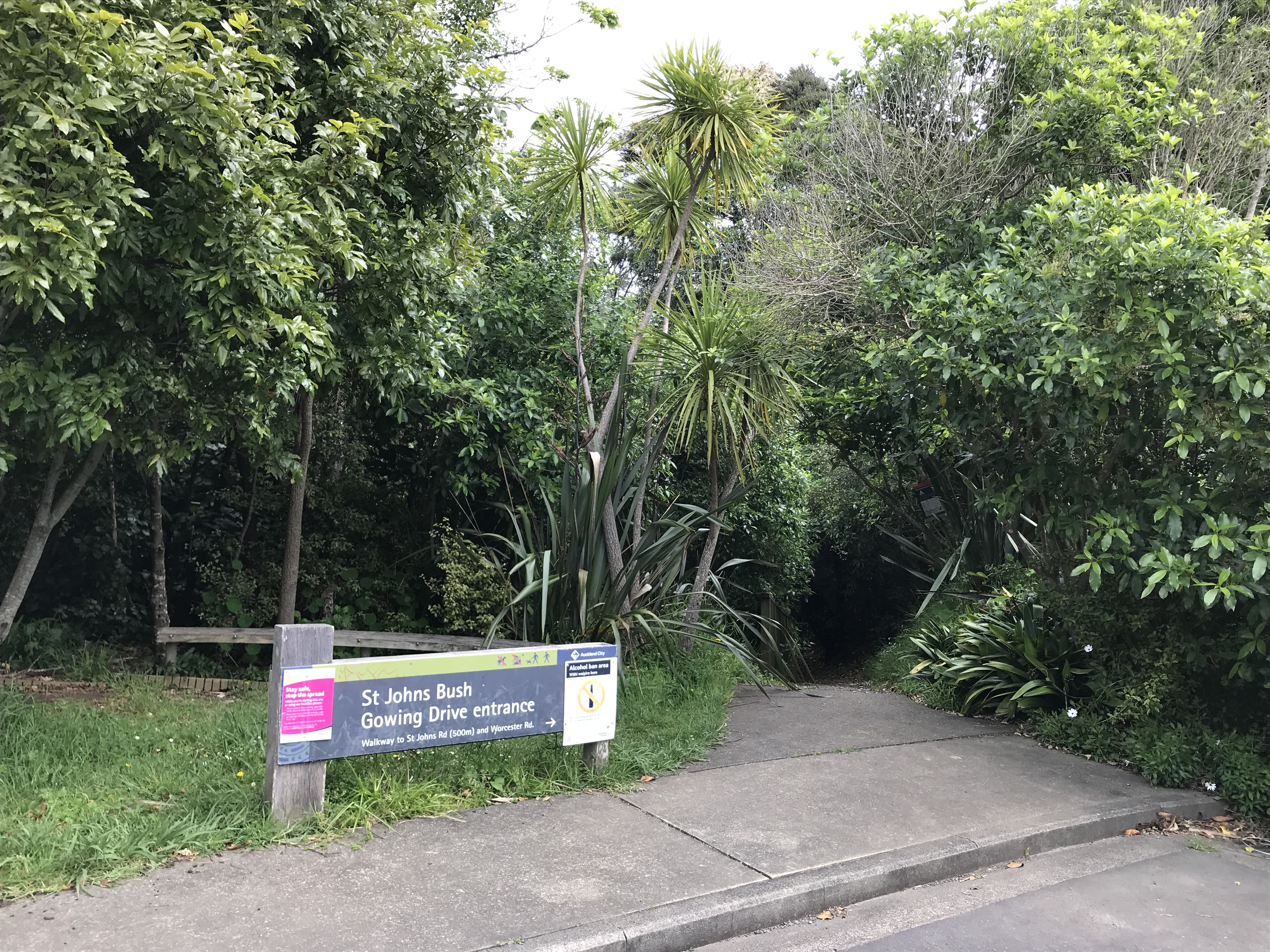
St John's Bush

St Johns is a suburb in Auckland, New Zealand.

The suburb was named after St John's College, a religious training college established in what became the suburb in 1844 by Bishop Selwyn. The College of St John the Evangelist is the theological college of the Anglican Church in New Zealand and Polynesia. The complex of buildings occupies the crest of the hill and once commanded expansive views of the harbour to the north. The earliest buildings from the 1840s are the work of Frederick Thatcher, Bishop Selwyn's primary architect. Thatcher is largely responsible for what is now referred to as the "Selwyn Style"; wooden gothic buildings based on Saxon examples, primarily Greensted Church, in the small village of Greensted in Essex. These structures tend to have pronounced exposed wooden beams on the exterior, gabled 60-degree-pitch roofs and lancet windows.

To the south of Remuera Road lies Waiatarua Reserve. This is a natural basin, prone to seasonal flooding. On several 19th-century maps this was shown as a lake and referred to as 'Lake Remuera', 'Lake St John' or 'Lake Waiatarua' although in reality it was largely an area of swampy ground in which a sheet of shallow water would appear sporadically in the wet season. In 1918, 133 acres (54 hectares) of this land was given to the City Council to create Waiatarua Reserve. As the surrounding farm land was transformed into suburban housing this area became problematic - although in theory the "lake" afforded a picturesque view for the new houses but as it wasn't constantly present it couldn't really be used as a selling feature like Lake Pupuke on the North Shore. Conversely it was a breeding ground for mosquitoes and a source of smells as the basin was composed of a peat-like substance subject to smouldering fires which were difficult to put out. In 1929, a drain was bored through the hill to the south west enabling the water to be drained into the adjacent natural stream which feeds into the nearby Ōrākei Basin; this drainage system is still in place.

In 1934, 50 acres (20 hectares) of the park were leased to the Remuera Golf Club and a course was laid out. The clubhouse was completed in 1935. In 1938 a new course was built around the original layout in response to members’ complaints about the course conditions. In 1968 the course was redesigned by golf course specialist Harold Babbage and a new club house was built.

Much of the suburb was developed in the 1960s and 70s when at that time it was seen as a popular place for families to live. The area is part of the zoning for Selwyn College, the local state secondary school. The nearby St John's Bush is a small chunk of remaining bush.

== Demographics ==
Saint Johns covers 1.65 km^{2} (0.64 sq mi) and had an estimated population of 6,160 as of June 2025, with a population density of 3,733 people per km^{2}.

Historical population
Year	Pop.	±% p.a.
2006	5,442	—
2013	5,496	+0.14%
2018	5,916	+1.48%
2023	5,760	−0.53%

Saint Johns had a population of 5,760 in the 2023 New Zealand census, a decrease of 156 people (−2.6%) since the 2018 census, and an increase of 264 people (4.8%) since the 2013 census. There were 2,820 males, 2,916 females and 30 people of other genders in 2,058 dwellings. 3.5% of people identified as LGBTIQ+. There were 984 people (17.1%) aged under 15 years, 1,143 (19.8%) aged 15 to 29, 2,703 (46.9%) aged 30 to 64, and 927 (16.1%) aged 65 or older.

People could identify as more than one ethnicity. The results were 51.2% European (Pākehā); 7.6% Māori; 6.3% Pasifika; 40.2% Asian; 5.0% Middle Eastern, Latin American and African New Zealanders (MELAA); and 2.0% other, which includes people giving their ethnicity as "New Zealander". English was spoken by 93.6%, Māori language by 1.8%, Samoan by 1.0%, and other languages by 37.7%. No language could be spoken by 2.1% (e.g. too young to talk). New Zealand Sign Language was known by 0.2%. The percentage of people born overseas was 49.7, compared with 28.8% nationally.

Religious affiliations were 34.7% Christian, 4.7% Hindu, 1.8% Islam, 0.7% Māori religious beliefs, 3.8% Buddhist, 0.3% New Age, 1.1% Jewish, and 1.6% other religions. People who answered that they had no religion were 45.5%, and 6.2% of people did not answer the census question.

Of those at least 15 years old, 2,166 (45.4%) people had a bachelor's or higher degree, 1,668 (34.9%) had a post-high school certificate or diploma, and 942 (19.7%) people exclusively held high school qualifications. 948 people (19.8%) earned over $100,000 compared to 12.1% nationally. The employment status of those at least 15 was that 2,649 (55.5%) people were employed full-time, 618 (12.9%) were part-time, and 114 (2.4%) were unemployed.

Individual statistical areas
Name	Area (km^{2})	Population	Density (per km^{2})	Dwellings	Median age	Median income
Saint Johns West	1.04	2,973	2,859	999	42.6 years	$49,500
Saint Johns East	0.61	2,787	4,569	1,059	35.3 years	$52,800
New Zealand					38.1 years	$41,500
