= Binney =

Binney is surname of Scottish origin. Notable people with the surname include:

- Amos Binney (1803–1847), American physician, malacologist and father of William G. Binney
- Constance Binney (1896–1989), American stage and film actress and dancer
- David Binney (born 1961), saxophonist and composer
- Don Binney (1940–2012), New Zealand painter
- Edward William Binney (1812–1882), English geologist
- Edwin Binney (1866–1934), inventor of the Crayola crayon
- Fred Binney (born 1946), English former professional footballer
- George Binney (Sir Frederick George Binney; 1900–1972), British arctic explorer
- Hibbert Binney (1819–1887), Canadian Church of England bishop
- Horace Binney (1780–1875), American lawyer
- Hugh Binney (Admiral Sir Thomas Hugh Binney; 1883–1953), British naval officer and administrator
- James Binney (born 1950), British astrophysicist
- James Binney (cricketer) (1885–1978), born Edgar James Binney, Australian cricketer
- Jonathan Binney (1723–1807), merchant, judge and political figure in Nova Scotia
- Dame Judith Binney (1940–2011) New Zealand historian
- Marcus Binney (born 1944), British architectural historian and author
- Roy Keith Binney (1886-1957), New Zealand architect
- Thomas Binney (1798–1874), English Congregationalist
- William G. Binney (1833–1909), American malacologist
- William Binney (U.S. intelligence official) (born 1943), American intelligence official and NSA whistleblower

== See also ==
- Binney & Burnham, an American automobile built in Boston from 1901 to 1902.
- Binney & Smith, a former name for Crayola LLC, an American company for marking utensils
- Binney, Illinois, an unincorporated community, United States
