= Ōrākei (disambiguation) =

Ōrākei is a suburb in Auckland, New Zealand.

Ōrākei or Orakei may also refer to:

- Ngāti Whātua-o-Ōrākei or Ngāti Whātua Ōrākei, a Māori tribal group
- Ōrākei Basin, a volcano in the Auckland Volcanic Field
- Ōrākei (local board area), an Auckland local board area
  - Ōrākei Local Board, an Auckland local board
  - Ōrākei Ward, an Auckland Council ward
- Ōrākei railway station, an Auckland railway station

== See also ==
- Orakei Korako, a geothermal area in the Taupo Volcanic Area
