= 2022–2025 term of the Auckland Council =

Term of Auckland local government

←	2019–2022 (4th)	2025–2028 (6th)	→
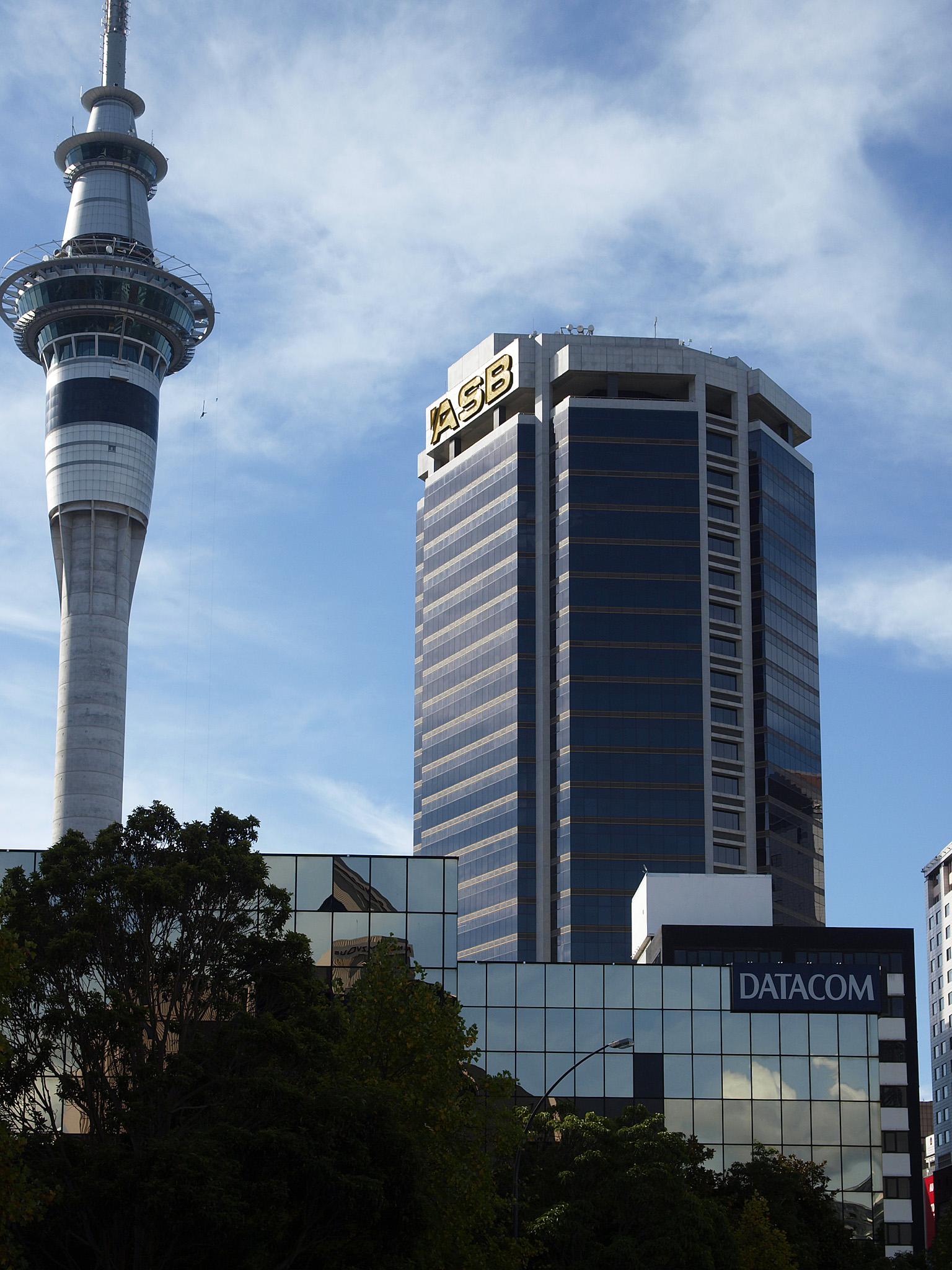
- The council headquarters is in the former ASB building

Overview
- Legislative body: Auckland Council
- Jurisdiction: Auckland Region
- Term: 28 October 2022 – present
- Website: aucklandcouncil.govt.nz

Auckland Council
- Members: 1 mayor; 20 councillors
- Mayor: Wayne Brown (Ind.)
- Deputy: Desley Simpson (Ind.) (Note: Previously a member of Communities and Residents before late 2024)
- Party control: No majority control

Local boards
- Members: 150

The 2022–2025 triennium is the current and fifth term of the Auckland Council, a territorial authority that governs the Auckland Region of New Zealand. It was elected in the 2022 Auckland Council elections held on 8 October, and the mayor and councillors were sworn in on 28 October.

== Events ==
=== 2022 ===
- 8 October: Preliminary election results released; Brown leads as mayor by over 50,000 votes.
- 8 October: Auckland Transport chair Adrienne Young-Cooper resigns following election of Brown, who said he would replace all directors of major council-controlled agencies.
- 15 October: Final election results released; Brown wins the mayoralty.
- 20 October: Mayor-elect Brown meets with Prime Minister Jacinda Ardern.
- 27 October: Mayor-elect Brown announces Desley Simpson will be his deputy, saying she was "overwhelmingly" supported by the incoming council members.
- 28 October: Mayor and councillors sworn in.
- 5 December: Far-right Canadian activists Stefan Molyneux and Lauren Southern's appeal of event cancellation at council-owned venue is dismissed by the Supreme Court.
- 5 December: Mayor Brown proposes 4.5% rate rise, a rate that would be below inflation.
- 10 December: Mayor Brown earmarks $414k for advisors, in line with previous spending; he earlier pledged to cut executive salaries whilst campaigning for office.
- 22 December: Mayor Brown delivers letter to various council-controlled organisations, outlining expectations related to greater transparency.

=== 2023 ===
- 27 January–2 February: Severe flooding in Auckland after heavy rainfall across the upper North Island.
- 12 February: Cyclone Gabrielle reaches Auckland as a subtropical storm, worsening flooding.
- March 23: The council votes (Note: For: Mike Lee, Daniel Newman, Greg Sayers, Desley Simpson, Sharon Stewart, Ken Turner, Wayne Walker, Maurice Williamson, John Watson and Mayor Brown Against: Andy Baker, Josephine Bartley, Angela Dalton, Chris Darby, Julie Fairey, Alf Filipina, Loti Fuli, Shane Henderson, Richard Hills and Kerrin Leoni.) to leave Local Government New Zealand, in a split 10-10 decision with Mayor Brown casting the tie-breaking vote.
- April–October: Council rolls out food scrap bins across the region, with mixed reactions from Aucklanders.

=== 2024 ===
- 14 January: Central government cancels the Auckland Light Rail project.
- 21 February: Former councillor and 2022 mayoral race runner-up Efeso Collins dies following charity run.
- 4 July: The council voted 18–3 (Note: For: Andy Baker, Josephine Bartley, Wayne Brown, Angela Dalton, Chris Darby, Julie Fairey, Alf Filipaina, Christine Fletcher, Lotu Fuli, Shane Henderson, Richard Hills, Kerrin Leoni, Daniel Newman, Greg Sayers, Desley Simpson, Wayne Walker, John Watson, (+ Billy Brown (Note: Houkura members rather than councillors)) Against: Sharon Stewart, Ken Turner, Maurice Williamson Absent: Mike Lee) to oppose the government's increases to road speed limits.
- 9 November: Mayor Brown releases his draft of Mayoral Proposal for the Annual Plan 2025-26, confirming plans for Auckland Transport to be brought back under council control.
- 4 December: The council sold for $1.31 billion the remaining shares it owned in Auckland International Airport Limited as part of the council's long-term plan.
- 19 December: The council voted 11–8 (Note: For: Josephine Bartley, Chris Darby, Julie Fairey, Alf Filipaina, Lotu Fuli, Shane Henderson, Richard Hills, Kerrin Leoni, Desley Simpson, (+ Edward Ashby, Tau Henare) Against: Andy Baker, Mike Lee, Daniel Newman, Sharon Stewart, Ken Turner, Wayne Walker, John Watson, Maurice Williamson Abstained: Christine Fletcher Absent: Wayne Brown, Greg Sayers, Andy Dalton) to oppose the Government's Treaty Principles Bill.

=== 2025 ===
- 27 March: Council approves redevelopment of Eden Park, estimating an expense of $110 million. The alternative (a billion-dollar stadium on the waterfront) was not chosen.
- 27 March: Council approves funding levies for various amenities; Motat was given $19.6 million.

== Composition ==
=== Mayor ===
Two-term incumbent mayor Phil Goff did not stand for re-election, with the 2022 race for mayor seeing the centre-right Wayne Brown face off against the centre-left Efeso Collins (endorsed by Labour and the Greens), with Brown winning by more than 54,000. The election of Brown saw the super city's first right wing mayor since its inception in 2010.

Tim Murphy of Newsroom described Brown as an "anti-establishment" candidate, with Brown himself stating that his election "sent the clearest possible message to Auckland Council, and central government in Wellington." Brown said that transport was the number one issue, followed by crime, unfinished projects, over regulation, and council spending.

Mayor	Affiliation	Political lean	Elected	Deputy
Wayne Brown	Fix Auckland	Right-leaning	2022	Desley Simpson

=== Councillors ===
A right ward shift was noted in the council following the 2022 elections, not only with the election of the right-leaning Wayne Brown as mayor. Eight new councillors were elected, with Julie Fairey, Lotu Fuli, and Kerrin Leoni being the new left wing faces and Andy Baker, Maurice Williamson, Ken Turner, and Mike Lee being the new councillors from the right. Many of the new right wing councillors ran on "reining in" council spending, including former National MP Maurice Williamson.

Ward	Councillor	Affiliation (Note: at the 2022 local elections, unless indicated otherwise.)	Political lean	Elected
Albany	John Watson	Putting People First	Right-leaning	2016
Albany	Wayne Walker	Putting People First	Right-leaning	2010
Albert-Eden-Puketāpapa	Christine Fletcher	Communities and Residents	Right-leaning	2010
Albert-Eden-Puketāpapa	Julie Fairey	City Vision	Left-leaning	2022
Franklin	Andy Baker	Team Franklin	Right-leaning	2022
Howick	Sharon Stewart	Independent	Right-leaning	2010
Howick	Maurice Williamson	Independent	Right-leaning	2022
Manukau	Lotu Fuli	Labour	Left-leaning	2022
Manukau	Alf Filipaina	Labour	Left-leaning	2010
Manurewa-Papakura	Angela Dalton	None	Left-leaning	2019
Manurewa-Papakura	Daniel Newman	Manurewa-Papakura Action Team	Right-leaning	2016
Maungakiekie-Tāmaki	Josephine Bartley	Labour	Left-leaning	2018
North Shore	Chris Darby	For the Shore	Left-leaning	2013
North Shore	Richard Hills	A Positive Voice for the Shore	Left-leaning	2016
Ōrākei	Desley Simpson	Independent (since late 2024)	Right-leaning	2016
Ōrākei	Desley Simpson	Communities and Residents (2022–2024)	Right-leaning	2016
Rodney	Greg Sayers	Independent	Right-leaning	2016
Waitākere	Shane Henderson	Labour	Left-leaning	2019
Waitākere	Ken Turner	WestWards	Right-leaning	2022
Waitematā and Gulf	Mike Lee	Auckland Independents	Right-leaning	2022
Whau	Kerrin Leoni	Labour	Left-leaning	2022
