= Remuera =

- Suburb
- Interactive map of Remuera
- Coordinates: 36°52′50″S 174°47′53″E
- Country: New Zealand
- City: Auckland
- Local authority: Auckland Council
- Electoral ward: Ōrākei ward
- Local board: Ōrākei Local Board

Area
  - Land: 1,011 ha (2,500 acres)

Population (June 2025)
  - Total: 27,810
  - Density: 2,751/km^{2} (7,124/sq mi)
- Train stations: Remuera Railway Station

Parnell	(Hobson Bay)	Ōrākei
Epsom, Newmarket	Remuera	Meadowbank, St. Johns
Greenlane	Ellerslie	Mount Wellington

Remuera is a suburb in Auckland, New Zealand. It is located four kilometres southeast of the city centre. Remuera is characterised by many large houses, often Edwardian or mid 20th century. A prime example of a "leafy" suburb, Remuera is noted for its quiet tree-lined streets. The suburb has numerous green spaces, most obvious of which is Ōhinerau / Mount Hobson – a volcanic cone with views from the top overlooking Waitematā Harbour and Rangitoto.

The suburb extends from Hobson Bay and the Ōrākei Basin on the Waitematā Harbour to the north and east, to the main thoroughfare of State Highway 1 in the southwest. It is surrounded by the suburbs of Ōrākei, Meadowbank, Saint Johns, Mount Wellington, Ellerslie, Greenlane, Epsom, Newmarket and Parnell. Remuera has been home to many well-known New Zealanders, including the late Sir Edmund Hillary and the race car driver Bruce McLaren.

== History ==
The area was attractive to Tāmaki Māori as much of the Auckland isthmus was devoid of trees and covered only in native flax, bracken and scrub. Remuera was different, having patches of woodland which were the habitat of many birds suitable for trapping while the adjacent harbour and basins were good fishing areas. Remuera Road was firstly a walking track, connecting the eastern and northern sections of the Auckland isthmus.

John Logan Campbell describes early 19th century Remuera in his book Poenamo:

Beautiful was Remuera's shore, sloping gently to Waitemata's sunlit waters in the days of which I write. The palm fern-tree was there with its crown of graceful bending fronds and black feathery-looking young shoots; and the karaka, with its brilliantly-polished green leaves and golden-yellow fruit, contrasting with the darker crimped and varnished leaf of the puriri, with its bright cherrylike berry. Evergreen shrubs grew on all sides, of every shade from palest to deepest green; lovely flowering creepers mounted high overhead, leaping from tree to tree and hanging in rich festoons; of beautiful ferns there was a profusion underfoot. The tui, with his grand rich note made the wood musical; the great fat stupid pigeon cooed down upon you almost within reach, nor took the trouble to fly away.

— John Logan Campbell

The suburb is named after a pā (fortification) named Remuwera, on Ōhinerau / Mount Hobson. Remu-wera literally translates to "burnt edge of kilt", commemorating the occasion where a chieftainess of Hauraki was allegedly captured and consumed. Although the most common definition in reference literature, the accuracy of this definition has been described as "highly doubtful".

Around 1741, Te Wai-o-Hua iwi was driven away by the Ngāti Whātua and Te Taoū iwi. Later, these iwi merged with Te Roroa and Te Uri-o-Hau into Ngāti Whātua-o-Ōrākei, which is the main iwi on the Tāmaki isthmus. In May 1844 one of the largest Māori feasts ever held in New Zealand took place in Remuera. It was organised by the Waikato iwi and about 4000 Māori and many Pākehā (Europeans) were present. The festivities lasted for a week and large amounts of food and drinks were served: 11,000 baskets of potatoes, 9,000 sharks, 100 pigs, and large amounts of tea, tobacco and sugar. Governor Robert FitzRoy visited the festivities on 11 May 1844 when a haka was performed by 1,600 Māori, armed with guns and tomahawks.

When the European settlers wanted to buy the land on the Tāmaki isthmus from the Māori, they first declined. But in 1851, Henry Tacy Kemp, an interpreter to the Land Claims Commissioners, bought 700 acres for £5000. Subsequently, more plots of land were sold and put up for public auction. The land was suitable for pasture land and as the town of Auckland was some distance away people did not really start to build houses (as opposed to farmhouses) until the 1860s. One of the early farmer-settlers who bought land at Remuera was Archibald Clark, who became Auckland's first mayor in 1851. Remuera was known as the garden suburb. Remuera was popular with the bourgeoisie as it provided much larger sections than other parts of Auckland. Many grand homes were built in the late 19th and early 20th centuries. By the 1960s smaller sections started being developed.

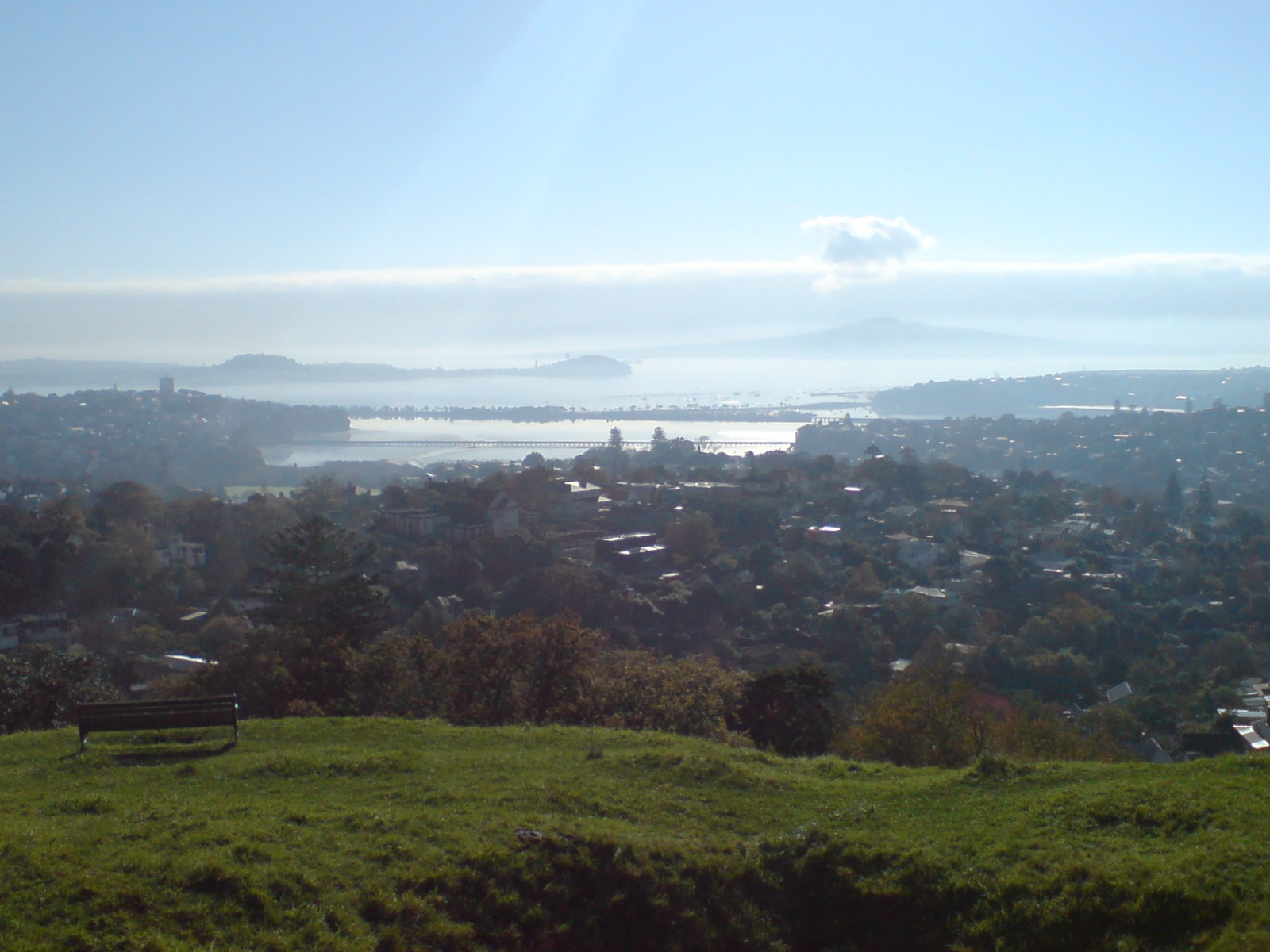
View from Ōhinerau / Mount Hobson across Remuera to Hobson Bay

Smaller suburban houses began appearing in the area nearest Newmarket and began to spread along Remuera Road. The first shops opened in 1890 at the intersection with Victoria Avenue. Railway stations at Newmarket and Market Road encouraged residents to commute to town. Likewise one of the most important routes for the electric tram system created in 1902 was to the Remuera shops, with an extension to the bottom of Victoria Avenue. One of the first businesses was L.J. Keys' grocery store on the Clonbern Road corner, which currently houses a café.

Remuera Road initially began as an unsealed cart track leading from Newmarket to Tāmaki. By the 1860s, the Remuera Road Board was formed to help administer the area surrounding the road, by organising roads, drainage, water and power, and the Remuera District School was established in 1873. In the early 1900s the Auckland electric tramway service began servicing Remuera Road, which led to the district doubling in population between 1901 and 1911 to over 5,000 residents. By the 1910s, ratepayers in the area opposed the Remuera area being administered separately to Auckland. The Remuera Ratepayers Association organised a petition in 1912, which included 791 ratepayers (over 50%) signing to join with the adjacent Auckland City, against the Remuera Road Board's wishes. A commission of inquiry was appointed, which recommended amalgamation. Again the Road Board declined and it was only after the Department of Internal Affairs intervened that the Road Board gave in. The union was ratified in February 1915 and the 2,520 acres of Remuera became part of Auckland. J. Dempsey said that Auckland had received "the brightest jewel in her crown today", although a subsequent report by the city engineer pointed out that Remuera had not been surveyed, it had 60 miles of primitive roading, and lacked proper stormwater drainage, sewerage and other services.

The 1920s and 1930s saw increased development of Remuera, with commercial precincts such as the Avenue Buildings, Coles Building, Hellaby Building and the Skeltons Building allowing the area to act as a commercial hub. The first mile of Remuera Road was concreted in 1921, and the existing tram line was doubled in 1924, followed by an extension of the service to Meadowbank. Auckland City Council embarked on a series of improvements for the new area. One of its first acts was to provide a free public library for the area in 1915, later replaced by the current building in 1926. In 1919 however local residents were incensed by the council's building of public toilets at the Remuera shops that they demanded be torn down.

In 1927 the Remuera rugby league club reformed after initially forming in 1914 when former All Black and Kiwi, George A. Gillett coached the club. A year later in 1928, the Tudor Theatre cinema and dance hall opened, becoming a central part of Remuera social life for decades. The theatre closed in 1973, and after demolition the location became the Tudor Mall in 1980. In 1930, the electric tramway was extended from Remuera to Meadowbank.

In more recent history, the infamous Bassett Road machine gun murders took place in Remuera on 7 December 1963. Two men were shot with a .45 calibre Reising submachine gun at 115 Bassett Road and word quickly spread about a "Chicago-style" gang murder. Two suspects were sentenced to life imprisonment.

== Demographics ==
Remuera covers 10.11 km^{2} (3.90 sq mi) and had an estimated population of 27,810 as of June 2025, with a population density of 2,751 people per km^{2}.

Historical population
Year	Pop.	±% p.a.
2006	24,741	—
2013	26,715	+1.10%
2018	27,252	+0.40%
2023	26,709	−0.40%
The 2006 population is for a smaller area of 9.83 km^{2}. Source:

Remuera had a population of 26,709 in the 2023 New Zealand census, a decrease of 543 people (−2.0%) since the 2018 census, and a decrease of 6 people (−0.0%) since the 2013 census. There were 12,894 males, 13,725 females and 90 people of other genders in 9,477 dwellings. 3.5% of people identified as LGBTIQ+. The median age was 40.7 years (compared with 38.1 years nationally). There were 4,356 people (16.3%) aged under 15 years, 5,754 (21.5%) aged 15 to 29, 11,811 (44.2%) aged 30 to 64, and 4,791 (17.9%) aged 65 or older.

People could identify as more than one ethnicity. The results were 63.2% European (Pākehā); 4.3% Māori; 2.5% Pasifika; 34.5% Asian; 2.6% Middle Eastern, Latin American and African New Zealanders (MELAA); and 1.6% other, which includes people giving their ethnicity as "New Zealander". English was spoken by 94.8%, Māori language by 0.7%, Samoan by 0.3%, and other languages by 31.3%. No language could be spoken by 1.3% (e.g. too young to talk). New Zealand Sign Language was known by 0.3%. The percentage of people born overseas was 41.6, compared with 28.8% nationally.

Religious affiliations were 33.8% Christian, 2.5% Hindu, 1.1% Islam, 0.1% Māori religious beliefs, 2.5% Buddhist, 0.2% New Age, 0.6% Jewish, and 1.2% other religions. People who answered that they had no religion were 53.0%, and 5.2% of people did not answer the census question.

Of those at least 15 years old, 11,769 (52.7%) people had a bachelor's or higher degree, 7,296 (32.6%) had a post-high school certificate or diploma, and 3,294 (14.7%) people exclusively held high school qualifications. The median income was $57,400, compared with $41,500 nationally. 6,045 people (27.0%) earned over $100,000 compared to 12.1% nationally. The employment status of those at least 15 was that 11,472 (51.3%) people were employed full-time, 3,168 (14.2%) were part-time, and 429 (1.9%) were unemployed.

Individual statistical areas
Name	Area (km^{2})	Population	Density (per km^{2})	Dwellings	Median age	Median income
Newmarket Park	0.28	1,248	4,457	579	52.8 years	$54,400
Remuera West	0.88	2,682	3,048	945	40.9 years	$57,900
Remuera Waitaramoa	1.69	3,828	2,265	1,332	42.2 years	$59,100
Remuera North	1.41	3,447	2,445	1,188	41.2 years	$58,800
Remuera South	1.43	3,828	2,677	1,305	38.5 years	$53,400
Remuera Waiata	0.94	2,865	3,048	1,044	47.0 years	$59,300
Remuera East	0.89	2,691	3,024	918	42.1 years	$61,600
Remuera Abbotts Park	1.02	3,732	3,659	1,350	36.5 years	$57,000
Remuera Waiatarua	1.57	2,385	1,519	819	36.5 years	$56,300
New Zealand					38.1 years	$41,500

== Landmarks and features ==
=== Notable buildings and sites ===
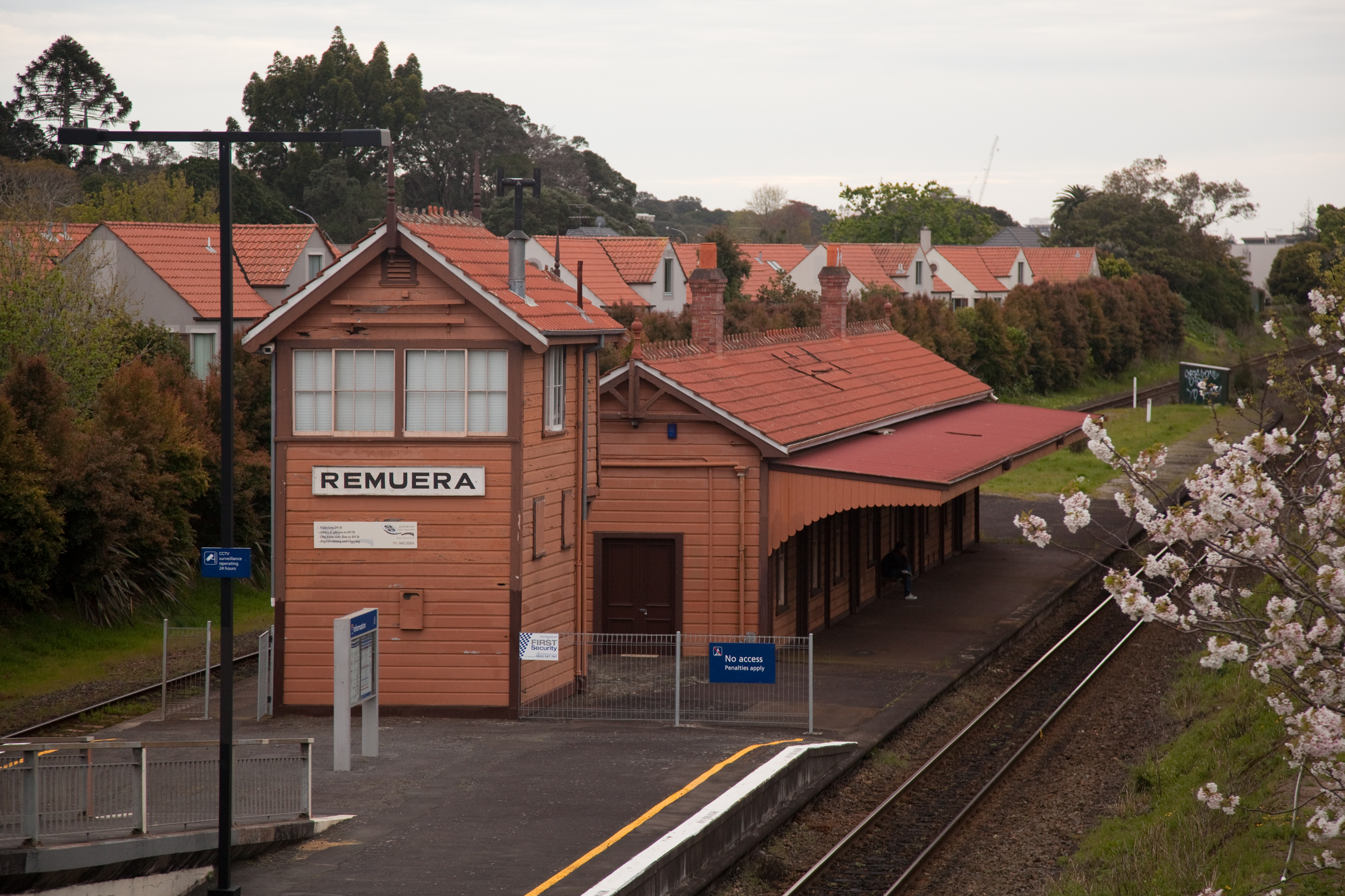
Remuera Train Station

Remuera has several places of historic interest, some of which have been incorporated into the Remuera Heritage Walk.

- St Mark's Anglican Church. This is a Selwyn church (wooden Gothic church) built in the 1860s by Philip Herapath replacing an earlier structure from 1848 by Frederick Thatcher. Consecrated by Bishop Selwyn. John Kinder was minister here at a time when this was a rural parish. Scoriarock foundations.
- St Mark's Graveyard. The first burial was in 1849, and the last in 1963. The names of many well-known early Aucklanders appear here, including James Dilworth.
- Former Remuera Freemasons Hall, Remuera Road. Probably designed by the architect Henry G. Wade, the Hall was consecrated on 9 November 1880, at a ceremony presided over by the Deputy Grand Master of the Auckland Grand Lodge District (E.C.), William Lodder. The Remuera Masonic Hall survives as the oldest purpose-built lodge premises in the former Auckland Grand Lodge District (E.C.). Sold by the Freemasons in 1993.
- Saint Michael's Catholic Church, 6 Beatrice Road. A large Italian Romanesque style church designed by the noted architects Tole and Massey. Opened on 1 October 1933.
- St Luke's Presbyterian Church, Remuera Road. Masonry Gothic church from 1932 replacing an 1874 wooden building. Designed by Francis Drummond Stewart who also designed the Chateau Tongariro (1928). The present church was modeled on the parish kirk in the Scottish mining village of Twechar, built in 1902. Reinforced concrete and brick construction, with an external cladding of Putāruru stone. The foundation stone was laid in 1931 by Miss Sarah Dingwall.
- King's School, 258 Remuera Road. King's College started in 1896 occupying the house called "The Tower", built for David Graham, brother of the founder of Ellerslie, Robert Graham.
- 4 Garden Road. Garden Road was originally the driveway to Number 4, a house designed by prominent architect C. Reginald Ford (of the firm Gummer and Ford)as his own residence. Built in an eclectic architectural mix with French and Italian influences, number 4 later became the "Remuera Ladies College" whose students included Jean Batten.
- Skeltons Building 1928, 339–345 Remuera Road. Built for Robert Skelton, a carrier and one of Remuera's first businessmen. This set of shops retain their original tiled shopfronts.
- Hellaby Building 1926, 357–365 Remuera Road was built for Frederick Hellaby whose family ran a chain of Butcher's shops.
- Remuera Pharmacy, 375–377 Remuera Road. 1909 building for a business operated by Fred Blott.
- Cole's Building, 382–394 Remuera Road. 1923 building; the first tenant was Wylies Pharmacy.
- L.J. Keys’ grocery store. Corner of Clonbern Road – this was the first shop in the area (1907).
- Former Remuera Post Office, cnr Victoria Ave and Remuera Road. Built in 1914 to the designs of the Government Architect John Campbell.
- Brick shops 1929. 411–413 Remuera Road. These two-storey shops replaced the wooden building constructed in 1902 as the Remuera Road Board office, which later became the first Remuera Public Library after the demise of the Board in 1915.
- The Remuera Library. Designed by the Auckland architects Gummer and Ford, the library was built in 1928 in a neo-Georgian style reminiscent of American colonial architecture. Faced with red brick, this building has very fine details, especially around the windows. In 1928, the architects were awarded Gold Medals from the New Zealand Institute of Architects (NZIA) for the design of the building. The building has also won the conservation award in 2004 for the renovations that were done.
- Cotter House, 4 St Vincent Avenue. Built around 1848 for prominent teetotaller Joseph Newman, who died childless at 77 following injuries sustained when a billboard on Queen Street advertising whisky fell on his head. The house was sold to Thomas Cotter, a prominent Auckland solicitor and King's Counsel, whose family owned it until 1926, when the land was further subdivided.
- St Paul's Methodist Church, 12 St Vincent Avenue. Red brick church from 1922.
- Saint Aidan's Anglican Church, 1904 wooden gothic / Arts & Crafts style church noted for its lychgate.
- Elmstone, 468 Remuera Rd. Large Neo-Classical House with Arts&Crafts features built in 1904 for V J Larner.
- Hellaby House, 542 Remuera Rd. Designed in 1921 by Roy Keith Binney for Amy Mary Hellaby.

Other special buildings in Remuera are the Remuera Railway Station and Signal Box. These were built in 1907–1908 and the station is the best preserved in Auckland. Whilst the other stations were regularly modernised, Remuera's has been kept almost in its original state and is still used for suburban passenger trains.

=== Arney Road ===
Arney Road has always been a coveted location due to its location being both near the city and sea shore and providing views of the Hauraki Gulf. In 1906 it was described as:

the most elegant residential thoroughfare in Remuera, being just off the tram line; the residences comprise many of the largest and handsomest in the district, with beautiful grounds, and the road in a graceful sweep leads from the tram line on the high road down to the waterfront in Hobson Bay

The road itself is 20 m (66 ft) wide with large trees lining the berm. The buildings on Arney Road are from the 19th, 20th, and 21st century with seven of these having registration with Heritage New Zealand. Notable buildings along Arney Road include: 9 Arney Road, a large Edwardian home; 11 Arney Road, a category 1 building designed in the Arts and Crafts style; 27 Arney Road, a category 2 building designed in the Arts and Crafts style; 43 Arney Road, St Ann's is a category 2 English country cottage; 51 Arney Road, a neo-Georgian home; 91 Arney Road, Vernon Brown House, a category 1 building and former home of Vernon Brown; 30 Arney Road, Stansfield House, category 2 Arts and Crafts home; 34 Arney Road, Court House, a category 2 neo-Georgian residence; 85 Arney Road, Cox House, category 2 Arts and Crafts house.

=== Nature areas ===
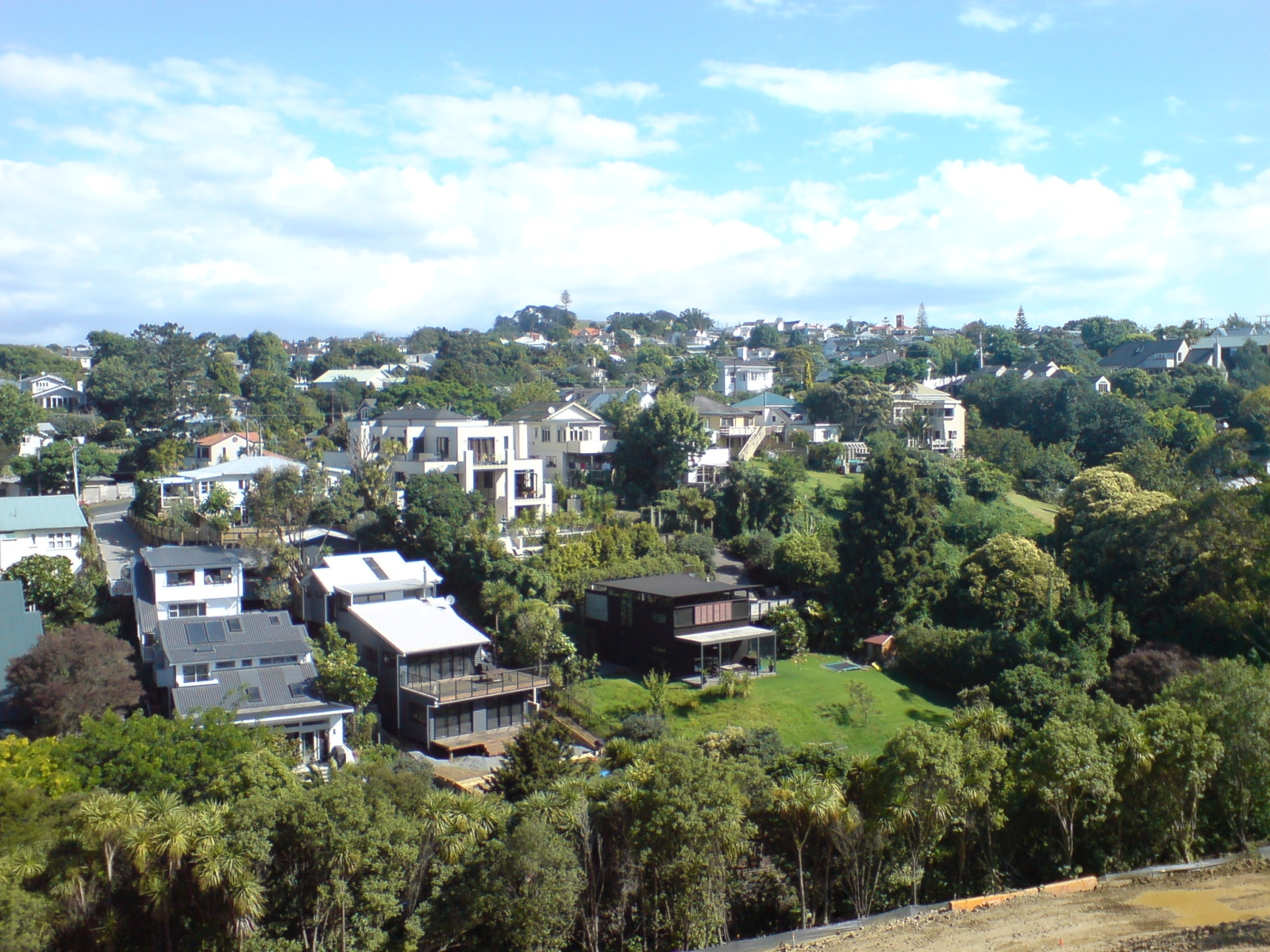
Looking southeast over north Remuera

Remuera includes some interesting nature areas and parks. Unlike the rest of the isthmus of Auckland, which was largely void of large trees and covered with native grass, flax and manuka, Remuera retained patches of native bush and woodland.

The Ōrākei Basin, a tidal lagoon popular for water sport activities, is the submerged crater of a volcano. There is a 3 km public walkway around the basin whereby the flora and fauna of the area can be observed at close hand.

Mount Hobson Domain includes the volcanic cone, previously used as a pā (a defended settlement) by the Māori and in later times as a quarry and pasture land. Ōhinerau / Mount Hobson (143m high) is one of Auckland's better preserved and least modified volcanic cones. Formed some 25,000 years ago, the volcanic hill has a horse-shoe shaped crater opening to the southwest. Terraces and pits are still evident from the Maori occupation. Like the other volcanic hills of the Auckland isthmus, in the 20th century, water reservoirs were built on the summit and the lower southwest side a water reservoir was incorporated into Ōhinerau / Mount Hobson to supply water to the surrounding area. Still evident on the south-east side of the mountain is the concrete base remnant of a WWII medical store for the US Navy Mobile Hospital in nearby Market Rd – a site now occupied by the Dilworth Junior School. As you walk up the path from the entrance, you will soon come to a stone seat – a memorial to Remuera boys who died in WWII. This overlooks a field of jonquils and daffodils which bloom in winter or early spring.

Waiatarua Reserve. To the south of Remuera Road lies Waiatarua Reserve. This is a natural basin, prone to seasonal flooding. On several 19th-century maps this was shown as a lake and referred to as 'Lake Remuera', 'Lake St John' or 'Lake Waiatarua' although in reality it was largely an area of swampy ground in which a sheet of shallow water would appear sporadically in the wet season. In 1918, 133 acres (54 hectares) of this land was given to the City Council to create Waiatarua Reserve. As the surrounding farm land was transformed into suburban housing this area became problematic – although in theory the "lake" afforded a picturesque view for the new houses, it was also a breeding ground for mosquitos. Moreover, the basin was composed of a peat-like substance subject to smouldering fires which were difficult to put out. In 1929 a drain was bored through the hill to the south west enabling the water to be drained into the adjacent natural stream which feeds into the nearby Ōrākei Basin; this drainage system is still in place. In 1934, 50 acres (20 hectares) of the park were leased to the Remuera Golf Club and a course was laid out. The clubhouse was completed in 1935. In 1938 a new course was built around the original layout in response to members’ complaints about the course conditions. In 1968 the Course was redesigned by golf course specialist Harold Babbage and a new Club House built.

== Economy ==
=== Retail ===
The Remuera Town Centre includes Airlie Court, Remuera Mall, Tudor Mall, Victoria Mews Arcade and Remuera Village Green. It has 130 shops including a New World supermarket and has about 400 carparks.

== Education ==
Remuera Intermediate is a coeducational intermediate school (years 7–8) with a roll of 887.

Remuera School, Meadowbank School and Victoria Avenue School are coeducational contributing primary schools (years 1–6) with rolls of 569, 768 and 400 respectively.

Baradene College of the Sacred Heart is a state integrated Catholic girls' secondary school (years 7–13) with a roll of 1,531. St Michael's Catholic School is a coeducational state-integrated contributing primary school (years 1–6) with a roll of 226.

Mount Hobson Middle School is a private coeducational composite school (years 7–10) with a roll of 45.

King's School, St Kentigern Primary School and Saint Kentigern Girls' School are private single-sex full primary schools (years 1–8) with rolls of 761, 658 and 388 respectively.

Kadimah School, a co-educational Jewish primary school (years 0–8) with a roll of 122.

Rolls are as of July 2026.

== Governance ==
The Remuera Road District was formed 13 February 1863 but did not govern the area until 22 August 1867 when it was modified in statute. In 1915 it amalgamated with the City of Auckland.

Remuera is a part of the Epsom electorate for the Parliamentary representation. Local government of Remuera is the responsibility of the Ōrākei Local Board, which also includes the suburbs of Ōrākei, Mission Bay, Kohimarama, St Heliers, Glendowie, St Johns, Meadowbank, and Ellerslie. Remuera is also a part of the Ōrākei ward. Prior to it falling under Epsom, Remuera itself was an electorate from 1938 to 1996.

== Remuera Golf Club ==
The Remuera Golf Club started to develop in 1934 and the club house was finished in 1935. It was not an ideal location for a golf club, as it was established in a natural basin prone to seasonal flooding. In fact on several 19th-century maps this was actually shown as a lake and referred to as 'Lake Remuera' or 'Lake St John' although in reality it was largely an area of swampy ground in which a sheet of shallow water would appear sporadically in the wet season. 133 acres (54 hectares) of land in the gully was given to the city council in 1918 as Waiatarua Reserve. As the surrounding farm land was transformed into suburban housing this area became problematic – although the "lake" afforded a picturesque view for the new houses, it was also a breeding ground for mosquitos. Moreover, the basin was composed of a peat-like substance subject to smouldering fires which were difficult to put out. In 1929 a drain was bored through the hill to the south-west enabling the water to be drained into the adjacent natural stream which feeds into the nearby Oraki Basin; this drainage system is still in place.

Fifty acres of the park were leased to the golf club in 1934 and a course was laid out. In 1938 a new course was built around the original layout in response to members’ complaints about the course conditions. In 1968 the Course was redesigned by golf course specialist Harold Babbage and a new Club House has been built.

== Connections ==
Remuera's reputation as a desirable residential area around the turn of the 20th century was reflected in the use of its name for a luxury liner. SS Remuera was a steamship launched in 1911. She was the last delivered of three 11,000-tonners built by the William Denny Organization between 1909 and 1911 for the New Zealand Shipping Company (sister ships Ruahine and Rotorua). Her inaugural voyage in 1911 was from London to Wellington. In September 1914 she was the first British ship to pass through the newly complete Panama Canal.

During the First War she was commandeered by the British Government. After the war she returned to the UK to New Zealand route, as a sign of the changing times she was now refitted to accommodate two classes of passengers as opposed to her initial layout of First, Second and Steerage. Again commandeered at the outbreak of war in 1939 she was torpedoed in the North Sea in September 1940.

== Notable residents ==
- Jean Batten was a student at a Girls School at 4 Garden Road.
- Archibald Clark – MP (1805–1875) Auckland's first Mayor in 1851.
- James Clark – Mayor of Auckland 1880–1883. Lived at 258 Remuera Road (now King's School).
- William Crowther (1834–1900) – Mayor of Auckland. Horse Tram Company Operator.
- James Dilworth – Served on the Auckland Provincial Council for eight years. He and his wife Isabella left money to create the well known Dilworth School which takes in and educates boys living in straitened circumstances.
- Sir Edmund Hillary (1919–2008) – Mountaineer, explorer and Bee-Keeper. Hillary built a home in Remuera in 1956 where he lived until his death in 2008. His home was removed from its original location in 2010 and stored until moved in 2011 to Sir Edmund Hillary Collegiate in Ōtara where it now houses a training programme for young leaders.
- Sir Paul Holmes (1950–2013)
- Alfred George Horton (1842–1903) – Founder of The New Zealand Herald newspaper.
- Dame Rosie Horton (philanthropist) and Michael Horton – 44 Victoria Avenue.
- Rev John Kinder MA DD MD – Minister of St Mark's Remuera.
- Bruce McLaren (1937–1970) – Race car driver. He was born in the suburb and his family lived above their garage and service station on 586–592 Remuera Road until they moved around the corner to 8 Upland Road when he was 9.
- Sir Edwin Mitchelson (1845–1934) Mitchelson was an MP, Chairman of the Remuera Road Board and Auckland's Mayor at the same time. He was Mayor from 1903 to 1905 and was knighted in 1920.
- Joseph Newman – Lived at 4 St Vincent Avenue in a house he built in 1848, now called Cotter House. Newman was a Stockbroker. A well-known teetotaller, Newman died at the age of 77 from injuries sustained when a billboard on Queen Street advertising whisky fell on his head (10 September 1890).
- James Pascoe – Jeweller
- Sir John Reed, Supreme Court Judge – 239 Remuera Rd.
- Hon. Joseph Tole, Minister of Justice from 1884 to 1887 – 251 Remuera Rd.
- William Chisholm Wilson – founder of The New Zealand Herald newspaper.
- Desley Simpson – local council politician.
- Christopher Luxon – Leader of the National Party, Prime Minister of New Zealand (since 2023)
