= 2022 Auckland local board elections =

Election in New Zealand

149 members were elected to local boards in the 2022 Auckland local board elections, an election held as part of the 2022 New Zealand local elections. Progress results were released on the 8 October. Preliminary results released on 9 October. Official and final results were released on 15 October.

== Local board elections ==

Party	Local Board members	Boards Controlled
Local Parties	67	7
Labour	26	5
C&R	26	3
Independent	24	2
City Vision	7	0

While many candidates were independents or stood for local parties, some stood for the centre-right Communities and Residents (C&R), the centre-left City Vision or the Labour Party. According to preliminary results, C&R had a successful election, gaining control of the Waitematā local board from City Vision and also picking up control of Puketāpapa. Meanwhile Labour gained control of the Henderson-Massey local board. The hotly contested Albert-Eden local board remained deadlocked 4-4 between C&R and City Vision.

=== Waitematā ===
7 candidates were elected as members of the Waitematā Local Board:

Affiliation (if any)	Name	Votes	Notes
City Vision	Alexandra Bonham	9,152	
Communities and Residents	Sarah Trotman	8,975	
City Vision	Anahera Rawiri	8,691	
City Vision	Richard Northey	8,656	
Communities and Residents	Genevieve Sage	8,359	
Communities and Residents	Allan Matson	8,305	
Communities and Residents	Greg Moyle	8,130	
Communities and Residents	Len Ward	7,927	
City Vision	Stephen May	7,917	
City Vision	Rosemary Peppermint	7,797	
City Vision	Glenda Fryer	7,745	
City Vision	Antony Phillips	7,560	
Communities and Residents	Chris Severne	6,492	
Rock the Vote NZ	Grant William Mountjoy	2,634	
Rock the Vote NZ	Mike Burton	2,240	
Rock the Vote NZ	Shayne La Rosa	2,142	
Independent	Gael Baldock	2,037	
Rock the Vote NZ	Pete Marshall	1,978	
–	Andi Liu	1,907	
Independent	Michael Kanara	1,145	
	Informal/blank	2,267	

=== Whau ===
7 candidates were elected as members of the Whau Local Board:

Affiliation (if any)	Name	Votes	Notes
Labour	Catherine Farmer	6,913	
Labour	Fasitua Amosa	6,593	
Independent	Warren Piper	6,118	
Labour	Sarah Paterson-Hamlin	6,086	
Labour	Kay Thomas	5,571	
Labour	Susan Zhu	5,349	
Independent	Ross Clow	5,302	
Labour	Valeria Gascoigne	5,247	
Greens	Jessica Rose	5,020	
Labour	Aadil Basha	4,954	
Independent	Sara Watson	4,842	
Communities and Residents	Howie Yin	4,209	
Communities and Residents	Sandy Taylor	3,966	
Communities and Residents	Anne Degia-Pala	3,832	
Communities and Residents	Ravi Nyayapati	3,720	
Community Independents	Alister Hood	3,537	
Community Independents	Kathryn Mary Davie	3,279	
Community Independents	Paul Clifford Davie	3,234	
Independent	Daphne Bisset	2,838	
–	Ellie Ikinofo	2,694	
Independent	Steven Yu	2,679	
Independent	Bruce Xu	2,258	
Independent	Nik Koulianos	1,698	
	Informal/blank	1,126	

=== Rodney ===
8 candidates were elected as members of the Rodney Local Board; 4 from the Kumeū subdivision, 3 from the Warkworth subdivision, and 1 each from the Wellsford and Dairy Flat subdivisions:

Wellsford subdivision
Affiliation (if any)	Name	Votes	%	Notes
Independent	Colin Gregory Smith	1,303	65.28%	
Independent	Libby Clews	640	32.06%	
	Informal/blank	53	2.66%	
	Total	1996		

Warkworth subdivision
Affiliation (if any)	Name	Votes	%	Notes
Independent	Tim Holdgate	4,696	22.07%	
Rodney First	Ivan Wagstaff	3,346	15.72%	
Independent	Michelle Lisa Carmichael	3,143	14.77%	
Independent	Steven Garner	2,796	13.14%	
Independent	Malcolm Ross Black	2,774	13.04%	
Independent	Anne Perratt	2,000	9.40%	
–	Kathie Hills	1,374	6.46%	
–	Greg Wyatt	808	3.80%	
	Informal/blank	344	1.62%	
	Total	21,281		

Kumeū subdivision
Affiliation (if any)	Name	Votes	%	Notes
–	Geoff Upson	5,340	16.40%	
Rodney First	Guy Wishart	3,978	12.22%	
Rodney First	Brent Bailey	3,708	11.39%	
Rodney First	Mark Dennis	3,467	10.65%	
Rodney First	Danielle Hancock	3,194	9.81%	
Rodney Action	Warren William Flaunty	3,105	9.54%	
–	Claire Buckley	2,344	7.20%	
Independent	Mike Shaw	1,944	5.97%	
–	Paul Robinson	1,882	5.78%	
–	Angus John Stott	1,709	5.25%	
WestWards	Chris Newman	1,500	4.61%	
	Informal/blank	384	1.18%	
	Total	32,555		

Dairy Flat subdivision
Affiliation (if any)	Name	Votes	Notes
Rodney First	Louise Johnston	–	This candidate was elected unopposed.

=== Hibiscus and Bays ===
8 candidates were elected as members of the Hibiscus and Bays Local Board; 4 each from the Hibiscus Coast and East Coast Bays subdivisions:

Hibiscus Coast subdivision
Affiliation (if any)	Name	Votes	%	Notes
Coast People	Gary Brown	10,405	16.77	
Coast People	Leanne Willis	7,925	12.77	
Coast People	Sam Mills	6,016	9.69	
Team Coast	Jake Law	5,618	9.05	
Independent	Nicholas Mitchell	5,426	8.74	
Coast People	Andy Dunn	5,041	8.12	
Team Coast	Lia Shelford-Toopi	4,334	6.98	
Independent	Donna Patterson	3,135	5.05	
Communities First	John Davies	2,619	4.22	
Independent	Nancy Alison Stride	2,543	4.1	
Team Coast	Trish Nathan	2,063	3.32	
Team Coast	Kereama Nathan	1,707	2.75	
Independent	Wayne McCormick	1,446	2.33	
Independent	Sion Stavrovski	1,079	1.74	
Independent	Ed Amon	769	1.24	
	Informal/blank	1,928	3.11	
	Total	62,054		

East Coast Bays subdivision
Affiliation (if any)	Name	Votes	%	Notes
Backing the Bays	Alexis Poppelbaum	9,195	19.67	
Backing the Bays	Julia Grace Parfitt	8,567	18.33	
Independent Locals	Victoria Short	6,635	14.2	
Backing the Bays	Gregg Walden	5,794	12.4	
Backing the Bays	Frank Sun	5,485	11.74	
Independent	Paul Magill	2,485	5.32	
Independent Locals	Stephen Piner	2,461	5.27	
Independent Locals	Nathan Pont	2,142	4.58	
Independent	Toby Malcolm	2,023	4.33	
Independent	Greg Wyatt	766	1.64	
	Informal/blank	1,186	2.54	
	Total	46,739		

=== Upper Harbour ===
6 candidates were elected as members of the Upper Harbour Local Board:

Affiliation (if any)	Name	Votes	Notes
Living Upper Harbour	Anna Atkinson	6,744	
Independent	Uzra Casuri Balouch	6,492	
Living Upper Harbour	Kyle Parker	5,915	
Independent	John McLean	5,677	
Living Upper Harbour	Sylvia Yang	5,677	
Independent	Callum Blair	5,349	
Living Upper Harbour	Nicholas Mayne	5,140	
Independent	Christine Glover	4,748	
–	Lyn Lydia	4,667	
Independent	John Loau	3,993	
–	Robert Hong Hu	3,715	
–	Anna Anderson	3,473	
Independent	Cherie Carbines	1,628	
Independent	Amar Trivedi	1,596	
–	David Cooke	1,497	
Independent	Alezix Heneti	1,309	
	Informal/blank	1,877	

=== Devonport-Takapuna ===
6 candidates were elected as members of the Devonport-Takapuna Local Board:

Affiliation (if any)	Name	Votes	Notes
C&R North Shore	George Wood	7,564	
A Fresh Approach	Toni Van Tonder	7,443	
A Fresh Approach	Terence Harpur	6,660	
A Fresh Approach	Melissa Powell	6,239	
A Fresh Approach	Peter Allan	6,072	
C&R North Shore	Gavin Busch	6,058	
C&R North Shore	Mike Single	5,665	
Heart of the Shore	Trish Deans	5,488	
A Fresh Approach	Zane Catterall	5,202	
Heart of the Shore	Jan O'Connor	4,948	
Heart of the Shore	John Maidment	4,894	
Heart of the Shore	Ruth Jackson	4,535	
Heart of the Shore	Bridget Thrussel	3,252	
SOS - Save Our Shore	Kevin Brett	3,150	
Independent	Tony Bunting	2,964	
SOS - Save Our Shore	Kurt Keiller	1,588	
SOS - Save Our Shore	Sam Welsh	1,291	
Independent	Michele McGregor	1,285	
SOS - Save Our Shore	Cherie Keiller	1,250	
Independent	Kent Tregonning	937	
	Informal/blank	1,523	

=== Henderson-Massey ===
8 candidates were elected as members of the Henderson-Massey Local Board:

Affiliation (if any)	Name	Votes	Notes
Labour	Chris Carter	10,699	
Labour	Oscar Kightley	10,023	
Independent	Brenda Brady	9,552	
Independent	Ingrid Papau	9,358	
Independent	Peter Chan	9,017	
Labour	Will Flavell	8,985	
Labour	Brooke Loader	8,737	
Labour	Dan Collins	7,813	
Independent	Joseph Erceg	7,426	
Labour	Susan Diao	6,726	
Independent	Sunil Kaushal	6,590	
BetterRoadSideParking	John Riddell	6,548	
Independent	Michael Coote	5,842	
Labour	Sanjay Datt Sharma	5,834	
–	Bob Jessopp	5,325	
Independent	Jacqui Harema	5,305	
Labour	Gurdeep Talwar	5,199	
Independent	Tua Schuster	4,735	
Independent	Geoff Webster	4,348	
Greens	Chimene Del La Varis	4,038	
	Informal/blank	1,305	

=== Waitākere Ranges ===
6 candidates were elected as members of the Waitākere Ranges Local Board:

Affiliation (if any)	Name	Votes	Notes
WestWards	Ken Turner	8,395	As Ken Turner has been elected a councillor to the Waitākere Ward, his name has been withdrawn and the next highest polling candidate, Mark Allen is elected to the local board.
Future West	Sandra Coney	6,528	
WestWards	Michelle Clayton	6,140	
Future West	Liz Manley	5,990	
Future West	Greg Presland	5,808	
WestWards	Linda Potauaine	5,277	
Future West	Mark Allen	5,216	
Westwards	Angus Cathcart	5,205	
Westwards	Rob Gore	4,934	
Future West	Jessamine Fraser	4,837	
Future West	Mark Roberts	4,242	
WestWards	Allan Geddes	3,725	
Independent	Noel Watson	3,229	
Independent	Alan McArdle	1,746	
Independent	Wendy Fowler	1,452	
	Informal/blank	984	

=== Albert-Eden ===
8 candidates were elected as members of the Albert-Eden Local Board; 4 each from the Maungawhau and Owairaka subdivisions:

Maungawhau subdivision
Affiliation (if any)	Name	Votes	Notes
Communities and Residents	Kendyl Smith	7,484	
Communities and Residents	Jack Tan	6,916	
Communities and Residents	José Fowler	6,372	
Communities and Residents	Rex Smith	6,105	
City Vision	Benji Fraser	4,827	
City Vision	Chrystal Thompson	4,696	
City Vision	Luke Johnson	4,565	
City Vision	Suveen Sanis Walgampola	4,361	
Rock the Vote NZ	Shayne La Rosa	1,281	
	Informal/blank	1,097	

Owairaka subdivision
Affiliation (if any)	Name	Votes	Notes
City Vision	Margi Watson	7,094	
City Vision	Julia Maskill	6,403	
City Vision	Christina Robertson	6,125	
City Vision	Liv Roe	5,789	
Communities and Residents	Will McKenzie	5,503	
Communities and Residents	Olivia Witney	5,032	
Communities & Residents	Jake Curran	4,219	
Communities & Residents	Thomas Sayers	3,983	
Independent	Tesi Naufahu	1,111	
	Informal/blank	984	

=== Aotea/Great Barrier ===
5 candidates were elected as members of the Aotea/Great Barrier Local Board:

Affiliation (if any)	Name	Votes	Notes
Independent	Izzy Fordham	450	
Independent	Neil Sanderson	377	
Independent	Patrick O'Shea	376	
Independent	Chris Ollivier	311	
–	Valmaine Toki	281	
–	Bella Sharp	193	
–	Val Foreman	168	
	Informal/blank	6	

=== Waiheke ===
5 candidates were elected as members of the Waiheke Local Board:

Affiliation (if any)	Name	Votes	Notes
Independent	Cath Handley	2,260	
–	Kylee Matthews	1,932	
Independent	Robin Tucker	1,637	
Independent	Bianca Ranson	1,590	
Independent	Paul Walden	1,540	
Independent	Norm Robins	1,520	
Greens	Kathy Voyles	1,461	
Independent	Jim Hannan	1,125	
–	Blair Anderson	916	
Independent	Russ Chambers	594	
–	Olivier Georges Roger Lequeux	317	
–	Greg Wyatt	36	
	Informal/blank	41	

=== Puketāpapa ===
6 candidates were elected as members of the Puketāpapa Local Board:

Affiliation (if any)	Name	Votes	Notes
Communities and Residents	Ella Kumar	6,682	
Communities and Residents	Roseanne Hay	6,670	
Communities and Residents	Fiona Lai	6,236	
Roskill Community Voice	Jon Turner	5,421	
Roskill Community Voice	Bobby Shen	5,317	
Communities and Residents	Mark Pervan	4,882	
Communities and Residents	Tili Leilua	4,873	
Roskill Community Voice	Pamela Mills	4,801	
Communities and Residents	Neil Punja	4,323	
Roskill Community Voice	Anoushka Maharaj	3,792	
Roskill Community Voice	Abdul Mohamud	3,585	
Roskill Community Voice	Rachael Mario	3,576	
–	John Leach	2,079	
Independent	Mohamed Soliman	1,045	
	Informal/blank	1,413	

=== Ōrākei ===
7 candidates were elected as members of the Ōrākei Local Board:

Affiliation (if any)	Name	Votes	Notes
Communities and Residents	Troy Churton	18,961	
Communities and Residents	David Wong	18,488	
Communities and Residents	Scott Milne	18,422	
Communities and Residents	Penny Tucker	18,251	
Communities and Residents	Sarah Powrie	17,501	
Communities and Residents	Margaret Voyce	16,352	
Communities and Residents	Angus McPhee	16,119	
–	Mary Nelson	9,992	
Independent	Mike Padfield	8,390	
Independent	Faith Aaron	8,049	
	Informal/blank	2,332	

=== Maungakiekie-Tāmaki ===
7 candidates were elected as members of the Maungakiekie-Tāmaki Local Board; 4 from the Tāmaki subdivision, and 3 from the Maungakiekie subdivision:

Tāmaki subdivision
Affiliation (if any)	Name	Votes	Notes
Labour	Maria Meredith	3,979	
Labour	Nerissa Henry	3,773	
Labour	Chris Makoare	3,772	
Labour	Peter McGlashan	3,522	
C&R - Communities and Residents	Tania Batucan	3,396	
C&R - Communities and Residents	Tabetha Elliott	3,134	
C&R - Communities and Residents	Michael Pepper	3,128	
C&R - Communities and Residents	Simon Hema	2,872	
–	John Alcock	2,061	
–	Sameerah Al-Saadi	624	
	Informal/blank	554	

Maungakiekie subdivision
Affiliation (if any)	Name	Votes	Notes
C&R - Communities and Residents	Don Allan	4,468	
C&R - Communities and Residents	Debbie Burrows	3,781	
C&R - Communities and Residents	Tony Woodcock	3,260	
City Vision	Danika Revell	2,747	
City Vision	Dianna Fuka	2,154	
City Vision	Chhaya Rana	1,690	
–	Christopher Caroll	1,209	
Independent	Stuart Lithgow	898	
	Informal/blank	348	

=== Howick ===
9 candidates were elected as members of the Howick Local Board; 3 each from the Botany, Howick and Pakuranga subdivisions:

Botany subdivision
Affiliation (if any)	Name	Votes	Notes
Practical not Political	Mike Turinsky	5,842	
Independent	Damian Light	5,769	
#weknowbotany	Peter Young	4,935	
#weknowbotany	Judith Grant	3,601	
Independent	Ashleigh Harding	3,146	
#weknowbotany	Ajay Bal	2,778	
C&R - Communities and Residents	Dwayne Hancock	2,701	
–	Luke Collings	2,330	
–	Mark Terrill	560	
	Informal/blank	585	

Howick subdivision
Affiliation (if any)	Name	Votes	Notes
#weknowhowick	John Spiller	7,705	
#weknowhowick	Bo Burns	7,630	
#weknowhowick	Adele White	7,441	
Independent	Sharon Stewart	7,241	
Independent	Matthew Paul Sheehy	2,494	
	Informal/blank	526	

Pakuranga subdivision
Affiliation (if any)	Name	Votes	Notes
Practical not Political	Bruce Kendall	6,571	
C&R - Communities and Residents	Katrina Bungard	5,916	
C&R - Communities and Residents	David Collings	5,012	
#weknowpakuranga	Vinson Yu	2,596	
#weknowpakuranga	Nichola Painter	2,570	
Independent	Billy Davis	1,613	
Independent	Campbell Matthews	1,486	
Independent	Khalyd Baloch	1,062	
	Informal/blank	509	

=== Kaipātiki ===
8 candidates were elected as members of the Kaipātiki Local Board:

Affiliation (if any)	Name	Votes	Notes
Shore Action	John Gillon	12,090	
Shore Action	Danille Grant	11,940	
Shore Action	Paula Gillon	10,499	
Shore Action	Melanie Kenrick	9,067	
Shore Action	Adrian Tyler	8,368	
Shore Action	Janet Tupou	7,029	
Shore Action	Erica Hannam	6,011	
Shore Action	Tim Spring	5,923	
–	Raymond Tan	5,878	
Living Kaipātiki	Andrew Shaw	5,800	
Labour	Dave Kaio	5,487	
Labour	Matthew Campbell	5,140	
Labour	Liz Hurley	5,135	
Labour	Lleuarne Panoho	4,974	
Labour	Sesalina Setu	4,923	
Independent	Ngozi Penson	4,654	
Living Kaipātiki	Ryan Nicholls	3,624	
–	Joe Zhou	3,264	
Independent	Daniel Bercich	3,195	
–	Emma Ryburn-Phengsavath	2,819	
Independent	Tim Marshall	2,139	
–	Murrey Dearlove	1,440	
–	Mark Lowrie	527	
	Informal/blank	1,611	

=== Māngere-Ōtāhuhu ===
7 candidates were elected as members of the Māngere-Ōtāhuhu Local Board:

Affiliation (if any)	Name	Votes	Notes
Labour	Harry Fatu Toleafoa	7,839	
Labour	Tauanu'u Nick Bakulich	7,345	
Labour	Joe Glassie-Rasmussen	7,133	
Labour	Christine Frances O'Brien	7,128	
Labour	Makalita Kolo	6,760	
Labour	Papaliitele Lafulafu Peo	6,705	
Labour	Togiatolu Walter Togiamua	6,689	
C&R - Communities and Residents	Malcolm Turner	5,373	
–	Michelle Hohepa	4,206	
NZ Outdoors & Freedom Party	Hine Afeaki	4,086	
Independent	Moana Margaret Herewini	3,795	
Independent	Mii Teariki	3,151	
Independent	Raneeta Lavasii-Failua	2,710	
	Informal/blank	355	

=== Ōtara-Papatoetoe ===
7 candidates were elected as members of the Ōtara-Papatoetoe Local Board; 4 from the Papatoetoe subdivision, and 3 from the Ōtara subdivision:

Papatoetoe subdivision
Affiliation (if any)	Name	Votes	Notes
Labour	Ofa Dewes	3,267	
INDEPENDENTLY PAPATOETOE	Albert Lim	3,142	
Labour	Vi Hausia	3,117	
Labour	Ashraf Choudhary	3,079	
Labour	Dawn Trenberth	2,976	
INDEPENDENTLY PAPATOETOE	Anne Nicholas	2,212	
INDEPENDENTLY PAPATOETOE	Peter Dons	2,112	
INDEPENDENTLY PAPATOETOE	Karnail Singh	1,990	
ALL 444 YOUTH	Zara Faith Marsters	1,671	
–	Harold Deo	1,250	
Animal Justice Auckland	Michael Charles Morris	955	
	Informal/blank	172	

Ōtara subdivision
Affiliation (if any)	Name	Votes	Notes
Labour	Apulu Reece Autagavaia	3,662	
Labour	Swanie Nelson	3,106	
–	Topou Folau	2,152	
Ōtara First	Albert Marley Jackson	2,061	
ALL 444 YOUTH	Raymond Tuifia	1,813	
	Informal/blank	161	

=== Franklin ===
9 candidates were elected as members of the Franklin Local Board; 2 from the Waiuku subdivision, 4 from the Pukekohe subdivision, and 3 from the Wairoa subdivision:

Waiuku subdivision
Affiliation (if any)	Name	Votes	Notes
Team Franklin	Sharlene Druyven	3,251	
Working for Waiuku	Gary Holmes	1,707	
Independent	Gareth Manning	1,290	
Team Franklin	Jasmine Woolrich	949	
Labour	Jill Ovens	371	
Independent	Vijayendra Sudhamalla	354	
Labour	Tony Nelson	339	
Independent	Bo Brenner	328	
	Informal/blank	82	

Pukekohe subdivision
Affiliation (if any)	Name	Votes	Notes
Team Franklin	Alan Cole	6,696	
Team Franklin	Logan Soole	5,438	
Team Franklin	Andrew Kay	4,561	
Team Franklin	Amanda Kinzett	3,740	
Independent	Lisa Buckingham	3,476	
Independent	Ian Cummings	3,384	
Independent	Bruce Whitehead	2,584	
Independent	Stuart Geoffrey Owers	2,077	
Independent	Nick Corlett	1,631	
Labour	Charlie Tuhua	1,327	
Labour	Prasan Tirunagari	959	
	Informal/blank	369	

Wairoa subdivision
Affiliation (if any)	Name	Votes	notes
Team Franklin	Malcolm Bell	–	This candidate was elected unopposed.
Team Franklin	Angela Fulljames	–	This candidate was elected unopposed.
Team Franklin	Amanda Hopkins	–	This candidate was elected unopposed.

=== Manurewa ===
8 candidates were elected as members of the Manurewa Local Board:

Affiliation (if any)	Name	Votes	Notes
Manurewa Action Team	Rangi Mclean	5,329	
#LoveManurewa	Joseph Allan	5,294	
Manurewa Action Team	Matt Winiata	4,853	
Manurewa Action Team	Glenn Murphy	4,775	
#LoveManurewa	Andrew Lesa	4,682	
#LoveManurewa	Angela Cunningham-Marino	4,675	
Manurewa Action Team	Anne Candy	4,656	
Manurewa Action Team	Heather Andrew	4,397	
Labour	Sago Feagaiga	4,377	
Manurewa Action Team	Renee Maxwell	4,186	
Labour	Gadiel Asiata	4,100	
Labour	Jonaan McLeod	3,766	
#LoveManurewa	Melissa Moore	3,751	
Labour	Raniera Pene	3,684	
Manurewa Action Team	Tarsh Kemp	3,666	
Labour	Kirimangu Tautogia	3,464	
#LoveManurewa	Marshal Ahluwalia	3,430	
Manurewa Action Team	Hilda Peters	3,425	
#LoveManurewa	Ally Billaney	3,390	
Labour	Kharag Singh	3,376	
Labour	Namulau'ulu Anne Singh	2,967	
Labour	Ilango Krishnamoorthy	2,733	
Keep Manurewa Beautiful	Stephen Holden	2,531	
#LoveManurewa	Luella Linaker	2,385	
#LoveManurewa	Bonita Misilisi	2,337	
Independent	David Tennent	2,327	
Independent	Ezekiel Robson	1,687	
Independent	Harry Pupuke	1,005	
Independent	Ani Armstrong	919	
	Informal/blank	871	

=== Papakura ===
8 candidates were elected as members of the Papakura Local Board:

Affiliation (if any)	Name	Votes	Notes
Papakura Action Team	Brent Catchpole	6,629	
Papakura Action Team	Jan Robinson	5,987	
Papakura Action Team	Andrew Webster	5,857	
Papakura Action Team	George Hawkins	5,750	
Papakura Action Team	Felicity Jane Auva'a	5,538	
Papakura Action Team	Kelvin Hieatt	5,340	
Independent	Kritika Selach	3,427	
Labour	Pania Wilson	2,753	
–	Hine Lillian Joyce-Tahere	2,504	
Independent	Mel Browne	2,354	
–	Karin Kerr	2,320	
–	Alex Moulton	1,971	
Independent	Warren Newcombe	1,940	
	Informal/blank	450	

== See also ==
- 2022 New Zealand local elections
- 2022 Auckland local elections
