= Ellerslie, New Zealand =

Ellerslie
- Suburb
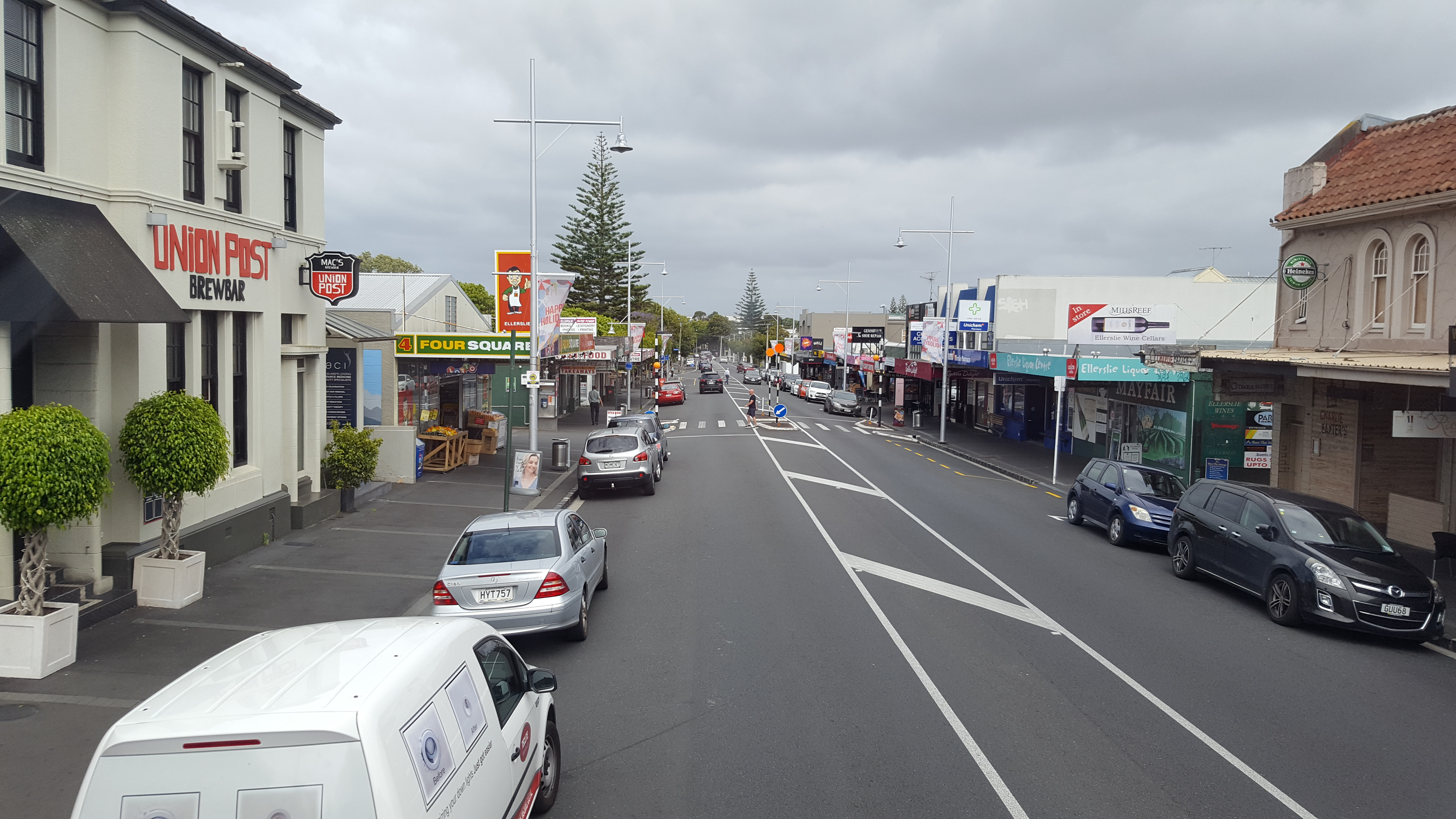
- Ellerslie town centre
- Interactive map of Ellerslie
- Coordinates: 36.897581°S 174.808493°E
- Country: New Zealand
- City: Auckland
- Local authority: Auckland Council
- Electoral ward: Maungakiekie-Tāmaki ward; Ōrākei ward
- Local board: Ōrākei Local Board; Maungakiekie-Tāmaki Local Board
- Established: 1908

Area
  - Land: 348 ha (860 acres)

Population (June 2025)
  - Total: 9,530
  - Density: 2,740/km^{2} (7,090/sq mi)
- Train stations: Ellerslie railway station

Remuera	Meadowbank, Orakei,	St Johns, Kohimarama
Greenlane, One Tree Hill	Ellerslie	Mount Wellington
Oranga	Penrose	Sylvia Park, Southdown

Ellerslie is a suburb of the city of Auckland, in the North Island of New Zealand. Ellerslie lies seven kilometres to the southeast of the city centre, close to State Highway 1.

Ellerslie is part of the Ōrākei Local Board. To the west, Ellerslie borders on the One Tree Hill area and Cornwall Park. Largely a residential suburb, the area is best-known as the site of Ellerslie Racecourse and the Ellerslie Flower Show.

== History ==
=== The Development of Ellerslie ===
The suburb was named by early local politician and entrepreneur Robert Graham, after his father's home in Elderslie (sic) in Renfrewshire, Scotland. Graham arrived in Auckland in October 1842 as an assisted immigrant from Scotland.

In 1848 Graham bought two blocks of land where, after his marriage to Sophia Swann in 1852, he built the ‘Ellerslie House’ as a family homestead. Adjacent to this home was a track along which Mrs Graham was in the habit of riding her horse every morning, now a street called Ladies Mile. Many of the local streets bear names of Graham family members.

In 1873 the railway from Auckland was extended to reach Ellerslie. It is likely that Graham developed part of his property as the 'Ellerslie Zoological Gardens' because of this development. The gardens included flower beds, fountains, a bandstand, dance pavilion and a zoo. This made Ellerslie a popular leisure centre for Aucklanders. In 1886 much of the Graham farm was subdivided for housing. Horse races were already being held in Ellerslie since 1857, but in 1886 the Racing Club acquired a permanent site from the Graham family, including the Zoological Gardens. The racecourse had its own railway station for race days, and was a prominent feature of the Ellerslie area up until its heyday in the 1920s and 1930s.

Next to Ellerslie Train Station a small township developed, servicing not only the local residents but also the race day crowds. As the 20th century progressed the surrounding rural land disappeared and Ellerslie became absorbed into suburban Auckland. The building of the Southern Motorway was to both strengthen the strategic location already created by the railway, as well as weaken the local cohesion of the area because of the physical divide the motorway created.

The original local authority was Ellerslie Town District, established in 1908. The Borough of Ellerslie was formally declared on 1 April 1938. In 1989 Ellerslie was amalgamated into Auckland City Council. The area has seen strong population growth in the recent past, growing 32% in the inner Ellerslie area between 1991 and 2001.

=== Singing Caves ===
Māori gave the name ‘Waiatarua’ to the site which later became the Ellerslie Racecourse. Translated as "two songs" the name refers to a waiata or song that emanated from caves. It was believed that this ‘singing’ was created by water and air blowing from a larger cave into a smaller passage, making a vibrating sound. In the 1960s a new grand stand was constructed at the racecourse and the caves were filled with concrete to create a seal. This was not wholly successful, and it is said that the singing could still be heard coming from the caves.

=== The Town Centre ===
The Ellerslie Town Centre is on Main Highway near where it intersects with the Ellerslie-Panmure Highway. The construction in the 1960s of the Southern Motorway cut Ellerslie off nearby Greenlane, resulting in a downturn in trade and many empty shops. However, in the 2000s, Ellerslie recovered with a strong upturn in employment in the nearby business parks on the southern side of the motorway (connected to the area with a pedestrian overbridge). The overbridge was the location of the opening scene of the New Zealand film Once Were Warriors (film). In 2006, the overbridge was transformed with a ‘Bridge of Memories’ mosaic storyboard portraying different landmark buildings, houses (past and present), and images from the local schools. Thanks to the long-term strategy of the local business association, it is now increasingly oriented towards lunchtime shoppers and again has many prosperous smaller businesses.

=== The Ellerslie Meteorite ===
At 9.00 am on 12 June 2004 a meteorite crashed through the roof of the home of the Archer family in Ellerslie. The meteorite landed into the living room of the house, bouncing off the couch and hitting the ceiling. The home owners heard an explosion and saw dust everywhere, but nobody was hurt. This meteorite is officially named the Auckland Meteorite, despite tradition demanding that a meteorite is named after the nearest post office. However, an Ellerslie Meteorite had already fallen in Australia. The rock weighs 1.3 kg and is estimated to be around 4,600 million years old. It is the ninth meteorite found in New Zealand and the first to hit a home. According to Auckland University experts, a meteorite that crashes through a roof is a very rare event. This meteorite received world-wide attention and an American collector offered the Archer family $50,000 for the space rock. The Archers declined this offer, favouring the public display of the rock in New Zealand, so that anyone interested could view it. The meteorite has been since on display in the Auckland Museum, where it can be seen in the Origins Gallery.

=== The Ellerslie Flower Show ===
The Ellerslie International Flower Show was first held in Ellerslie in 1994 at the Ellerslie Racecourse. This is New Zealand’s annual garden show. After 3 years in Ellerslie, it moved to the Auckland Botanic Gardens in Manurewa, Auckland. In 2008 the Flower Show moved again, this time to Hagley Park in Christchurch.

== Demographics ==
Ellerslie comprises four statistical areas. Ellerslie Central, East and South are primarily residential. Ellerslie West, which is separated from the rest of the suburb by the Auckland Southern Motorway, is commercial/industrial.

Individual statistical areas
Name	Area (km^{2})	Population	Density (per km^{2})	Dwellings	Median age	Median income
Ellerslie Central	1.55	3,153	2,034	1,185	36.6 years	$56,300
Ellerslie East	0.75	3,108	4,144	1,152	36.0 years	$60,500
Ellerslie South	0.83	2,427	2,924	909	35.3 years	$62,000
Ellerslie West	0.83	114	326	75	36.1 years	$59,700
New Zealand					38.1 years	$41,500

=== Residential area ===
The residential area of Ellerslie covers 3.13 km^{2} (1.21 sq mi) and had an estimated population of 9,250 as of June 2025, with a population density of 2,955 people per km^{2}.

Historical population of the residential area
Year	Pop.	±% p.a.
2006	7,938	—
2013	8,622	+1.19%
2018	9,072	+1.02%
2023	8,688	−0.86%
The 2006 population is for a smaller area of 3.07 km^{2}. Source:

Ellerslie's residential area had a population of 8,688 in the 2023 New Zealand census, a decrease of 384 people (−4.2%) since the 2018 census, and an increase of 66 people (0.8%) since the 2013 census. There were 4,203 males, 4,440 females and 48 people of other genders in 3,246 dwellings. 4.7% of people identified as LGBTIQ+. There were 1,581 people (18.2%) aged under 15 years, 1,785 (20.5%) aged 15 to 29, 4,323 (49.8%) aged 30 to 64, and 1,002 (11.5%) aged 65 or older.

People could identify as more than one ethnicity. The results were 60.6% European (Pākehā); 7.3% Māori; 6.6% Pasifika; 33.0% Asian; 3.7% Middle Eastern, Latin American and African New Zealanders (MELAA); and 1.6% other, which includes people giving their ethnicity as "New Zealander". English was spoken by 94.5%, Māori language by 0.9%, Samoan by 0.9%, and other languages by 28.4%. No language could be spoken by 2.1% (e.g. too young to talk). New Zealand Sign Language was known by 0.2%. The percentage of people born overseas was 41.5, compared with 28.8% nationally.

Religious affiliations were 32.7% Christian, 4.2% Hindu, 1.9% Islam, 0.2% Māori religious beliefs, 2.6% Buddhist, 0.4% New Age, 0.4% Jewish, and 2.1% other religions. People who answered that they had no religion were 50.3%, and 5.4% of people did not answer the census question.

Of those at least 15 years old, 3,366 (47.4%) people had a bachelor's or higher degree, 2,565 (36.1%) had a post-high school certificate or diploma, and 1,173 (16.5%) people exclusively held high school qualifications. 1,584 people (22.3%) earned over $100,000 compared to 12.1% nationally. The employment status of those at least 15 was that 4,503 (63.4%) people were employed full-time, 798 (11.2%) were part-time, and 129 (1.8%) were unemployed.

=== Commercial/Industrial area ===
Ellerslie West covers 0.35 km^{2} (0.14 sq mi) and had an estimated population of 280 as of June 2025, with a population density of 1,120 people per km^{2}.

Historical population of the Commercial/Industrial area
Year	Pop.	±% p.a.
2006	99	—
2013	108	+1.25%
2018	114	+1.09%
2023	114	+0.00%
The 2006 population is for a larger area of 0.40 km^{2}. Source:

Ellerslie West had a population of 114 in the 2023 New Zealand census, unchanged since the 2018 census, and an increase of 6 people (5.6%) since the 2013 census. There were 48 males and 69 females in 75 dwellings. 7.9% of people identified as LGBTIQ+. The median age was 36.1 years (compared with 38.1 years nationally). There were 15 people (13.2%) aged under 15 years, 18 (15.8%) aged 15 to 29, 66 (57.9%) aged 30 to 64, and 12 (10.5%) aged 65 or older.

People could identify as more than one ethnicity. The results were 36.8% European (Pākehā), 13.2% Māori, 7.9% Pasifika, and 50.0% Asian. English was spoken by 94.7%, Māori language by 2.6%, and other languages by 39.5%. No language could be spoken by 2.6% (e.g. too young to talk). The percentage of people born overseas was 50.0, compared with 28.8% nationally.

Religious affiliations were 31.6% Christian, 2.6% Hindu, 13.2% Buddhist, 2.6% New Age, and 2.6% other religions. People who answered that they had no religion were 42.1%, and 10.5% of people did not answer the census question.

Of those at least 15 years old, 33 (33.3%) people had a bachelor's or higher degree, 36 (36.4%) had a post-high school certificate or diploma, and 21 (21.2%) people exclusively held high school qualifications. The median income was $59,700, compared with $41,500 nationally. 15 people (15.2%) earned over $100,000 compared to 12.1% nationally. The employment status of those at least 15 was that 60 (60.6%) people were employed full-time, 15 (15.2%) were part-time, and 3 (3.0%) were unemployed.

== Local government ==
In 1908, the Ellerslie Town District was established. The town district became Ellerslie Borough in 1938. It started in 1938 and eventually merged into Auckland City Council in 1989 and then merged into Auckland Council in November 2010.

=== Mayors during Ellerslie Borough Council ===
Ellerslie had six mayors during its 51-year existence. The following is a complete list:

	Name	Term
1	Horace James White	1938–1956
2	Lloyd Elsmore	1956–1962
3	Alan Trevor Bell	1962–1974
4	William Edgar Brewster	1974–1980
5	Bill Cann	1980–1981
6	Leon Leicester	1981–1989

== Landmarks and features ==
=== The Ellerslie Race Course ===
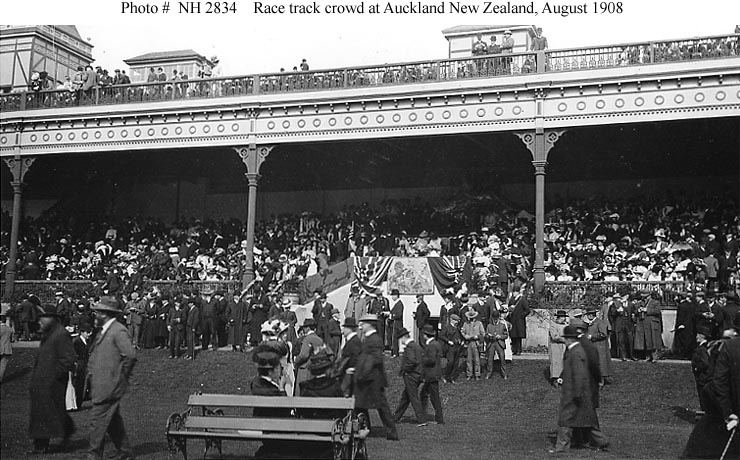
Spectators at Ellerslie Racecourse, 1908

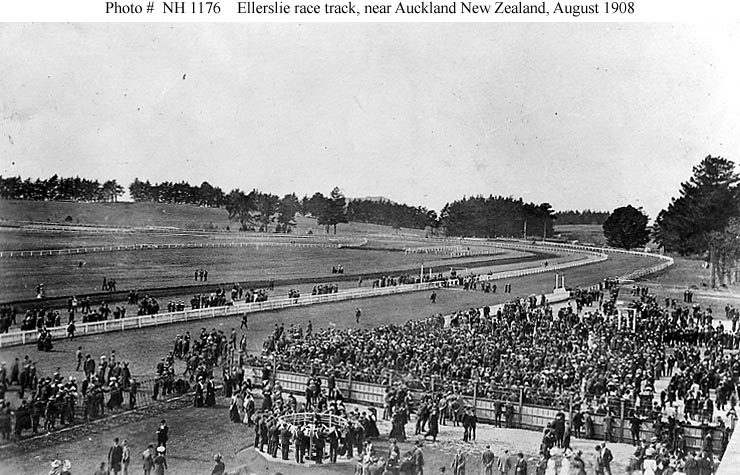
Ellerslie Racecourse, 1908

The Ellerslie area has been known as the centre for horseracing since New Zealand’s first race meeting was organised there in 1842. The property was first used as farmland by Robert Graham, who was a supporter of racing. He later developed both the Alexandra Park Racecourse and the Ellerslie Racecourse. In 1873, Graham sold both racecourses to the Auckland Racing Club. The Auckland Jockey Club bought around 36 hectares (90 acres) in 1872. Today, the club owns around 72 hectares (180 acres) and race meetings are regularly held at the race course, including the New Zealand Derby and the Auckland Cup, the main races at the summer meeting. The racecourse is also home to a golf driving range and a nine-hole pitch and putt. In recent years, associated activities like fashion shows and socialising have become as important as watching the races.

=== Notable buildings ===
- Christ Church – This wooden gothic Anglican church was opened in 1883 in Ladies Mile. Its most significant feature is a full set of stained glass windows gifted to the congregation by the English firm of Clayton and Bell.
- Former Ellerslie Post Office – The post office was designed in 1909 by John Campbell. He modelled the building on the post offices in Mount Eden and Kingsland. The post office operated here until the privatisation of New Zealand Post in the late 1980s.
- Former Southern Cross Picture Theatre – This cinema was opened in 1925 and represented an exciting change in socialising for the people of Ellerslie. In the 1970s it was converted into squash courts.
- Former Municipal Offices – The Ellerslie Town District purchased the land on the corner of Ramsgate St and Main Highway in 1926 for the construction of its municipal buildings. The Ellerslie Borough Council was based in these offices until it merged with Auckland City in 1989.
- Arborfield – This two-story wooden Italianate house on the corner of Ramsgate st. and Main Highway was the residence of Lieut. Col Charles Dawson (18th Royal Irish Regiment), Chairman of the Mount Wellington Road Board and Master of the Pakuranga Hunt.
- Ellerslie War Memorial Hall Community Centre – This building was constructed in 1989 after fundraising by local groups and is used as a centre for performing arts. The Ellerslie servicemen who were killed or wounded in World War I and World War II are recognised in the Roll of Honour in the foyer of the War Memorial Hall.
- Ellerslie supermarket

=== Parks and reserves ===
The Ellerslie Domain – The Ellerslie Domain is centrally located in Ellerslie and has sport facilities for tennis and rugby. Several sporting associations use the domain for their training, including the Ellerslie Eagles who compete in the Auckland Rugby League.

Michaels Avenue Reserve – The Michaels Avenue Reserve is a huge open green space used for sports and recreation activities. The reserve has an interesting array of plants and wildlife and a wetland is present in its north corner. The reserve has a playground for children and grounds for cricket and soccer. The Ellerslie Recreation Centre is located within the reserve, with a gymnasium which hosts various indoor sports.

Celtic Crescent Reserve – This reserve focuses on children, who can play on the adventure playground. The wider community can enjoy both passive and active recreation.

== Sport and recreation ==
Ellerslie is home to several sporting clubs, including Ellerslie AFC who compete in the Lotto Sport Italia NRFL Division 1 and the Ellerslie Eagles who compete in Auckland Rugby League competitions.

Ellerslie is also the home of Ellerslie Bowling Club Established in 1911 Home to former British Empire Games Gold Medalist Robert Lang McDonald who attended the Ellerslie Primary School in early 1940s.

== Education ==
The main primary school in the area is Ellerslie School, a primary and intermediate school (years 1–8), that was founded in 1877. It has a roll of 746.

St Mary's School is a state-integrated Catholic contributing primary school (years 1–6) with a roll of 373.

Michael Park School is a state-integrated Waldorf composite school (years 1–13) with a roll of 317.

The above schools are coeducational. Rolls are as of July 2026.

Other secondary schools serving the local population are One Tree Hill College, St Peter’s College and Baradene College of the Sacred Heart.

== Libraries ==
The residents and ratepayers of Ellerslie are entitled to free library membership at all of the library branches of Auckland City Libraries. There is no branch located in Ellerslie; the nearest are located in Remuera and Panmure. The Ellerslie Toy Library in Leicester Hall is a branch of the Toy Library Federation of New Zealand. The Ellerslie Toy Library relies on membership fees and donations to operate.

== See also ==
- Ellerslie Racecourse
- Ellerslie Flower Show
