= Meadowbank, New Zealand =

Meadowbank
- Suburb
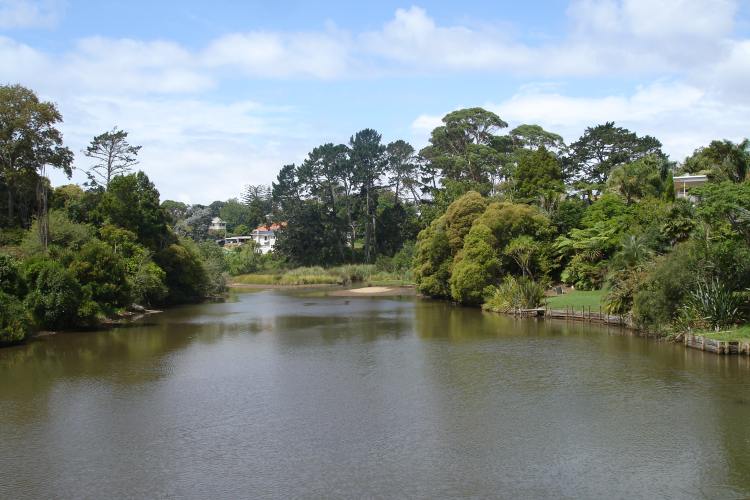
- Ōrākei Creek in Meadowbank, as seen from the Waiatarua Road overbridge
- Interactive map of Meadowbank
- Coordinates: 36.871924°S 174.826907°E
- Country: New Zealand
- City: Auckland
- Local authority: Auckland Council
- Electoral ward: Ōrākei ward
- Local board: Ōrākei Local Board

Area
  - Land: 168 ha (420 acres)

Population (June 2025)
  - Total: 5,820
  - Density: 3,460/km^{2} (8,970/sq mi)
- Postcode: 1072
- Train stations: Meadowbank Railway Station

Parnell (3.9 km)	Ōrākei (1.6 km)	Mission Bay (2.0 km)
Remuera (2.2 km)	Meadowbank	Glen Innes (3.6 km)
Greenlane (3.6 km)	Ellerslie (3.2 km)	St Johns (1.9 km)

Meadowbank is a central suburb of Auckland city, situated in the North Island of New Zealand. Meadowbank is governed under the local governance of the Ōrākei Local Board and Auckland Council. The Meadowbank train station is the second stop on the Eastern Train line. The Ōrākei Basin is held between the two suburbs of Meadowbank and Remuera. The Meadowbank Mall and nearby corner shops are located on the corner of Gerard Way and St John's Road. Purewa Cemetery, one of central Auckland's largest cemeteries, is situated in Meadowbank and can be accessed from St John's Road.

== History ==
Starting in 1939 a large state housing development was undertaken in Meadowbank.

== Demographics ==
Meadowbank covers 1.68 km^{2} (0.65 sq mi) and had an estimated population of 5,820 as of June 2025, with a population density of 3,464 people per km^{2}.

Historical population
Year	Pop.	±% p.a.
2006	4,695	—
2013	5,046	+1.04%
2018	5,328	+1.09%
2023	5,592	+0.97%
Source: source=

Meadowbank had a population of 5,592 in the 2023 New Zealand census, an increase of 264 people (5.0%) since the 2018 census, and an increase of 546 people (10.8%) since the 2013 census. There were 2,598 males, 2,970 females and 24 people of other genders in 2,109 dwellings. 3.4% of people identified as LGBTIQ+. The median age was 39.3 years (compared with 38.1 years nationally). There were 1,149 people (20.5%) aged under 15 years, 915 (16.4%) aged 15 to 29, 2,613 (46.7%) aged 30 to 64, and 912 (16.3%) aged 65 or older.

People could identify as more than one ethnicity. The results were 73.7% European (Pākehā); 7.5% Māori; 4.3% Pasifika; 19.6% Asian; 4.3% Middle Eastern, Latin American and African New Zealanders (MELAA); and 2.0% other, which includes people giving their ethnicity as "New Zealander". English was spoken by 95.5%, Māori language by 1.5%, Samoan by 0.7%, and other languages by 24.2%. No language could be spoken by 2.0% (e.g. too young to talk). New Zealand Sign Language was known by 0.2%. The percentage of people born overseas was 34.7, compared with 28.8% nationally.

Religious affiliations were 38.7% Christian, 1.8% Hindu, 1.7% Islam, 0.3% Māori religious beliefs, 1.6% Buddhist, 0.3% New Age, 0.9% Jewish, and 1.0% other religions. People who answered that they had no religion were 48.8%, and 5.1% of people did not answer the census question.

Of those at least 15 years old, 2,151 (48.4%) people had a bachelor's or higher degree, 1,617 (36.4%) had a post-high school certificate or diploma, and 675 (15.2%) people exclusively held high school qualifications. The median income was $57,900, compared with $41,500 nationally. 1,206 people (27.1%) earned over $100,000 compared to 12.1% nationally. The employment status of those at least 15 was that 2,436 (54.8%) people were employed full-time, 627 (14.1%) were part-time, and 96 (2.2%) were unemployed.

Individual statistical areas
Name	Area (km^{2})	Population	Density (per km^{2})	Dwellings	Median age	Median income
Meadowbank West	1.02	2,985	2,926	1,107	41.0 years	$53,700
Meadowbank East	0.65	2,607	4,011	1,002	37.5 years	$61,300
New Zealand					38.1 years	$41,500

== Education ==
St John's College and Trinity Theological College are also located on St John's Road. Local primary schools include Meadowbank School (public) and Mt Carmel School, Meadowbank (state-integrated Catholic). Local secondary schools comprise Selwyn College and Baradene College of the Sacred Heart. Mount Carmel School is a coeducational state-integrated Catholic primary school (years 1–6) with a roll of 202 as of July 2026.
