= Ōrākei Local Board =

Coordinates: 36°52′35.31″S 174°49′36.11″E

Ōrākei Local Board Te Poari ā-Rohe o Ōrākei
- Local board of Ōrākei
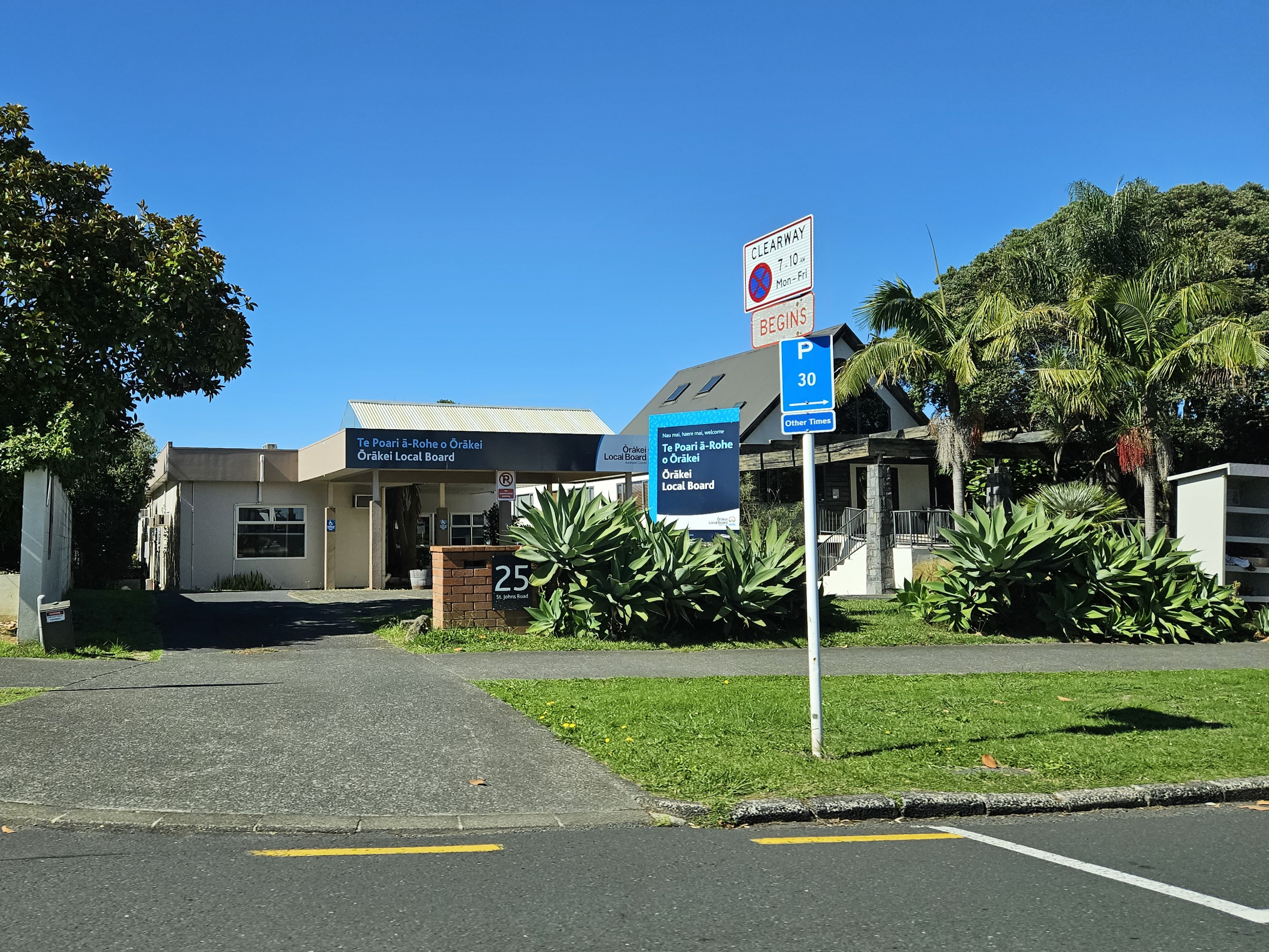
- Ōrākei Local Board office in Meadowbank

- Country: New Zealand
- Region: Auckland
- Territorial authority: Auckland Council
- Ward: Ōrākei ward
- Legislated: 2010

Area
  - Land: 32.39 km^{2} (12.51 sq mi)

Population (June 2025)
  - Total: 86,800
  - Density: 2,680/km^{2} (6,940/sq mi)

Local Board Members

Leadership
- Chairperson: Sarah Powrie, C & R
- Deputy chairperson: Scott Milne, C & R

Structure
- Seats: 7
- Political groups: Communities and Residents (6); ACT Local (1)
- Length of term: 3 years

Elections
- Last election: 2025
- Next election: 2028

Meeting place
- 25 St Johns Road, Meadowbank

The Ōrākei Local Board is one of the 21 local boards of Auckland Council. It is coterminous with the Ōrākei ward. It was chaired in its first two terms by local politician Desley Simpson following the 2010 and 2013 elections. In the 2016 elections, Simpson stood for and won the Orakei ward councillor seat on Auckland Council. Colin Davis took her place as Chair.

== Geography ==
The Ōrākei Local Board Area includes both the suburb of Ōrākei, and the nearby suburbs of Remuera, Ellerslie, Stonefields, St Johns, Meadowbank, Mission Bay, Kohimarama, St Heliers, Glendowie and Glen Innes. There are town centres in Ellerslie, St Johns, Remuera, Mission Bay and St Heliers.

Geographically, area is situated around the Ōrākei Basin and along a Hauraki Gulf coastline with beaches and cliffs.

== Demographics ==
Ōrākei Local Board Area covers 32.39 km^{2} (12.51 sq mi) and had an estimated population of 86,800 as of June 2025, with a population density of 2,680 people per km^{2}.

Historical population
Year	Pop.	±% p.a.
2006	74,520	—
2013	79,539	+0.94%
2018	84,318	+1.17%
2023	83,196	−0.27%

Ōrākei Local Board Area had a population of 83,196 in the 2023 New Zealand census, a decrease of 1,122 people (−1.3%) since the 2018 census, and an increase of 3,657 people (4.6%) since the 2013 census. There were 39,921 males, 42,996 females and 279 people of other genders in 30,573 dwellings. 3.4% of people identified as LGBTIQ+. The median age was 40.9 years (compared with 38.1 years nationally). There were 14,520 people (17.5%) aged under 15 years, 15,543 (18.7%) aged 15 to 29, 38,577 (46.4%) aged 30 to 64, and 14,553 (17.5%) aged 65 or older.

People could identify as more than one ethnicity. The results were 68.4% European (Pākehā); 6.4% Māori; 3.7% Pasifika; 26.7% Asian; 3.4% Middle Eastern, Latin American and African New Zealanders (MELAA); and 1.8% other, which includes people giving their ethnicity as "New Zealander". English was spoken by 95.4%, Māori language by 1.4%, Samoan by 0.5%, and other languages by 27.4%. No language could be spoken by 1.6% (e.g. too young to talk). New Zealand Sign Language was known by 0.3%. The percentage of people born overseas was 39.9, compared with 28.8% nationally.

Religious affiliations were 35.3% Christian, 2.4% Hindu, 1.4% Islam, 0.4% Māori religious beliefs, 2.1% Buddhist, 0.2% New Age, 0.7% Jewish, and 1.3% other religions. People who answered that they had no religion were 50.8%, and 5.6% of people did not answer the census question.

Of those at least 15 years old, 33,750 (49.1%) people had a bachelor's or higher degree, 24,357 (35.5%) had a post-high school certificate or diploma, and 10,563 (15.4%) people exclusively held high school qualifications. The median income was $58,000, compared with $41,500 nationally. 18,786 people (27.4%) earned over $100,000 compared to 12.1% nationally. The employment status of those at least 15 was that 36,624 (53.3%) people were employed full-time, 9,627 (14.0%) were part-time, and 1,443 (2.1%) were unemployed.

== 2025-2028 term ==
The current board members for the 2025-2028 term, elected at the 2025 local elections, are:

Name	Affiliation	Position
Sarah Powrie	Communities and Residents	Chairperson
Scott Milne	Communities and Residents	Deputy Chairperson
Troy Churton	Communities and Residents	Board member
David Wong	Communities and Residents	Board member
Margaret Voyce	Communities and Residents	Board member
Angus McPhee	Communities and Residents	Board member
Amanda Lockyer	ACT Local	Board member

== 2022-2025 term ==
Between September and October 2022, the 2022 Auckland local elections took place. The board members elected for the 2022–2025 term were:

- Troy Churton, C&R - Communities & Residents (18,961 votes)
- David Wong, C&R - Communities & Residents (18,488 votes)
- Scott Milne, C&R - Communities & Residents (18,422 votes)
- Penny Tucker, C&R - Communities & Residents (18,251 votes)
- Sarah Powrie, C&R - Communities & Residents (17,501 votes)
- Margaret Voyce, C&R - Communities & Residents (16,352 votes)
- Angus Mcphee, C&R - Communities & Residents (16,119 votes)
