= James Binney (cricketer) =

Australian cricketer

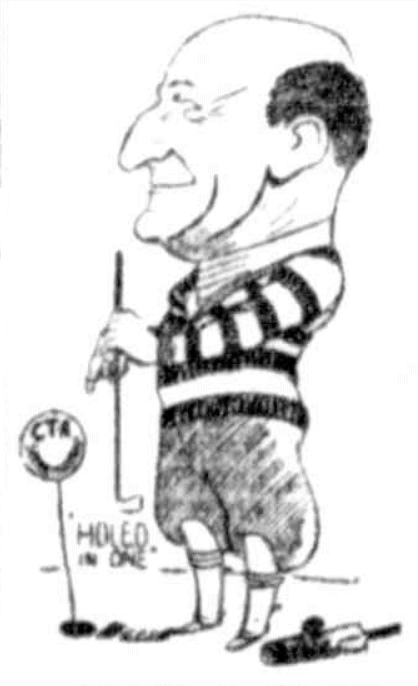
James Binney, caricature

Edgar James Binney (31 May 1885 – 9 September 1978) was an Australian cricketer. He was a left-handed batsman and right-arm medium-fast bowler who played for Victoria.

Binney was principally an opening bowler. He made a single first-class appearance for Victoria during the 1909–10 season, against Tasmania. He took no wickets for 72 from 30 six-ball overs and, batting at number eleven, he scored 29 runs in the only innings in which he batted, as Victoria won the match by an innings.

Binney married Naomi Frances Proud in Melbourne in December 1917. He worked as a commercial traveller. In 1931 was elected secretary of the Victorian branch of the Commercial Travellers' Association, and retired from the position in 1956. At the time of his death in the Melbourne suburb of Brighton in 1978, aged 93, he was Victoria's oldest living first-class player.
