= Binney, Illinois =

- Unincorporated community
- Location within Illinois Location within the United States
- Coordinates: 38°59′24″N 89°43′38″W
- Country: United States
- State: Illinois
- County: Madison
- Elevation: 607 ft (185 m)
- Time zone: UTC-6 (Central (CST))
  - Summer (DST): UTC-5 (CDT)
- Area code: 618
- GNIS feature ID: 422463

Binney is an unincorporated community in Madison County, Illinois, United States.
