= Roy Binney =

New Zealand architect and soldier (1885–1957)

Roy Keith Binney (13 April 1885 – 28 October 1957) was a New Zealand architect and soldier. He was born in Auckland, Auckland Region, New Zealand on 13 April 1885. He designed some of the most notable houses in Remuera and Parnell.
