= Binney & Burnham =

Defunct American motor vehicle manufacturer

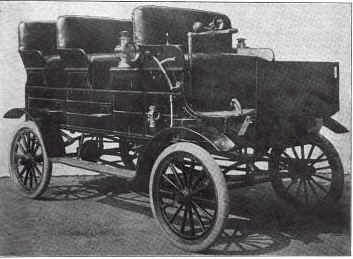
1902 Binney-Burnham Model C Touring with a body by Currier, Cameron and Company

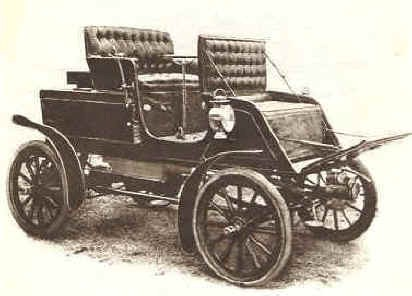
1902 Binney-Burnham Runabout with Fold-down Front Seat

The Binney & Burnham was an American automobile built in Boston, Massachusetts from 1901 to 1902 by James L. Binney and John Appleton Burnham. It was a twin-cylinder steam car.
