= Desley Simpson =

New Zealand politician

Desley Simpson JP
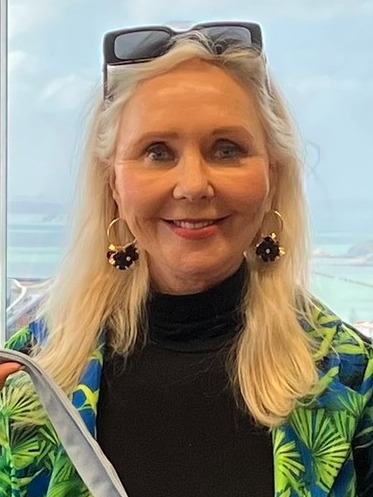
- Simpson in 2026

3rd Deputy Mayor of Auckland
- Incumbent
- Assumed office 28 October 2022
- Mayor: Wayne Brown
- Preceded by: Bill Cashmore

Ōrākei Ward Councillor
- Incumbent
- Assumed office 2016
- Preceded by: Cameron Brewer

Personal details
- Party: Communities and Residents (formerly)
- Spouse(s): Scott Simpson (divorced) Peter Goodfellow (after 2008)
- Relatives: James Donald (grandfather)
- Education: Diocesan School for Girls, Auckland

Desley Elisabeth Charlotte Simpson JP (née Lawson) is a New Zealand politician who is an Auckland councillor. In October 2022, Simpson was chosen as the deputy mayor of Auckland.

== Early life ==
Simpson grew up in the Auckland suburb of Remuera, and attended Diocesan School for Girls, Auckland, where her mother, Leonie Lawson, was head of music. She learned to play the organ at Diocesan, and is still an organist. Simpson's grandfather Sir James Donald was also a politician in Auckland and she paid tribute to him in her maiden speech and wore the fob chain presented to him when he became deputy chairman of the Auckland Harbour Board in 1935.

== Political career ==
Auckland Council
Years	Ward	Affiliation
2016–2019	Ōrākei	Communities and Residents
2019–2022	Ōrākei	Communities and Residents
2022–2024	Ōrākei	Communities and Residents
2024–2025	Ōrākei	Independent
2025–present	Ōrākei	Fix Auckland

Simpson is a member of the National Party. She chaired the Hobson Community Board in the Auckland City Council. With the merger of Auckland City Council into the Auckland Council, Simpson was elected to the Ōrākei Local Board at the 2010 elections and became the chairperson. She was re-elected in 2013.

At the 2016 Auckland elections, Simpson stood for the Ōrākei ward on the council, following an announcement by incumbent Cameron Brewer that he would not stand for re-election. Simpson stood for Communities and Residents, despite the formation of Auckland Future, a group supported by the National Party. Simpson was elected to council in a landslide, receiving over 18,000 votes. The Mayor of Auckland, Phil Goff, appointed her as the deputy chair of the finance and performance committee.

Simpson was re-elected in the 2022 Auckland elections, and was chosen by incoming mayor Wayne Brown as the deputy mayor of Auckland.

In May 2025, Communities & Residents president David Hay confirmed that Simpson had resigned from the party 18 months earlier.

In June 2025, Simpson announced that she would not run for mayor in that year's local elections, following months of speculation that she would. Simpson instead endorsed Wayne Brown's re-election campaign. In the same announcement, she said that she would run for re-election in the Ōrākei ward. She ended up being re-elected unopposed.

== Personal life ==
Simpson is married to the former National Party president, Peter Goodfellow. She was previously married to National MP, Scott Simpson, and they separated in 2004 or 2005. Since September 2008, she has lived with Goodfellow, who defeated her former husband for the party presidency in 2009.

Simpson was appointed a justice of the peace in 1998.
