= Ōrākei ward =

Coordinates: 36°52′35.31″S 174°49′36.11″E

- Ward of Auckland
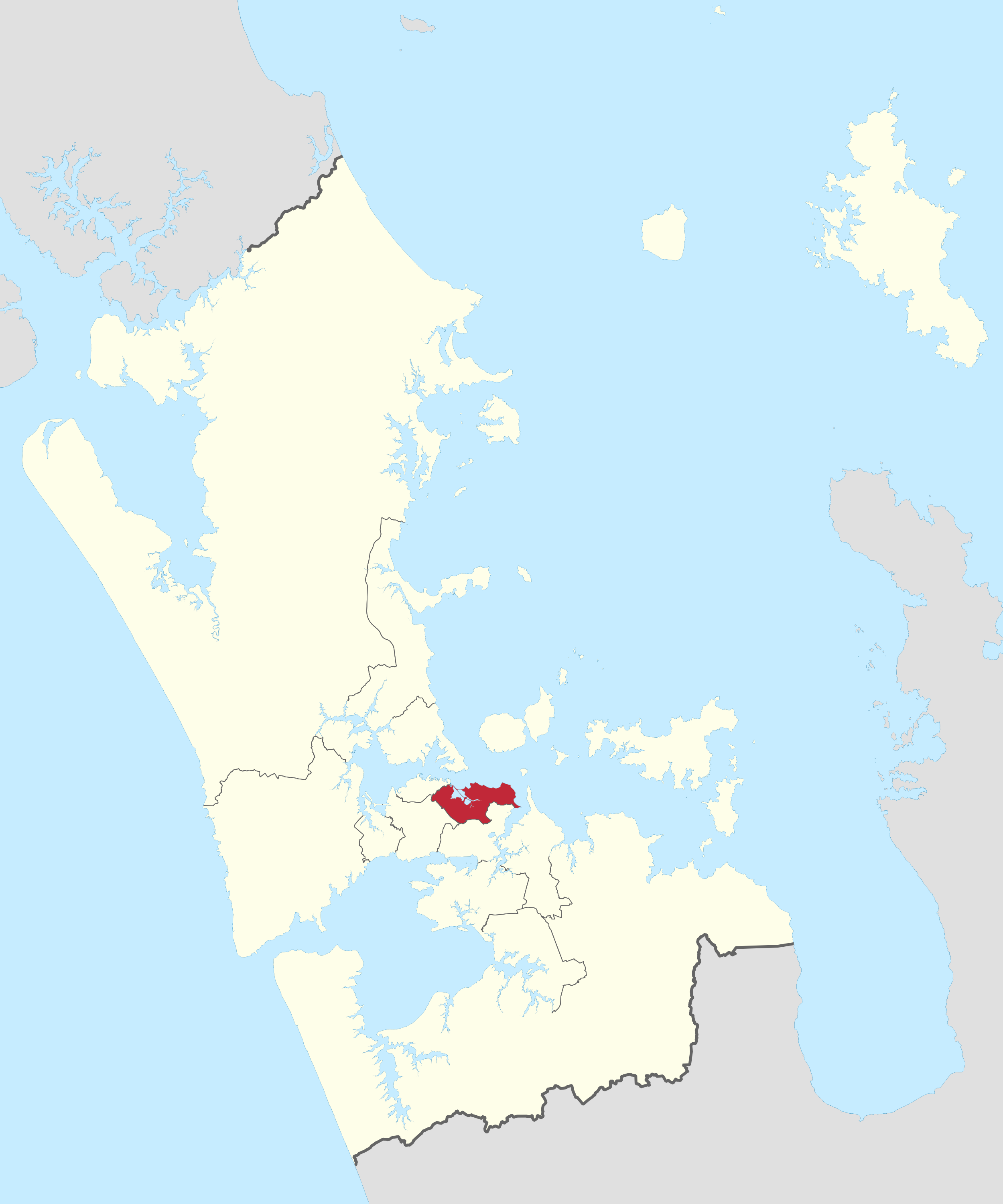
- Country: New Zealand
- Island: North Island
- Region: Auckland Region

Government
  - Councillor: Desley Simpson

Area
  - Land: 32.80 km^{2} (12.66 sq mi)

Population (June 2025)
  - Total: 90,700
  - Density: 2,770/km^{2} (7,160/sq mi)

The Ōrākei ward is one of thirteen wards of Auckland Council in Auckland, New Zealand. It encompasses the neighbourhoods of Saint Heliers, Glendowie, Kohimarama, Mission Bay, Saint Johns and Meadowbank. It elects one councillor to represent the ward on the council. The current councillor is Desley Simpson.

== Demographics ==
Ōrākei ward covers 32.80 km^{2} (12.66 sq mi) and had an estimated population of 90,700 as of June 2025, with a population density of 2,765 people per km^{2}.

Historical population
Year	Pop.	±% p.a.
2006	74,520	—
2013	81,573	+1.30%
2018	86,193	+1.11%
2023	86,151	−0.01%
The 2006 population is for a smaller area of 32.35 km^{2}. Source:

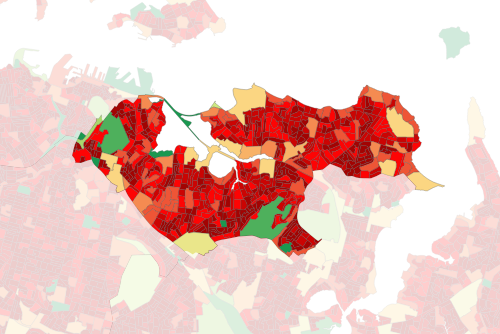
Population density in the 2023 census

Ōrākei ward had a population of 86,151 in the 2023 New Zealand census, a decrease of 42 people (−0.0%) since the 2018 census, and an increase of 4,578 people (5.6%) since the 2013 census. There were 41,085 males, 44,763 females and 300 people of other genders in 32,184 dwellings. 3.9% of people identified as LGBTIQ+. The median age was 40.8 years (compared with 38.1 years nationally). There were 13,713 people (15.9%) aged under 15 years, 17,742 (20.6%) aged 15 to 29, 39,255 (45.6%) aged 30 to 64, and 15,438 (17.9%) aged 65 or older.

People could identify as more than one ethnicity. The results were 68.4% European (Pākehā); 6.1% Māori; 3.1% Pasifika; 27.2% Asian; 3.4% Middle Eastern, Latin American and African New Zealanders (MELAA); and 1.7% other, which includes people giving their ethnicity as "New Zealander". English was spoken by 95.5%, Māori language by 1.3%, Samoan by 0.5%, and other languages by 28.4%. No language could be spoken by 1.4% (e.g. too young to talk). New Zealand Sign Language was known by 0.3%. The percentage of people born overseas was 40.8, compared with 28.8% nationally.

Religious affiliations were 34.9% Christian, 2.1% Hindu, 1.4% Islam, 0.4% Māori religious beliefs, 2.1% Buddhist, 0.2% New Age, 0.7% Jewish, and 1.2% other religions. People who answered that they had no religion were 51.6%, and 5.5% of people did not answer the census question.

Of those at least 15 years old, 36,147 (49.9%) people had a bachelor's or higher degree, 25,503 (35.2%) had a post-high school certificate or diploma, and 10,782 (14.9%) people exclusively held high school qualifications. The median income was $57,200, compared with $41,500 nationally. 19,896 people (27.5%) earned over $100,000 compared to 12.1% nationally. The employment status of those at least 15 was that 37,545 (51.8%) people were employed full-time, 10,527 (14.5%) were part-time, and 1,698 (2.3%) were unemployed.

== Councillors ==
Ōrākei Ward Councillor of Auckland
- Incumbent; Desley Simpson since 2016
- Term length: Three years
- Inaugural holder: Cameron Brewer
- Formation: 1 November 2010
- Website: www.aucklandcouncil.govt.nz

Election	Councillor elected	Affiliation	Votes	Notes
2010	Cameron Brewer	Independent	18,235	
2013	Cameron Brewer	Independent	elected unopposed	
2016	Desley Simpson	Communities and Residents	18,255	
2019	Desley Simpson	Communities and Residents	19,618	
2022	Desley Simpson	Communities and Residents	19,618	
2025	Desley Simpson	Fix Auckland	elected unopposed	

== Election results ==
Election results for the Ōrākei ward:

=== 2025 election results ===
Ōrākei ward
Affiliation	Candidate	Votes
Fix Auckland	Desley Simpson^{†}	Unopposed
Registered		68,441
Fix Auckland gain from Independent (incumbent changed affiliation)		
^{†} incumbent

=== 2022 election results ===
	Name	Affiliation	Votes
1	Desley Simpson	Communities and Residents	24634
	Aaron Faith	Independent	4724
Blank			2049
Informal			710

=== 2016 election results ===
	Name	Affiliation	Votes	%
1	Desley Simpson	Communities and Residents	18,255	63.6%
	Richard Leckinger	Green Party	4,313	14.5%
	Mike Padfield	Community Voice	3,414	11.5%
	Ian Wilson		996	3.4%
Blank			2,607	8.8%
Informal			121	0.4%
Turnout			29,706	
